= 2010 European Athletics Championships – Women's 200 metres =

Women's 200 metres at the European Athletics Championships

The women's 200 metres at the 2010 European Athletics Championships was held at the Estadi Olímpic Lluís Companys on July 30 and July 31.

== Medalists ==
Gold	Myriam Soumaré; France (FRA)
Silver	Yelizaveta Bryzhina; Ukraine (UKR)
Bronze	Aleksandra Fedoriva; Russia (RUS)

== Records ==
Standing records prior to the 2010 European Athletics Championships
World record	Florence Griffith Joyner (USA)	21.34	Seoul, South Korea	29 September 1988
European record	Marita Koch (GER)	21.71	Karl-Marx-Stadt, East Germany	10 June 1979
European record	Marita Koch (GER)	21.71	Potsdam, East Germany	21 July 1984
European record	Heike Drechsler (GER)	21.71	Jena, East Germany	29 June 1986
European record	Heike Drechsler (GER)	21.71	Stuttgart, West Germany	29 August 1986
Championship record	Heike Drechsler (GER)	21.71	Stuttgart, West Germany	29 August 1986
World Leading	Veronica Campbell-Brown (JAM)	21.98	New York City, United States	12 June 2010
European Leading	Aleksandra Fedoriva (RUS)	22.41	Saransk, Russia	15 July 2010
Broken records during the 2010 European Athletics Championships
European Leading	Myriam Soumaré (FRA)	22.32	Barcelona, Spain	31 July 2010

== Schedule ==
Date	Time	Round
July 30, 2010	12:20	Round 1
July 30, 2010	19:00	Semifinals
July 31, 2010	19:50	Final

== Results ==
=== Round 1 ===
==== Heat 1 ====
Rank	Lane	Name	Nationality	React	Time	Notes
1	4	Yelizaveta Bryzhina	Ukraine	0.245	23.10	Q
2	6	Myriam Soumaré	France	0.179	23.22	Q
3	3	Ksenija Balta	Estonia	0.205	23.75	Q
4	5	Niamh Whelan	Ireland	0.253	23.78	q
5	7	Sabina Veit	Slovenia	0.205	23.78	
6	2	Elin Backman	Sweden	0.217	24.13	
				Wind: -2.6 m/s		

==== Heat 2 ====
Rank	Lane	Name	Nationality	React	Time	Notes
DQ	8	Anastasia Kapachinskaya	Russia		~~23.09~~	Q, Doping
1	5	Eleni Artymata	Cyprus	0.236	23.41	Q
2	7	Emily Freeman	Great Britain & N.I.	0.230	23.44	Q
3	3	Weronika Wedler	Poland	0.192	23.62	q
4	6	Sónia Tavares	Portugal	0.208	24.14	
5	4	Doris Röser	Austria	0.246	24.32	
	2	Klodiana Shala	Albania		DNS	
				Wind: -2.1 m/s		

==== Heat 3 ====
Rank	Lane	Name	Nationality	React	Time	Notes
DQ	4	Yuliya Chermoshanskaya	Russia	0.201	~~23.00~~	Q, Doping
1	5	Lina Jacques-Sébastien	France	0.212	23.11	Q
2	2	Ewelina Ptak	Poland	0.186	23.56	Q
3	6	Alena Neumiarzhitskaya	Belarus	0.240	23.72	
4	3	Andreea Ograzeanu	Romania	0.216	23.89	
5	7	Barbara Petráhn	Hungary	0.197	23.97	
				Wind: -1.2 m/s		

==== Heat 4 ====
Rank	Lane	Name	Nationality	React	Time	Notes
1	5	Aleksandra Fedoriva	Russia	0.263	23.47	Q
2	3	Véronique Mang	France	0.178	23.57	Q
3	2	Olivia Borlée	Belgium	0.199	23.59	Q
4	4	Marta Jeschke	Poland	0.190	23.60	q
5	8	Giulia Arcioni	Italy	0.242	23.63	q
6	6	Tina Jures	Slovenia	0.176	24.41	
7	7	Meliz Redif	Turkey	0.253	24.53	
				Wind: -3.5 m/s		

==== Summary ====
Rank	Heat	Lane	Name	Nationality	React	Time	Notes
DQ	2	8	Anastasia Kapachinskaya	Russia		~~23.09~~	Q, Doping
1	1	4	Yelizaveta Bryzhina	Ukraine	0.245	23.10	Q
DQ	3	4	Yuliya Chermoshanskaya	Russia	0.201	~~23.10~~	Q, Doping
2	3	5	Lina Jacques-Sébastien	France	0.212	23.21	Q
3	1	6	Myriam Soumaré	France	0.179	23.22	Q
4	2	5	Eleni Artymata	Cyprus	0.236	23.41	Q
5	2	7	Emily Freeman	Great Britain & N.I.	0.230	23.44	Q
6	4	5	Aleksandra Fedoriva	Russia	0.263	23.47	Q
7	4	3	Véronique Mang	France	0.178	23.57	Q
8	4	2	Olivia Borlée	Belgium	0.199	23.59	Q
9	4	4	Marta Jeschke	Poland	0.190	23.60	q
10	2	3	Weronika Wedler	Poland	0.192	23.62	q
11	4	8	Giulia Arcioni	Italy	0.242	23.63	q
12	3	2	Ewelina Ptak	Poland	0.186	23.66	Q
13	1	3	Ksenija Balta	Estonia	0.205	23.75	Q
14	1	5	Niamh Whelan	Ireland	0.253	23.78	q
15	1	7	Sabina Veit	Slovenia	0.205	23.78	
16	3	6	Alena Neumiarzhitskaya	Belarus	0.240	23.82	
17	3	3	Andreea Ograzeanu	Romania	0.216	23.89	
18	3	7	Barbara Petráhn	Hungary	0.197	24.07	
19	1	2	Elin Backman	Sweden	0.217	24.13	
20	2	6	Sónia Tavares	Portugal	0.208	24.14	
21	2	4	Doris Röser	Austria	0.246	24.32	
22	4	6	Tina Jures	Slovenia	0.176	24.41	
23	4	7	Meliz Redif	Turkey	0.253	24.53	
	2	2	Klodiana Shala	Albania		DNS	

=== Semifinals ===
First 3 in each heat and 2 best performers advance to the Final.

==== Semifinal 1 ====
Rank	Lane	Name	Nationality	React	Time	Notes
1	3	Aleksandra Fedoriva	Russia	0.205	22.63	Q
DQ	6	Anastasia Kapachinskaya	Russia	0.233	~~22.72~~	Q, Doping
2	5	Lina Jacques-Sébastien	France	0.211	22.84	Q, PB
3	4	Véronique Mang	France	0.199	23.21	q
4	8	Emily Freeman	Great Britain & N.I.	0.224	23.21	SB
5	2	Niamh Whelan	Ireland	0.203	23.31	
6	1	Marta Jeschke	Poland	0.177	23.36	SB
	7	Ksenija Balta	Estonia	0.245	DQ	
				Wind: -0.2 m/s		

==== Semifinal 2 ====
Rank	Lane	Name	Nationality	React	Time	Notes
1	4	Yelizaveta Bryzhina	Ukraine	0.233	22.86	Q
DQ	6	Yuliya Chermoshanskaya	Russia	0.210	~~22.88~~	Q, Doping
2	3	Myriam Soumaré	France	0.191	23.02	Q
3	5	Eleni Artymata	Cyprus	0.254	23.14	q
4	2	Weronika Wedler	Poland	0.192	23.30	
5	8	Olivia Borlée	Belgium	0.229	23.44	
6	7	Ewelina Ptak	Poland		23.48	
7	1	Giulia Arcioni	Italy	0.167	23.77	
				Wind: -1.7 m/s		

==== Summary ====
Rank	Heat	Lane	Name	Nationality	React	Time	Notes
1	1	3	Aleksandra Fedoriva	Russia	0.205	22.63	Q
DQ	1	6	Anastasia Kapachinskaya	Russia	0.233	~~22.72~~	Q, Doping
2	1	5	Lina Jacques-Sébastien	France	0.211	22.84	Q, PB
3	2	4	Yelizaveta Bryzhina	Ukraine	0.233	22.86	Q
DQ	2	6	Yuliya Chermoshanskaya	Russia	0.210	~~22.88~~	Q, Doping
4	2	3	Myriam Soumaré	France	0.191	23.02	Q
5	2	5	Eleni Artymata	Cyprus	0.254	23.14	q
6	1	4	Véronique Mang	France	0.199	23.21	q
7	1	8	Emily Freeman	Great Britain & N.I.	0.224	23.21	SB
8	2	2	Weronika Wedler	Poland	0.192	23.30	
9	1	2	Niamh Whelan	Ireland	0.203	23.31	
10	1	1	Marta Jeschke	Poland	0.177	23.36	SB
11	2	8	Olivia Borlée	Belgium	0.229	23.44	
12	2	7	Ewelina Ptak	Poland		23.48	
13	2	1	Giulia Arcioni	Italy	0.167	23.77	
	1	7	Ksenija Balta	Estonia	0.245	DQ	

=== Final ===
Wind : +0.1 m/s

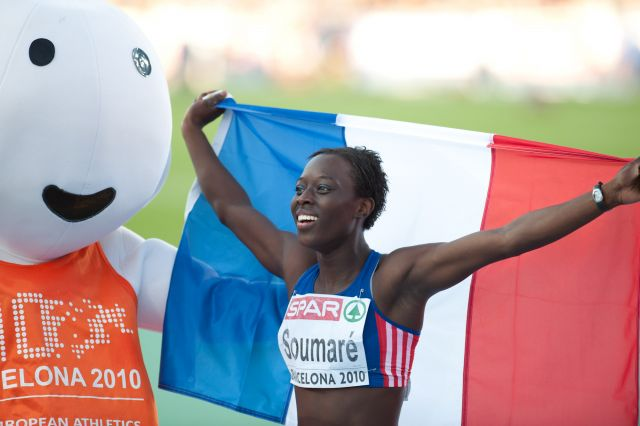
Myriam Soumaré won the gold with a personal best run

Rank	Lane	Name	Nationality	Time	Notes
1st place, gold medalist(s)	8	Myriam Soumaré	France	22.32	EL, PB
2nd place, silver medalist(s)	3	Yelizaveta Bryzhina	Ukraine	22.44	PB
3rd place, bronze medalist(s)	5	Aleksandra Fedoriva	Russia	22.44	
DQ	6	Anastasia Kapachinskaya	Russia	~~22.47~~	SB, Doping
4	7	Lina Jacques-Sébastien	France	22.59	PB
5	2	Eleni Artymata	Cyprus	22.61	NR
DQ	4	Yuliya Chermoshanskaya	Russia	~~22.67~~	SB, Doping
	1	Véronique Mang	France	DQ	
