= Turkey at the 2010 European Athletics Championships =

- WA code: TUR

in Barcelona
- Medals Ranked 6th: Gold 3 Silver 0 Bronze 0 Total 3

European Athletics Championships appearances (overview)
- 1950; 1954; 1958; 1962; 1966; 1969; 1971; 1974; 1978; 1982; 1986; 1990; 1994; 1998; 2002; 2006; 2010; 2012; 2014; 2016; 2018; 2022; 2024

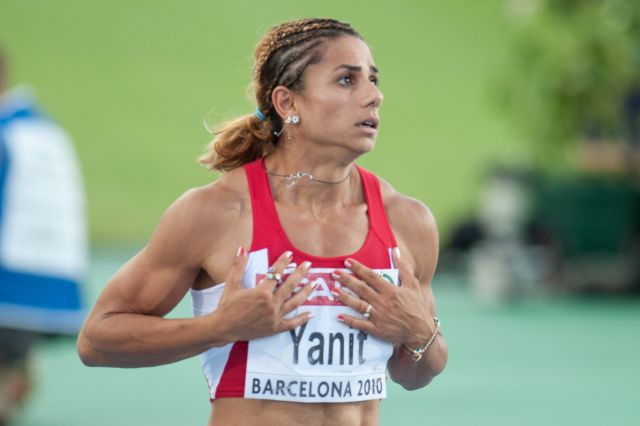

Turkey was represented by 20 athletes, among them 12 women, at the 2010 European Athletics Championships held between July 27 and August 1 in Barcelona, Spain.

Turkey ranked fifth in the countries' medal table. With three gold and one silver medals that have been won all by female athletes, it was Turkey's most successful European championship. Placing two athletes at the first and second positions at one event, Women's 5000 metres, crowned Turkey's participation.

== Participants ==
Event	Men	Women
100 m	İzzet Safer	
200 m	İzzet Safer	Meliz Redif
400 m		Meliz Redif; Pınar Saka
1500 m		Aslı Çakır; Binnaz Uslu; Sultan Haydar
3000 m steeplechase		Binnaz Uslu
5000 m	Halil Akkaş; Kemal Koyuncu; Mert Girmalegese	Alemitu Bekele; Elvan Abeylegesse; Meryem Erdoğan
10000 m	Kemal Koyuncu	Elvan Abeylegesse; Meryem Erdoğan
100 m hurdles		Nevin Yanıt
400 m hurdles	Tuncay Ors	Birsen Engin; Özge Gürler
High Jump		Burcu Ayhan
4 × 100 m	Hakan Karacaoğlu; İzzet Safer; Mustafa Delioğlu; Sezayi Özkaya	
4 × 400 m		Birsen Engin; Meliz Redif; Pinar Saka; Özge Gürler

== Results ==
2010 Barcelona	Gold	Silver	Bronze	Total
Turkey (TUR)	3	1	0	4

=== Men ===
Track and road events

Event	Athletes	Heat Round 1		Heat Round 2		Semifinal		Final	
Event	Athletes	Result	Rank	Result	Rank	Result	Rank	Result	Rank
100 m	İzzet Safer	10.68	7	-	-	-	-	Did not advance	
200 m	İzzet Safer	21.41	7	-	-	-	-	Did not advance	
5000 m	Halil Akkaş	14:07.42	10	-	-	-	-	Did not advance	
5000 m	Kemal Koyuncu	13:47.41	7	-	-	-	-	14:17.32	13
5000 m	Mert Girmalegese	13:36.32	5	-	-	-	-	13:45.25	9
4 × 100 m	Hakan Karacaoğlu İzzet Safer Mustafa Delioğlu Sezai Özkaya	40.23	7	-	-	-	-	Did not advance	
10000 m	Kemal Koyuncu	-	-	-	-	-	-	30:28.83	22
400 m H	Tuncay Örs	51.41	6	-	-	-	-	Did not advance	

=== Women ===
Track and road events

Event	Athletes	Heat Round 1		Heat Round 2		Semifinal		Final	
Event	Athletes	Result	Rank	Result	Rank	Result	Rank	Result	Rank
200 m	Meliz Redif	24.53	7	-	-	-	-	Did not advance	
400 m	Meliz Redif	54.19	7	-	-	-	-	Did not advance	
400 m	Pınar Saka	54.33	7	-	-	-	-	Did not advance	
1500 m	Aslı Çakır	4:05.53	1	-	-	-	-	4:02.17	5
1500 m	Binnaz Uslu	4:12.04	10	-	-	-	-	Did not advance	
1500 m	Sultan Haydar	Did not finish		-	-	-	-	Did not advance	
3000 m S	Binnaz Uslu	10:15.28	9	-	-	-	-	Did not advance	
5000 m	Alemitu Bekele	-	-	-	-	-	-	14:52.20 CR	1
5000 m	Elvan Abeylegesse	-	-	-	-	-	-	14:54.44	2
5000 m	Meryem Erdoğan	-	-	-	-	-	-	15:14.92 PB	7
10000 m	Elvan Abeylegesse	-	-	-	-	-	-	31:10.23 EL	1
10000 m	Meryem Erdoğan	-	-	-	-	-	-	31:44.86 PB	5
100 m H	Nevin Yanıt	12.89	1	-	-	12.71	1	12.63 NR	1
400 m H	Birsen Engin	58.19	6	-	-	-	-	Did not advance	
400 m H	Özge Gürler	58.98	8	-	-	-	-	Did not advance	
4 × 400 m	Birsen Engin Meliz Redif Pınar Saka Özge Gürler	3:33.13	5	-	-	-	-	Did not advance	

Field events

Event	Athletes	Qualification		Final	
Event	Athletes	Result	Rank	Result	Rank
High jump	Burcu Ayhan	1.92	5	1.92	9

== Medalists ==
Event	Athletes	Heats		Semifinal		Final	
Event	Athletes	Result	Rank	Result	Rank	Result	Rank
10000 m	Elvan Abeylegesse					31:10.23 EL	Gold medal
100 m H	Nevin Yanıt					12.63 NR	Gold medal
5000 m	Alemitu Bekele					14:52.20 CR	Gold medal
5000 m	Elvan Abeylegesse					14:54.44	Silver medal
