= 2010 European Athletics Championships – Men's 10,000 metres =

Men's 10,000 metres at the European Athletics Championships

The men's 10,000 metres at the 2010 European Athletics Championships was held at the Estadi Olímpic Lluís Companys on 27 July. Mo Farah won the gold medal.

== Medalists ==
Gold	(United Kingdom) Mo Farah; Great Britain (GBR)
Silver	(United Kingdom) Chris Thompson; Great Britain (GBR)
Bronze	Daniele Meucci; Italy (ITA)

== Records ==
Standing records prior to the 2010 European Athletics Championships
World record	Kenenisa Bekele (ETH)	26:17.53	Brussels, Belgium	26 August 2005
European record	Mohammed Mourhit (BEL)	26:52.30	Brussels, Belgium	3 September 1999
Championship record	Martti Vainio (FIN)	27:30.99	Prague, Czechoslovakia	29 August 1978
World Leading	Chris Solinsky (USA)	26:59.60	Palo Alto, CA, United States	1 May 2010
European Leading	Mo Farah (GBR)	27:28.86	Marseille, France	5 June 2010

== Schedule ==
Date	Time	Round
27 July 2010	21:05	Final

== Results ==
=== Final ===
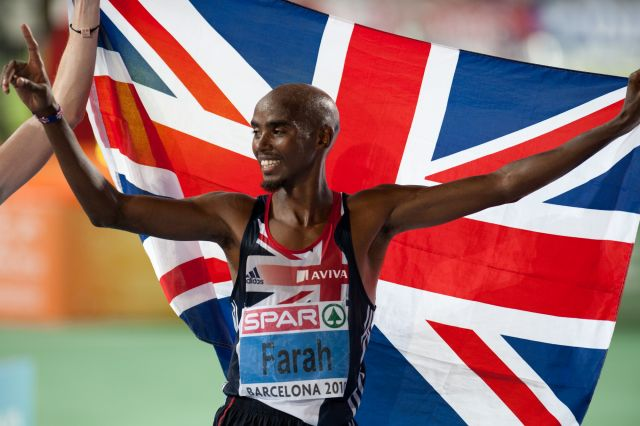
Mo Farah won his first major title at the championships.

Rank	Name	Nationality	Time	Notes
1st place, gold medalist(s)	Mo Farah	Great Britain & N.I.	28:24.99	
2nd place, silver medalist(s)	Chris Thompson	Great Britain & N.I.	28:27.33	
3rd place, bronze medalist(s)	Daniele Meucci	Italy	28:27.33	
4	Ayad Lamdassem	Spain	28:34.89	
5	Carles Castillejo	Spain	28:49.69	Season Best
6	Christian Belz	Switzerland	28:54.01	Season Best
7	Andrea Lalli	Italy	29:05.20	
8	Youssef El Kalay	Portugal	29:07.61	
9	Christian Glatting	Germany	29:09.84	
10	Abdellatif Meftah	France	29:14.74	
11	Marcin Chabowski	Poland	29:15.65	
12	Jan Fitschen	Germany	29:16.59	
13	Jussi Utriainen	Finland	29:16.87	
14	Sondre Nordstad Moen	Norway	29:19.63	
15	Filmon Ghirmai	Germany	29:28.31	
16	Stsiapan Rahautsou	Belarus	29:40.19	
17	Matti Räsänen	Finland	29:45.95	
18	Pavel Shapovalov	Russia	29:50.02	
19	José Rocha	Portugal	29:50.41	
20	Moges Tesseme	Israel	29:50.78	
21	Marius Ionescu	Romania	30:21.76	
22	Kemal Koyuncu	Turkey	30:28.83	
	Manuel Ángel Penas	Spain	DNF	
	Monder Rizki	Belgium	DNF	
	Michael Schmid	Austria	DNF	
	Rui Pedro Silva	Portugal	DNF	
