= 2010 European Athletics Championships – Women's 400 metres =

Women's 400 metres at the European Athletics Championships
- Venue: Estadi Olímpic Lluís Companys
- Location: Barcelona, Spain
- Dates: 28 and 30 July 2010
- Winning time: 49.89 s

Medalists
gold medal	Tatyana Firova	Russia
silver medal	Kseniya Ustalova	Russia
bronze medal	Antonina Krivoshapka	Russia

The women's 400 metres at the 2010 European Athletics Championships was held at the Estadi Olímpic Lluís Companys on 28 and 30 July.

== Records ==
Standing records prior to the 2010 European Athletics Championships
World record	Marita Koch (GDR)	47.60	Canberra, Australia	6 October 1985
European record	Marita Koch (GDR)	47.60	Canberra, Australia	6 October 1985
Championship record	Marita Koch (GDR)	48.16	Athens, Greece	8 September 1982
World Leading	Debbie Dunn (USA)	49.64	Des Moines, United States	26 June 2010
European Leading	Anastasiya Kapachinskaya (RUS)	50.16	Moscow, Russia	29 June 2010
Broken records during the 2010 European Athletics Championships
European Leading	Tatyana Firova (RUS)	49.89	Barcelona, Spain	30 July 2010

== Schedule ==
Date	Time	Round
28 July 2010	18:35	Round 1
30 July 2010	19:35	Final

== Results ==
=== Round 1 ===
==== Heat 1 ====
Rank	Lane	Name	Nationality	React	Time	Notes
1	6	Antonina Krivoshapka	Russia	0.211	51.52	Q
2	7	Denisa Rosolová	Czech Republic	0.222	52.34	Q
3	2	Maris Mägi	Estonia	0.288	52.85	
4	3	Lee McConnell	Great Britain & N.I.	0.284	53.15	
5	5	Darya Prystupa	Ukraine	0.318	53.48	
6	8	Agata Bednarek	Poland	0.218	54.16	
DQ	4	Pınar Saka	Turkey		~~54.33~~	Doping
7	1	Jasna Horozić	Bosnia and Herzegovina	0.274	55.97	

==== Heat 2 ====
Rank	Lane	Name	Nationality	React	Time	Notes
1	7	Tatyana Firova	Russia	0.198	51.11	Q
2	8	Antonina Yefremova	Ukraine		51.67	Q
3	2	Marta Milani	Italy	0.202	52.36	q
4	1	Virginie Michanol	France	0.216	52.37	
5	5	Helene Nordquist	Sweden	0.274	53.78	
6	6	Barbara Petráhn	Hungary	0.183	53.78	
7	3	Meliz Redif	Turkey	0.257	54.19	
8	4	Begoña Garrido	Spain	0.260	54.65	

==== Heat 3 ====
Rank	Lane	Name	Nationality	React	Time	Notes
1	8	Kseniya Ustalova	Russia	0.219	50.96	Q
2	4	Libania Grenot	Italy	0.231	51.03	Q, SB
3	7	Muriel Hurtis-Houairi	France	0.181	51.97	q
4	5	Joanne Cuddihy	Ireland	0.193	52.58	
5	6	Kseniya Karandyuk	Ukraine		53.18	
6	2	Jitka Bartoničková	Czech Republic	0.283	54.16	
	3	Agní Dervéni	Greece	0.227	DQ	

==== Summary ====
Rank	Heat	Lane	Name	Nationality	React	Time	Notes
1	3	8	Kseniya Ustalova	Russia		50.96	Q
2	3	4	Libania Grenot	Italy		51.03	Q, SB
3	2	7	Tatyana Firova	Russia		51.11	Q
4	1	6	Antonina Krivoshapka	Russia		51.52	Q
5	2	8	Antonina Yefremova	Ukraine		51.67	Q
6	3	7	Muriel Hurtis-Houairi	France		51.97	q
7	1	7	Denisa Rosolová	Czech Republic		52.34	Q
8	2	2	Marta Milani	Italy		52.36	q
9	2	1	Virginie Michanol	France		52.37	
10	3	5	Joanne Cuddihy	Ireland		52.58	
11	1	2	Maris Mägi	Estonia		52.85	
12	1	3	Lee McConnell	Great Britain & N.I.		53.15	
13	3	6	Kseniya Karandyuk	Ukraine		53.18	
14	1	5	Darya Prystupa	Ukraine		53.48	
15	2	5	Helene Nordquist	Sweden		53.78	
16	2	6	Barbara Petráhn	Hungary		53.78	
17	3	2	Jitka Bartoničková	Czech Republic		54.16	
17	1	8	Agata Bednarek	Poland		54.16	
19	2	3	Meliz Redif	Turkey		54.19	
DQ	1	4	Pınar Saka	Turkey		~~54.33~~	Doping
20	2	4	Begoña Garrido	Spain		54.65	
21	1	1	Jasna Horozić	Bosnia and Herzegovina		55.97	
	3	3	Agní Dervéni	Greece			DSQ

=== Final ===
Rank	Lane	Name	Nationality	React	Time	Notes
DQ	5	Tatyana Firova	Russia	0.200	49.89	EL
1st place, gold medalist(s)	4	Kseniya Ustalova	Russia	0.229	49.92	PB
2nd place, silver medalist(s)	3	Antonina Krivoshapka	Russia	0.205	50.10	SB
3rd place, bronze medalist(s)	6	Libania Grenot	Italy	0.323	50.43	SB
4	7	Denisa Rosolová	Czech Republic	0.319	50.90	
5	8	Antonina Yefremova	Ukraine		51.67	
6	1	Marta Milani	Italy	0.185	51.87	PB
7	2	Muriel Hurtis-Houairi	France	0.194	52.05	
