= 2010 European Athletics Championships – Women's 1500 metres =

Women's 1500 metres at the European Athletics Championships

The women's 1500 metres at the 2010 European Athletics Championships will be held at the Estadi Olímpic Lluís Companys on 30 July and 1 August.

== Medalists ==
Gold	Nuria Fernández; Spain (ESP)
Silver	Hind Dehiba; France (FRA)
Bronze	Natalia Rodríguez; Spain (ESP)

== Records ==
Standing records prior to the 2010 European Athletics Championships
World record	Qu Yunxia (CHN)	3:50.46	Beijing, China	11 September 1993
European record	Tatyana Kazankina (URS)	3:52.47	Zürich, Switzerland	13 August 1980
Championship record	Tatyana Tomashova (RUS)	3:56.91	Gothenburg, Sweden	13 August 2006
World Leading	Anna Alminova (RUS)	3:57.65	Saint-Denis, France	16 July 2010
European Leading	Anna Alminova (RUS)	3:57.65	Saint-Denis, France	16 July 2010

== Schedule ==
Date	Time	Round
30 July 2010	20:00	Round 1
1 August 2010	21:15	Final

== Results ==
=== Round 1 ===
==== Heat 1 ====
Rank	Name	Nationality	Time	Notes
DQ	Anna Alminova	Russia	~~4:04.14~~	Q, Doping
1	Fanjanteino Félix	France	4:04.75	Q
2	Natalia Rodríguez	Spain	4:04.95	Q, SB
3	Oksana Zbrozhek	Russia	4:05.18	Q
4	Anna Mishchenko	Ukraine	4:05.59	q
5	Stephanie Twell	Great Britain & N.I.	4:05.63	q
6	Sylwia Ejdys	Poland	4:05.76	q
7	Hannah England	Great Britain & N.I.	4:06.03	q
DQ	Natallia Kareiva	Belarus	~~4:06.89~~	Doping
9	Binnaz Uslu	Turkey	4:12.04	
	Sultan Haydar	Turkey	DNF	

==== Heat 2 ====
Rank	Name	Nationality	Time	Notes
DQ	Aslı Çakır	Turkey	~~4:05.53~~	Q, Doping
1	Lisa Dobriskey	Great Britain & N.I.	4:06.00	Q
2	Nuria Fernández	Spain	4:06.03	Q
3	Hind Dehiba	France	4:06.17	Q
4	Renata Pliś	Poland	4:07.20	
5	Ingvill Måkestad Bovim	Norway	4:07.49	
DQ	Natalya Yevdokimova	Russia	~~4:08.08~~	Doping
6	Charlotte Schönbeck	Sweden	4:09.42	PB
7	Lindsey de Grande	Belgium	4:10.24	PB
8	Susan Kuijken	Netherlands	4:11.03	
9	Marina Munćan	Serbia	4:19.32	
	Liliana Barbulescu	Romania	DNF	

==== Summary ====
Rank	Heat	Name	Nationality	Time	Notes
DQ	1	Anna Alminova	Russia	~~4:04.14~~	Q, Doping
1	1	Fanjanteino Félix	France	4:04.75	Q
2	1	Natalia Rodríguez	Spain	4:04.95	Q, SB
3	1	Oksana Zbrozhek	Russia	4:05.18	Q
~~5~~	2	Aslı Çakır	Turkey	~~4:05.53~~	Q, Doping
4	1	Anna Mishchenko	Ukraine	4:05.59	q
5	1	Stephanie Twell	Great Britain & N.I.	4:05.63	q
6	1	Sylwia Ejdys	Poland	4:05.76	q
7	2	Lisa Dobriskey	Great Britain & N.I.	4:06.00	Q
8	1	Hannah England	Great Britain & N.I.	4:06.03	q
8	2	Nuria Fernández	Spain	4:06.03	Q
10	2	Hind Dehiba	France	4:06.17	Q
DQ	1	Natallia Kareiva	Belarus	~~4:06.89~~	Doping
11	2	Renata Pliś	Poland	4:07.20	
12	2	Ingvill Måkestad Bovim	Norway	4:07.49	
DQ	2	Natalya Yevdokimova	Russia	~~4:08.08~~	Doping
13	2	Charlotte Schönbeck	Sweden	4:09.42	PB
14	2	Lindsey de Grande	Belgium	4:10.24	PB
15	2	Susan Kuijken	Netherlands	4:11.03	
16	1	Binnaz Uslu	Turkey	4:12.04	
17	2	Marina Munćan	Serbia	4:19.32	
	2	Liliana Barbulescu	Romania	DNF	
	1	Sultan Haydar	Turkey	DNF	

=== Final ===
Rank	Name	Nationality	Time	Notes
1st place, gold medalist(s)	Nuria Fernández	Spain	4:00.20	PB
2nd place, silver medalist(s)	Hind Dehiba	France	4:01.17	
3rd place, bronze medalist(s)	Natalia Rodríguez	Spain	4:01.30	SB
4	Lisa Dobriskey	Great Britain & N.I.	4:01.54	
~~DQ~~	Aslı Çakır	Turkey	~~4:02.17~~	~~PB~~, Doping
~~DQ~~	Anna Alminova	Russia	~~4:02.24~~	Doping
5	Stephanie Twell	Great Britain & N.I.	4:02.70	PB
6	Fanjanteino Félix	France	4:04.16	
7	Oksana Zbrozhek	Russia	4:04.91	SB
8	Hannah England	Great Britain & N.I.	4:05.07	
9	Anna Mishchenko	Ukraine	4:07.22	
10	Sylwia Ejdys	Poland	4:24.82	
