= 2010 European Athletics Championships – Men's 5000 metres =

Men's 5000 metres at the European Athletics Championships

The men's 5000 metres at the 2010 European Athletics Championships was held at the Estadi Olímpic Lluís Companys on 29 and 31 July.

== Medalists ==
Gold	(United Kingdom) Mo Farah; Great Britain (GBR)
Silver	Jesús España; Spain (ESP)
Bronze	Hayle Ibrahimov; Azerbaijan (AZE)

== Records ==
Standing records prior to the 2010 European Athletics Championships
World record	Kenenisa Bekele (ETH)	12:37.35	Hengelo, Netherlands	31 May 2004
European record	Mohammed Mourhit (BEL)	12:49.71	Brussels, Belgium	25 August 2000
Championship record	Jack Buckner (GBR)	13:10.15	Stuttgart, West Germany	31 August 1986
World Leading	Eliud Kipchoge (KEN)	12:51.21	Doha, Qatar	14 May 2010
European Leading	Alemayehu Bezabeh (ESP)	12:57.25	Oslo, Norway	4 June 2010

== Schedule ==
Date	Time	Round
29 July 2010	18:45	Round 1
31 July 2010	21:20	Final

== Results ==
=== Round 1 ===
==== Heat 1 ====
Rank	Name	Nationality	Time	Notes
1	Hayle Ibrahimov	Azerbaijan	13:32.98	Q, NR
2	Alemayehu Bezabeh	Spain	13:34.44	Q
3	Daniele Meucci	Italy	13:35.02	Q, SB
4	Chris Thompson	Great Britain & N.I.	13:35.58	Q
5	Mert Girmalegese	Turkey	13:36.32	Q
6	Alistair Cragg	Ireland	13:37.66	q
7	Arne Gabius	Germany	13:39.78	q
8	Aleksandr Orlov	Russia	13:41.44	q
9	Tiidrek Nurme	Estonia	13:49.19	
10	Eduard Mbengani	Portugal	13:50.22	
11	Gezachw Yossef	Israel	13:55.97	
12	Philipp Bandi	Switzerland	13:58.11	
13	Matti Räsänen	Finland	14:01.35	
14	Sindre Buraas	Norway	14:03.93	
	Oskar Käck	Sweden	DNF	

==== Heat 2 ====
Rank	Name	Nationality	Time	Notes
1	Mo Farah	Great Britain & N.I.	13:38.26	Q
2	Jesús España	Spain	13:38.47	Q
3	Sergio Sánchez	Spain	13:38.48	Q
4	Noureddine Smaïl	France	13:38.49	Q
5	Serhiy Lebid	Ukraine	13:38.51	Q
6	Stefano La Rosa	Italy	13:38.71	q
7	Kemal Koyuncu	Turkey	13:47.41	q
8	Yevgeniy Rybakov	Russia	13:52.58	
9	Sondre Nordstad Moen	Norway	13:53.69	
10	Halil Akkaş	Turkey	14:07.42	
11	Mark Christie	Ireland	14:12.68	
12	Jussi Utriainen	Finland	14:17.07	
13	Johan Wallerstein	Sweden	14:43.34	
	Youssef El Kalay	Portugal	DNS	

==== Summary ====
Rank	Heat	Name	Nationality	Time	Notes
1	1	Hayle Ibrahimov	Azerbaijan	13:32.98	Q, NR
2	1	Alemayehu Bezabeh	Spain	13:34.44	Q
3	1	Daniele Meucci	Italy	13:35.02	Q, SB
4	1	Chris Thompson	Great Britain & N.I.	13:35.58	Q
5	1	Mert Girmalegese	Turkey	13:36.32	Q
6	1	Alistair Cragg	Ireland	13:37.66	q
7	2	Mo Farah	Great Britain & N.I.	13:38.26	Q
8	2	Jesús España	Spain	13:38.47	Q
9	2	Sergio Sánchez	Spain	13:38.48	Q
10	2	Noureddine Smaïl	France	13:38.49	Q
11	2	Serhiy Lebid	Ukraine	13:38.51	Q
12	2	Stefano La Rosa	Italy	13:38.71	q
13	1	Arne Gabius	Germany	13:39.78	q
14	1	Aleksandr Orlov	Russia	13:41.44	q
15	2	Kemal Koyuncu	Turkey	13:47.41	q
16	1	Tiidrek Nurme	Estonia	13:49.19	
17	1	Eduard Mbengani	Portugal	13:50.22	
18	2	Yevgeniy Rybakov	Russia	13:52.58	
19	2	Sondre Nordstad Moen	Norway	13:53.69	
20	1	Gezachw Yossef	Israel	13:55.97	
21	1	Philipp Bandi	Switzerland	13:58.11	
22	1	Matti Räsänen	Finland	14:01.35	
23	1	Sindre Buraas	Norway	14:03.93	
24	2	Halil Akkaş	Turkey	14:07.42	
25	2	Mark Christie	Ireland	14:12.68	
26	2	Jussi Utriainen	Finland	14:17.07	
27	2	Johan Wallerstein	Sweden	14:43.34	
	1	Oskar Käck	Sweden	DNF	
	2	Youssef El Kalay	Portugal	DNS	

=== Final ===
Rank	Name	Nationality	Time	Notes
1st place, gold medalist(s)	Mo Farah	Great Britain & N.I.	13:31.18	
2nd place, silver medalist(s)	Jesús España	Spain	13:33.12	
3rd place, bronze medalist(s)	Hayle Ibrahimov	Azerbaijan	13.34.15	
4	Serhiy Lebid	Ukraine	13:38.69	
5	Noureddine Smaïl	France	13:38.70	
6	Daniele Meucci	Italy	13:40.17	
7	Alemayehu Bezabeh	Spain	13:43.23	
8	Chris Thompson	Great Britain & N.I.	13:44.42	
9	Mert Girmalegese	Turkey	13:45.25	
10	Stefano La Rosa	Italy	13:46.58	
11	Aleksandr Orlov	Russia	13:58.69	
12	Arne Gabius	Germany	13:59.11	
13	Kemal Koyuncu	Turkey	14:17.32	
	Alistair Cragg	Ireland	DNF	
	Sergio Sánchez	Spain	DNF	
