= Sultan Haydar =

Turkish long-distance runner (born 1987)

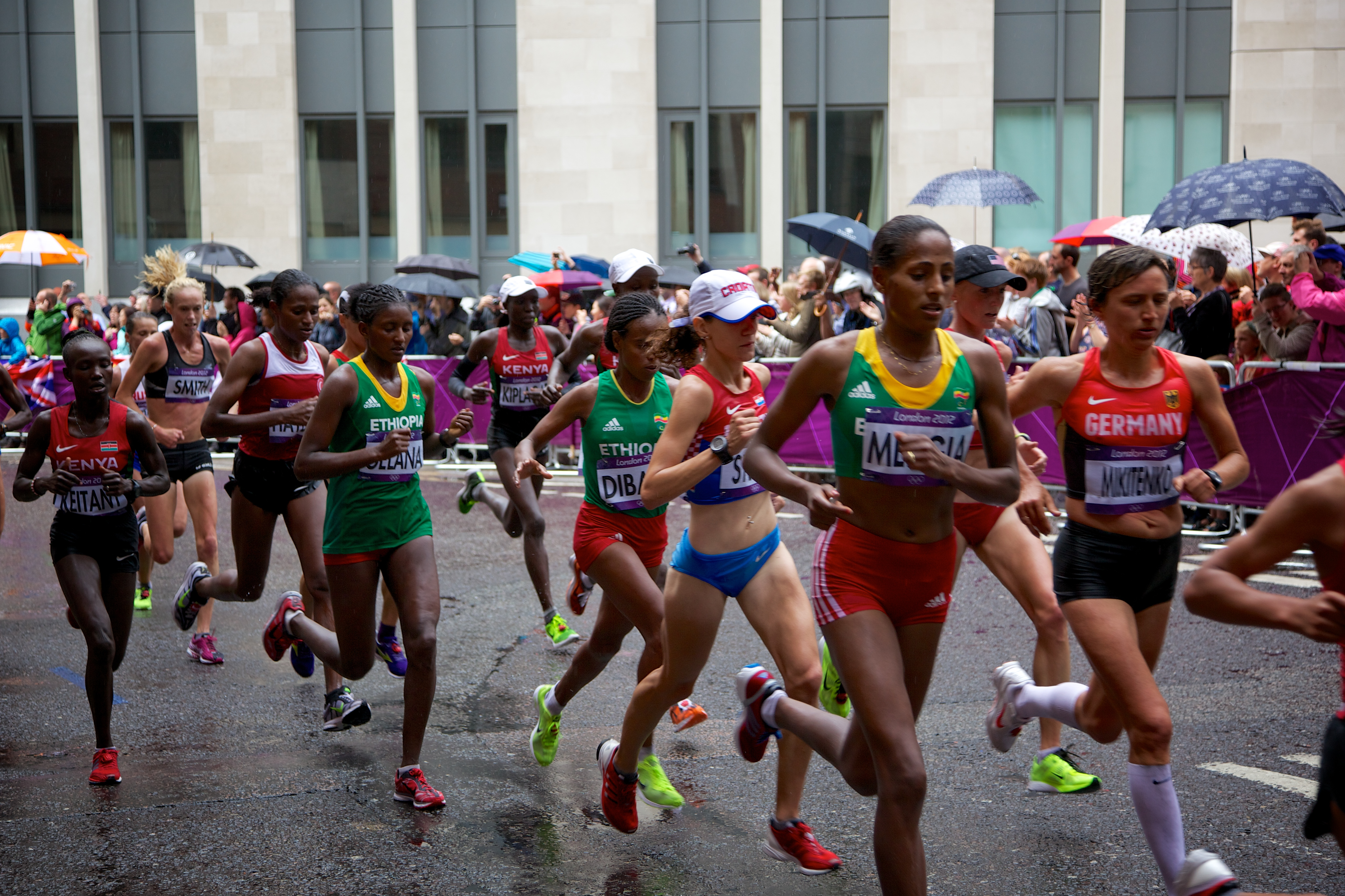
- Women's Marathon London 2012

Personal information
- Nationality: Turkish
- Born: Chaltu Girma Meshesha; 23 May 1987 (age 39) Golerogi, Ethiopia
- Height: 170 cm (5 ft 7 in)
- Weight: 55 kg (121 lb)

Sport
- Sport: Running
- Events: 1500 metres, 3000 metres
- Club: Enkaspor Athletics Team
- Coached by: Nikola Borić
Medal record
Representing Turkey
Women's athletics
European Cross Country Championships
Gold medal – first place	2009 Dublin	1500 m
European Athletics U23 Championships
Gold medal – first place	2009 Kaunas	1500 m

Sultan Haydar (pronounced [sulˈtan ˈhajdaɾ]; born Chaltu Girma Meshesha, 23 May 1987 in Golerogi, Ethiopia) is an Ethiopian-born Turkish long-distance runner. The 170 cm (5 ft 7 in) tall athlete at 55 kg (121 lb) was a member of Enkaspor, where she was coached by Nikola Borić.

Haydar is currently serving a 30-month competition ban set to expire in July 2026 in relation to an anti-doping rule violation.

== Career ==
Haydar started off her career representing Ethiopia as a middle-distance runner and was the bronze medalist in the 800 metres at the 2005 African Junior Athletics Championships. She transferred her eligibility to Turkey in 2008.

Haydar's first competition for Turkey was the 2008 European Cross Country Championships. She started the women's under-23 race quickly but yielded her early lead and dropped out at the halfway point. She was the 1500 metres gold medalist at the 2009 European Athletics U23 Championships, then won the under-23 race at the 2009 European Cross Country Championships later that year. At the beginning of 2011 she made her debut over the half marathon and recorded a time of 1:10:02 hours for seventh place at the high calibre RAK Half Marathon. She ran in the 1500m at the 2010 European Athletics Championships but failed to finish her heat. She turned to the 3000 metres at the 2011 European Athletics Indoor Championships, where she set a personal best of 9:03.50 minutes to win her heat, but was slower in the final, coming in ninth place. Outdoors, she competed for Turkey on home soil for the First League of the 2011 European Team Championships and won the 3000 m in a long-distance event sweep with Alemitu Bekele Degfa and Binnaz Uslu. Haydar also won the bronze in the 1500m.

She was the leader for much of the 2011 Istanbul Marathon but slowed after 35 km and eventually finished seventh. The 2012 Paris Marathon saw her establish herself as a top-level marathon runner. In spite of being well-beaten by winner Tirfi Tsegaye Beyene, Haydar improved her best by over ten minutes to set a Turkish national record mark of 2:25:07 hours in second place.

Sultan Haydar qualified for participation in the marathon event at the 2012 Summer Olympics but managed only 72nd place with a slow time of 2:38:26 hours. She ended the year with a third-place finish at the Istanbul Marathon. In her first marathon of 2013, she came third at the Rome City Marathon with a time of 2:27:10 hours. On 17 November 2013 Sultan Haydar repeated her third-place success at the Istanbul Marathon finishing with 2.29.40 after her countrywoman Elvan Abeylegesse.

=== Anti-doping rule violation ===
Following a provisional suspension in June 2024, in March 2025 Haydar was served with a 30-month competition ban set to expire in July 2026 for an anti-doping rule violation after failing to submit to a test in January 2024. In addition, all her results were disqualified from 31 January 2024 onwards.

== Achievements ==
Year	Competition	Venue	Position	Event	Notes
Representing Turkey
2009	European U23 Championships	Kaunas, Lithuania	1st	1500 m	4:14.12
2009	European Cross Country Championships	Dublin, Ireland	1st	Under-23 (6.039 km)	21:14
2010	European Championships	Barcelona, Spain	—	1500 m	DNF
2011	European Indoor Championships	Paris, France	8th	3000 m	9:08.84
2012	Istanbul Marathon	Istanbul, Turkey	3rd	Marathon	2:29:41
2013	Mediterranean Games	Mersin, Turkey	4th	Half Marathon	1:18:01
2013	Rome Marathon	Rome, Italy	3rd	Marathon	2:27:10
2013	Istanbul Marathon	Istanbul, Turkey	3rd	Marathon	2.29.40
2015	World Championships	Beijing, China	43rd	Marathon	2:47:11

== Personal bests ==
Surface	Event	Time	Date	Venue	Notes
Indoor track	3000m	9:03.50	Mar 5, 2011	Paris, FRA	
Outdoor track	1500m	4:10.9h	June 29, 2010	Izmir, TUR	
Outdoor track	3000m	9:04.55	June 23, 2011	Bursa, TUR	
Outdoor track	5000m	16:03.56	May 29, 2011	Antalya, TUR	
Road	Half Marathon	1:09:12	Oct 8, 2023	Ankara, TUR	
Road	Marathon	2:21:27	Dec 3, 2023	Valencia, ESP	NR
