= 2010 European Athletics Championships – Men's 20 kilometres walk =

Men's 20 kilometres walk at the European Athletics Championships

The men's 20 kilometres walk at the 2010 European Athletics Championships was held on the streets of Barcelona on 27 July.

The race was originally won by Russian race walker Stanislav Emelyanov, who in 2014 was banned due to irregularities in his biological passport, and stripped of the gold medal.

Italian Alex Schwazer was promoted to gold, with fourth-placed Rob Heffernan promoted to the bronze medal position.

== Medalists ==
Gold	Alex Schwazer; Italy (ITA)
Silver	João Vieira; Portugal (POR)
Bronze	(Republic of Ireland) Robert Heffernan; Ireland (IRL)

== Records ==
Standing records prior to the 2010 European Athletics Championships
World record	Vladimir Kanaykin (RUS)	1:17:16	Saransk, Russia	29 September 2007
European record	Vladimir Kanaykin (RUS)	1:17:16	Saransk, Russia	29 September 2007
Championship record	Paquillo Fernández (ESP)	1:18:37	Munich, Germany	6 August 2002
World Leading	Alex Schwazer (ITA)	1:18:24	Lugano, Switzerland	14 March 2010
European Leading	Alex Schwazer (ITA)	1:18:24	Lugano, Switzerland	14 March 2010

== Schedule ==
Date	Time	Round
27 July 2010	8:05	Final

== Results ==
=== Final ===
Rank	Athlete	Nationality	Time	Notes
DQ	Stanislav Emelyanov	Russia	~~1:20:10~~	Doping
1st place, gold medalist(s)	Alex Schwazer	Italy	1:20:38	
2nd place, silver medalist(s)	João Vieira	Portugal	1:20:49	SB
3rd place, bronze medalist(s)	Robert Heffernan	Ireland	1:21:00	
4	Giorgio Rubino	Italy	1:22:12	SB
5	Andrey Krivov	Russia	1:22:20	SB
6	Matej Tóth	Slovakia	1:22:20	
7	Jakub Jelonek	Poland	1:22:24	SB
8	Juan Manuel Molina	Spain	1:22:35	
9	Rafał Augustyn	Poland	1:22:40	
10	Andriy Kovenko	Ukraine	1:22:43	SB
11	Ruslan Dmytrenko	Ukraine	1:22:45	
12	Hervé Davaux	France	1:24:12	
13	Miguel Ángel López	Spain	1:24:28	
14	Silviu Casandra	Romania	1:24:51	
15	Maik Berger	Germany	1:25:01	
16	Anton Kucmin	Slovakia	1:25:12	
17	José Ignacio Díaz	Spain	1:25:36	
18	Dawid Tomala	Poland	1:25:50	
19	Jamie Costin	Ireland	1:26:05	
20	Sérgio Vieira	Portugal	1:27:07	
21	Ivan Losyev	Ukraine	1:27:12	
22	Arnis Rumbenieks	Latvia	1:30:50	SB
	Máté Helebrandt	Hungary	DNF	
	Ivano Brugnetti	Italy	DNF	
	Ato Ibáñez	Sweden	DQ	
	Dzianis Simanovich	Belarus	DQ	
