= 2010 European Athletics Championships – Women's 5000 metres =

Women's 5000 metres at the European Athletics Championships

The women's 5000 metres at the 2010 European Athletics Championships was held at the Estadi Olímpic Lluís Companys on 1 August.

== Medalists ==
| Gold | Elvan Abeylegesse; Turkey (TUR) |
| Silver | Sara Moreira; Portugal (POR) |
| Bronze | Jéssica Augusto; Portugal (POR) |

== Records ==
Standing records prior to the 2010 European Athletics Championships
| World record | Tirunesh Dibaba (ETH) | 14:11.15 | Oslo, Norway | 6 June 2008 |
| European record | Liliya Shobukhova (RUS) | 14:23.75 | Kazan, Russia | 19 July 2008 |
| Championship record | Marta Domínguez (ESP) | 14:56.18 | Gothenburg, Sweden | 12 August 2006 |
| World Leading | Vivian Cheruiyot (KEN) | 14:27.41 | Saint-Denis, France | 16 July 2010 |
| European Leading | Elvan Abeylegesse (TUR) | 14:31.52 | Saint-Denis, France | 16 July 2010 |
Broken records during the 2010 European Athletics Championships
| Championship record | Elvan Abeylegesse (TUR) | 14:54.44 | Barcelona, Spain | 1 August 2010 |

== Schedule ==
| Date | Time | Round |
|---|---|---|
| 1 August 2010 | 20:40 | Final |

== Results ==
=== Final ===
| Rank | Name | Nationality | Time | Notes |
|---|---|---|---|---|
| DQ | Alemitu Bekele | Turkey | ~~14:52.20~~ | Doping |
| 1st place, gold medalist(s) | Elvan Abeylegesse | Turkey | 14:54.44 | CR |
| 2nd place, silver medalist(s) | Sara Moreira | Portugal | 14:54.71 | PB |
| 3rd place, bronze medalist(s) | Jéssica Augusto | Portugal | 14:58.47 | |
| DQ | Mariya Konovalova | Russia | ~~15:08.84~~ | Doping |
| 4 | Elena Romagnolo | Italy | 15:14.40 | SB |
| DQ | Meryem Erdoğan | Turkey | ~~15:14.92~~ | Doping |
| DQ | Yelizaveta Grechishnikova | Russia | ~~15:16.19~~ | Doping |
| 5 | Sabine Fischer | Switzerland | 15:19.80 | PB |
| 6 | Anikó Kálovics | Hungary | 15:29.44 | SB |
| 7 | Olga Golovkina | Russia | 15:31.11 | |
| 8 | Judith Plá | Spain | 15:35.01 | |
| 9 | Karoline Bjerkeli Grøvdal | Norway | 15:41.42 | |
| 10 | Krisztina Papp | Hungary | 15:52.83 | |
| 11 | Ragnhild Kvarberg | Norway | 15:59.80 | |
| 12 | Gema Barrachina | Spain | 16:00.51 | |
| 13 | Roxana Bârca | Romania | 16:06.10 | |
| | Lidia Chojecka | Poland | DNF | |
| | Volha Krautsova | Belarus | DNF | |
