= Meryem Erdoğan =

Ethiopian-born Turkish long-distance runner (born 1990)

Personal information
- Nationality: Turkish
- Born: 24 April 1990 (age 36) Ethiopia

Sport
- Sport: Running
- Events: Distance running (5000 m, 10000 m)
- Club: Kocaeli BB Kağıtspor

Achievements and titles
- Personal bests: 1500 m: 4:16.87; 5000 m: 15:14.92; 10000 m: 31:44.86; 15 km: 0:50:12; Half-marathon: 1:11:24

Meryem Erdoğan (formerly Mariam Tanga or Mariam Hana Dingo, born 24 April 1990) is an Ethiopian-born Turkish long-distance runner.

In 2012 Erdoğan was banned for two years after doping.

== Personal life ==
She was born on 24 April 1990, in Ethiopia. Impressed by her countrywoman Elvan Abeylegesse, who became a renowned athlete after acquiring Turkish citizenship, she decided to go to Turkey in order to become an athlete there. In 2006, at age of 16, she illegally immigrated to Turkey via Beirut, Lebanon. She was caught by police in Istanbul, however barely escaped deportation. Following adventurous times, she was acknowledged as a talented athlete candidate by Ertan Hatipoğlu, the former coach of Abeylegesse. Her application for Turkish citizenship was accepted in January 2010. She took the Turkish name Meryem and chose as surname Erdoğan for her admiration of the Turkish prime minister Recep Tayyip Erdoğan.

== Sports career ==
Rejected initially by the clubs Enkaspor and Fenerbahçe Athletics due to her illegal status, Meryem Erdoğan was admitted to Kasımpaşaspor in Istanbul and finally entered Kocaeli Büyükşehir Belediyesi Kağıt Spor Kulübü in İzmit, where she is being coached by Öznur Dursun, a former national female athlete.

She participated at various international long-distance runs held in Turkey under her Ethiopian identification as Mariam Tanga or Mariam Hana Dingo. In 2009, she placed second at the half marathon in Trabzon and fourth in the 15 km run at the 31st Eurasia Marathon in Istanbul. In March of the same year, she won the 10 km road run of the 4th International Runtalya Marathon in Antalya with a time of 33:09.

Her international debut following her acquirement of a Turkish passport was at the Papaflessia international meeting held in Kalamata, Greece on 29 May 2010, where she won the 1500 m event in 4:16.92. At her next international participation, the 14th European Cup 10000m held on 5 June 2010, in Marseille, France, she placed fourth in a personal best time of 31:55.53.

On 28 July 2010, Erdoğan finished fifth in the 10000 m final at the European Championships in Barcelona, Spain, clocking a new personal best of 31:44.86. Four days later, on 1 August 2010, she finished seventh in the 5000 m final, in another personal best time of 15:14.92. She became the women's under-23 champion at the 2010 European Cross Country Championships, winning by a margin of nine seconds.

In 2012 Erdoğan was banned for two years after doping.

== Performance progression ==
Distance	Season	Time	Location	Date
1500 m	2009	4:15.62	Istanbul, TUR	13 June 2009
5000 m	2010	15:14.92	Barcelona, ESP	1 August 2010
10000 m	2010	31:44.86	Barcelona, ESP	28 July 2010
10 km	2009	33:09	Antalya, TUR	15 March 2009
15 km	2010	50:12	Istanbul, TUR	17 October 2010
15 km	2009	51:22	Istanbul, TUR	18 October 2009
Half marathon	2009	1:11:24	Trabzon, TUR	22 February 2009
