= Aleksandr Orlov (runner) =

Russian long-distance runner

Aleksandr Valeryevich Orlov (Russian: Александр Валерьевич Орлов; born February 21, 1981) is a Russian long-distance runner.

== International competitions ==
Year	Competition	Venue	Position	Event	Notes
Representing Russia
2010	European Championships	Barcelona, Spain	11th	5000 m	13:58.69
