= Yelena Sokolova (runner) =

Russian long-distance runner

Yelena Vladimirovna Sokolova (Russian: Елена Владимировна Соколова; born 27 December 1979) is a Russian long-distance runner.

She ran at the 2010 Frankfurt Marathon and set a personal best time of 2:28:01 for eighth place.

== International competitions ==
Year	Competition	Venue	Position	Event	Notes
Representing Russia
2010	European Championships	Barcelona, Spain	5th	10,000 m	32:36.71
