= 2010 European Athletics Championships – Women's 10,000 metres =

Women's 10,000 metres at the European Athletics Championships

The women's 10,000 metres at the 2010 European Athletics Championships was held at the Estadi Olímpic Lluís Companys on 28 July.

== Medalists ==
Gold	Elvan Abeylegesse; Turkey (TUR)
Silver	Jéssica Augusto; Portugal (POR)
Bronze	Hilda Kibet; Netherlands (NED)

== Records ==
Standing records prior to the 2010 European Athletics Championships
World record	Wang Junxia (CHN)	29:31.78	Beijing, China	8 September 1993
European record	Elvan Abeylegesse (TUR)	29:56.34	Beijing, China	15 August 2008
Championship record	Paula Radcliffe (GBR)	30:01.09	Munich, Germany	8 August 2002
World Leading	Meselech Melkamu (ETH)	31:04.52	Ostrava, Czech Republic	27 May 2010
European Leading	Inês Monteiro (POR)	31:13.58	Marseille, France	5 June 2010
Broken records during the 2010 European Athletics Championships
European Leading	Elvan Abeylegesse (TUR)	31:10.23	Barcelona, Spain	28 July 2010

== Schedule ==
Date	Time	Round
28 July 2010	21:05	Final

== Results ==
=== Final ===
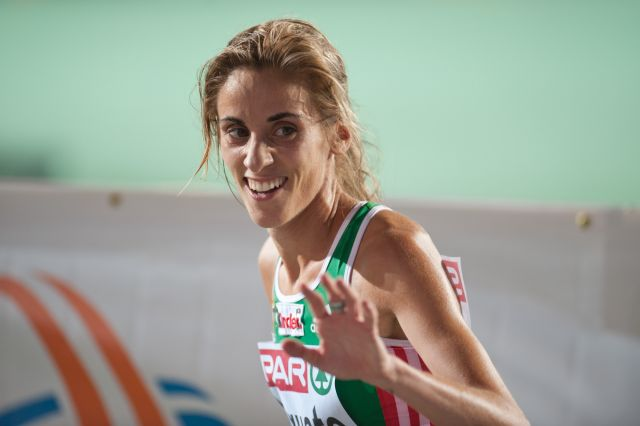
Jéssica Augusto took the silver medal in the race

Rank	Athlete	Nationality	Time	Notes
1st place, gold medalist(s)	Elvan Abeylegesse	Turkey	31:10.23	EL
DQ	Inga Abitova	Russia	~~31:22.83~~	Doping
2nd place, silver medalist(s)	Jéssica Augusto	Portugal	31:25.77	
3rd place, bronze medalist(s)	Hilda Kibet	Netherlands	31:36.90	SB
DQ	Meryem Erdoğan	Turkey	~~31:44.86~~	Doping
4	Sabrina Mockenhaupt	Germany	32:06.02	
5	Yelena Sokolova	Russia	32:36.71	
6	Krisztina Papp	Hungary	32:49.05	
7	Dulce Félix	Portugal	33:12.93	
8	Sviatlana Kudzelich	Belarus	33:31.33	
9	Martina Strähl	Switzerland	33:37.89	
10	Jacqueline Martín	Spain	34:11.49	
11	Zsófia Erdélyi	Hungary	34:57.77	
	Federica Dal Ri	Italy	DNF	
	Karoline Bjerkeli Grøvdal	Norway	DNF	
	Maria Sig Møller	Denmark	DNF	
	Sara Moreira	Portugal	DNF	
	Liliya Shobukhova	Russia	DNF	Doping
