= 2010 European Athletics Championships – Women's 100 metres hurdles =

Women's 100 metres hurdles at the European Athletics Championships

The women's 100 metres hurdles at the 2010 European Athletics Championships was held at the Estadi Olímpic Lluís Companys on 30 and 31 July.

== Medalists ==
Gold	Nevin Yanıt; Turkey (TUR)
Silver	(Republic of Ireland) Derval O'Rourke; Ireland (IRL)
Bronze	Carolin Nytra; Germany (GER)

== Records ==
Standing records prior to the 2010 European Athletics Championships
World record	Yordanka Donkova (BUL)	12.21	Stara Zagora, Bulgaria	20 August 1988
European record	Yordanka Donkova (BUL)	12.21	Stara Zagora, Bulgaria	20 August 1988
Championship record	Yordanka Donkova (BUL)	12.38	Stuttgart, West Germany	29 August 1986
World Leading	LoLo Jones (USA)	12.55	New York City, United States	12 June 2010
European Leading	Carolin Nytra (GER)	12.57	Lausanne, Switzerland	8 July 2010

== Schedule ==
Date	Time	Round
30 July 2010	10:00	Round 1
31 July 2010	19:05	Semifinals
31 July 2010	20:25	Final

== Results ==
=== Round 1 ===
First 3 in each heat and 4 best performers advance to the Semifinals.

==== Heat 1 ====
Rank	Lane	Name	Nationality	React	Time	Notes
1	3	Nevin Yanıt	Turkey	0.180	12.89	Q
2	8	Alina Talay	Belarus	0.203	13.17	Q
3	7	Nadine Hildebrand	Germany	0.223	13.25	Q
4	2	Anne Zagré	Belgium	0.161	13.31	
5	6	Irina Lenskiy	Israel	0.261	13.41	
6	4	Marzia Caravelli	Italy	0.169	13.50	
7	5	Jelena Jotanović	Serbia	0.202	13.77	
				Wind: −0.8 m/s		

==== Heat 2 ====
Rank	Lane	Name	Nationality	React	Time	Notes
1	2	Yevheniya Snihur	Ukraine	0.171	12.90	Q
2	6	Lisa Urech	Switzerland	0.175	13.03	Q
3	3	Joanna Kocielnik	Poland	0.206	13.25	Q
4	5	Eline Berings	Belgium	0.175	13.27	
5	4	Marina Tomić	Slovenia	0.167	13.28	
6	7	Miriam Cupáková	Slovakia	0.225	13.35	
7	8	Dimitra Arachoviti	Cyprus	0.196	13.61	
				Wind: −0.1 m/s		

==== Heat 3 ====
Rank	Lane	Name	Nationality	React	Time	Notes
1	7	Derval O'Rourke	Ireland	0.169	12.88	Q, SB
2	3	Carolin Nytra	Germany	0.189	12.89	Q
3	4	Olga Samylova	Russia	0.168	13.06	Q, PB
4	2	Lucie Škrobáková	Czech Republic	0.201	13.15	q
5	8	Victoria Schreibeis	Austria	0.188	13.23	q
6	5	Ana Torrijos	Spain	0.191	13.33	PB
7	6	Clélia Reuse	Switzerland	0.180	13.73	
				Wind: −0.6 m/s		

==== Heat 4 ====
Rank	Lane	Name	Nationality	React	Time	Notes
1	3	Christina Vukicevic	Norway	0.163	12.83	Q, SB
2	4	Tatyana Dektyareva	Russia	0.194	12.86	Q
3	2	Elisabeth Davin	Belgium	0.178	13.12	Q, SB
4	6	Katsiaryna Paplauskaya	Belarus	0.180	13.19	q
4	8	Cindy Roleder	Germany	0.215	13.19	q
6	7	Sonata Tamošaitytė	Lithuania	0.207	13.31	
—N/a	5	Beate Schrott	Austria			DSQ
				Wind: +0.4 m/s		

==== Summary ====
Rank	Heat	Lane	Name	Nationality	React	Time	Notes
1	4	3	Christina Vukicevic	Norway	0.163	12.83	Q, SB
2	4	4	Tatyana Dektyareva	Russia	0.194	12.86	Q
3	3	7	Derval O'Rourke	Ireland	0.169	12.88	Q, SB
4	3	3	Carolin Nytra	Germany	0.189	12.89	Q
4	1	3	Nevin Yanıt	Turkey	0.180	12.89	Q
6	2	2	Yevheniya Snihur	Ukraine	0.171	12.90	Q
7	2	6	Lisa Urech	Switzerland	0.175	13.03	Q
8	3	4	Olga Samylova	Russia	0.168	13.06	Q, PB
9	4	2	Elisabeth Davin	Belgium	0.178	13.12	Q, SB
10	3	2	Lucie Škrobáková	Czech Republic	0.201	13.15	q
11	1	8	Alina Talay	Belarus	0.203	13.17	Q
12	4	8	Cindy Roleder	Germany	0.215	13.19	q
13	4	6	Katsiaryna Paplauskaya	Belarus	0.180	13.19	q
14	3	8	Victoria Schreibeis	Austria	0.188	13.23	q
15	1	7	Nadine Hildebrand	Germany	0.223	13.25	Q
15	2	3	Joanna Kocielnik	Poland	0.206	13.25	Q
17	2	5	Eline Berings	Belgium	0.175	13.27	
18	2	4	Marina Tomić	Slovenia	0.167	13.28	
19	4	7	Sonata Tamošaitytė	Lithuania	0.207	13.31	
19	1	2	Anne Zagré	Belgium	0.161	13.31	
21	3	5	Ana Torrijos	Spain	0.191	13.33	PB
22	2	7	Miriam Cupáková	Slovakia	0.225	13.35	
23	1	6	Irina Lenskiy	Israel	0.261	13.41	
24	1	4	Marzia Caravelli	Italy	0.169	13.50	
25	2	8	Dimitra Arachoviti	Cyprus	0.196	13.61	
26	3	6	Clélia Reuse	Switzerland	0.180	13.73	
27	1	5	Jelena Jotanović	Serbia	0.202	13.77	
—N/a	4	5	Beate Schrott	Austria			DSQ

=== Semifinals ===
First 3 in each heat and 2 best performers advance to the Final.

==== Semifinal 1 ====
Rank	Lane	Name	Nationality	React	Time	Notes
1	4	Nevin Yanıt	Turkey	0.179	12.71	Q, NR
2	5	Carolin Nytra	Germany	0.184	12.75	Q
3	6	Derval O'Rourke	Ireland	0.176	12.75	Q, SB
4	3	Lisa Urech	Switzerland	0.171	12.95	q
5	7	Joanna Kocielnik	Poland	0.160	13.06	
6	8	Olga Samylova	Russia	0.187	13.08	
7	1	Katsiaryna Paplauskaya	Belarus	0.179	13.14	SB
—N/a	2	Cindy Roleder	Germany	0.188		DSQ
				Wind: −0.4 m/s		

==== Semifinal 2 ====
Rank	Lane	Name	Nationality	React	Time	Notes
1	3	Tatyana Dektyareva	Russia	0.209	12.81	Q
2	4	Christina Vukicevic	Norway	0.173	12.85	Q
3	6	Yevheniya Snihur	Ukraine	0.167	12.88	Q
4	8	Nadine Hildebrand	Germany	0.185	12.96	q, PB
5	2	Lucie Škrobáková	Czech Republic	0.163	13.10	
6	7	Elisabeth Davin	Belgium	0.161	13.15	
7	1	Victoria Schreibeis	Austria	0.206	13.41	
—N/a	5	Alina Talay	Belarus	0.202		DSQ
				Wind: −1.9 m/s		

==== Summary ====
Rank	Heat	Lane	Name	Nationality	React	Time	Notes
1	1	4	Nevin Yanıt	Turkey	0.179	12.71	Q, NR
2	1	5	Carolin Nytra	Germany	0.184	12.75	Q
3	1	6	Derval O'Rourke	Ireland	0.176	12.75	Q, SB
4	2	3	Tatyana Dektyareva	Russia	0.209	12.81	Q
5	2	4	Christina Vukicevic	Norway	0.173	12.85	Q
6	2	6	Yevheniya Snihur	Ukraine	0.167	12.88	Q
7	1	3	Lisa Urech	Switzerland	0.171	12.95	q
8	2	8	Nadine Hildebrand	Germany	0.185	12.96	q, PB
9	1	7	Joanna Kocielnik	Poland	0.160	13.06	
10	1	8	Olga Samylova	Russia	0.187	13.08	
11	2	2	Lucie Škrobáková	Czech Republic	0.163	13.10	
12	1	1	Katsiaryna Paplauskaya	Belarus	0.179	13.14	SB
13	2	7	Elisabeth Davin	Belgium	0.161	13.15	
14	2	1	Victoria Schreibeis	Austria	0.206	13.41	
—N/a	2	5	Alina Talay	Belarus	0.202		DSQ
—N/a	1	2	Cindy Roleder	Germany	0.188		DSQ

=== Final ===
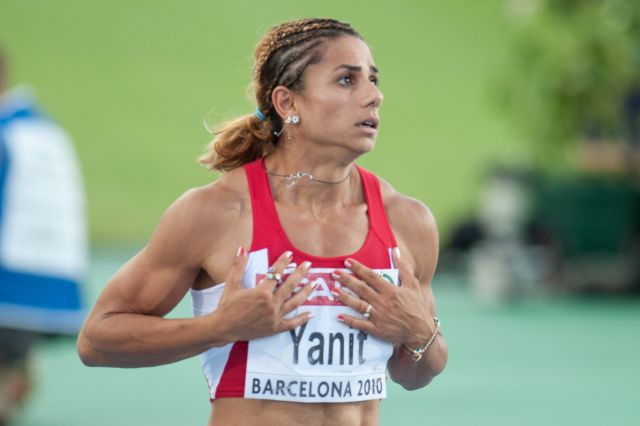
Yanıt broke the Turkish record en route to her victory.

Rank	Lane	Name	Nationality	React	Time	Notes
1st place, gold medalist(s)	3	Nevin Yanıt	Turkey	0.184	12.63	NR
2nd place, silver medalist(s)	7	Derval O'Rourke	Ireland	0.172	12.65	NR
3rd place, bronze medalist(s)	6	Carolin Nytra	Germany	0.177	12.68	
4	5	Christina Vukicevic	Norway	0.157	12.78	SB
5	8	Yevheniya Snihur	Ukraine	0.151	12.92	
6	4	Tatyana Dektyareva	Russia	0.185	12.98	
7	2	Lisa Urech	Switzerland	0.170	13.02	
8	1	Nadine Hildebrand	Germany	0.191	13.08	
