= Tatyana Firova =

Russian sprint athlete (born 1982)

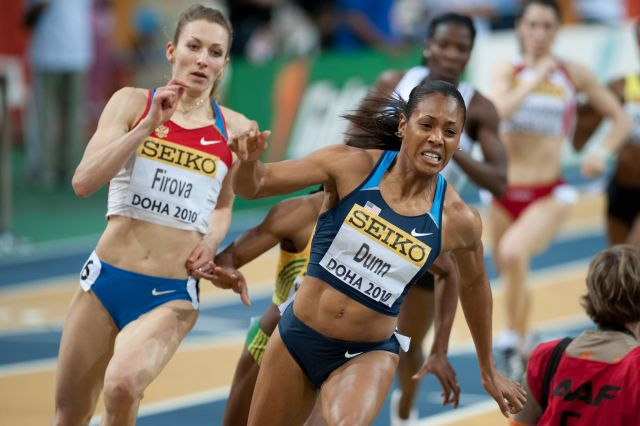
- Firova behind Debbie Dunn during the 2010 World Indoor Championships

Personal information
- Born: October 10, 1982 (age 43) Sarov, Russian SFSR, Soviet Union
- Height: 1.74 m (5 ft 8 1/2 in)
- Weight: 59 kg (130 lb)

Sport
- Country: Russia
- Sport: Athletics
- Event: 4 × 400 m relay
Medal record
Olympic Games
Silver medal – second place	2004 Athens	4 × 400 m relay
Disqualified	2008 Beijing	4 × 400 m relay
Disqualified	2012 London	4 × 400 m relay
World Championships
Gold medal – first place	2005 Helsinki	4 × 400 m relay
Disqualified	2013 Moscow	4 × 400 m relay
Disqualified	2009 Berlin	4 × 400 m relay
European Championships
Disqualified	2010 Barcelona	400 m
Gold medal – first place	2010 Barcelona	4 × 400 m relay
World Indoor Championships
Disqualified	2010 Doha	400 m
Disqualified	2010 Doha	4 × 400 m relay
Continental Cup
Disqualified	2010 Split	4 × 400 m relay
Disqualified	2010 Split	400 m

Tatyana Pavlovna Firova (Russian: Татьяна Павловна Фирова; born October 10, 1982) is a Russian former sprint athlete. She was awarded the silver medal in the 4 × 400 m relay at the 2004 Summer Olympics.

In 2016, it was announced that a reanalysis of samples from the 2008 Summer Olympics resulted in a doping violation by Firova. She was disqualified from the competition, and she and her teammates were stripped of their 4 × 400 m relay silver medals. She claimed that using banned substances was necessary for achieving good results: "A normal person can take banned substances if they want to. So why can't athletes take them as well? How else can we achieve high results?" Although offending athletes are required to return their stripped medals to the IOC, Firova refused to return her medals.

In February 2019, the Court of Arbitration for Sport handed her a four-year ban for doping, starting from 9 June 2016, and all of her results from 20 August 2008 to 31 December 2012 were disqualified.
