= Jéssica Augusto =

Portuguese runner (born 1981)

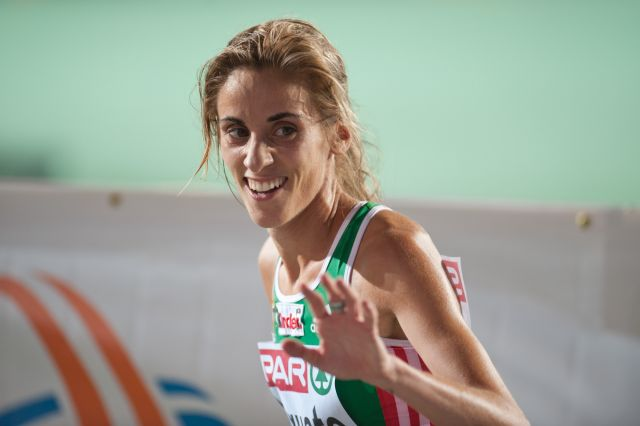
- Augusto after winning bronze at the 2010 European Championship

Personal information
- Nationality: Portugal
- Born: 8 November 1981 (age 44) Paris, France
- Height: 1.64 m (5 ft 4 1/2 in)
- Weight: 44 kg (97 lb)

Sport
- Country: Portugal
- Sport: Athletics
Medal record
Women's athletics
Representing Portugal
European Championships
Silver medal – second place	2010 Barcelona	10,000 m
Bronze medal – third place	2010 Barcelona	5,000 m
Bronze medal – third place	2014 Zürich	Marathon
Bronze medal – third place	2016 Amsterdam	Half marathon
Universiade
Gold medal – first place	2007 Bangkok	5000 m
European Cross Country Championships
Gold medal – first place	2008 Brussels	Team
Gold medal – first place	2009 Dublin	Team
Gold medal – first place	2010 Albufeira	Team
Gold medal – first place	2010 Albufeira	Individual
Silver medal – second place	2008 Brussels	Individual

Jéssica de Barros Augusto, ComM (born 8 November 1981) is a Portuguese runner who competes in cross country, road running and in middle-distance and long-distance track events. At club level, she represents Sporting CP.

Augusto has enjoyed much success at the European Cross Country Championships. She won the event in 2010, was the runner-up in 2008, and shared in the team gold on three occasions. She was the first European-born runner to finish at the 2010 IAAF World Cross Country Championships, although she was 21st overall. She has represented Portugal in three World Championships in Athletics and at the 2008 Beijing Olympics and the 2012 London Olympics.

She has won medals on the track at minor championships, including golds at the 2007 Summer Universiade and 2009 Lusophony Games. In road running, her greatest achievement is a win at the 2009 Great North Run, where she set a half marathon best of 1:09:08. She has also won at the Cursa Bombers, and finished second at both the São Silvestre de Lisboa and Great South Run.

== Career ==
Starting out in cross country running, she took gold in the junior race at the 2000 European Cross Country Championships. Her first appearance on the world stage on the track came in the 5000 metres at the 2005 World Championships, but she finished last in her heat. She enjoyed success at the Ibero American Championships however, taking gold in the 3000 m in 2004 and 2006. She led the Portuguese women to the team gold at the 2006 European Cross Country Championships. Competing at the Athletics at the 2007 Summer Universiade, Augusto set Universiade record on the way to winning the 5000 metres.

She was the 2008 Portuguese cross country champion and went on to take the silver medal at the 2008 European Cross Country Championships. She began to apply herself to the steeplechase and set the Portuguese record in 2008. She competed in two disciplines at the 2008 Beijing Olympics (5000 m and steeplechase) but failed to reach the final of either event.

In the following season, a fourth-place finish at the 2009 European Cross Country Championships meant she missed out on an individual medal, although she again headed Portugal to the women's team gold. She became the 1500 m champion of the 2009 Lusophony Games in July. Competing at the 2009 World Championships in Athletics, she reached the final of the 3000 metres steeplechase and finished 11th overall. When years later, in 2015, Spanish athlete Marta Domínguez was banned for three years by the Court of Arbitration for Sport because of her ties to doping as well as issues with her biological passport and as a result, saw all her results from 5 August 2009 until 8 July 2013 being nullified, Augusto's 11th place turned into a 10th overall. Augusto won the Great North Run in 2009, recording a time of 1:09:08 for the half marathon race. She fended off compatriots Inês Monteiro and Anália Rosa to win the 2009 Oeiras International Cross Country meeting.

She ran in the 3000 m at the 2010 IAAF World Indoor Championships and she finished in eighth place in the final. She was 21st at the 2010 IAAF World Cross Country Championships, but despite this she was the first European-born runner to cross the line. After a win at the Cursa Bombers in a 10 km personal best of 32:08, she stated that she was looking to attempt longer distance races, including the 10,000 metres on the track. She improved her 10K best further to 31:47 minutes with a runner-up performance at the Great Manchester Run. At the 2010 Ibero-American Championships, she won the bronze medal in the 1500 m but she was dissatisfied with the performance, despite running a personal best of 4:08.32. Augusto entered the 3000 m where she promptly ran a championship record of 8:46.59, the fastest run by a European at that point in the year. She ran a Portuguese record of 9:18:54 in the 3000 m steeplechase later that month, finishing behind Marta Domínguez at the Gran Premio de Andalucía.

She recorded a personal best in the 5000 metres at the Meeting Areva Diamond League competition, knocking over 20 seconds off her previous time with a run of 14:37.07 for fifth place. At the 2010 European Athletics Championships she was some distance behind Elvan Abeylegesse in the 10,000 m, who completed a solo run to victory, but she was still the clear bronze medallist – her first podium finish on the track at continental level. She represented Europe over 5000 m at the 2010 IAAF Continental Cup but only managed seventh place. Her end of year focus was the 2010 European Cross Country Championships held on home soil in Albufeira. She led the race from virtually start to finish and openly celebrated to the home crowd in the final straight, such was the size of her lead. Her win also brought the Portuguese women the team gold for the third year running. She ended the year with a win at the San Silvestre Vallecana 10K race in Madrid, where she again completed a gun-to-tape victory.

She took on Anna Incerti at the Roma-Ostia Half Marathon in February 2011, but was beaten by the Italian's pace and had to settle for second. She made her debut over the marathon distance in April at the 2011 London Marathon and she recorded a time of 2:24:33 hours for eighth position. She was second behind her fellow Portuguese and friend Ana Dulce Félix at the Austrian Women's Run after beginning the race with an excessive pace. She came tenth in the 10,000 m at the 2011 World Championships in Athletics. On the roads, she was runner-up at the Great North Run, won the Ovar Half Marathon, but failed to finish at the 2011 New York City Marathon.

In her second marathon finish she gave a similar performance at the 2012 London Marathon, taking eighth in just under two hours and 25 minutes. Augusto represented Portugal at the London 2012 Olympic marathon and placed seventh, first among the Portuguese. Her only international appearance of 2013 came at the European Team Championships, where she was fifth in the 3000 m. She was in the top ten at the Great North Run and Portugal Half Marathon, but reached the podium at the Yokohama Women's Marathon, coming third.

Despite the fact that she is currently a mother, she plans to participate in 2016 Rio Olympic Games.

== Achievements ==
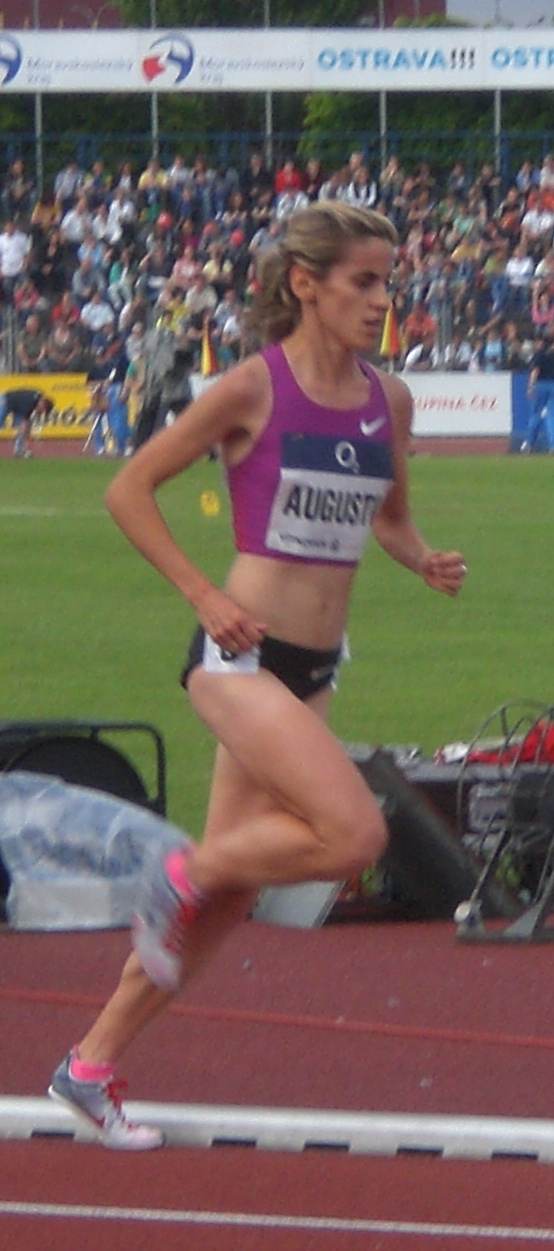
Jéssica Augusto at the 2010 Golden Spike Ostrava

Year	Competition	Venue	Position	Event	Notes
Representing Portugal
1999	European Cross Country Championships	Velenje, Slovenia	8th	Junior race	13:11
1999	European Cross Country Championships	Velenje, Slovenia	2nd	Team	32 pts
2000	World Junior Championships	Santiago, Chile	11th (h)	1500m	4:24.15
2000	World Junior Championships	Santiago, Chile	8th	3000m	9:33.37
2001	European U23 Championships	Amsterdam, Netherlands	10th	1500m	4:17.71
2003	European U23 Championships	Bydgoszcz, Poland	—	5000m	DNF
2004	Ibero-American Championships	Huelva, Spain	1st	3000 m	9:02.36
2006	Ibero-American Championships	Ponce, Puerto Rico	1st	3000 m	9:06.74
2007	World Cross Country Championships	Mombasa, Kenya	12th	Senior race (8 km)	28:21
2007	Universiade	Bangkok, Thailand	1st	5000 m	15:28.78 CR
2007	World Championships	Osaka, Japan	15th	5000 m	15:24.93
2007	World Athletics Final	Stuttgart, Germany	6th	3000 m	8:56.65
2008	World Indoor Championships	Valencia, Spain	8th	3000 m	8:49.78
2008	Olympics	Beijing, China	26th (h)	5000 m	16:05.71
2008	Olympics	Beijing, China	20th (h)	3000 m st.	9:30.23
2008	European Cross Country Championships	Brussels, Belgium	2nd	Individual (8 km)	27:54
2008	European Cross Country Championships	Brussels, Belgium	1st	Team	29 pts
2009	Lusophony Games	Lisbon, Portugal	1st	1500 m	4:15.86
2009	World Championships	Berlin, Germany	11th	3000 m st.	9:25.25
2009	European Cross Country Championships	Dublin, Ireland	4th	Senior race (8.018 km)	28:11
2009	European Cross Country Championships	Dublin, Ireland	1st	Team	25 pts
2010	World Indoor Championships	Doha, Qatar	8th	3000 m	9:01.71
2010	World Cross Country Championships	Bydgoszcz, Poland	21st	Senior race (7.759 km)	26:02
2010	World Cross Country Championships	Bydgoszcz, Poland	5th	Team	127 pts
2010	Ibero-American Championships	San Fernando, Spain	3rd	1500 m	4:08.32
2010	Ibero-American Championships	San Fernando, Spain	1st	3000 m	8:46.59
2010	European Championships	Barcelona, Spain	2nd	10,000 m	31:25.77
2010	European Championships	Barcelona, Spain	3rd	5000 m	14:58.47
2010	European Cross Country Championships	Albufeira, Portugal	1st	Senior race (8.17 km)	26:52
2011	London Marathon	London, United Kingdom	8th	Marathon	2:24:33
2011	World Championships	Daegu, South Korea	10th	10,000 m	32:06.68
2012	Olympics	London, United Kingdom	7th	Marathon	2:25:11
2014	European Athletics Championships	Zürich, Switzerland	3rd	Marathon	2:25:41
2016	London Marathon	London, United Kingdom	10th	Marathon	2:28:53
2016	European Athletics Championships	Amsterdam, Netherlands	3rd	Half marathon	1:10:55

=== Personal bests ===
- 800 metres – 2:10.59 min (2001), indoor – 2:05.97 min (2002)
- 1000 metres – 2:47.5 min (2001)
- 1500 metres – 4:08.23 min (2010), indoor – 4:07.89 min (2009)
- Mile run – 4:45.15 min (1999), indoor – 4:32.18 min (2009)
- 3000 metres – 8:41.35 min (2007)
- 3000 metres steeplechase – 9:18:45 min NR (2010)
- 5000 metres – 14:37.18 min (2010)
- 10,000 metres – 31:15.78 min (2010)
- Half marathon – 1:09:58 hrs (2011)
- Marathon – 2:24:37 hrs (2014)

Awards
Preceded by Telma Monteiro	Portuguese Sportswoman of the Year; 2012	Succeeded by Sara Moreira
