= Belarus at the 2010 European Athletics Championships =

Sporting event delegation

Belarus will be represented by 42 athletes at the 2010 European Athletics Championships held in Barcelona, Spain.

== Participants ==
=== Men ===
==== Track and road events ====
| Athlete | Events | Heat | | Semifinal | | Final | |
| Athlete | Events | Result | Rank | Result | Rank | Result | Rank |
|---|---|---|---|---|---|---|---|
| Anis Ananenka | 800 m | 1:49.29 | 4 q | 1:48.41 | 9 | Did not advance | |
| Stsiapan Rahautsou | 10000 m | | | | | 29:40.19 | 16 |
| Maksim Lynsha | 110 m hurdles | 13.65 (SB) | 10 q | 13.68 | 9 | Did not advance | |
| Denis Simanovič | 20 km walk | | | | | Disqualified | |

==== Field events ====
| Event | Athletes | Qualification | | Final | |
| Event | Athletes | Result | Rank | Result | Rank |
|---|---|---|---|---|---|
| Triple jump | Sergiy Ivanov | 16.66 | 16 | Did not advance | |
| Triple jump | Dzmitry Platnitski | 15.95 | 23 | Did not advance | |
| Shot put | Andrei Mikhnevich^{1} | Disqualified | | | |
| Shot put | Pavel Lyzhyn | 20.42 | 1 Q | 20.11 | 7 |
| Discus throw | Dmitrij Cyvakov | 58.53 | 26 | Did not advance | |
| Hammer throw | Pavel Kryvitski | 72.68 | 16 | Did not advance | |
| Hammer throw | Yury Shayunou | 71.10 | 20 | Did not advance | |
| Hammer throw | Valeri Sviatokha | 74.66 | 7 q | 78.20 | 4 |
| Javelin throw | Vladimir Kozlov | 76.29 | 14 | Did not advance | |

^{1} Mikhnevich originally won the gold medal in 21.01 m in the final and 20.35 (4 Q) in qualification) but were disqualified in 2013 (his results from 2005 World Championships was canceled).

==== Combined events ====
| Decathlon | Event | Andrei Krauchanka | | | Eduard Mikhan | | |
| Decathlon | Event | Results | Points | Rank | Results | Points | Rank |
|---|---|---|---|---|---|---|---|
| | 100 m | 11.26 | 804 | 22 | 10.84 (SB) | 897 | 5 |
| | Long jump | 7.76 (SB) | 1000 | 2 | 7.47 (SB) | 927 | 8 |
| | Shot put | 14.32 | 748 | 11 | 13.34 | 688 | 24 |
| | High jump | 2.10 (SB) | 896 | 1 | 1.92 | 731 | 17 |
| | 400 m | 49.01 | 861 | 8 | 48.09 (PB) | 905 | 3 |
| | 110 m hurdles | 14.21 | 948 | 2 | 14.37 (PB) | 927 | 7 |
| | Discus throw | 45.48 (SB) | 777 | 6 | 45.04 | 768 | 8 |
| | Pole vault | 5.05 (SB) | 926 | 5 | 4.65 (PB) | 804 | 15 |
| | Javelin throw | 58.05 | 709 | 12 | 53.39 (SB) | 639 | 17 |
| | 1500 m | 4:36.66 (SB) | 701 | 9 | 4:34.90 | 713 | 7 |
| Final | | | 8370 (SB) | 3rd place, bronze medalist(s) | | 7999 (PB) | 8 |

=== Women ===
==== Track and road events ====
| Athlete | Events | Heat | | Semifinal | | Final | |
| Athlete | Events | Result | Rank | Result | Rank | Result | Rank |
|---|---|---|---|---|---|---|---|
| Yulia Nestsiarenka | 100 m | 11.58 | 18 | Did not advance | | | |
| Yuliya Balykina | 100 m | 11.55 | 16 | Did not advance | | | |
| Alena Neumiarzhitskaya | 100 m | 11.63 | 21 | Did not advance | | | |
| Alena Neumiarzhitskaya | 200 m | 23.82 | 18 | Did not advance | | | |
| Svetlana Ucovič | 800 m | 2:02.84 | 22 | | | Did not advance | |
| Natalya Koreyvo | 1500 m | 4:06.89 | 13 | | | Did not advance | |
| Volha Krautsova | 5000 m | | | | | Did not finish | |
| Svetlana Kudelič | 10,000 m | | | | | 33:31.33 | 10 |
| Jekaterina Polavskaya | 100 m hurdles | 13.19 | 13 q | 13.14 (SB) | 12 | Did not advance | |
| Alina Talay | 100 m hurdles | 13.17 | 11 Q | Disqualified | | Did not advance | |
| Alina Matvejuk | 20 km walk | | | | | Did not finish | |
| Nastassia Yatsevič | 20 km walk | | | | | 1:36:59 | 14 |
| Yuliya Balyikina; Yulia Nestsiarenka; Alena Neumiarzhytskaya; Katsiaryna Shumak | 4x100 m relay | 43.69 | 5 Q | | | 43.18 | 5 |
| Nastassia Buldakova; Alena Kievich; Katsiaryna Mishyna; Hanna Tashpulatava; Sviatlana Usovich | 4x400 m relay | 3:29.27 | 6 q | | | 3:28.74 | 7 |

==== Field events ====
| Event | Athletes | Qualification | | Final | |
| Event | Athletes | Result | Rank | Result | Rank |
|---|---|---|---|---|---|
| Pole vault | Anastacya Shvedova | 4.40 | 6 Q | 4.65 (NR) | 4 |
| Long jump | Nastassia Mironchyk | 6.66 | 9 Q | 6.75 | 6 |
| Triple jump | Kseniya Dzetsuk | 14.01 | 16 | Did not advance | |
| Triple jump | Natallia Vatkina | 14.30 | 8 Q | 13.94 | 9 |
| Shot put | Nadzeya Astapchuk | 18.44 | 4 Q | 20.48 | 1st place, gold medalist(s) |
| Shot put | Natallia Mikhnevich | 18.46 | 3 Q | 19.53 | 2nd place, silver medalist(s) |
| Shot put | Yanina Karolchyk-Pravalinskaya | 17.68 | 11 Q | 19.29 | 4 |
| Hammer throw | Darya Pchelnik | No mark | | Did not advance | |
| Hammer throw | Volha Tsander | 62.69 | 18 | Did not advance | |

==== Combined events ====
| Heptathlon | Event | Yana Maksimava | | |
| Heptathlon | Event | Results | Points | Rank |
|---|---|---|---|---|
| | 100 m | 14.40 (SB) | 923 | 21 |
| | High jump | 1.83 | 1016 | 5 |
| | Shot put | 13.10 | 734 | 16 |
| | 200 m | 26.03 | 795 | 23 |
| | Long jump | 5.61 | 732 | 21 |
| | Javelin throw | 41.29 | 692 | 16 |
| | 800 m | 2:11.29 | 946 | 4 |
| | Final | | 5838 | 18 |

== Results ==
| 2010 Barcelona | Gold | Silver | Bronze | Total |
| Belarus (BLR) | 1 | 1 | 1 | 3 |
