= Ragnhild Kvarberg =

Norwegian long-distance runner

Ragnhild Kvarberg, married Hjelle (born 23 March 1981) is a retired Norwegian middle distance and long-distance runner.

She finished sixth in 3000 metres steeplechase at the 2001 European U23 Championships and thirteenth in 5000 metres at the 2010 European Championships. In between she had a stint as a 1500 metres specialist, competing at the 2003 European U23 Championships, the 2006 European Championships and the 2007 World Championships without reaching the final. Before resurfacing as a 5000 metres runner, she also bore her first child.

Kvarberg became Norwegian 800 metres champion in 2005 and 2006, 1500 metres champion in 2001, 2004, 2005, 2006 and 2010 and cross-country champion (short course) in 2002 and 2004. She hails from Vang Municipality in Hedmark county, and has represented the regional clubs FIK Orion and FIK Ren-Eng before switching to SK Vidar. After her comeback in 2010, she had another child, married, moved to Nøtterøy Municipality and has participated in ultra running for Tønsberg FIK.

Her personal best times were 2:03.83 minutes in the 800 metres (2006); 4:07.14 minutes in the 1500 metres (2006); 9:09.59 minutes in the 3000 metres (2010), 10:15.32 minutes in the 3000 metres steeplechase (2001) and 15:46.99 minutes in the 5000 metres (2010).
