= Ireland at the 2010 European Athletics Championships =

Sporting event delegation

Ireland was represented by 33 athletes at the 2010 European Athletics Championships held in Barcelona, Spain.

== Participants ==
Event	M/W	Athlete	Performance(s)	Ranking
100m	M	Jason Smyth	10.43Q; 10.46	Semifinal
100m	M	Paul Hession	—	Scratched
100m	W	Ailis McSweeney	11.52q; 11.32	Semifinal
200m	M	Paul Hession	20.69Q; 20.67q; 20.71	6th
200m	M	Steven Colvert	21.14	Heats
200m	W	Niamh Whelan	23.78q; 23.31	Semifinal
200m	W	Joanne Cuddihy	—	Scratched
400m	M	David Gillick	45.84Q; 44.79Q (SB); 45.28	5th
400m	M	Gordon Kennedy	46.63q; 46.72	Semifinal
400m	M	Brian Gregan	46.90	Heats
800m	M	David McCarthy	1:49.53q; 1:49.14	Semifinal
800m	M	Thomas Chamney	—	Scratched
800m	W	Roseanne Galligan	2:01.76 (PB)	Heats
1500m	M	Thomas Chamney	3:43.60	Heats
1500m	M	Rory Chesser	3:44.01	Heats
1500m	M	Alistair Cragg	—	Scratched
5000m	M	Alistair Cragg	13:37.66q; DNF	Final
5000m	M	Mark Christie	14:12.68	Heats
3000m steeplechase	W	Fionnuala Britton	9:44.84q; 9:44.25	11th
3000m steeplechase	W	Stephanie Reilly	10:13.94	Heats
100m hurdles	W	Derval O'Rourke	12.88Q (SB); 12.75Q (SB); 12.65 (NR)	2nd
400m hurdles	W	Michelle Carey	57.58	Heats
400m hurdles	W	Justine Kinney	57.39	Heats
400m hurdles	W	Brona Furlong	58.13	Heats
20km walk	M	Robert Heffernan	1:21:00	3rd
20km walk	M	Jamie Costin	1:26:05	20th
20km walk	W	Olive Loughnane	DNF	
50km walk	M	Robert Heffernan	3:45:30 (NR)	4th
50km walk	M	Colin Griffin	3:57:58 (SB)	11th
High jump	W	Deirdre Ryan	1.90 (SB)	Heats
Pole vault	W	Tori Pena	4.15 (NR)	21st
Long jump	W	Kelly Proper	NM	Heats
4 × 100 m relay	W	Amy Foster; Niamh Whelan; Claire Brady; Ailis McSweeney; Derval O'Rourke (Note: Unused relay squad member.); Kelly Proper	43.93 (NR)	Heats
4 × 400 m relay	M	Gordon Kennedy; Brian Murphy; Brian Gregan; Steven Colvert; David Gillick; David McCarthy	3:07.21	Heats
4 × 400 m relay	W	Marian Andrews; Joanne Cuddihy; Brona Furlong; Michelle Carey; Marian Heffernan; Claire Bergin; Justine Kinney		Heats

== Results ==
2010 Barcelona	Gold	Silver	Bronze	Total
Ireland (IRL)	0	1	1	2
