= Anastasiya Kapachinskaya =

Russian sprinter (born 1979)

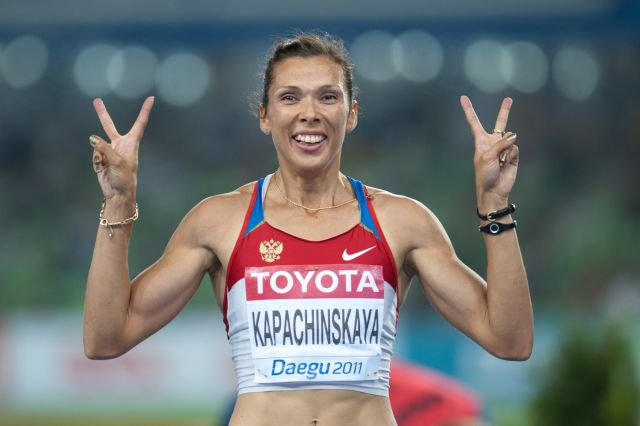
- Kapachinskaya at the 2011 World Championships

Personal information
- Born: November 21, 1979 (age 46) Moscow, Russian SFSR, Soviet Union
- Height: 1.78 m (5 ft 10 in)
- Weight: 63 kg (139 lb)

Sport
- Country: Russia
- Sport: Athletics
- Event: 4 × 400 metres relay
Medal record
Olympic Games
Disqualified	2008 Beijing	4 × 400 m relay
Disqualified	2012 London	4 × 400 m relay
World Championships
Gold medal – first place	2003 Paris	200 m
Silver medal – second place	2003 Paris	4 × 400 m relay
Bronze medal – third place	2001 Edmonton	4 × 400 m relay
Disqualified	2009 Berlin	4 × 400 m relay
Disqualified	2011 Daegu	400 m
Disqualified	2011 Daegu	4 × 400 m relay
European Championships
Disqualified	2010 Barcelona	4 × 400 m relay

Anastasiya Alexandrovna Kapachinskaya (Russian: Анастасия Александровна Капачинская; born November 20, 1979) is a Russian former sprint athlete. She was the 2003 World champion in the 200 m. She was disqualified from competitions in 2004 and 2008 due to doping offences. As a result, the bulk of her athletics performances after 2004 have been annulled.

== Career ==
Kapachinskaya won the women's 200 m at the 2003 World Championships in Athletics in Paris. The following year, she was initially awarded gold in the 200 m event at the 2004 IAAF World Indoor Championships in Budapest but was stripped of the title after testing positive for the banned anabolic steroid stanozolol. She denied all knowledge of how it had happened, and during her two-year ban she vowed to work with the World Anti-Doping Agency to promote sports without drugs.

At the 2008 Summer Olympics, Kapachinskaya reached the 400 m final, where she placed fifth. She initially won silver in the 4 × 400 m relay. In 2009, she advanced to the 400 m final at the world championships and finished 6th. The Russian team which included Kapachinskaya initially achieved a bronze in the relay.

In May 2016, it was reported that Kapachinskaya was one of 14 Russian athletes, and nine medalists, implicated in doping following the retesting of urine from the 2008 Olympics. Kapachinskaya was named by Russian press agency TASS as having failed the retest, which was undertaken following the Russian doping scandal of 2015 and 2016. If confirmed, under IOC and IAAF rules, Kapachinskaya stood to lose all results, medals and records from the date of the original test to May 2016. As this would be a second doping offence, she would also face a lifetime ban from the sport. In August 2016, Kapachinskaya and her relay teammates were officially stripped of their 2008 silver medal. Kapachinskaya had tested positive for the steroids stanozol and turinabol. On 21 June 2017 it was reported that Kapachinskaya had forfeited all results and medals from 17 August 2008 onwards.

== See also ==
- List of doping cases in athletics
