= Meliz Redif =

Turkish athletics competitor

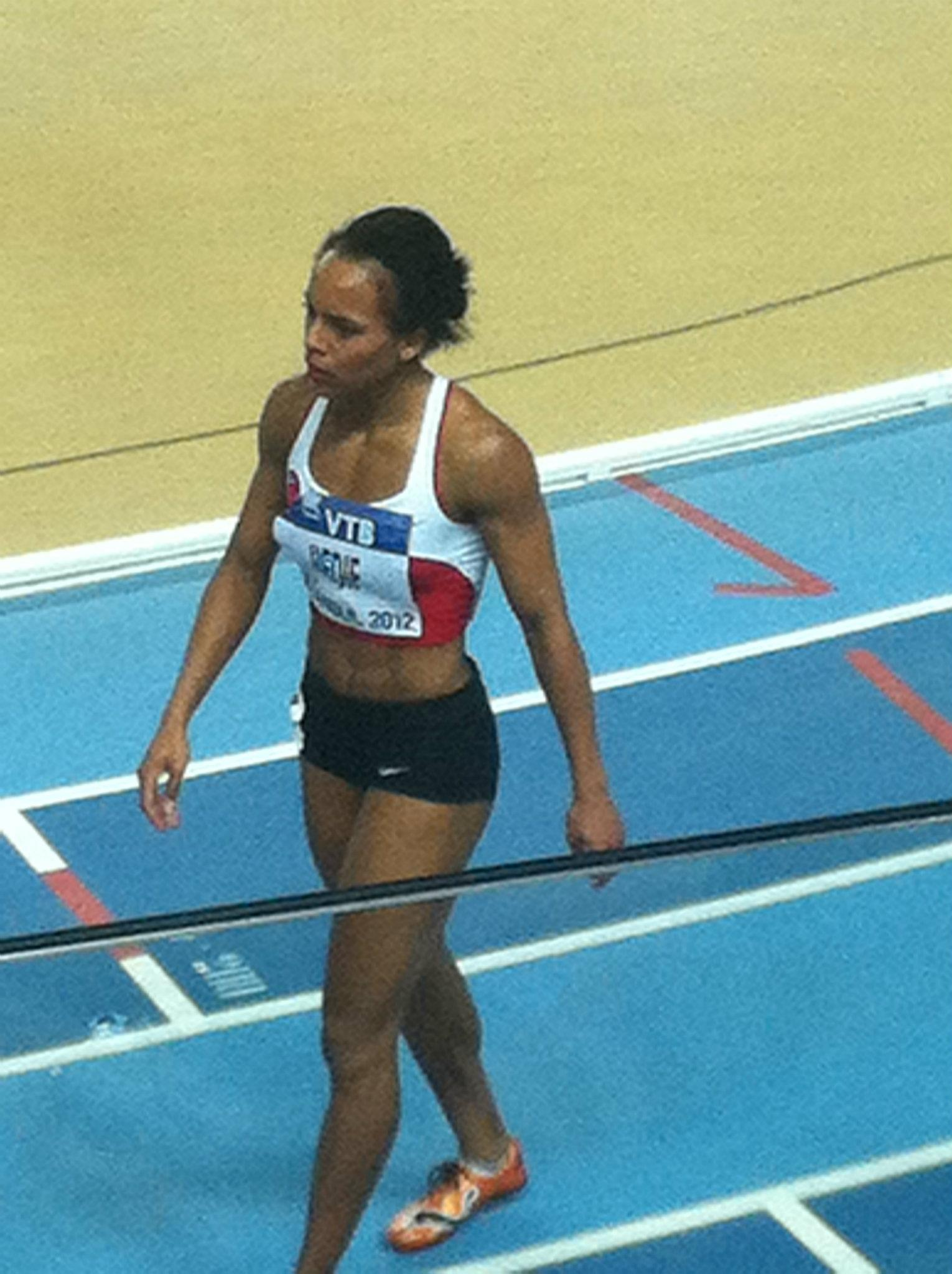

Personal information
- Nationality: Turkey
- Born: March 26, 1989 (age 37) North Nicosia
- Height: 1.68 m (5 ft 6 in)
- Weight: 58 kg (128 lb)

Sport
- Sport: Running
- Event(s): 200 metres, 400 metres
- Club: Fenerbahce Sport Club

Achievements and titles
- Personal bests: 200 m 23.93 (2008); 400 m 52.89 (2010)
Medal record
Women's athletics
Representing Turkey
Universiade
Silver medal – second place	2011 Shenzhen	4x400 m relay
European Team Championships
Gold medal – first place	2011 İzmir	4x400 m relay

Meliz Redif (born March 26, 1989) is a Turkish former athlete who specliased in 400m. Meliz Redif was a member of Fenerbahce Sport Club athletics team.

She won a gold medal in the 4 × 400 m relay event at the First League of 2011 European Team Championships held in İzmir, Turkey and a silver medal in the same event at the 2011 Summer Universiade held in Shenzhen, China.

== Doping ==
In 2015 Redif was banned from sport for three years after abnormal deviations in her biological passport profile were found.

== Achievements ==
Year	Competition	Venue	Position	Event	Notes
Representing Turkey
2008	World Junior Championships	Bydgoszcz, Poland	34th (h)	200m	24.64 (wind: -0.1 m/s)
2008	World Junior Championships	Bydgoszcz, Poland	16th (sf)	400m	54.29
2009	European Athletics Indoor Championships	Turin, Italy	5th	4 × 400 m relay	3:37.37 NR
2010	European Athletics Championships	Barcelona, Spain	5th	4 × 400 m relay	3:33.13 NR
2011	European Team Championships-First League	İzmir, Turkey	1st	4 × 400 m relay	3:29.40 NR
2011	European Athletics U23 Championships	Ostrava, Czech Republic	4th	400 m	53.08
2011	Universiade	Shenzhen, China	21st (qf)	200 m	24.29
2011	Universiade	Shenzhen, China	9th (sf)	400 m	53.38
2011	Universiade	Shenzhen, China	2nd	4 × 400 m relay	3:30.14
2012	World Indoor Championships	Istanbul, Turkey	16th (sf)	400 m	54.48
2012	Olympics	London, United Kingdom	7th (heat 2)	4 × 400 m	3:34.71
