= Alemitu Bekele Degfa =

Turkish long-distance runner

Alemitu Bekele
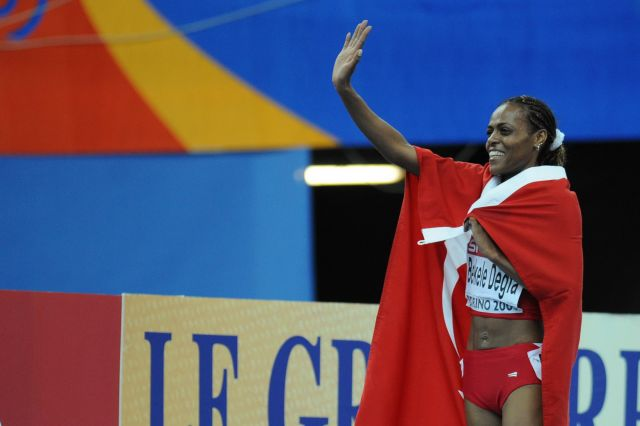
- Celebrating gold in Turin

Personal information
- Nationality: Turkish
- Born: 17 September 1977 (age 48) Shoa, Ethiopia

Sport
- Sport: Running
- Event(s): 3000 metres, 5000 metres
- Club: Üsküdar Belediyespor

Achievements and titles
- Personal best: 3000m: 8:35.19 5000m: 14:42.62
Medal record
Representing Turkey
Women's athletics
European Indoor Championships
Gold medal – first place	2009 Torino	3000 m
European Championships
Disqualified	2010 Barcelona	5000 m
Continental Cup
Disqualified	2010 Split	3000 m

Alemitu Bekele (Alemitu Bekele Degfa; born 17 September 1977) is an Ethiopian-born Turkish long-distance runner, who specialized in the 5000 metres.

Bekele was born in Shoa, Ethiopia. In the 5000 metres she finished seventh at the 2008 Olympic Games. In the 3000 metres she won the gold medal at the 2009 European Indoor Championships, and also competed at the 2008 World Indoor Championships, without reaching the final round.

She set an indoor European record at the beginning of 2010: her time of 14:46.44 at the GE Galan - a result later voided - was enough to beat Gabriela Szabo's 11-year-old mark. Despite this achievement, which made her the fifth fastest of all-time over the distance, she finished some 20 seconds adrift of winner Meseret Defar who narrowly missed the world record. This record was later rescinded due to a doping offense.

She won the 5000 m at the 2010 European Athletics Championships in a championship-record time of 14 minutes, 52.20 seconds - a result later voided - at Barcelona's Olympic stadium. She represented Team Europe at the 2010 IAAF Continental Cup and claimed the 3000 m silver medal - a result later voided. She opened her 2011 season at the Cinque Mulini and won the individual title as well as the team title for Üsküdar Belediyespor - results later voided - as part of the European Cross Country Club Championships.

== Doping ban ==
On 16 January 2013, the IAAF announced that she had been banned from competition for four years until 14 February 2016 due to use or attempted use of illegal drugs, and all her results since August 17, 2009 will be voided. This resulted from irregularities in her biological passport.

== Personal bests ==
Distance	Time	Location	Date
1500 m	4:06:32	Istanbul, Turkey	June 7, 2008
3000 m	8:55:51	Sofia, Bulgaria	July 5, 2007
3000 m (indoor)	8:46:50 NR	Turin, Italy	March 8, 2009
5000 m	15:05:85	İzmir, Turkey	May 31, 2008

- NR National record

== See also ==
- Turkish women in sports
