= Portugal at the 2010 European Athletics Championships =

- WA code: POR
- National federation: Federação Portuguesa de Atletismo
- Website: www.fpatletismo.pt

in Barcelona
- Competitors: 42 in 24 events
- Medals: Gold 0 Silver 4 Bronze 1 Total 5

European Athletics Championships appearances
- 1934; 1938; 1946; 1950; 1954; 1958; 1962; 1966; 1969; 1971; 1974; 1978; 1982; 1986; 1990; 1994; 1998; 2002; 2006; 2010; 2012; 2014; 2016; 2018; 2022; 2024

Portugal was represented at the 2010 European Athletics Championships, held in Barcelona, Spain, from 27 July to 1 August 2010, with a delegation of 42 competitors (24 men and 18 women), who took part in 24 events.

== Medalists ==
Medal	Name	Event	Date
Silver	Jéssica Augusto	Women's 10,000 m	28 July
Silver	Naide Gomes	Women's long jump	28 July
Silver	Sara Moreira	Women's 5000 m	1 August
Silver	João Vieira	Men's 20 km walk	27 July
Bronze	Jéssica Augusto	Women's 5000 m	1 August

== Participants ==
Event	Men	Women
100 m	Francis Obikwelu	
200 m	Francis Obikwelu; Arnaldo Abrantes	Sónia Tavares
5000 m	Eduardo Mbengani; Rui Pedro Silva; Yousef El Kalai	Ana Dulce Félix; Sara Moreira; Jessica Augusto
10,000 m	José Rocha; Yousef El Kalai	Ana Dulce Félix; Sara Moreira; Jessica Augusto
400 m hurdles	João Ferreira	Patrícia Lopes
3000 m steeplechase	Alberto Paulo; Mário Teixeira; Pedro Ribeiro	
20 km walk	João Vieira; Sérgio Vieira	Ana Cabecinha; Inês Henriques; Vera Santos
50 km walk	Augusto Cardoso; António Pereira	
Marathon	Alberto Chaíça; Fernando Silva; Hermano Ferreira; José Moreira; Luís Moreira	Ana Dias; Fernanda Ribeiro; Mónica Rosa; Marisa Barros
Pole Vault	Edi Maia	Maria Eleonor Tavares; Sandra Tavares
Long Jump	Gaspar Araújo	Naide Gomes
Triple Jump		Patrícia Mamona
Shot Put	Marco Fortes	Antónia Borges
Discus Throw		Liliana Cá
4 × 100 m relay	Arnaldo Abrantes; Francis Obikwelu; João Ferreira; Ricardo Monteiro; Yazaldes Nascimentos	
