= Elvan Abeylegesse =

Ethiopian long-distance runner who represented Turkey. (born 1982)

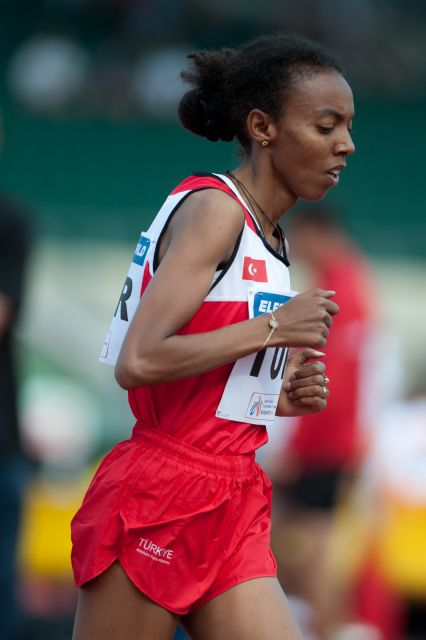
- Elvan Abeylegesse

Personal information
- Nationality: Ethiopian / Turkish
- Born: 11 September 1982 (age 43) Addis Ababa, Ethiopia
- Height: 1.59 m (5.2 ft)
- Weight: 40 kg (88 lb)

Sport
- Sport: Running
- Events: 5000 metres, 10,000 metres
- Club: Enkaspor Athletics Team
- Coached by: Carol Santa

Achievements and titles
- Personal bests: 5000m: 14:24.68; 10000m: 29:56.34
Medal record
Representing Turkey
Women's athletics
Olympic Games
Disqualified	2008 Beijing	5000 m
Disqualified	2008 Beijing	10,000 m
World Championships
Disqualified	2007 Osaka	10,000 m
European Championships
Gold medal – first place	2010 Barcelona	10,000 m
Gold medal – first place	2010 Barcelona	5000 m
Bronze medal – third place	2006 Gothenburg	5000 m
Mediterranean Games
Disqualified	2009 Pescara	10,000 m
Silver medal – second place	2013 Mersin	10,000 m

Elvan Abeylegesse (née Hewan Abeye (አልቫን አበይለገሠ, Amharic), also formerly Elvan Can (Turkish); born 11 September 1982) is an Ethiopian former middle and long-distance running athlete who represented Turkey. She competed over distances from 1500 metres up to the marathon, and also in cross country. She is a former world record-holder for the 5000 metres, at 14:24.68.

In August 2015, the Turkish Athletics Federation confirmed Abeylegesse had failed that an anti-doping test taken during the 2007 World Championships. She was stripped of her results from 2007 to 2009, including two Olympic medals and one World Championship medal, and banned from athletics for two years.

== Early life and career ==
Abeylegesse was born Hewan Abeye on 11 September 1982 in Addis Ababa, Ethiopia and raised with her seven brothers and sisters. She began her career running cross country. In 1999, she started for the Ethiopian junior team at the IAAF World Cross Country Championships in Belfast, Northern Ireland and finished ninth. There, she was invited to a meeting in Istanbul, Turkey. She decided to move to Turkey and became a Turkish citizen after marrying a Turkish national. She took the name Elvan Can. Later she divorced and took the name Elvan Abeylegesse.

Registered in the Enka Sports Club in Istanbul, she is coached by Ertan Hatipoglu, a former triple jumper of Turkish origin from Bulgaria.

=== Career highlights ===
Abeylegesse's career in the international arena began at the age of 18 in Grosseto, Italy in 2001 by winning the European 3000 m and 5000 m titles, setting a national record for Turkey. She became a world leader with a time of 8:31:94 in the 3000 m in Brussels, Belgium in 2002 and with a time of 3:58.38 in the 1500 m in Moscow, Russia in 2004.

Abeylegesse has been a scholarship holder with the Olympic Solidarity program since August 2002.

At the Evergood Bergen Bislett Games in Norway on 11 June 2004, the sixth meeting of TDK Golden League, Abeylegesse broke the women's 5000 m world record, which had belonged to Chinese runner Jiang Bo since 1997 (14:28.09), improving the mark by over three seconds to 14:24.68. She became the first Turkish athlete ever to set a world record.

On 3 June 2006 her record time was beaten by Ethiopian Meseret Defar, who ran in 14:24.53 in New York City.

She ran at the inaugural World 10K Bangalore race in 2008 and finished in a dead heat with Grace Momanyi, with both runners eventually being declared joint victors.

She was the 2010 recipient of the Pierre de Coubertin World Fair Play Trophy, an annual award given by the International Fair Play Committee. She had lent a pair of running shoes to competitor Meselech Melkamu just moments before the beginning of the 10,000 metres final at the 2009 World Championships in Athletics. Having forgotten to bring her shoes to the track, Melkamu went on to take the silver.

Abeylegesse won the 2010 edition of the Ras Al Khaimah Half Marathon in a time of 1:07:07. This was the fastest ever time for a woman in the half marathon race and made her the sixth fastest woman overall. She played down suggestions of a permanent switch to longer road races, however, saying a marathon debut would have to wait until after the 2012 London Olympics.

At the 2010 European Athletics Championships, Abeylegesse won gold in the 10,000 m, finishing in 31 minutes, 10.23 seconds On 28 July 2010, and she won the silver medal in 5000m finishing in 14 minutes, 54.44 seconds on 1 August 2010. She narrowly missed out on a medal at the 2010 IAAF Continental Cup, finishing two seconds behind Molly Huddle in the 5000 m.

She returned to action in 2012 after her pregnancy and made her debut over 20 km, finishing as runner-up at the 20 Kilomètres de Paris. She was also runner-up in the 15K section of the Istanbul Eurasia Marathon. She won the Nice Half Marathon in April 2013. On 17 November 2013 she finished second at the Istanbul Marathon with a time of 2:29:30.

=== Doping ban ===
In August 2015, the Turkish Athletics Federation confirmed that an anti-doping test taken during the 2007 World Championships in Athletics had been retested and found to be positive for a controlled substance, and that the athlete had been temporarily suspended pending retesting of her 'B-sample'. If confirmed, Abeylegesse stood to lose her 2007 medal, and possibly other awards from that date. On 29 March 2017, IAAF confirmed the positive test, expunged her results from 25 August 2007 until 25 August 2009 (thereby stripping her of the two silver medals she had won at the 2008 Olympic Games), and banned her from athletics for two years.

== Personal life ==
Abeylegesse married her longtime partner Semeneh Debelie in February 2011 and decided to take the season off due to pregnancy. In July 2011, she gave birth to a girl named Arsema.

== International competitions ==
Year	Competition	Venue	Position	Event	Notes
Representing Turkey
1999	World Cross Country Championships	Belfast, Northern Ireland	9th	Junior race	22:03
1999	World Youth Championships	Bydgoszcz, Poland	5th	3000 metres	9:08.29
1999	European Junior Championships	Riga, Latvia	2nd	5000 metres	16:06.40
2000	World Cross Country Championships	Vilamoura, Portugal	90th	Short race	14:30
2000	World Junior Championships	Santiago, Chile	6th	3000m	9:28.20
2000	World Junior Championships	Santiago, Chile	6th	5000m	16:33.77
2001	World Cross Country Championships	Ostend, Netherlands	22nd	Junior race	23:30
2001	European Junior Championships	Grosseto, Italy	1st	3000 metres	8:53.42
2001	European Junior Championships	Grosseto, Italy	1st	5000 metres	15:21.12
2001	World Championships	Edmonton, Canada	8th (heats)	5000 metres	15:22.89
2001	Mediterranean Games	Tunis, Tunisia	3rd	10,000 metres	32:29.20
2001	European Cross Country Championships	Thun, Switzerland	1st	Junior race	10:35
2002	European Championships	Munich, Germany	7th	5000 metres	15:24.41
2002	IAAF Grand Prix Final	Paris, France	8th	3000 metres	9:01.50
2002	European Cross Country Championships	Medulin, Croatia	3rd	Junior race	20:19
2003	European U23 Championships	Bydgoszcz, Poland	1st	5000m	15:16.79
2003	World Championships	Paris, France	5th	5000 metres	14:53.56
2003	IAAF World Athletics Final	Monaco	1st	5000m	14:56.25
2004	European Champion Clubs' Cup	Moscow, Russia	1st	1500 metres	3:58.28
2004	European Cup	Istanbul, Turkey	1st	3000 metres	8:49.14
2004	Olympic Games	Athens, Greece	8th	1500 metres	4:00.67
2004	Olympic Games	Athens, Greece	12th	5000 metres	15:12.64
2004	IAAF World Athletics Final	Monaco	1st	5000m	14:59.19
2006	European Championships	Gothenburg, Sweden	3rd	5000 metres	14:59.29
2007	World Championships	Osaka, Japan	DSQ	10,000 metres	31:59.40
2008	Olympic Games	Beijing, China	DSQ	5000 metres	15:42.74
2008	Olympic Games	Beijing, China	DSQ	10,000 metres	29:56.34
2009	Mediterranean Games	Pescara, Italy	DSQ	10,000 metres	31:51.98
2010	European Championships	Barcelona, Spain	1st	5000 metres	14:54.44
2010	European Championships	Barcelona, Spain	1st	10,000 metres	31:10.23
2013	Mediterranean Games	Mersin, Turkey	2nd	10,000 meters	32:59.30
2019	World Championships	Doha, Qatar	DNF	Marathon	N/A

== Marathons ==
- Istanbul Marathon: 2013, 2nd, 2:29:30

== World records ==
- 11 June 2004, Bergen Bislett Games (Golden League), Bergen, Norway (5000 m) Gold (14:24:68) WR

== Personal bests ==
Discipline	Performance	Place	Date
1500 m	3:58:28	Moscow, Russia	30 May 2004
2000 m	5:33:83	İstanbul, Turkey	7 June 2003
3000 m	8:31:94	Brussels, Belgium	30 August 2002
5000 m	14:24:68	Bergen, Norway	11 June 2004
10,000 m	29:56:34	Beijing, China	15 August 2008

== Performance progression ==
Discipline	Season	Performance	Place	Date
1500 m	2004	3:58:28	Moscow, Russia	30 May 2004
1500 m	2003	4:07:25	Beograd, Serbia	25 May 2003
1500 m	2002	4:11:00	İzmir, Turkey	11 May 2002
1500 m	2001	4:11:31	Istanbul, Turkey	28 July 2001
2000 m	2003	5:33:83	Istanbul, Turkey	7 June 2003
3000 m	2004	8:35:83	Doha, Qatar	14 May 2004
3000 m	2003	8:42:29	İzmir, Turkey	11 May 2003
3000 m	2002	8:31:94	Brussels, Belgium	30 August 2002
3000 m	2001	8:53:42	Grosseto, Italy	21 July 2001
3000 m	2000	9:08:07	İzmir, Turkey	21 May 2000
3000 m	1999	9:08:29	Bydgoszcz, Poland	17 July 1999
5000 m	2004	14:24:68	Bergen, Norway	11 June 2004
5000 m	2003	14:53:56	Paris, France	30 August 2003
5000 m	2002	15:00:49	Hengelo, Netherlands	2 June 2002
5000 m	2001	15:21:12	Grosseto, Italy	20 July 2001
5000 m	2000	16:33:77	Santiago de Chile, Chile	17 October 2000
5000 m	1999	16:06:20	Riga, Latvia	7 August 1999
10000 m	2008	29:56.34	Beijing, China	15 August 2008
10000 m	2006	30:21.67	Antalya, Turkey	15 April 2006
10000m	2001	32:29:20	Tunis, Tunisia	12 September 2001

== See also ==
- Turkish women in sports

Records
Preceded by Jiang Bo	Women's 5000 m World Record Holder; 11 June 2004 – 3 June 2006	Succeeded by Meseret Defar
Preceded by Olga Yegorova	Women's 5000 m European Record Holder; 11 June 2004 – 19 July 2008	Succeeded by Liliya Shobukhova
Preceded by Paula Radcliffe	Women's 10,000 m European Record Holder; 15 August 2008 –	Succeeded by Incumbent
Sporting positions
Preceded by Berhane Adere	Women's 5000 m Best Year Performance; 2004	Succeeded by Meseret Defar
