= Norway at the 2010 European Athletics Championships =

Sporting event delegation

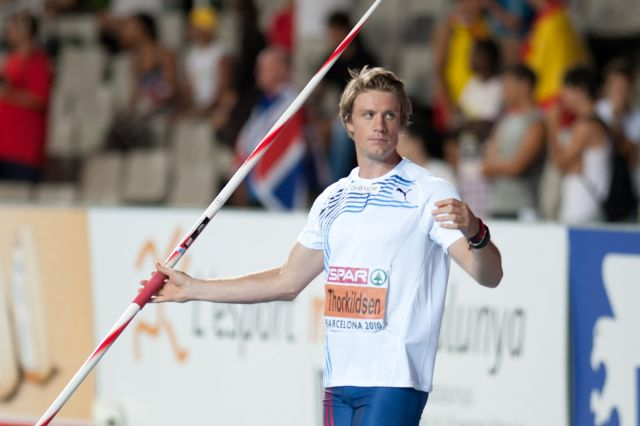
Andreas Thorkildsen at the 2010 European Athletics Championships in Barcelona

Norway was represented by 38 athletes (17 men and 21 women) at the 2010 European Athletics Championships held in Barcelona, Spain.

== Participants ==
Event	Men	Women
100 m	Jaysuma Saidy Ndure	Ezinne Okparaebo; Folake Akinyemi
200 m	Jaysuma Saidy Ndure	Folake Akinyemi
1500 m	Henrik Ingebrigtsen; Morten Velde	Ingvill Måkestad Bovim
5000 m	Sindre Buraas	Ragnhild Kvarberg
10,000 m	Sondre Nordstad Moen	Karoline Bjerkeli
Marathon	Øystein Sylta	Kjersti Karoline Danielsen; Kirsten Melkevik Otterbu; Christina Bus Holth
100 m hurdles		Christina Vukicevic
400 m hurdles	Andreas Totsås	Stine Tomb
3000 st.	Bjørnar Ustad Kristensen	
High Jump		Stine Kufaas; Tonje Angelsen
Pole Vault		Cathrine Larsåsen
Long Jump		Margrethe Renstrøm
Triple Jump		Inger Anne Frøysedal
Discus Throw	Gaute Myklebust	Grete Etholm
Hammer Throw	Eivind Henriksen	Mona Holm
Javelin Throw	Andreas Thorkildsen	
Decathlon	Lars Vikan Rise	
Heptathlon		Ida Marcussen
50 km walk	Trond Nymark	
4 x 100 m relay	Jaysuma Saidy Ndure; Philip Bjørnå Berntsen; Christian S. Mogstad; Tormod H. Larsen; Simon Rønsholm Sandvik	Ezinne Okparaebo; Folake Akinyemi; Siri Eritsland; Mari Gilde Brubak; Ida Bakke Hansen

== Results ==
2010 Barcelona	Gold	Silver	Bronze	Total
Norway (NOR)	1	0	0	0
