= 2010 European Athletics Championships =

2010 edition of the European Athletics Championships

20th European Athletics Championships
- Dates: 27 July – 1 August
- Host city: Barcelona, Catalonia, Spain
- Venue: Estadi Olímpic Lluís Companys
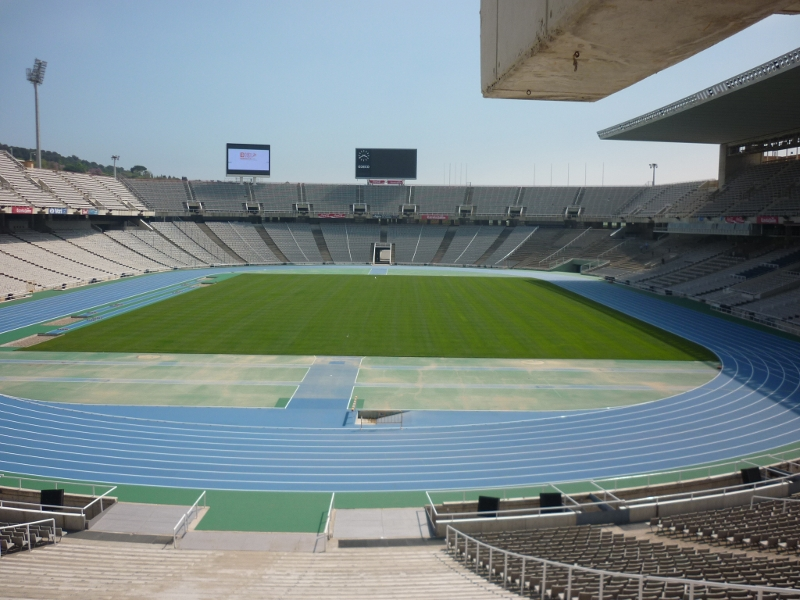
- Level: Senior
- Type: Outdoor
- Events: 47 (men: 24; women: 23)
- Participation: 1,368 athletes from 50 nations
- Records set: 8 Championships records

The 2010 European Athletics Championships were the 20th edition of the European Athletics Championships, organised under the supervision of the European Athletic Association. They were held at the Estadi Olímpic Lluís Companys in Barcelona, Catalonia, Spain from 27 July to 1 August 2010. Barcelona was the first Spanish city to host the European Championships.

Barni was the mascot of the event, he was the main promotional tool of the Championship. His name comes from Barna and was designed by the workshop Dortoka.

== Event schedule ==
Legend
Key	P	Q	H	½	F
Value	Preliminary round	Qualifiers	Heats	Semifinals	Final

Men
Date →	27		28			29		30			31		1	
Event ↓	M	A	M	A		M	A	M	A		M	A	M	A
100 m	H	H		½	F									
200 m						H	½		F					
400 m	H			½					F					
800 m			H				½					F		
1500 m				H					F					
5000 m							H					F		
10,000 m		F												
Marathon													F	
110 m hurdles						H			½	F				
400 m hurdles			H				½					F		
3000 m steeplechase								H						F
4 × 100 m relay											Q			F
4 × 400 m relay											Q			F
20 km walk	F													
50 km walk								F						
Long jump									Q					F
Triple jump		Q					F							
High jump		Q					F							
Pole vault						Q						F		
Shot put								Q				F		
Discus throw											Q			F
Hammer throw	Q			F										
Javelin throw								Q				F		
Decathlon			F											

Women
Date	27		28		29			30		31			1	
Event ↓	M	A	M	A	M	A		M	A	M	A		M	A
100 m			H			½	F							
200 m								H	½		F			
400 m				H					F					
800 m		H		½					F					
1500 m									H					F
5000 m														F
10,000 m				F										
Marathon										F				
100 m hurdles								H			½	F		
400 m hurdles	H			½					F					
3000 m steeplechase			H						F					
4 × 100 m relay										Q				F
4 × 400 m relay										Q				F
20 km walk			F											
-														
Long jump	Q			F										
Triple jump					Q						F			
High jump								Q						F
Pole vault			Q						F					
Shot put	Q	F												
Discus throw	Q			F										
Hammer throw			Q						F					
Javelin throw		Q				F								
Heptathlon								F						

== Men's results ==
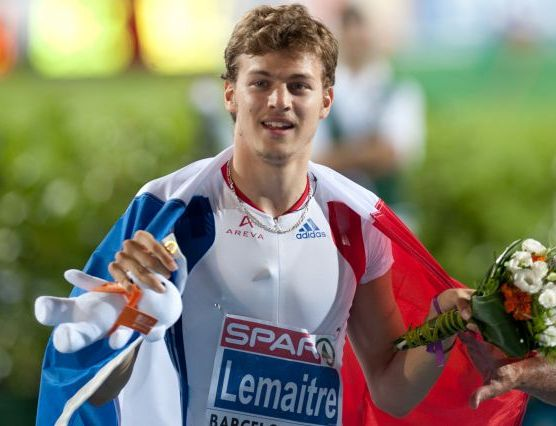
Christophe Lemaitre

=== Track ===
2002 | 2006 | 2010 | 2012 | 2014

Event	Gold		Silver		Bronze	
100 metres	Christophe Lemaitre; France	10.11	Mark Lewis-Francis; Great Britain & N.I.	10.18	Martial Mbandjock; France	10.18
200 metres	Christophe Lemaitre; France	20.37	Christian Malcolm; Great Britain & N.I.	20.38 SB	Martial Mbandjock; France	20.42
400 metres	Kevin Borlée; Belgium	45.08 SB	Michael Bingham; Great Britain & N.I.	45.23	Martyn Rooney; Great Britain & N.I.	45.23
800 metres	Marcin Lewandowski; Poland	1:47.07	Michael Rimmer; Great Britain & N.I.	1:47.17	Adam Kszczot; Poland	1:47.22
1500 metres	Arturo Casado; Spain	3:42.74	Carsten Schlangen; Germany	3:43.52	Manuel Olmedo; Spain	3:43.54
5000 metres	Mo Farah; Great Britain & N.I.	13:31.18	Jesús España; Spain	13:33.12	Hayle Ibrahimov; Azerbaijan	13:34.15
10,000 metres	Mo Farah; Great Britain & N.I.	28:24.99	Chris Thompson; Great Britain & N.I.	28:27.33	Daniele Meucci; Italy	28:27.33
Marathon	Viktor Röthlin; Switzerland	2:15:31	José Manuel Martínez; Spain	2:17:50	Dmitry Safronov; Russia	2:18:16
110 metres hurdles	Andy Turner; Great Britain & N.I.	13.28 SB	Garfield Darien; France	13.34 PB	Dániel Kiss; Hungary	13.39
400 metres hurdles	Dai Greene; Great Britain & N.I.	48.12 EL	Rhys Williams; Great Britain & N.I.	48.96 PB	Stanislav Melnykov; Ukraine	49.09 PB
3000 metres steeplechase	Mahiedine Mekhissi-Benabbad; France	8:07.87 CR	Bouabdellah Tahri; France	8:09.28	Ion Luchianov; Moldova	8:19.64 SB
20 kilometres walk	Alex Schwazer^{1} Italy	1:20:38	João Vieira; Portugal	1:20:49 SB	Robert Heffernan; Ireland	1:21:00
50 kilometres walk	Yohann Diniz; France	3:40:37 EL	Grzegorz Sudoł; Poland	3:42:24 PB	Sergey Bakulin; Russia	3:43:26 PB
4 × 100 metres relay	France; Jimmy Vicaut; Christophe Lemaitre; Pierre-Alexis Pessonneaux; Martial Mbandjock	38.11 EL	Italy; Roberto Donati; Simone Collio; Emanuele Di Gregorio; Maurizio Checcucci	38.17 NR	Germany; Tobias Unger; Marius Broening; Alexander Kosenkow; Martin Keller	38.44
4 × 400 metres relay	Russia; Maksim Dyldin; Aleksey Aksyonov; Vladimir Krasnov; Pavel Trenikhin	3:02.14	Great Britain; Conrad Williams; Michael Bingham; Martyn Rooney; Robert Tobin	3:02.25	Belgium; Arnaud Destatte; Kevin Borlée; Cédric Van Branteghem; Jonathan Borlée	3:02.60
WR world record | AR area record | CR championship record | GR games record | NR national record | OR Olympic record | PB personal best | SB season best | WL world leading (in a given season)

^{1} Stanislav Emelyanov of Russia originally won the 20 km walk gold medal with a time of 1:20:10, but he was disqualified in 2014 after he tested positive for drugs.

=== Field ===
2002 | 2006 | 2010 | 2012 | 2014

Event	Gold		Silver		Bronze	
High jump	Aleksandr Shustov; Russia	2.33	Ivan Ukhov; Russia	2.31	Martyn Bernard; Great Britain & N.I.	2.29
Pole vault	Renaud Lavillenie; France	5.85	Maksym Mazuryk; Ukraine	5.80 SB	Przemysław Czerwiński; Poland	5.75 SB
Long jump	Christian Reif; Germany	8.47 CR, WL, PB	Kafétien Gomis; France	8.24 PB	Chris Tomlinson; Great Britain & N.I.	8.23 SB
Triple jump	Phillips Idowu; Great Britain & N.I.	17.81 PB	Marian Oprea; Romania	17.51 SB	Teddy Tamgho; France	17.45
Shot put	Tomasz Majewski^{2} Poland	21.00	Ralf Bartels; Germany	20.93	Māris Urtāns; Latvia	20.72
Discus throw	Piotr Małachowski; Poland	68.87 CR	Robert Harting; Germany	68.47	Róbert Fazekas; Hungary	66.43 SB
Javelin throw	Andreas Thorkildsen; Norway	88.37	Matthias de Zordo; Germany	87.81 PB	Tero Pitkämäki; Finland	86.67
Hammer throw	Libor Charfreitag; Slovakia	80.02	Nicola Vizzoni; Italy	79.12	Krisztián Pars; Hungary	79.06
Decathlon	Romain Barras; France	8453 EL, PB	Eelco Sintnicolaas; Netherlands	8436 PB	Andrei Krauchanka; Belarus	8370 SB
WR world record | AR area record | CR championship record | GR games record | NR national record | OR Olympic record | PB personal best | SB season best | WL world leading (in a given season)

^{2} Andrei Mikhnevich of Belarus originally won the gold medal in 21.01 m, but was disqualified in 2013 (all his results starting from the 2005 World Championships were canceled).

== Women's results ==
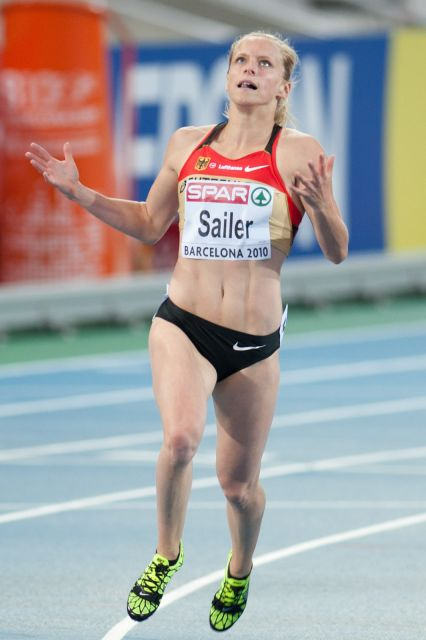
Verena Sailer

=== Doping cases ===
The women's medal standings were significantly altered after various post-race doping controversies. The following medals were revoked years after the event for doping cases, and assigned to the athletes who followed in the ranking.

Rank	Athlese	Country	Performance	Event
1st place, gold medalist(s)	Tatyana Firova	Russia	49.89	400 m
1st place, gold medalist(s)	Mariya Savinova	Russia	1:58.22	800 m
1st place, gold medalist(s)	Alemitu Bekele	Turkey	14:52.20	5000 m
2nd place, silver medalist(s)	Inga Abitova	Russia	31:22.83	10,000 m
1st place, gold medalist(s)	Živile Balciunaite	Lithuania	2:31:14	Marathon
2nd place, silver medalist(s)	Nailya Yulamanova	Russia	2:32:15	Marathon
1st place, gold medalist(s)	Olga Kaniskina	Russia	1:27:44	20 km race walk
1st place, gold medalist(s)	Marta Domínguez	Spain	9:17.74	3000 m steeplechase
3rd place, bronze medalist(s)	Lyubov Kharlamova	Russia	9:29.82	3000 m steeplechase
1st place, gold medalist(s)	Anastasiya Kapachinskaya; Antonina Krivoshapka; Kseniya Ustalova; Tatyana Firova	Russia	3:21.26	4 × 400 m relay
1st place, gold medalist(s)	Nadzeya Ostapchuk	Belarus	20.48 m	Shot put
2nd place, silver medalist(s)	Natallia Mikhnevich	Belarus	19.53 m	Shot put

=== Track ===
2002 | 2006 | 2010 | 2012 | 2014

Event	Gold		Silver		Bronze	
100 metres	Verena Sailer; Germany	11.10 PB	Véronique Mang; France	11.11 PB	Myriam Soumaré; France	11.18 PB
200 metres	Myriam Soumaré; France	22.32 EL, PB	Yelizaveta Bryzhina; Ukraine	22.44 PB	Aleksandra Fedoriva; Russia	22.44
400 metres	Kseniya Ustalova; Russia	49.92 PB	Antonina Krivoshapka; Russia	50.10 SB	Libania Grenot; Italy	50.43 SB
800 metres	Yvonne Hak; Netherlands	1:58.85 PB	Jenny Meadows; Great Britain & N.I.	1:59.39	Lucia Klocová; Slovakia	1:59.64
1500 metres	Nuria Fernández; Spain	4:00.20 PB	Hind Dehiba; France	4:01.17	Natalia Rodríguez; Spain	4:01.30 SB
5000 metres	Elvan Abeylegesse; Turkey	14:54.44	Sara Moreira; Portugal	14:54.71 PB	Jéssica Augusto; Portugal	14.58.47
10,000 metres	Elvan Abeylegesse; Turkey	31:10.23 EL	Jéssica Augusto; Portugal	31:25.77	Hilda Kibet; Netherlands	31:36.90 SB
Marathon	Anna Incerti; Italy	2:32:48	Tetyana Filonyuk; Ukraine	2:33:57	Isabellah Andersson; Sweden	2:34:43
100 metres hurdles	Nevin Yanıt; Turkey	12.63 NR	Derval O'Rourke; Ireland	12.65 NR	Carolin Nytra; Germany	12.68
400 metres hurdles	Natalya Antyukh; Russia	52.92 CR, EL	Vania Stambolova; Bulgaria	53.82 NR	Perri Shakes-Drayton; Great Britain & N.I.	54.18 PB
3000 metres steeplechase	Yuliya Zarudneva; Russia	9:17.57 CR	Hatti Dean; Great Britain & N.I.	9:30.19 PB	Wioletta Frankiewicz; Poland	9:34.13
20 kilometres walk	Anisya Kirdyapkina; Russia	1:28:55	Vera Sokolova; Russia	1:29:32	Melanie Seeger; Germany	1:29:43
4 × 100 metres relay	Ukraine; Olesya Povh; Nataliya Pohrebnyak; Mariya Ryemyen; Yelizaveta Bryzhina	42.29 WL	France; Myriam Soumaré; Véronique Mang; Lina Jacques-Sébastien; Christine Arron	42.45	Poland; Marika Popowicz; Daria Korczyńska; Marta Jeschke; Weronika Wedler	42.68 NR
4 × 400 metres relay	Germany; Janin Lindenberg; Esther Cremer; Fabienne Kohlmann; Claudia Hoffmann	3:24.07	Great Britain; Nicola Sanders; Marilyn Okoro; Perri Shakes-Drayton; Lee McConnell	3:24.32	Italy; Chiara Bazzoni; Marta Milani; Maria Enrica Spacca; Libania Grenot	3:25.71
WR world record | AR area record | CR championship record | GR games record | NR national record | OR Olympic record | PB personal best | SB season best | WL world leading (in a given season)

- Živilė Balčiūnaitė (LIT) won the Marathon, but was disqualified for doping after testing positive for testosterone.
- Nailiya Yulamanova (RUS) came second in the Marathon, and was set to be upgraded to gold winner after Živilė Balčiūnaitė was disqualified. However, in July 2012, Yulamanova was also disqualified for doping, and her results from 20 August 2009 onwards were annulled due to abnormalities in her biological passport profile.
- Mariya Savinova (RUS) won the 800 metres but was disqualified in 2017 for doping, and her result annulled.

=== Field ===
2002 | 2006 | 2010 | 2012 | 2014

Event	Gold		Silver		Bronze	
High jump	Blanka Vlašić; Croatia	2.03 =CR, =EL	Emma Green; Sweden	2.01 PB	Ariane Friedrich; Germany	2.01
Pole vault	Svetlana Feofanova; Russia	4.75 SB	Silke Spiegelburg; Germany	4.65	Lisa Ryzih; Germany	4.65 PB
Long jump	Ineta Radēviča; Latvia	6.92 NR	Naide Gomes; Portugal	6.92 SB	Olga Kucherenko; Russia	6.84
Triple jump	Olha Saladukha; Ukraine	14.81 EL	Simona La Mantia; Italy	14.56 SB	Svetlana Bolshakova; Belgium	14.55 NR
Shot put	Anna Avdeyeva; Russia	19.39	Yanina Pravalinskay-Karolchyk; Belarus	19.29	Olga Ivanova; Russia	19.02
Discus throw	Sandra Perković; Croatia	64.67	Nicoleta Grasu; Romania	63.48	Joanna Wiśniewska; Poland	62.37 SB
Hammer throw	Betty Heidler; Germany	76.38 SB	Tatyana Lysenko; Russia	75.65	Anita Włodarczyk; Poland	73.56
Javelin throw	Linda Stahl; Germany	66.81 PB	Christina Obergföll; Germany	65.58	Barbora Špotáková; Czech Republic	65.36
Heptathlon	Jessica Ennis; Great Britain & N.I.	6823 CR, WL, PB	Nataliya Dobrynska; Ukraine	6778 PB	Jennifer Oeser; Germany	6683 PB
WR world record | AR area record | CR championship record | GR games record | NR national record | OR Olympic record | PB personal best | SB season best | WL world leading (in a given season)

== Participating nations ==
- Albania (2)
- Andorra (6)
- Armenia (3)
- Austria (15)
- Azerbaijan (5)
- Belarus (42)
- Belgium (32)
- Bosnia and Herzegovina (2)
- Bulgaria (17)
- Croatia (12)
- Cyprus (10)
- Czech Republic (41)
- Denmark (15)
- Estonia (17)
- Finland (39)
- France (60)
- Georgia (2)
- Germany (74)
- Gibraltar (1)
- Great Britain and Northern Ireland (72)
- Greece (33)
- Hungary (23)
- Iceland (6)
- Ireland (30)
- Israel (16)
- Italy (73)
- Latvia (21)
- Liechtenstein (1)
- Lithuania (25)
- Luxembourg (1)
- Macedonia (2)
- Malta (2)
- Moldova (6)
- Monaco (1)
- Montenegro (2)
- Netherlands (36)
- Norway (38)
- Poland (71)
- Portugal (42)
- Romania (33)
- Russia (105)
- San Marino (2)
- Serbia (11)
- Slovakia (19)
- Slovenia (33)
- Spain (host) (88)
- Sweden (41)
- Switzerland (22)
- Turkey (20)
- Ukraine (62)

In brackets: Squad size

== Medal table ==
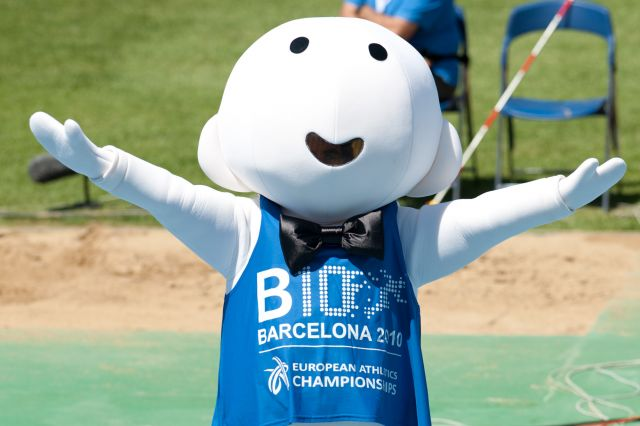
Mascot "Barni"

* Host nation (Spain)

Rank	Nation	Gold	Silver	Bronze	Total
1	France (FRA)	8	6	4	18
2	Russia (RUS)	8	4	5	17
3	Great Britain (GBR)	6	10	4	20
4	Germany (GER)	5	6	6	17
5	Poland (POL)	3	1	6	10
6	Turkey (TUR)	3	0	0	3
7	Ukraine (UKR)	2	4	1	7
8	Italy (ITA)	2	3	3	8
9	Spain (ESP)*	2	2	2	6
10	Croatia (CRO)	2	0	0	2
11	Netherlands (NED)	1	1	1	3
12	Belgium (BEL)	1	0	2	3
13	Latvia (LAT)	1	0	1	2
13	Slovakia (SVK)	1	0	1	2
15	Norway (NOR)	1	0	0	1
15	Switzerland (SUI)	1	0	0	1
17	Portugal (POR)	0	4	1	5
18	Romania (ROU)	0	2	0	2
19	Belarus (BLR)	0	1	1	2
19	Ireland (IRL)	0	1	1	2
19	Sweden (SWE)	0	1	1	2
22	Bulgaria (BUL)	0	1	0	1
23	Hungary (HUN)	0	0	3	3
24	Azerbaijan (AZE)	0	0	1	1
24	Czech Republic (CZE)	0	0	1	1
24	Finland (FIN)	0	0	1	1
24	Moldova (MDA)	0	0	1	1
Totals (27 entries)		47	47	47	141

- † = Totals following the removal of José Luis Blanco bronze medal in the steeplechase due to positive doping test.
- †2 = Totals following the removal of Nailya Yulamanova gold medal in the marathon due to positive doping test.
- †3 = Totals following the removal of Andrei Mikhnevich gold medal in the shot put due to positive doping test.
- †4 = Totals following the disqualification of Marta Domínguez.

== See also ==
- List of stripped European Athletics Championships medals
- 2010 African Championships in Athletics
