= Romania at the 2010 European Athletics Championships =

Sporting event delegation

Romania were represented by 33 athletes at the 2010 European Athletics Championships held in Barcelona, Spain.

== Participants ==
Event	Men	Women
100 m		Andreea Ogrăzeanu
200 m		Andreea Ogrăzeanu
400 m	Cătălin Cîmpeanu	
800 m	Cristian Vorovenci	
1500 m		Liliana Barbulescu
5000 m		Roxana Bârca
10,000 m	Marius Ionescu	
Marathon		Lidia Șimon; Daniela Cârlan
110/100 m hurdles	Alexandru Mihailescu	
400 m hurdles	Nagy Attila Csongr	Angela Moroșanu
3000 m steeplechase		Ancuța Bobocel
High jump	Mihai Donisan	Georgiana Zarcan
Long jump		Cornelia Deiac; Viorica Țigău
Triple jump	Marian Oprea	Adelina Gavrilă; Carmen Toma; Alina Popescu
Discus throw	Mihai Grasu; Sergiu Ursu	Nicoleta Grasu
Hammer throw		Bianca Perie
Javelin throw		Maria Negoita; Felicia Țilea-Moldovan
20 km walk	Silviu Casandra	
4 × 400 m relay	Cătălin Cîmpeanu; Nagy Attila Csongr; Adrian Dragan; Iulian Geambazu	Angela Moroșanu; Mirela Lavric; Adelina Pastor; Bianca Răzor; Anamaria Ioniță

== Results ==
2010 Barcelona	Gold	Silver	Bronze	Total
Romania (ROU)	0	2	0	2
