= France at the 2010 European Athletics Championships =

Sporting event delegation

France were represented by 60 athletes (43 men and 17 women) at the 2010 European Athletics Championships held in Barcelona, Spain.

== Participants ==
Event	Men	Women
100 m	Christophe Lemaitre; Martial Mbandjock; Ronald Pognon	Véronique Mang; Christine Arron
200 m	Christophe Lemaitre; David Alerte; Martial Mbandjock	Lina Jacques-Sébastien; Myriam Soumaré; Véronique Mang
400 m	Leslie Djhone; Yannick Fonsat	Muriel Hurtis-Houairi; Virginie Michanol
800 m	Hamid Oualich	
1500 m	Yoann Kowal	
5 000 m	Nouredine Smaïl	
10,000 m	Abdellatif Meftah	
Marathon	James Theuri	
110/100 m hurdles	Garfield Darien; Dimitri Bascou	
400 m hurdles	Fadil Bellaabouss; Héni Kechi; Sébastien Maillard	
3000 m steeplechase	Bouabdellah Tahri; Mahiedine Mekhissi-Benabbad; Vincent Zouaoui-Dandrieux	Sophie Duarte
Pole Vault	Renaud Lavillenie; Damiel Dossevi; Romain Mesnil	
Long Jump	Salim Sdiri; Kafétien Gomis	Éloyse Lesueur
Triple Jump	Teddy Tamgho; Benjamin Compaoré	
Shot Put	Yves Niaré	
Hammer Throw	Nicolas Figère	Stephanie Falzon
Javelin Throw	Jérôme Haeffler	
Decathlon/Heptathlon	Romain Barras; Nadir El Fassi; Florian Geffrouais	Antoinette Nana Djimou Ida
20 km walk	Hervé Davaux	
50 km walk	Yohann Diniz	
4 × 100 m relay	Christophe Lemaitre; Martial Mbandjock; Jimmy Vicaut; David Alerte; Ronald Pognon; Pierre-Alexis Pessonneaux	Véronique Mang; Christine Arron; Myriam Soumaré; Lina Jacques-Sébastien; Céline Distel; Nelly Banco; Muriel Hurtis-Houairi
4 × 400 m relay	Leslie Djhone; Yannick Fonsat; Teddy Venel; Mamadou Hanne; Mame-Ibra Anne; Youness Gurachi	Muriel Hurtis-Houairi; Virginie Michanol; Floria Gueï; Virginie Michanol; Marie-Angélique Lacordelle

== Results ==
2010 Barcelona	Gold	Silver	Bronze	Total
France (FRA)	8	6	4	18
