= France at the 2014 European Athletics Championships =

- WA code: FRA
- National federation: FFA
- Website: www.athle.fr

in Zürich
- Competitors: 65 in 35 events
- Medals Ranked 2nd: Gold 9 Silver 8 Bronze 6 Total 23

European Athletics Championships appearances (overview)
- 1934; 1938; 1946; 1950; 1954; 1958; 1962; 1966; 1969; 1971; 1974; 1978; 1982; 1986; 1990; 1994; 1998; 2002; 2006; 2010; 2012; 2014; 2016; 2018; 2022; 2024

France are competing at the 2014 European Athletics Championships in Zürich, Switzerland, from 12 to 17 August 2014. In the men's 3000 metres steeplechase, Mahiedine Mekhissi-Benabbad won the race, but he was later disqualified after he took off his shirt while running down the home straight. The gold was then awarded to Yoann Kowal.

== Medals ==
Medal	Name	Event	Date
Gold	Mahiedine Mekhissi-Benabbad	Men's 1,500 m	17 August
Gold	Yoann Kowal	Men's 3,000 m steeplechase	14 August
Gold	Benjamin Compaoré	Men's triple jump	14 August
Gold	Renaud Lavillenie	Men's pole vault	16 August
Gold	Yohann Diniz	Men's 50 km walk	15 August
Gold	Eloyse Lesueur	Women's long jump	13 August
Gold	Christelle Daunay	Women's marathon	16 August
Gold	Phara Anacharsis; Marie Gayot; Floria Gueï; Muriel Hurtis; Estelle Perrossier; Agnès Raharolahy	Women's 4 × 400 m relay	17 August
Gold	Ida Antoinette Nana Djimou	Women's heptathlon	15 August
Silver	Christophe Lemaitre	Men's 100 m	13 August
Silver	Christophe Lemaitre	Men's 200 m	15 August
Silver	Kévin Mayer	Men's Decathlon	13 August
Silver	Myriam Soumaré	Women's 100 m	13 August
Silver	Clémence Calvin	Women's 10000 m	12 August
Silver	Cindy Billaud	Women's 100 m hurdles	13 August
Silver	Stella Akakpo; Céline Distel-Bonnet; Ayodelé Ikuesan; Myriam Soumaré	Women's 4 × 100 m relay	17 August
Silver	Mélina Robert-Michon	Women's discus throw	16 August
Bronze	Pascal Martinot-Lagarde	Men's 110 m hurdles	14 August
Bronze	Ben Bassaw; Christophe Lemaitre; Teddy Tinmar; Pierre Vincent	Men's 4 × 100 m relay	17 August
Bronze	Kafétien Gomis	Men's long jump	17 August
Bronze	Kévin Menaldo	Men's pole vault	16 August
Bronze	Myriam Soumaré	Women's 200 m	15 August
Bronze	Laila Traby	Women's 10000 m	12 August

== Results ==
Men
Track and road

Event	Athletes	Heats		Semifinal		Final	
Event	Athletes	Result	Rank	Result	Rank	Result	Rank
100 metres	Christophe Lemaitre	10.16	1 Q	10.10	2 Q	10.13	2nd place, silver medalist(s)
100 metres	Jimmy Vicaut	10.06	1 Q	DNS		Did not advance	
200 metres	Ben Bassaw	20.68	3 Q	20.62	5	Did not advance	
200 metres	Christophe Lemaitre	20.43	1 Q	20.26	1 Q	20.15	2nd place, silver medalist(s)
400 metres	Mame-Ibra Anne	45.57	1 Q	45.79	5	Did not advance	
400 metres	Yannick Fonsat	46.23	4 Q	46.83	7	Did not advance	
800 metres	Pierre-Ambroise Bosse	1:47.54	2 Q	1:45.94	1 Q	1:46.55	8
800 metres	Paul Renaudie	1:47.88	3 Q	1:47.54	4	Did not advance	
800 metres	Sofiane Selmouni	1:48.46	3 Q	1:51.01	7	Did not advance	
1500 metres	Florian Carvalho	—		3:40.39	6	Did not advance	
1500 metres	Mahiedine Mekhissi-Benabbad	—		3:39.43	3 Q	3:45.60	1st place, gold medalist(s)
5000 metres	Bouabdellah Tahri	—				14:11.62	6
10,000 metres	Yassine Mandour	—				DNF	
10,000 metres	Bouabdellah Tahri	—				28:25.03	7
Marathon	Jean-Damascene Habarurema	—				2:16:04	13
Marathon	Benjamin Malaty	—				2:17:09	15
Marathon	Abdellatif Meftah	—				2:13:16	6
Marathon	El Hassane Ben Lkhainouch	—				2:17:54	16
110 m hurdles	Dimitri Bascou	13.35	1 Q	13.33	1 Q	DQ	
110 m hurdles	Pascal Martinot-Lagarde	13.29	1 Q	13.17	1 Q	13.29	3rd place, bronze medalist(s)
110 m hurdles	Thomas Martinot-Lagarde	13.46	2 Q	13.50	5	Did not advance	
400 m hurdles	Yoann Décimus	49.60	3 Q	49.71	4	Did not advance	
3000 metres steeplechase	Yoann Kowal	—		8:36.27	4 Q	8:26.66	1st place, gold medalist(s)
3000 metres steeplechase	Mahiedine Mekhissi-Benabbad	—		8:33.44	5 Q	DQ	
20 km walk	Antonin Boyez	—				1:25:31	21
20 km walk	Kevin Campion	—				1:23:04	11
50 km walk	Yohann Diniz	—				3:32:33 WR	1st place, gold medalist(s)
4 × 100 metres relay	Ben Bassaw; Christophe Lemaitre; Teddy Tinmar; Pierre Vincent	38.55	2 Q	—		38.47	3rd place, bronze medalist(s)
4 × 400 metres relay	Mame-Ibra Anne; Teddy Venel; Mamoudou-Elimane Hanne; Thomas Jordier	3:00.80	2 Q	—		2:59.89	4

Field events

Event	Athletes	Qualification		Final	
Event	Athletes	Distance	Position	Distance	Position
High jump	Mickaël Hanany	2.19	19	Did not advance	
Pole vault	Renaud Lavillenie	5.60	1 q	5.90	1st place, gold medalist(s)
Pole vault	Kévin Menaldo	5.50	3 q	5.70	3rd place, bronze medalist(s)
Long jump	Kafétien Gomis	7.83	7 q	8.14	3rd place, bronze medalist(s)
Long jump	Salim Sdiri	7.74	15	Did not advance	
Triple jump	Benjamin Compaoré	16.83	2 Q	17.46	1st place, gold medalist(s)
Triple jump	Yoann Rapinier	16.80	4 Q	17.01	4
Shot put	Gaetan Bucki	20.21	4 Q	19.75	11

Combined events – Decathlon

Athlete	Event	100 m	LJ	SP	HJ	400 m	110H	DT	PV	JT	1500 m	Final	Rank
Florian Geffrouais	Result	11.16	6.89	14.85	1.95	49.19	14.82	42.72	4.60	59.46	4:23.84	7900	13
Florian Geffrouais	Points	825	788	780	758	852	871	720	790	730	786	7900	13
Kevin Mayer	Result	11.10	7.65	15.14	2.01	49.23	14.28	44.53	5.20	64.03	4:24.16	8521	2nd place, silver medalist(s)
Kevin Mayer	Points	838	972	798	813	850	939	757	972	799	783	8521	2nd place, silver medalist(s)
Gael Querin	Result	11.11	7.59	14.02	1.98	48.76	14.23	43.08	4.90	51.67	4:14.73	8194	9
Gael Querin	Points	836	957	730	785	873	945	727	880	613	848	8194	9

Women
Track and road

Event	Athletes	Heats		Semifinal		Final	
Event	Athletes	Result	Rank	Result	Rank	Result	Rank
100 metres	Céline Distel-Bonnet	11.25	3 Q	11.24	3 q	11.38	6
100 metres	Ayodelé Ikuesan	11.32	3 Q	11.22	3 q	11.54	8
100 metres	Myriam Soumaré	11.03	1 Q	11.18	1 Q	11.16	2nd place, silver medalist(s)
200 metres	Jennifer Galais	DQ		Did not advance			
200 metres	Myriam Soumaré	22.97	2 Q	22.56	1 Q	22.58	3rd place, bronze medalist(s)
400 metres	Marie Gayot	51.80	3 Q	52.11	4 q	52.14	7
400 metres	Floria Gueï	52.42	4 q	52.82	5	Did not advance	
800 metres	Justine Fedronic	2:02.01	4 q	2:04.39	8	Did not advance	
800 metres	Rénelle Lamote	2:03.92	2 Q	2:03.90	7	Did not advance	
10,000 metres	Clémence Calvin	—				32:23.58	2nd place, silver medalist(s)
10,000 metres	Sophie Duarte	—				DNF	
10,000 metres	Laila Traby	—				32:26.03	3rd place, bronze medalist(s)
100 metres hurdles	Cindy Billaud	12.75	1 Q	12.79	1 Q	12.79	2nd place, silver medalist(s)
Marathon	Christelle Daunay	—				2:25:14	1st place, gold medalist(s)
4 × 100 metres relay	Stella Akakpo; Céline Distel-Bonnet; Ayodelé Ikuesan; Myriam Soumaré	42.29	1 Q	—		42.45	2nd place, silver medalist(s)
4 × 400 metres relay	Phara Anacharsis; Marie Gayot; Floria Gueï; Muriel Hurtis; Estelle Perrossier; Agnès Raharolahy	3:28.58	2 Q	—		3:24.27	1st place, gold medalist(s)

Field events

Event	Athletes	Qualification		Final	
Event	Athletes	Distance	Position	Distance	Position
Pole vault	Vanessa Boslak	4.25	17	Did not advance	
Pole vault	Marion Fiack	4.35	14	Did not advance	
Pole vault	Marion Lotout	4.45	12 q	NM	
Long jump	Eloyse Lesueur	6.72	1 Q	6.85	1st place, gold medalist(s)
Discus throw	Mélina Robert-Michon	63.62	2 Q	65.33	2nd place, silver medalist(s)
Hammer throw	Alexandra Tavernier	70.91	4 Q	70.32	6

Combined events – Heptathlon

Athlete	Event	100H	HJ	SP	200 m	LJ	JT	800 m	Final	Rank
Ida Antoinette Nana Djimou	Result	13.05	1.76	14.35	24.52	6.25	54.18	2:15.22	6551	1st place, gold medalist(s)
Ida Antoinette Nana Djimou	Points	1117	928	817	931	927	941	890	6551	1st place, gold medalist(s)
