= Great Britain at the 2014 European Athletics Championships =

Great Britain and Northern Ireland at the 2014 European Athletics Championships
- WA code: GBR
- National federation: British Athletics
- Website: www.britishathletics.org.uk

in Zürich
- Competitors: 74 (as of 30 July 2014)
- Medals Ranked 1st: Gold 12 Silver 5 Bronze 6 Total 23

European Athletics Championships appearances
- 1934; 1938; 1946; 1950; 1954; 1958; 1962; 1966; 1969; 1971; 1974; 1978; 1982; 1986; 1990; 1994; 1998; 2002; 2006; 2010; 2012; 2014; 2016; 2018; 2022; 2024; 2026

Great Britain competed at the 2014 European Athletics Championships in Zürich, Switzerland, from 12–17 August 2014. British Athletics named a team of 74 athletes on 15 July 2014. Great Britain topped the medal table with their greatest gold medal haul in European Championships history. Adam Gemili won the nation's 100th gold medal in the history of the championships.

== Medals ==
Medal	Name	Event	Date
Gold	Jo Pavey	Women's 10,000 m	12 August
Gold	Mo Farah	Men's 10,000 m	13 August
Gold	Tiffany Porter	Women's 100 m hurdles	13 August
Gold	James Dasaolu	Men's 100 m	13 August
Gold	Martyn Rooney	Men's 400 m	15 August
Gold	Adam Gemili	Men's 200 m	15 August
Gold	Eilidh Child	Women's 400 m Hurdles	16 August
Gold	Martyn Rooney; Michael Bingham; Matthew Hudson-Smith; Conrad Williams	Men's 4 × 400m Relay	17 August
Gold	Mo Farah	Men's 5000 m	17 August
Gold	Adam Gemili; Richard Kilty; Harry Aikines-Aryeetey; James Ellington	Men's 4 × 100m Relay	17 August
Gold	Greg Rutherford	Men's long jump	17 August
Gold	Desiree Henry; Jodie Williams; Ashleigh Nelson; Asha Philip	Women's 4 × 100m Relay	17 August
Silver	Andy Vernon	Men's 10,000 m	13 August
Silver	Will Sharman	Men's 110 m Hurdles	14 August
Silver	Matthew Hudson-Smith	Men's 400 m	15 August
Silver	Jodie Williams	Women's 200 m	15 August
Silver	Lynsey Sharp	Women's 800 m	16 August
Bronze	Ashleigh Nelson	Women's 100 m	13 August
Bronze	Harry Aikines-Aryeetey	Men's 100 m	13 August
Bronze	Laura Weightman	Women's 1500 m	15 August
Bronze	Chris O'Hare	Men's 1500 m	17 August
Bronze	Margaret Adeoye; Shana Cox; Kelly Massey; Eilidh Child	Women's 4 × 400m Relay	17 August
Bronze	Andy Vernon	Men's 5000 m	17 August

== Results ==
Men

Track & road events

Athlete	Event	Heat		Semifinal		Final	
Athlete	Event	Result	Rank	Result	Rank	Result	Rank
Harry Aikines-Aryeetey	100 m	10.19	1 Q	10.21	1 Q	10.22	3rd place, bronze medalist(s)
Dwain Chambers	100 m	10.18	1 Q	10.25	2 Q	10.24	4
James Dasaolu	100 m	10.22	1 Q	10.04	1 Q	10.06	1st place, gold medalist(s)
James Ellington	200 m	20.55	2 Q	20.52	5	Did not advance	
Adam Gemili	200 m	20.39	1 Q	20.23	1 Q	19.98	1st place, gold medalist(s)
Danny Talbot	200 m	20.63	1 Q	20.62	6	Did not advance	
Matthew Hudson-Smith	400 m	46.07	1 Q	45.30	1 Q	44.75	2nd place, silver medalist(s)
Martyn Rooney	400 m	45.48	1 Q	45.40	1 Q	44.71	1st place, gold medalist(s)
Conrad Williams	400 m	45.90	3 Q	45.85	1 Q	45.53	5
Andrew Osagie	800 m	1:48.31	5	Did not advance			
Michael Rimmer	800 m	1:48.51	6	Did not advance			
Charlie Grice	1500 m	3:39.41	2 Q	—N/a		4:04.81	12
Chris O'Hare	1500 m	3:39.24	1 Q	—N/a		3:46.18	3rd place, bronze medalist(s)
Mo Farah	5000 m	—N/a				14:05.82	1st place, gold medalist(s)
Tom Farrell	5000 m	—N/a				14:15.93	12
Andy Vernon	5000 m	—N/a				14:09.48	3rd place, bronze medalist(s)
Mo Farah	10000 m	—N/a				28:08.11	1st place, gold medalist(s)
Andy Vernon	10000 m	—N/a				28:08.66	2nd place, silver medalist(s)
Lawrence Clarke	110 m hurdles	13.46	3 Q	13.47	3 Q	DNS	
William Sharman	110 m hurdles	13.29	1 Q	13.16	1 Q	13.27	2nd place, silver medalist(s)
Andy Turner	110 m hurdles	13.51	4 q	13.57	7	Did not advance	
Tom Burton	400 m hurdles	50.47	3 Q	50.47	5	Did not advance	
Niall Flannery	400 m hurdles	49.77	1 Q	50.15	6	Did not advance	
Sebastian Rodger	400 m hurdles	49.88	3 Q	49.47	4	Did not advance	
James Wilkinson	3000 m steeplechase	8:39.78	7	—N/a		Did not advance	
James Ellington; Harry Aikines-Aryeetey; Richard Kilty; Danny Talbot (Heat); Adam Gemili (Final)	4 × 100 m relay	38.26	1 Q	—N/a		37.93	1st place, gold medalist(s)
Nigel Levine (Heat); Michael Bingham; Rabah Yousif (Heat); Martyn Rooney; Conrad Williams; Matthew Hudson-Smith	4 × 400 m relay	3:00.65	1 Q	—N/a		2:58.79	1st place, gold medalist(s)
Tom Bosworth	20 km walk	—N/a				1:23:17	12

Field Events

Athlete	Event	Qualification		Final	
Athlete	Event	Distance	Rank	Distance	Rank
JJ Jegede	Long jump	7.81	8 q	7.88	9
Greg Rutherford	Long jump	8.03	3 Q	8.29	1st place, gold medalist(s)
Chris Tomlinson	Long jump	7.89	5 q	7.75	11
Julian Reid	Triple jump	16.52	13	Did not advance	
Chris Baker	High jump	2.23	=9 q	2.21	=11
Luke Cutts	Pole vault	5.30	=20	Did not advance	
Steven Lewis	Pole vault	5.50	=3 q	5.40	11

Combined events – Decathlon

Athlete	Event	100 m	LJ	SP	HJ	400 m	110H	DT	PV	JT	1500 m	Final	Rank
Ashley Bryant	Result	11.24	7.39	13.28	1.92	49.88	14.87	41.49	DNS	DNF		DNF	
Ashley Bryant	Points	808	908	684	731	820	865	695	DNS	DNF		DNF	

Women

Track & road events

Athlete	Event	Heat		Semifinal		Final	
Athlete	Event	Result	Rank	Result	Rank	Result	Rank
Desiree Henry	100 m	11.21	2 Q	11.21	2 Q	11.43	7
Ashleigh Nelson	100 m	11.19	2 Q	11.23	2 Q	11.22	3rd place, bronze medalist(s)
Asha Philip	100 m	11.28	2 Q	11.24	4	Did not advance	
Dina Asher-Smith	200 m	22.75	1 Q	22.61	2 Q	DNF	
Bianca Williams	200 m	23.38	1 Q	22.91	2 Q	22.68	4
Jodie Williams	200 m	22.88	1 Q	22.90	1 Q	22.46	2nd place, silver medalist(s)
Christine Ohuruogu	400 m	51.40	1 Q	52.56	2 Q	51.38	4
Jessica Judd	800 m	2:02.30	3 Q	2:01.53	3 Q	2:01.65	7
Alison Leonard	800 m	2:01.47	1 Q	DNF		Did not advance	
Lynsey Sharp	800 m	2:01.55	1 Q	2:01.32	1 Q	1:58.80	2nd place, silver medalist(s)
Hannah England	1500 m	4:10.73	5 q	—N/a		4:07.80	6
Laura Muir	1500 m	4:14.69	6	—N/a		Did not advance	
Laura Weightman	1500 m	4:10.55	4 Q	—N/a		4:06.32	3rd place, bronze medalist(s)
Emelia Gorecka	5000 m	—N/a				15:42.98	9
Joanne Pavey	5000 m	—N/a				15:38.41	7
Joanne Pavey	10000 m	—N/a				32:22.39	1st place, gold medalist(s)
Beth Potter	10000 m	—N/a				32:53.17	14
Tiffany Porter	100 m hurdles	12.69	1 Q	12.63	1 Q	12.76	1st place, gold medalist(s)
Eilidh Child	400 m hurdles	55.32	1 Q	54.71	1 Q	54.48	1st place, gold medalist(s)
Asha Philip; Ashleigh Nelson; Anyika Onuora (Heat); Jodie Williams; Desiree Henry	4 × 100 m relay	42.62	1 Q	—N/a		42.24	1st place, gold medalist(s)
Emily Diamond (Heat); Victoria Ohuruogu (Heat); Eilidh Child (Final); Kelly Massey; Shana Cox (Final); Margaret Adeoye	4 × 400 m relay	3:28.44	2 Q	—N/a		3:24.34	3rd place, bronze medalist(s)

Field Events

Athlete	Event	Qualification		Final	
Athlete	Event	Distance	Rank	Distance	Rank
Morgan Lake	High jump	1.85	=17	Did not advance	
Goldie Sayers	Javelin throw	58.07	9 Q	58.33	8
Sophie Hitchon	Hammer throw	62.93	19	Did not advance	

Key

- Note–Ranks given for track events are within the athlete's heat only
- Q = Qualified for the next round
- q = Qualified for the next round as a fastest loser or, in field events, by position without achieving the qualifying target
- NR = National record
- N/A = Round not applicable for the event
- Bye = Athlete not required to compete in round
