= Portugal at the 2014 European Athletics Championships =

- WA code: POR
- National federation: Federação Portuguesa de Atletismo
- Website: www.fpatletismo.pt

in Zürich
- Competitors: 44 in 27 events
- Medals Ranked 23rd: Gold 0 Silver 0 Bronze 1 Total 1

European Athletics Championships appearances
- 1934; 1938; 1946; 1950; 1954; 1958; 1962; 1966; 1969; 1971; 1974; 1978; 1982; 1986; 1990; 1994; 1998; 2002; 2006; 2010; 2012; 2014; 2016; 2018; 2022; 2024; 2026

Portugal competed at the 2014 European Athletics Championships, held in Zürich, Switzerland, from 12 to 17 August 2014. The national delegation consisted of 44 competitors (22 men and 22 women) – its largest ever at the European Athletics Championships – who took part in 27 events. Marathon runner Jéssica Augusto finished third in the women's event to secure Portugal's only medal.

Among the medal hopefuls competing at these Championships were 2012 medalists Ana Dulce Félix (gold in women's 10,000 metres), Patrícia Mamona (silver in women's triple jump) and Sara Moreira (bronze in women's 5000 metres). Félix was not able to defend her title and finished outside the top 10. while Mamona failed to qualify for the final. Moreira finished 5th in the 10,000 metres and 6th in the 5000 metres. Also competing were former European men's 100 and 200 metres champion Francis Obikwelu and former Olympic and World men's triple jump winner Nelson Évora. Obikwelu participated in the 4 × 100 metres relay and helped the team qualify for the final, where they failed to finish. Évora also qualified for the final, finishing in the 6th place.

== Medalists ==
Medal	Name	Event	Date
Bronze	Jéssica Augusto	Women's marathon	16 August

== Results ==
Key

- Q=Qualified by standard; q=Qualified by performance; NR=National record.

=== Men's events ===
==== Track and road ====
Athletes	Event	Heats		Semifinal		Final	
Athletes	Event	Result	Rank	Result	Rank	Result	Rank
Diogo Antunes	100 m	10.61	=32	did not advance			
Yazaldes Nascimento	100 m	10.27	7 Q	10.30	8 q	10.46	8
David Lima	200 m	21.25	26	did not advance			
Ricardo dos Santos	400 m	45.81 NR	11 Q	45.74 NR	9	did not advance	
Sandy Martins	800 m	1:49.51	26	did not advance			
Emanuel Rolim	1500 m	3:42.22	21	—N/a		did not advance	
Ricardo Ribas	10,000 m	—N/a				29:09.47	12
Hermano Ferreira	Marathon	—N/a				did not finish	
José Moreira	Marathon	—N/a				2:24:23	39
Ricardo Ribas	Marathon	—N/a				2:15:43	10
Rui Pedro Silva	Marathon	—N/a				did not finish	
João Almeida	110 m hurdles	13.58	=18	did not advance			
Alberto Paulo	3000 m steeplechase	8:47.18	24	—N/a		did not advance	
Arnaldo Abrantes; Diogo Antunes; David Lima; Yazaldes Nascimento; Francis Obikwelu; Edi Sousa	4 × 100 m relay	38.79 NR	7 q	—N/a		did not finish	
João Vieira	20 km walk	—N/a				did not finish	
Sérgio Vieira	20 km walk	—N/a				did not finish	
Pedro Isidro	50 km walk	—N/a				4:07:44	25

==== Field ====
Athletes	Event	Qualification		Final	
Athletes	Event	Distance	Position	Distance	Position
Nelson Évora	Triple jump	16.82	3 Q	16.78	6
Diogo Ferreira	Pole vault	5.50	11 q	No mark	
Edi Maia	Pole vault	5.50	14 q	5.60	8
Marco Fortes	Shot put	20.03	10 q	20.35	7

=== Women's events ===
==== Track and road ====
Athletes	Event	Heats		Semifinal		Final	
Athletes	Event	Result	Rank	Result	Rank	Result	Rank
Carla Tavares	100 m	11.78	32	did not advance			
Carla Tavares	200 m	23.90	27	did not advance			
Cátia Azevedo	400 m	52.87	18	did not advance			
Ana Dulce Félix	5000 m	—N/a				did not start	
Sara Moreira	5000 m	—N/a				15:38.13	6
Ana Dulce Félix	10,000 m	—N/a				32:35.90	12
Sara Moreira	10,000 m	—N/a				32:30.12	5
Carla Salomé Rocha	10,000 m	—N/a				33:05.49	16
Jéssica Augusto	Marathon	—N/a				2:25:41	3rd place, bronze medalist(s)
Marisa Barros	Marathon	—N/a				2:34:35	20
Filomena Costa	Marathon	—N/a				2:32:50	15
Doroteia Peixoto	Marathon	—N/a				did not finish	
Vera Barbosa	400 m hurdles	55.85	3 Q	56.33	10	did not advance	
Cátia Azevedo; Vera Barbosa; Andreia Crespo; Dorothé Évora; Filipa Martins; Miriam Tavares	4 × 400 m relay	3:35.41	10	—N/a		did not advance	
Ana Cabecinha	20 km walk	—N/a				1:28.40	6
Inês Henriques	20 km walk	—N/a				1:31.32	13

==== Field ====
Athletes	Event	Qualification		Final	
Athletes	Event	Distance	Position	Distance	Position
Susana Costa	Triple jump	13.76	9 q	13.78	8
Patrícia Mamona	Triple jump	13.62	13	did not advance	
Marta Onofre	Pole vault	4.15	24	did not advance	
Cátia Pereira	Pole vault	4.00	=25	did not advance	
Maria Leonor Tavares	Pole vault	4.00	=25	did not advance	
Irina Rodrigues	Discus throw	52.53	14	did not advance	
