= 2015 IAAF World Relays – Men's 4 × 200 metres relay =

Relay race held in the Bahamas

Men's 4 × 200 metres relay at the 2014 IAAF World Relays
- Venue: Thomas Robinson Stadium
- Dates: 3 May (heats & final)
- Nations: 21
- Winning time: 1:20.97

Medalists
gold medal	Nickel Ashmeade; Rasheed Dwyer; Jason Livermore; Warren Weir; Jamaica
silver medal	Teddy Tinmar; Christophe Lemaitre; Pierre-Alexis Pessonneaux; Ben Bassaw; France
bronze medal	Robin Erewa; Sven Knipphals; Aleixo-Platini Menga; Alexander Kosenkow; Germany

The men's 4 × 200 metres relay at the 2015 IAAF World Relays was held at the Thomas Robinson Stadium on 3 May.

On paper this race looked like a Jamaican record attempt with the American team their closest competitor. Jamaica brought all its guns, and strategically held out Usain Bolt and Nickel Ashmeade from the qualifying round. But when it came time for the final, Bolt was nowhere to be seen. A minor hamstring injury earlier in the meet kept the world record holder in the locker room listening to music when the finals were held. The first two legs went as scripted with Jamaica taking a significant lead, but at the second handoff, Jason Livermore seemed completely unprepared to take a handoff, standing flatfooted as Rasheed Dwyer passed him and handed the baton backward. Still the Jamaican handoff was legal, just costing the team valuable seconds. In the adjacent lane, the American team saw Curtis Mitchell line up in the wrong spot and while Isiah Young came in on the inside of his lane, Mitchell performed first a lane violation then after being passed by Young, a pirouette to drop the baton outside of the end of the zone. Mitchell picked up the baton to continue now well back in the field. Out of this chaos, the well trained French squad was left in the lead through the final turn. It was only the difference in Warren Weir's superior speed that allowed him to pass Ben Bassaw on the home stretch to take Jamaica to victory. USA crossed the line in third, but were disqualified for the handoff violation.

== Records ==
Prior to the competition, the records were as follows:

World record	Jamaica (Nickel Ashmeade, Warren Weir, Jermaine Brown, Yohan Blake)	1:18.63	(The Bahamas) Nassau, Bahamas	24 May 2014
Championship record	Jamaica (Nickel Ashmeade, Warren Weir, Jermaine Brown, Yohan Blake)	1:18.63	(The Bahamas) Nassau, Bahamas	24 May 2014
World Leading	United States (Joseph Morris, Maurice Mitchell, Ameer Webb, Wallace Spearmon)	1:20.64	Philadelphia, United States	25 April 2015
African Record	South Africa (Marcus la Grange, Mathew Quinn, Josef van der Linde, Paul Gorries)	1:22.06	Port Elizabeth, South Africa	1 March 2002
Asian Record	(Japan) Waseda University	1:22.12	Yokohama, Japan	14 September 2014
North, Central American and Caribbean record	Jamaica (Nickel Ashmeade, Warren Weir, Jermaine Brown, Yohan Blake)	1:18.63	(The Bahamas) Nassau, Bahamas	24 May 2014
South American Record	Guyana (Adam Harris, Winston George, Jeremy Bascom, Stephan James)	1:24.42	Philadelphia, United States	25 April 2015
European Record	France (Christophe Lemaitre, Yannick Fonsat, Ben Bassaw, Ken Romain)	1:20.66	(The Bahamas) Nassau, Bahamas	24 May 2014
Oceanian record	Australia (Scott Vassella, Shem Hollands, Dean Capobianco, Peter Vassella)	1:23.04	Sydney, Australia	6 December 1998

== Schedule ==
Date	Time	Round
3 May 2014	19:00	Heats
3 May 2014	21:20	Final

All times are local times (UTC−4)

== Results ==
KEY:	q	Fastest non-qualifiers	Q	Qualified	WL	World leading	NR	National record	SB	Seasonal best

=== Heats ===
Qualification: First 2 of each heat (Q) plus the 2 fastest times (q) advanced to the final.

Rank	Heat	Lane	Nation	Athletes	Time	Notes
1	1	7	Jamaica	Rasheed Dwyer, Jason Livermore, Jermaine Brown, Warren Weir	1:20.19	Q, WL
2	2	2	United States	Joseph Morris, Isiah Young, Justin Walker, Wallace Spearmon	1:20.78	Q
3	1	5	France	Pierre Vincent, Teddy Tinmar, Pierre-Alexis Pessonneaux, Ben Bassaw	1:21.41	Q, SB
4	1	3	Germany	Robin Erewa, Sven Knipphals, Aleixo-Platini Menga, Alexander Kosenkow	1:21.46	q, NR
5	2	5	Saint Kitts and Nevis	Antoine Adams, Lestrod Roland, Brijesh Lawrence, Allistar Clarke	1:22.36	Q, SB
6	2	8	Poland	Jakub Adamski, Remigiusz Olszewski, Karol Zalewski, Adam Pawłowski	1:22.38	q, SB
7	3	7	Bahamas	Deneko Brown, Andretti Bain, Alfred Higgs, Blake Bartlett	1:22.86	Q, SB
7	2	3	Barbados	Nicholas Deshong, Ramon Gittens, Levi Cadogan, Fallon Forde	1:22.86	SB
9	2	4	Turkey	Yavuz Can, Ramil Guliyev, Fatih Aktaş, Ali Ekber Kayaş	1:23.55	NR
10	3	8	Switzerland	Steven Gugerli, Pascal Mancini, Reto Schenkel, Suganthan Somasundaram	1:24.55	Q, NR
11	2	7	United States Virgin Islands	Tabarie Henry, Leslie Murray, David Walters, Leon Hunt	1:25.31	SB
	1	2	Antigua and Barbuda	Rai Benjamin, Daniel Bailey, Tahir Walsh, Miguel Francis	DNF	
	1	4	Cayman Islands	Kemar Hyman, Tyrell Cuffy, Gerome Bodden, Jamal Walton	DNF	
	3	2	Kenya	Mike Mokamba Nyang'Au, Carvin Nkanata, Collins Omae Gichana, Pius Muiya Musyoki	DQ	170.7
	1	6	Nigeria	Ejowvokoghene Oduduru, Nicholas Imhoaperamhe, Orukpe Eraiyokan, Robert Simmons	DQ	170.7
	2	6	China	Wu Zhiqiang, Mo Youxue, Yang Yang, Xie Zhenye	DQ	170.7
	1	8	Namibia	Jesse Urikhob, Hitjivirue Kaanjuka, Gilbert Hainuca, Adiel Van Wyk	DQ	163.3
	3	5	Canada	Gavin Smellie, Aaron Brown, Oluwasegun Makinde, Dontae Richards-Kwok	DQ	170.6
	3	4	Papua New Guinea	Theo Piniau, Kevin Kapmatana, Richard Dotaona, Paul Pokana	DQ	170.18
	3	6	Italy		DNS	
	3	3	Trinidad and Tobago		DNS	

=== Final ===
The final was started at 21:29.

Rank	Lane	Nation	Athletes	Time	Notes
1st place, gold medalist(s)	6	Jamaica	Nickel Ashmeade, Rasheed Dwyer, Jason Livermore, Warren Weir	1:20.97	
2nd place, silver medalist(s)	4	France	Teddy Tinmar, Christophe Lemaitre, Pierre-Alexis Pessonneaux, Ben Bassaw	1:21.49	
3rd place, bronze medalist(s)	1	Germany	Robin Erewa, Sven Knipphals, Aleixo-Platini Menga, Alexander Kosenkow	1:22.65	
4	2	Poland	Jakub Adamski, Remigiusz Olszewski, Kamil Masztak, Karol Zalewski	1:22.85	
5	3	Bahamas	Deneko Brown, Andretti Bain, Alfred Higgs, Blake Bartlett	1:22.91	
6	7	Saint Kitts and Nevis	Antoine Adams, Lestrod Roland, Brijesh Lawrence, Allistar Clarke	1:22.92	
7	8	Switzerland	Steven Gugerli, Pascal Mancini, Reto Schenkel, Suganthan Somasundaram	1:24.37	NR
	5	United States	Wallace Spearmon, Isiah Young, Curtis Mitchell, Justin Gatlin	DQ	170.7
