= 2014 European Athletics Championships – Women's 400 metres =

Women's 400 metres at the 2014 European Athletics Championships
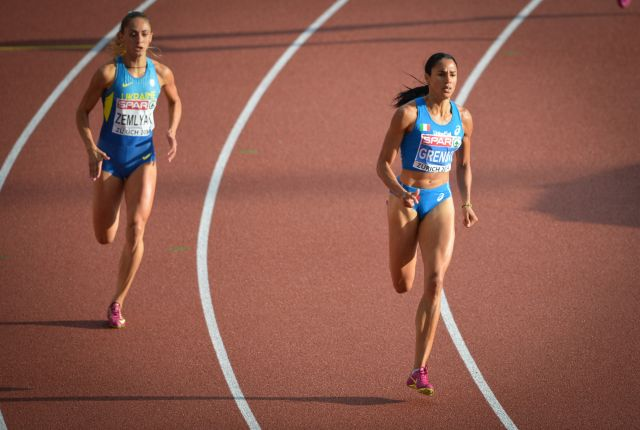
- Winner Libania Grenot (right) and runner-up Olha Zemlyak during the final
- Venue: Letzigrund
- Location: Zürich, Switzerland
- Dates: 12 August 2014 (round 1); 13 August 2014 (semifinals); 15 August 2014 (final)
- Competitors: 29 from 18 nations
- Winning time: 51.10 s

Medalists
gold medal	Libania Grenot	Italy
silver medal	Olha Zemlyak	Ukraine
bronze medal	Indira Terrero	Spain

The women's 400 metres at the 2014 European Athletics Championships was held over three rounds at the Letzigrund in Zürich, Switzerland, on 12, 13, and 15 August 2014. It was the seventeenth time the event was contested at the European Athletics Championships.

Twenty-nine athletes from eighteen nations competed in round 1, where sixteen athletes qualified for the semifinals. Eight athletes advanced further to the final, which was won by Libania Grenot of Italy in 51.10 seconds, followed by Olha Zemlyak of Ukraine in second place in 51.36 s and Indira Terrero of Spain in third place in 51.38 s.

== Background ==
Records before the 2014 European Athletics Championships
Record	Athlete (nation)	Time	Location	Date
World record	Marita Koch (GDR)	47.60	Canberra, Australia	6 October 1985
European record	Marita Koch (GDR)	47.60	Canberra, Australia	6 October 1985
Championship record	Marita Koch (GDR)	48.16	Athens, Greece	8 September 1982
World leading	Francena McCorory (USA)	49.48	Sacramento, California, United States	28 June 2014
European leading	Libania Grenot (ITA)	50.55	Rovereto, Italy	19 July 2014

== Results ==
=== Round 1 ===
The four heats of round 1 were held on 12 August, starting at 18:00 (UTC+2).

The first three athletes in each heat (Q) and the four next best performers overall (q) qualified for the semifinals.

Results of round 1
Rank	Heat	Lane	Athlete	Nation	Time	Notes
1	4	5	Olha Zemlyak	Ukraine	51.16	Q
2	2	6	Christine Ohuruogu	Great Britain & N.I.	51.40	Q, SB
3	1	4	Indira Terrero	Spain	51.62	Q, SB
4	1	3	Bianca Răzor	Romania	51.77	Q, SB
5	1	6	Marie Gayot	France	51.80	Q, SB
6	4	6	Aauri Lorena Bokesa	Spain	51.86	Q
7	2	7	Libania Grenot	Italy	51.90	Q
8	3	7	Nataliya Pyhyda	Ukraine	51.95	Q, SB
9	4	2	Esther Cremer	Germany	51.98	Q
10	3	3	Małgorzata Hołub	Poland	52.00	Q
11	1	8	Tatyana Veshkurova	Russia	52.06	q
12	1	5	Chiara Bazzoni	Italy	52.19	q, SB
13	3	4	Agnė Šerkšnienė	Lithuania	52.42	Q
14	3	1	Floria Gueï	France	52.42	q
15	4	8	Justyna Święty	Poland	52.43	q
16	2	3	Kseniya Zadorina	Russia	52.57	Q
17	2	4	Patrycja Wyciszkiewicz	Poland	52.73	
18	2	5	Cátia Azevedo	Portugal	52.87	
19	2	8	Iveta Putalová	Slovakia	53.25	PB
20	3	2	Adelina Pastor	Romania	53.30	
21	1	7	Gunta Latiševa-Cudare	Latvia	53.37	SB
22	4	4	Tamara Marković	Serbia	53.41	
22	3	8	Katri Mustola	Finland	53.41	
22	4	3	Maria Enrica Spacca	Italy	53.41	
25	4	7	Line Kloster	Norway	54.27	
26	2	2	Tara Marie Norum	Norway	54.89	
27	1	2	Modesta Morauskaitė	Lithuania	55.87	
28	3	6	Amaliya Sharoyan	Armenia	56.49	
29	3	5	Hristina Risteska	Macedonia	57.47	PB

=== Semifinals ===
The two heats of the semifinals were held on 13 August, starting at 19:06 (UTC+2).

The first three athletes in each heat (Q) and the two next best performers overall (q) qualified for the final.

Results of the semifinals
Rank	Heat	Lane	Athlete	Nation	Time	Notes
1	2	5	Olha Zemlyak	Ukraine	51.24	Q
2	2	6	Libania Grenot	Italy	51.47	Q
3	2	4	Aauri Lorena Bokesa	Spain	51.84	Q
4	1	4	Indira Terrero	Spain	52.07	Q
5	2	7	Marie Gayot	France	52.11	q
6	2	3	Bianca Răzor	Romania	52.22	q
7	2	8	Agnė Šerkšnienė	Lithuania	52.32	
8	1	6	Christine Ohuruogu	Great Britain & N.I.	52.56	Q
9	1	5	Małgorzata Hołub	Poland	52.58	Q
10	1	3	Nataliya Pyhyda	Ukraine	52.70	
11	1	1	Floria Gueï	France	52.82	
12	1	7	Esther Cremer	Germany	52.83	
13	2	2	Justyna Święty	Poland	52.85	
14	2	1	Tatyana Veshkurova	Russia	52.93	
15	1	2	Chiara Bazzoni	Italy	53.50	
	1	8	Kseniya Zadorina	Russia	DNF	

=== Final ===
The final was held on 15 August, starting at 19:10 (UTC+2).

Results of the final
Rank	Lane	Athlete	Nation	Time	Notes
1st place, gold medalist(s)	3	Libania Grenot	Italy	51.10	
2nd place, silver medalist(s)	4	Olha Zemlyak	Ukraine	51.36	
3rd place, bronze medalist(s)	6	Indira Terrero	Spain	51.38	SB
4	5	Christine Ohuruogu	Great Britain & N.I.	51.38	SB
5	7	Małgorzata Hołub	Poland	51.84	PB
6	1	Bianca Răzor	Romania	51.95	
7	2	Marie Gayot	France	52.14	
8	8	Aauri Lorena Bokesa	Spain	52.39	
