= 2014 European Athletics Championships – Men's 200 metres =

Men's 200 metres at the 2014 European Athletics Championships
- Venue: Letzigrund
- Location: Zurich
- Dates: 14 August (heats & semi-finals); 15 August (final)
- Competitors: 32 from 22 nations
- Winning time: 19.98

Medalists
gold medal	Adam Gemili	Great Britain
silver medal	Christophe Lemaître	France
bronze medal	Serhiy Smelyk	Ukraine

The men's 200 metres at the 2014 European Athletics Championships took place at the Letzigrund on 14 and 15 August.

The event was won by Great Britain's Adam Gemili in 19.98 seconds. Christophe Lemaitre of France, the defending champion, came second just as he did in the 100 metres, and Serhiy Smelyk of Ukraine came third.

== Records ==
Standing records prior to the 2014 European Athletics Championships
World record	Usain Bolt (JAM)	19.19	Berlin, Germany	20 August 2009
European record	Pietro Mennea (ITA)	19.72	Mexico City, Mexico	12 September 1979
Championship record	Konstantinos Kenteris (GRE)	19.85	Munich, Germany	9 August 2002
World Leading	Justin Gatlin (USA)	19.68	Monaco	18 July 2014
European Leading	Christophe Lemaître (FRA)	20.08	Monaco	18 July 2014
Broken records during the 2014 European Athletics Championships
European Leading	Adam Gemili (GBR)	19.98	Zürich, Switzerland	15 August 2014

== Schedule ==
Date	Time	Round
14 August 2014	12:05	Round 1
14 August 2014	20:15	Semi-finals
15 August 2014	21:50	Final

== Results ==
=== Heat 1 ===
Rank	Lane	Athlete	Nation	Time	Notes
1	5	Serhiy Smelyk	Ukraine	20.49	Q
2	6	Ramil Guliyev	Turkey	20.59	Q
3	8	Ben Bassaw	France	20.68	Q
4	3	Robin Erewa	Germany	20.72	q
5	4	Sergio Ruiz	Spain	20.73	q, SB
6	7	Enrico Demonte	Italy	20.90	
7	1	Petar Kremenski	Bulgaria	21.75	
8	2	Riste Pandev	Macedonia	21.96	
				Wind: -1.5 m/s	

=== Heat 2 ===
Rank	Lane	Athlete	Nation	Time	Notes
1	4	Christophe Lemaitre	France	20.43	Q
2	2	James Ellington	Great Britain	20.55	Q
3	7	Alex Wilson	Switzerland	20.61	Q, SB
4	8	Johan Wissman	Sweden	20.82	
5	3	İzzet Safer	Turkey	21.06	
6	6	David Lima	Portugal	21.25	
7	5	Fabian Haldner	Liechtenstein	23.06	
–	1	Julian Reus	Germany	DNS	
				Wind: +0.4 m/s	

=== Heat 3 ===
Rank	Lane	Athlete	Nation	Time	Notes
1	6	Daniel Talbot	Great Britain	20.63	Q
2	2	Lykourgos-Stefanos Tsakonas	Greece	20.64	Q
3	8	Diego Marani	Italy	20.65	Q
4	4	Karol Zalewski	Poland	20.76	q
5	3	Nil de Oliveira	Sweden	20.93	
6	5	Kevin Moore	Malta	21.03	NR
7	1	Marek Niit	Estonia	21.04	
8	7	Jan Žumer	Slovenia	21.47	
				Wind: -0.4 m/s	

=== Heat 4 ===
Rank	Lane	Athlete	Nation	Time	Notes
1	6	Adam Gemili	Great Britain	20.39	Q
2	4	Eseosa Desalu	Italy	20.55	Q, PB
3	8	Churandy Martina	Netherlands	20.60	Q, SB
4	1	Alex-Platini Menga	Germany	20.71	q
5	7	Jaysuma Saidy Ndure	Norway	20.78	
6	5	Jonathan Åstrand	Finland	21.03	
7	3	Joel Burgunder	Switzerland	21.24	
8	2	Mikel de Sa	Andorra	22.54	
				Wind: -0.2 m/s	

=== Semi-finals ===
First 3 in each heat (Q) and 2 best performers (q) advance to the Final.

==== Heat 1 ====
Rank	Lane	Athlete	Nation	Time	Notes
1	5	Christophe Lemaitre	France	20.26	Q
2	3	Serhiy Smelyk	Ukraine	20.32	Q, PB
3	7	Diego Marani	Italy	20.36	Q, PB
4	4	Ramil Guliyev	Turkey	20.38	q, NR
5	6	James Ellington	Great Britain	20.52	
6	8	Alex Wilson	Switzerland	20.76	
7	1	Robin Erewa	Germany	20.82	
8	2	Sergio Ruiz	Spain	20.85	
				Wind: -0.4 m/s	

==== Heat 2 ====
Rank	Lane	Athlete	Nation	Time	Notes
1	6	Adam Gemili	Great Britain	20.23	Q
2	7	Churandy Martina	Netherlands	20.40	Q, SB
3	5	Lykourgos-Stefanos Tsakonas	Greece	20.40	Q, PB
4	1	Karol Zalewski	Poland	20.52	q
5	8	Ben Bassaw	France	20.62	
6	3	Daniel Talbot	Great Britain	20.62	
7	4	Eseosa Desalu	Italy	20.73	
8	2	Alex-Platini Menga	Germany	20.89	
				Wind: +0.4 m/s	

=== Final ===
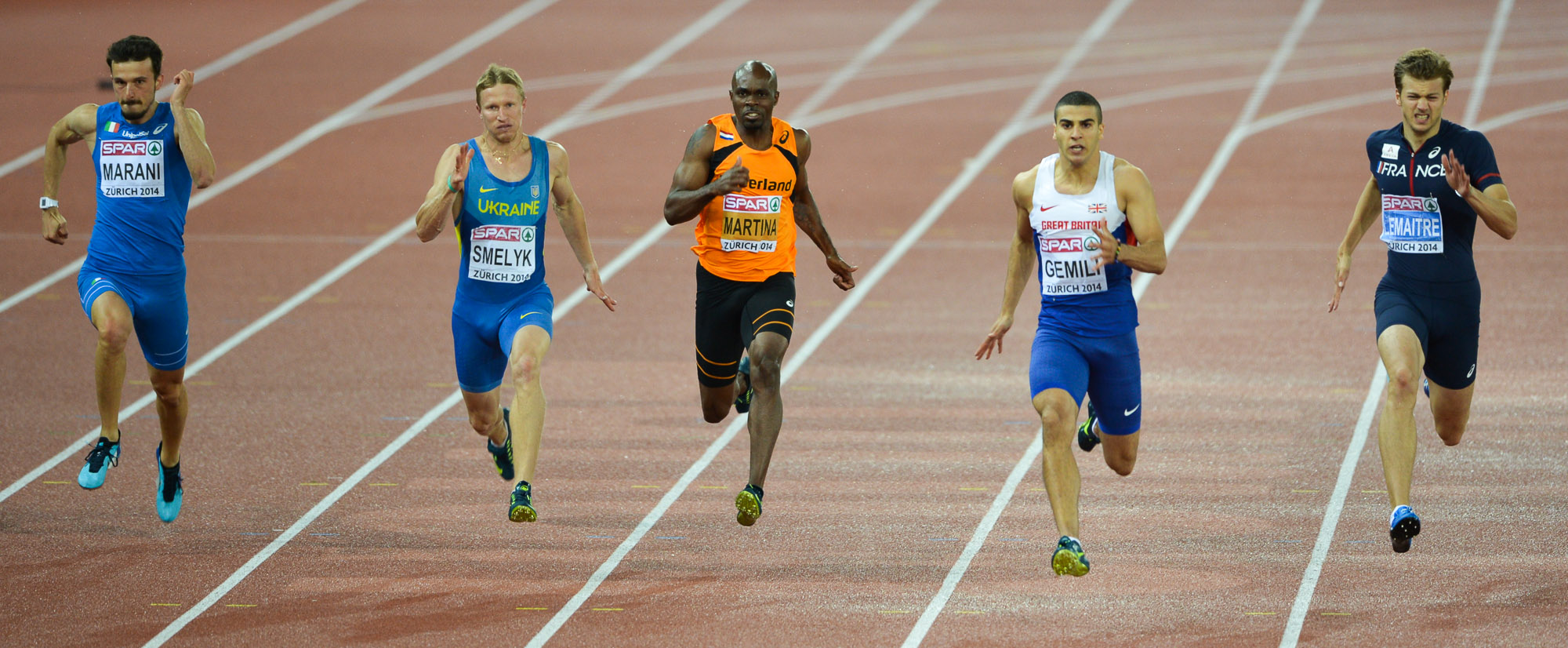
The final

Rank	Lane	Athlete	Nation	Time	Notes
1st place, gold medalist(s)	4	Adam Gemili	Great Britain	19.98	EL
2nd place, silver medalist(s)	3	Christophe Lemaitre	France	20.15	
3rd place, bronze medalist(s)	6	Serhiy Smelyk	Ukraine	20.30	PB
4	5	Churandy Martina	Netherlands	20.37	SB
5	7	Diego Marani	Italy	20.43	
6	1	Ramil Guliyev	Turkey	20.48	
7	8	Lykourgos-Stefanos Tsakonas	Greece	20.53	
8	2	Karol Zalewski	Poland	20.58	
				Wind: -1.6 m/s	
