= Susana Clement =

Cuban track and field athlete

Personal information
- Full name: Susana Aylen Clement Quezada
- Nationality: Cuba
- Born: 18 August 1989 (age 36) Diez de Octubre, Havana, Cuba
- Height: 1.73 m (5 ft 8 in)
- Weight: 68 kg (150 lb)

Sport
- Sport: Athletics
- Event: 4×400 m relay
Medal record
Women's athletics
Representing Cuba
Pan American Games
Gold medal – first place	2011 Guadalajara	4×400 m relay
CAC Championships
Gold medal – first place	2009 Havana	4×400 m relay
- Updated on 10 June 2013

Susana Aylen Clement Quezada (born August 18, 1989) is a Cuban track and field athlete, who specialized in the 400 metres. She won gold medals for the national relay team at the 2009 Central American and Caribbean Championships in Havana, and also, at the 2011 Pan American Games in Guadalajara, Mexico.

== Career ==
Clement competed for the women's 4 × 400 m relay at the 2008 Summer Olympics in Beijing, along with her teammates Roxana Díaz, Zulia Calatayud, and Indira Terrero. She ran on the third leg of the first heat, with an individual-split time of 51.38 seconds. She and her team finished the relay in second place for a seasonal best time of 3:25.48, giving them a qualifying slot for the final round. By the following day, Clement and her team placed sixth in the finals, with a national record-breaking time of 3:23.31.

== Personal best ==
- 200 m: 23.28 s (wind: +0.0 m/s) – Camagüey, Cuba, 14 March 2009
- 400 m: 52.24 s – Havana, Cuba, 26 May 2007

== Achievements ==
Year	Competition	Venue	Position	Event	Notes
Representing Cuba
2007	ALBA Games	Caracas, Venezuela	2nd	400 m	53.15 s
2007	ALBA Games	Caracas, Venezuela	1st	4 × 400 m relay	3:38.77 min
2007	Pan American Junior Championships	São Paulo, Brazil	5th	200 m	23.82 s (wind: +0.5 m/s)
2008	World Junior Championships	Bydgoszcz, Poland	3rd	400 m	52.36 s
2008	Olympic Games	Beijing, China	6th	4 × 400 m relay	3:23.21 min NR
2009	Central American and Caribbean Championships	Havana, Cuba	1st	4 × 400 m relay	3:29.94 min
2009	World Championships	Berlin, Germany	5th (h)	4 × 400 m relay	3:27.36 min
2010	Ibero-American Championships	San Fernando, Spain	1st	4 × 400 m relay	3:30.73 min
2011	ALBA Games	Barquisimeto, Venezuela	1st	4 × 400 m relay	3:34.91 min
2011	World Championships	Daegu, South Korea	4th (h)	4 × 400 m relay	3:26.74 min
2011	Pan American Games	Guadalajara, Mexico	1st	4 × 400 m relay	3:28.09 min A
