= Czech Republic at the 2014 European Athletics Championships =

- WA code: CZE
- National federation: Český atletický svaz (ČAS)
- Website: www.atletika.cz

in Zürich
- Competitors: 42
- Medals: Gold 1 Silver 1 Bronze 2 Total 4

European Athletics Championships appearances
- 1994; 1998; 2002; 2006; 2010; 2012; 2014; 2016; 2018; 2022; 2024; 2026

Other related appearances
- Czechoslovakia (1934–1990)

Czech Republic is competing at the 2014 European Athletics Championships in Zürich, Switzerland, from 12–17 August 2014. A delegation of 42 athletes were sent to represent the country.

== Medals ==
Medal	Name	Event	Date
Gold	Barbora Špotáková	Women's javelin throw	14 August
Silver	Vítězslav Veselý	Men's javelin throw	17 August
Bronze	Anežka Drahotová	Women's 20 kilometres walk	14 August
Bronze	Jan Kudlička	Men's pole vault	16 August

== Results ==
=== Men ===
==== Track ====
Event	Athletes	Heats		Semifinal		Final	
Event	Athletes	Result	Rank	Result	Rank	Result	Rank
100 m	Jan Veleba	10.41	19 q	10.38	13	did not advance	
400 m	Daniel Němeček	46.36	27	did not advance			
400 m	Patrik Šorm	46.61	26	did not advance			
400 m	Jan Tesař	46.65	30	did not advance			
1500 m	Jakub Holuša	3:39.64	7 q	—N/a			
110 m hurdles	Petr Svoboda	13.50	12 Q	13.39	6 q	13.63	5
400 m hurdles	Michal Brož	49.90	11 Q	50.39	17	did not advance	
4 × 400 m relay	Michal Brož; Michal Desenský; Daniel Němeček; Patrik Šorm; Jan Tesař	3:04.07	8 q	—N/a			
50 kilometres walk	Lukáš Gdula	—N/a				4:08:51	26
50 kilometres walk	Pavel Schrom	—N/a				DNF	

==== Field ====
Event	Athletes	Qualification		Final	
Event	Athletes	Result	Rank	Result	Rank
High jump	Jaroslav Bába	2.23	1 Q	2.30	4
Pole vault	Jan Kudlička	5.60	2 q	5.70	3rd place, bronze medalist(s)
Pole vault	Michal Balner	5.30	20	did not advance	
Shot put	Jan Marcell	20.09	8 q	20.48	6
Shot put	Ladislav Prášil	19.83	13	did not advance	
Shot put	Tomáš Staněk	19.67	14	did not advance	
Javelin throw	Petr Frydrych	75.19	19	did not advance	
Javelin throw	Vítězslav Veselý	80.00	7 q	84.79	2nd place, silver medalist(s)
Javelin throw	Jakub Vadlejch	75.14	20	did not advance	
Hammer throw	Lukáš Melich	73.48	13	did not advance	

Combined events – Decathlon

Athlete	Event	100 m	LJ	SP	HJ	400 m	110H	DT	PV	JT	1500 m	Final	Rank
Adam Helcelet	Result	11.12	7.34	14.90	1.98	50.07	14.39	39.75	4.60	65.32	4:44.33	7955	11
Adam Helcelet	Points	834	896	784	785	811	925	659	790	818	653	7955	11
Marek Lukáš	Result	11.19	6.96	13.50	1.92	50.22	14.67	39.55	4.50	65.84	4:41.16	7660	16
Marek Lukáš	Points	819	804	698	731	804	890	655	760	826	673	7660	16
Jiří Sýkora	Result	11.13	7.02	13.66	DNS	DNS	DNS	DNS	DNS	DNS	DNS	DNF	
Jiří Sýkora	Points	832	818	708								DNF	

=== Women ===
==== Track ====
Event	Athletes	Heats		Semifinal		Final	
Event	Athletes	Result	Rank	Result	Rank	Result	Rank
800 m	Lenka Masná	2:01.73	7 q	2:01.80	13	did not advance	
1500 m	Diana Mezuliáníková	4:15.40	18	—N/a		did not advance	
5000 m	Kristiina Mäki	—N/a				15:57.13	14
10000 m	Lucie Sekanová	—N/a				33:57.29	14
100 m hurdles	Lucie Škrobáková	13.29	26	did not advance			
100 m hurdles	Lucie Koudelová	DNF		did not advance			
400 m hurdles	Denisa Rosolová	56.13	4 Q	54.96	3 Q	54.70	4
20 kilometres walk	Anežka Drahotová	—N/a				1:28:08	3rd place, bronze medalist(s)
20 kilometres walk	Lucie Pelantová	—N/a				DNF	

==== Field ====
Event	Athletes	Qualification		Final	
Event	Athletes	Result	Rank	Result	Rank
High jump	Eliška Klučinová	DNS		did not advance	
Pole vault	Romana Maláčová	4.25	17	did not advance	
Pole vault	Jiřina Ptáčníková	4.45	1 Q	4.45	6
Pole vault	Rebeka Šilhanová	NM		did not advance	
Discus throw	Jitka Kubelová	53.82	12 q	50.54	12
Discus throw	Eliška Staňková	55.79	9 q	55.88	10
Hammer throw	Kateřina Šafránková	67.26	11 q	64.94	9
Hammer throw	Tereza Králová	NM		did not advance	
Javelin throw	Petra Andrejsková	56.10	14	did not advance	
Javelin throw	Nikola Ogrodníková	53.15	20	did not advance	
Javelin throw	Barbora Špotáková	59.99	4 Q	64.41	1st place, gold medalist(s)

Combined events – Heptathlon

Athlete	Event	100H	HJ	SP	200 m	LJ	JT	800 m	Final	Rank
Eliška Klučinová	Result	14.40	DNS	DNS	DNS	DNS	DNS	DNS	DNF	
Eliška Klučinová	Points	923							DNF	
