= Olha Zemlyak =

Ukrainian sprinter (born 1990)

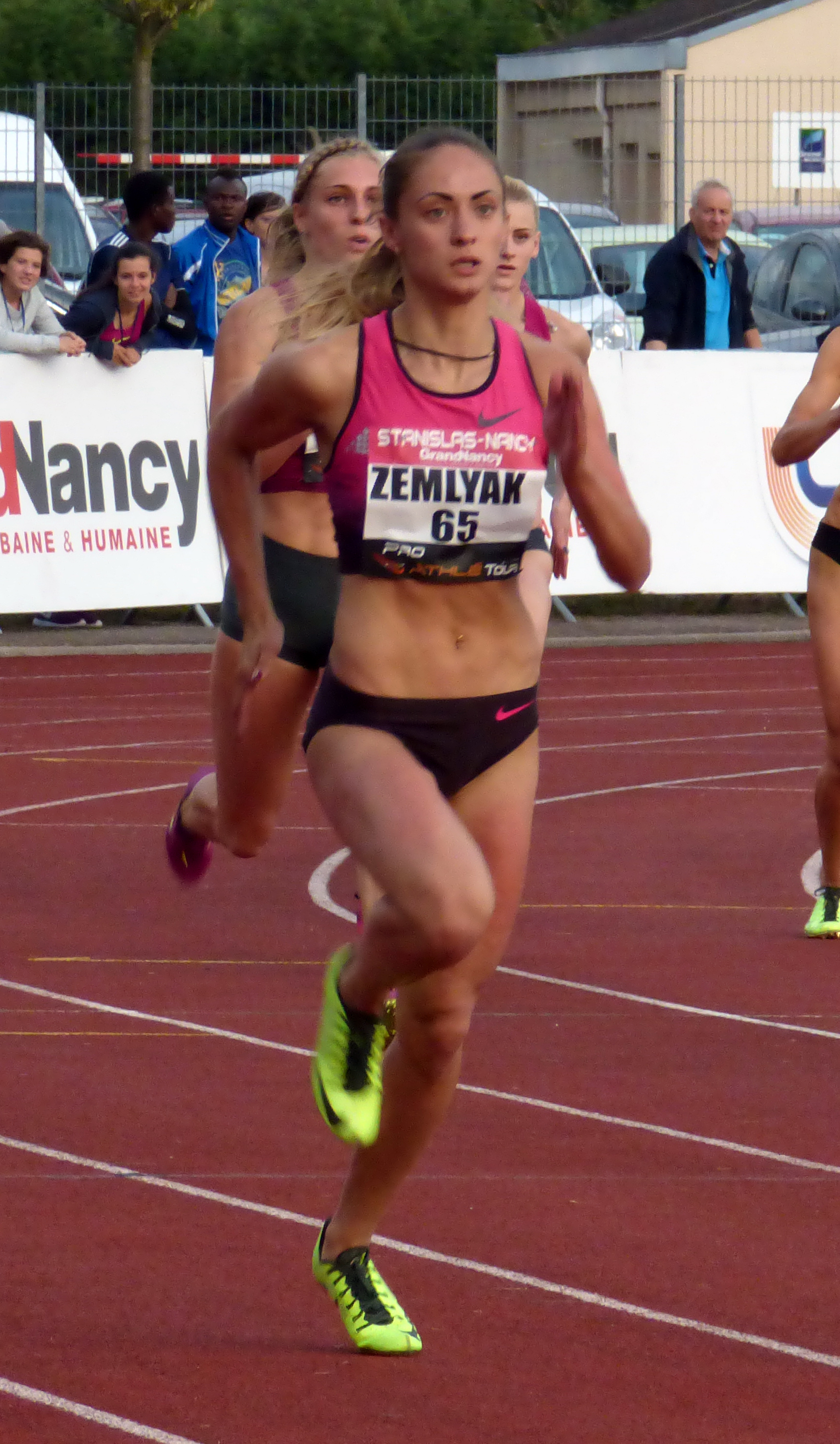
- Zemlyak in 2014

Personal information
- Born: 16 January 1990 (age 36) Rivne, Ukrainian SSR, Soviet Union
- Height: 1.65 m (5 ft 5 in)
- Weight: 55 kg (121 lb)

Sport
- Country: Ukraine
- Sport: Athletics
- Event: Sprint
Medal record
Olympic Games
Bronze medal – third place	2012 London	4 × 400 m relay
European Championships
Gold medal – first place	2012 Helsinki	4 × 400 m relay
Silver medal – second place	2014 Zürich	400 m
Silver medal – second place	2014 Zürich	4 × 400 m relay
European Team Championships
Gold medal – first place	2014 Braunschweig	4 × 400 m relay
Disqualified	2017 Lille	400 m
Silver medal – second place	2017 Lille	4 × 400 m relay
Bronze medal – third place	2014 Braunschweig	400 m
Bronze medal – third place	2015 Cheboksary	4 × 400 m relay
Military World Games
Silver medal – second place	2015 Mungyeong	4 × 400 m relay
World Junior Championships
Silver medal – second place	2008 Bydgoszcz	4 × 400 m relay
European Youth Olympic Festival
Bronze medal – third place	2007 Belgrade	400 m

Olha Zemlyak (Ukrainian: Ольга Миколаївна Земляк; born 16 January 1990) is a Ukrainian athlete who competes in the sprint.

== Career ==
Zemlyak won the gold medal with Ukraine at the 2012 European Athletics Championships in Helsinki in the 4 × 400 metres relay.

=== Doping suspensions ===
Zemlyak tested positive for norandrosterone at the 2009 European Athletics Junior Championships and was subsequently banned from sports for two years. Her results from the championships were annulled, and Ukraine lost the 4 × 400 metre relay gold. The competition ban ended 24 August 2011.

Zemlyak then tested positive again on the eve of the 2017 World Championships in Athletics and was suspended from competing in the championships.

In March 2019, the CAS confirmed that Zemlyak committed the anti-doping rule infractions and confirmed the UAF Executive Committee decisions about disqualification of Zemlyak for eight years starting from 5 July 2016. Her results at the 2016 Olympic Games were annulled.

== Competition record ==
Year	Competition	Venue	Position	Event	Notes
Representing Ukraine
2008	World Junior Championships	Bydgoszcz, Poland	18th (sf)	400 m	54.66
2008	World Junior Championships	Bydgoszcz, Poland	2nd	4 × 400 m relay	3:34.20
2009	European Junior Championships	Novi Sad, Serbia	DSQ (4th)	400 m	(54.46) Doping
2009	European Junior Championships	Novi Sad, Serbia	DSQ (1st)	4 × 400 m relay	(3:35.82) Doping
2012	European Championships	Helsinki, Finland	4th	400 m	52.01
2012	European Championships	Helsinki, Finland	1st	4 × 400 m relay	3:25.07 (EL)
2012	Olympic Games	London, United Kingdom	3rd	4 × 400 m relay	3:23.57
2014	European Team Championships	Braunschweig, Germany	3rd	400 m	52.28
2014	European Team Championships	Braunschweig, Germany	1st	4 × 400 m relay	3:27.66
2014	European Championships	Zürich, Switzerland	2nd	400 m	51.36
2014	European Championships	Zürich, Switzerland	2nd	4 × 400 m relay	3:24.32
2015	World Championships	Beijing, China	27th (h)	400 m	52.00
2015	World Championships	Beijing, China	5th	4 × 400 m relay	3:25.94
2016	European Championships	Amsterdam, Netherlands	14th (sf)	400 m	52.58
2016	European Championships	Amsterdam, Netherlands	6th	4 × 400 m relay	3:27.64
2016	Olympic Games	Rio de Janeiro, Brazil	DSQ (7th)	400 m	51.24
2016	Olympic Games	Rio de Janeiro, Brazil	DSQ (5th)	4 × 400 m relay	3:26.64
