= David Lima =

Portuguese sprinter (born 1990)

Personal information
- Full name: David Gerson Semedo Neves Lima
- Born: 6 September 1990 (age 35) Lisbon, Portugal
- Education: Coventry University
- Height: 1.86 m (6 ft 1 in)
- Weight: 75 kg (165 lb)

Sport
- Sport: Athletics
- Event: 100 metres 200 metres
- Club: Benfica
- Coached by: Linford Christie

David Gerson Semedo Neves Lima (born 6 September 1990) is a Portuguese athlete competing in sprinting events. He has represented Portugal at two European Championships and one World Championships. At club level, he competes for S.L. Benfica.

== International competitions ==
| Year | Competition | Venue | Position | Event | Notes |
Representing Portugal
| 2013 | Universiade | Kazan, Russia | 14th (qf) | 200 m | 21.10^{1} |
| 2014 | European Championships | Zürich, Switzerland | 26th (h) | 200 m | 21.25 |
| 2015 | IAAF World Relays | Nassau, Bahamas | 18th (h) | 4 × 100 m relay | 39.42 |
| 2015 | Universiade | Gwangju, South Korea | 6th (sf) | 200 m | 21.01 |
| 2016 | Ibero-American Championships | Rio de Janeiro, Brazil | 7th | 200 m | 20.88 |
| 2016 | European Championships | Amsterdam, Netherlands | 14th (sf) | 200 m | 20.86 |
| 2016 | European Championships | Amsterdam, Netherlands | 12th (h) | 4 × 100 m relay | 39.51 |
| 2017 | World Championships | London, United Kingdom | 37th (h) | 100 m | 10.41 |
| 2017 | World Championships | London, United Kingdom | 13th (sf) | 200 m | 20.56 |
| 2018 | Mediterranean Games | Tarragona, Spain | 8th | 200 m | 21.54 |

^{1}Did not start in the semifinals

== Personal bests ==
Outdoor

- 100 metres – 10.05 (2.0 m/s, Madrid 2017)
- 200 metres – 20.30 (0.6 m/s, La Chaux du Fonds 2017)

Indoor

- 200 metres – 21.19 (Sheffield 2016)
