= Athletics at the 2015 Summer Universiade – Men's 200 metres =

Men's 200 metres event at the 2015 Summer Universiade

The men's 200 metres event at the 2015 Summer Universiade was held on the 9th and 10th of July 2015 at the Gwangju Universiade Main Stadium.

== Medalists ==
Gold	Silver	Bronze
Hua Wilfried Koffi; Ivory Coast	Bryce Robinson; United States	Ramil Guliyev; Turkey

== Results ==
=== Heats ===
Qualification: First 3 in each heat (Q) and next 5 fastest (q) qualified for the quarterfinals.

Wind:
Heat 1: +1.6 m/s, Heat 2: +0.8 m/s, Heat 3: +0.9 m/s, Heat 4: +0.5 m/s, Heat 5: +0.3 m/s, Heat 6: +0.3 m/s, Heat 7: -0.1 m/s, Heat 8: +1.2 m/s, Heat 9: 0.0 m/s

Rank	Heat	Name	Nationality	Time	Notes
1	8	Davide Manenti	Italy	20.82	Q
2	1	Kotaro Taniguchi	Japan	20.90	Q
3	8	Vyacheslav Kolesnichenko	Russia	21.00	Q
4	2	Ncincilili Titi	South Africa	21.03	Q
5	1	David Lima	Portugal	21.04	Q
6	7	Mobolade Ajomale	Canada	21.13	Q
7	2	Tom Kling Baptiste	Sweden	21.14	Q, SB
8	3	Drelan Bramwell	Canada	21.15	Q, SB
9	8	Ma Jingwei	China	21.20	Q, PB
10	6	Bryce Robinson	United States	21.21	Q
11	9	Yang Chun-han	Chinese Taipei	21.23	Q
12	7	Takuya Nagata	Japan	21.25	Q
13	9	Ramil Guliyev	Turkey	21.30	Q
14	9	Jeffrey Vanan	Suriname	21.30	Q, PB
15	7	Andrew McCabe	Australia	21.33	Q
16	6	Emmanuel Appiah Kubi	Ghana	21.35	Q, SB
17	2	Leon Powell	United States	21.42	Q
17	3	Artur Zaczek	Poland	21.42	Q
19	7	Fallon Forde	Barbados	21.46	q, SB
20	3	Kostas Skrabulis	Lithuania	21.51	Q
21	4	Hua Wilfried Koffi	Ivory Coast	21.54	Q
22	9	Gerren Muwishi	Zimbabwe	21.55	q, PB
23	2	Ayotoluwafunmi Agusto	Nigeria	21.57	q
23	6	Eckhardt Rossouw	South Africa	21.57	Q
25	5	Ben Jaworski	Australia	21.61	Q
26	3	Jonathan Nyepa	Malaysia	21.63	q, SB
27	4	Carl Kaashagen	Norway	21.65	Q, SB
28	4	Artur Reysbikh	Russia	21.66	Q
29	7	Park Chan-yang	South Korea	21.67	q
30	6	Thabo Motsokono	Botswana	21.70	
31	2	Markus Ellisaar	Estonia	21.81	
31	9	Oeyvind Kjerpeset	Norway	21.81	
31	9	LeSean Noel	Trinidad and Tobago	21.81	
34	1	Leonel Bonon	Dominican Republic	21.82	Q
35	1	Kasper Olsen	Denmark	21.87	
36	3	Jakob Goroško	Estonia	21.88	
37	8	Leung King Hung	Hong Kong	21.89	PB
37	9	Nget Phearath	Cambodia	21.89	PB
39	5	Moulaye Sonko	Senegal	21.92	Q
39	6	Godwin Byamukama	Uganda	21.92	
41	3	Elorm Amenakpor	Ghana	21.93	PB
41	5	Choi Ho Sing	Hong Kong	21.93	Q
43	1	Lukas Gaudutis	Lithuania	21.99	
44	1	Rebeilwe Thwanyane	Botswana	22.00	
45	5	Yang Zhanlin	China	22.05	
46	2	Omirserik Bekenov	Kazakhstan	22.08	
47	4	Ali Rashid Al-Marjabi	Oman	22.09	
48	2	Emil Kaare Strom	Denmark	22.14	
49	4	Pius Adome	Uganda	22.45	
50	4	Godayalage Kularathna	Sri Lanka	22.51	SB
51	3	Charles Shimukowa	Zambia	22.54	
52	2	Luke Bezzina	Malta	22.59	
53	4	Jorge Oscar Caracassis	Argentina	22.65	
54	5	Ahac Moretti	Slovenia	22.68	PB
55	1	Mohammed Al-Maqbali	Oman	22.72	
56	4	Knight Chongo	Zambia	22.80	
57	1	Batnasan Batsukh	Mongolia	22.89	
58	3	Sofiane Nehal	Algeria	23.17	
59	8	Jervo Barroga	Philippines	23.85	
60	5	Irvine Kostka	Federated States of Micronesia	24.84	
61	7	Sameer Sameer	Afghanistan	26.56	
	5	Kim Kuk-young	South Korea	DNF	
	6	Bilal Sa'ada	Jordan	DQ	R163.3
	5	Alhaji Bah	Sierra Leone	DNS	
	6	Tega Odele	Nigeria	DNS	
	8	Jaran Sathoengram	Thailand	DNS	
	9	Jaran Barrie	Sierra Leone	DNS	

=== Quarterfinals ===
Qualification: First 3 in each heat (Q) and the next 4 fastest (q) qualified for the semifinals.

Wind:
Heat 1: -0.8 m/s, Heat 2: -1.5 m/s, Heat 3: -0.6 m/s, Heat 4: +0.4 m/s

Rank	Heat	Name	Nationality	Time	Notes
1	3	Ncincilili Titi	South Africa	20.84	Q
2	1	Hua Wilfried Koffi	Ivory Coast	20.93	Q
3	3	Ramil Guliyev	Turkey	20.95	Q
4	3	Bryce Robinson	United States	20.96	Q
5	1	Davide Manenti	Italy	21.01	Q
5	2	Vyacheslav Kolesnichenko	Russia	21.01	Q
7	4	Takuya Nagata	Japan	21.04	Q
8	1	Artur Reysbikh	Russia	21.05	Q
9	3	David Lima	Portugal	21.06	q
10	1	Ben Jaworski	Australia	21.09	q
10	2	Kotaro Taniguchi	Japan	21.09	Q
12	4	Mobolade Ajomale	Canada	21.13	Q
13	4	Yang Chun-han	Chinese Taipei	21.16	Q
14	2	Leon Powell	United States	21.20	Q
15	4	Tom Kling Baptiste	Sweden	21.20	q
16	1	Artur Zaczek	Poland	21.28	
17	2	Drelan Bramwell	Canada	21.28	q
18	4	Jeffrey Vanan	Suriname	21.30	
19	2	Emmanuel Appiah Kubi	Ghana	21.35	
20	1	Park Chan-yang	South Korea	21.56	
20	3	Ayotoluwafunmi Agusto	Nigeria	21.56	
22	3	Ma Jingwei	China	21.58	
23	3	Kostas Skrabulis	Lithuania	21.73	
23	4	Andrew McCabe	Australia	21.73	
25	1	Carl Kaashagen	Norway	21.77	
25	2	Jonathan Nyepa	Malaysia	21.77	
27	2	Moulaye Sonko	Senegal	21.82	
28	1	Eckhardt Rossouw	South Africa	21.97	
29	3	Choi Ho Sing	Hong Kong	22.02	
30	4	Fallon Forde	Barbados	22.08	
31	2	Leonel Bonon	Dominican Republic	22.28	
	4	Gerren Muwishi	Zimbabwe	DNS	

=== Semifinals ===
Qualification: First 4 in each heat (Q) qualified for the final.

Wind:
Heat 1: -0.2 m/s, Heat 2: -0.4 m/s

Rank	Heat	Name	Nationality	Time	Notes
1	2	Bryce Robinson	United States	20.60	Q
2	2	Ramil Guliyev	Turkey	20.68	Q
3	2	Ncincilili Titi	South Africa	20.73	Q
4	2	Takuya Nagata	Japan	20.90	Q
5	1	Hua Wilfried Koffi	Ivory Coast	20.96	Q
6	2	David Lima	Portugal	21.01	
7	2	Artur Reysbikh	Russia	21.03	
8	1	Davide Manenti	Italy	21.08	Q
9	1	Kotaro Taniguchi	Japan	21.15	Q
10	1	Ben Jaworski	Australia	21.17	Q
11	1	Vyacheslav Kolesnichenko	Russia	21.27	
11	2	Mobolade Ajomale	Canada	21.27	
13	2	Tom Kling Baptiste	Sweden	21.30	
14	1	Leon Powell	United States	21.37	
15	1	Yang Chun-han	Chinese Taipei	21.37	
16	1	Drelan Bramwell	Canada	21.52	

=== Final ===
Wind: -2.5 m/s

Official Video

Rank	Lane	Name	Nationality	Time	Notes
1st place, gold medalist(s)	5	Hua Wilfried Koffi	Ivory Coast	20.41	SB
2nd place, silver medalist(s)	6	Bryce Robinson	United States	20.51	
3rd place, bronze medalist(s)	3	Ramil Guliyev	Turkey	20.59	SB
4	7	Ncincilili Titi	South Africa	20.68	SB
5	4	Davide Manenti	Italy	20.82	
6	1	Takuya Nagata	Japan	20.90	
7	8	Kotaro Taniguchi	Japan	21.17	
8	2	Ben Jaworski	Australia	21.26	
