= Joceline Monteiro =

Portuguese runner

Joceline Monteiro (born 10 May 1990 in Praia) is a Portuguese runner who specializes in the 400 and 800 metres.

She competed at the 2008 World Junior Championships (400 m) without reaching the final. Monteiro has also won individual national titles in 2010, 2011 and 2013.

In the 4 × 400 metres relay she won a silver medal at the 2009 Lusophony Games, finished sixth at the 2010 Ibero-American Championships, fifth at the 2011 European U23 Championships and won a gold medal at the 2018 Ibero-American Championships She also competed at the 2012 European Championships and the 2018 European Championships without reaching the final.

Her personal best times are 54.54 seconds, achieved in May 2009 in Lisbon; and 2:03.77 minutes, achieved in July 2016 in Solihull.
