= 2014 European Athletics Championships – Women's 800 metres =

Women's 800 metres at the European Athletics Championships
- Venue: Letzigrund
- Location: Zurich, Switzerland
- Dates: 13 August 2014 (round 1); 14 August 2014 (semi-finals); 16 August 2014 (final)
- Competitors: 30 from 21 nations
- Winning time: 1:58.15 min

Medalists
gold medal	Maryna Arzamasava	Belarus
silver medal	Lynsey Sharp	Great Britain
bronze medal	Joanna Jóźwik	Poland

The women's 800 metres at the 2014 European Athletics Championships was held over three rounds at the Letzigrund in Zurich, Switzerland, from 13 to 16 August 2014.

== Background ==
Records before to the 2014 European Athletics Championships
Record	Athlete (nation)	Time	Location	Date
World record	Jarmila Kratochvílová (TCH)	1:53.28	Munich, West Germany	26 July 1983
European record	Jarmila Kratochvílová (TCH)	1:53.28	Munich, West Germany	26 July 1983
Championship record	Olga Mineyeva (URS)	1:55.41	Athens, Greece	8 September 1982
World leading	Ajee' Wilson (USA)	1:57.67	Monaco	18 July 2014
European leading	Yekaterina Poistogova (RUS)	1:58.55	Sochi, Russia	30 May 2014

== Results ==
=== Round 1 ===
On 13 August 2014, twenty-nine athletes from twenty-one nations competed in the four heats of round 1, starting at 12:20 (UTC+2). Sixteen athletes, the first three athletes in each heat (Q) and the next four fastest athletes overall (q), qualified for the semi-finals.

Results of round 1
Rank	Heat	Lane	Athlete	Nation	Time	Note
1	1	5	Alison Leonard	Great Britain & N.I.	2:01.47	Q
2	4	4	Lynsey Sharp	Great Britain & N.I.	2:01.55	Q
3	2	4	Maryna Arzamasava	Belarus	2:01.56	Q
4	4	2	Vania Stambolova	Bulgaria	2:01.60	Q
5	4	8	Joanna Jóźwik	Poland	2:01.61	Q
5	1	6	Yekaterina Poistogova	Russia	2:01.61	Q
7	1	7	Lovisa Lindh	Sweden	2:01.73	Q, PB
7	4	1	Lenka Masná	Czech Republic	2:01.73	q
9	1	2	Justine Fedronic	France	2:02.01	q
10	1	4	Aníta Hinriksdóttir	Iceland	2:02.12	q, SB
11	2	8	Selina Büchel	Switzerland	2:02.14	Q
12	2	3	Jessica Judd	Great Britain & N.I.	2:02.30	Q
13	2	7	Trine Mjåland	Norway	2:02.62	q
14	2	6	Sanne Verstegen	Netherlands	2:02.73	
15	2	5	Mihaela Nunu	Romania	2:03.27	
16	4	6	Charline Mathias	Luxembourg	2:03.43	
17	3	2	Svetlana Rogozina	Russia	2:03.80	Q
18	3	4	Rénelle Lamote	France	2:03.92	Q
19	4	5	Florina Pierdevara	Romania	2:03.99	
20	3	3	Mirela Lavric	Romania	2:04.06	Q
21	3	7	Angelika Cichocka	Poland	2:04.41	
22	1	8	Hedda Hynne	Norway	2:05.08	
23	3	5	Marta Milani	Italy	2:05.64	
24	3	8	Anastasiya Tkachuk	Ukraine	2:06.89	
25	2	1	Liina Tšernov	Estonia	2:07.95	
26	4	7	Egle Balciunaite	Lithuania	2:08.05	
27	3	6	Khadija Rahmouni	Spain	2:08.09	
28	4	3	Tugba Koyuncu	Turkey	2:09.05	
29	2	2	Kim Baglietto	Gibraltar	2:24.47	
	1	3	Federica Del Buono	Italy	DNS	

=== Semi-finals ===
On 14 August 2014, sixteen athletes from twelve nations competed in the two heats of the semi-finals, starting at 18:38 (UTC+2). Eight athletes, the first three athletes in each heat (Q) and the next two fastest athletes overall (q), qualified for the final.

Results of the semi-finals
Rank	Heat	Lane	Athlete	Nation	Time	Note
1	1	5	Maryna Arzamasava	Belarus	2:00.36	Q
2	1	7	Joanna Jóźwik	Poland	2:00.58	Q, PB
3	1	4	Svetlana Rogozina	Russia	2:00.83	Q
4	1	2	Mirela Lavric	Romania	2:01.24	q, SB
5	2	3	Lynsey Sharp	Great Britain & N.I.	2:01.32	Q
6	2	4	Yekaterina Poistogova	Russia	2:01.45	Q
7	2	5	Jessica Judd	Great Britain & N.I.	2:01.53	Q
8	1	8	Vania Stambolova	Bulgaria	2:01.59	q
9	2	8	Selina Büchel	Switzerland	2:01.80	
9	2	6	Lenka Masná	Czech Republic	2:01.80	
11	1	1	Aníta Hinriksdóttir	Iceland	2:02.45	
12	2	1	Lovisa Lindh	Sweden	2:02.60	
13	1	6	Rénelle Lamote	France	2:03.90	
14	2	2	Trine Mjåland	Norway	2:03.92	
15	2	7	Justine Fedronic	France	2:04.39	
	1	3	Alison Leonard	Great Britain & N.I.	DNF	

=== Final ===
On 16 August 2014, eight athletes from six nations competed in the final at 16:05 (UTC+2).

Results of the final
Rank	Lane	Athlete	Nation	Time	Note
1st place, gold medalist(s)	5	Maryna Arzamasava	Belarus	1:58.15	EL
2nd place, silver medalist(s)	6	Lynsey Sharp	Great Britain & N.I.	1:58.80	PB
3rd place, bronze medalist(s)	8	Joanna Jóźwik	Poland	1:59.63	PB
4	3	Yekaterina Poistogova	Russia	1:59.69	
5	4	Svetlana Rogozina	Russia	2:00.76	
6	1	Vania Stambolova	Bulgaria	2:00.91	PB
7	7	Jessica Judd	Great Britain & N.I.	2:01.65	
8	2	Mirela Lavric	Romania	2:09.25	
