= 2008 World Junior Championships in Athletics – Women's 400 metres =

The women's 400 metres event at the 2008 World Junior Championships in Athletics was held in Bydgoszcz, Poland, at Zawisza Stadium on 8, 9 and 10 July.

== Medalists ==
Gold	Shade Abugan; Nigeria
Silver	Jessica Beard; United States
Bronze	Susana Clement; Cuba

== Results ==
=== Final ===
10 July

Rank	Name	Nationality	Time	Notes
1st place, gold medalist(s)	Shade Abugan	Nigeria	51.84	
2nd place, silver medalist(s)	Jessica Beard	United States	52.09	
3rd place, bronze medalist(s)	Susana Clement	Cuba	52.36	
4	Racheal Nachula	Zambia	52.44	
5	Yuliya Baraley	Ukraine	53.18	
6	Angeline Blackburn	Australia	53.43	
7	Lanie Whittaker	United States	53.98	
8	Fabienne Kohlmann	Germany	54.12	

=== Semifinals ===
9 July

==== Semifinal 1 ====
Rank	Name	Nationality	Time	Notes
1	Shade Abugan	Nigeria	51.92	Q
2	Angeline Blackburn	Australia	52.90	Q
3	Lanie Whittaker	United States	53.61	q
4	Moa Hjelmer	Sweden	54.12	
5	Latoya McDermott	Jamaica	54.15	
6	Aleksandra Bulanova	Russia	54.18	
7	Alyssa Johnson	Canada	55.86	
	Britney St. Louis	Trinidad and Tobago	DQ	IAAF rule 163.3

==== Semifinal 2 ====
Rank	Name	Nationality	Time	Notes
1	Susana Clement	Cuba	52.90	Q
2	Racheal Nachula	Zambia	52.95	Q
3	Fabienne Kohlmann	Germany	53.78	q
4	Natália Zsigovics	Hungary	54.15	
5	Meliz Redif	Turkey	54.29	
6	Natalie Geiger	Canada	54.50	
7	Olha Zemlyak	Ukraine	54.66	
8	Mara Weekes	Barbados	55.61	

==== Semifinal 3 ====
Rank	Name	Nationality	Time	Notes
1	Jessica Beard	United States	52.59	Q
2	Yuliya Baraley	Ukraine	53.48	Q
3	Olesea Cojuhari	Moldova	53.80	
4	Berenice Manimba	France	53.85	
5	Liliya Gafiyatullina	Russia	54.17	
6	Chantel Malone	British Virgin Islands	54.98	
7	Josefin Magnusson	Sweden	55.34	
	Karla Dueñas	Mexico	DQ	IAAF rule 163.3

=== Heats ===
8 July

==== Heat 1 ====
Rank	Name	Nationality	Time	Notes
1	Yuliya Baraley	Ukraine	54.61	Q
2	Lanie Whittaker	United States	54.74	Q
3	Moa Hjelmer	Sweden	55.32	Q
4	Mara Weekes	Barbados	55.34	Q
5	Antonique Campbell	Jamaica	56.27	
6	Alexandra Štuková	Slovakia	56.33	
7	Joceline Monteiro	Portugal	56.57	
8	Martina Xuereb	Malta	56.84	

==== Heat 2 ====
Rank	Name	Nationality	Time	Notes
1	Shade Abugan	Nigeria	53.71	Q
2	Fabienne Kohlmann	Germany	53.85	Q
3	Natália Zsigovics	Hungary	54.67	Q
4	Karla Dueñas	Mexico	54.90	Q
5	Josefin Magnusson	Sweden	54.93	q
6	Olha Zemlyak	Ukraine	55.12	q
7	Mihaela Nunu	Romania	56.01	

==== Heat 3 ====
Rank	Name	Nationality	Time	Notes
1	Racheal Nachula	Zambia	52.65	Q
2	Susana Clement	Cuba	53.85	Q
3	Berenice Manimba	France	54.16	Q
4	Aleksandra Bulanova	Russia	54.38	Q
5	Latoya McDermott	Jamaica	54.62	q
6	Alyssa Johnson	Canada	55.66	q
7	Julia Müller-Foell	Germany	55.99	
8	Francesca Xuereb	Malta	56.33	

==== Heat 4 ====
Rank	Name	Nationality	Time	Notes
1	Jessica Beard	United States	53.65	Q
2	Olesea Cojuhari	Moldova	54.56	Q
3	Meliz Redif	Turkey	54.91	Q
4	Natalie Geiger	Canada	55.13	Q
5	Valeria Palacios	Mexico	56.07	
6	Benedikte Hauge	Norway	56.08	
7	Yen Tai-Ting	Chinese Taipei	57.52	
8	Machettira Poovamma	India	57.94	

==== Heat 5 ====
Rank	Name	Nationality	Time	Notes
1	Angeline Blackburn	Australia	53.82	Q
2	Britney St. Louis	Trinidad and Tobago	54.67	Q
3	Liliya Gafiyatullina	Russia	54.95	Q
4	Chantel Malone	British Virgin Islands	55.38	Q
5	Floria Gueï	France	55.74	
6	Florina Rusu	Romania	57.12	
7	Oslyn Collins	Guyana	61.20	
	Rania Al-Qebali	Jordan	DQ	IAAF rule 163.3

== Participation ==
According to an unofficial count, 39 athletes from 28 countries participated in the event.

- Australia (1)
- Barbados (1)
- British Virgin Islands (1)
- Canada (2)
- Chinese Taipei (1)
- Cuba (1)
- France (2)
- Germany (2)
- Guyana (1)
- Hungary (1)
- India (1)
- Jamaica (2)
- Jordan (1)
- Malta (2)
- Mexico (2)
- Moldova (1)
- Nigeria (1)
- Norway (1)
- Portugal (1)
- Romania (2)
- Russia (2)
- Slovakia (1)
- Sweden (2)
- Trinidad and Tobago (1)
- Turkey (1)
- Ukraine (2)
- United States (2)
- Zambia (1)
