= Diego Marani (athlete) =

Italian sprinter (born 1990)

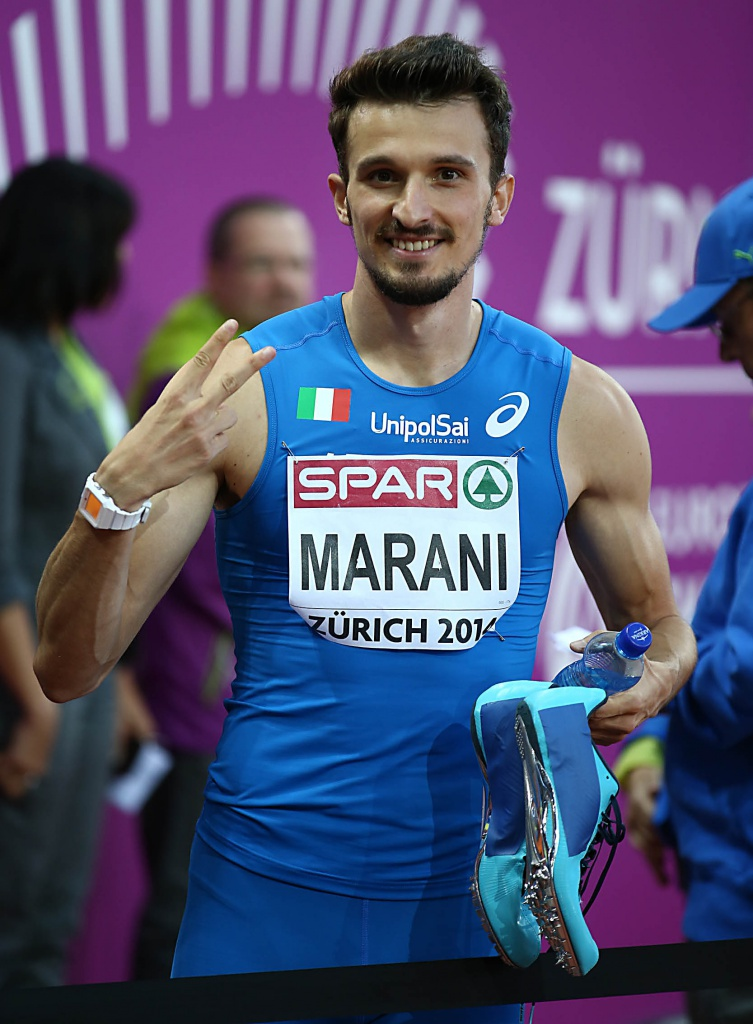
- Marani in 2014

Personal information
- Nationality: Italian
- Born: 27 April 1990 (age 36) Asola, Italy
- Height: 1.86 m (6 ft 1 in)
- Weight: 72 kg (159 lb)

Sport
- Country: Italy
- Sport: Athletics
- Event: Sprint
- Club: G.S. Fiamme Gialle
- Coached by: Giovanni Grazioli

Achievements and titles
- Personal best: 200 m : 20.36 (2014)
Medal record
European Junior Championships
Bronze medal – third place	2009 Novi Sad	100 m

Diego Marani (born 27 April 1990 in Asola) is an Italian sprinter.

His best result at the international level was the 7th place, in the 200 metres final, at the 2012 European Athletics Championships held in Helsinki.

== Biography ==
On 17 June 2012, in Misano Adriatico, he gets the pass, with his personal best of 20.77, for 2012 European Athletics Championships.

== Achievements ==
Year	Competition	Venue	Position	Event	time	Notes
Representing Italy
2008	World Junior Championships	(Poland) Bydgoszcz	9th (sf)	200m	21.23 (wind: -0.1 m/s)	
2008	World Junior Championships	(Poland) Bydgoszcz	9th (h)	4 × 100 m relay	40.41	
2009	European Junior Championships	Novi Sad, Serbia	3rd	200 metres	21.03	
2011	European U23 Championships	(Czech Republic) Ostrava	18th (h)	200m	21.53 (wind: -0.7 m/s)	
2012	European Championships	Helsinki, Finland	7th	200 metres	21.26	
2013	Mediterranean Games	(Turkey) Mersin	4th	200 metres	20.78	

== National titles ==
He has won two times the individual national championship.

- 2 wins in the 200 metres (2013, 2014)

== Progression ==
200 metres

Year	Performance	Venue	Date	World Rank
2014	20.36	(Switzerland) Zürich	14/08/2014	39th
2013	20.77	(Italy) Milan	28/07/2013	
2012	20.77	(Italy) Misano Adriatico	17/06/2012	
2010	20.91	(Italy) Rome	110/06/2010	
2009	20.98	(Italy) Rieti	114/06/2009	
2008	21.18	(Poland) Bydgoszcz	110/07/2008	

== See also ==
- Italian all-time lists – 200 metres
