= 2014 European Athletics Championships =

22nd European Athletics Championships
- Dates: 12–17 August
- Host city: Zürich, Switzerland
- Venue: Letzigrund
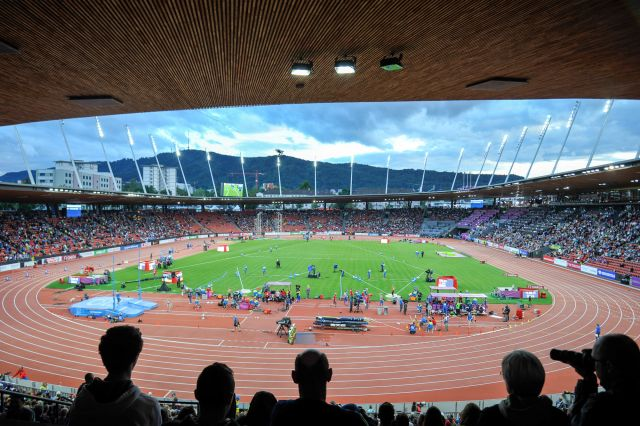
- Level: Senior
- Type: Outdoor
- Events: 47
- Participation: 1,439 athletes from 50 nations

The 2014 European Athletics Championships was held in Zürich, Switzerland, between 12 and 17 August 2014. It was the first time that Switzerland had hosted the European Athletics Championships since 1954.

Great Britain headed the medal table, with 12 gold medals, comfortably their best return from a European championships, despite winning only one field event medal. France, second on gold medals won with 9, won the most medals, 25.

== Event schedule ==
Legend
Key	P	Q	H	½	F
Value	Preliminary round	Qualifiers	Heats	Semifinals	Final

Men
Date	Aug 12		Aug 13			Aug 14			Aug 15		Aug 16		Aug 17	
Event	M	A	M	A		M	A		M	A	M	A	M	A
100 m		H		½	F									
200 m						H	½			F				
400 m	H			½						F				
800 m	H			½						F				
1500 m									H					F
5000 m									H					F
10,000 m				F										
Marathon													F	
110 m hurdles			H				½	F						
400 m hurdles	H			½						F				
3000 m steeplechase	H						F							
4 × 100 m relay												H		F
4 × 400 m relay												H		F
20 km walk			F											
50 km walk									F					
Long jump										Q				F
Triple jump	Q						F							
High jump			Q							F				
Pole vault						Q						F		
Shot put	Q	F												
Discus throw		Q		F										
Hammer throw						Q						F		
Javelin throw							Q							F
Decathlon	F													

Women
Date	Aug 12		Aug 13			Aug 14		Aug 15		Aug 16		Aug 17	
Event	M	A	M	A		M	A	M	A	M	A	M	A
100 m	H			½	F								
200 m						H	½		F				
400 m		H		½					F				
800 m			H				½				F		
1500 m	H								F				
5000 m						H					F		
10,000 m		F											
Marathon										F			
100 m hurdles	H	½		F									
400 m hurdles			H				½				F		
3000 m steeplechase								H					F
4 × 100 m relay											H		F
4 × 400 m relay											H		F
20 km walk						F							
—													
Long jump		Q		F									
Triple jump				Q							F		
High jump								Q					F
Pole vault	Q						F						
Shot put								Q					F
Discus throw								Q			F		
Hammer throw			Q						F				
Javelin throw	Q						F						
Heptathlon						F							

== Results ==
=== Men ===
==== Track ====
Chronology: 2010 | 2012 | 2014 | 2016 | 2018

Event	Gold		Silver		Bronze	
100 metres	James Dasaolu; Great Britain & N.I. (GBR)	10.06	Christophe Lemaitre; France (FRA)	10.13	Harry Aikines-Aryeetey; Great Britain & N.I. (GBR)	10.22
200 metres	Adam Gemili; Great Britain & N.I. (GBR)	19.98 EL	Christophe Lemaitre; France (FRA)	20.15	Serhiy Smelyk; Ukraine (UKR)	20.30 PB
400 metres	Martyn Rooney; Great Britain & N.I. (GBR)	44.71 EL	Matthew Hudson-Smith; Great Britain & N.I. (GBR)	44.75 PB	Donald Sanford; Israel (ISR)	45.27 NR
800 metres	Adam Kszczot; Poland (POL)	1:44.15 SB	Artur Kuciapski; Poland (POL)	1:44.89 PB	Mark English; Ireland (IRL)	1:45.03 =SB
1500 metres	Mahiedine Mekhissi-Benabbad; France (FRA)	3:45.60	Henrik Ingebrigtsen; Norway (NOR)	3:46.10	Chris O'Hare; Great Britain & N.I. (GBR)	3:46.18
5000 metres	Mo Farah; Great Britain & N.I. (GBR)	14:05.82	Hayle Ibrahimov; Azerbaijan (AZE)	14:08.32	Andy Vernon; Great Britain & N.I. (GBR)	14:09.48
10,000 metres	Mo Farah; Great Britain & N.I. (GBR)	28:08.11	Andy Vernon; Great Britain & N.I. (GBR)	28:08.66 SB	Ali Kaya; Turkey (TUR)	28:08.72 PB
Marathon	Daniele Meucci; Italy (ITA)	2:11:08	Yared Shegumo; Poland (POL)	2:12:00	Aleksey Reunkov; Russia (RUS)	2:12:15
110 metres hurdles	Sergey Shubenkov; Russia (RUS)	13.19	William Sharman; Great Britain & N.I. (GBR)	13.27	Pascal Martinot-Lagarde; France (FRA)	13.29
400 metres hurdles	Kariem Hussein; Switzerland (SUI)	48.96	Rasmus Mägi; Estonia (EST)	49.06	Denis Kudryavtsev; Russia (RUS)	49.16
3000 metres steeplechase^{[a]}	Yoann Kowal; France (FRA)	8:26.66	Krystian Zalewski; Poland (POL)	8:27.11	Ángel Mullera; Spain (ESP)	8:29.16
4 × 100 metres relay	Great Britain & N.I. Adam Gemili; Richard Kilty; Harry Aikines-Aryeetey; James Ellington; Daniel Talbot*	37.93 EL	Germany; Julian Reus; Sven Knipphals; Alexander Kosenkow; Lucas Jakubczyk	38.09 SB	France; Pierre Vincent; Christophe Lemaitre; Teddy Tinmar; Ben Bassaw	38.47
4 × 400 metres relay	Great Britain & N.I. Martyn Rooney; Michael Bingham; Conrad Williams; Matthew Hudson-Smith; Nigel Levine*; Rabah Yousif*	2:58.79 EL	Poland; Rafał Omelko; Kacper Kozłowski; Łukasz Krawczuk; Jakub Krzewina; Michał Pietrzak*; Andrzej Jaros*	2:59.85 SB	France; Mame-Ibra Anne; Teddy Atine-Venel; Mamoudou Hanne; Thomas Jordier	2:59.89 SB
20 kilometres walk	Miguel Ángel López; Spain (ESP)	1:19:44	Denis Strelkov; Russia (RUS)	1:19:46 PB	Ruslan Dmytrenko; Ukraine (UKR)	1:19:46
50 kilometres walk	Yohann Diniz; France (FRA)	3:32:33 WR	Matej Tóth; Slovakia (SVK)	3:36:21 NR	Ivan Noskov; Russia (RUS)	3:37:41
WR world record | ER European record | CR championship record | NR national record | WL world leading | EL European leading | PB personal best | SB seasonal best

(*) Heat only.

^{a} In the 3000m steeplechase, Mahiedine Mekhissi-Benabbad of France won the race, but he was later disqualified after he took off his shirt while running down the home straight. Yoann Kowal (France) was then awarded gold, Krystian Zalewski (Poland) silver and Angel Mullera (Spain) bronze.

==== Field ====
Chronology: 2010 | 2012 | 2014 | 2016 | 2018

Event	Gold		Silver		Bronze	
High jump	Bohdan Bondarenko; Ukraine (UKR)	2.35	Andriy Protsenko; Ukraine (UKR)	2.33	Jaroslav Bába; Czech Republic (CZE)	2.30
Pole vault	Renaud Lavillenie; France (FRA)	5.90	Paweł Wojciechowski; Poland (POL)	5.70	Jan Kudlička; Czech Republic (CZE); Kévin Menaldo; France (FRA)	5.70
Long jump	Greg Rutherford; Great Britain & N.I. (GBR)	8.29	Louis Tsatoumas; Greece (GRE)	8.15	Kafétien Gomis; France (FRA)	8.14
Triple jump	Benjamin Compaoré; France (FRA)	17.46 EL	Aleksey Fyodorov; Russia (RUS)	17.04	Yoann Rapinier; France (FRA)	17.01
Shot put	David Storl; Germany (GER)	21.41	Borja Vivas; Spain (ESP)	20.86	Tomasz Majewski; Poland (POL)	20.83
Discus throw	Robert Harting; Germany (GER)	66.07	Gerd Kanter; Estonia (EST)	64.75	Robert Urbanek; Poland (POL)	63.81
Javelin throw	Antti Ruuskanen; Finland (FIN)	88.01 EL, PB	Vítězslav Veselý; Czech Republic (CZE)	84.79	Tero Pitkämäki; Finland (FIN)	84.40
Hammer throw	Krisztián Pars; Hungary (HUN)	82.69 WL, PB	Paweł Fajdek; Poland (POL)	82.05	Pavel Kryvitski; Belarus (BLR)	78.50
Decathlon	Andrei Krauchanka; Belarus (BLR)	8616 WL	Kévin Mayer; France (FRA)	8521 PB	Ilya Shkurenyov; Russia (RUS)	8498 PB
WR world record | ER European record | CR championship record | NR national record | WL world leading | EL European leading | PB personal best | SB seasonal best

=== Women ===
==== Track ====
Chronology: 2010 | 2012 | 2014 | 2016 | 2018

Event	Gold		Silver		Bronze	
100 metres	Dafne Schippers; Netherlands (NED)	11.12	Myriam Soumaré; France (FRA)	11.16	Ashleigh Nelson; Great Britain & N.I. (GBR)	11.22
200 metres	Dafne Schippers; Netherlands (NED)	22.03 WL, NR	Jodie Williams; Great Britain & N.I. (GBR)	22.46 PB	Myriam Soumaré; France (FRA)	22.58
400 metres	Libania Grenot; Italy (ITA)	51.10	Olha Zemlyak; Ukraine (UKR)	51.36	Indira Terrero; Spain (ESP)	51.38 SB
800 metres	Maryna Arzamasava; Belarus (BLR)	1:58.15 EL	Lynsey Sharp; Great Britain & N.I. (GBR)	1:58.80 PB	Joanna Jóźwik; Poland (POL)	1:59.63 PB
1500 metres	Sifan Hassan; Netherlands (NED)	4:04.18	Abeba Aregawi; Sweden (SWE)	4:05.08	Laura Weightman; Great Britain & N.I. (GBR)	4:06.32
5000 metres	Meraf Bahta; Sweden (SWE)	15:31.39	Sifan Hassan; Netherlands (NED)	15:31.79	Susan Kuijken; Netherlands (NED)	15:32.82
10,000 metres	Joanne Pavey; Great Britain & N.I. (GBR)	32:22.39	Clémence Calvin; France (FRA)	32:23.58	Laila Traby; France (FRA)	32:26.03 PB
Marathon	Christelle Daunay; France (FRA)	2:25:14 CR	Valeria Straneo; Italy (ITA)	2:25:27	Jéssica Augusto; Portugal (POR)	2:25:41
100 metres hurdles	Tiffany Porter; Great Britain & N.I. (GBR)	12.76	Cindy Billaud; France (FRA)	12.79	Cindy Roleder; Germany (GER)	12.82 PB
400 metres hurdles	Eilidh Child; Great Britain & N.I. (GBR)	54.48	Anna Titimets; Ukraine (UKR)	54.56 PB	Denisa Rosolová; Czech Republic (CZE)	54.70
3000 metres steeplechase	Antje Möldner-Schmidt; Germany (GER)	9:29:43 SB	Charlotta Fougberg; Sweden (SWE)	9:30:16	Diana Martín; Spain (ESP)	9:30:70 PB
4 × 100 metres relay	Great Britain & N.I. Asha Philip; Ashleigh Nelson; Jodie Williams; Desirèe Henry; Anyika Onuora*	42.24 EL NR	France; Céline Distel-Bonnet; Ayodelé Ikuesan; Myriam Soumaré; Stella Akakpo	42.45	Russia; Marina Panteleyeva; Natalia Rusakova; Kristina Sivkova; Yelizaveta Savlinis; Yekaterina Vukolova*	43.22 SB
4 × 400 metres relay	France; Marie Gayot; Muriel Hurtis-Houairi; Agnès Raharolahy; Floria Gueï; Estelle Perrossier*; Phara Anacharsis*	3:24.27 EL	Ukraine; Nataliya Pyhyda; Hrystyna Stuy; Hanna Ryzhykova; Olha Zemlyak; Daryna Prystupa*; Olha Lyakhova*	3:24.32 SB	Great Britain & N.I. Eilidh Child; Kelly Massey; Shana Cox; Margaret Adeoye; Emily Diamond*; Victoria Ohuruogu*	3:24.34 SB
20 kilometres walk	Elmira Alembekova; Russia (RUS)	1:27:56	Lyudmyla Olyanovska; Ukraine (UKR)	1:28:07	Anežka Drahotová; Czech Republic (CZE)	1:28:08 NR
WR world record | ER European record | CR championship record | NR national record | WL world leading | EL European leading | PB personal best | SB seasonal best

(*) Heat only.

==== Field ====
Chronology: 2010 | 2012 | 2014 | 2016 | 2018

Event	Gold		Silver		Bronze	
High jump	Ruth Beitia; Spain (ESP)	2.01 WL	Mariya Kuchina; Russia (RUS)	1.99	Ana Šimić; Croatia (CRO)	1.99 PB
Pole vault	Anzhelika Sidorova; Russia (RUS)	4.65	Katerina Stefanidi; Greece (GRE)	4.60	Angelina Zhuk-Krasnova; Russia (RUS)	4.60
Long jump	Éloyse Lesueur; France (FRA)	6.85	Ivana Španović; Serbia (SRB)	6.81	Darya Klishina; Russia (RUS)	6.65
Triple jump	Olha Saladuha; Ukraine (UKR)	14.73 SB	Ekaterina Koneva; Russia (RUS)	14.69	Irina Gumenyuk; Russia (RUS)	14.46 SB
Shot put	Christina Schwanitz; Germany (GER)	19.90	Anita Márton; Hungary (HUN)	19.04 NR	Yuliya Leantsiuk; Belarus (BLR)	18.68
Discus throw	Sandra Perković; Croatia (CRO)	71.08 WL, NR	Mélina Robert-Michon; France (FRA)	65.33	Shanice Craft; Germany (GER)	64.33
Javelin throw	Barbora Špotáková; Czech Republic (CZE)	64.41	Tatjana Jelača; Serbia (SRB)	64.21 NR	Linda Stahl; Germany (GER)	63.91
Hammer throw	Anita Włodarczyk; Poland (POL)	78.76 WL, CR, NR	Martina Hrašnová; Slovakia (SVK)	74.66	Joanna Fiodorow; Poland (POL)	73.67
Heptathlon	Antoinette Nana Djimou; France (FRA)	6551 SB	Nadine Broersen; Netherlands (NED)	6498	Nafissatou Thiam; Belgium (BEL)	6423
WR world record | ER European record | CR championship record | NR national record | WL world leading | EL European leading | PB personal best | SB seasonal best

== Medal table ==
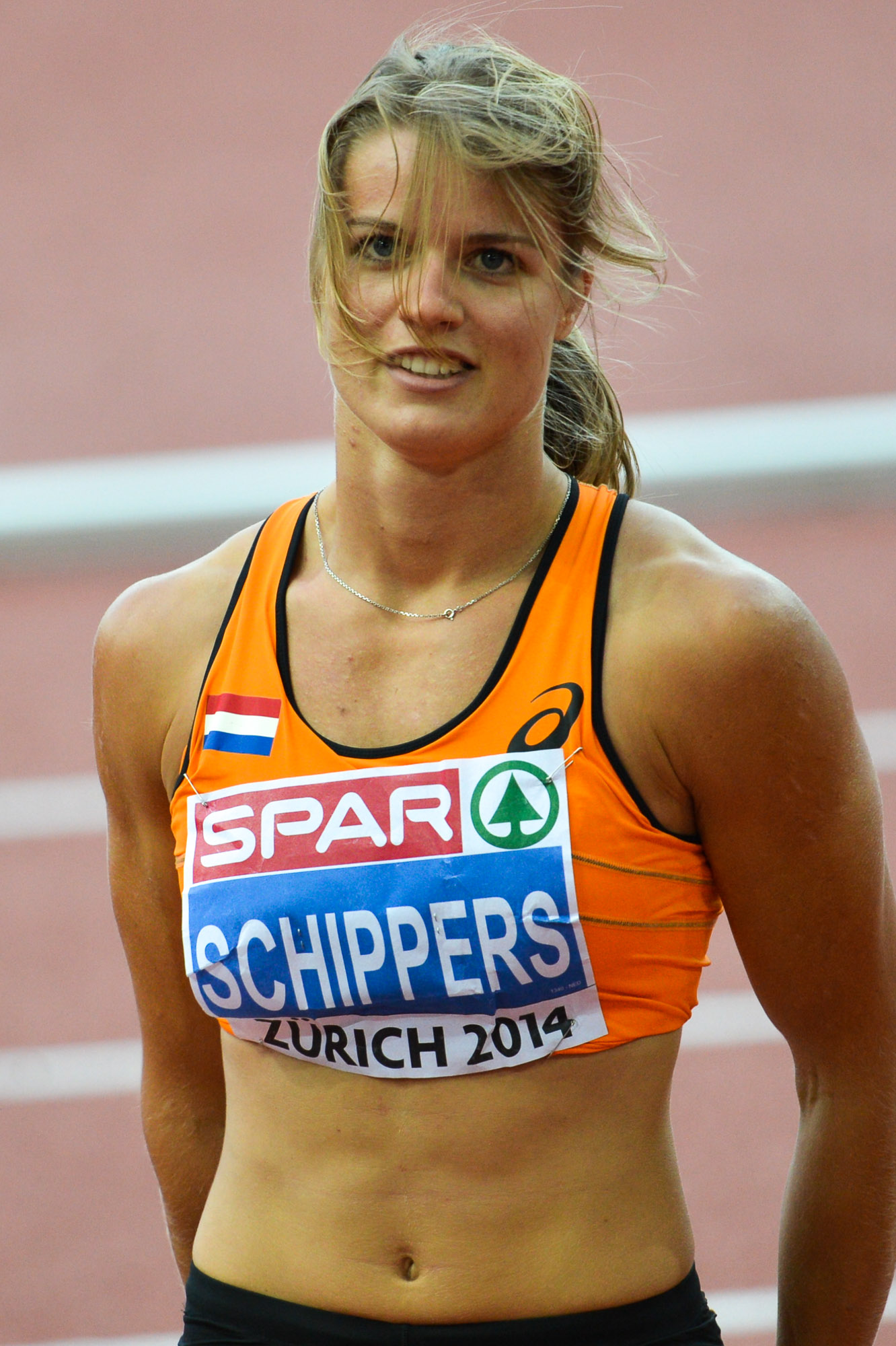
Dafne Schippers won the women's 100 and 200 metres

* Host nation (Switzerland)

Rank	Nation	Gold	Silver	Bronze	Total
1	Great Britain & N.I.	12	5	6	23
2	France	9	8	8	25
3	Germany	4	1	3	8
4	Russia	3	4	8	15
5	Netherlands	3	2	1	6
6	Poland	2	6	4	12
7	Ukraine	2	5	2	9
8	Spain	2	1	3	6
9	Italy	2	1	0	3
10	Belarus	2	0	2	4
11	Sweden	1	2	0	3
12	Czech Republic	1	1	4	6
13	Hungary	1	1	0	2
14	Croatia	1	0	1	2
14	Finland	1	0	1	2
16	Switzerland*	1	0	0	1
17	Estonia	0	2	0	2
17	Greece	0	2	0	2
17	Serbia	0	2	0	2
17	Slovakia	0	2	0	2
21	Azerbaijan	0	1	0	1
21	Norway	0	1	0	1
23	Belgium	0	0	1	1
23	Ireland	0	0	1	1
23	Israel	0	0	1	1
23	Portugal	0	0	1	1
23	Turkey	0	0	1	1
Totals (27 entries)		47	47	48	142

== Participating nations ==
Athletes from a total of 50 member federations of the European Athletics Association are competing at these Championships.

- Albania (2)
- Andorra (2)
- Armenia (3)
- Austria (13)
- Azerbaijan (2)
- Belarus (29)
- Belgium (35)
- Bosnia and Herzegovina (4)
- Bulgaria (22)
- Croatia (23)
- Cyprus (7)
- Czech Republic (42)
- Denmark (14)
- Estonia (26)
- Finland (36)
- France (57)
- Georgia (3)
- Germany (93)
- Gibraltar (3)
- Great Britain & N.I. (74)
- Greece (26)
- Hungary (27)
- Iceland (5)
- Ireland (25)
- Israel (10)
- Italy (78)
- Latvia (26)
- Liechtenstein (1)
- Lithuania (35)
- Luxembourg (4)
- Macedonia (2)
- Malta (2)
- Moldova (3)
- Monaco (1)
- Montenegro (1)
- Netherlands (43)
- Norway (40)
- Poland (62)
- Portugal (44)
- Romania (20)
- Russia (93)
- San Marino (2)
- Serbia (11)
- Slovakia (25)
- Slovenia (15)
- Spain (74)
- Sweden (60)
- Switzerland (53) (host)
- Turkey (29)
- Ukraine (70)

== See also ==
- List of stripped European Athletics Championships medals
- 2014 African Championships in Athletics
