= Nil de Oliveira =

Brazilian-Swedish athlete and short-distance runner

Nil de Oliveira (born 1986) is a Brazilian-Swedish athlete and short-distance runner. On 29 June, Oliveira qualified for the 200 metres final at the 2012 European Athletics Championships in Helsinki competing for Sweden.
