= Germany at the 2014 European Athletics Championships =

- WA code: GER
- National federation: Deutscher Leichtathletik-Verband
- Website: www.leichtathletik.de

in Zürich
- Competitors: 93 (as of 30 July 2014)
- Medals Ranked 3rd: Gold 4 Silver 1 Bronze 3 Total 8

European Athletics Championships appearances (overview)
- 1934; 1938; 1946–1950; 1954; 1958; 1962; 1966–1990; 1994; 1998; 2002; 2006; 2010; 2012; 2014; 2016; 2018; 2022; 2024

Germany are competing at the 2014 European Athletics Championships in Zürich, Switzerland, from 12–17 August 2014. A delegation of 93 athletes were sent to represent the country.

The following athletes has been selected to compete by the German Athletics Federation.

Men
Track and road

Athletes	Event	Heats		Semifinal		Final	
Athletes	Event	Result	Rank	Result	Rank	Result	Rank
Lucas Jakubczyk	100 metres	10.23	6 Q	10.23	4 Q	10.25	5
Sven Knipphals	100 metres	10.37	15 Q	10.37	12	did not advance	
Julian Reus	100 metres	10.32	10 Q	10.35	10	did not advance	
Robin Erewa	200 metres	20.72	14 q	20.82	14	did not advance	
Aleixo-Platini Menga	200 metres	20.71	13 q	20.89	16	did not advance	
Julian Reus	200 metres	did not start					
Kamghe Gaba	400 metres	45.80	10 Q	46.01	8 Q	45.83	6
Dennis Krüger	800 metres	1:48.06	11 q	1:48.33	12	did not advance	
Timo Benitz	1500 metres	3:39.83	10 Q	—		3:47.26	7
Florian Orth	1500 metres	3:39.99	12 q	—		3:54.35	10
Homiyu Tesfaye	1500 metres	3:39.64	7 Q	—		3:46.46	5
Arne Gabius	5000 metres	—				14:11.84	7
Richard Ringer	5000 metres	—				14:10.92	4
André Pollmächer	Marathon	—				2:14:51	8
Erik Balnuweit	110 metres hurdles	13.48	12 Q	13.49	10	did not advance	
Matthias Bühler	110 metres hurdles	13.40	6 Q	13.39	9	did not advance	
Gregor Traber	110 metres hurdles	13.43	7 Q	13.58	14	did not advance	
Felix Franz	400 metres hurdles	50.23	16 Q	48.96	3 q	49.83	5
Varg Königsmark	400 metres hurdles	49.46	2 Q	49.12	6 Q	49.91	7
Martin Grau	3000 metres steeplechase	8:32.35	2 Q	—		8:44.46	13
Steffen Uliczka	3000 metres steeplechase	8:36.59	14 Q	—		8:32.99	7
Julian Reus; Sven Knipphals; Alexander Kosenkow; Lucas Jakubczyk	4 × 100 metres relay	38.15	1 Q	—		38.09	2nd place, silver medalist(s)
Kamghe Gaba; Miguel Rigau; Jonas Plass; Thomas Schneider; David Gollnow (*)	4 × 400 metres relay	3:02.41	3 Q	—		3:01.70	6
Nils Gloger	20 km walk	—				1:29:44	27
Christopher Linke	20 km walk	—				1:21:00	5
Hagen Pohle	20 km walk	—				1:24:00	15
Carl Dohmann	50 km walk	—				3:51:27	15

Field events

Athletes	Event	Qualification		Final	
Athletes	Event	Distance	Position	Distance	Position
Karsten Dilla	Pole vault	5.50	7 q	5.40	9
Malte Mohr	Pole vault	did not start			
Tobias Scherbarth	Pole vault	No mark		did not advance	
Sebastian Bayer	Long jump	7.56	23	did not advance	
Julian Howard	Long jump	7.63	21	did not advance	
Christian Reif	Long jump	8.02	4 Q	7.95	8
David Storl	Shot put	20.76	1 Q	21.41	1st place, gold medalist(s)
Robert Harting	Discus throw	67.01	1 Q	66.07	1st place, gold medalist(s)
Daniel Jasinski	Discus throw	64.11	5 Q	62.04	7
Martin Wierig	Discus throw	63.96	6 q	60.82	11
Andreas Hofmann	Javelin throw	79.59	8 q	77.42	9
Thomas Röhler	Javelin throw	81.24	3 Q	70.31	12

Combined events – Decathlon

Athlete	Event	100 m	LJ	SP	HJ	400 m	110H	DT	PV	JT	1500 m	Final	Rank
Arthur Abele	Result	10.90	7.55	15.39	1.98	48.59	13.55	43.25	4.70	62.45	4:20.37	8477	5
Arthur Abele	Points	883	947	814	785	881	1033	731	819	775	809	8477	5
Rico Freimuth	Result	10.71	7.36	14.39	1.98	48.53	13.63	48.81	4.80	62.74	4:59.27	8308	7
Rico Freimuth	Points	926	900	752	785	884	1023	846	849	779	564	8308	7
Kai Kazmirek	Result	10.75	7.68	14.01	2.13	47.35	14.05	43.37	4.60	63.17	4:38.67	8458	6
Kai Kazmirek	Points	917	980	729	925	941	968	733	790	786	689	8458	6

Women
Track and road

Athletes	Event	Heats		Semifinal		Final	
Athletes	Event	Result	Rank	Result	Rank	Result	Rank
Rebekka Haase	100 metres	11.35	13 Q	11.52	18	did not advance	
Tatjana Pinto	100 metres	11.41	15 Q	11.48	16	did not advance	
Verena Sailer	100 metres	11.25	7 Q	11.24	9	did not advance	
Esther Cremer	400 metres	51.98	9 Q	52.83	12	did not advance	
Diana Sujew	1500 metres	4:11.27	6 q	—		4:08.63	8
Maren Kock	5000 metres	—				16:04.60	15
Sabrina Mockenhaupt	10,000 metres	—				32:30.49	6
Katharina Heinig	Marathon	—				2:40:11	28
Sabrina Mockenhaupt	Marathon	—				did not finish	
Mona Stockhecke	Marathon	—				2:35:44	22
Nadine Hildebrand	100 metres hurdles	12.79	3 Q	12.92	6 q	13.01	6
Franziska Hofmann	100 metres hurdles	13.21	17 Q	13.14	14	did not advance	
Cindy Roleder	100 metres hurdles	12.91	6 Q	12.84	3 Q	12.82	3rd place, bronze medalist(s)
Christiane Klopsch	400 metres hurdles	56.23	6 Q	56.28	9	did not advance	
Gesa Felicitas Krause	3000 metres steeplechase	9:47.36	3 Q	—		9:35.46	5
Antje Möldner-Schmidt	3000 metres steeplechase	9:52.02	8 Q	—		9:29.45	1st place, gold medalist(s)
Jana Sussmann	3000 metres steeplechase	10:07.99	18	—		did not advance	
Josefina Elsler; Rebekka Haase; Tatjana Pinto; Verena Sailer	4 × 100 metres relay	did not finish		—		did not advance	
Esther Cremer; Christiane Klopsch; Lena Schmidt; Ruth Sophia Spelmeyer; Janin Lindenberg (*); Lara Hoffmann (*)	4 × 400 metres relay	3:30.39	6 q	—		3:27.69	6

Field events

Athletes	Event	Qualification		Final	
Athletes	Event	Distance	Position	Distance	Position
Marie-Laurence Jungfleisch	High jump	1.89	1 q	1.97	5
Katharina Bauer	Pole vault	4.25	17	did not advance	
Carolin Hingst	Pole vault	4.45	1 q	4.35	10
Lisa Ryzih	Pole vault	4.45	6 q	4.60	4
Melanie Bauschke	Long jump	6.56	7 q	6.55	6
Malaika Mihambo	Long jump	6.70	2 Q	6.65	4
Sosthene Moguenara	Long jump	6.50	11 q	6.38	9
Katja Demut	Triple jump	13.37	18	did not advance	
Jenny Elbe	Triple jump	13.83	7 q	13.68	11
Kristin Gierisch	Triple jump	13.91	5 q	13.76	9
Christina Schwanitz	Shot put	19.35	1 Q	19.90	1st place, gold medalist(s)
Lena Urbaniak	Shot put	17.17	10 q	17.77	8
Shanice Craft	Discus throw	61.88	3 Q	64.33	3rd place, bronze medalist(s)
Julia Fischer	Discus throw	57.78	7 q	61.20	5
Anna Rüh	Discus throw	59.84	4 Q	62.46	4
Christin Hussong	Javelin throw	61.13	2 Q	59.29	7
Katharina Molitor	Javelin throw	58.24	8 Q	58.00	9
Linda Stahl	Javelin throw	59.24	7 Q	63.91	3rd place, bronze medalist(s)
Betty Heidler	Hammer throw	70.49	5 Q	72.39	5
Kathrin Klaas	Hammer throw	69.78	8 Q	72.89	4
Carolin Paesler	Hammer throw	68.47	9 q	61.89	10

Combined events – Heptathlon

Athlete	Event	100H	HJ	SP	200 m	LJ	JT	800 m	Final	Rank
Claudia Rath	Result	13.54	1.79	12.88	24.43	6.32	43.45	2:16.43	6225	8
Claudia Rath	Points	1044	966	719	940	949	734	873	6225	8
Carolin Schäfer	Result	13.20	1.82	13.37	23.84	6.30	44.19	2:17.39	6395	4
Carolin Schäfer	Points	1094	1003	752	996	943	748	859	6395	4
Lilli Schwarzkopf	Result	13.87	1.85	14.44	25.86	6.18	52.17	2:17.67	6332	5
Lilli Schwarzkopf	Points	997	1041	823	809	905	902	855	6332	5
