= Lynsey Sharp =

British track and field athlete

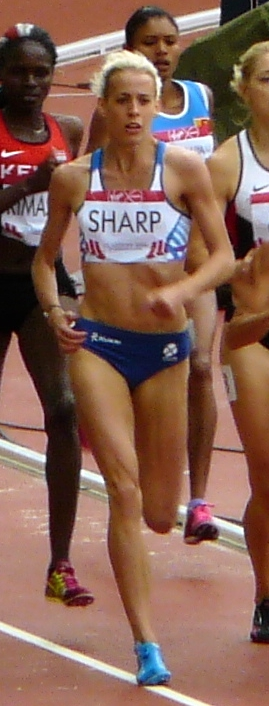
- Sharp competing at the 2014 Commonwealth Games

Personal information
- Born: 11 July 1990 (age 35) Dumfries, Scotland, United Kingdom
- Education: Edinburgh Napier University
- Height: 1.74 m (5 ft 8 1/2 in)
- Weight: 59 kg (130 lb) (2014)

Sport
- Country: Great Britain; Scotland
- Sport: Athletics
- Event: 800 metres
- Coached by: David Harmer
Medal record
Women's athletics
Representing Great Britain
Diamond League
Second place	2015	800 m
Third place	2014	800 m
European Championships
Gold medal – first place	2012 Helsinki	800 m
Silver medal – second place	2014 Zürich	800 m
European U23 Championships
Silver medal – second place	2011 Ostrava	800 m
Representing Scotland
Commonwealth Games
Silver medal – second place	2014 Glasgow	800 m
Commonwealth Youth Games
Bronze medal – third place	2008 Pune	800 m

Lynsey Sharp (born 11 July 1990) is a former Scottish track and field athlete who competed in the 800 metres. She is the 2012 European champion and represented Great Britain at the 2012 Olympic Games in London. She won a silver medal at the 2014 Commonwealth Games. Her personal best is 1:57.69, the seventh fastest time over 800m by a British woman, set in the final of the 2016 Olympic Games in Rio de Janeiro.

== Personal life ==
Lynsey Sharp was born in Dumfries, Scotland and lived her early life in nearby Lochmaben. She is the daughter of former Scottish athletes Cameron Sharp and Carol Sharp (née Lightfoot). Her father won a 1982 European silver medal in the 200 m and competed at the 1980 Olympic Games, while her mother has an 800 m personal best of 2:02.91 and competed at the 1982 Commonwealth Games.

Sharp went to The Mary Erskine School in Edinburgh. She graduated with a 2:1 in Law (LLB) from Edinburgh Napier University in 2012 a few weeks before competing in the London Olympics. She has said she was inspired to study law after her father fought a medical negligence case following permanent injuries he sustained in a road crash. She is also a fan of Scottish Premiership side Rangers.

Sharp is married to fellow Scottish athlete Andrew Butchart. The couple have a son, Max, born in October 2021.

== Career ==
As a teenager, Sharp competed at the IAAF World Youth Championships and IAAF World Junior Championships. In 2011, she improved her 800 m personal best by almost four seconds. In June, she took her best down from 2:04.44, to 2:02.48 in Watford then 2:01:98 in Prague. Then in July, at the European U23 Championships in Ostrava, she further improved to 2:00.65, to win a bronze medal. This would be upgraded to silver due to the 2013 disqualification of Elena Arzhakova.

In June 2012, at the UK Championships & Olympic trials, Sharp was a surprise winner of the 800 metres. Olympic qualifying rules stated that a country could send three athletes in an event provided they had achieved the A standard, or one athlete who had the B standard. Sharp only had the B standard, while four other British women had the A standard: an injured Jenny Meadows and three athletes who Sharp had defeated at the Olympic trials. A week after the trials, Sharp won a silver medal at the European Championships in Helsinki with a personal best of 2:00.52, a time that was still outside the A standard. (This would be upgraded to gold the following year, after abnormalities were found in Elena Arzhakova's biological passport. Arzhakova was stripped of both her 2012 European title and 2011 European U23 title.) The selectors decided to select Sharp and leave behind athletes including Meadows and Marilyn Okoro. At the Olympics, she ran 2:01.41 in her heat to qualify for the semi-finals, where she finished seventh in 2:01.78, failing to reach the final.

At the end of the 2013 season, Sharp had surgery on her ankle as it had become infected. This resulted in her competing throughout the 2014 season against medical advice with an open wound in her foot. In July 2014, Sharp ran under two minutes in the 800 m for the first time, running 1:59.67 at the Diamond League meeting in Lausanne. In August, at the 2014 Commonwealth Games in Glasgow, she ran 2:01.34 to win a silver medal in the 800 m. The race was won by 2013 World champion Eunice Sum. The night before the Commonwealth 800 m final, Sharp suffered stomach cramps and sickness and had to be placed on a drip at the Poly-clinic at the Athletes' Village until 5:30 am on the morning of the race. Sharp's performance was hailed as "a miracle run". Two weeks after the Commonwealth Games, she won a silver medal at the European Championships in Zürich in a time of 1:58.80, breaking Susan Scott's Scottish record of 1:59.02 and moving to eighth on the UK all-time list. The race was won by Maryna Arzamasava of Belarus in 1:58.15.

=== 2016 Olympics ===
Sharp finished sixth in the 800 metres final at the 2016 Rio Olympics, improving her own Scottish record to 1:57.69. Following the race, Sharp broke into tears and said that "it was difficult to compete against Caster Semenya and other hyperandrogenic athletes after the rule to suppress testosterone levels was overturned." Sharp was criticised in the media when she appeared to ignore Semenya post-race while embracing fellow runners Joanna Jóźwik and Melissa Bishop. Sharp has since clarified her comments, in a now-deleted Twitter post:

I have a tremendous amount of respect for Caster. She is someone who I talk to regularly on the circuit... When asked on live TV, I felt I gave an honest and diplomatic response.

Sharp had previously claimed that "there were obvious athletes with heightened testosterone" and that there were "two separate races being run."

=== 2017–present ===
Sharp ran 1:58.80 in the 800 metres at the Athletissima Lausanne Diamond League race in July 2017, then later in the month ran a season's best of 1:58.01 at the Herculis Monaco Diamond League. Three weeks later at the 2017 World Championships in London, she reached the 800 m final, finishing eighth in 1:58.98.

At the 2018 Commonwealth Games, Sharp was eliminated in the heats of the 800 m, running 2:01.63.

After competing throughout 2019, Sharp went on hiatus due to surgery to remove pre-cancerous cells followed by pregnancy, but stated that she intends to return to competition.

Despite making a comeback in January 2023, in December 2023, Sharp announced her retirement from international athletics.

== Achievements ==
- Scottish Athletics Athlete of the Year: 2011 and 2012.
- CG Scottish Athlete of the Year: 2014
- Sunday Mail Young Scot Award: 2015
- British Champion (800 m): 2012, 2014, and 2015

Year	Competition	Venue	Position	Event	Notes
Representing Great Britain
2007	World Youth Championships	Ostrava, Czech Republic	15th (sf)	800 m	2:11.36
2008	World Junior Championships	Bydgoszcz, Poland	18th (sf)	800m	2:09.00
2011	European U23 Championships	Ostrava, Czech Republic	2nd	800 m	2:00.65
2012	European Championships	Helsinki, Finland	1st	800 m	2:00.52
2012	Olympic Games	London, United Kingdom	20th (sf)	800 m	2:01.78
2014	European Championships	Zurich, Switzerland	2nd	800 m	1:58.80
2015	World Championships	Beijing, China	14th (sf)	800 m	1:59.33
2016	Olympic Games	Rio de Janeiro, Brazil	6th	800 m	1:57.69
2017	World Championships	London, United Kingdom	8th	800 m	1:58.98
2019	World Championships	Doha, Qatar	31st (h)	800 m	2:03.57
Representing Scotland
2008	Commonwealth Youth Games	Pune, India	3rd	800 m	2:06.77
2014	Commonwealth Games	Glasgow, United Kingdom	2nd	800 m	2:01.34
2018	Commonwealth Games	Gold Coast, Australia	14th (h)	800 m	2:01.33
2018	Commonwealth Games	Gold Coast, Australia	6th	4 × 400 m	3:29.18
Representing Europe
2014	Continental Cup	Marrakesh, Morocco	5th	800 m	2:00.80
2014	Continental Cup	Marrakesh, Morocco	1st	Women's team	440.5 pts
(#) Indicates overall position in qualifying heats (h) or semifinals (sf)

- All information taken from IAAF profile and power of 10 profile.

=== Circuit wins and titles ===
- Diamond League
  - 2014: British Grand Prix
  - 2018: Memorial Van Damme
  - 2019: Anniversary Games
