= Justine Fedronic =

French middle-distance runner

Personal information
- Nationality: French
- Born: 11 May 1991 (age 35) Heidelberg, Germany
- Height: 169 cm (5 ft 7 in)
- Weight: 54 kg (119 lb)

Sport
- Country: France
- Sport: Track and field
- Event: 800 metres
- College team: Stanford University
- Club: Nike Running
- Turned pro: 2014
- Coached by: Danny Mackey from Brooks Beast
Medal record
Summer Olympics
2016 Rio de Janeiro	800 meters

Justine Fedronic (/fəˈdrɒnɪk/ fə-DRON-ik; born 11 May 1991) is a French middle-distance runner. She competed in the 800 metres at the 2014 and 2016 European Athletics Championships.

== Professional ==
Fedronic represented France at Athletics at the 2016 Summer Olympics – Women's 800 metres and placed 46th in 2:02.73.

== NCAA ==
Fedronic held a Stanford University school record for the outdoor 800 meters at 2 minutes, 00.97 seconds and is a two-time NCAA Division I All-American are secondary to the experience of being a part of a team. At the 2014 NCAA Division I Indoor Track and Field Championships, she placed 2nd with Amy Weissenbach, Kristyn Williams, Claudia Saunders, Justine Fedronic in Distance medley relay. At the 2013 NCAA Division I Outdoor Track and Field Championships, she placed 3rd in 800 m. At the 2012 NCAA Women's Division I Indoor Track and Field Championships and NCAA Women's Division I Outdoor Track and Field Championships, she earned honorable All-American by her 9th-place finishes.

== Prep ==
Fedronic graduated from Carlmont High School. Fedronic qualified for California Interscholastic Federation state track and field championship in 2006, 2008 and 2009. She won the 800 m in 2:12.81 at the 2009 CIF Central Coast Section Track Championships and won the 3 miles in 18:15.0 at the 2008 CIF-Central Coast Section Cross Country Championships. Fedronic won both 2006 and 2007 CIF-Central Coast Section Cross Country Championships. Fedronic won 800 meters at 2007 Arcadia Invitational in 2:08.08 and returned as a senior to the high school invitational to win the 800 m in 2:09.27.
