= Ben Bassaw =

French sprinter

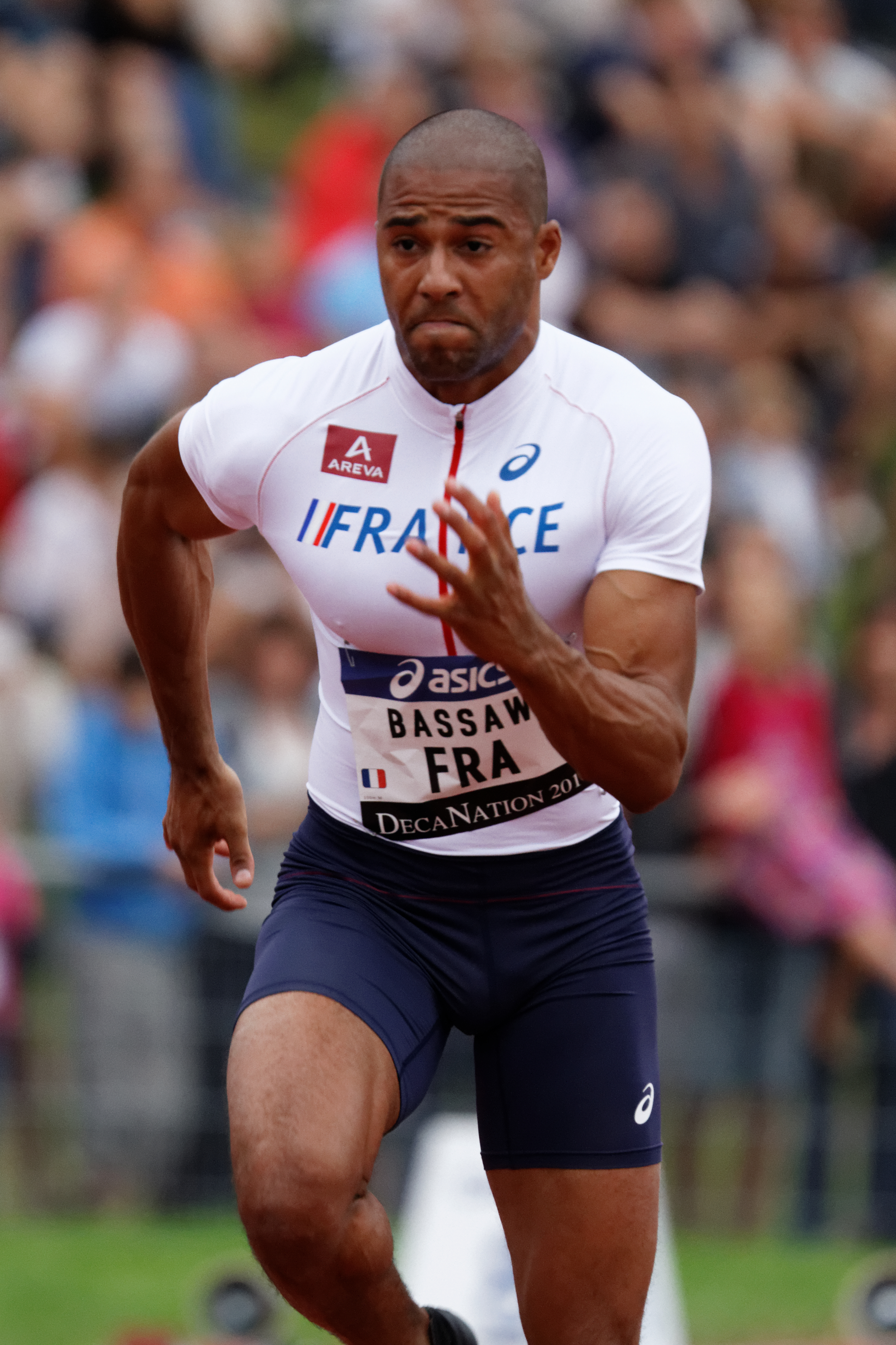
- Bassaw at the 2014 DécaNation

Personal information
- Full name: Benjamin Bassaw
- Born: 9 July 1989 (age 36) Angoulême, France
- Height: 1.84 m (6 ft 0 in)
- Weight: 90 kg (198 lb)

Sport
- Country: France
- Sport: Track and field
- Event(s): 100 metres, 200 metres

Achievements and titles
- Personal best(s): 100m: 10.31 (Poitiers 2012); 200m: 20.40 (La Roche-sur-Yon 2017)
Medal record
Men's athletics
Representing France
IAAF World Relays
| Silver medal – second place | 2015 Nassau | 4 × 200 m relay |
| Bronze medal – third place | 2014 Nassau | 4 × 200 m relay |
European Championships
| Bronze medal – third place | 2014 Zürich | 4 x 100 m relay |
European Team Championships
| Bronze medal – third place | 2017 Lille | 4 x 100 m relay |

Benjamin Bassaw (born 9 July 1989) is a French sprinter, who specialises in the 100 and 200 metres. He was part of the team that set the European record in the 4 × 200 metres relay, running 1:20.66 at the 2014 IAAF World Relays.
