= Teddy Tinmar =

French sprinter

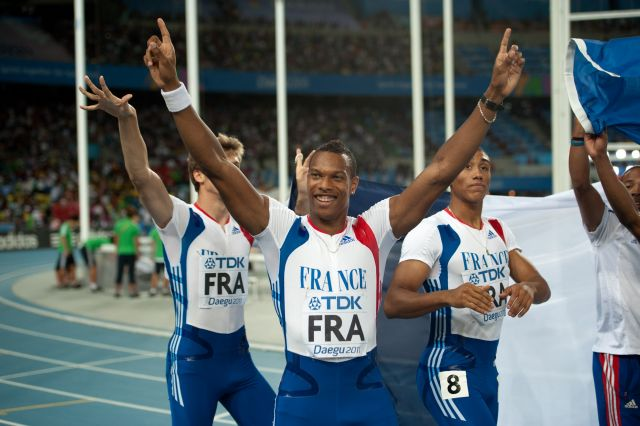

Personal information
- Nationality: France
- Born: 30 May 1987 (age 39) Bondy, Seine-Saint-Denis, France
- Height: 1.88 m (6 ft 2 in)
- Weight: 83 kg (183 lb)

Sport
- Sport: Running
- Events: 100 metres, 200 metres

Achievements and titles
- Personal bests: 100m: 10.30 s (Albi 2011); 200m: 21.15 s (Paris 2011)
Medal record
Men's athletics
Representing France
World Championships
Silver medal – second place	2011 Daegu	4×100 m relay
European Championships
Bronze medal – third place	2014 Zürich	4 x 100 m relay

Teddy Tinmar (born 30 May 1987) is a French sprinter, who specialises in the 100 and 200 metres. He helped the French men's 4×100 metres relay team to win a silver medal at the 2011 World Championships.

== Personal best ==
Distance	Time	venue
100m	10.30 s	Albi (29 July 2011)
200m	20.62 s	Herouville (8 July 2011)
