= 2014 European Athletics Championships – Women's 200 metres =

Women's 200 metres at the European Athletics Championships

The women's 200 metres at the 2014 European Athletics Championships took place at the Letzigrund on 14 and 15 August.

== Medalists ==
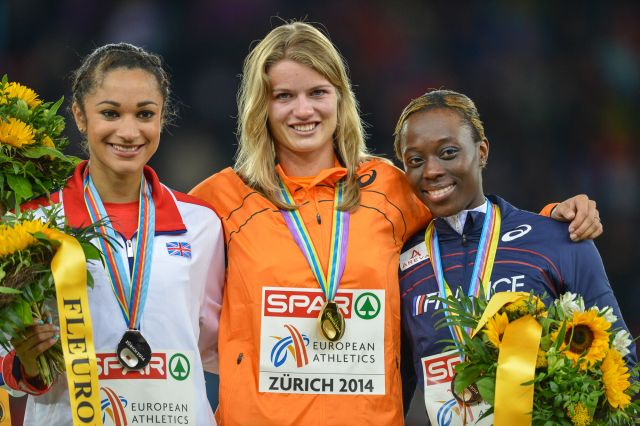
The podium

Gold	Dafne Schippers; Netherlands
Silver	Jodie Williams; Great Britain
Bronze	Myriam Soumaré; France

== Records ==
Standing records prior to the 2014 European Athletics Championships
World record	Florence Griffith-Joyner (USA)	21.34	Seoul, South Korea	29 September 1988
European record	Marita Koch (GDR)	21.71	Karl-Marx-Stadt, East Germany	10 June 1979
European record	Marita Koch (GDR)	21.71	Potsdam, East Germany	21 July 1984
European record	Heike Drechsler (GDR)	21.71	Jena, East Germany	29 June 1986
European record	Heike Drechsler (GDR)	21.71	Stuttgart, West Germany	29 August 1986
Championship record	Heike Drechsler (GDR)	21.71	Stuttgart, West Germany	29 August 1986
World Leading	Tori Bowie (USA)	22.18	Eugene, United States	31 May 2014
European Leading	Dafne Schippers (NED)	22.34	Glasgow, Great Britain	12 July 2014

== Schedule ==
Date	Time	Round
14 August 2014	10:50	Round 1
14 August 2014	19:42	Semifinal
15 August 2014	20:25	Final

All times are local times (UTC+2)

== Results ==
=== Round 1 ===
First 4 in each heat (Q) and 4 best performers (q) advance to the Semifinals.

Wind:
Heat 1: +0.1 m/s, Heat 2: +0.1 m/s, Heat 3: +0.1 m/s, Heat 4: −0.4 m/s, Heat 5: +0.1 m/s

Rank	Heat	Lane	Name	Nationality	Time	Note
1	3	6	Dafne Schippers	Netherlands	22.63	Q
2	5	3	Dina Asher-Smith	Great Britain	22.65	Q, PB
3	2	7	Jodie Williams	Great Britain	22.78	Q
4	5	6	Myriam Soumaré	France	22.87	Q
5	2	6	Mujinga Kambundji	Switzerland	22.95	Q, NUR
6	4	4	Jamile Samuel	Netherlands	23.00	Q
7	5	7	Hanna-Maari Latvala	Finland	23.13	Q, SB
8	4	7	Léa Sprunger	Switzerland	23.15	Q, SB
9	4	2	Ivet Lalova	Bulgaria	23.17	Q, SB
10	4	3	Marzia Caravelli	Italy	23.27	Q, SB
11	2	5	Nataliya Pohrebnyak	Ukraine	23.31	Q
12	4	5	Yekaterina Renzhina	Russia	23.33	q
13	3	2	Maria Belibasáki	Greece	23.34	Q
14	5	4	Kelly Proper	Ireland	23.37	Q
15	2	3	Irene Ekelund	Sweden	23.38	Q, =SB
15	1	2	Bianca Williams	Great Britain	23.38	Q
17	3	5	Inna Eftimova	Bulgaria	23.42	Q
18	1	5	Nataliya Strohova	Ukraine	23.47	Q
19	1	7	Irene Siragusa	Italy	23.61	Q
=20	5	5	Martina Amidei	Italy	23.64	q
=20	3	8	Andreea Ograzeanu	Romania	23.64	Q
22	1	8	Yekaterina Vukolova	Russia	23.69	Q
23	5	8	Ramona Papaioannou	Cyprus	23.70	q
24	3	4	Sabina Veit	Slovenia	23.72	q
25	1	3	Joëlle Golay	Switzerland	23.82	
26	2	8	Andriána Férra	Greece	23.88	
27	4	6	Carla Tavares	Portugal	23.90	
28	2	4	Hafdís Sigurðardóttir	Iceland	23.93	=PB
29	1	6	Éva Kaptur	Hungary	24.07	=PB
30	3	7	Elisabeth Slettum	Norway	24.09	
31	2	2	Kristina Žumer	Slovenia	24.24	
32	1	4	Lenka Kršáková	Slovakia	24.69	
33	5	2	Nimet Karakuş	Turkey	25.31	
34	4	8	Diana Khubeseryan	Armenia	25.74	
	3	3	Jennifer Galais	France	DQ	R162.7

=== Semifinals ===
First 2 in each heat (Q) and 2 best performers (q) advance to the Final.

Wind:
Heat 1: +0.3 m/s, Heat 2: −0.6 m/s, Heat 3: +0.3 m/s

Rank	Heat	Lane	Name	Nationality	Time	Note
1	2	5	Dafne Schippers	Netherlands	22.38	Q
2	1	5	Myriam Soumaré	France	22.46	Q, SB
3	1	3	Dina Asher-Smith	Great Britain	22.61	Q, PB
4	3	5	Jodie Williams	Great Britain	22.80	Q
5	2	4	Bianca Williams	Great Britain	22.81	Q
6	2	6	Mujinga Kambundji	Switzerland	22.84	q, NUR
7	1	4	Hanna-Maari Latvala	Finland	22.98	q, =PB
8	2	7	Nataliya Pohrebnyak	Ukraine	23.10	
9	1	6	Léa Sprunger	Switzerland	23.12	SB
10	1	8	Kelly Proper	Ireland	23.15	PB
11	3	6	Jamile Samuel	Netherlands	23.18	Q
12	2	8	Marzia Caravelli	Italy	23.23	SB
13	3	7	Irene Ekelund	Sweden	23.26	SB
13	3	2	Yekaterina Renzhina	Russia	23.26	
15	1	7	Inna Eftimova	Bulgaria	23.27	SB
16	2	3	Ivet Lalova	Bulgaria	23.30	
17	3	4	Nataliya Strohova	Ukraine	23.36	
18	3	3	Maria Belibasáki	Greece	23.37	
18	1	2	Yekaterina Vukolova	Russia	23.37	
20	3	8	Irene Siragusa	Italy	23.50	
21	1	1	Martina Amidei	Italy	23.51	
22	2	2	Sabina Veit	Slovenia	23.99	
	3	1	Ramona Papaioannou	Cyprus	DNF	
	2	1	Andreea Ograzeanu	Romania	DNS	

=== Final ===
Wind: −0.5 m/s

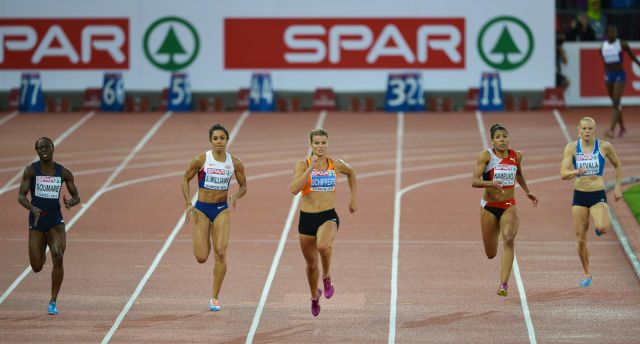
The final

Rank	Lane	Name	Nationality	Time	Note
1st place, gold medalist(s)	3	Dafne Schippers	Netherlands	22.03	WL, NR
2nd place, silver medalist(s)	4	Jodie Williams	Great Britain	22.46	PB
3rd place, bronze medalist(s)	5	Myriam Soumaré	France	22.58	
4	8	Bianca Williams	Great Britain	22.68	
5	2	Mujinga Kambundji	Switzerland	22.83	NR
6	7	Jamile Samuel	Netherlands	23.31	
7	1	Hanna-Maari Latvala	Finland	23.48	
	6	Dina Asher-Smith	Great Britain	DNF	
