= List of Azerbaijani records in athletics =

The following are the national records in athletics in Azerbaijan maintained by the Azerbaijan Athletics Federation (AAF).

== Outdoor ==
Key to tables: Awaiting ratification Record not kept by AAF Not ratified or later rescinded by AAF

=== Men ===
Event	Record	Athlete	Date	Meet	Place	Ref.
100 m	10.08 (+1.3 m/s)	Ramil Quliyev	13 June 2009		Istanbul, Turkey	
200 m	20.04 (+0.1 m/s)	Ramil Quliyev	10 July 2009	Universiade	Belgrade, Serbia	
400 m	45.83	Yuriy Dudkin	18 September 1986		Tashkent, Soviet Union	
800 m	1:46.7 h	Alibey Sükürov	3 June 2004		Baku, Azerbaijan	
800 m	1:46.64 (Note: unconfirmed)	Alibey Sükürov	3 July 2004		Baku, Azerbaijan	
1500 m	3:43.7 h	Boris Kutukov	22 April 1979		Baku, Soviet Union	
3000 m	7:34.57	Hayle Ibrahimov	10 May 2013	Qatar Athletic Super Grand Prix	Doha, Qatar	
5000 m	13:09.17	Hayle Ibrahimov	28 August 2014	Weltklasse Zürich	Zürich, Switzerland	
5 km (road)	14:22+	Evans Kiplagat	30 April 2017	Istanbul Half Marathon	Istanbul, Turkey	
10,000 m	28:55.82	Evans Kiplagat	20 May 2017	Islamic Solidarity Games	Baku, Azerbaijan	
10 km (road)	28:41+	Evans Kiplagat	30 April 2017	Istanbul Half Marathon	Istanbul, Turkey	
15 km (road)	43:10+	Evans Kiplagat	30 April 2017	Istanbul Half Marathon	Istanbul, Turkey	
20 km (road)	58:29+	Evans Kiplagat	30 April 2017	Istanbul Half Marathon	Istanbul, Turkey	
Half marathon	1:01:47	Evans Kiplagat	30 April 2017	Istanbul Half Marathon	Istanbul, Turkey	
Marathon	2:11:22	Tilahun Aliyev	25 January 2013	Dubai Marathon	Dubai, United Arab Emirates	
110 m hurdles	13.63 (−0.6 m/s)	Gennadiy Chugunov	8 June 1986		Leningrad, Soviet Union	
400 m hurdles	50.00	Aleksandr Karasyov	30 May 1976		Munich, West Germany	
3000 m steeplechase	8:52.0	Nikolay Kotov	19 May 1974		Baku, Soviet Union	
High jump	2.37 m	Valeriy Sereda	2 September 1984	Rieti Meeting	Rieti, Italy	
Pole vault	5.00 m	Aleksandr Zyatin	5 May 1973		Kharkiv, Soviet Union	
Long jump	8.03 m	Vladimir Tsepelyov	17 September 1978		Tbilisi, Soviet Union	
Triple jump	17.33 m (+1.1 m/s)	Vasif Asadov	18 June 1990		Bryansk, Soviet Union	
Shot put	17.50 m	Ismail Aliyev	13 June 2025	28th Afgan Safarov's International Memorial	Baku, Azerbaijan	
Discus throw	56.86 m	Rauf Tarzumanov	19 June 1982		Baku, Soviet Union	
Discus throw	57.02 m	Rauf Tarzumanov	1985			
Hammer throw	79.56 m	Dzmitry Marshyn	12 June 2012	Olympic Champions Prizes	Minsk, Belarus	
Javelin throw	60.49 m	Orxan Qasimov	19 May 2017	Islamic Solidarity Games	Baku, Azerbaijan	
Decathlon	7359 pts h	Valeriy Deryabin	21–22 May 1977		Baku, Soviet Union	
Decathlon	100m (wind) / Long jump (wind) / Shot put / High jump / 400m / 110m H (wind) / Discus / Pole vault / Javelin / 1500m; 11.0 / 6.95 m / 14.06 m / 1.89 m / 50.7 / 15.6 / 44.10 m / 4.20 m / 56.10 m / 4:39.2					
20 km walk (road)	1:24:57	Sergey Shildkret	25 April 1987		Navapolatsk, Soviet Union	
50 km walk (road)	3:54:47	Sergey Shildkret	17 July 1985		Leningrad, Soviet Union	
4 × 100 m relay	39.78	Azerbaijan; Valentin Bulichev; Ramil Guliyev; Ruslan Abbasov; Pavel Setin	20 June 2009	European Team Championships 3rd League	Sarajevo, Bosnia and Herzegovina	
4 × 400 m relay	3:09.15	Azerbaijan SSR; Igor Sinepupov; Felix Tatoyev; Andrey Vamishin; Yuriy Dudkin	20 September 1986		Tashkent, Soviet Union	

=== Women ===
Event	Record	Athlete	Date	Meet	Place	Ref.
100 m	11.61 (+0.0 m/s)	Zakiyya Hasanova	9 June 2018		Schaan, Liechtenstein	
200 m	23.58 (+1.1 m/s)	Lamiya Valiyeva	25 June 2025	European Team Championships	Maribor, Slovenia	
400 m	54.83	Lamiya Valiyeva	2 August 2023	World University Games	Chengdu, China	
800 m	2:02.50	Anastyasia Komarova	21 June 2015	European Games	Baku, Azerbaijan	
1500 m	4:15.72	Gezashign Safarova	24 July 2009		Novi Sad, Serbia	
3000 m	8:55.33	Layes Abdullayeva	19 July 2010	World Junior Championships	Moncton, Canada	
5000 m	15:29.47	Layes Abdullayeva	17 July 2011	European U23 Championships	Ostrava, Czech Republic	
5 km (road)	18:59+	Anna Yusupova	7 January 2024	Dubai Marathon	Dubai, United Arab Emirates	
10,000 m	32:18.05	Layes Abdullayeva	15 July 2011	European U23 Championships	Ostrava, Czech Republic	
10 km (road)	37:56+	Anna Yusupova	7 January 2024	Dubai Marathon	Dubai, United Arab Emirates	
15 km (road)	50:56	Mare Ibrahimova	18 October 2009		Istanbul, Turkey	
20 km (road)	1:16:02+	Anna Yusupova	7 January 2024	Dubai Marathon	Dubai, United Arab Emirates	
Half marathon	1:08:45	Mare Ibrahimova	1 November 2009		New Delhi, India	
25 km (road)	1:35:25+	Anna Yusupova	7 January 2024	Dubai Marathon	Dubai, United Arab Emirates	
30 km (road)	1:55:00+	Anna Yusupova	7 January 2024	Dubai Marathon	Dubai, United Arab Emirates	
Marathon	2:42:32 (Note: by World Athletics source; 2:42:25 by other sources)	Anna Yusupova	7 January 2024	Dubai Marathon	Dubai, United Arab Emirates	
Marathon	2:31:26	Marege Hayelom	19 January 2020	Mumbai Marathon	Mumbai, India	
100 m hurdles	13.85	Ella Kolesnikova	6 July 1990		Sverdlovsk, Soviet Union	
400 m hurdles	1:00.66	Tatyana Averiyanova	18 September 1986		Tashkent, Soviet Union	
3000 m steeplechase	9:34.75	Layes Abdullayeva	30 July 2010	European Championships	Barcelona, Spain	
High jump	1.80 m	Nina Brintseva	15 May 1969		Baku, Soviet Union	
Pole vault	3.80 m	Yelena Gladkova	1 June 2014		Baku, Azerbaijan	
Pole vault	3.80 m	Yelena Gladkova	6 August 2015		Saransk, Russia	
Pole vault	3.80 m	Yelena Gladkova	26 June 2016		Kazan, Russia	
Long jump	6.41 m	Galina Tumasova	22 September 1985		Baku, Soviet Union	
Long jump	6.42 m	Grete Adiants	21 June 1980		Sumqayit, Soviet Union	
Triple jump	13.89 m (+1.0 m/s)	Yekaterina Sariyeva	2 July 2023	Qosanov Memorial	Almaty, Kazakhstan	
Triple jump	13.91 m (±0.0 m/s)	Yekaterina Sariyeva	10 August 2026	European Championships	Birmingham, United Kingdom	
Shot put	16.31 m	Valentina Podgornova	16 July 1978		Donetsk, Soviet Union	
Discus throw	64.06 m	Galina Koshkareva	31 May 1983		Tbilisi, Soviet Union	
Hammer throw	77.10 m	Hanna Skydan	23 August 2023	World Championships	Budapest, Hungary	
Javelin throw	46.20 m	Ragneta Zulfugarova	4 May 2017		Baku, Azerbaijan	
Heptathlon	4615 pts	Sinaida Levshanova	18–19 June 1983		Moscow, Soviet Union	
Heptathlon	100m H (wind) / High jump / Shot put / 200m (wind) / Long jump (wind) / Javelin / 800m; 15.14 / 1.60 m / 11.72 m / 27.83 / 5.49 m / 27.84 m / 2:34.60					
5000 m walk (track)	22:55.0 h	Albina Lesnikova	1988		Baku, Soviet Union	
10 km walk (road)	46:01	Albina Lesnikova	1988		Alytus, Soviet Union	
20 km walk (road)	1:39:58	Aida Isayeva	19 May 2000		Moscow, Russia	
4 × 100 m relay	46.10	Azerbaijan; Yekaterina Sokolova; Ylena Chebanu; Valeriya Balyanina; Alyona Setina	21 June 2015	European Games	Baku, Azerbaijan	
4 × 400 m relay	3:44.40	Azerbaijan; Shafa Mammadova; Adila Mammadli; Zakiyya Hasanova; Anastasiya Komarova	22 June 2015	European Games	Baku, Azerbaijan	

=== Mixed ===
Event	Record	Athlete	Date	Meet	Place	Ref.
4 × 400 m relay	3:29.57	Azerbaijan; Javid Mammadov; Ilaha Guliyeva; Novruz Asadli; Lamiya Valiyeva	25 June 2025	European Team Championships	Maribor, Slovenia	

== Indoor ==
=== Men ===
Event	Record	Athlete	Date	Meet	Place	Ref.
60 m	6.61	Aleksandr Kornelyuk	9 March 1974		Gothenburg, Sweden	
200 m	21.51	Ramil Guliyev	4 February 2009		Tallinn, Estonia	
300 m	33.62	Ramil Guliyev	1 February 2009		Moscow, Russia	
400 m	47.15	Dmitriy Chumichkin	1 March 2002	European Championships	Vienna, Austria	
800 m	1:48.17	Andrey Vamishin	20 January 1989		Moscow, Soviet Union	
1500 m						
3000 m	7:39.59	Hayle Ibrahimov	21 February 2013	XL Galan	Stockholm, Sweden	
60 m hurdles	7.95	Rahib Mammadov	17 January 2015	Catherine's Cup	Kuldiga, Latvia	
High jump	2.08 m	Azer Ahmedov	11 January 2010		Baku, Azerbaijan	
High jump	2.32 m	Valeriy Sereda	25 January 1986		Leningrad, Soviet Union	
Pole vault						
Long jump	7.97 m	Vladimir Tsepelyov	3 March 1978		Moscow, Soviet Union	
Long jump	8.00 m	Vladimir Tsepelyov	6 February 1983		Vilnius, Soviet Union	
Triple jump	17.37 m (Note: outdoor mark ratified as absolute record)	Vasif Asadov	12 February 1988		Volgograd, Soviet Union	
Shot put	16.74 m	Tofig Mammadov	18 January 2014		Baku, Azerbaijan	
Heptathlon						
Heptathlon	60m / Long jump / Shot put / High jump / 60m H / Pole vault / 1000m					
5000 m walk	21:45.66	Sergey Shildkret	13 March 1993	World Championships	Toronto, Canada	
4 × 200 m relay	1:30.8 h	Azerbaijan SSR; O. Berdnikov; F. Tatoyev; A. Pexterev; B. Smolnikov	1983		Baku, Soviet Union	
4 × 400 m relay	3:17.44	Azerbaijan	22 February 2007		Tehran, Iran	

=== Women ===
Event	Record	Athlete	Date	Meet	Place	Ref.
60 m	7.37	Zakiyya Hasanova	16 February 2019	Balkan Indoor Championships	Istanbul, Turkey	
200 m	24.60	Lamiya Valiyeva	17 January 2026	Baku Championships	Baku, Azerbaijan	
400 m	55.78	Lamiya Valiyeva	1 March 2025	10th International Tournament for the Prizes of Olga Rypakova	Oskemen, Kazakhstan	
800 m	2:12.0 h (Note: ratified by federation but not recognised by IAAF)	Ludmila Gorbileva	1987		Simferopol, Soviet Union	
1500 m	4:18.07	Layes Abdullayeva	20 February 2010	Azerbaijani Championships	Baku, Azerbaijan	
3000 m	8:49.65 (Note: outdoor mark ratified as absolute record)	Layes Abdullayeva	12 March 2010	World Championships	Doha, Qatar	
60 m hurdles	8.83	Ekatarina Sokolova	21 February 2015	Balkan Championships	Istanbul, Turkey	
60 m hurdles	8.54 (Note: ratified by federation but not recognised by IAAF)	Ellada Kolesnikova	1990		Zaporizhzhia, Ukraine	
High jump	1.75 m	Irina Bogdanova	1983		Baku, Soviet Union	
High jump	1.89 m	Marina Kuporosova	24 January 1988		Baku, Soviet Union	
Pole vault	3.90 m, (Note: outdoor mark ratified as absolute record) (Note: not ratified by federation but recognised by IAAF)	Yelena Gladkova	11 January 2017	Chelyabinsk Lukashevich & Seryodkin Memorial	Chelyabinsk, Russia	
Pole vault	3.50 m	Yelena Gladkova	21 February 2014		Baku, Azerbaijan	
Long jump	5.90 m	Yekaterina Sariyeva	20 December 2016	"Kids Athletics"	Minsk, Belarus	
Long jump	6.17 m (Note: ratified by federation but not recognised by IAAF)	Galina Tumasova	1985		Baku, Soviet Union	
Triple jump	13.56 m	Yekaterina Sariyeva	26 January 2024	Azerbaijani Championships	Baku, Azerbaijan	
Shot put						
Pentathlon						
Pentathlon	60m H / High jump / Shot put / Long jump / 800m					
3000 m walk	14:32.0 h (Note: ratified by federation but not recognised by IAAF)	Aida Isayeva	1993		Baku, Azerbaijan	
5000 m walk	24.53.2	Valida Abdullyeva	1985		Baku, Soviet Union	
4 × 200 m relay	1:44.3 h		1984		Baku, Soviet Union	
4 × 400 m relay						
