= Clémence Calvin =

French long-distance runner

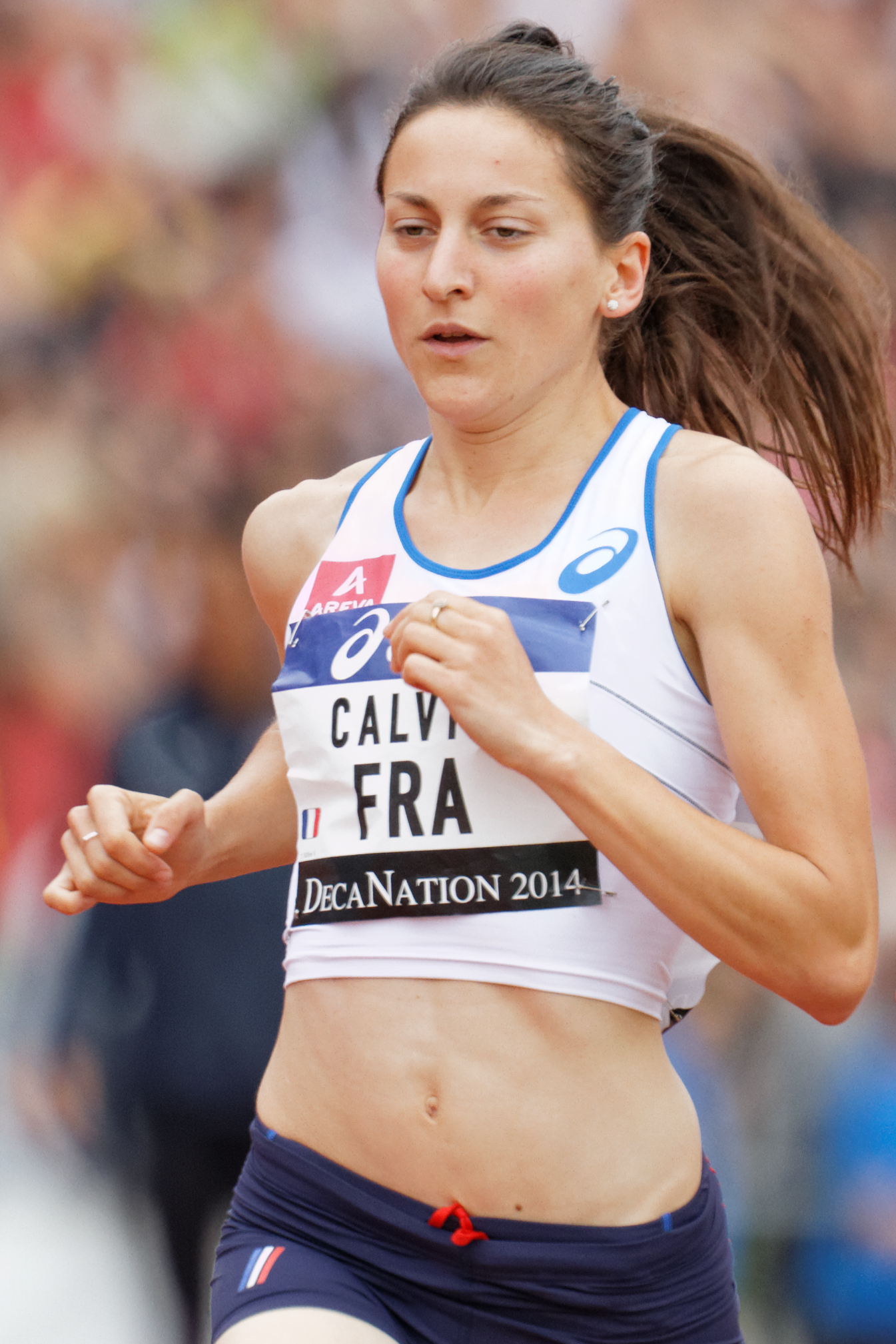
- Calvin competing at the 2014 DécaNation

Personal information
- Born: 17 May 1990 (age 36) Vichy, France

Sport
- Country: France
- Sport: Athletics
- Event: Running
Medal record
Representing France
Women's athletics
European Championships
Silver medal – second place	2014 Zürich	10,000 metres
Silver medal – second place	2018 Berlin	Marathon

Clémence Calvin (born 17 May 1990) is a French runner. She has won silver medal at the 2014 European Championships in Zürich in the 10,000 metres event, behind the winner Jo Pavey.

== Biography ==
She won the team silver medal at the 2013 European Cross Country Championships, at Belgrade, alongside Sophie Duarte, Christine Bardelle and Laila Traby, after having taken 12th place as an individual.

Winner of French National Cross Country Championships at the start of the 2014 season, she won in June 2014 the European Cup 10,000m at Skopje, in Macedonia, in the time of 31:52.86.

In December 2019, Calvin along with her coach and husband (Samir Dahmani) received a 4-year ban from competition for evading a drug test in March 2019. The ban is due to be in force until 17 December 2023.

== Prize List ==
=== International ===
International Events
Date	Competition	Location	Result	Event	Performance
2011	2011 European Athletics U23 Championships	Ostrava	3rd	5 000 m	16:02.07
2013	2013 European Cross Country Championships	Belgrade	2nd	By Team	
2014	European Cup 10,000m	Skopje	1st	10 000 m	31:52.86
2014	2014 European Athletics Championships	Zurich	2nd	10 000 m	32:23.58
2015	2015 European Team Championships	Cheboksary	6th	3 000 m	9:26.18
2015	2015 European Team Championships	Cheboksary	3rd	5 000 m	15:53.28
2015	2015 European Cross Country Championships	Hyères	7th	Individual	26:17.0
2015	2015 European Cross Country Championships	Hyères	2nd	By Team	-
2018	2018 European Athletics Championships	Berlin	2nd	Marathon	2:26:28

=== National ===
- French National Championships :
  - winner of 1500m en 2014
  - winner of 5000m en 2015
- French Cross Country Championships :
  - winner of long course in 2013 and 2016
  - winner of short course in 2014
