= New Taipei City Wan Jin Shi Marathon =

Annual marathon and road race in Taiwan

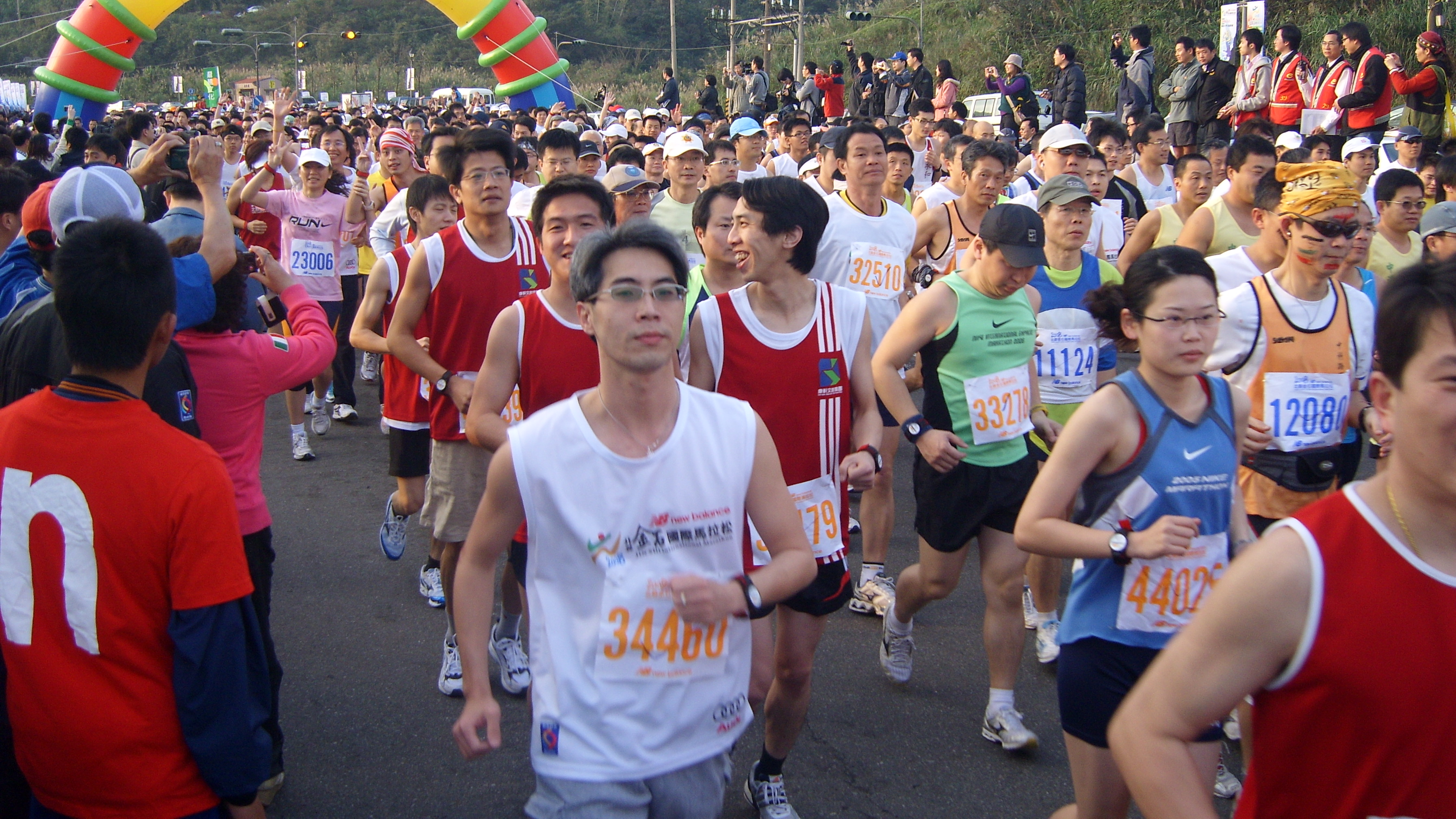
- Runners in the 2008 event
- Date: Mid-March (2025)
- Location: New Taipei City, Taiwan
- Event type: Road race
- Distance: Marathon, 10 km (14 km prior to 2021)
- Established: 1979
- Course records: 14km(F):Kenya Viola Jepchirchir 51:03 (2017); 14km(M):Kenya Tenai Mathayo Kiplimo 45:50 (2017); Marathon(F):Ethiopia Mulu Gadise 2:29:13 (2025); Marathon(M):Kenya Cyrus Mutai 2:09:31 (2024)
- Website: NTC Wan Jin Shi Marathon
- Participants: ~11,000 (2025)

The New Taipei City Wan Jin Shi Marathon (Chinese: 新北市萬金石馬拉松) is the first IAAF Gold Label Road Race in Taiwan.

New Taipei City government started to work with Chinese Taipei Athletics Association in 2014 and applied for IAAF Bronze label. The race was awarded Bronze label in October in 2014, and was upgraded to IAAF Silver Label in December 2017. In November 2022, it was risen to Gold Label by IAAF.

The 2020 edition of the race was cancelled due to the COVID-19 pandemic, with all registered runners automatically deferred to the 2021 edition without additional payment.

== Past winners ==
Key: Course record

Year	Men's Winner	Time (h:m:s)	Women's Winner	Time (h:m:s)
2003	Wu Wen-chien (TPE)	2:30:34	Hsu Yu-fang (TPE)	2:50:24
2004	Jiang Qing-ji (TPE)	2:32:18	Tomoko Sugano (JPN)	2:56:42
2005	Rik Ceulemans (BEL)	2:24:39	Liliya Yadzhak (RUS)	2:50:26
2006	Wu Wen-chien (TPE)	2:28:19	Hsu Yu-fang (TPE)	2:49:47
2007	Wu Wen-chien (TPE)	2:30:11	Wu Wan-ling (TPE)	2:47:08
2008	Rik Ceulemans (BEL)	2:18:13	Hsu Yu-fang (TPE)	2:53:39
2009	Li Zuo-bo (TPE)	2:32:19	Hsu Yu-fang (TPE)	2:49:26
2010	Li Zuo-bo (TPE)	2:26:51	Seiki Kimura (JPN)	2:48:37
2011	Sammy Kiptoo (KEN)	2:20:19	Yuki Saito (JPN)	2:39:51
2012	Richard Mutisya (KEN)	2:24:07	Sayaka Maeda (JPN)	2:52:14
2013	Josphat Too (KEN)	2:19:13	Mercy Too (KEN)	2:38:18
2014	Hassane Ahouchar (MAR)	2:17:17	Kim Jong-hyang (PRK)	2:34:53
2015	Eliud Barngetuny (KEN)	2:13:14	Gladys Kipsoi (KEN)	2:39:32
2016	William Chebor (KEN)	2:13:05	Olha Kotovska (UKR)	2:36:38
2017	Hillary Yego (KEN)	2:17:02	Bayartsogtyn Mönkhzayaa (MGL)	2:38:08
2018	Yuki Kawauchi (JPN)	2:14:12	Nguriatukei Kiyara (KEN)	2:35:57
2019	Mathew Kipsaat (KEN)	2:11:17	Naomi Maiyo (KEN)	2:34:08
2020	cancelled due to the COVID-19 pandemic			
2021	Chiang Chieh-wen (TPE)	2:26:29	Tsai Yun-hsuan (TPE)	2:58:57
2022	Felix Kimutai (KEN)	2:18:24	Motu Megersa (ETH)	2:49:17
2023	Barnabas Kiptum (KEN)	2:11:57	Bekelech Gudeta (ETH)	2:29:25
2024	Cyrus Mutai (KEN)	2:09:31	Fozya Jemal (ETH)	2:38:10
2025	Masresha Bere Bisetegn (ETH)	2:13:47	Mulu Gadise (ETH)	2:29:13

== See also ==
- Taipei Marathon
- List of half marathon races
- List of marathon races in Asia
- List of sporting events in Taiwan
