= 2011 European Athletics U23 Championships – Women's 5000 metres =

The Women's 5000 metres event at the 2011 European Athletics U23 Championships was held in Ostrava, Czech Republic, at Městský stadion on 17 July.

== Medalists ==
Gold	Layes Abdullayeva; Azerbaijan
Silver	Stevie Stockton; United Kingdom
Bronze	Clémence Calvin; France

== Results ==
=== Final ===
17 July 2011 / 16:35

Rank	Name	Nationality	Time	Notes
1st place, gold medalist(s)	Layes Abdullayeva	Azerbaijan	15:29.47	NR
2nd place, silver medalist(s)	Stevie Stockton	United Kingdom	15:58.51	PB
3rd place, bronze medalist(s)	Clémence Calvin	France	16:02.07	
4	Olha Skrypak	Ukraine	16:05.65	
5	Bogdana Mimić	Serbia	16:08.94	
6	Emma Pallant	United Kingdom	16:12.57	
7	Hannah Walker	United Kingdom	16:13.06	
8	Jana Soethout	Germany	16:24.00	PB
9	Yelena Korobkina	Russia	16:27.92	
10	Martina Bařinová	Czech Republic	16:35.82	
11	Matea Matošević	Croatia	16:38.59	
12	Volha Malevich	Belarus	16:40.58	
13	Laura Suur	Estonia	16:47.54	
14	Jill Holterman	Netherlands	16:53.27	
15	Runa Skrove Falch	Norway	17:50.90	
	Maren Kock	Germany	DNF	
	Yekaterina Gorbunova	Russia	DQ	R 32.2.b Doping^{†}
	Meryem Erdoğan	Turkey	DQ	R 32.2.b Doping^{‡}
	Karoline Bjerkeli Grøvdal	Norway	DNS	

^{†}: Yekaterina Gorbunova ranked initially 2nd (15:45.14), but was disqualified later for infringement of IAAF doping rules.
^{‡}: Meryem Erdoğan did not finish, but was disqualified later for infringement of IAAF doping rules.

Intermediate times:
1000m: 2:57.28 Layes Abdullayeva Azerbaijan
2000m: 5:57.76 Layes Abdullayeva Azerbaijan
3000m: 9:06.80 Layes Abdullayeva Azerbaijan
4000m: 12:19.35 Layes Abdullayeva Azerbaijan

== Participation ==
According to an unofficial count, 18 athletes from 14 countries participated in the event.

- Azerbaijan (1)
- Belarus (1)
- Croatia (1)
- Czech Republic (1)
- Estonia (1)
- France (1)
- Germany (2)
- Netherlands (1)
- Norway (1)
- Russia (2)
- Serbia (1)
- Turkey (1)
- Ukraine (1)
- United Kingdom (3)
