= 2009 European Athletics U23 Championships – Women's 5000 metres =

The women's 5000 metres event at the 2009 European Athletics U23 Championships was held in Kaunas, Lithuania, at S. Dariaus ir S. Girėno stadionas (Darius and Girėnas Stadium) on 19 July.

== Medalists ==
Gold	Natalya Popkova; Russia
Silver	Sviatlana Kudzelich; Belarus
Bronze	Emily Pidgeon; United Kingdom

== Results ==
=== Final ===
19 July

Rank	Name	Nationality	Time	Notes
1st place, gold medalist(s)	Natalya Popkova	Russia	15:54.11	
2nd place, silver medalist(s)	Sviatlana Kudzelich	Belarus	16:03.85	
3rd place, bronze medalist(s)	Emily Pidgeon	United Kingdom	16:04.71	
4	Cristina Jordán	Spain	16:08.36	
5	Zsófia Erdélyi	Hungary	16:09.38	
6	Yekaterina Gorbunova	Russia	16:13.86	
7	Anna Nosenko	Ukraine	16:18.63	
8	Cornelia Schwennen	Germany	16:30.09	
9	Marieke Falkmann	Netherlands	16:31.63	
10	Vaida Žūsinaitė	Lithuania	16:35.24	
11	Mareike Schrulle	Germany	16:41.55	
12	Roxana Bârcă	Romania	17:03.84	
13	Laura Costa	Italy	17:05.96	
14	Mónika Nagy	Hungary	17:09.11	
15	Cristiana Frumuz	Romania	18:19.18	
	Yuliya Vasilyeva	Russia	DNF	
	Azra Eminović	Serbia	DNF	
	Rose-Anne Galligan	Ireland	DNS	
	Susanne Lutz	Germany	DNS	
	Giorgia Vasari	Italy	DNS	

== Participation ==
According to an unofficial count, 17 athletes from 12 countries participated in the event.

- Belarus (1)
- Germany (2)
- Hungary (2)
- Italy (1)
- Lithuania (1)
- Netherlands (1)
- Romania (2)
- Russia (3)
- Serbia (1)
- Spain (1)
- Ukraine (1)
- United Kingdom (1)
