= 2024 Dubai Marathon =

26.2 mi (42.195 km) race in Dubai, United Arab Emirates

23rd Dubai Marathon
- Location: Dubai, United Arab Emirates
- Dates: January 7, 2024 (2 years ago)
- Website: https://dubai.r.mikatiming.de/

Champions
- Men: Addisu Gobena (2:05:01)
- Women: Tigist Ketema (2:16:07)

The 2024 Dubai Marathon was the 23rd edition of the annual Dubai Marathon, held on Sunday, January 7, 2024, in Dubai, United Arab Emirates. The race is classified as a Gold Label Road Race by World Athletics.

Ethiopia's Tigist Ketema won the women’s race in her marathon debut with a time of 2:16:07, while fellow Ethiopian Addisu Gobena, also making his marathon debut at just 19 years old, won the men's race in 2:05:01.

== Results ==
=== Men ===
Elite men's top 15 finishers
Position	Athlete	Nationality	Time
1	Addisu Gobena	Ethiopia	2:05:01
2	Lemi Dumecha	Ethiopia	2:05:20
3	Dejene Megersa	Ethiopia	2:05:42
4	Abdi Fufa	Ethiopia	2:06:23
5	Samuel Fitwi	Germany	2:06:27
6	Antenayehu Dagnachew	Ethiopia	2:06:55
7	Douglas Kipsanai Chebii	Kenya	2:08:15
8	Lencho Tesfaye	Ethiopia	2:08:25
9	Bayelign Teshager	Ethiopia	2:08:56
10	Abebaw Dessie	Ethiopia	2:09:09
11	Abebaw Desalew	Ethiopia	2:09:11
12	Asefa Tefera	Ethiopia	2:09:35
13	Gossa Ambelu	Ethiopia	2:10:22
14	Samuel Tsegay Tesfamariam	Sweden	2:11:42
15	Polat Kemboi Arıkan	Turkey	2:12:37

=== Women ===
Elite women's top 15 finishers
Position	Athlete	Nationality	Time
1	Tigist Ketema	Ethiopia	2:16:07
2	Ruti Aga	Ethiopia	2:18:09
3	Dera Dida	Ethiopia	2:19:29
4	Melat Yisak Kejeta	Germany	2:21:47
5	Fozya Jemal	Ethiopia	2:21:53
6	Shitaye Eshete	Ethiopia	2:21:55
7	Atalel Anmut	Ethiopia	2:22:23
8	Betelihem Agenugus	Ethiopia	2:25:57
9	Emebet Niguse	Ethiopia	2:27:12
10	Nurit Shimels	Ethiopia	2:28:28
11	Chernet Misganaw	Ethiopia	2:32:10
12	Anna Yusupova	Azerbaijan	2:42:25 (NR)
13	Leonardo Gonzalez Leyva	Mexico	2:55:55
14	Kate Jordan	United Kingdom	2:58:34
15	Gillian Clarke	Ireland	3:02:16

== Notes ==
- 2024 Dubai Marathon – Full Race via The Dubai Marathon YouTube Channel
