= Athletics at the 2011 Summer Universiade – Women's 5000 metres =

The women's 5000 metres event at the 2011 Summer Universiade was held on 18–20 August.

== Medalists ==
Gold	Silver	Bronze
Binnaz Uslu; Turkey	Sara Moreira; Portugal	Natalya Popkova; Russia

== Results ==
=== Heats ===
Qualification: First 5 in each heat (Q) and the next 5 fastest (q) qualified for the final.

Rank	Heat	Name	Nationality	Time	Notes
1	1	Sara Moreira	Portugal	16:04.68	Q
2	1	Natalya Popkova	Russia	16:06.26	Q
3	1	Roxana Bârcă	Romania	16:06.44	Q
4	1	Fadime Suna	Turkey	16:06.59	Q
5	1	Stevie Stockton	Great Britain	16:07.57	Q
6	2	Triyaningsih	Indonesia	16:23.82	Q
7	1	Mai Ishibashi	Japan	16:26.03	q
8	2	Hanae Tanaka	Japan	16:28.05	Q
9	2	Layes Abdullayeva	Azerbaijan	16:39.31	Q
10	2	Alfiya Khasanova	Russia	16:41.58	Q
11	2	Laura Suur	Estonia	16:47.35	Q
12	2	Vaida Žūsinaitė	Lithuania	16:54.28	q
13	2	Binnaz Uslu	Turkey	16:59.11	q
14	1	Annet Chebet	Uganda	17:03.66	q
15	2	Rosmery Quispe	Bolivia	17:41.11	q, SB
16	1	Chen Xue	China	18:08.14	
17	1	Kristina Dolmatova	Estonia	18:15.75	
18	1	Jayashree Boragi	India	18:20.39	
19	2	Lonah Chepkwony	Kenya	18:54.69	
20	1	Esther Adwubi	Ghana	19:42.37	
21	2	Letebrhan Haylay Gebreslasea	Ethiopia	20:10.47	
22	2	Samkelisiwe Tfwala	Swaziland	21:31.03	
	1	Mary Ann de la Cruz	Philippines	DNF	
	1	Slađana Perunović	Montenegro	DNF	
	2	Vongai Chamunorwa	Zimbabwe	DNF	
	2	Inam Jabbar	Iraq	DNF	
	1	Diana Jerotich Yator	Kenya	DNS	
	2	Hanna Nosenko	Ukraine	DNS	

=== Final ===
Rank	Name	Nationality	Time	Notes
1st place, gold medalist(s)	Binnaz Uslu	Turkey	15:41.15	PB
2nd place, silver medalist(s)	Sara Moreira	Portugal	15:45.83	
3rd place, bronze medalist(s)	Natalya Popkova	Russia	15:52.55	
4	Stevie Stockton	Great Britain	15:59.22	
5	Layes Abdullayeva	Azerbaijan	16:03.13	
6	Hanae Tanaka	Japan	16:04.05	
7	Alfiya Khasanova	Russia	16:10.60	
8	Roxana Bârcă	Romania	16:11.94	
9	Mai Ishibashi	Japan	16:14.58	
10	Triyaningsih	Indonesia	16:26.06	
11	Vaida Žūsinaitė	Lithuania	16:53.15	
12	Laura Suur	Estonia	16:54.95	
13	Annet Chebet	Uganda	17:04.99	
14	Rosmery Quispe	Bolivia	17:24.45	SB
	Fadime Suna	Turkey	DNF	
