= 2009 European Athletics U23 Championships – Women's 10,000 metres =

The women's 10,000 metres event at the 2009 European Athletics U23 Championships was held in Kaunas, Lithuania, at S. Dariaus ir S. Girėno stadionas (Darius and Girėnas Stadium) on 17 July.

== Medalists ==
Gold	Natalya Popkova; Russia
Silver	Zsófia Erdélyi; Hungary
Bronze	Azra Eminović; Serbia

== Results ==
=== Final ===
17 July

Rank	Name	Nationality	Time	Notes
1st place, gold medalist(s)	Natalya Popkova	Russia	33:37.31	
2nd place, silver medalist(s)	Zsófia Erdélyi	Hungary	33:39.89	
3rd place, bronze medalist(s)	Azra Eminović	Serbia	33:47.19	
4	Natalya Puchkova	Russia	33:52.01	
5	Sviatlana Kudzelich	Belarus	34:15.12	
6	Olena Biloshchuk	Ukraine	35:05.50	
7	Vanja Cnops	Belgium	35:19.57	
8	Katarína Berešová	Slovakia	35:26.50	
9	Vaida Žūsinaitė	Lithuania	35:49.48	
10	Anna Holm Jørgensen	Denmark	35:52.56	
11	Martina Celi	Italy	35:57.59	
12	Mónika Nagy	Hungary	36:10.87	
13	Nilay Esen	Turkey	36:14.17	
14	Mélanie Prudent	France	36:14.41	
15	Zita Kácser	Hungary	36:41.33	
16	Janka Zatlúkalová	Slovakia	36:44.37	
17	Giovanna Epis	Italy	36:45.18	
18	Tanja Eberhart	Austria	36:49.18	
19	Matea Matošević	Croatia	38:03.14	
20	Sofia Riga	Greece	38:13.98	
	Giorgia Vasari	Italy	DNF	

== Participation ==
According to an unofficial count, 21 athletes from 15 countries participated in the event.

- Austria (1)
- Belarus (1)
- Belgium (1)
- Croatia (1)
- Denmark (1)
- France (1)
- Greece (1)
- Hungary (3)
- Italy (3)
- Lithuania (1)
- Russia (2)
- Serbia (1)
- Slovakia (2)
- Turkey (1)
- Ukraine (1)
