= 2011 European Athletics U23 Championships – Women's 10,000 metres =

The Women's 10,000 metres event at the 2011 European Athletics U23 Championships was held in Ostrava, Czech Republic, at Městský stadion on 15 July.

== Medalists ==
Gold	Layes Abdullayeva; Azerbaijan
Silver	Lyudmyla Kovalenko; Ukraine
Bronze	Catarina Ribeiro; Portugal

== Results ==
=== Final ===
15 July 2011 / 17:20

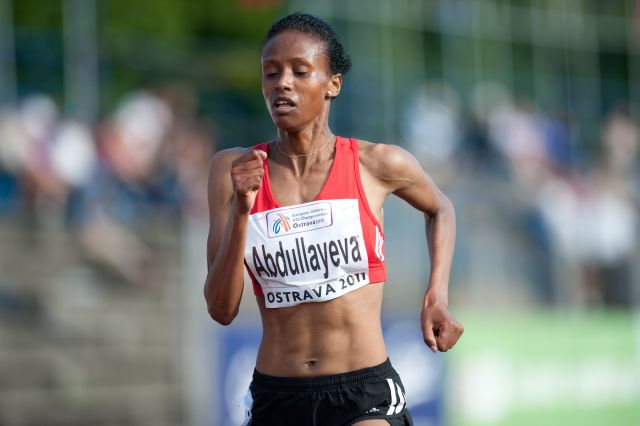
Layes Abdullayeva on her way for the gold medal

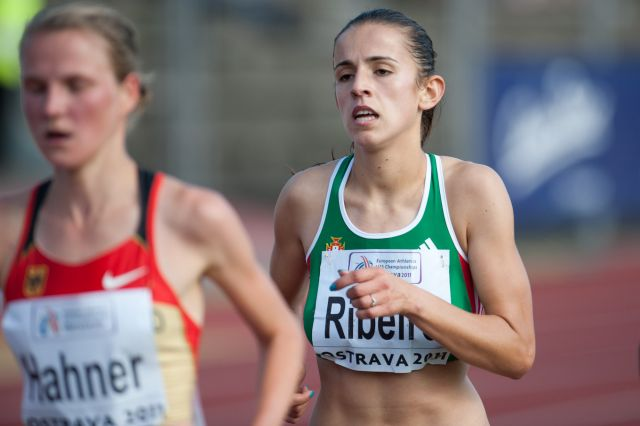
Fourth and third placer, Lisa Hahner and Catarina Ribeiro

Rank	Name	Nationality	Time	Notes
1st place, gold medalist(s)	Layes Abdullayeva	Azerbaijan	32:18.05	CR
2nd place, silver medalist(s)	Lyudmyla Kovalenko	Ukraine	33:35.36	
3rd place, bronze medalist(s)	Catarina Ribeiro	Portugal	34:10.39	PB
4	Lisa Hahner	Germany	34:12.05	PB
5	Ouranía Reboúli	Greece	34:15.15	PB
6	Matea Matošević	Croatia	34:28.94	NR
7	Carla Salomé Rocha	Portugal	34:46.29	
8	Volha Malevich	Belarus	34:46.79	PB
9	Céline Hauert	Switzerland	35:20.38	PB
10	Nina Chydenius	Finland	35:22.59	PB
11	Maor Tyuri	Israel	35:41.03	PB
12	Karolina Waszak	Poland	35:50.11	
13	Tanja Eberhart	Austria	36:15.09	
14	Jennifer Tavé	France	36:33.13	
	Christina Kröckert	Germany	DQ	R 163.6
	Meryem Erdoğan	Turkey	DQ	R 32.2.b Doping^{†}

^{†}: Meryem Erdoğan did not finish, but was disqualified later for infringement of IAAF doping rules.

Intermediate times:
1000m: 3:35.74 Maor Tyuri Israel
2000m: 7:05.66 Maor Tyuri Israel
3000m: 10:22.56 Layes Abdullayeva Azerbaijan
4000m: 13:40.73 Layes Abdullayeva Azerbaijan
5000m: 16:45.36 Layes Abdullayeva Azerbaijan
6000m: 19:52.32 Layes Abdullayeva Azerbaijan
7000m: 22:56.00 Layes Abdullayeva Azerbaijan
8000m: 26:03.92 Layes Abdullayeva Azerbaijan
9000m: 29:11.92 Layes Abdullayeva Azerbaijan

== Participation ==
According to an unofficial count, 16 athletes from 14 countries participated in the event.

- Austria (1)
- Azerbaijan (1)
- Belarus (1)
- Croatia (1)
- Finland (1)
- France (1)
- Germany (2)
- Greece (1)
- Israel (1)
- Poland (1)
- Portugal (2)
- Switzerland (1)
- Turkey (1)
- Ukraine (1)
