= Roxana Rotaru =

Romanian long-distance runner

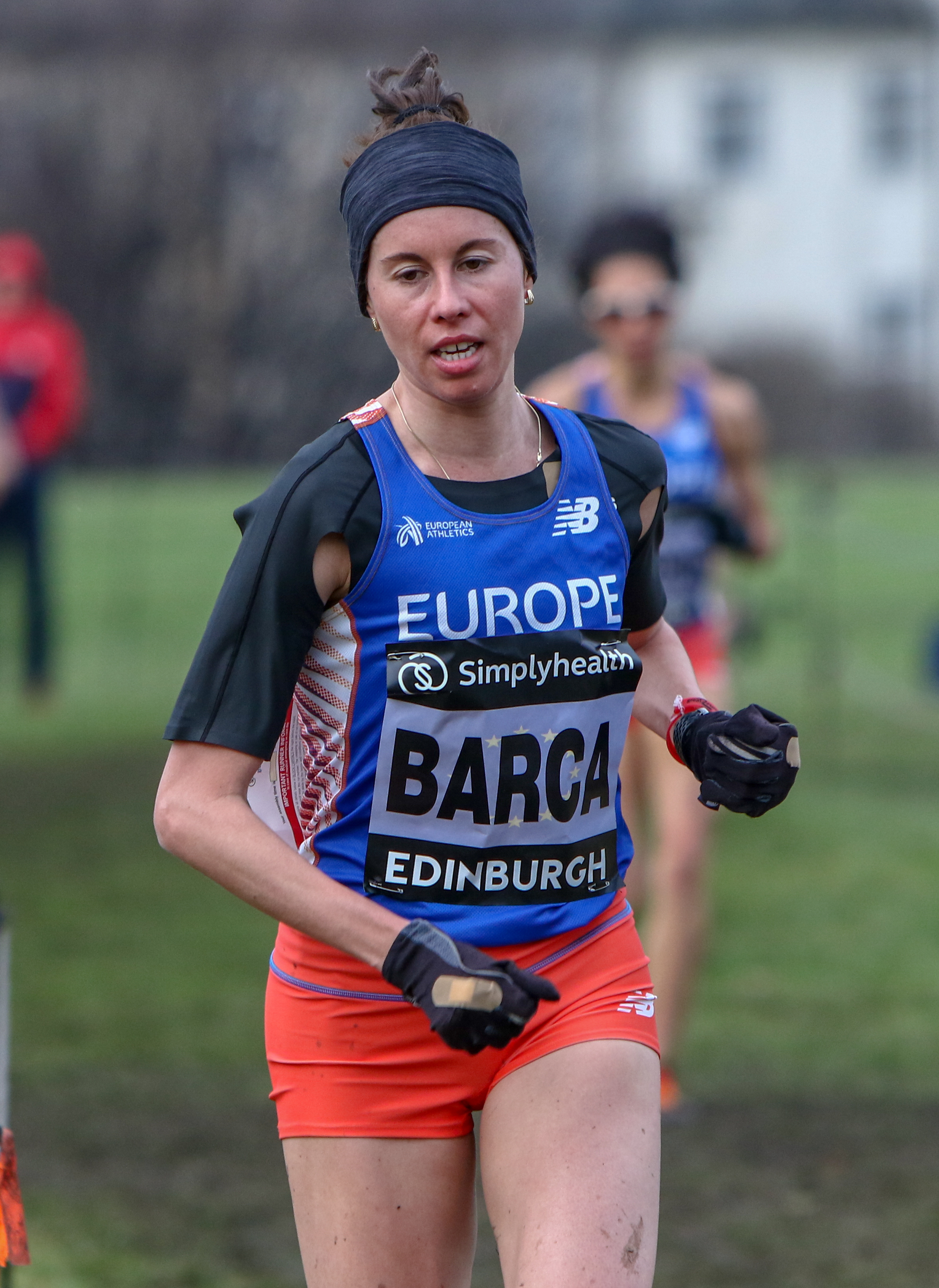
- Bârcă in 2018

Personal information
- Full name: Roxana Elisabeta Rotaru
- Born: Roxana Bârcă; 22 June 1988 (age 38) Bucharest, Romania
- Height: 1.67 m (5 ft 6 in)
- Weight: 46 kg (101 lb) (2013)

Sport
- Country: Romania
- Sport: Track and field
- Event: 5000 m
- College team: Spiru Haret University

Roxana Elisabeta Rotaru, née Bârcă (born 22 June 1988) is a Romanian long-distance runner. She represented her country in the 5000 metres at the 2010 European Athletics Championships. She also competed at the 2011 European Athletics Indoor Championships, coming tenth in the 3000 metres.

She came third at the World University Cross Country Championships in 2012 and was part of the silver medal-winning Romanian team alongside Ancuta Bobocel.

She served a two-year doping ban for the use of a prohibited substance, Methasterone, at the 2013 Summer Universiade, where she originally won the gold medal in the 5000 metres. The ban lasted from 11 July 2013 to 3 September 2015.

== Achievements ==
Year	Competition	Venue	Position	Event	Notes
Representing Romania
2007	European Junior Championships	Hengelo, Netherlands	4th	5000 m	16:46.55
2009	European U23 Championships	Kaunas, Lithuania	12th	5000 m	17:03.84
2010	European Championships	Barcelona, Spain	15th	5000 m	16:06.10
2011	European Indoor Championships	Paris, France	9th	3000 m	9:09.19
2011	Universiade	Shenzhen, China	8th	5000 m	16:11.94
2012	European Championships	Helsinki, Finland	5th	5000 m	15:16.54 (PB)
2012	Olympic Games	London, United Kingdom	34th (h)	5000 m	16:01.04
2013	European Indoor Championships	Gothenburg, Sweden	9th	3000 m	9:10.51
2013	Universiade	Kazan, Russia	–	5000 m	DQ
