= Lemi Dumecha =

Ethiopian long-distance runner

Personal information
- Nationality: Ethiopian
- Born: Lemi Dumecha; 12 September 1995 (age 30)
- Occupation: Long-distance runner
- Years active: 2018–present

Sport
- Country: Ethiopia
- Sport: Athletics
- Event(s): Marathon, Half marathon

Achievements and titles
- Personal bests: Marathon: 2:05:20 (2024); Half marathon: 1:04:23 (2018)

Lemi Dumecha (born 12 September 1995) is an Ethiopian long-distance runner who specializes in the marathon. He is known for his podium finish at the 2024 Dubai Marathon, where he set his personal best of 2:05:20.

== Career ==
Dumecha began his international running career in 2018. His early career included a victory at the 2018 Malaga Marathon, which he won in 2:11:07.

His major breakthrough on the world stage came at the 2024 Dubai Marathon. In a competitive field, Dumecha secured a second-place finish, running a significant personal best of 2:05:20. This performance established him as a world-class marathoner and one of Ethiopia's top competitors in the event.

== Achievements ==
All information from World Athletics profile unless otherwise noted.

Year	Competition	Venue	Position	Event	Notes
2024	Dubai Marathon	Dubai, UAE	2nd	Marathon	2:05:20 (PB)
2023	Maraton BP Castellon	Castellón de la Plana, Spain	2nd	Marathon	2:11:18
2021	Istanbul Marathon	Istanbul, Turkey	13th	Marathon	2:14:33
2018	Malaga Marathon	Málaga, Spain	1st	Marathon	2:11:07
