= 2014 European Athletics Championships – Women's 10,000 metres =

Women's 10,000 metres at the European Athletics Championships

The women's 10,000 metres at the 2014 European Athletics Championships took place at the Letzigrund on 12 August.

The event was run as a straight final. In a slow run, tactical race, 40-year-old British athlete Jo Pavey won the gold medal, timing her push with 400 metres to go, becoming the oldest European athletics champion in the history of the event. French contender Clémence Calvin, who had finally animated the race with three laps remaining, and compatriot Laila Traby completed the podium.

Official Race Video

== Medalists ==
Gold	Joanne Pavey; Great Britain
Silver	Clémence Calvin; France
Bronze	Laila Traby; France

== Records ==
Standing records prior to the 2014 European Athletics Championships
World record	Wang Junxia (CHN)	29:31.78	Beijing, China	8 September 1993
European record	Elvan Abeylegesse (TUR)	29:56.34	Beijing, China	15 August 2008
Championship record	Paula Radcliffe (GBR)	30:01.09	Munich, Germany	6 August 2002
World Leading	Sally Jepkosgei Kipyego (KEN)	30:42.26	Palo Alto, United States	4 May 2014
European Leading	Julia Bleasdale (GBR)	31:42.02	Palo Alto, United States	4 May 2014

== Schedule ==
Date	Time	Round
12 August 2014	20:10	Final

All times are local times (UTC+2)

== Results ==
Rank	Name	Nationality	Time	Note
1st place, gold medalist(s)	Jo Pavey	Great Britain	32:22.29	
2nd place, silver medalist(s)	Clémence Calvin	France	32:23.58	
3rd place, bronze medalist(s)	Laila Traby	France	32:26.03	PB
4	Jip Vastenburg	Netherlands	32:27.37	NUR
5	Sara Moreira	Portugal	32:30.12	
6	Sabrina Mockenhaupt	Germany	32:30.49	
7	Volha Mazuronak	Belarus	32:31.15	PB
8	Fionnuala Britton	Ireland	32:32.45	
9	Krisztina Papp	Hungary	32:32.62	
10	Yelena Nagovitsyna	Russia	32:33.64	
11	Jelena Prokopcuka	Latvia	32:34.03	
12	Dulce Félix	Portugal	32:35.90	
13	Karolina Jarzyńska	Poland	32:40.98	
14	Beth Potter	Great Britain	32:53.17	
15	Almensch Belete	Belgium	33:03.87	
16	Carla Salomé Rocha	Portugal	33:05.49	
17	Lidia Rodríguez	Spain	33:17.39	
18	Gema Barrachina	Spain	33:24.65	
19	Katarína Berešová	Slovakia	33:28.60	
20	Valentina Galimova	Russia	33:36.45	
21	Zsófia Erdélyi	Hungary	33:41.72	
22	Anastasía Karakatsáni	Greece	33:53.00	NUR
23	Lucie Sekanová	Czech Republic	33:57.29	
24	Runa Skrove Falch	Norway	38:06.69	
DNF	Sophie Duarte	France		
DNS	Dolores Checa	Spain		
