= Alice Wright =

British long-distance runner

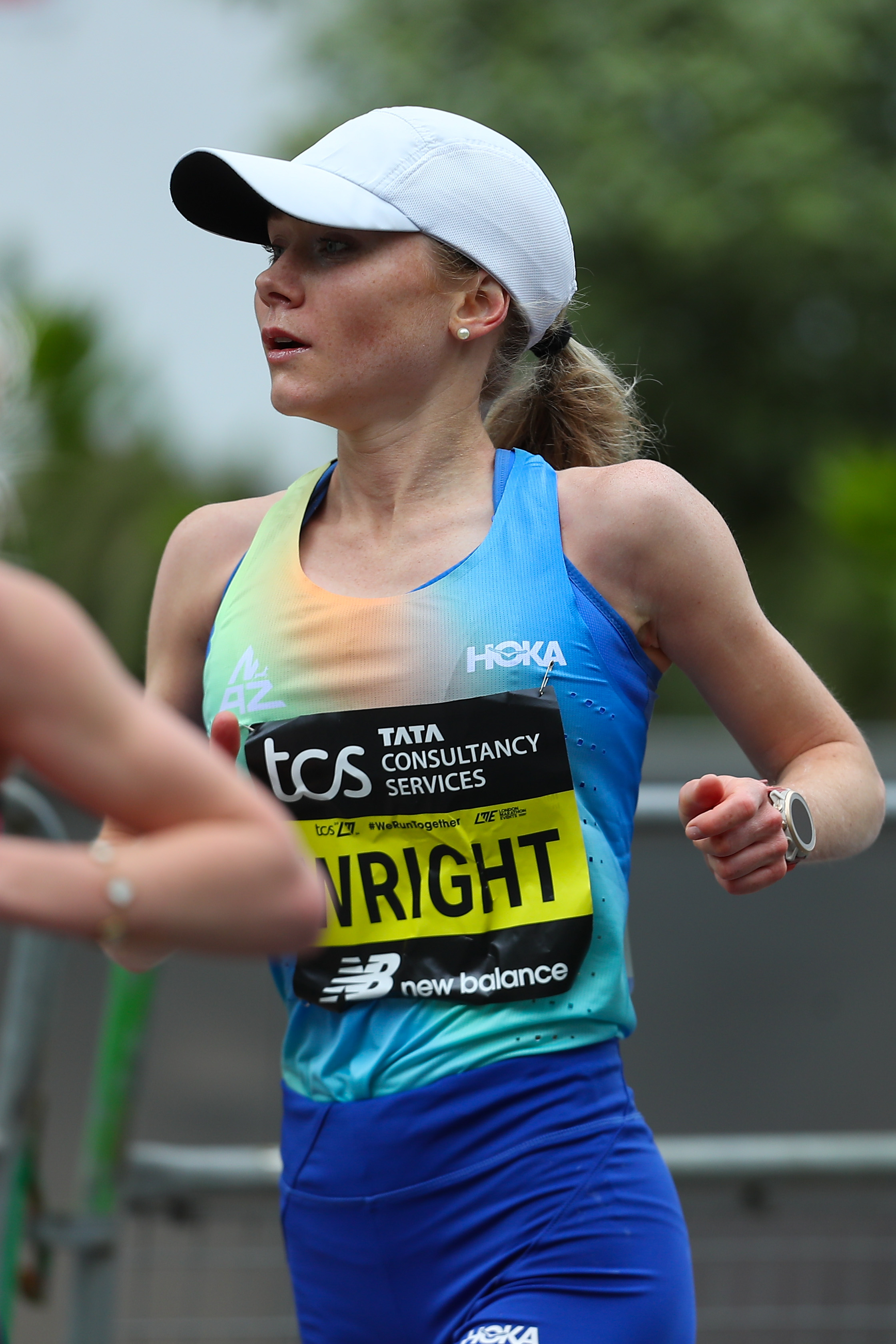
- Alice Wright (London Marathon 2024)

Personal information
- Nationality: British
- Born: 3 November 1994 (age 31) Worcester, England
- Home town: Albuquerque, New Mexico 2013–2018; Flagstaff, Arizona 2018–present
- Height: 1.62 m (5 ft 4 in)

Sport
- Country: England; Great Britain
- Sport: Track and field, Road racing, Cross country
- Events: 5 km, 10 km, Half marathon, Marathon, Cross country
- College team: New Mexico Lobos women's cross country
- Team: Hoka One One; Northern Arizona Elite
- Turned pro: 2018
- Coached by: Ben Rosario

Achievements and titles
- Personal bests: 3000 metres: 9:39; 5000 meters: 15:45.87; 10,000 metres: 31:56.52
Medal record
Women's athletics
Representing Great Britain
Olympic Games
World Outdoor Championships
IAAF World Cross Country Championships
World Indoor Championships
European Athletics Championships
	2018 Berlin, Germany	10,000 metres
Bronze medal – third place	2015 Tallinn, Estonia	U23 10,000 metres
European Cross Country Championships
Bronze medal – third place	2016 Chia, Italy	U23 Cross Country
	2014 Borovets, Bulgaria	U23 Cross Country

Alice Wright (born 3 November 1994) is an English-born long-distance runner.

== Early life and prep ==
Wright represented Worcester AC as a junior athlete. She won the Worcestershire County Championships 3000 meters race in 2011, setting a personal best of 9:39.98 at the distance a few weeks later in Watford.

== NCAA ==
Wright moved to the United States in 2013. In college, Wright was an 11-time NCAA Division I All-American (8 time 1st Team, 3 times 2nd Team) at University of New Mexico.

In 2014, Alice Wright led the New Mexico Lobos women's cross country team to an NCAA Division I cross country team championship title, placing 3rd.

In 2015, Courtney Frerichs's 5th place (19:48.0) finish led the team to an NCAA Division I cross country team title scoring 49 points. Wright finished in 6th place (19:53.1).

In 2016, Wright led the team to a seventh-place finish in the NCAA Division I cross country Championships.

In 2017, the New Mexico Lobos women's cross country again won the NCAA Division I cross country team title, with individual winner Ednah Kurgat taking 1st place (19:19.5). Wright was the team's fourth runner, finishing 14th (19:49.73). The 2017 team was University of New Mexico's 8th-straight top-10 performance at the NCAA Championships — the longest active streak in NCAA Women's Division I Cross Country Championship history.

Representing University of New Mexico
School Year	Mountain West Conference Cross Country	NCAA Cross Country	MWC Track	NCAA Track	MWC Track	NCAA Track
2017-18 Senior	6000 m 5th 20:54.9	6000 m 14th, 19:49.73		5000 9th 16:07.66	5000 2nd 15:54.17	10000 m 4th, 32:17.92
2016-17 Junior	6000 m 1st, 20:02.7	6000 m 19th, 20:13.2	5000 m 1st, 16:22.94	5000 9th 15:56.24	5000 m 1st 16:17.42	10000 m 2nd, 32:42.64
2015-16 Sophomore	6000 m 4th, 22:24.5	6000 m 5th, 19:53.1			5000 m 2nd 16:19.11	10000 m 2nd, 32:46.99
2014-15 Freshman	6000 m 4th, 20:21.2	6000 m 20th, 20:29.1	5000 m 1st, 16:31.85; 5000 m 2nd, 9:42.83	DMR 10th 11:17.98	5000 m 3rd 16:12.76; 10000 m 1st 33:18.25	10000 m 8th, 33:41.86

== Professional ==
In July 2018, Alice Wright moved to Flagstaff, Arizona to train under coach Ben Rosario at Northern Arizona Elite.

In August 2018, Wright placed 6th (later promoted to 5th) while representing Team GB at the 2018 European Athletics Championships in 10,000 metres.

On 12 September 2021, Wright won the Athens Half Marathon in Athens, Greece, in a time of 1:14:53. In November of the same year, Wright broke the British record in the one-hour run on the track, covering 17,044 meters.

In 2022, Wright made her marathon debut at the Chevron Houston Marathon in Houston, Texas, where she finished second in a time of 2:29:08. She then represented Great Britain internationally for the second time at the senior level, finishing 22nd in the women's marathon at the 2022 European Athletics Championships in a time of 2:35:33. In May 2025, Wright won the Epidaurus (Theater-to-Theater) Half Marathon, finishing in 1:22:32 and becoming the first woman to win the race outright, ahead of the entire male field as well.

Year	Competition	Venue	Position	Event	Notes
Representing United Kingdom
2022	2022 European Athletics Championships	Munich, Germany	22nd	Marathon	2:35:33
2018	2018 European Athletics Championships	Berlin, Germany	5th	10,000 m	32:36.45
2016	2016 European Cross Country Championships	Chia, Italy	3rd	Cross Country	19:42
2015	2015 European Athletics U23 Championships	Tallinn, Estonia	3rd	10,000 m	32:46.57
2014	2014 European Cross Country Championships	Borovets, Bulgaria	9th	Cross Country	22:59
