= Monica Mădălina Florea =

Romanian long-distance runner

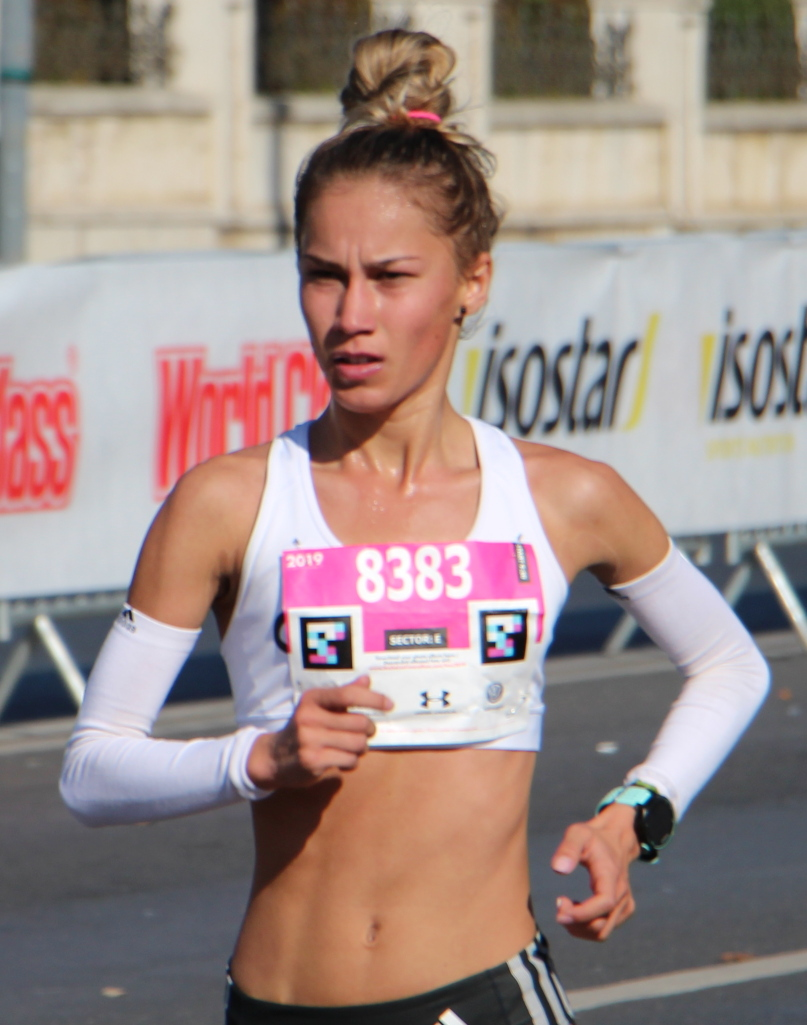
Shown running in 2019

Monica Mădălina Florea is a female long-distance runner from Romania.

In 2015, she had two 4th-place finishes at the 2015 European Athletics U23 Championships - one in the 5,000 meters and one in the 10,000 meters.

Florea finished 67th at the 2013 IAAF World Cross Country Championships.

At the 2016 European Athletics Championships she finished 7th in the women's half marathon.

She has also won the national title in the 10,000 meters.
