= Bekelech Gudeta =

Ethiopian long-distance runner

Personal information
- Nationality: Ethiopian
- Born: October 11, 1997 (age 28)

Sport
- Sport: Athletics
- Event(s): Long-distance running (Marathon, Half Marathon)

Bekelech Gudeta (born 11 October 1997) is an Ethiopian long-distance runner who specializes in marathon and half marathon races. She is a multiple marathon winner, including the 2024 Xiamen Marathon, 2023 New Taipei City Wan Jin Shi Marathon, and 2022 Prague Marathon. Her personal best in the marathon is 2:22:54.

== Career ==
Bekelech began competing internationally in the late 2010s.

In 2018, she placed eighth at the 2018 IAAF World Half Marathon Championships in Valencia, contributing to Ethiopia's team gold medal. Later that year, she ran her then personal best of 1:07:03 at the Copenhagen Half Marathon.

Her key marathon victories include:

- 2022 Prague Marathon: Bekelech claimed victory in Prague with a time of 2:22:56, marking her first major marathon win.
- 2023 New Taipei City Wan Jin Shi Marathon: She secured a dominant win in Taiwan, finishing in 2:29:25 and setting a new course record.
- 2024 Xiamen Marathon: Bekelech won the Xiamen Marathon, setting her personal best in the marathon with a time of 2:22:54.

== Personal bests ==
As of May 2025, Bekelech's personal bests are:

- Half Marathon – 1:06:35 (Istanbul, 27 March 2022)
- Marathon – 2:22:54 (Xiamen, 7 January 2024)
