= Natalya Popkova =

Russian long-distance runner

Natalya Vladimirovna Popkova (Russian: Наталья Владимировна Попкова; born 21 September 1988) is a Russian long-distance runner.

== International competitions ==
Representing Russia
Year	Competition	Venue	Position	Event	Notes
2007	European Junior Championships	Hengelo, Netherlands	2nd	3000 m	9:14.17
2007	European Junior Championships	Hengelo, Netherlands	1st	5000 m	16:08.95
2009	European U23 Championships	Kaunas, Lithuania	1st	5000 m	15:54.11
2009	European U23 Championships	Kaunas, Lithuania	1st	10000 m	33:37.31
2009	World Championships	Berlin, Germany	8th (h)	5000 m	15:32.62
2011	European Indoor Championships	Paris, France	6th	3000 m	9:03.42
2011	Universiade	Shenzhen, China	3rd	5000 m	15:52.55
