= 2011 European Athletics Indoor Championships – Women's 3000 metres =

The women's 3000 metres event at the 2011 European Athletics Indoor Championships was held on March 5–6 with the final being held on March 6 at 15:15 local time.

== Records ==
Standing records prior to the 2011 European Athletics Indoor Championships
World record	Meseret Defar (ETH)	8:23.72	Stuttgart, Germany	3 February 2007
European record	Liliya Shobukhova (RUS)	8:27.86	Moscow, Russia	17 February 2006
Championship record	Fernanda Ribeiro (POR)	8:39.49	Stockholm, Sweden	9 March 1996
World Leading	Sentayehu Ejigu (ETH)	8:30.26	Birmingham, United Kingdom	19 February 2011
European Leading	Helen Clitheroe (GBR)	8:39.81	Birmingham, United Kingdom	19 February 2011

== Results ==
=== Heats ===
First 4 in each heat and 4 best performers advanced to the Final.

Rank	Heat	Name	Nationality	Time	Notes
1	2	Layes Abdullayeva	Azerbaijan	9:00.80	Q
2	2	Helen Clitheroe	Great Britain	9:01.45	Q
3	1	Sultan Haydar	Turkey	9:03.50	Q, PB
4	1	Yelena Zadorozhnaya	Russia	9:04.03	Q
5	1	Dolores Checa	Spain	9:04.06	Q
DQ	1	Olesya Syreva	Russia	~~9:04.06~~	Q, Doping
6	1	Nataliya Tobias	Ukraine	9:05.57	q, PB
7	2	Lidia Chojecka	Poland	9:06.44	Q
8	1	Christine Bardelle	France	9:08.15	q
9	1	Paula González	Spain	9:10.37	q
10	2	Natalya Popkova	Russia	9:13.85	Q
11	2	Roxana Bârcă	Romania	9:17.29	q
12	1	Silvia Weissteiner	Italy	9:19.96	SB
13	2	Sonia Bejarano	Spain	9:28.31	
14	2	Svitlana Shmidt	Ukraine	9:43.62	
	2	Sylwia Ejdys	Poland	DNF	
	2	Alemitu Bekele	Turkey	DNF	Doping
	1	Mary Cullen	Ireland	DNS	

=== Final ===
The final was held at 15:15.

Rank	Name	Nationality	Time	Notes
1st place, gold medalist(s)	Helen Clitheroe	Great Britain	8:56.66	
DQ	Olesya Syreva	Russia	~~8:56.69~~	Doping
2nd place, silver medalist(s)	Lidia Chojecka	Poland	8:58.30	
3rd place, bronze medalist(s)	Layes Abdullayeva	Azerbaijan	9:00.37	SB
4	Dolores Checa	Spain	9:02.18	
5	Nataliya Tobias	Ukraine	9:02.94	PB
6	Natalya Popkova	Russia	9:03.42	
7	Yelena Zadorozhnaya	Russia	9:06.44	
8	Sultan Haydar	Turkey	9:08.84	
9	Roxana Bârcă	Romania	9:09.19	
10	Christine Bardelle	France	9:10.40	
11	Paula González	Spain	9:20.32	
