= Jip Vastenburg =

Dutch long-distance runner

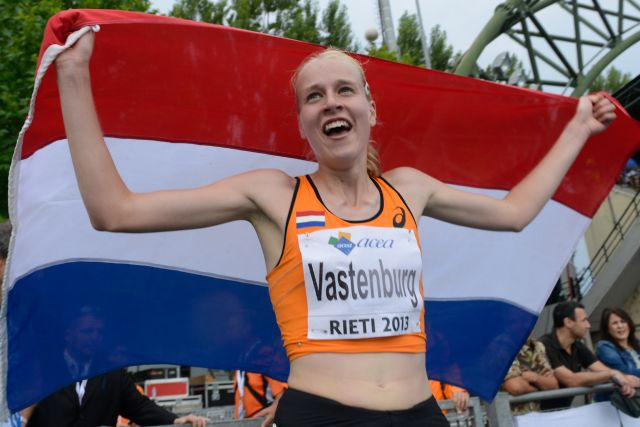
- Jip Vastenburg in 2013

Personal information
- Born: 21 March 1994 (age 32) Loosdrecht, Netherlands
- Height: 1.81 m (5 ft 11 in)
- Weight: 59 kg (130 lb)

Sport
- Sport: Track and field
- Event: long-distance running
- Club: AV'34 Apeldoorn
- Coached by: Johan Voogd

Jip Vastenburg (born 21 March 1994 in Loosdrecht) is a Dutch athlete competing in the long-distance events. She finished fourth in the 10,000 metres at the 2014 European Championships. In addition, she won the gold at the 2015 European U23 Championships.

== Competition record ==
Year	Competition	Venue	Position	Event	Notes
Representing the Netherlands
2011	European Youth Olympic Festival	Trabzon, Turkey	3rd	3000 m	9:39.47
2012	World Junior Championships	Barcelona, Spain	16th	5000 m	16:47.32
2013	European Junior Championships	Rieti, Italy	1st	5000 m	16:03.31
2014	European Championships	Zurich, Switzerland	4th	10,000 m	32:27.37
2015	European U23 Championships	Tallinn, Estonia	1st	10,000 m	32:18.69
2015	World Championships	Beijing, China	11th	10,000 m	32:03.03
2016	European Championships	Amsterdam, Netherlands	8th	10,000 m	32:04.00
2016	Olympic Games	Rio de Janeiro, Brazil	28th	10,000 m	32:08.92
2018	European Championships	Berlin, Germany	14th	10,000 m	33:41.79
2021	European Indoor Championships	Toruń, Poland	–	3000 m	DQ

== Personal bests ==
Outdoor

- 1500 metres – 4:10.11 (Heusden-Zolder 2014)
- 3000 metres – 8:49.50 (Hengelo 2015)
- 5000 metres – 15:15.77 (Heusden-Zolder 2018)
- 10,000 metres – 31:35.48 (Palo Alto 2015)
- Half marathon – 1:13:15 (Hague 2014)
