= Hayle Ibrahimov =

Ethiopian-born Azerbaijani runner

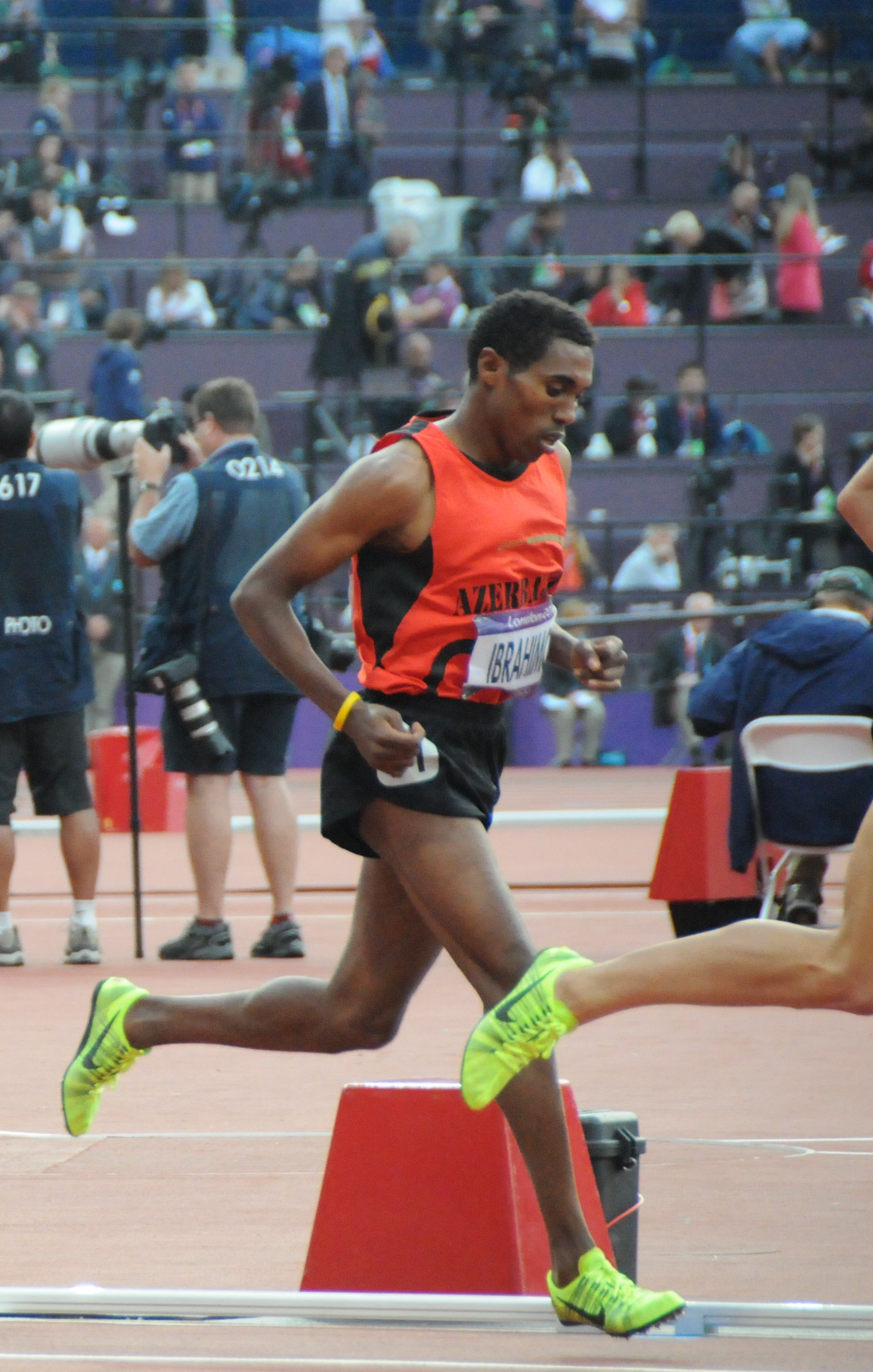
- Hayle Ibrahimov at the 2012 Summer Olympics

Personal information
- Nationality: Azerbaijani
- Born: 18 January 1990 (age 36) Mekele, Ethiopia
- Height: 1.60 m (5 ft 3 in)
- Weight: 63 kg (139 lb)

Sport
- Sport: Track and field
- Events: 1500 metres, 3000 metres, 5000 metres
Medal record
Men's athletics
Representing Azerbaijan
European Championships
| Silver medal – second place | 2014 Zurich | 5000 m |
| Bronze medal – third place | 2010 Barcelona | 5000 m |
European Indoor Championships
| Gold medal – first place | 2013 Gothenburg | 3000 m |
| Silver medal – second place | 2011 Paris | 3000 m |
Universiade
| Gold medal – first place | 2013 Kazan | 5000 m |
| Gold medal – first place | 2015 Gwangju | 5000 m |
Islamic Solidarity Games
| Gold medal – first place | 2013 Palembang | 5000 m |

Hayle Ibrahimov (Tigrinya: ኃይለ ደስታ ሓጎስ, Haile Desta Hagos; Azerbaijani: Hayle İbrahimov); born 18 January 1990) is an Ethiopian-born Azerbaijani international middle and long distance track and field athlete, mainly competing in the disciplines of 3000 metres and 5000 metres. He holds the Azerbaijani records in both these events.

Ibrahimov was the winner of the 3000 m at the European Athletics Indoor Championships in 2013, having been the silver medallist in that event two years earlier. His bronze in the 5000 m 2010 European Athletics Championships was Azerbaijan's first medal in the history of that tournament. He represented his country at the 2012 London Olympics.

== Biography ==
He was born in Mek'ele in Ethiopia's Tigray Region. As a teenager he completed a transfer of allegiance to compete for Azerbaijan from 2009 onwards. In his first year for his new country he set Azerbaijani records in the 3000 metres (7:51.68 min) and the 5000 metres (13:53.60 min), as well as national junior records in events from 1500 m to 10,000 m. Ibrahimov secured his first national title over 5000 m and took a 5000 and 10,000 m gold medal double at the 2009 European Athletics Junior Championships. He was a nominee in the men's European Athletics Rising Star of the Year Award for his achievements in 2009.

At the 2010 IAAF World Indoor Championships he ran in the heats and although he was eliminated in the 3000 m heats he managed a national indoor record of 8:05.43 minutes. On 31 July 2010, he became Azerbaijan's first ever medallist in the athletics by winning bronze at 2010 European Athletics Championships in Barcelona. He ran an Azerbaijani indoor record in the 3000 metres at the BW-Bank Meeting in February 2011, setting a time of 7:42.54 minutes.

On 5 March 2011, he won silver in the 3000 metres at the European Indoor Championships, narrowly losing to Mo Farah. He was the favourite entering the 5000 m at the 2011 European Athletics U23 Championships, but failed to finish the event due to an injury that ruled him out for most of the season. He ran in the heats of the event at the 2012 IAAF World Indoor Championships, but did not progress to the final. Later that year he ran in the 5000 m at 2012 European Athletics Championships (where he came sixth) and at the 2012 London Olympics, managing ninth place. At September's Palio Citta della Quercia he ran a meet record and Azerbaijani best of 13:11.34 minutes for the 5000 m. He also came eighth in the under-23 section of the 2012 European Cross Country Championships that year.

At the start of 2013 he improved his indoor national record three times, culminating in a run of 7:39.59 minutes at the XL Galan. On 2 March 2013, he won gold in the 3000 metres at the European Indoor Championships. Another national record came at the Doha Diamond League meeting in May, where he ran 7:34.57 minutes for the 3000 metres. In 2013 he won the gold medal at the Universiade, with a new Games record, a title he defended in 2015.

He won the silver medal in the 5000 m at the 2014 European Championships. In 2016, he again represented Azerbaijan at the Olympics.

== Personal bests ==
| Distance | Time (min) | Location | Date |
|---|---|---|---|
| 1500 m | 3:44.76 | Baku, Azerbaijan | 28 June 2009 |
| 3000 m | 7:34.57 | Doha Diamond League | 10 May 2013 |
| 5000 m | 13:09.17 | Zürich Diamond League | 28 August 2014 |
| 10,000 m | 30:06.64 | European Junior Championships | 23 July 2009 |
| 3000 m (indoor) | 7:39.59 | XL Galan | 21 February 2013 |
