= Sviatlana Kudzelich =

Belarusian long-distance runner

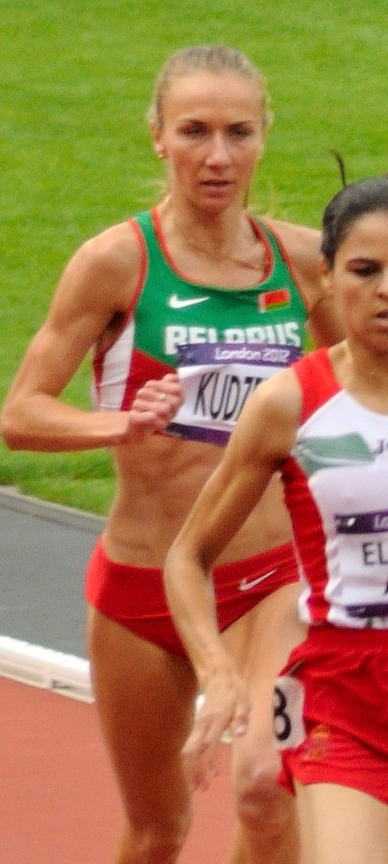
- Sviatlana Kudzelich at the 2012 Summer Olympics

Personal information
- Born: May 7, 1987 (age 39)
- Height: 1.7 m (5 ft 7 in)
- Weight: 51 kg (112 lb)

Sport
- Country: Belarus
- Sport: Track and field
- Event: 3000m steeplechase

Sviatlana Mikhailauna Kudzelich (Belarusian: Святлана Міхайлаўна Кудзеліч; born May 7, 1987, in Pinsk) is a Belarusian long-distance runner. She competed at the 2012 and 2016 Summer Olympics. Originally the silver medalist, in January 2024, following the disqualification for doping of Yelena Korobkina, Kudzelich was acknowledged as the 2015 European indoor champion over 3000 metres.

Until September 2020, she worked in the Ministry of Emergency Situations as an inspector for training and sports in the sector of ideological work and staffing as a senior lieutenant. During the protests in Belarus on August 18, 2020, together with other Belarusian athletes, she signed an open letter condemning violence in the country and demanding new presidential elections. She was subsequently fired from the Ministry of Emergency Situations and deprived of her salary. She was excluded from the national team too. Her husband and coach Igar Zhavaranak was also repressed by Lukashenko's regime as his contract was not prolonged. However, the couple continued preparing for the 2020 Summer Olympics on their own.

== International competitions ==
Year	Competition	Venue	Position	Event	Notes
Representing Belarus
2009	European U23 Championships	Kaunas, Lithuania	2nd	5000 m	16:03.85
2009	European U23 Championships	Kaunas, Lithuania	5th	10,000 m	34:15.12
2010	European Championships	Barcelona, Spain	8th	10,000 m	33:31.33
2012	European Championships	Helsinki, Finland	–	3000 m s'chase	DQ
2012	Olympic Games	London, United Kingdom	34th (h)	3000 m s'chase	9:54.77
2014	European Championships	Zürich, Switzerland	4th	3000 m s'chase	9:30.99
2015	European Indoor Championships	Prague, Czech Republic	1st	3000 m	8:48.02
2015	World Championships	Beijing, China	—	3000 m s'chase	DNF
2016	Olympic Games	Rio de Janeiro, Brazil	22nd (h)	3000 m s'chase	9:32.93
2017	European Indoor Championships	Belgrade, Serbia	13th (h)	3000 m	9:03.21
2018	European Championships	Berlin, Germany	7th	10,000 m	32:46.34
2018	European Championships	Berlin, Germany	23rd (h)	3000 m s'chase	9:47.89
2019	World Championships	Doha, Qatar	32nd	Marathon	3:00:38
