= Ourania Rebouli =

Greek long-distance runner

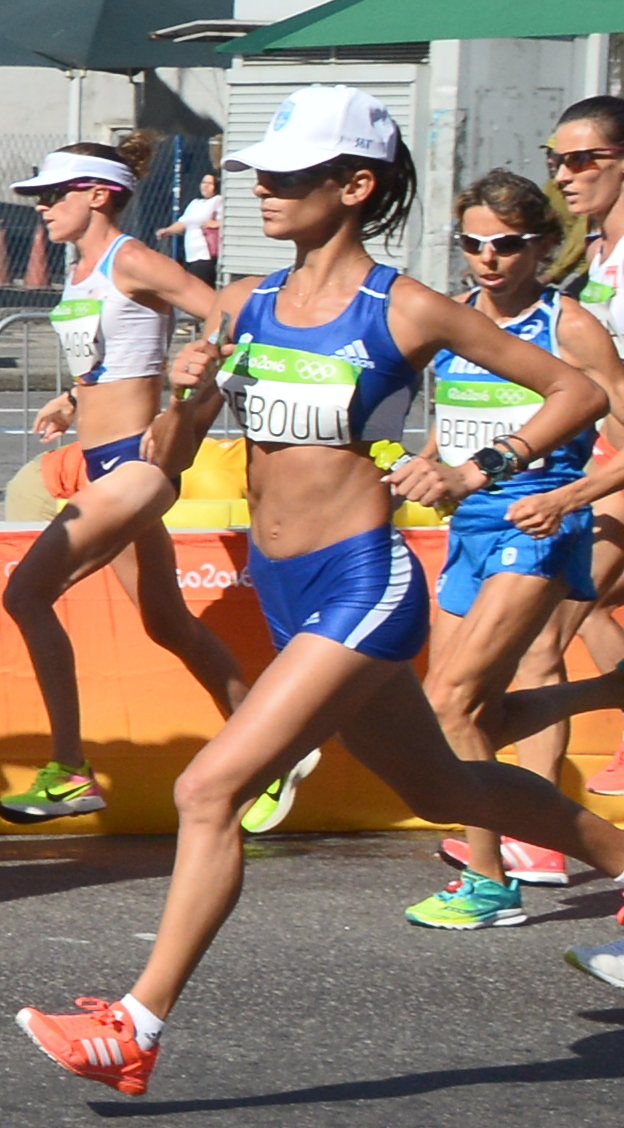

Personal information
- Nationality: Greek
- Born: 16 May 1989 (age 37) Leros, Greece
- Height: 164 cm (5 ft 5 in)
- Weight: 49 kg (108 lb)

Sport
- Country: Greece
- Sport: Athletics
- Events: Marathon; Half Marathon; 10.000 m

Achievements and titles
- Personal bests: 2:39:52; 1:11:52 NR; 34:06.80

Ourania Rebouli (Greek: Ουρανία (Ράνια) Ρεμπούλη; born 16 May 1989 in Leros) is a Greek long-distance runner. She competed in the half marathon at the 2016 European Athletics Championships, finishing in the sixth place.

== Competition record ==
Year	Competition	Venue	Position	Event	Notes
2011	European U23 Championships	Ostrava, Czech Republic	5th	10,000	34:15.15 PB
2013	Mediterranean Games	Mersin, Turkey	4th	5,000	16:21.45
2016	European Championships	Amsterdam, Netherlands	6th	Half Marathon	1:11:52 NR
2016	Olympic Games	Rio de Janeiro, Brazil	88th	Marathon	2:46:32
2016	Athens Classic Marathon	Athens, Greece	3rd	Marathon	2:49:21
2018	European Championships	Berlin, Germany	36th	Marathon	2:44:32
