= 2010 World Junior Championships in Athletics – Women's 3000 metres =

The women's 3,000 metres at the 2010 World Junior Championships in Athletics was held at the Moncton 2010 Stadium on 19 July.

== Medalists ==
Gold	Silver	Bronze
Mercy Cherono; Kenya	Emebet Anteneh; Ethiopia	Layes Abdullayeva; Azerbaijan

== Records ==
Prior to the competition, the existing world junior and championship records were as follows.

	Name	Nationality	Time	Location	Date
World junior record	Zola Budd	(United Kingdom) Great Britain	8:28.83	Rome	September 7, 1985
Championship record	Zhang Linli	China	8:46.46	Seoul	September 20, 1992

no new records were established during the competition.

== Results ==
Rank	Name	Nationality	Time	Notes
1st place, gold medalist(s)	Mercy Cherono	Kenya	8:55.07	WJL
2nd place, silver medalist(s)	Emebet Anteneh	Ethiopia	8:55.24	PB
3rd place, bronze medalist(s)	Layes Abdullayeva	Azerbaijan	8:55.33	NR,NJR
4	Purity Cherotich Rionoripo	Kenya	8:56.91	PB
5	Tejitu Daba	Bahrain	9:01.22	NJR
6	Genet Yalew	Ethiopia	9:01.75	PB
7	Jennifer Wenth	Austria	9:09.20	NJR
8	Hannah Newbould	New Zealand	9:15.68	PB
9	Jordan Hasay	United States	9:15.78	PB
10	Emily Sisson	United States	9:16.80	PB
11	Emelia Gorecka	United Kingdom	9:18.43	
12	Haruka Kyuma	Japan	9:22.13	
13	Karla Díaz	Mexico	9:23.22	NJR
14	Tuğba Karakaya	Turkey	9:23.65	PB
15	Gulshat Fazlitdinova	Russia	9:25.32	
16	Laura Nagel	New Zealand	9:25.91	PB
17	Mojie Cao	China	9:27.96	
18	Kanako Fujiishi	Japan	9:28.04	SB
19	Mary Naali	Tanzania	9:42.51	PB
20	Esma Aydemir	Turkey	9:43.03	
21	Laura Galván	Mexico	9:47.09	
22	Caroline Pfister	Canada	9:47.55	SB

Key: NJR = National junior record, PB = Personal best, SB = Seasonal best, WJL = World junior leading

== Participation ==
According to an unofficial count, 22 athletes from 15 countries participated in the event.

- Austria (1)
- Azerbaijan (1)
- Bahrain (1)
- Canada (1)
- China (1)
- Ethiopia (2)
- Japan (2)
- Kenya (2)
- Mexico (2)
- New Zealand (2)
- Russia (1)
- Tanzania (1)
- Turkey (2)
- United Kingdom (1)
- United States (2)
