= 2015 European Athletics U23 Championships – Women's 10,000 metres =

The women's 10,000 metres event at the 2015 European Athletics U23 Championships was held in Tallinn, Estonia, at Kadriorg Stadium on 10 July.

== Medalists ==
Gold	Jip Vastenburg; Netherlands
Silver	Rhona Auckland; United Kingdom
Bronze	Alice Wright; United Kingdom

== Results ==
=== Final ===
10 July

Rank	Name	Nationality	Time	Notes
1st place, gold medalist(s)	Jip Vastenburg	Netherlands	32:18.69	
2nd place, silver medalist(s)	Rhona Auckland	United Kingdom	32:22.79	PB
3rd place, bronze medalist(s)	Alice Wright	United Kingdom	32:46.57	PB
4	Monica Madalina Florea	Romania	32:55.08	PB
5	Nina Savina	Belarus	33:37.99	
6	Emine Hatun Tuna	Turkey	34:10.06	
7	Rebecca Straw	United Kingdom	34:11.69	
8	Militsa Mircheva	Bulgaria	34:13.36	
9	Sevilay Eytemiş	Turkey	34:16.21	
10	Isabell Teegen	Germany	34:36.91	
11	Alena Kudashkina	Russia	34:37.87	SB
12	Ana Vega	Spain	34:38.76	PB
13	Beatriz Álvarez	Spain	34:46.20	PB
14	Meri Rantanen	Finland	34:46.99	PB
15	Heleene Tambet	Estonia	36:29.80	

== Participation ==
According to an unofficial count, 15 athletes from 11 countries participated in the event.

- Belarus (1)
- Bulgaria (1)
- Estonia (1)
- Finland (1)
- Germany (1)
- Netherlands (1)
- Romania (1)
- Russia (1)
- Spain (2)
- Turkey (2)
- United Kingdom (3)
