= 2022 New Taipei City Wan Jin Shi Marathon =

2022 marathon race in New Taipei City

- Date: 20 March 2022
- Location: Wanli District, New Taipei City; Republic of China (Taiwan)
- Event type: Road running
- Distance: Challenge run（10KM） Marathon（42.195KM）
- Primary sponsor: Fubon Financial Holding Co. Mizuno; Acer Inc. Pacific Construction Co., Ltd.
- Course records: Challenge run： Lee Li-chun (Men)：31:40; Lai Ting-Hsuan (Women)：36:09; Marathon： Kimutai Felix (Men)：2:18:24; Gedefa Motu Megersa (Women)：2:49:17
- Website: https://wanjinshi-marathon.com.tw

The 2022 New Taipei City Wan Jin Shi Marathon (Chinese: 2022年新北市萬金石馬拉松) was the twentieth edition of the annual marathon race in New Taipei City, the competition was held on Sunday 20 March 2022 and around 11,000 people join the races. The marathon events were won by Kenyan Felix Kimutai and Ethiopian Motu Megersa, Taiwanese runners Chou Ting-Yin and Lee Jia-Mei were the domestic first place.

== Background ==
On 25 October 2021, New Taipei City Government held the registration announcement press conference, the logo and slogan of the 2022 race are first in public. The slogan is "One of Us".

=== Prize ===
Ranking/ Group	Marathon Unit: USD	Challenge run Unit: NTD
Champion	US$30,000 (Note: Smash the race record is able to gain US$10,000 besides prize.) (Note: Marathon records： Men is 2:11:17（Record smasher: Mathew Kipsaat from Kenya in 2019.） Women is 2:34:08（Record smasher: Naomi Jepkogei Maiyo from Kenya in 2019.）)	NT$10,000
2nd	US$20,000	NT$9,000
3rd	US$10,000	NT$8,000
4th	US$5,000	NT$7,000
5th	US$4,000	NT$6,000
6th	US$3,000	NT$5,000
7th	US$2,000	NT$4,000
8th	US$1,500	NT$3,000
9th	US$1,200	NT$2,000
10th	US$1,000	NT$1,000
Remark	Top 3 in the marathon and challenge run was able to receive a Garmin Forerunner smartwatch.	

=== Invited elite runners ===
Men	Player	Nationality	Group	Personal best	World ranking
Men	Gizaw Bekele Megerssa	Ethiopia	Marathon	2:08:03	355
Men	Justus Kipkogei Kangogo	Kenya	Marathon	2:13:34	360
Men	Felix Kimutai	Kenya	Marathon	2:09:23	28
Men	Stephen Chebogut	Kenya	Marathon	2:05:52	120
Women	Player	Nationality	Group	Personal best	World ranking
Women	Motu Megersa	Ethiopia	Marathon	2:27:48	403

== Media ==
External videos
- "TVBS live broadcast".
- "Official YouTube broadcast (Mute)".
- "Highlight".

== New Taipei Sports Party ==
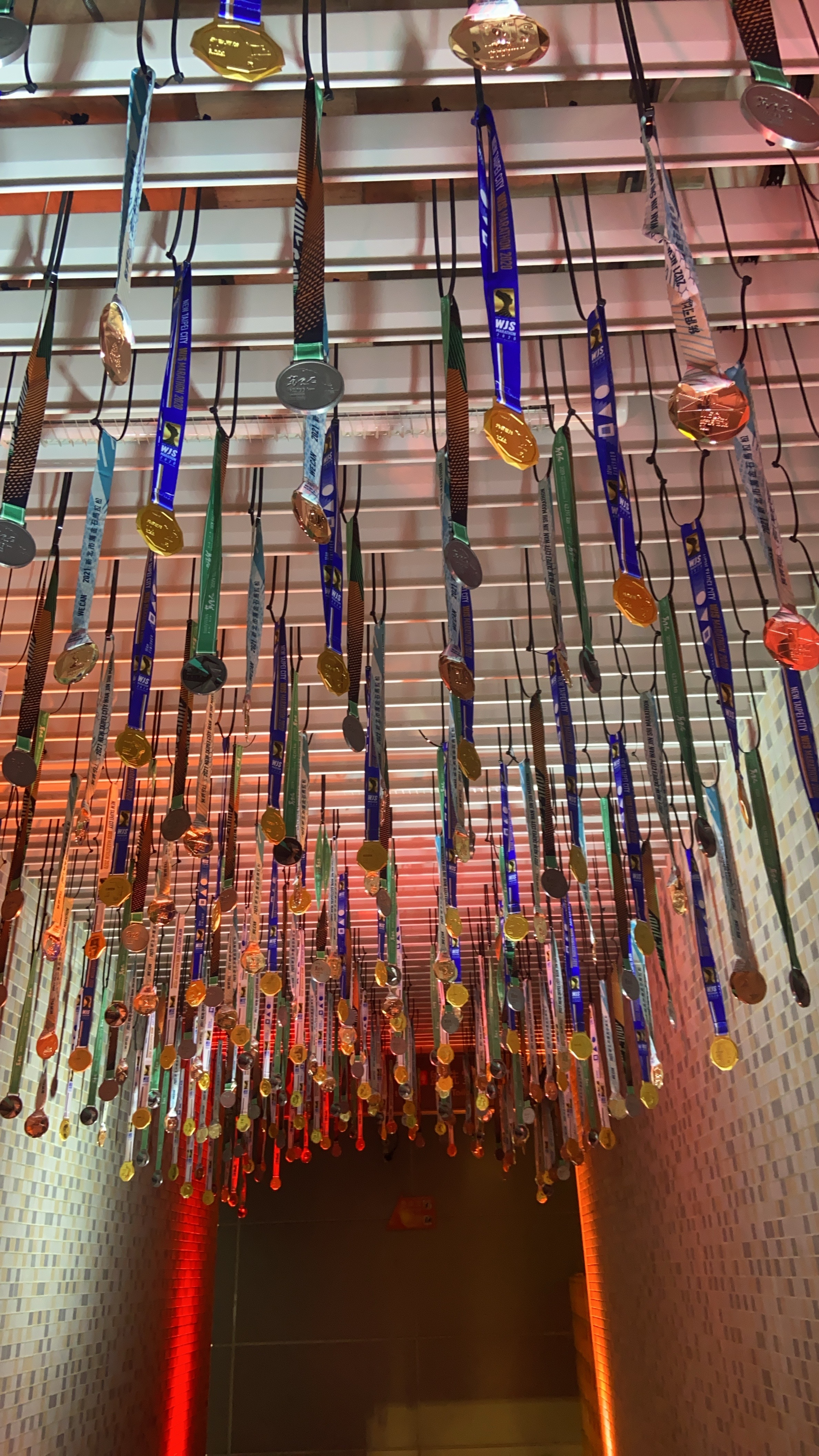
Finisher medal tunnel in the 2022 WJS Marathon expo

To celebrate the twentieth anniversary of the race, New Taipei City Government, Sports Office named the marathon expo as "Go Pai! New Taipei Sports Party". There had a city image public art using wine basket and the tunnel of finisher medals in previous years WJS Marathon on this three day expo.

Two professional basketball teams set in New Taipei City (Kings, CTBC DEA) were also invited in this expo, and held a small fan meeting.

== See also ==
- New Taipei City Wan Jin Shi Marathon
