= Hsu Yu-fang =

Taiwanese long-distance runner

Hsu Yu-Fang
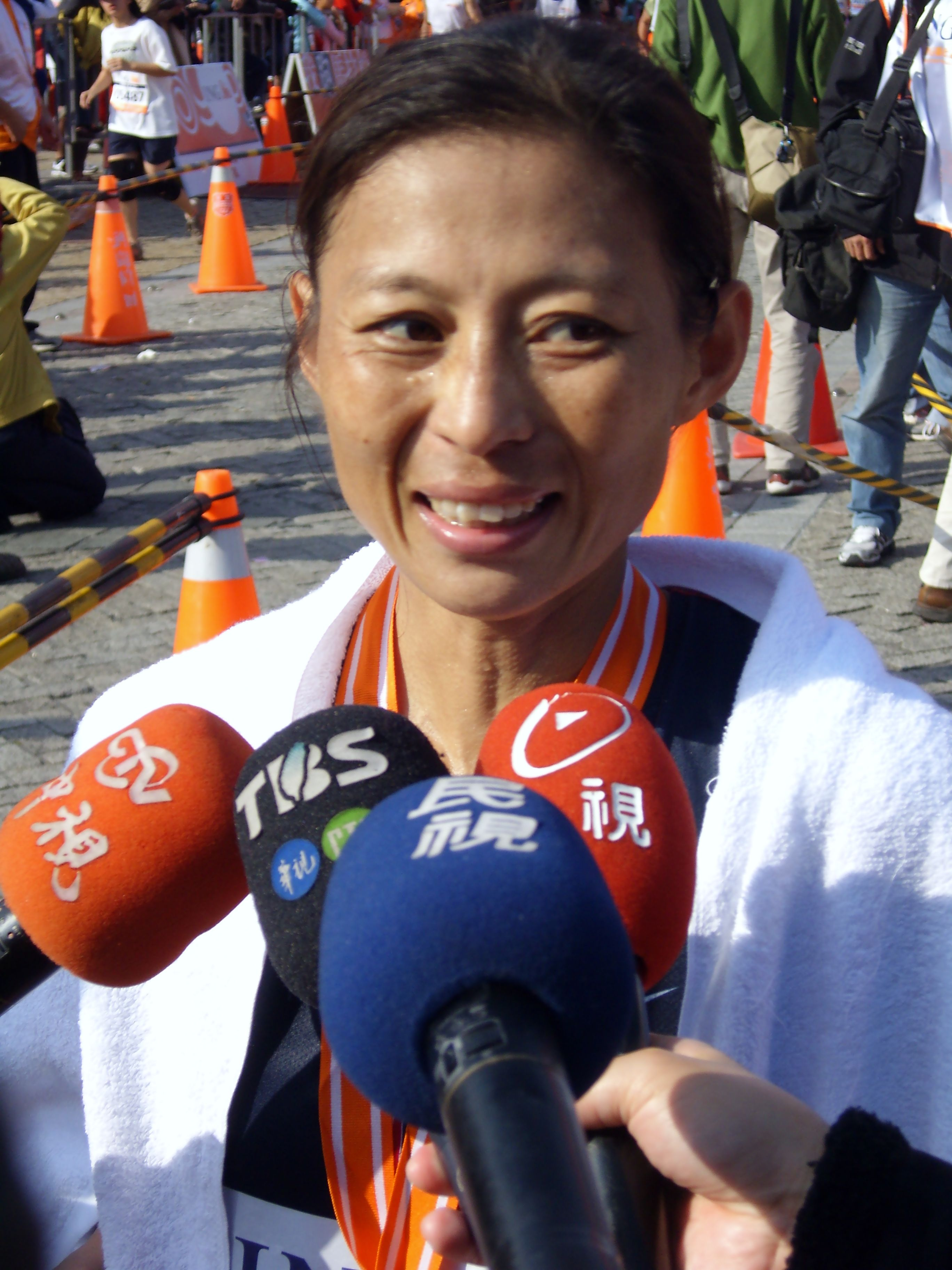
- 2007 ING Taipei Marathon

Personal information
- Born: 2 February 1974 (age 52)

Sport
- Country: Chinese Taipei
- Sport: Track and field
- Event: long-distance running
- Updated on 2 September 2015

Hsu Yu-fang (Chinese: 許玉芳; born 2 February 1974) is a female Taiwanese long-distance runner. She competed in the marathon event at the 2004 Olympics and the 2015 World Championships in Athletics.

== Doping ban ==
Hsu tested positive for EPO at the National Games in Changhua, Taipei, on 23 October 2011 and was subsequently banned from sports for two years. The ban ended 22 October 2013.
