= Aida İsayeva =

Azerbaijani racewalker

Personal information
- Nationality: Azerbaijani
- Born: 12 September 1973 (age 53)

Sport
- Sport: Athletics
- Event: Racewalking

Aida İsayeva (born 12 September 1973) is an Azerbaijani racewalker. She competed in the women's 20 kilometres walk at the 2000 Summer Olympics.
