= Zsófia Erdélyi =

Hungarian long-distance runner

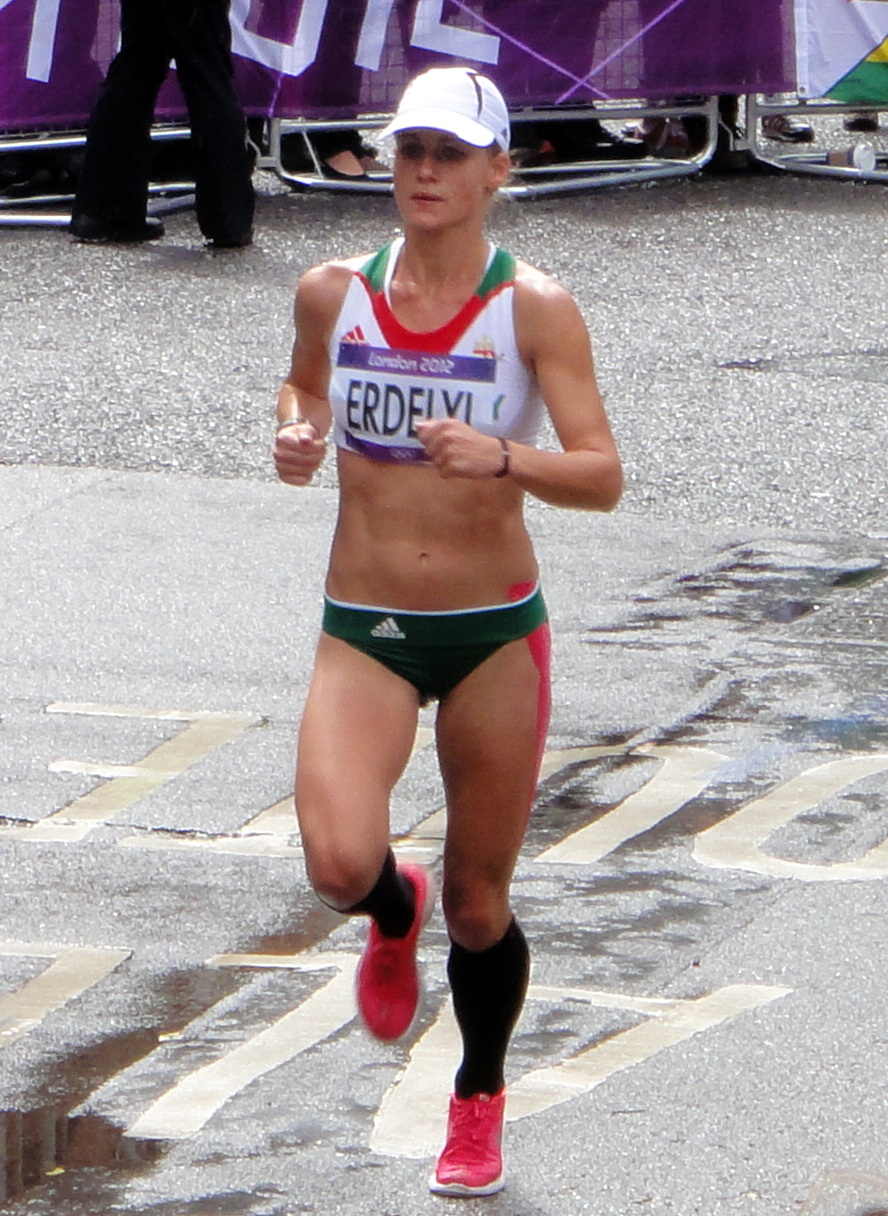
- Erdélyi in the Marathon at the 2012 Olympics in London

Personal information
- Born: December 10, 1987 (age 38)
- Height: 1.63 m (5 ft 4 in)
- Weight: 53 kg (117 lb)

Sport
- Country: Hungary
- Sport: Athletics
- Event: Marathon
- College team: University of Southern California

Achievements and titles
- Personal best(s): 5000m: 15:51.49 10,000m: 32:47.96; 3000mSC: 10:01.99; Half Marathon: 1:14:01; Marathon: 2:36:56

Zsófia Erdélyi (born 10 December 1987 in Budapest) is a Hungarian long-distance runner.

Erdélyi ran 2:39:04 and placed 52nd at Athletics at the 2016 Summer Olympics – Women's marathon.

Hungary at the 2016 European Athletics Championships 2016 European Athletics Championships – Women's half marathon in 1:21:32.

1:15:25 in 2015 Vienna City Half-Marathon.

Erdélyi finished 21st in the 2014 European Athletics Championships – Women's 10,000 metres.
Hungary at the 2014 Summer Youth Olympics Athletics at the 2014 Summer Youth Olympics Athletics at the 2014 Summer Youth Olympics – Girls' 2000 metre steeplechase

She competed in the marathon at the 2012 Summer Olympics, placing 92nd with a time of 2:44:45.

Zsofia ran 2:48:58 to win 2011 Rock 'n' Roll Las Vegas Marathon.

Hungary at the 2010 European Athletics Championships

2009 European Athletics U23 Championships – Women's 10,000 metres

2007 European Athletics U23 Championships – Women's 5000 metres 2007 European Athletics U23 Championships – Women's 10,000 metres

Zsofia ran 10:41.71 to place 12th at 2006 World Junior Championships in Athletics – Women's 3000 metres steeplechase.

Zsófia is the ninth USC cross country runner to qualify for the NCAA Championships.
