= Ekaterina Ishova =

Russian runner (born 1989)

Ekaterina Ishova, née Ekaterina Gorbunova, (Russian: Екатерина Юрьевна Ишова; 17 January 1989) is a Russian middle- and long-distance runner.

At the start of her career, she mainly competed in cross country running events. She was 63rd at the 2006 IAAF World Cross Country Championships. At the European Cross Country Championships she was a junior silver medallist in 2006 and 2007 before leading the Russian junior women to bronze with a seventh place at the 2008 European Cross Country Championships.

Around 2008, she began to move towards distance track running. At the 2008 World Junior Championships in Athletics she ranked in the top eight in both the 1500 metres and the 3000 metres. Going up an age category, she placed sixth in the 5000 metres at the 2009 European Athletics U23 Championships. A silver medal in that event came at the 2011 European Athletics U23 Championships, where she was second only to Ethiopian-Azerbaijani runner Layes Abdullayeva.

In July she ran a personal best of 4:01.02 minutes at the Barcelona Meeting, setting a meet record and placing herself in the top three fastest runners that year. She claimed a 1500 m bronze at the Universiade. Her senior debut came at the 2012 European Athletics Championships, where she placed fourth, slightly behind Ukraine's Anna Mishchenko.

After retrospective analysis, her drug test immediately prior to the 2011 European U23 Championships was found to be adverse and her results were annulled for doping from 12 July 2011 onwards (meaning the loss of her European and Universiade medals). Given the circumstances, her ban also extended for a further two years, meaning she was ruled ineligible until October 2015.

== See also ==
- List of doping cases in athletics
