= Rosemary Quispe =

Bolivian long-distance runner

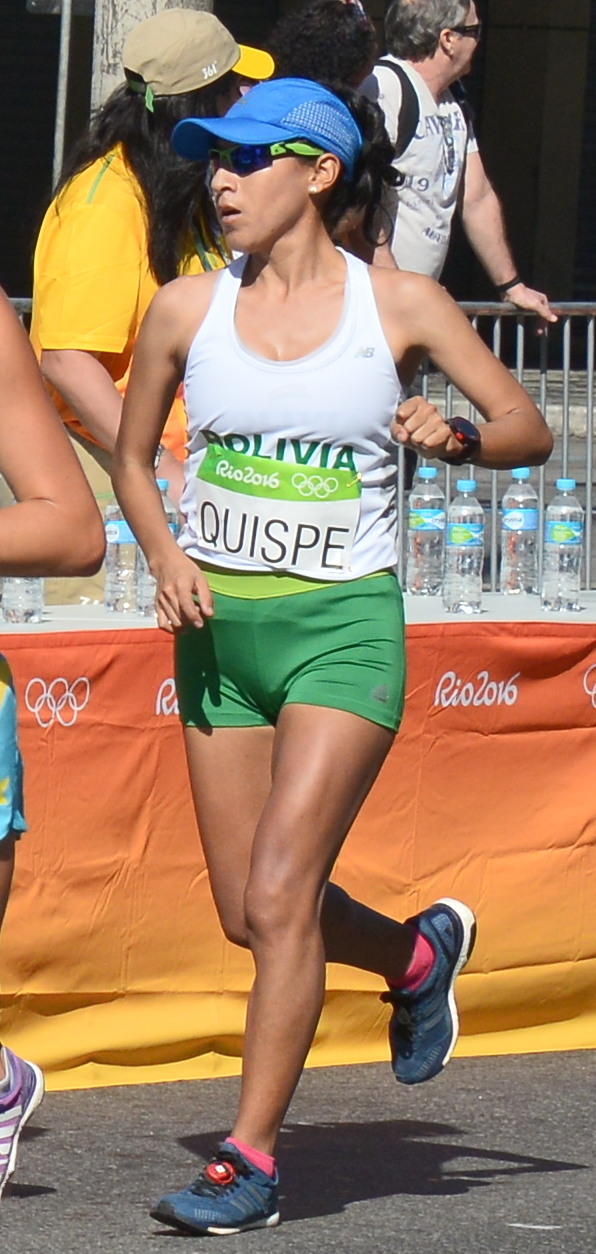
- Quispe at the 2016 Olympics

Personal information
- Born: 20 August 1983 (age 42) La Paz, Bolivia
- Education: San Simon Major University
- Height: 159 cm (5 ft 3 in)
- Weight: 50 kg (110 lb)

Sport
- Sport: Track and field
- Events: Marathon, half marathon
- Coached by: Cesar Condori

Achievements and titles
- Personal bests: HM - 1:19:07 (2010); 2:43:47 (2016)

Rosemary Quispe (born 20 August 1983) is a Bolivian long-distance runner. She qualified for the 2016 Summer Olympics at the 2016 Hamburg Marathon, which was her first official marathon race. She finished 117th at the 2016 Olympics in a time of 2:58:32.
