= Lyudmyla Kovalenko =

Ukrainian and a Belarusian athlete (born 1989)

Lyudmyla Kovalenko Liudmyla Kovalenko
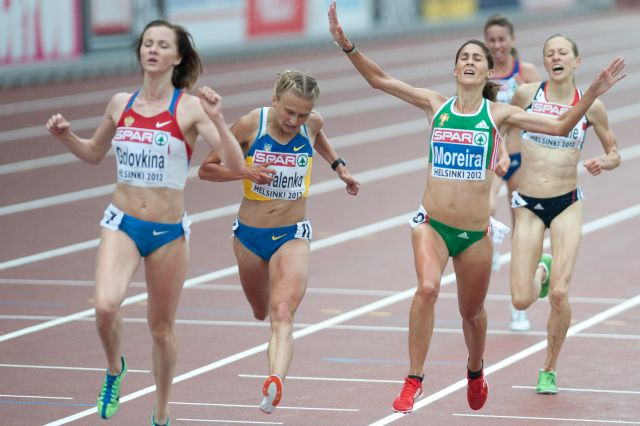
- Lyudmyla Kovalenko (second from left) at the 2012 European Championships

Personal information
- Born: 26 June 1989 (age 37) Berdychiv, Soviet Union

Sport
- Country: Ukraine; Belarus
- Sport: Track and field
- Event: Middle distance
Medal record
Representing Ukraine
European Championships
Silver medal – second place	2012 Helsinki	5000m

Lyudmyla Kovalenko or Liudmyla Kovalenko (Ukrainian: Людмила Коваленко, née Liakhovich; born 26 June 1989) is a Ukrainian and a Belarusian athlete. Kovalenko won the silver medal at the 2012 European Championships in Helsinki in the 5000 m with result 15:12.03. She is currently (April 2018) serving a doping ban.
