= Jo Pavey =

British long-distance runner

Jo Pavey MBE
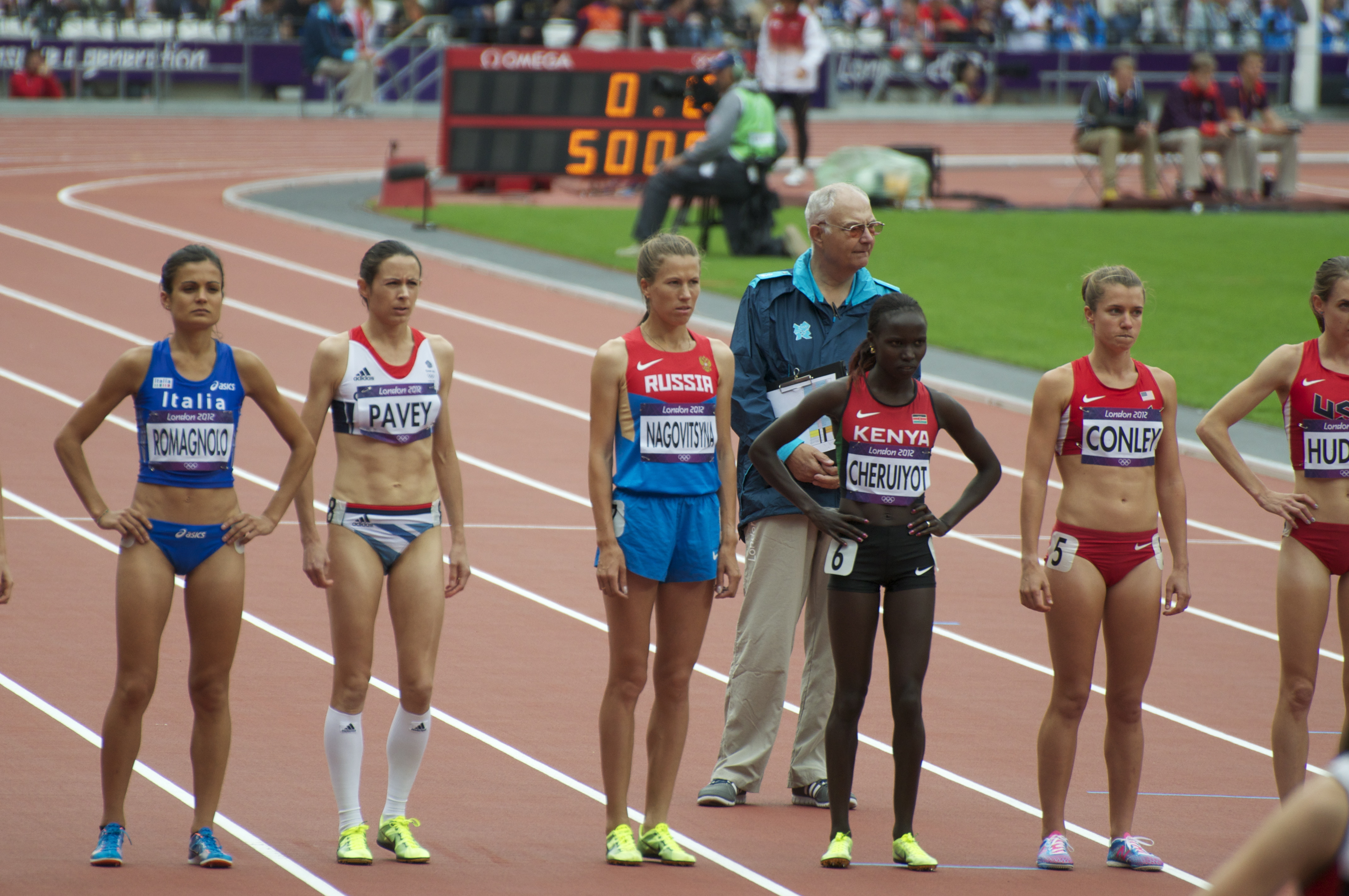
- Pavey at the start of the 5000 metres at the 2012 Summer Olympics

Personal information
- Full name: Joanne Marie Pavey
- National team: Great Britain
- Born: 20 September 1973 (age 52) Honiton, Devon, England
- Height: 1.63 m (5 ft 4 in)
- Weight: 50 kg (110 lb)

Sport
- Sport: Women's Athletics
- Club: Exeter Harriers
Medal record
Representing Great Britain
World Championships
Bronze medal – third place	2007 Osaka	10,000 m
European Championships
Gold medal – first place	2014 Zurich	10,000 m
Silver medal – second place	2012 Helsinki	10,000 m
European Cross Country Championships
Silver medal – second place	2004 Heringsdorf	Team race
Bronze medal – third place	2004 Heringsdorf	Long race
Representing England
Commonwealth Games
Silver medal – second place	2006 Melbourne	5000 m
Bronze medal – third place	2014 Glasgow	5000 m
IAAF World Cup
Bronze medal – third place	2002 Madrid	5000 m
Representing Europe
IAAF Continental Cup
Bronze medal – third place	2014 Marrakesh	5000 m

Joanne Marie Pavey MBE (née Davis, born 20 September 1973) is a British retired long-distance runner. A World, European and Commonwealth medallist, Pavey won the 10,000 m gold medal at the 2014 European Championships as the oldest female European champion to date. She also won bronze in the 10,000 m at the 2007 World Championships.

Pavey is a five-time Olympian, having represented Great Britain in every Olympic Games from 2000 to 2016. She is the only British runner and track event athlete to have competed in five games. She was the 2012 European Championship silver medallist in the 10,000 m and a two-time 5000 m medallist at the Commonwealth Games, winning silver in Melbourne 2006 and bronze in Glasgow 2014.

== Career ==
=== Early career ===
Jo Davis was born in Honiton, Devon. She has been a member of Exeter Harriers Athletics Club in Devon since 1987. In March 1988 she started to work with middle-distance coach Tony White.

In July 1988 she won the English Schools 1500 m title in a British record (under 15). Running for Devon, she finished eight places and 13 seconds ahead of Paula Radcliffe, running for Bedfordshire. Pavey then won the AAAs national U15 800 m and 1500 m titles in 1988 and the AAAs national U17 800 & 1500 m titles in 1990. She made her Great Britain & NI debut in Athens in 1989 as a fifteen-year-old competing as U20.

Pavey made her senior international debut in 1997 after finishing a degree in physiotherapy. It was during this winter that she was first coached by her husband, Gavin Pavey. Over the course of the 1997 season she improved with each race over the 1500 m and went on to win the British national title. At the 1997 World Championships in Athens, she reached the semi-finals.

Pavey first moved up to the 5000 m in 2000, after coming back from a two-year absence caused by hip and knee injuries. She injured her knee and required surgery later that year. In her first race at the distance she achieved the Olympic qualifying standard and was selected for the British team for the 2000 Summer Olympics in Sydney. Pavey finished in 12th place in the Olympic final, where she improved her personal best by 10 seconds.

Pavey entered the 2001 season with the aim of breaking the British record. She spent the winter doing warm weather training in South Africa. However, a shin injury meant she missed the first month of her season. Her first race of the year was the 3,000 m in a meeting at Lausanne, in which she finished seventh. Two weeks later she won the British 5,000 m title, and in doing so gained selection for the World Championships in Edmonton.

The women's 5,000 m at the Edmonton championships featured a controversy over the participation of Olga Yegorova, who had tested positive for erythropoietin (EPO), but had her suspension overturned. Several athletes, including the British team, discussed whether to boycott the event, but decided against it.

After another winter of warm weather training in South Africa, Pavey started the 2002 season with a 3,000 m performance which was at the time the fastest in the world that year. Pavey missed the trials for the Commonwealth Games due to a virus. She returned in the European Cup, where she finished second to Yegorova in the 5,000 m.

On the eve of the 2002 Commonwealth Games, Pavey had a bacterial infection that caused her face to swell, but recovered in time to compete. In the race she held bronze medal position with 600 m to go, but tied up severely and finished fifth. She required assistance to leave the track, and did not leave the stadium for another three hours as she received medical attention. Her condition was later attributed to a magnesium deficiency together with the infection. A Golden League meeting at the end of August brought a new 3,000 m personal best of 8:31.27. In the next Golden League meeting a week later, Pavey set a new 5,000 m personal best of 14:48.66.

For the first time in her senior career, in 2003 Pavey started the season by running cross country races. As part of the Great Britain team in the 2003 IAAF World Cross Country Championships, she finished 40th. Pavey won the 3000 m at a meet in Lille, and posted her two fastest 1500 m times. This prompted her to focus on the shorter distance at the 2003 World Championships in Paris, six years after last running 1500 m at a major championships. She finished in 10th place in the final. As an athlete ranked in the top 12 in the world in both the 3000m and 1500m, Pavey was invited to compete in the IAAF World Athletics Final in Monaco. She finished fourth in the 1500 m in a personal best 4:01.79, and the following day finished third in the 3000 m. In November Pavey achieved the first major cross country win of her career at the trials to determine the British team for the European Cross Country Championships. She withdrew from the European championships due to illness.

Pavey set a UK national record for 3000 m indoors in February 2004 in Birmingham and broke this record in January 2007 in Stuttgart with a time of 8:31.50. In 2007, Pavey also set a European indoor record for two miles.

In 2004 Pavey won a bronze medal in the European Cross Country Championships, a fifth place over 5000 m in the 2004 Summer Olympics in Athens and a national indoor record over 3000 m. In 2005 and 2006 she was Europe's fastest 5000 m runner. She won the National Championships at 5000 m on six occasions (2001, 2004, 2006, 2007, 2008, 2012) and added 10,000m wins in 2007, 2008, 2010, and 2014.

In 2003, she finished fourth in the 1500 m with a 4:01.79 clocking and third in the 3000 m with a time of 8:37.89 at the World Athletics Final in Monaco. In cup events she has won two European Cup titles and representing Europe she was third in the 2002 IAAF World Cup over 5000 m and third in the 2014 IAAF Continental Cup, where she was the women's European team captain.

=== Track and road running ===
In 2006 Pavey began competing in road races. After illness ruled her out of the Olympic 5000 m and led to a disappointing twelfth place in the 2008 Beijing Olympic Games 10000m, she announced her intentions of continuing her career until 2012 and a potential move up in distance to the marathon. Her road running career major race wins included the Great South Run (2006, 2012) and the Great Manchester Run (2007, 2008). She finished third in the 2008 Great North Run, just 2 seconds behind winner Gete Wami.

After originally coming in 4th place Pavey won bronze in the 10000 m at the 2007 World Championships in Athletics, behind Tirunesh Dibaba after silver medalist Elvan Abeylegesse was later disqualified for doping offences and finished 8th in the 5000m final. Pavey is one of only three female British athletes to have ever won a medal in the distance running events (5000m, 10000m and marathon) at global level (World Championships and Olympic Games) - along with Paula Radcliffe and Liz McColgan. She qualified to compete in the 5000 m and 10000 m at the 2008 Beijing Olympics. Due to illness she did not start in the 5000 m but finished twelfth in the 10000 m, with a time of 31:12.30.

At the beginning of the 2009 athletics season, Pavey revealed that she was pregnant and, as a result, she would miss both the 2009 London Marathon and 2009 World Championships. In September 2009, Jo and her husband Gavin, had their first child, Jacob.

She returned to competition in April 2010, finishing second to Freya Murray at the Great Ireland Run. Her marathon debut at the London Marathon in April gave her an Olympic A standard, finishing in 2:28:23. She then ran in the New York City Marathon finishing in a time of 2:28:42. Pavey sustained stress fractures in both the summer of 2010 and 2011. She was not selected for the British marathon team after missing the 2012 London Marathon, but came second at the European Cup 10000m in June.

After winning the UK Championships and Olympic Trials at 5000m, Pavey qualified for her fourth Olympic Games at the age of 38. Pavey is the only female athlete in the modern era to have competed over 1500m, 5000m and 10000m at an Olympic Games and World Championships.

At the 2012 European Championships in Helsinki, Pavey won a silver medal in the 10000m in a time of 31:49.03.

Pavey finished seventh in both the 5000m and 10000m at the London 2012 Olympic Games. Her time of 30:53.20 in the 10000m was the second fastest ever by a British athlete and the second fastest time in history by an over 35-year-old behind Kenya's Edith Masai. Masai's time has not been ratified by World Masters Athletics, who currently lists Pavey as the world record holder. Pavey was Europe's fastest 10000m runner in 2012. Pavey won the 2012 Great South Run in a time of 53:01.

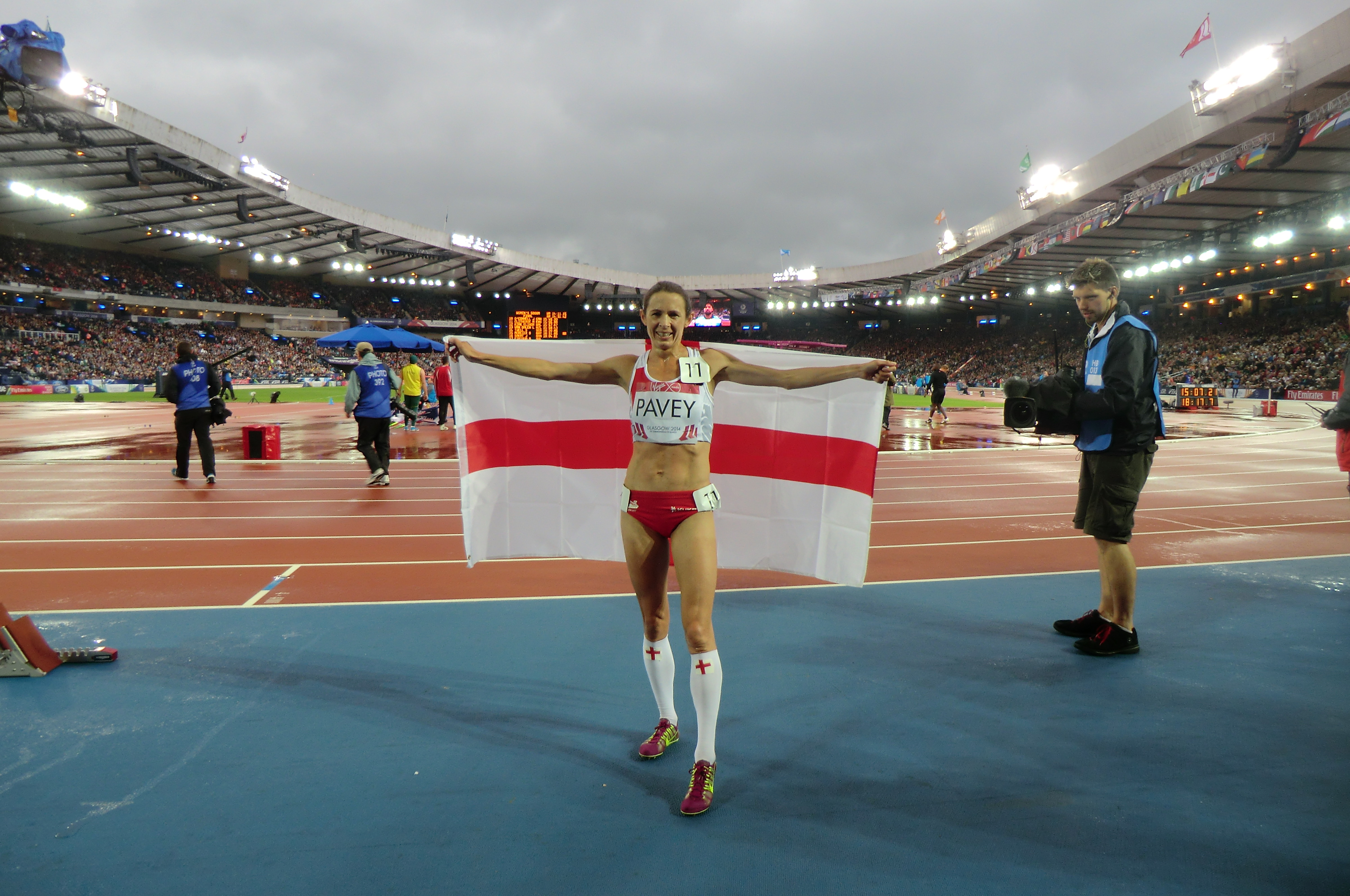
Jo Pavey at the 2014 Commonwealth Games in Glasgow

Her bronze medal time at the 2014 Commonwealth Games of 15:08.96 bettered the listed W40 World Record by almost 12 seconds, however Pavey ran an even better time of 15:04.87 at the Golden Gala two months earlier.

Ten days after the Commonwealth Games, Pavey won her first major championship, the 10,000 meters at the European Championships, one month before turning 41. She became the oldest female to win a gold medal in the history of the championships. Pavey finished her 2014 season with bronze in the Continental Cup in Marrakesh. She was named the female captain of the European Team which won the Continental Cup ahead of the Americas, Africa and Asia-Pacific.

Pavey finished in third place in the 2014 BBC Sports Personality of the Year behind Lewis Hamilton and Rory McIlroy. She was also honoured with the Freedom of the City of Exeter and an honorary doctorate from the University of Exeter.

Pavey was selected for the 2015 World Championships but opted to miss the championships and eased back on her training schedule. She ran an over 40 world record for 10 miles of 52:44 at the Great South Run in Portsmouth.

Pavey returned to competition in 2016 with the aim of competing in a fifth Olympic Games. Despite suffering from a chest infection and virus, she lined up in the British Championship and Olympic Trials 10,000 metres on 21 May. A top two finish inside the qualifying time of 32:15 would have guaranteed selection, but Pavey struggled home in sixth in 33:22. The illness persisted for around six weeks. Pavey travelled to Boston for a 10000m race in which she hoped to gain the Olympic qualifying time, but the race was cancelled after her arrival. Her last chance was to run the European Championship in Amsterdam on 6 July. Pavey finished in a time of 31:34.61, an over-40 world record. She was officially selected for the British Olympic team one week later.

At the Rio Olympic Games Pavey finished in 15th place at age 42. Pavey became the first British runner and the first British track athlete to compete in five Olympic Games.

At the London 2017 World Championships, Pavey was awarded a bronze medal from the Osaka 2007 World Championships 10000m after the original silver medalist Elvan Abeylegesse was retrospectively disqualified for doping.

== International competitions ==
Year	Competition	Venue	Position	Event	Notes
Representing England
2002	Commonwealth Games	Manchester, United Kingdom	5th	5000 m	15:19.91
2006	Commonwealth Games	Melbourne, Australia	2nd	5000 m	14:59.08
2014	Commonwealth Games	Glasgow, United Kingdom	3rd	5000 m	15:08.96
Representing Great Britain
1997	World Championships	Athens, Greece	semi-final	1500 m	4:11.22
2000	Olympic Games	Sydney, Australia	12th	5000 m	14:58.27
2001	World Championships	Edmonton, Canada	11th	5000 m	15:28.41
2002	European Championships	Munich, Germany	5th	5000 m	15:18.70
2002	World Cup	Madrid, Spain	3rd	5000 m	15:20.10
2003	World Athletics Final	Monaco	3rd	1500 m	4:01.79
2003	World Championships	Paris, France	10th	1500 m	4:03.03
2004	Olympic Games	Athens, Greece	heats	1500 m	4:12.50
2004	Olympic Games	Athens, Greece	5th	5000 m	14:57.87
2004	European Cross Country Championships	Heringsdorf, Germany	3rd	5.6 km	
2006	European Championships	Gothenburg, Sweden	4th	5000 m	15:01.41
2006	European Cup	Málaga, Spain	1st	3000m	8:52.54
2007	World Championships	Osaka, Japan	3rd	10,000 m	32:03.81
2007	World Championships	Osaka, Japan	8th	5000 m	15:04.77
2008	Olympic Games	Beijing, China	12th	10,000 m	31:12.30
2012	European Championships	Helsinki, Finland	2nd	10,000 m	31:49.03
2012	Olympic Games	London, United Kingdom	7th	5000 m	15:12.72
2012	Olympic Games	London, United Kingdom	7th	10,000 m	30:53.20
2014	European Championships	Zurich, Switzerland	7th	5,000 m	15:38.41
2014	European Championships	Zurich, Switzerland	1st	10,000 m	32:22.39
2014	Continental Cup	Marrakesh, Morocco	3rd	5000 m	15:58.67
2016	European Championships	Amsterdam, Netherlands	5th	10,000 m	31:34.61
2016	Olympic Games	Rio de Janeiro, Brazil	15th	10,000 m	31:33.44

=== Other events ===
- 2012 Great South Run – first place (10 miles)
- 2008 Great North Run – third place (half marathon)
- 2008 Great Manchester Run – first place (10k)
- 2007 Great Manchester Run – first place (10k)
- 2006 Great South Run – first place (10 miles)
- 2003 IAAF World Athletics Final – third place (3000 m)
- 2003 IAAF World Athletics Final – fourth place (1500m)

== Personal life ==
Jo Pavey (née Davis) started running at the King's School, Ottery St Mary, where teachers encouraged her to join an athletics club. A road near the school fields where she trained as a school girl has been named, 'Pavey Run', in her honour. She joined Exeter Harriers in 1987, where an early coach was Tony White. In 1997 she was coached by Mike Down (Bristol) and in 2000 by Christina Boxer, the 1982 Commonwealth Games 1500m champion. Jo was first coached by her husband and manager Gavin Pavey in the winter of 1996/97 and he resumed the coaching role in 2001. He has coached her to finals at all the major championships. Jo made the final at every major outdoors championships between 2000 and 2008 before childbirth in 2009.

Pavey studied physiotherapy at Bristol University, graduating in 1995.

She married Gavin Pavey in 1995, whom she met at Exeter Harriers in 1988. They had a son in 2009 and a daughter in 2013.

Pavey released her autobiography in July 2016, Jo Pavey: This Mum Runs.

In 2019 Pavey appeared on BBCs Pointless Celebrities charity edition, partnered with presenter Ade Adepitan, reaching but failing to win in the final rounds answers.

A personal trademark is that she always runs wearing long white compression socks.

Pavey's husband and coach, Gavin Pavey, is the coach of Innes Fitzgerald. Pavey works alongside her husband in a support and mentoring role to a successful squad of junior and senior athletes - Isca Endurance. Pavey is a commentator for TNT Sports formerly Eurosport. She writes a monthly column for Runner's World UK edition and works for various organisations in ambassador and consultation roles.
