= Christine Bardelle =

French long-distance runner

Personal information
- Nationality: France
- Born: 16 August 1974 (age 52) Provins
- Height: 1.60 m (5 ft 3 in)
- Weight: 47 kg (104 lb)

Sport
- Event: Cross Country
- Club: Ales Cevennes athlétisme
- Coached by: Gérad Pezerat

Achievements and titles
- National finals: 5000m : 15 min 20.84s

Christine Bardelle (born 16 August 1974) is a French long-distance runner.

In cross-country, Christine Bardelle's French team won the team silver medal at the 2012 European Cross Country Championships and 2013 European Cross Country Championships, and also obtained the team bronze medal at the 2008 European Cross Country Championships.

On the Track, Christine won the 5000 metres title at the championships of France 2006, 2009 et 2012, and won the national title in the 10 000 metres in 2010. Elle placed seventh in the 3000 metres at the 2013 Indoor European Championships and won this same year the gold medal in 5000 m at the 2013 Mediterranean Games.

== Achievements ==
Year	Competition	Venue	Position	Event	Notes
Representing France
2005	Jeux de la Francophonie	Niamey, Niger	3rd	5000 m	16:41.26
2008	European Cross Country Championships	Brussels, Belgium	20th	Senior race	Individual
2008	European Cross Country Championships	Brussels, Belgium	3rd	Senior race	Team
2009	Jeux de la Francophonie	Beirut, Lebanon	6th	5000 m	16:38.02
2011	European Indoor Championships	Paris, France	10th	3000 m	9:10.40
2011	European Cross Country Championships	Velenje, Slovenia	11th	Senior race	Individual
2011	European Cross Country Championships	Velenje, Slovenia	4th	Senior race	Team
2012	European Championships	Helsinki, Finland	12th	5000 m	15:33.49
2013	Mediterranean Games	Mersin, Turkey	1st	5000 m	15:39.54
