= Laila Traby =

French runner (born 1979)

Personal information
- Born: March 26, 1979 (age 47)

Sport
- Country: France
- Sport: Athletics
- Event: Running
Medal record
Representing France
Women's athletics
European Championships
| Bronze medal – third place | 2014 Zürich | 10,000 metres |

Laila Traby (born 26 March 1979) is a French runner. She won a bronze medal at the 2014 European Championships in Zürich in the 10,000 metres event. Three months after the championship, she was found by police with EPO in her apartment while training in the Pyrenees. She subsequently underwent a doping test.

Traby began her athletic career at the Institute of Sports at Rabat. She said her Sahrawi origins had not allowed her to progress in her birth country. She accused the Moroccan Federation of athletics of depriving her of a selection to the Pan Arab Games in 2004 by adding a second to her qualifying time. She emigrated to France, undocumented, in 2005 and was naturalized in 2013.

His career really began in 2013, when she won a team silver medal at the 2013 European Cross Country Championships.

Within a year, she surprised everyone by improving nearly three minutes his record over 10 km, from 34 min 36 sec to 31 min 56 s. .

In 2014, she won the title of champion of France in the 5000 m. A month later, at the European Athletic Championships, she won the bronze medal in the 10 000 m.

On 7 November, the police raided the apartment occupied by Traby where she lived in during an internship in Font-Romeu, a place of high altitude training for French distance runners. Several EPO ampoules and syringes were left in a refrigerator. According to Le Monde, the athlete would not say she was Traby, before starting to speak in Arabic only, and refusing sign any papers. This led the police to the place her in custody. A blood test confirmed the presence of EPO in her body. She said she was a "victim of a conspiracy," since EPO can not be administered by injection intravenously.

On May 18, 2015, she was suspended three years by the French Agency for doping.

== Personal Bests ==
- 800 m: 2:03,27, 7 July 2004, Rabat
- 1500 m: 4:11,31, 12 July 2009, Tanger
- 3000 m: 9:22,66, 6 May 2012, Martigues
- 5000 m: 15:48,23, 22 June 2014, Braunschweig
- 10000 m: 32:26,03, 12 August 2014, Zürich
