= Fozya Jemal =

Ethiopian long-distance runner

Amid Fozya Jemal
Personal information
- Nationality: Ethiopian
- Born: Amid Fozya Jemal; 11 September 1998 (age 27)
- Occupation: Long-distance runner
- Years active: 2019–present

Sport
- Country: Ethiopia
- Sport: Athletics
- Event(s): Marathon, Half marathon

Achievements and titles
- Personal bests: Marathon: 2:21:53 (2024); Half marathon: 1:08:14 (2024); 10,000m: 33:31.6h (2019)

Amid Fozya Jemal (born 11 September 1998) is an Ethiopian long-distance runner who specializes in the marathon. A multiple-time marathon winner, her victories include the 2024 Taipei Marathon and the 2024 New Taipei City Wan Jin Shi Marathon.

== Career ==
Amid began her career competing in track events in Ethiopia before transitioning to international road racing. She showed significant promise with a second-place finish at the 2023 Rome Marathon, where she ran 2:25:09.

Her breakthrough year came in 2024, starting with a fourth-place finish at the Dubai Marathon in January, where she set her personal best of 2:21:53.

Amid went on to win two marathons in Taiwan that same year. In March, she won the New Taipei City Wan Jin Shi Marathon. In December, she claimed the title at the prestigious Taipei Marathon, one of two World Athletics Gold Label road races in Taiwan.

== Achievements ==
All information from World Athletics profile unless otherwise noted.

Year	Competition	Venue	Position	Event	Notes
2024	Taipei Marathon	Taipei, Taiwan	1st	Marathon	2:32:47
2024	New Taipei City Wan Jin Shi Marathon	New Taipei City, Taiwan	1st	Marathon	2:38:10
2024	Dubai Marathon	Dubai, UAE	4th	Marathon	2:21:53 (PB)
2023	TCS Toronto Waterfront Marathon	Toronto, Canada	4th	Marathon	2:23:16
2023	Rome Marathon	Rome, Italy	2nd	Marathon	2:25:09
