= Layes Abdullayeva =

Ethiopian-born Azerbaijani track and field athlete

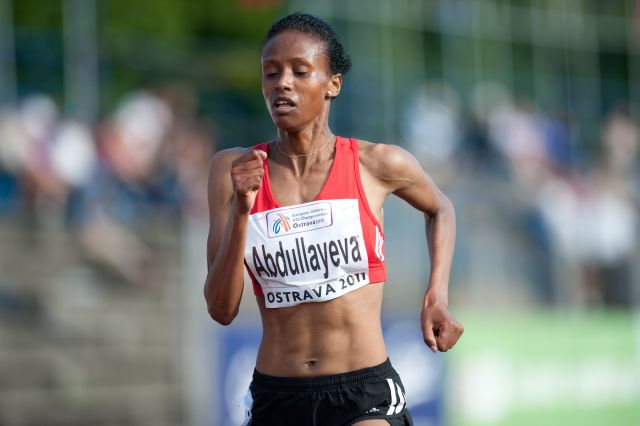
- Layes Abdullayeva in U23 2011 European Championships

Personal information
- Nationality: Azerbaijani
- Born: 29 May 1991 (age 35) Addis Ababa, Ethiopia

Sport
- Sport: Running
- Events: 1500 metres, 3000 metres, 3000 metres steeplechase, 5000 metres, Half marathon
Medal record
Women's athletics
Representing Azerbaijan
World Junior Championships in Athletics
Bronze medal – third place	2010 Moncton	3000 m
European U23 Championships in Athletics
Gold medal – first place	2011 Ostrava	10000 m
Gold medal – first place	2013 Tampere	5000 m
Islamic Solidarity Games
Bronze medal – third place	2013 Palembang	5000 m

Layes Abdullayeva (Amharic: Abelav Layes Tsige; born 29 May 1991 in Ethiopia) is an Ethiopian-born Azerbaijani international middle and long-distance track and field athlete, running in the disciplines of 1500 m, 3000 m and 5000 m, but also 10000 m.

== Life ==
In 2009, a Turkish coach in Adis Ababa persuaded her to switch allegiance to Azerbaijan. She competed for Azerbaijan in the time period from 2009 to 2013.

After the end of her sporting career, she returned back to Ethiopia and later regretted her cooperation with the Azerbaijani national team, mentioning insufficient funding and being tricked to dope.

== Achievements ==
Year	Competition	Venue	Position	Event	Notes
Representing Azerbaijan
2009	European Junior Championships	Novi Sad, Serbia	2nd	3000 m steeplechase	9:55.95
2010	World Indoor Championships	Doha, Qatar	7th	3000 m	8:57.59
2010	World Junior Championships	Moncton, Canada	3rd	3000 m	8:55.33 NR
2010	European Championships	Barcelona, Spain	6th	3000 m steeplechase	9:34.75
2011	European Indoor Championships	Paris, France	3rd	3000 m	9:00.37
2011	European U23 Championships	Ostrava, Czech Republic	1st	5000m	15:29.47
2011	European U23 Championships	Ostrava, Czech Republic	1st	10,000m	32:18.05 (CR)
2011	Universiade	Shenzhen, China	5th	5000 m	16:03.13
2012	World Indoor Championships	Istanbul, Turkey	10th (h)	3000 m	9:08.41
2012	European Championships	Helsinki, Finland	14th	5000 m	15:33.88
2012	Olympic Games	London, United Kingdom	32nd (q)	5000 m	15:45.69
2013	European Athletics U23 Championships	Tampere, Finland	1st	5000 m	15:51.72
2013	Islamic Solidarity Games	Palembang, Indonesia	3rd	5000 m	16:49.08
