= Matea Matošević =

Croatian long-distance runner

Personal information
- Born: 14 March 1989 (age 37) Zagreb, Croatia

Sport
- Sport: Track and field
- Event: Marathon

Matea Matošević (born 14 March 1989) is a Croatian long-distance runner who specialises in the marathon. She competed in the women's marathon event at the 2016 Summer Olympics.
