= San Marino at the 2026 European Athletics Championships =

- Flag of San Marino
- WA code: SMR

in Birmingham, United Kingdom 10–16 August 2026
- Competitors: 2 (1 man and 1 woman)
- Medals: Gold 0 Silver 0 Bronze 0 Total 0

European Athletics Championships appearances (overview)
- 1990; 1994–1998; 2002; 2006; 2010; 2012; 2014; 2016; 2018; 2022; 2024; 2026

San Marino competed at the 2026 European Athletics Championships in Birmingham, United Kingdom from 10–16 August 2026.

== Results ==
San Marino entered the following athletes.

Key

- Q = Qualified for the next round
- q = Qualified for the next round as a fastest loser or, in field events, by position without achieving the qualifying target
- NR = National record
- PB = Personal best
- SB = Season best
- N/A = Round not applicable for the event

Track and road events

Athlete	Event	Heat		Semifinal		Final	
Athlete	Event	Result	Rank	Result	Rank	Result	Rank
Francesco Sansovini	Men's 100 m	DNS					
Alessandra Gasparelli	Women's 100 m	11.60	21	Did not advance			
