= Germany at the 2010 European Athletics Championships =

Sporting event delegation

Germany were represented by 74 athletes at the 2010 European Athletics Championships held in Barcelona, Spain.

Just five days before the start of the Championships, it was announced that marathon runner Falk Cierpinski had to pull out due to injury.

== Participants ==
Event	Men	Women
100 m	Tobias Unger; Alexander Kosenkow; Christian Blum	Verena Sailer; Anne Möllinger; Yasmin Kwadwo
200 m	Sebastian Ernst; Daniel Schnelting	
800 m		Claudia Hoffmann
1500 m	Carsten Schlangen; Moritz Waldmann	
5000 m	Arne Gabius	Sabrina Mockenhaupt
10,000 m	Jan Fitschen; Christian Glatting; Filmon Ghirmai	Sabrina Mockenhaupt
Marathon	Martin Beckmann; Tobias Sauter	
100 m hurdles		Carolin Nytra; Cyndi Roleder; Nadine Hildebrand
110 m hurdles	Alexander John; Matthias Bühler	
400 m hurdles		Fabienne Kohlmann
3000 st.	Steffen Uliczka	
20 km walk	André Höhne; Maik Berger	Melanie Seeger
50 km walk	Christopher Linke; André Höhne	
High Jump		Ariane Friedrich
Pole Vault	Malte Mohr; Raphael Holzdeppe; Fabian Schulze	Silke Spiegelburg; Carolin Hingst; Lisa Ryzih
Long Jump	Christian Reif	Bianca Kappler; Nadja Käther
Triple Jump		Katja Demut
Shot Put	Ralf Bartels; David Storl	Nadine Kleinert; Petra Lammert; Denise Hinrichs
Discus Throw	Robert Harting; Markus Münch; Martin Wierig	Nadine Müller; Sabine Rumpf
Hammer Throw	Markus Esser	Betty Heidler; Kathrin Klaas
Javelin Throw	Matthias de Zordo	Christina Obergföll; Katharina Molitor; Linda Stahl
Heptathlon		Jennifer Oeser; Maren Schwerdtner; Claudia Rath
4 × 100 m relay	Tobias Unger; Alexander Kosenkow; Christian Blum; Martin Keller; Sebastian Ernst; Marius Broening	Verena Sailer; Anne Möllinger; Yasmin Kwadwo; Marion Wagner; Katja Tengel; Carolin Nytra
4 × 400 m relay	Kamghe Gaba; Thomas Schneider; Eric Krüger; Jonas Plass; Bastian Swillims	Esther Cremer; Claudia Hoffmann; Janin Lindenberg; Wiebke Ullmann; Fabienne Kohlmann; Jill Richards

== Results ==
=== Men ===
Track and road events

Event	Athletes	Heat Round 1		Semifinal		Final	
Event	Athletes	Result	Rank	Result	Rank	Result	Rank
100 m	Christian Blum	10.57 Q	23	10.69	24	Did not advance	
100 m	Alexander Kosenkow	10.44 Q	15	10.38	12	Did not advance	
100 m	Tobias Unger	10.35 Q	8	10.52	20	Did not advance	
200 m	Sebastian Ernst	20.72 Q	7	20.95	16	did not advance	
200 m	Daniel Schnelting	20.98	18	did not advance			
1500 m	Carsten Schlangen	3:41.65 Q	5			3:43.52	2nd place, silver medalist(s)
1500 m	Moritz Waldmann	3:48.60	25			Did not advance	
5000 m	Arne Gabius	13:39.78 q	13			13:59.11	12
10,000 m	Jan Fitschen					29:16.59	12
10,000 m	Filmon Ghirmai					29:28.31	15
10,000 m	Christian Glatting					29:09.84	9
110 m hurdles	Matthias Bühler	13.62 q	9	13.99	12	did not advance	
110 m hurdles	Alexander John	13.61 q	8	13.56 Q	6	13.71	8
3000 m steeplechase	Steffen Uliczka	8:30.61 Q	8			8:25.39 PB	7
4 × 100 m relay	Christian Blum; Marius Broening; Sebastian Ernst; Martin Keller; Alexander Kosenkow; Tobias Unger	38.75 Q	1			38.44	3rd place, bronze medalist(s)
4 × 400 m relay	Kamghe Gaba; Eric Krüger; Jonas Plass; Thomas Schneider; Bastian Swillims	3:03.83 Q	2			3:02.65	4
Marathon	Martin Beckmann					DNF	
Marathon	Tobias Sauter					DNF	
20 km walk	Maik Berger					1:25:01	16
50 km walk	André Höhne					3:49.29	7
50 km walk	Christopher Linke					DNF	

Field events

Event	Athletes	Qualification		Final	
Event	Athletes	Result	Rank	Result	Rank
Long jump	Christian Reif	8.27 EL Q	2	8.47 WL CR PB	1st place, gold medalist(s)
Pole vault	Raphael Holzdeppe	5.65 Q	6	5.60	9
Pole vault	Malte Mohr	5.50	17	did not advance	
Pole vault	Fabian Schulze	5.65 Q	8	5.70 SB	6
Shot put	Ralf Bartels	20.37 Q	2	20.93	2nd place, silver medalist(s)
Shot put	David Storl	20.24 Q	5	20.57	5
Discus throw	Robert Harting	66.93 Q	1	68.47 SB	2nd place, silver medalist(s)
Discus throw	Markus Münch	58.81	24	did not advance	
Discus throw	Martin Wierig	62.57 q	9	63.32	7
Hammer throw	Markus Esser	71.89	19	Did not advance	
Javelin throw	Matthias de Zordo	82.34 Q	3	87.81 PB	2nd place, silver medalist(s)

=== Women ===
Track and road events

Event	Athletes	Heats		Semifinal		Final	
Event	Athletes	Result	Rank	Result	Rank	Result	Rank
100 m	Yasmin Kwadwo	11.68	22	Did not advance			
100 m	Anne Möllinger	11.51 q	11	11.60	16	did not advance	
100 m	Verena Sailer	11.27 Q	1	11.06 Q	1	11.10 PB	1st place, gold medalist(s)
800 m	Claudia Hoffmann	2:01.19	14	Did not advance			
5000 m	Sabrina Mockenhaupt					DNS	
10,000 m	Sabrina Mockenhaupt					32:06.02	6
100 m hurdles	Nadine Hildebrand	13.25 Q	15	12.96 PB q	8	13.08	8
100 m hurdles	Carolin Nytra	12.89 Q	4	12.75 Q	2	12.86	3rd place, bronze medalist(s)
100 m hurdles	Cyndi Roleder	13.19 q	12	DSQ		did not advance	
400 m hurdles	Fabienne Kohlmann	55.69 PB Q	8	55.49 PB	9	Did not advance	
4 × 100 m relay	Yasmin Kwadwo; Anne Möllinger; Carolin Nytra; Verena Sailer; Katja Tengel; Marion Wagner	DSQ				did not advance	
4 × 400 m relay	Esther Cremer; Claudia Hoffmann; Fabienne Kohlmann; Janin Lindenberg; Jill Richards; Wiebke Ullmann	3:28.67 Q	4			3.24.07	2nd place, silver medalist(s)
20 km walk	Melanie Seeger					1:29:43	4

Field events

Event	Athletes	Qualification		Final	
Event	Athletes	Result	Rank	Result	Rank
Long jump	Bianca Kappler	6.50	17	Did not advance	
Long jump	Nadja Käther	6.61	14	Did not advance	
Triple jump	Katja Demut	NM		did not advance	
High jump	Ariane Friedrich	1.92 Q	1	2.01	3rd place, bronze medalist(s)
Pole vault	Carolin Hingst	4.40 Q	4	4.35	11
Pole vault	Elizaveta Ryzih	4.35 q	10	4.65 PB	3rd place, bronze medalist(s)
Pole vault	Silke Spiegelburg	4.40 Q	1	4.65	2nd place, silver medalist(s)
Shot put	Denise Hinrichs	17.72 Q	10	18.48	8
Shot put	Nadine Kleinert	18.98 Q	1	18.94	7
Shot put	Petra Lammert	18.48 Q	2	18.94	6
Discus throw	Nadine Müller	60.54 Q	2	57.78	8
Discus throw	Sabine Rumpf	58.41 q	8	58.89	7
Hammer throw	Betty Heidler	71.85 Q	2	76.38 SB	1st place, gold medalist(s)
Hammer throw	Kathrin Klaas	65.82	15	did not advance	
Javelin throw	Katharina Molitor	59.74 Q	5	63.81	4
Javelin throw	Christina Obergföll	65.05 Q	2	65.58	2nd place, silver medalist(s)
Javelin throw	Linda Stahl	57.42 q	8	66.81 PB	1st place, gold medalist(s)
Heptathlon	Jennifer Oeser			6683	3rd place, bronze medalist(s)
Heptathlon	Claudia Rath			6107	11
Heptathlon	Maren Schwerdtner			6167	9

== Medal count ==
2010 Barcelona	Gold	Silver	Bronze	Total
Germany (GER)	4	7	5	16
