= San Marino at the 2022 European Athletics Championships =

- Flag of San Marino
- WA code: SMR
- National federation: San Marino Athletics Federation

in Munich, Germany 15 August 2022 – 21 August 2022
- Competitors: 2 (2 men) in 2 events
- Medals: Gold 0 Silver 0 Bronze 0 Total 0

European Athletics Championships appearances (overview)
- 1990; 1994–1998; 2002; 2006; 2010; 2012; 2014; 2016; 2018; 2022; 2024

San Marino competed at the 2022 European Athletics Championships in Munich, Germany, between 15 and 21 August 2022

== Results ==
San Marino entered the following athletes.

Key

- Q = Qualified for the next round
- q = Qualified for the next round as a fastest loser or, in field events, by position without achieving the qualifying target
- NR = National record
- PB = Personal best
- SB = Season best
- N/A = Round not applicable for the event

=== Men ===
Track and road events

Athlete	Event	Heat		Semifinal		Final	
Athlete	Event	Result	Rank	Result	Rank	Result	Rank
Francesco Sansovini	100 m	10.82	17	Did not advance			
Andrea Ercolani Volta	400 m hurdles	52.59 SB	25	Did not advance			
