= 2010 European Athletics Championships – Women's heptathlon =

Women's heptathlon at the European Athletics Championships

The women's heptathlon at the 2010 European Athletics Championships was held at the Estadi Olímpic Lluís Companys on 30 and 31 July.

== Medalists ==
Gold	(United Kingdom) Jessica Ennis; Great Britain (GBR)
Silver	Nataliya Dobrynska; Ukraine (UKR)
Bronze	Jennifer Oeser; Germany (GER)

== Records ==
Standing records prior to the 2010 European Athletics Championships
World record	Jackie Joyner-Kersee (USA)	7291	Seoul, South Korea	24 September 1988
European record	Carolina Klüft (SWE)	7032	Osaka, Japan	26 August 2007
Championship record	Carolina Klüft (SWE)	6740	Gothenburg, Sweden	8 August 2006
World Leading	Hyleas Fountain (USA)	6735	Des Moines, United States	26 June 2010
European Leading	Jessica Ennis (GBR)	6689	Götzis, Austria	30 May 2010
Broken records during the 2010 European Athletics Championships
Championship record	Jessica Ennis (GBR)	6823	Barcelona, Spain	31 July 2010
World Leading	Jessica Ennis (GBR)	6823	Barcelona, Spain	31 July 2010
European Leading	Jessica Ennis (GBR)	6823	Barcelona, Spain	31 July 2010

== Schedule ==
Date	Time	Round
30 July 2010	11:00	100 metres hurdles
30 July 2010	12:05	High jump
30 July 2010	18:45	Shot put
30 July 2010	20:55	200 metres
31 July 2010	11:15	Long jump
31 July 2010	16:15	Javelin throw
31 July 2010	20:45	800 metres
31 July 2010		Final standings

== Results ==
=== 100 metres hurdles ===
==== Heat 1 ====
Rank	Lane	Name	Nationality	React	Time	Notes	Points
1	4	Nataliya Dobrynska	Ukraine		13.59	SB	1037
2	7	Jessica Samuelsson	Sweden		14.28		939
3	2	Yana Maksimava	Belarus		14.40	SB	923
4	5	Eliška Klučinová	Czech Republic		14.42		920
5	6	Nadja Casadei	Sweden		14.43		918
6	1	Ida Marcussen	Norway		14.56	SB	901
7	3	Helga Margrét Thorsteinsdóttir	Iceland		14.95		848
—N/a	8	Jolanda Keizer	Netherlands		DSQ		–
				Wind: −1.6 m/s			

==== Heat 2 ====
Rank	Lane	Name	Nationality	React	Time	Notes	Points
1	3	Karolina Tymińska	Poland		13.54	PB	1044
2	4	Sofía Ifadídou	Greece		13.60	SB	1036
3	5	Bárbara Hernando	Spain		13.69	PB	1023
4	2	Grit Šadeiko	Estonia		13.84	SB	1001
5	6	Lyudmyla Yosypenko	Ukraine		13.94		987
6	8	Claudia Rath	Germany		13.96	PB	984
7	1	Aryiró Stratáki	Greece		14.03		974
8	9	Marina Goncharova	Russia		14.04		973
9	7	Yana Panteleyeva	Russia		14.29		938
				Wind: +0.2 m/s			

==== Heat 3 ====
Rank	Lane	Name	Nationality	React	Time	Notes	Points
1	4	Jessica Ennis	Great Britain & N.I.		12.95		1132
2	6	Jennifer Oeser	Germany		13.37	PB	1069
3	3	Sara Aerts	Belgium		13.38		1068
4	1	Antoinette Nana Djimou Ida	France		13.40	SB	1065
5	9	Maren Schwerdtner	Germany		13.63		1031
DQ	5	Tatyana Chernova	Russia		~~13.73~~		~~1017~~
7	8	Hanna Melnychenko	Ukraine		13.84		1001
8	7	Linda Züblin	Switzerland		13.92		990
9	2	Kateřina Cachová	Czech Republic		13.96		984
				Wind: −1.0 m/s			

=== High jump ===
Rank	Athlete	Nationality	Result	Points	Notes
1	Jessica Ennis	Great Britain & N.I.	1.89	1093	
2	Lyudmyla Yosypenko	Ukraine	1.86	1054	SB
3	Hanna Melnychenko	Ukraine	1.86	1054	=PB
4	Nataliya Dobrynska	Ukraine	1.86	1054	=PB
5	Yana Maksimava	Belarus	1.83	1016	
6	Jennifer Oeser	Germany	1.83	1016	SB
DQ	Tatyana Chernova	Russia	~~1.83~~	~~1016~~	~~SB~~
8	Marina Goncharova	Russia	1.83	1016	PB
9	Eliška Klučinová	Czech Republic	1.80	978	
9	Yana Panteleyeva	Russia	1.80	978	PB
11	Claudia Rath	Germany	1.80	978	SB
12	Kateřina Cachová	Czech Republic	1.77	941	
13	Sara Aerts	Belgium	1.74	903	SB
13	Ida Marcussen	Norway	1.74	903	
15	Jessica Samuelsson	Sweden	1.74	903	SB
15	Maren Schwerdtner	Germany	1.74	903	SB
15	Karolina Tymińska	Poland	1.74	903	SB
18	Jolanda Keizer	Netherlands	1.74	903	=SB
19	Sofia Iadídou	Greece	1.71	867	PB
19	Grit Šadeiko	Estonia	1.71	867	=PB
21	Antoinette Nana Djimou Ida	France	1.71	867	
21	Aryiró Stratáki	Greece	1.71	867	
23	Bárbara Hernando	Spain	1.68	830	PB
24	Helga Margrét Thorsteinsdóttir	Iceland	1.65	795	
25	Linda Züblin	Switzerland	1.62	759	SB
—N/a	Nadja Casadei	Sweden			DNS

=== Shot put ===
Rank	Athlete	Nationality	#1	#2	#3	Result	Points	Notes
1	Nataliya Dobrynska	Ukraine	15.88	15.01	15.48	15.88	920	SB
2	Jolanda Keizer	Netherlands	13.71	14.93	14.97	14.97	859	
3	Jessica Samuelsson	Sweden	13.88	14.29	14.20	14.29	813	
4	Karolina Tymińska	Poland	13.57	14.08	X	14.08	799	
5	Eliška Klučinová	Czech Republic	14.05	13.10	14.01	14.05	797	
6	Jessica Ennis	Great Britain & N.I.	13.49	13.11	14.05	14.05	797	
7	Yana Panteleyeva	Russia	13.78	13.85	13.59	13.85	784	
DQ	Tatyana Chernova	Russia	~~13.47~~	~~13.82~~	~~13.35~~	~~13.82~~	~~782~~	~~PB~~
9	Jennifer Oeser	Germany	13.31	12.71	13.82	13.82	782	SB
10	Antoinette Nana Djimou Ida	France	12.99	13.67	13.39	13.67	772	
11	Maren Schwerdtner	Germany	13.56	X	X	13.56	765	
12	Hanna Melnychenko	Ukraine	12.89	13.28	12.98	13.28	746	SB
13	Aryiró Stratáki	Greece	13.20	13.18	X	13.20	741	
14	Sara Aerts	Belgium	12.79	12.83	13.13	13.13	736	
15	Marina Goncharova	Russia	13.09	13.12	13.00	13.12	735	
16	Yana Maksimava	Belarus	13.10	12.99	X	13.10	734	
17	Linda Züblin	Switzerland	12.63	13.05	12.35	13.05	731	
18	Lyudmyla Yosypenko	Ukraine	X	12.08	12.98	12.98	726	
19	Ida Marcussen	Norway	X	12.45	12.77	12.77	712	
20	Helga Margrét Thorsteinsdóttir	Iceland	12.44	12.74	X	12.74	710	
21	Sofia Iadídou	Greece	12.25	12.08	12.59	12.59	700	
22	Claudia Rath	Germany	12.41	12.12	12.18	12.41	688	PB
23	Bárbara Hernando	Spain	12.05	11.50	X	12.05	664	PB
24	Kateřina Cachová	Czech Republic	10.61	11.25	11.07	11.25	612	SB
25	Grit Šadeiko	Estonia	10.38	10.78	10.35	10.78	581	
—N/a	Nadja Casadei	Sweden	–	–	–	DNS	–	

=== 200 metres ===
==== Heat 1 ====
Rank	Lane	Name	Nationality	Time	Points	Notes
1	7	Jessica Samuelsson	Sweden	24.53	930	
2	1	Grit Šadeiko	Estonia	24.99	888	
3	3	Yana Panteleyeva	Russia	25.34	856	PB
4	2	Bárbara Hernando	Spain	25.98	799	
5	4	Yana Maksimava	Belarus	26.03	795	
—N/a	5	Helga Margrét Thorsteinsdóttir	Iceland	–	–	DNS
—N/a	6	Nadja Casadei	Sweden	–	–	DNS
—N/a	8	Jolanda Keizer	Netherlands	–	–	DNS

==== Heat 2 ====
Rank	Lane	Name	Nationality	Time	Points	Notes
1	7	Nataliya Dobrynska	Ukraine	24.23	959	PB
2	6	Maren Schwerdtner	Germany	24.37	945	SB
3	5	Kateřina Cachová	Czech Republic	24.76	909	PB
4	3	Antoinette Nana Djimou Ida	France	24.97	890	
5	4	Eliška Klučinová	Czech Republic	25.09	879	
6	8	Ida Marcussen	Norway	25.20	869	SB
7	2	Aryiró Stratáki	Greece	24.43	848	
8	1	Sofía Ifadídou	Greece	25.58	834	
9	9	Marina Goncharova	Russia	25.61	832	

==== Heat 3 ====
Rank	Lane	Name	Nationality	Time	Points	Notes
1	3	Jessica Ennis	Great Britain & N.I.	23.21	1058	SB
2	6	Karolina Tymińska	Poland	23.77	1003	SB
3	8	Jennifer Oeser	Germany	24.07	974	PB
DQ	9	Tatyana Chernova	Russia	~~24.15~~	~~966~~	~~SB~~
5	4	Claudia Rath	Germany	24.55	929	
6	5	Sara Aerts	Belgium	24.62	922	
7	1	Lyudmyla Yosypenko	Ukraine	24.63	921	SB
8	2	Hanna Melnychenko	Ukraine	24.83	902	
9	7	Linda Züblin	Switzerland	25.06	881	

=== Long jump ===
Rank	Athlete	Nationality	Result	Points	Notes
1	Jennifer Oeser	Germany	6.68	1066	PB
2	Nataliya Dobrynska	Ukraine	6.56	1027	SB
3	Claudia Rath	Germany	6.44	988	
4	Jessica Ennis	Great Britain & N.I.	6.43	985	
DQ	Tatyana Chernova	Russia	~~6.42~~	~~981~~	
6	Maren Schwerdtner	Germany	6.34	956	PB
7	Ida Marcussen	Norway	6.30	943	=SB
8	Eliška Klučinová	Czech Republic	6.30	943	PB
9	Jessica Samuelsson	Sweden	6.26	930	
10	Yana Panteleyeva	Russia	6.23	921	
11	Sara Aerts	Belgium	6.17	902	SB
12	Lyudmyla Yosypenko	Ukraine	6.14	893	
13	Kateřina Cachová	Czech Republic	6.12	887	SB
14	Karolina Tymińska	Poland	6.11	883	
15	Grit Šadeiko	Estonia	6.10	880	
16	Marina Goncharova	Russia	6.06	868	
17	Linda Züblin	Switzerland	5.99	846	SB
18	Sofia Iadídou	Greece	5.89	816	
19	Aryiró Stratáki	Greece	5.82	795	
20	Bárbara Hernando	Spain	5.67	750	
21	Yana Maksimava	Belarus	5.61	732	
22	Antoinette Nana Djimou Ida	France	5.45	686	
—N/a	Hanna Melnychenko	Ukraine	NM	–	
—N/a	Jolanda Keizer	Netherlands			DNS
—N/a	Helga Margrét Thorsteinsdóttir	Iceland			DNS

=== Javelin throw ===
Rank	Athlete	Nationality	#1	#2	#3	Result	Points	Notes
1	Sofia Ifadídou	Greece	52.52	51.36	x	51.36	909	SB
DQ	Tatyana Chernova	Russia	~~41.88~~	~~50.22~~	~~48.18~~	~~50.22~~	~~864~~	
3	Marina Goncharova	Russia	42.85	49.47	x	49.47	850	
4	Linda Züblin	Switzerland	47.14	49.36	47.17	49.36	848	
5	Nataliya Dobrynska	Ukraine	45.75	49.25	47.04	49.25	846	PB
6	Jennifer Oeser	Germany	49.17	47.45	45.60	49.17	844	PB
7	Lyudmyla Yosypenko	Ukraine	37.27	46.92	38.57	46.92	801	
8	Jessica Ennis	Great Britain & N.I.	46.71	45.28	45.71	46.71	796	PB
9	Ida Marcussen	Norway	38.01	45.09	45.44	45.44	772	
10	Grit Šadeiko	Estonia	40.16	45.27	x	45.27	769	
10	Maren Schwerdtner	Germany	39.21	45.27	41.61	45.27	769	SB
12	Eliška Klučinová	Czech Republic	43.90	44.07	38.71	44.07	746	
13	Kateřina Cachová	Czech Republic	34.63	42.22	39.03	42.22	710	SB
14	Aryiró Stratáki	Greece	41.88	40.84	39.96	41.88	703	
15	Yana Panteleyeva	Russia	41.67	x	x	41.67	699	
16	Yana Maksimava	Belarus	39.19	40.65	41.29	41.29	692	
17	Sara Aerts	Belgium	40.30	36.35	38.45	40.30	673	=PB
18	Claudia Rath	Germany	38.88	39.13	x	39.13	651	
19	Jessica Samuelsson	Sweden	35.43	38.61	x	38.61	641	PB
20	Hanna Melnychenko	Ukraine	x	x	37.87	37.87	626	
21	Bárbara Hernando	Spain	35.25	33.50	35.84	35.84	588	
22	Karolina Tymińska	Poland	31.98	35.43	34.02	35.43	580	SB

=== 800 metres ===
==== Heat 1 ====
Rank	Lane	Name	Nationality	Time	Points	Notes
1	2	Karolina Tymińska	Poland	2:06.43	1018	SB
2	4	Jessica Samuelsson	Sweden	2:08.25	990	
3	7	Yana Maksimava	Belarus	2:11.29	946	PB
4	8	Ida Marcussen	Norway	2:12.46	929	SB
5	5	Yana Panteleyeva	Russia	2:15.69	883	
6	6	Sara Aerts	Belgium	2:15.90	880	PB
7	9	Kateřina Cachová	Czech Republic	2:16.79	868	SB
8	1	Linda Züblin	Switzerland	2:17.54	857	
9	3	Sofia Ifadídou	Greece	2:18.64	842	
10	1	Grit Šadeiko	Estonia	2:23.64	775	

==== Heat 2 ====
Rank	Lane	Name	Nationality	Time	Points	Notes
1	4	Jessica Ennis	Great Britain & N.I.	2:10.18	962	SB
2	7	Nataliya Dobrynska	Ukraine	2:12.06	935	PB
3	5	Jennifer Oeser	Germany	2:12.28	932	SB
4	1	Eliška Klučinová	Czech Republic	2:12.82	924	PB
5	2	Marina Goncharova	Russia	2:13.66	912	
6	9	Claudia Rath	Germany	2:15.24	889	
DQ	3	Tatyana Chernova	Russia	~~2:15.45~~	~~886~~	
8	6	Lyudmyla Yosypenko	Ukraine	2:19.97	824	
9	8	Maren Schwerdtner	Germany	2:21.86	798	

=== Final standings ===
Place	Athlete	Nation	Points	Notes
1st place, gold medalist(s)	Jessica Ennis	Great Britain & N.I.	6823	CR, WL, PB
2nd place, silver medalist(s)	Nataliya Dobrynska	Ukraine	6778	PB
3rd place, bronze medalist(s)	Jennifer Oeser	Germany	6683	PB
DQ	Tatyana Chernova	Russia	~~6512~~	
4	Karolina Tymińska	Poland	6230	SB
5	Lyudmyla Yosypenko	Ukraine	6206	
6	Eliška Klučinová	Czech Republic	6187	
7	Marina Goncharova	Russia	6186	SB
8	Maren Schwerdtner	Germany	6167	PB
9	Jessica Samuelsson	Sweden	6146	PB
10	Claudia Rath	Germany	6107	PB
11	Sara Aerts	Belgium	6084	PB
12	Yana Panteleyeva	Russia	6059	
13	Ida Marcussen	Norway	6029	SB
14	Sofía Ifadídou	Greece	6004	PB
15	Linda Züblin	Switzerland	5912	
16	Kateřina Cachová	Czech Republic	5911	PB
17	Yana Maksimava	Belarus	5838	
18	Grit Šadeiko	Estonia	5761	
—N/a	Aryiró Stratáki	Greece	DNF	
—N/a	Bárbara Hernando	Spain	DNF	
—N/a	Hanna Melnychenko	Ukraine	DNF	
—N/a	Helga Margrét Thorsteinsdóttir	Iceland	DNF	
—N/a	Nadja Casadei	Sweden	DNF	
—N/a	Antoinette Nana Djimou Ida	France	DNF	
—N/a	Jolanda Keizer	Netherlands	DNF	
