= San Marino at the 2016 European Athletics Championships =

- WA code: SMR
- National federation: FSAL

in Amsterdam
- Competitors: 1

European Athletics Championships appearances (overview)
- 1990; 1994–1998; 2002; 2006; 2010; 2012; 2014; 2016; 2018; 2022; 2024

San Marino competed at the 2016 European Athletics Championships in Amsterdam, Netherlands, between 6 and 10 July 2016.

== Results ==
=== Men ===
Field events

Athlete	Event	Qualification		Final	
Athlete	Event	Distance	Position	Distance	Position
Eugenio Rossi	High jump	2.23	=13	did not advance	
