= 2010 European Athletics Championships – Women's 400 metres hurdles =

Women's 400 metres hurdles at the European Athletics Championships
- Venue: Estadi Olímpic Lluís Companys
- Location: Barcelona, Spain
- Dates: 27, 28 and 30 July 2010
- Winning time: 52.92 s CR

Medalists
gold medal	Natalya Antyukh	Russia
silver medal	Vania Stambolova	Bulgaria
bronze medal	Perri Shakes-Drayton	Great Britain

The women's 400 metres hurdles at the 2010 European Athletics Championships was held at the Estadi Olímpic Lluís Companys on 27, 28 and 30 July.

== Medalists ==
Gold	Natalya Antyukh; Russia (RUS)
Silver	Vania Stambolova; Bulgaria (BUL)
Bronze	(United Kingdom) Perri Shakes-Drayton; Great Britain (GBR)

== Records ==
Standing records prior to the 2010 European Athletics Championships
World record	Yuliya Pechonkina (RUS)	52.34	Tula, Russia	8 August 2003
European record	Yuliya Pechonkina (RUS)	52.34	Tula, Russia	8 August 2003
Championship record	Marina Stepanova (URS)	53.32	Stuttgart, West Germany	30 August 1986
World Leading	Lashinda Demus (USA)	52.82	Rome, Italy	10 June 2010
European Leading	Natalya Antyukh (RUS)	54.00	Rome, Italy	10 June 2010
Broken records during the 2010 European Athletics Championships
Championship record	Natalya Antyukh (RUS)	52.92	Barcelona, Spain	30 July 2010
European Leading	Natalya Antyukh (RUS)	52.92	Barcelona, Spain	30 July 2010

== Schedule ==
Date	Time	Round
27 July 2010	10:00	Round 1
28 July 2010	20:15	Semifinals
30 July 2010	21:40	Final

== Results ==
=== Round 1 ===
First 3 in each heat and 4 best performers advance to the Semifinals.

==== Heat 1 ====
Rank	Lane	Name	Nationality	React	Time	Notes
1	6	Angela Moroșanu	Romania	0.221	55.11	Q
2	4	Perri Shakes-Drayton	Great Britain & N.I.	0.331	55.35	Q
3	7	Hanna Titimets	Ukraine	0.295	55.58	Q
4	2	Manuela Gentili	Italy	0.190	56.14	q
5	3	Nikolina Horvat	Croatia	0.255	56.64	
6	8	Stine Tomb	Norway	0.217	57.10	
7	5	Sofie Persson	Sweden		57.23	
8	1	Justine Kinney	Ireland	0.196	57.39	

==== Heat 2 ====
Rank	Lane	Name	Nationality	React	Time	Notes
1	3	Zuzana Hejnová	Czech Republic	0.186	55.36	Q
2	7	Yevgeniya Isakova	Russia	0.255	55.64	Q
3	6	Élodie Ouédraogo	Belgium	0.231	55.80	Q
4	8	Hanna Yaroshchuk	Ukraine	0.322	55.88	q
5	1	Michelle Carey	Ireland	0.295	57.58	
6	4	Birsen Engin	Turkey	0.200	58.19	
7	2	Kristín Birna Ólafsdóttir-Johnson	Iceland	0.182	58.34	
8	5	Laia Forcadell	Spain		58.80	

==== Heat 3 ====
Rank	Lane	Name	Nationality	React	Time	Notes
1	2	Vania Stambolova	Bulgaria	0.232	54.77	Q
2	8	Eilidh Child	Great Britain & N.I.	0.189	55.82	Q
3	6	Natalia Ivanova	Russia	0.243	55.83	Q
4	1	Zuzana Bergrová	Czech Republic	0.242	56.55	q
5	4	Patrícia Lopes	Portugal	0.326	56.78	
6	3	Ilona Ranta	Finland	0.209	56.94	
7	5	Brona Furlong	Ireland	0.320	58.13	
8	7	Özge Gürler	Turkey	0.210	58.98	

==== Heat 4 ====
Rank	Lane	Name	Nationality	React	Time	Notes
1	3	Natalya Antyukh	Russia	0.249	54.29	Q
2	4	Fabienne Kohlmann	Germany	0.187	55.69	Q
3	1	Ieva Zunda	Latvia	0.262	56.02	Q
4	7	Marzena Kościelniak	Poland	0.449	56.52	q
5	6	Sara Petersen	Denmark	0.242	57.28	
6	2	Anastasiya Rabchenyuk	Ukraine	0.239	57.72	
7	8	Kristina Volfová	Czech Republic	0.294	58.42	
8	5	Amaliya Sharoyan	Armenia		1:03.37	

==== Summary ====
Rank	Heat	Lane	Name	Nationality	React	Time	Notes
1	4	3	Natalya Antyukh	Russia	0.249	54.29	Q
2	3	2	Vania Stambolova	Bulgaria	0.232	54.77	Q
3	1	6	Angela Moroșanu	Romania	0.221	55.11	Q
4	1	4	Perri Shakes-Drayton	Great Britain & N.I.	0.331	55.35	Q
5	2	3	Zuzana Hejnová	Czech Republic	0.186	55.36	Q
6	1	7	Hanna Titimets	Ukraine	0.295	55.58	Q, PB
7	2	7	Yevgeniya Isakova	Russia		55.64	Q
8	4	4	Fabienne Kohlmann	Germany	0.449	55.69	Q, PB
9	2	6	Élodie Ouédraogo	Belgium		55.80	Q, SB
10	3	8	Eilidh Child	Great Britain & N.I.	0.231	55.82	Q
11	3	6	Natalia Ivanova	Russia	0.243	55.83	Q
12	2	8	Hanna Yaroshchuk	Ukraine	0.322	55.88	q
13	4	1	Ieva Zunda	Latvia	0.262	56.02	Q, SB
14	1	2	Manuela Gentili	Italy	0.190	56.14	q
15	4	7	Marzena Kościelniak	Poland	0.449	56.52	q, PB
16	3	1	Zuzana Bergrová	Czech Republic	0.242	56.55	q
17	1	3	Nikolina Horvat	Croatia	0.255	56.64	SB
18	3	4	Patrícia Lopes	Portugal	0.326	56.78	PB
19	3	3	Ilona Ranta	Finland	0.209	56.94	SB
20	1	8	Stine Tomb	Norway	0.217	57.10	PB
21	1	5	Sofie Persson	Sweden		57.23	PB
22	4	6	Sara Petersen	Denmark	0.242	57.28	SB
23	1	1	Justine Kinney	Ireland	0.196	57.39	
24	2	1	Michelle Carey	Ireland	0.295	57.58	SB
25	4	2	Anastasiya Rabchenyuk	Ukraine	0.239	57.72	
26	3	5	Brona Furlong	Ireland	0.320	58.13	
27	2	4	Birsen Engin	Turkey	0.200	58.19	
28	2	2	Kristín Birna Ólafsdóttir-Johnson	Iceland	0.182	58.34	
29	4	8	Kristina Volfová	Czech Republic	0.294	58.42	
30	2	5	Laia Forcadell	Spain		58.80	
31	3	7	Özge Gürler	Turkey	0.210	58.98	
32	4	5	Amaliya Sharoyan	Armenia		1:03.37	

=== Semifinals ===
First 3 in each heat and 2 best performers advance to the Final.

==== Semifinal 1 ====
Rank	Lane	Name	Nationality	React	Time	Notes
1	5	Angela Moroșanu	Romania	0.210	54.67	Q, SB
2	3	Vania Stambolova	Bulgaria	0.251	54.73	Q
3	6	Yevgeniya Isakova	Russia	0.212	54.81	Q, SB
4	4	Eilidh Child	Great Britain & N.I.	0.169	55.27	q
5	7	Natalia Ivanova	Russia	0.303	55.31	q, SB
6	1	Hanna Yaroshchuk	Ukraine	0.232	56.29	
7	2	Zuzana Bergrová	Czech Republic	0.250	57.41	
8	8	Élodie Ouédraogo	Belgium	0.200	58.60	

==== Semifinal 2 ====
Rank	Lane	Name	Nationality	React	Time	Notes
1	4	Natalya Antyukh	Russia	0.203	54.28	Q
2	6	Zuzana Hejnová	Czech Republic	0.203	54.61	Q
3	3	Perri Shakes-Drayton	Great Britain & N.I.	0.258	54.73	Q, PB
4	5	Fabienne Kohlmann	Germany	0.170	55.49	PB
5	8	Hanna Titimets	Ukraine	0.299	55.84	
6	7	Ieva Zunda	Latvia	0.240	56.37	
7	2	Manuela Gentili	Italy	0.198	56.56	
8	1	Marzena Koscielniak	Poland	0.254	56.72	

==== Summary ====
Rank	Semifinal	Lane	Name	Nationality	React	Time	Notes
1	2	4	Natalya Antyukh	Russia		54.28	Q
2	2	6	Zuzana Hejnová	Czech Republic		54.61	Q
3	1	5	Angela Moroșanu	Romania		54.67	Q, SB
4	2	3	Perri Shakes-Drayton	Great Britain & N.I.		54.73	Q, PB
4	1	3	Vania Stambolova	Bulgaria		54.73	Q
6	1	6	Yevgeniya Isakova	Russia		54.81	Q, SB
7	1	4	Eilidh Child	Great Britain & N.I.		55.27	q
8	1	7	Natalia Ivanova	Russia		55.31	q, SB
9	2	5	Fabienne Kohlmann	Germany		55.49	PB
10	2	8	Hanna Titimets	Ukraine		55.84	
11	1	1	Hanna Yaroshchuk	Ukraine		56.29	
12	2	7	Ieva Zunda	Latvia		56.37	
13	2	2	Manuela Gentili	Italy		56.56	
14	2	1	Marzena Kościelniak	Poland		56.72	
15	1	2	Zuzana Bergrová	Czech Republic		57.41	
16	1	8	Élodie Ouédraogo	Belgium		58.60	

=== Final ===
Rank	Lane	Name	Nationality	React	Time	Notes
1st place, gold medalist(s)	6	Natalya Antyukh	Russia	0.182	52.92	CR, EL
2nd place, silver medalist(s)	5	Vania Stambolova	Bulgaria	0.283	53.82	NR
3rd place, bronze medalist(s)	7	Perri Shakes-Drayton	Great Britain & N.I.	0.270	54.18	PB
4	3	Zuzana Hejnová	Czech Republic	0.183	54.30	
5	4	Angela Moroșanu	Romania	0.230	54.58	SB
6	8	Yevgeniya Isakova	Russia	0.208	54.59	SB
7	1	Natalia Ivanova	Russia	0.268	55.51	
8	2	Eilidh Child	Great Britain & N.I.	0.199	55.51	
