= San Marino at the European Athletics Championships =

- WA code: SMR
- National federation: Federazione Sammarinese Atletica Leggera
- Website: https://www.fsal.sm
- Medals: Gold 0 Silver 0 Bronze 0 Total 0

European Athletics Championships appearances (overview)
- 1990; 1994–1998; 2002; 2006; 2010; 2012; 2014; 2016; 2018; 2022; 2024

San Marino has competed at 10 editions of the European Athletics Championships. After beginning at the 1990 championships, the team has competed at every edition of the event since 2002.

San Marino's youngest competitor was Ivano Bucci at 19 years 249 days old at the 2006 European Athletics Championships. Their oldest entrant was Sara Maroncelli, aged 28 years 151 days at the 2010 European Athletics Championships. Eugenio Rossi has the most appearances with 4 showings.

Rossi hoped to earn San Marino's first medal at the 2016 European Championships, thanks to his 2.27 m personal best which would have placed him 5th in the high jump at the 2014 championships.

The Federazione Sammarinese Atletica Leggera was founded in 1969 and it became a member of World Athletics in 1976.

== Performances ==
=== 1990 ===
Athlete	Event	Heat		Semifinal		Final	
Athlete	Event	Result	Rank	Result	Rank	Result	Rank
Domenico Fabien Canti	100 metres	11.20	8h3	Did not advance			

=== 2002 ===
Athlete	Event	Heat		Semifinal		Final	
Athlete	Event	Result	Rank	Result	Rank	Result	Rank
Gian Nicola Berardi	Men's 100 m	10.73	7h5	Did not advance			

=== 2006 ===
Athlete	Event	Heat		Semifinal		Final	
Athlete	Event	Result	Rank	Result	Rank	Result	Rank
Ivano Bucci	Men's 400 m	48.86	8h1	Did not advance			
Barbara Rustignoli	Women's 100 m hurdles	16.05	8h5	Did not advance			

=== 2010 ===
Athlete	Event	Heats		Semifinal		Final	
Athlete	Event	Result	Rank	Result	Rank	Result	Rank
Ivano Bucci	Men's 400 m	49.03	7				31
Sara Maroncelli	Women's 100 m	12.64	7				30

=== 2012 ===
Athlete	Event	Heat		Semifinal		Final	
Athlete	Event	Result	Rank	Result	Rank	Result	Rank
Eugenio Rossi	High jump	2.00	32	Did not advance			

=== 2014 ===
Athlete	Event	Heat		Semifinal		Final	
Athlete	Event	Result	Rank	Result	Rank	Result	Rank
Eugenio Rossi	Men's high jump	—N/a		2.19 m	7q2	Did not advance	
Martina Pretelli	Women's 100 m	12.68	7h1	Did not advance			

=== 2016 ===
Athlete	Event	Qualification		Final	
Athlete	Event	Distance	Position	Distance	Position
Eugenio Rossi	High jump	2.23	=13	did not advance	

=== 2018 ===
Athlete	Event	Heat		Semifinal		Final	
Athlete	Event	Result	Rank	Result	Rank	Result	Rank
Andrea Ercolani Volta	Women's 400 m hurdles	53.86	7h3	Did not advance			
Eugenio Rossi	Men's high jump	—N/a		NH	11q1	Did not advance	

=== 2022 ===
Athlete	Event	Heat		Semifinal		Final	
Athlete	Event	Result	Rank	Result	Rank	Result	Rank
Francesco Sansovini	100 m	10.82	17	Did not advance			
Andrea Ercolani Volta	400 m hurdles	52.59 SB	25	Did not advance			

=== 2024 ===
Athlete	Event	Heat		Semifinal		Final	
Athlete	Event	Result	Rank	Result	Rank	Result	Rank
Francesco Sansovini	Men's 100 metres	10.55 SB	22	Did not advance			
Alessandra Gasparelli	Women's 100 metres	11.60 =SB	18	Did not advance			
