= Great Britain at the 2010 European Athletics Championships =

Sporting event delegation

The United Kingdom competed under the name Great Britain and Northern Ireland. The nation was represented by 72 athletes at the 2010 European Athletics Championships held in Barcelona, Spain.

With a squad of 72 athletes, Great Britain and Northern Ireland sent the fifth largest national team of the competition. The nation won a record 19 medals over the course of the six-day championships, beating their previous greatest medal haul of 18 from the 1990 European Athletics Championships. Head coach Charles van Commenee praised a number of athletes, saying that the team performance was good in terms of building towards the 2012 London Olympics. A number of high-profile athletes were missing from the squad due to injuries, including three 2008 Olympic medallists (Christine Ohuruogu, Tasha Danvers, and Germaine Mason), as well as women's marathon runners Paula Radcliffe and Mara Yamauchi.

Both the men's and women's 4 × 100 m relay teams had difficulties with baton changeovers, resulting in poor performances in an event that the country is typically strong: the women's team was sixth in their heat while the men missed the final by finishing in fifth place.

== Participants ==
Event	Men	Women
100 m	Dwain Chambers; James Dasaolu; Mark Lewis-Francis	Laura Turner
200 m	Marlon Devonish; Christian Malcolm; Jeffrey Lawal-Balogun	Emily Freeman
400 m	Michael Bingham; Martyn Rooney; Conrad Williams	Lee McConnell
800 m	Michael Rimmer	Jenny Meadows; Marilyn Okoro; Jemma Simpson
1500 m	Andrew Baddeley; Colin McCourt; Thomas Lancashire	Hannah England; Lisa Dobriskey; Stephanie Twell
5000 m	Mo Farah; Chris Thompson	
10,000 m	Mo Farah; Chris Thompson	
Marathon	Andi Jones; Lee Merrien; Ben Moreau; Dan Robinson; Dave Webb; Martin Williams	Helen Decker; Susan Partridge; Michelle Ross-Cope; Rebecca Robinson; Holly Rush; Jo Wilkinson
110/100 m hurdles	William Sharman; Andy Turner	
400 m hurdles	David Greene; Rhys Williams; Nathan Woodward	Eilidh Child; Perri Shakes-Drayton
3000 m steeplechase		Hatti Dean; Barbara Parker
High Jump	Martyn Bernard; Tom Parsons	
Pole Vault		Kate Dennison
Long Jump	Greg Rutherford; Chris Tomlinson	
Triple Jump	Nathan Douglas; Phillips Idowu	
Shot Put	Carl Myerscough	
Decathlon/Heptathlon		Jessica Ennis
20 km walk		Joanna Jackson
4 × 100 m relay	James Dasaolu; Marlon Devonish; Leon Baptiste; Jeffery Lawal Balogun; Mark Lewis-Francis; Christian Malcolm; Craig Pickering	Montell Douglas; Katherine Endacott; Emily Freeman; Hayley Jones; Joice Maduaka; Elaine O'Neill; Laura Turner
4 × 400 m relay	Michael Bingham; Richard Buck; Graham Hedman; Martyn Rooney; Andrew Steele; Rob Tobin; Conrad Williams	Vicki Barr; Lee McConnell; Marilyn Okoro; Nadine Okyere; Nicola Sanders; Perri Shakes-Drayton; Kim Wall

== Results ==
2010 Barcelona	Gold	Silver	Bronze	Total
Great Britain (GBR)	6	7	6	19

=== Men ===
Track and road events

Event	Athletes	Heats		Semifinal		Final	
Event	Athletes	Result	Rank	Result	Rank	Result	Rank
100 m	Dwain Chambers	10.21	2 Q	10.10	2 Q	10.18	5
100 m	James Dasaolu	10.40	12 Q	10.31	10	Did not advance	
100 m	Mark Lewis-Francis	10.23	3 Q	10.21 SB	6 q	10.18 SB	Silver medal
200 m	Marlon Devonish	20.68	4 Q	20.55 SB	3 Q	20.62	4
200 m	Christian Malcolm	20.63	2 Q	20.58	4 Q	20.38 SB	Silver medal
200 m	Jeffrey Lawal-Balogun	20.93	15 Q	20.85	13	Did not advance	
400 m	Michael Bingham	45.49	1 Q	44.88 SB	4 Q	45.23	Silver medal
400 m	Martyn Rooney	45.72	3 Q	45.00	5 q	45.23	Bronze medal
400 m	Conrad Williams	46.35	17 Q	46.60	20	Did not advance	
800 m	Michael Rimmer	1:49.99	10 Q	1:47.67	1 Q	1:47.17	Silver medal
1500 m	Andrew Baddeley	3:41.46	3 Q			3:43.87	6
1500 m	Colin McCourt	3:41.77	7 Q			3:44.78	9
1500 m	Thomas Lancashire	3:41.68	6 Q			3:44.92	10
5000 m	Mo Farah	13:38.26	7 Q			13:31.18	Gold medal
5000 m	Chris Thompson	13:35.58	4 Q			13:44.42	8
10,000 m	Mo Farah					28:24.99	Gold medal
10,000 m	Chris Thompson					28:27.33	Silver medal
110 m hurdles	William Sharman	13.60	7 Q	DSQ		Did not advance	
110 m hurdles	Andy Turner	13.48	2 Q	13.50	4 Q	13.28 SB	Gold medal
400 m hurdles	Dai Greene	50.11	4 Q	49.48	1 Q	48.12 PB	Gold medal
400 m hurdles	Rhys Williams	49.35	1 Q	49.61	2 Q	48.96 PB	Silver medal
400 m hurdles	Nathan Woodward	50.45	9 Q	50.51	10	Did not advance	
4 × 100 m relay	James Dasaolu; Marlon Devonish; Leon Baptiste; Jeffrey Lawal-Balogun; Mark Lewis-Francis; Christian Malcolm; Craig Pickering	39.49	9			Did not advance	
4 × 400 m relay	Michael Bingham; Richard Buck; Graham Hedman; Martyn Rooney; Andrew Steele; Robert Tobin; Conrad Williams	3:04.09	3 Q			3:02.25	2nd place, silver medalist(s)
Marathon	Andi Jones					DNF	-
Marathon	Lee Merrien					2:20;42	8
Marathon	Ben Moreau					2:27:08	24
Marathon	Dan Robinson					2:24:06	19
Marathon	Dave Webb					2:23:04	16
Marathon	Martin Williams					2:28:30	28

Field events

Event	Athletes	Qualification		Final	
Event	Athletes	Result	Rank	Result	Rank
Long jump	Chris Tomlinson	8.20 m	3 Q	8.23 m SB	Bronze medal
High jump	Martin Bernard	2.26 m	7 q	2.29 m SB	Bronze medal
High jump	Tom Parsons	2.23 m	11 q	NM	-
Triple jump	Nathan Douglas	16.80 m	12 Q	16.48 m	10
Triple jump	Phillips Idowu	17.10 m	4 Q	17.81 PB	Gold medal
Shot put	Carl Mysercough	19.81 m	10 q	18.19 m	12

=== Women ===
Track and road events

Event	Athletes	Heats		Semifinal		Final	
Event	Athletes	Result	Rank	Result	Rank	Result	Rank
100 m	Laura Turner	11.45	7 Q	11.41	13	Did not advance	
200 m	Emily Freeman	23.44	7 Q	23.21 SB	9	Did not advance	
400 m	Lee McConnell	53.15	12	Did not advance			
800 m	Jennifer Meadows	1:58.90	2 Q			1:59.39	Bronze medal
800 m	Marilyn Okoro	2:01.33 SB	4	Did not advance			
800 m	Jemma Simpson	1:59.18	1 Q			1:59.90	5
1500 m	Hannah England	4:06.03	10 q			4:05.07	10
1500 m	Lisa Dobriskey	4:06.00	9 Q			4:01.54	4
1500 m	Steph Twell	4:05.63	7 q			4:02.70	7
400 m hurdles	Eilidh Child	55.82	10 Q	55.27	7 q	55.51	8
400 m hurdles	Perri Shakes-Drayton	55.35	4 Q	54.73 PB	4 Q	54.18 PB	Bronze medal
3000 m steeplechase	Hatti Dean	9:46.43	9 Q			9:30.19 PB	4
3000 m steeplechase	Barbara Parker	10:20.99	20	Did not advance			
4 × 100 m relay	Joice Maduaka; Montell Douglas; Hayley Jones; Laura Turner	44.09	10			Did not advance	
4 × 400 m relay	Nicola Sanders; Perri Shakes-Drayton; Marilyn Okoro; Lee McConnell; Vicki Barr	3:28.01	3 Q			3:24.32	Bronze medal
Marathon	Helen Decker					2:43:00	21
Marathon	Susan Partridge					2:39:07	16
Marathon	Michelle Ross-Cope					2:38:45	14
Marathon	Rebecca Robinson					2:44:06	24
Marathon	Holly Rush					2:42:44	20
Marathon	Jo Wilkinson					2:44:11	25
20 km walk	Johanna Jackson					1:33:33	10

Field events

Event	Athletes	Qualification		Final	
Event	Athletes	Result	Rank	Result	Rank
Pole vault	Kate Dennison	4.35	3 q	4.55 =SB	6
Heptathlon	Jessica Ennis			6823 PB	Gold medal
