= 2010 European Athletics Championships – Men's javelin throw =

Men's javelin throw at the European Athletics Championships

The men's javelin throw at the 2010 European Athletics Championships was held at the Estadi Olímpic Lluís Companys on 30 and 31 July.

== Medalists ==
Gold	Andreas Thorkildsen; Norway (NOR)
Silver	Matthias de Zordo; Germany (GER)
Bronze	Tero Pitkämäki; Finland (FIN)

== Records ==
Standing records prior to the 2010 European Athletics Championships
World record	Jan Železný (CZE)	98.48	Jena, Germany	25 May 1996
European record	Jan Železný (CZE)	98.48	Jena, Germany	25 May 1996
Championship record	Steve Backley (GBR)	89.72	Budapest, Hungary	23 August 1998
World Leading	Andreas Thorkildsen (NOR)	90.37	Florø, Norway	29 May 2010
European Leading	Andreas Thorkildsen (NOR)	90.37	Florø, Norway	29 May 2010

== Schedule ==
Date	Time	Round
30 July 2010	10:20	Qualification
31 July 2010	20:05	Final

== Results ==
=== Qualification ===
Qualification: Qualification Performance 81.00 (Q) or at least 12 best performers advance to the final

Rank	Group	Athlete	Nationality	#1	#2	#3	Result	Notes
1	A	Teemu Wirkkala	Finland	76.89	83.57		83.57	Q
2	B	Tero Pitkämäki	Finland	76.65	83.15		83.15	Q
3	A	Matthias de Zordo	Germany	74.89	77.82	82.34	82.34	Q
4	A	Ainārs Kovals	Latvia	78.58	78.22	79.32	79.32	q
5	B	Dmytro Kosynskyy	Ukraine	x	71.30	79.29	79.29	q
6	A	Andreas Thorkildsen	Norway	x	x	78.82	78.82	q
7	B	Ēriks Rags	Latvia	x	x	78.45	78.45	q
8	A	Roman Avramenko	Ukraine	74.84	x	78.11	78.11	q
9	A	Vítězslav Veselý	Czech Republic	x	77.76	74.99	77.76	q
10	B	Petr Frydrych	Czech Republic	77.56	x	75.96	77.56	q
11	B	Oleksandr Pyatnytsya	Ukraine	77.20	x	77.54	77.54	q
12	A	Sergey Makarov	Russia	76.69	74.13	74.54	76.69	q
13	A	Csongor Olteán	Hungary	76.53	75.05	x	76.53	
14	B	Uladzimir Kazlou	Belarus	x	76.29	72.33	76.29	
15	A	Gabriel Wallin	Sweden	71.85	x	76.12	76.12	
16	A	Jakub Vadlejch	Czech Republic	x	76.04	x	76.04	
17	B	Harri Haatainen	Finland	75.83	x	x	75.83	
18	B	Jérôme Haeffler	France	67.60	75.60	x	75.60	
19	B	Rafael Baraza	Spain	71.96	68.22	73.34	73.34	
20	B	Martin Benák	Slovakia	73.18	x	x	73.18	
21	B	Ilya Korotkov	Russia	72.04	x	71.07	72.04	
22	A	Ioánnis Smaliós	Greece	71.57	x	–	71.57	
23	B	Vadims Vasiļevskis	Latvia	x	x	67.56	67.56	

=== Final ===
Rank	Athlete	Nationality	#1	#2	#3	#4	#5	#6	Result	Notes
1st place, gold medalist(s)	Andreas Thorkildsen	Norway	86.32	88.37	86.30	84.12	–	83.40	88.37	
2nd place, silver medalist(s)	Matthias de Zordo	Germany	86.22	87.81	87.06	x	x	84.12	87.81	PB
3rd place, bronze medalist(s)	Tero Pitkämäki	Finland	81.47	x	82.30	83.96	86.67	86.31	86.67	
4	Oleksandr Pyatnytsya	Ukraine	81.24	80.91	78.91	82.01	76.59	x	82.01	
5	Teemu Wirkkala	Finland	78.52	76.94	81.76	x	81.14	81.31	81.76	
6	Ainārs Kovals	Latvia	81.19	x	x	x	75.19	80.55	81.19	
7	Sergey Makarov	Russia	80.86	78.31	78.89	x	x	–	80.86	
8	Roman Avramenko	Ukraine	x	x	78.65	x	x	79.52	79.52	
9	Vítězslav Veselý	Czech Republic	69.42	x	77.83				77.83	
10	Petr Frydrych	Czech Republic	77.30	76.69	76.76				77.30	
11	Ēriks Rags	Latvia	x	76.93	76.08				76.93	
12	Dmytro Kosynskyy	Ukraine	x	73.26	73.11				73.26	
