= 2010 European Athletics Championships – Women's 100 metres =

Women's 100 metres at the 2010 European Athletics Championships
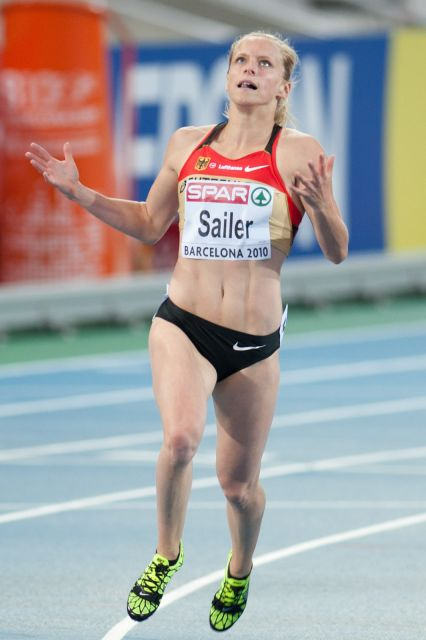
- Sailer of Germany took the women's 100 metres title.
- Venue: Estadi Olímpic Lluís Companys
- Location: Barcelona
- Dates: 28 July (heats); 29 July (semifinals & final)
- Competitors: 32 from 20 nations
- Winning time: 11.10

Medalists
| gold medal | Verena Sailer | Germany |
| silver medal | Véronique Mang | France |
| bronze medal | Myriam Soumaré | France |

The women's 100 metres at the 2010 European Athletics Championships was held at the Estadi Olímpic Lluís Companys on 28 and 29 July.

== Records ==
Standing records prior to the 2010 European Athletics Championships
| World record | Florence Griffith Joyner (USA) | 10.49 | Indianapolis, United States | 16 July 1988 |
| European record | Christine Arron (FRA) | 10.73 | Budapest, Hungary | 19 August 1998 |
| Championship record | Christine Arron (FRA) | 10.73 | Budapest, Hungary | 19 August 1998 |
| World Leading | Veronica Campbell-Brown (JAM) | 10.78 | Eugene, United States | 3 July 2010 |
| European Leading | Alena Neumiarzhitskaya (BLR) | 11.05 | Hrodna, Belarus | 26 June 2010 |

== Schedule ==
| Date | Time | Round |
|---|---|---|
| 28 July 2010 | 10:40 | Round 1 |
| 29 July 2010 | 20:20 | Semifinals |
| 29 July 2010 | 21:45 | Final |

== Results ==
=== Round 1 ===
First 3 in each heat (Q) and 4 best performers (q) advance to the Semifinals.

==== Heat 1 ====
| Rank | Lane | Name | Nationality | React | Time | Notes |
|---|---|---|---|---|---|---|
| 1 | 1 | Ezinne Okparaebo | Norway | 0.183 | 11.35 | Q |
| 2 | 8 | Myriam Soumaré | France | 0.195 | 11.35 | Q, =SB |
| 3 | 4 | Yuna Mekhti-Zade | Russia | 0.184 | 11.52 | Q |
| 4 | 7 | Ailis McSweeney | Ireland | 0.174 | 11.52 | q |
| 5 | 6 | Alena Neumiarzhitskaya | Belarus | 0.210 | 11.63 | |
| 6 | 2 | Tina Murn | Slovenia | 0.235 | 11.70 | SB |
| 7 | 3 | Andreea Ograzeanu | Romania | 0.206 | 11.78 | |
| 8 | 5 | Manuela Levorato | Italy | 0.171 | 11.80 | |
| | | | | Wind: -0.7 m/s | | |

==== Heat 2 ====
| Rank | Lane | Name | Nationality | React | Time | Notes |
|---|---|---|---|---|---|---|
| 1 | 5 | Véronique Mang | France | 0.144 | 11.35 | Q |
| 2 | 2 | Yeoryía Koklóni | Greece | 0.182 | 11.50 | Q |
| 3 | 6 | Olesya Povh | Ukraine | 0.151 | 11.58 | Q |
| 4 | 7 | Yasmin Kwadwo | Germany | 0.205 | 11.68 | |
| 5 | 1 | Kateřina Čechová | Czech Republic | 0.188 | 11.69 | |
| 6 | 4 | Inna Eftimova | Bulgaria | 0.168 | 11.79 | |
| 7 | 3 | Marika Popowicz | Poland | 0.218 | 11.80 | |
| 8 | 8 | Ivana Rozman | Macedonia | 0.194 | 12.90 | |
| | | | | Wind: -1.9 m/s | | |

==== Heat 3 ====
| Rank | Lane | Name | Nationality | React | Time | Notes |
|---|---|---|---|---|---|---|
| 1 | 4 | Verena Sailer | Germany | 0.180 | 11.27 | Q |
| 2 | 7 | Mariya Ryemyen | Ukraine | 0.208 | 11.38 | Q |
| 3 | 5 | Christine Arron | France | 0.207 | 11.45 | Q |
| 4 | 6 | Digna Luz Murillo | Spain | 0.165 | 11.52 | q |
| 5 | 1 | Yuliya Katsura | Russia | 0.183 | 11.57 | |
| 6 | 3 | Ivet Lalova | Bulgaria | 0.156 | 11.58 | |
| 7 | 8 | Yulia Nestsiarenka | Belarus | 0.179 | 11.58 | |
| 8 | 2 | Lena Berntsson | Sweden | 0.202 | 11.84 | |
| | | | | Wind: -1.5 m/s | | |

==== Heat 4 ====
| Rank | Lane | Name | Nationality | React | Time | Notes |
|---|---|---|---|---|---|---|
| 1 | 3 | Anna Gurova | Russia | 0.174 | 11.42 | Q |
| 2 | 7 | Laura Turner | Great Britain & N.I. | 0.203 | 11.45 | Q |
| 3 | 6 | Lina Grinčikaitė | Lithuania | 0.208 | 11.48 | Q |
| 4 | 5 | Anne Möllinger | Germany | 0.166 | 11.51 | q |
| 5 | 2 | Nataliya Pohrebnyak | Ukraine | 0.175 | 11.53 | q |
| 6 | 1 | Yuliya Balykina | Belarus | 0.214 | 11.55 | |
| 7 | 8 | Sara Maroncelli | San Marino | 0.210 | 12.64 | PB |
| | 4 | Folake Akinyemi | Norway | 0.170 | DNF | |
| | | | | Wind: -0.6 m/s | | |

==== Summary ====
| Rank | Heat | Lane | Name | Nationality | React | Time | Note |
|---|---|---|---|---|---|---|---|
| 1 | 3 | 4 | Verena Sailer | Germany | 0.180 | 11.27 | Q |
| 2 | 2 | 5 | Véronique Mang | France | 0.144 | 11.35 | Q |
| 2 | 1 | 1 | Ezinne Okparaebo | Norway | 0.183 | 11.35 | Q |
| 2 | 1 | 8 | Myriam Soumaré | France | 0.195 | 11.35 | Q, =SB |
| 5 | 3 | 7 | Mariya Ryemyen | Ukraine | 0.208 | 11.38 | Q |
| 6 | 4 | 3 | Anna Gurova | Russia | 0.174 | 11.42 | Q |
| 7 | 3 | 5 | Christine Arron | France | 0.207 | 11.45 | Q |
| 7 | 4 | 7 | Laura Turner | Great Britain & N.I. | 0.203 | 11.45 | Q |
| 9 | 4 | 6 | Lina Grinčikaitė | Lithuania | 0.208 | 11.48 | Q |
| 10 | 2 | 2 | Yeoryía Koklóni | Greece | 0.182 | 11.50 | Q |
| 11 | 4 | 5 | Anne Möllinger | Germany | 0.166 | 11.51 | q |
| 12 | 1 | 7 | Ailis McSweeney | Ireland | 0.174 | 11.52 | q |
| 12 | 1 | 4 | Yuna Mekhti-Zade | Russia | 0.184 | 11.52 | Q |
| 12 | 3 | 6 | Digna Luz Murillo | Spain | 0.165 | 11.52 | q |
| 15 | 4 | 2 | Nataliya Pohrebnyak | Ukraine | 0.175 | 11.53 | q |
| 16 | 4 | 1 | Yuliya Balykina | Belarus | 0.214 | 11.55 | |
| 17 | 3 | 1 | Yuliya Katsura | Russia | 0.183 | 11.57 | |
| 18 | 3 | 3 | Ivet Lalova | Bulgaria | 0.156 | 11.58 | |
| 18 | 3 | 8 | Yulia Nestsiarenka | Belarus | 0.179 | 11.58 | |
| 18 | 2 | 6 | Olesya Povh | Ukraine | 0.151 | 11.58 | Q |
| 21 | 1 | 6 | Alena Neumiarzhitskaya | Belarus | 0.210 | 11.63 | |
| 22 | 2 | 7 | Yasmin Kwadwo | Germany | 0.205 | 11.68 | |
| 23 | 2 | 1 | Kateřina Čechová | Czech Republic | 0.188 | 11.69 | |
| 24 | 1 | 2 | Tina Murn | Slovenia | 0.235 | 11.70 | SB |
| 25 | 1 | 3 | Andreea Ograzeanu | Romania | 0.206 | 11.78 | |
| 26 | 2 | 4 | Inna Eftimova | Bulgaria | 0.168 | 11.79 | |
| 27 | 1 | 5 | Manuela Levorato | Italy | 0.171 | 11.80 | |
| 27 | 2 | 3 | Marika Popowicz | Poland | 0.218 | 11.80 | |
| 29 | 3 | 2 | Lena Berntsson | Sweden | 0.202 | 11.84 | |
| 30 | 4 | 8 | Sara Maroncelli | San Marino | 0.210 | 12.64 | PB |
| 31 | 2 | 8 | Ivana Rozman | Macedonia | 0.194 | 12.90 | |
| | 4 | 4 | Folake Akinyemi | Norway | 0.170 | DNF | |

=== Semifinals ===
First 3 in each heat and 2 best performers advance to the Final.

==== Semifinal 1 ====
| Rank | Lane | Name | Nationality | React | Time | Notes |
|---|---|---|---|---|---|---|
| 1 | 5 | Véronique Mang | France | 0.152 | 11.12 | Q, PB |
| 2 | 4 | Ezinne Okparaebo | Norway | 0.182 | 11.23 | Q, NR |
| 3 | 3 | Mariya Ryemyen | Ukraine | 0.219 | 11.25 | Q, PB |
| 4 | 7 | Lina Grinčikaitė | Lithuania | 0.194 | 11.35 | SB |
| 5 | 6 | Laura Turner | Great Britain & N.I. | 0.200 | 11.41 | |
| 6 | 8 | Yuna Mekhti-Zade | Russia | 0.196 | 11.43 | |
| 7 | 1 | Digna Luz Murillo | Spain | 0.167 | 11.44 | |
| 8 | 2 | Anne Möllinger | Germany | 0.196 | 11.60 | |
| | | | | Wind: +1.0 m/s | | |

==== Semifinal 2 ====
| Rank | Lane | Name | Nationality | React | Time | Notes |
|---|---|---|---|---|---|---|
| 1 | 5 | Verena Sailer | Germany | 0.187 | 11.06 | Q |
| 2 | 4 | Myriam Soumaré | France | 0.184 | 11.13 | Q |
| 3 | 8 | Christine Arron | France | 0.170 | 11.24 | Q |
| 4 | 3 | Yeoryía Koklóni | Greece | 0.216 | 11.26 | q |
| 5 | 6 | Anna Gurova | Russia | 0.179 | 11.31 | q |
| 6 | 2 | Ailis McSweeney | Ireland | 0.148 | 11.32 | |
| 7 | 7 | Olesya Povh | Ukraine | 0.171 | 11.33 | |
| 8 | 1 | Nataliya Pohrebnyak | Ukraine | 0.169 | 11.34 | |
| | | | | Wind: +2.2 m/s | | |

==== Summary ====
| Rank | Semifinal | Lane | Name | Nationality | React | Time | Notes |
|---|---|---|---|---|---|---|---|
| 1 | 2 | 5 | Verena Sailer | Germany | 0.187 | 11.06 | Q |
| 2 | 1 | 5 | Véronique Mang | France | 0.152 | 11.12 | Q |
| 3 | 2 | 4 | Myriam Soumaré | France | 0.184 | 11.13 | Q |
| 4 | 1 | 4 | Ezinne Okparaebo | Norway | 0.182 | 11.23 | Q, NR |
| 5 | 2 | 8 | Christine Arron | France | 0.170 | 11.24 | Q |
| 6 | 1 | 3 | Mariya Ryemyen | Ukraine | 0.219 | 11.25 | Q, PB |
| 7 | 2 | 3 | Yeoryía Koklóni | Greece | 0.216 | 11.26 | q |
| 8 | 2 | 6 | Anna Gurova | Russia | 0.179 | 11.31 | q |
| 9 | 2 | 2 | Ailis McSweeney | Ireland | 0.148 | 11.32 | |
| 10 | 2 | 7 | Olesya Povh | Ukraine | 0.171 | 11.33 | |
| 11 | 2 | 1 | Nataliya Pohrebnyak | Ukraine | 0.169 | 11.34 | |
| 12 | 1 | 7 | Lina Grinčikaitė | Lithuania | 0.194 | 11.35 | SB |
| 13 | 1 | 6 | Laura Turner | Great Britain & N.I. | 0.200 | 11.41 | |
| 14 | 1 | 8 | Yuna Mekhti-Zade | Russia | 0.196 | 11.43 | |
| 15 | 1 | 1 | Digna Luz Murillo | Spain | 0.167 | 11.44 | |
| 16 | 1 | 2 | Anne Möllinger | Germany | 0.196 | 11.60 | |

=== Final ===
| Rank | Lane | Name | Nationality | React | Time | Notes |
|---|---|---|---|---|---|---|
| 1st place, gold medalist(s) | 4 | Verena Sailer | Germany | 0.161 | 11.10 | PB |
| 2nd place, silver medalist(s) | 5 | Véronique Mang | France | 0.173 | 11.11 | PB |
| 3rd place, bronze medalist(s) | 3 | Myriam Soumaré | France | 0.166 | 11.18 | PB |
| 4 | 6 | Ezinne Okparaebo | Norway | 0.203 | 11.23 | NR |
| 5 | 8 | Mariya Ryemyen | Ukraine | 0.239 | 11.31 | |
| 6 | 2 | Anna Gurova | Russia | 0.189 | 11.36 | |
| 7 | 1 | Yeoryía Koklóni | Greece | 0.174 | 11.36 | |
| 8 | 7 | Christine Arron | France | 0.176 | 11.37 | |
| | | | | Wind: -0.6 m/s | | |
