= 2013 French Athletics Championships =

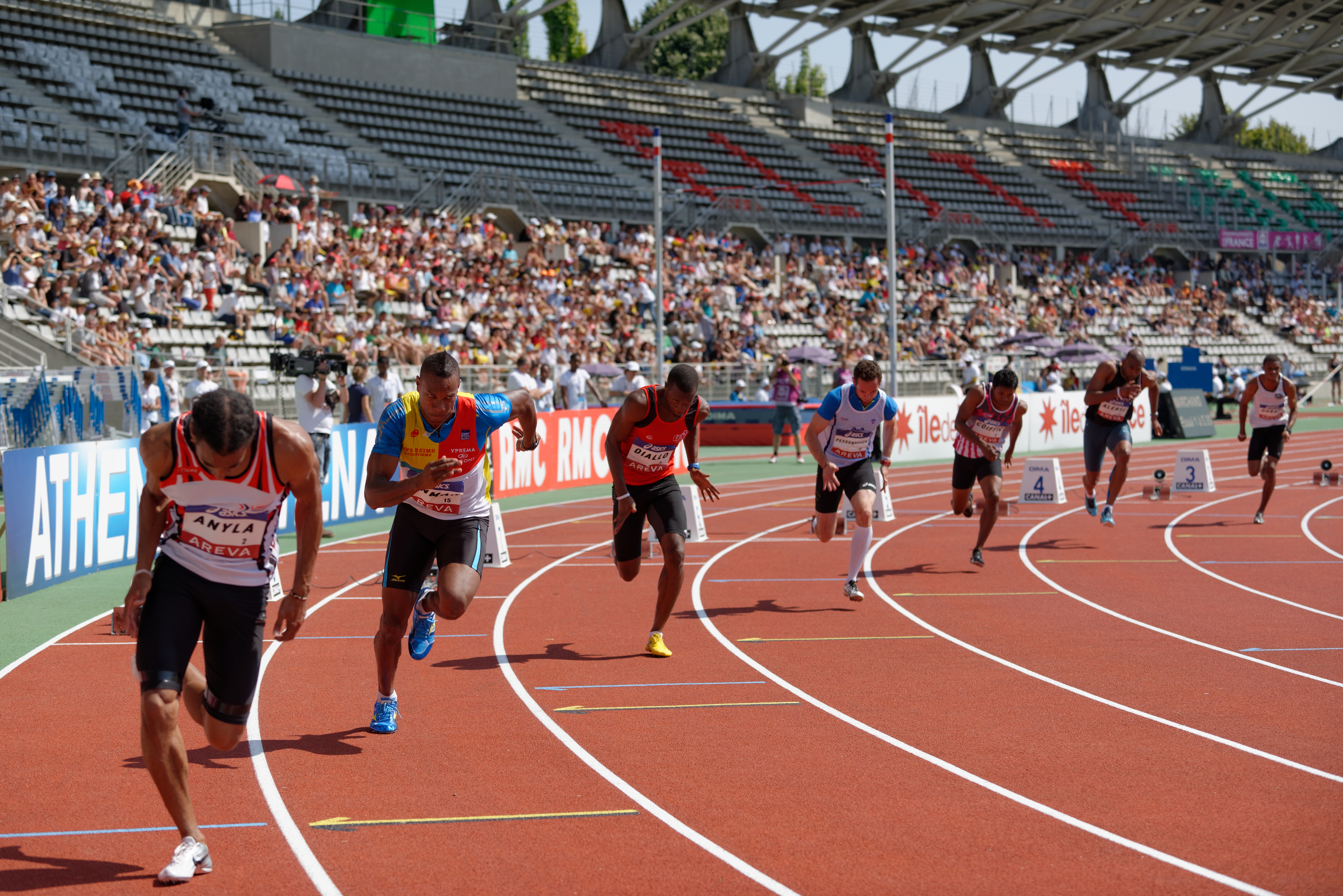
- The men's 200 m race
- Dates: 12–14 July
- Host city: Paris
- Venue: Stade Sébastien Charléty
- Events: 38

The 2013 French Athletics Championships was the 125th edition of the national championship in outdoor track and field for France. It was held on 12–14 July at the Stade Sébastien Charléty in Paris. A total of 38 events (divided evenly between the sexes) were contested over the three-day competition.

== Results ==
=== Men ===
Event	Gold		Silver		Bronze	
100 metres	Jimmy Vicaut	9.95	Christophe Lemaitre	10.19	Emmanuel Biron	10.25
200 metres	Christophe Lemaitre	20.34	David Alerte	20.74	Teddy Tinmar	20.96
400 metres	Mame-Ibra Anne	46.05	Angel Chelala	46.27	Mamoudou Hanne	46.43
800 metres	Hamid Oualich	1:47.87	Paul Renaudie	1:48.10	Azzedine Boudjemaa	1:48.26
1500 metres	Florian Carvalho	3:47.87	Simon Denissel	3:48.15	Bouabdellah Tahri	3:48.59
5000 metres	Noureddine Smaïl	13:49.68	Abdellatif Meftah	14:00.85	Timothée Bommier	14:06.36
10,000 m walk	Kévin Campion	38:37.02	Yohann Diniz	39:27.63	Bertrand Moulinet	40:50.26
110 m hurdles	Thomas Martinot-Lagarde	13.30	Dimitri Bascou	13.64	Ladji Doucouré	13.66
400 m hurdles	Yoann Décimus	49.52	Mickaël François	49.55	Hugo Grillas	50.0
3000 m s'chase	Mahiedine Mekhissi-Benabbad	8:46.57	Noureddine Smaïl	8:46.76	Yoann Kowal	8:50.55
4 × 100 m relay	AS Aix-les-Bains; Thibaut Van Tilbeurgh; Christophe Lemaitre; Pierre-Alexis Pessonneaux; Fabrice Tisgra	39.96	Val de Reuil AC	40.22	EFS Reims A.	40.33
High jump	Mickaël Hanany	2.31 m	Fabrice Saint-Jean	2.25 m	Florian Labourel	2.18 m
Pole vault	Renaud Lavillenie	5.95 m WL	Damiel Dossévi	5.55 m	Alexandre Feger	5.45 m
Long jump	Salim Sdiri	8.10 m	Kafétien Gomis	8.02 m	Nicolas Gomont	7.99 m
Triple jump	Teddy Tamgho	17.49 m	Yoann Rapinier	17.45 m	Benjamin Compaoré	16.57 m
Shot put	Gaëtan Bucki	19.33 m	Tumatai Dauphin	19.00 m	Frédéric Dagée	18.30 m
Discus throw	Jean-François Aurokiom	58.48 m	Stéphane Marthely	58.11 m	Jean-Claude Retel	53.94 m
Hammer throw	Jérôme Bortoluzzi	72.49 m	Frédérick Pouzy	70.60 m	Bruno Boccalatte	67.65 m
Javelin throw	Vitolio Tipotio	71.74 m	Ali Hamidou Soultoini	70.91 m	Grégory Camus	70.17 m
Decathlon	Gaël Querin	8148 pts	Bastien Auzeil	8022 pts	Romain Martin	7571 pts

=== Women ===
Event	Gold		Silver		Bronze	
100 metres	Myriam Soumaré	11.30	Céline Distel-Bonnet	11.32	Ayodelé Ikuesan	11.34 PB=
200 metres	Myriam Soumaré	22.96	Johanna Danois	23.14	Émilie Gaydu	23.24
400 metres	Floria Gueï	52.05	Marie Gayot	52.26	Muriel Hurtis	52.31
800 metres	Clarisse Moh	2:04.47	Ophélie Claude-Boxberger	2:06.64	Aude Korotchansky	2:07.57
1500 metres	Laurane Picoche	4:25.88	Sandra Beuvière	4:25.89	Alice Rocquain	4:28.49
5000 metres	Sophie Duarte	15:49.24	Christelle Daunay	15:54.34	Christine Bardelle	16:04.55
10,000 m walk	Violaine Averous	48:16.97	Marine Quennehen	49:10.72	Amandine Marcou	49:49.36
100 m hurdles	Cindy Billaud	12.59	Alice Decaux	12.70	Reïna-Flor Okori	12.83
400 m hurdles	Phara Anacharsis	56.07	Myrnah Bloud	58.60	Saren Mariko	59.60
3000 m s'chase	Claire Perraux	10:00.80	Meriem Mered	10:01.26	Mathilde Chachignon	10:01.26
4 × 100 m relay	Speedy Plus	46.07	Neuily-Plaisance Sports	46.98	Union Sportive Baie Mahaultien	47.86
High jump	Mélanie Melfort	1.85 m	Sandrine Champion	1.82 m	Chloé Traisnel	1.76 m
Pole vault	Marion Lotout	4.50 m	Marion Buisson	4.25 m	Vanessa Boslak	4.15 m
Long jump	Éloyse Lesueur	6.49 m	Eunice Barber	6.31 m	Noémie Combettes	6.31 m
Triple jump	Teresa Nzola Meso Ba	13.95 m	Nathalie Marie-Nely	13.37 m	Amy Zongo-Filet	13.37 m
Shot put	Jessica Cérival	16.88 m	Myriam Lixfe	16.18 m	Antoinette Nana Djimou	14.84 m
Discus throw	Mélina Robert-Michon	59.55 m	Pauline Pousse	55.44 m	Irène Donzelot	53.63 m
Hammer throw	Stéphanie Falzon	69.78 m	Alexandra Tavernier	68.82 m	Jessika Guehaseim	65.25 m
Javelin throw	Mathilde Andraud	56.02 m	Antoinette Nana Djimou	54.28 m	Alexia Kogut Kubiak	54.26 m
Heptathlon	Camille Le Joly	5560 pts	Merryl Mbeng	5558 pts	Anaelle Nyabeu Djapa	5482 pts
