= Iceland at the 2010 European Athletics Championships =

Sporting event delegation

Iceland will be represented by 6 athletes at the 2010 European Athletics Championships held in Barcelona, Spain.

== Participants ==
Event	Men	Women
400 m hurdles	Björgvin Vikingsson	Kristín Birna Ólafsdóttir-Johnson
Long Jump	Thorsteinn Ingvarsson	
Shot Put	Ódinn Björn Thorsteinsson	
Javelin Throw		Ásdís Hjálmsdóttir
Heptathlon		Helga Margrét Thorsteinsdóttir

== Results ==
=== Men ===
Track and road events

Event	Athletes	Heat Round 1		Semifinal		Final	
Event	Athletes	Result	Rank	Result	Rank	Result	Rank
400 m hurdles	Björgvin Vikingsson	54.46	27	did not advance			

Field events

Event	Athletes	Qualification		Final	
Event	Athletes	Result	Rank	Result	Rank
Long jump	Thorsteinn Ingvarsson	7.59	26	did not advance	
Shot put	Ódinn Björn Thorsteinsson	NM		did not advance	

=== Women ===
Track and road events

Event	Athletes	Heat Round 1		Semifinal		Final	
Event	Athletes	Result	Rank	Result	Rank	Result	Rank
400 m hurdles	Kristín Birna Ólafsdóttir-Johnson	58.34	28	did not advance			

Field events

Event	Athletes	Qualification		Final	
Event	Athletes	Result	Rank	Result	Rank
Javelin throw	Ásdís Hjálmsdóttir	56.55 q	12	54.32	10
Heptathlon	Helga Margrét Thorsteinsdóttir			DNF	

== Results ==
2010 Barcelona	Gold	Silver	Bronze	Total
Iceland (ISL)	0	0	0	0
