= San Marino at the 2024 European Athletics Championships =

- Flag of San Marino
- WA code: SMR

in Rome, Italy 7 June 2024 – 12 June 2024
- Competitors: 2 (1 man and 1 woman)

European Athletics Championships appearances (overview)
- 1990; 1994–1998; 2002; 2006; 2010; 2012; 2014; 2016; 2018; 2022; 2024

San Marino competed at the 2024 European Athletics Championships in Rome, Italy from 7–12 June 2024.

== Results ==
San Marino entered the following athletes.

Key

- Q = Qualified for the next round
- q = Qualified for the next round as a fastest loser or, in field events, by position without achieving the qualifying target
- NR = National record
- PB = Personal best
- SB = Season best
- N/A = Round not applicable for the event

=== Men ===
Track and road events

Athlete	Event	Heat		Semifinal		Final	
Athlete	Event	Result	Rank	Result	Rank	Result	Rank
Francesco Sansovini	100 metres	10.55 SB	22	Did not advance			

=== Women ===
Track and road events

Athlete	Event	Heat		Semifinal		Final	
Athlete	Event	Result	Rank	Result	Rank	Result	Rank
Alessandra Gasparelli	100 metres	11.60 =SB	18	Did not advance			
