= 2010 World Junior Championships in Athletics – Women's heptathlon =

The women's heptathlon event at the 2010 World Junior Championships in Athletics was held in Moncton, New Brunswick, Canada, at Moncton Stadium on 22 and 23 July.

== Medalists ==
Gold	Dafne Schippers; Netherlands
Silver	Sara Gambetta; Germany
Bronze	Helga Margrét Þorsteinsdóttir; Iceland

== Results ==
=== Final ===
22/23 July

The highest mark recorded in each event is highlighted in yellow

Rank	Name	Nationality	100m H	HJ	SP	200m	LJ	JT	800m	Points	Notes
1st place, gold medalist(s)	Dafne Schippers	Netherlands	13.87 (w: 1.0 m/s)	1.63	13.03	23.41 w (w: 2.1 m/s)	6.35	38.03	2:18.57	5967	
2nd place, silver medalist(s)	Sara Gambetta	Germany	14.74 (w: 0.7 m/s)	1.75	13.28	24.50 w (w: 2.1 m/s)	6.32	37.45	2:26.93	5770	
3rd place, bronze medalist(s)	Helga Margrét Þorsteinsdóttir	Iceland	14.39 (w: 0.5 m/s)	1.63	13.10	25.62 (w: 1.6 m/s)	5.55	49.47	2:15.81	5706	
4	Grete Šadeiko	Estonia	14.77 (w: 0.5 m/s)	1.69	10.86	25.02 (w: 1.6 m/s)	6.03	46.01	2:16.08	5705	
5	Tilia Udelhoven	Germany	14.30 (w: 1.0 m/s)	1.66	10.50	25.15 w (w: 2.1 m/s)	6.12	43.89	2:16.57	5677	
6	Laura Ikauniece	Latvia	14.57 (w: 0.5 m/s)	1.69	10.80	25.47 (w: 1.6 m/s)	5.85	49.04	2:21.40	5618	
7	Xénia Kriszán	Hungary	14.52 (w: 0.7 m/s)	1.57	12.28	25.25 (w: 1.6 m/s)	5.94	43.68	2:16.32	5594	
8	Linda Treiel	Estonia	15.17 (w: -0.2 m/s)	1.75	13.17	26.70 w (w: 3.1 m/s)	5.60	43.98	2:24.10	5453	
9	Martina Salander	Sweden	14.57 (w: -0.2 m/s)	1.63	12.88	24.85 w (w: 2.1 m/s)	5.87	35.22	2:24.01	5446	
10	Alex Gochenour	United States	13.97 (w: 0.7 m/s)	1.63	11.17	24.49 w (w: 3.1 m/s)	5.35	33.10	2:23.71	5260	
11	Anastasiya Mokhnyuk	Ukraine	14.08 (w: 1.0 m/s)	1.63	11.00	26.25 (w: 1.6 m/s)	6.02	31.13	2:22.50	5252	
12	Elodie Jakob	Switzerland	14.15 (w: 1.0 m/s)	1.54	9.25	25.96 (w: 1.6 m/s)	5.80	41.38	2:19.34	5219	
13	Michelle Zeltner	Switzerland	14.83 (w: -0.2 m/s)	1.66	11.90	25.23 w (w: 3.1 m/s)	5.39	29.62	2:21.52	5130	
14	Camille Le Joly	France	14.76 (w: -0.2 m/s)	1.69	9.50	25.81 w (w: 3.1 m/s)	5.73	30.83	2:19.43	5118	
15	Agnieszka Borowska	Poland	14.74 (w: 0.7 m/s)	1.66	10.04	26.92 w (w: 3.1 m/s)	5.86	37.34	2:27.64	5078	
16	Josephine Rohr	Sweden	14.59 (w: 0.5 m/s)	1.57	11.90	25.90 w (w: 3.1 m/s)	5.73	32.52	2:28.55	5061	
17	Katrine Haarklau	Norway	14.52 (w: 0.5 m/s)	1.54	12.32	26.48 (w: 1.6 m/s)	5.36	39.27	2:26.50	5060	
18	Sarah Chauchard	France	14.63 (w: 0.5 m/s)	1.57	10.49	26.05 w (w: 2.1 m/s)	5.59	36.83	2:24.11	5049	
19	Rachael McIntosh	Canada	14.90 (w: -0.2 m/s)	1.60	10.72	25.88 w (w: 3.1 m/s)	5.32	28.13	2:22.27	4858	
20	Mihaela Gutu	Romania	14.04 (w: 1.0 m/s)	1.54	9.85	26.02 w (w: 2.1 m/s)	5.58	33.16	2:35.57	4839	
21	Eva Vivod	Slovenia	15.32 (w: -0.2 m/s)	1.51	10.12	26.33 w (w: 3.1 m/s)	4.90	43.26	2:33.57	4649	
	Yelena Molodchinina	Russia	14.52 (w: 1.0 m/s)	1.69	11.88	25.96 w (w: 2.1 m/s)	NM	DNS	DNS	DNF	
	Ashley Smith	United States	14.25 (w: 0.7 m/s)	1.60	10.67	24.53 w (w: 2.1 m/s)	DNS	DNS	DNS	DNF	
	Lucija Cvitanovic	Croatia	15.00 (w: 0.7 m/s)	1.60	10.99	DNS	DNS	DNS	DNS	DNF	

== Participation ==
According to an unofficial count, 24 athletes from 18 countries participated in the event.

- Canada (1)
- Croatia (1)
- Estonia (2)
- France (2)
- Germany (2)
- Hungary (1)
- Iceland (1)
- Latvia (1)
- Netherlands (1)
- Norway (1)
- Poland (1)
- Romania (1)
- Russia (1)
- Slovenia (1)
- Sweden (2)
- Switzerland (2)
- Ukraine (1)
- United States (2)
