= San Marino at the 2022 European Championships =

in (Germany) Munich 11 August 2022 – 21 August 2022
- Competitors: 4 in 2 sports
- Medals: Gold 0 Silver 0 Bronze 0 Total 0

European Championships appearances
- 2018; 2022

San Marino competed at the 2022 European Championships in Munich, Germany, from 11–21 August 2018.

== Competitors ==
The following is the list of number of competitors in the Championships:

| Sport | Men | Women | Total |
|---|---|---|---|
| Athletics | 2 | 0 | 2 |
| Table tennis | 2 | 0 | 2 |
| Total | 4 | 0 | 4 |

== Athletics ==
San Marino entered the following athletes.

Key

- Q = Qualified for the next round
- q = Qualified for the next round as a fastest loser or, in field events, by position without achieving the qualifying target
- NR = National record
- PB = Personal best
- SB = Season best
- N/A = Round not applicable for the event

=== Men ===
Track and road events

| Athlete | Event | Heat | | Semifinal | | Final | |
| Athlete | Event | Result | Rank | Result | Rank | Result | Rank |
|---|---|---|---|---|---|---|---|
| Francesco Sansovini | 100 m | 10.82 | 17 | Did not advance | | | |
| Andrea Ercolani Volta | 400 m hurdles | 52.59 SB | 25 | Did not advance | | | |
