= Manuela Gentili =

Italian hurdler (born 1978)

Personal information
- Nationality: Italian
- Born: 7 February 1978 (age 48) Castel San Giovanni, Italy
- Height: 1.63 m (5 ft 4 in)
- Weight: 52 kg (115 lb)

Sport
- Country: Italy
- Sport: Athletics
- Event: 400 metres hurdles
- Club: Cus Palermo
- Coached by: Carla Barbarino

Achievements and titles
- Personal best: 400 m hs: 55.54 (2012)
Medal record
Mediterranean Games
Bronze medal – third place	2013 Mersin	400 metres hs

Manuela Gentili (born 7 February 1978 in Castel San Giovanni) is an Italian hurdler.

== Biography ==
She is coached by former athlete Carla Barbarino since 2004.

== Achievements ==
Year	Competition	Venue	Position	Event	Performance	Notes
2010	European Championships	(Spain) Barcelona	elim. semif.	400 m hurdles	56"56	
2011	European Team Championships	(Sweden) Stockholm	5th	400 m hurdles	56"85	
2011	World Championships	(South Korea) Daegu	elim. qualif.	400 m hurdles	56"66	

== National titles ==
- 3 wins in 400 m hurdles at the Italian Athletics Championships (2010, 2011, 2012)

== See also ==
- Italian all-time top lists - 400 metres hurdles
