= Claudia Salman =

German heptathlete (born 1986)

Claudia Salman-Rath
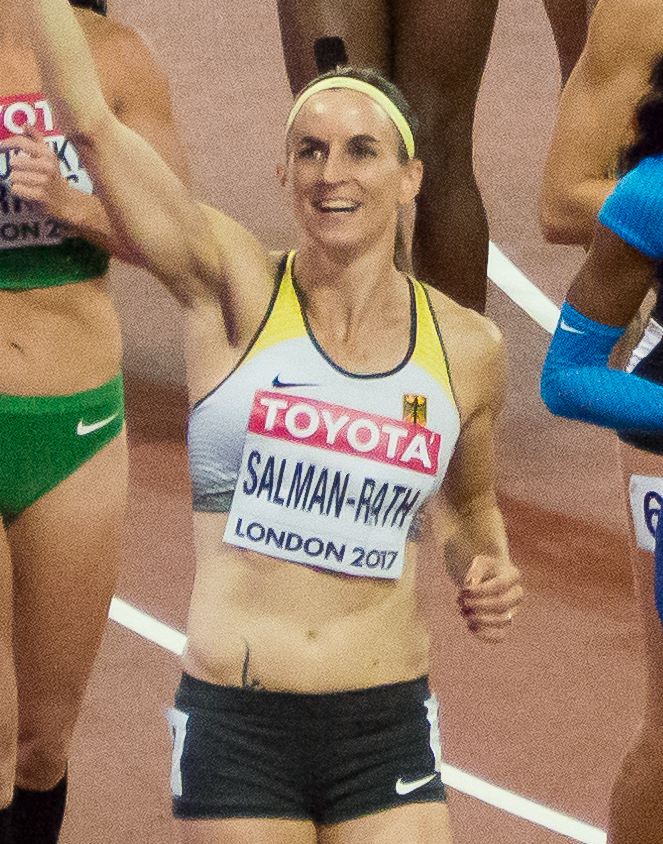
- Salman-Rath at the 2017 World Championships in London

Personal information
- Born: Claudia Rath; 25 April 1986 (age 40) Hadamar, West Germany
- Height: 1.75 m (5 ft 9 in)

Sport
- Country: Germany
- Sport: Athletics
- Event: Heptathlon

Achievements and titles
- Regional finals: 7th at the 2012 European Athletics Championships
- Personal bests: 200 m: 23.77 (05/2014); 800 m: 2:06.43 (08/2013); 100 m hurdles: 13.46 (06/2013); 400 m hurdles: 1:00.90 (05/2003); High jump: 1.83 (08/2013); Long jump: 6.67 (08/2013); Shot put: 13.78 (05/2014); Javelin: 43.45 (08/2014); Heptathlon: 6462 (08/2013)
Medal record
European Indoor Championships
Bronze medal – third place	2017 Belgrade	Long jump

Claudia Salman-Rath (née Rath; born 25 April 1986, in Hadamar) is a German athlete who specialises in the heptathlon.

Rath represented Germany at the 2010 European Championships in Athletics where she finished 11th in the heptathlon, scoring a personal best of 6107 points. She followed this up with a win at the national heptathlon championships, scoring 5746 points.

== International competitions ==
Year	Competition	Venue	Position	Event	Notes
Representing Germany
2010	European Championships	Barcelona, Spain	11th	Heptathlon	6107 pts
2012	European Championships	Helsinki, Finland	7th	Heptathlon	6210 pts
2013	World Championships	Moscow, Russia	4th	Heptathlon	6462 pts
2014	World Indoor Championships	Sopot, Poland	5th	Pentathlon	4681 pts
2014	European Championships	Zürich, Switzerland	8th	Heptathlon	6225 pts
2015	World Championships	Beijing, China	5th	Heptathlon	6441 pts
2016	Olympic Games	Rio de Janeiro, Brazil	14th	Heptathlon	6267 pts
2017	European Indoor Championships	Belgrade, Serbia	3rd	Long jump	6.94 m
2017	World Championships	London, United Kingdom	8th	Heptathlon	6362 pts
