= Ukraine at the 2010 European Athletics Championships =

- Flag of Ukraine
- WA code: UKR
- National federation: Ukrainian Athletic Federation

in Barcelona, Spain 27 July 2010 – 1 August 2010
- Competitors: 61 (30 men and 31 women)
- Medals Ranked 7th: Gold 2 Silver 4 Bronze 1 Total 7

European Athletics Championships appearances
- 1994; 1998; 2002; 2006; 2010; 2012; 2014; 2016; 2018; 2022; 2024; 2026

Other related appearances
- Soviet Union (1946–1990)

Ukraine competed at the 2010 European Athletics Championships in Barcelona, Spain, between 27 July and 1 August 2010.

Among the prominent representatives of Ukraine were reigning Olympic heptathlon champion Nataliya Dobrynska and 2008 Olympic bronze medallist Denys Yurchenko in the pole vault, as well as decathlete Oleksiy Kasyanov, pole vaulter Maksym Mazuryk, and 800 metres runner Yuliya Krevsun – all of whom were fourth in their disciplines at the 2009 World Championships in Athletics. None of the three Ukrainians who won medals at the 2006 European Athletics Championships returned for the 2010 edition.

At the competition, long jumper Olha Saladukha became the country's first gold medallist of the championships. Dobrynska and Mazuryk were both runners-up in their events. The less established Stanislav Melnykov took the 400 metres hurdles bronze medal, while Yelizaveta Bryzhina surprised with a 200 metres personal best for the silver medal.

== Medallists ==
Medal	Name	Event	Date
Gold	Olesya Povh, Nataliya Pohrebnyak, Mariya Ryemyen, Yelizaveta Bryzhina	Women's 4 × 100 metres relay	1 August
Gold	Olha Saladukha	Women's triple jump	31 July
Silver	Maksym Mazuryk	Men's pole vault	31 July
Silver	Yelizaveta Bryzhina	Women's 200 metres	31 July
Silver	Tetyana Filonyuk	Women's marathon	31 July
Silver	Nataliya Dobrynska	Women's heptathlon	31 July
Bronze	Stanislav Melnykov	Men's 400 metres hurdles	31 July

== Results ==
Ukraine entered the following athletes.

Key

- Q = Qualified for the next round
- q = Qualified for the next round as a fastest loser or, in field events, by position without achieving the qualifying target
- NR = National record
- PB = Personal best
- SB = Season best
- N/A = Round not applicable for the event

=== Men ===
Track and road events

Athlete	Event	Heat		Semifinal		Final	
Athlete	Event	Result	Rank	Result	Rank	Result	Rank
Ihor Bodrov	200 m	20.98	=18	Did not advance			
Dmytro Ostrovskyy	400 m	45.98	8 Q	45.81	14	Did not advance	
Myhaylo Knysh	400 m	46.86	25	Did not advance			
Volodymyr Burakov	400 m	47.03	27	Did not advance			
Serhiy Lebid	5000 m	13:38.51	11 Q	—N/a		13:38.69	4
Stanislav Melnykov	400 m hurdles	50.32	7 Q	49.76	3 Q	49.09 PB	3rd place, bronze medalist(s)
Maksym Nakonechnyy; Myhaylo Knysh; Volodymyr Burakov; Dmytro Ostrovskyy	4 × 400 m relay	3:05.51	9	Did not advance			

Marathon and race walks

Athlete	Event	Result	Rank
Oleksiy Rybalchenko	Marathon	2:27:34	25
Vasyl Matviychuk	Marathon	2:28:26	27
Oleksandr Sitkovskyy	Marathon	DNF	—
Andriy Kovenko	20 km walk	1:22:43 SB	10
Ruslan Dmytrenko	20 km walk	1:22:45	11
Ivan Losyev	20 km walk	1:27:12	21
Andriy Kovenko	50 km walk	DNF	—
Serhiy Budza	50 km walk	DNF	—

Field events

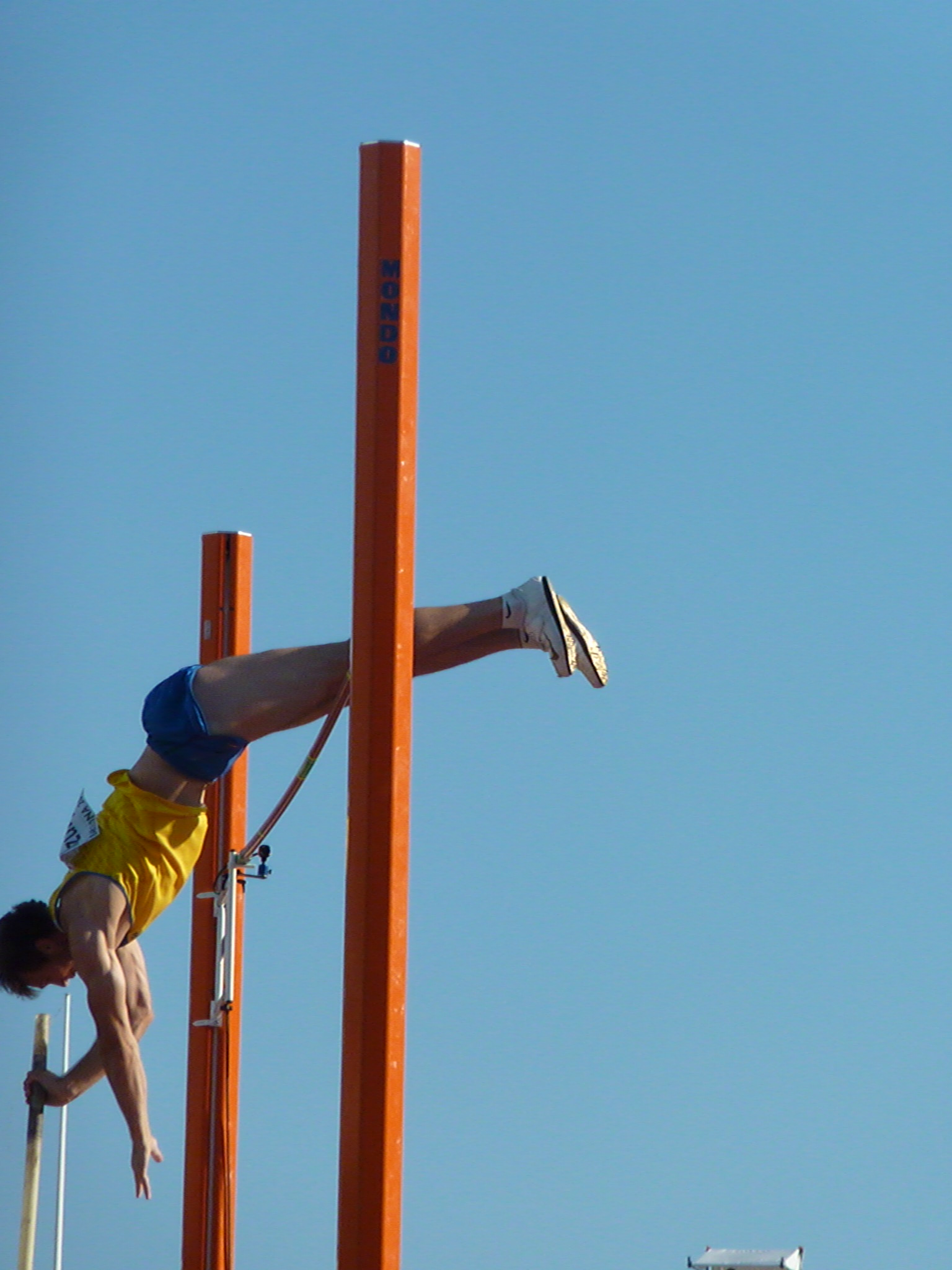
Maksym Mazuryk competing in the final

Athlete	Event	Qualification		Final	
Athlete	Event	Distance	Position	Distance	Position
Oleksandr Nartov	High jump	2.26 SB	9 q	2.26	6
Andriy Protsenko	High jump	2.19	17	Did not advance	
Dmytro Dem'yanyuk	High jump	2.19	=21	Did not advance	
Maksym Mazuryk	Pole vault	5.65	2 Q	5.80 SB	2nd place, silver medalist(s)
Denys Yurchenko	Pole vault	NM (doping) (Note: Denys Yurchenko's qualification result was later voided in connection with a doping case.)		Did not advance	
Oleksandr Soldatkin	Long jump	7.66	22	Did not advance	
Viktor Kuznyetsov	Triple jump	17.22	2 Q	17.29 PB	4
Andriy Semenov	Shot put	19.31	13	Did not advance	
Ivan Hryshyn	Discus throw	58.36	28	Did not advance	
Oleksiy Semenov	Discus throw	56.42	31	Did not advance	
Oleksiy Sokyrskyy	Hammer throw	74.16	12 q	76.62 PB	6
Dmytro Kosynskyy	Javelin throw	79.29	5 q	73.26	12
Roman Avramenko	Javelin throw	78.11	8 q	79.52	8
Oleksandr Pyatnytsya	Javelin throw	77.54	11 q	82.01	4

Combined events – Decathlon

Athlete	Event	100 m	LJ	SP	HJ	400 m	110H	DT	PV	JT	1500 m	Final	Rank
Oleksiy Kasyanov	Result	10.60 SB	7.88	14.27	2.04 SB	49.41	DNS					DNF	—
Oleksiy Kasyanov	Points	952	1030	745	840	842	—					DNF	—
Yevhen Nikitin	Result	11.17	6.75	13.98	DNS							DNF	—
Yevhen Nikitin	Points	823	755	727	—							DNF	—

=== Women ===
Track and road events

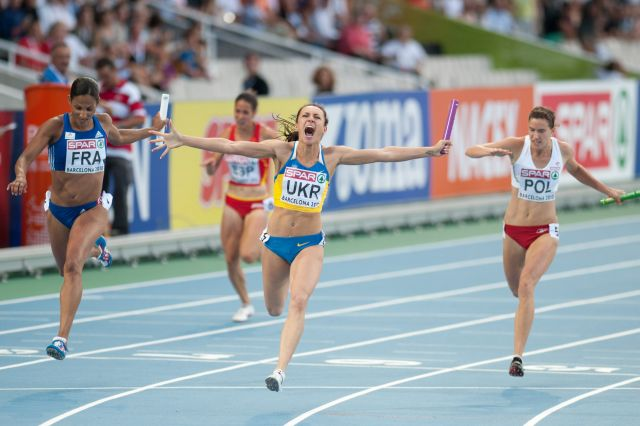
Winning finish for Ukraine's 4x100 m relay

Athlete	Event	Heat		Semifinal		Final	
Athlete	Event	Result	Rank	Result	Rank	Result	Rank
Mariya Ryemyen	100 m	11.38	5 Q	11.25 PB	6 Q	11.31	5
Nataliya Pohrebnyak	100 m	11.53	15 q	11.34	11	Did not advance	
Olesya Povh	100 m	11.58	18 Q	11.33	10	Did not advance	
Yelizaveta Bryzhina	200 m	23.10	1 Q	22.86	3 Q	22.44 PB	2nd place, silver medalist(s)
Antonina Yefremova	400 m	51.67	5 Q	—N/a		51.67	5
Kseniya Karandyuk	400 m	53.18	13	Did not advance			
Darya Prystupa	400 m	53.48	14	Did not advance			
Yuliya Krevsun	800 m	1:59.44	5	Did not advance			
Nataliya Lupu	800 m	2:00.50	9	Did not advance			
Olha Zavhorodnya	800 m	2:03.58	20	Did not advance			
Anna Mishchenko	1500 m	4:05.59	4 q	—N/a		4:07.22	9
Yevheniya Snihur	100 m hurdles	12.90	6 Q	12.88	6 Q	12.92	5
Hanna Titimets	400 m hurdles	55.58 PB	6 Q	55.84	10	Did not advance	
Hanna Yaroshchuk	400 m hurdles	55.88	12 q	56.29	11	Did not advance	
Anastasiya Rabchenyuk	400 m hurdles	57.72	25	Did not advance			
Olesya Povh; Nataliya Pohrebnyak; Mariya Ryemyen; Olena Chebanu (round 1); Yelizaveta Bryzhina (final)	4 × 100 m relay	43.24	1 Q	—N/a		42.29 WL, NR	1st place, gold medalist(s)
Darya Prystupa; Yuliya Krevsun (round 1); Nataliya Lupu (round 1); Hanna Titimets; Alina Lohvychenko (final); Antonina Yefremova (final)	4 × 400 m relay	3:29.50	6 q	—N/a		3:28.03	4

Marathon and race walks

Athlete	Event	Result	Rank
Tetyana Filonyuk	Marathon	2:33:57	2nd place, silver medalist(s)
Svitlana Stanko-Klymenko	Marathon	2:43:35	19
Olena Biloshchuk	Marathon	2:51:21	28
Vira Ovcharuk	Marathon	3:09:27	33

Field events

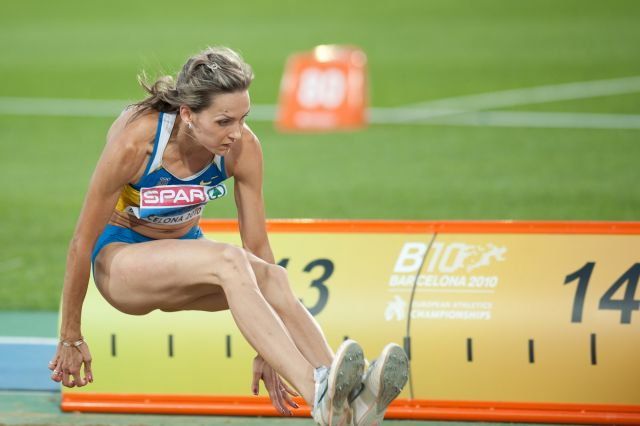
Ukrainian Saladukha leaped to 14.81 m to win the European title.

Athlete	Event	Qualification		Final	
Athlete	Event	Distance	Position	Distance	Position
Viktoriya Styopina	High jump	1.92	=8 Q	1.95 SB	=6
Viktoriya Rybalko	Long jump	6.72	=4 Q	6.78 SB	4
Olha Saladukha	Triple jump	14.49	3 Q	14.81 EL	1st place, gold medalist(s)
Liliya Kulyk	Triple jump	14.04	12	Did not advance	
Kateryna Karsak	Discus throw	55.41	15	Did not advance	
Nataliya Zolotuhina	Hammer throw	69.31	5 Q	67.53	10
Vira Rebryk	Javelin throw	52.31	17	Did not advance	

Combined events – Heptathlon

Athlete	Event	100H	HJ	SP	200 m	LJ	JT	800 m	Final	Rank
Nataliya Dobrynska	Result	13.59 SB	1.86	15.88 SB	24.23 PB	6.56 SB	49.25 PB	2:12.06 PB	6778 PB	2nd place, silver medalist(s)
Nataliya Dobrynska	Points	1037	1054	920	959	1027	846	935	6778 PB	2nd place, silver medalist(s)
Lyudmyla Yosypenko	Result	13.94	1.86 SB	12.98	24.63 SB	6.14	46.92	2:19.97	6206	5
Lyudmyla Yosypenko	Points	987	1054	726	921	893	801	824	6206	5
Hanna Melnychenko	Result	13.84	1.86	13.28 SB	24.83	NM	37.87	DNF	DNF	—
Hanna Melnychenko	Points	1001	1054	746	902	—	626	—	DNF	—
