= Jennifer Oeser =

German heptathlete

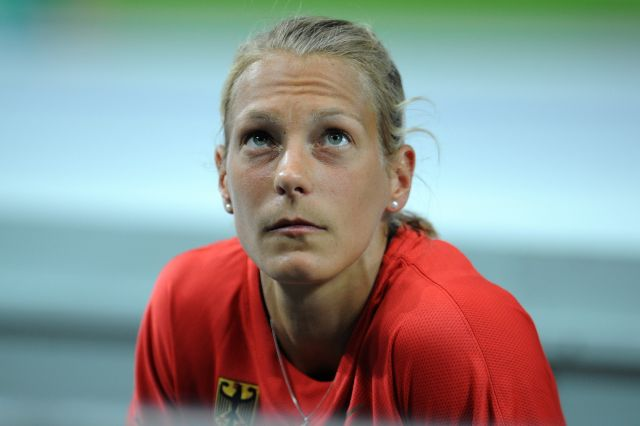
- Oeser at the 2009 Berlin World Championships

Personal information
- Nationality: German
- Born: 29 November 1983 (age 42)
- Height: 1.76 m (5 ft 9 1/2 in)
- Weight: 67 kg (148 lb)

Sport
- Country: Germany
- Sport: Athletics
- Event: Heptathlon
- Coached by: Karl-Heinz Due
Medal record
World Championships
Silver medal – second place	2009 Berlin	Heptathlon
Silver medal – second place	2011 Daegu	Heptathlon
European Championships
Bronze medal – third place	2010 Barcelona	Heptathlon
- Updated on 4 August 2012

Jennifer Oeser (born 29 November 1983 in Brunsbüttel, Schleswig-Holstein) is a retired German heptathlete.

== Career ==
Oeser's first international championship was the 2002 World Junior Championships in Athletics and she finished in eighth place with a score of 5405 points. She improved her personal best to 5901 points to win the gold medal at the 2003 European Athletics U23 Championships. Moving up to the senior ranks, she finished fourth in the heptathlon at the 2006 European Athletics Championships in Gothenburg and was seventh in the event at the 2007 World Championships in Athletics. Oeser was eleventh at the 2008 Summer Olympics in Beijing. She set a personal best of 6493 points to win the silver medal in the heptathlon at the 2009 IAAF World Championships in Berlin. The following year she was at the Erdgas Meeting in Ratingen, Germany, holding off her domestic rival Lilli Schwarzkopf to win with a total of 6427.

== Personal bests ==
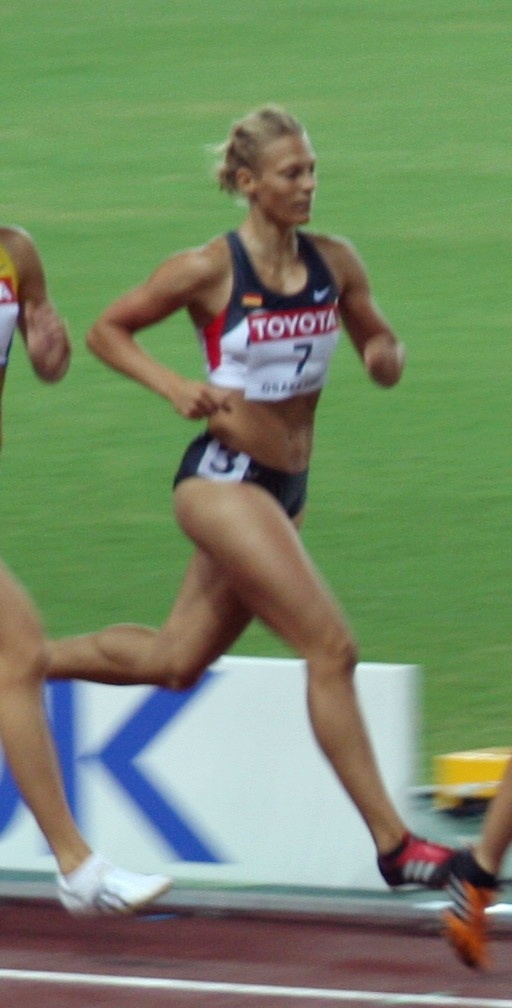
Oeser competing at the 2007 World Championships in Osaka

Event	Mark
100 m hurdles	13.14 s
High jump	1.86 m
Shot put	14.29 m
200 metres	23.95 s
Long jump	6.68 m
Javelin throw	51.30 m
800 metres	2:10.39 min
Heptathlon	6683 points

== Major competition record ==
Year	Competition	Venue	Position	Event	Notes
Representing Germany
2002	World Junior Championships	Kingston, Jamaica	8th	Heptathlon	5405 pts
2003	European U23 Championships	Bydgoszcz, Poland	1st	Heptathlon	5901 pts
2006	European Championships	Gothenburg, Sweden	4th	Heptathlon	6376 pts
2007	World Championships	Osaka, Japan	7th	Heptathlon	6378 pts
2008	Olympic Games	Beijing, China	11th	Heptathlon	6360 pts
2009	World Championships	Berlin, Germany	2nd	Heptathlon	6493 pts
2010	European Championships	Barcelona, Spain	3rd	Heptathlon	6683 pts
2011	World Championships	Daegu, South Korea	2nd	Heptathlon	6572 pts
2015	World Championships	Beijing, China	10th	Heptathlon	6308 pts
2016	Olympic Games	Rio de Janeiro, Brazil	9th	Heptathlon	6401 pts
