= Helga Margrét Þorsteinsdóttir =

Icelandic heptathlete

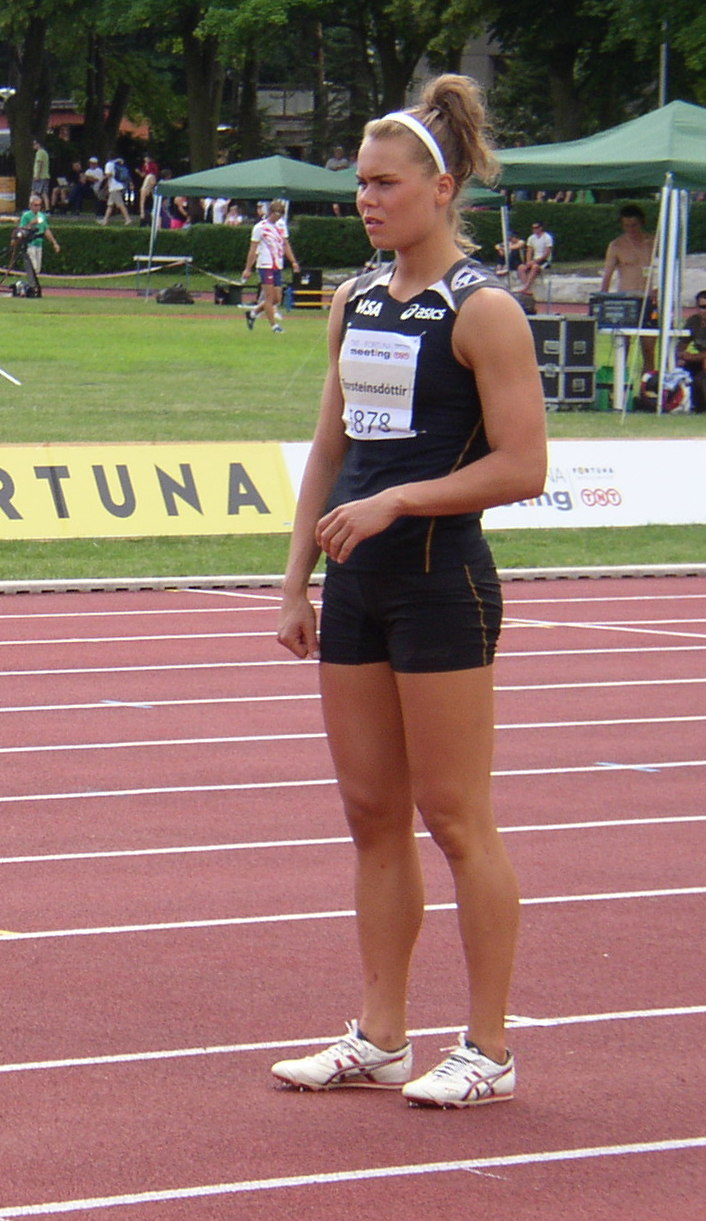
- Helga Margrét Þorsteinsdóttir at the 2011 TNT – Fortuna Meeting in Kladno

Personal information
- Full name: Helga Margrét Þorsteinsdóttir
- Born: 15 November 1991 (age 34) Reykjavík, Iceland

Helga Margrét Þorsteinsdóttir (born 15 November 1991 in Reykjavík) is an Icelandic heptathlete. She holds the national women indoor record in pentathlon, 4.298 points, set in Tallinn 2012.

== Achievements ==
Year	Competition	Venue	Position	Event	Notes
Representing Iceland
2007	World Youth Championships	Ostrava, Czech Republic	5th	Heptathlon	5405
2008	World Junior Championships	Bydgoszcz, Poland	7th	Heptathlon	5516 pts
2010	World Junior Championships	Moncton, Canada	3rd	Heptathlon	5706 pts
2010	European Championships	Barcelona, Spain	—	Heptathlon	DNF
2011	European U23 Championships	Ostrava, Czech Republic	—	Heptathlon	DNF

== Personal life ==
Helga Margrét is the sister of basketball player and power lifter Guðrún Gróa Þorsteinsdóttir.
