= Maren Schwerdtner =

German heptathlete

Maren Schwerdtner (born 3 October 1985) is a German heptathlete. Born in Hanover.

== Achievements ==
Year	Competition	Venue	Position	Event	Notes
Representing Germany
2005	European U23 Championships	Erfurt, Germany	7th	Heptathlon	5641 pts
2007	European U23 Championships	Debrecen, Hungary	9th	Heptathlon	5934 pts
2010	European Championships	Barcelona, Spain	9th	Heptathlon	6167 pts
