= Anna Gurova =

Russian sprinter (born 1981)

Anna Vasilyevna Gurova (Russian: Анна Васильевна Гурова; born April 29, 1981) is a Russian sprint athlete. She came sixth in the 100 metres at the 2010 European Athletics Championships

She received a two-year ban from the sport from August 2011 to 2013 after she tested positive for Methyltestosterone.

== International competitions ==
Representing Russia
Year	Competition	Venue	Position	Event	Notes
2010	European Championships	Barcelona, Spain	6th	100 m	11.36

== See also ==
- List of doping cases in athletics
