= Matthias de Zordo =

German javelin thrower

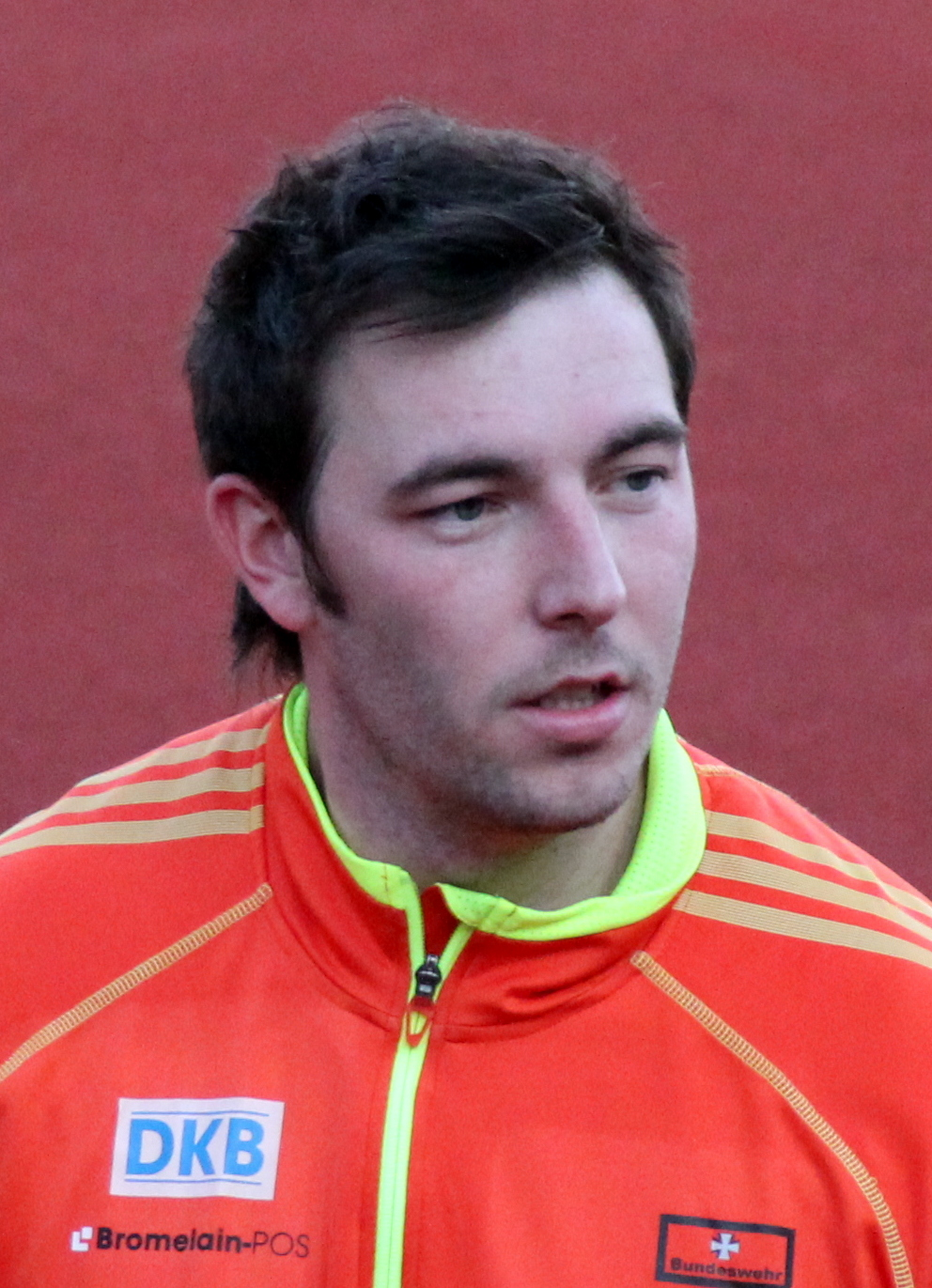
- Matthias de Zordo at the 2012 Bislett Games

Personal information
- Nationality: German
- Born: 21 February 1988 (age 38) Bad Kreuznach, West Germany
- Height: 1.90 m (6 ft 3 in)
- Weight: 97 kg (214 lb)

Sport
- Country: Germany
- Sport: Athletics
- Event: Javelin throw
- Club: SV Saar 05 Saarbrücken

Achievements and titles
- Personal best: 88.36 metres (September 2011)
Medal record
Men's javelin
World Championships
| Gold medal – first place | 2011 Daegu | Javelin throw |
European Athletics Championships
| Silver medal – second place | 2010 Barcelona | Javelin throw |
Continental Cup
| Bronze medal – third place | 2010 Split | Javelin throw |
German Athletics Championships
| Gold medal – first place | 2010 Braunschweig | Javelin throw |
| Gold medal – first place | 2011 Kassel | Javelin throw |
| Silver medal – second place | 2009 Ulm | Javelin throw |

Matthias de Zordo (born 21 February 1988) is a German former athlete competing in the Javelin Throw. He was the former World Champion in the men's javelin throw in 2011. With a throw of 87.81 metres, he won the silver medal at the 2010 European Athletics Championships in Barcelona.

De Zordo was born in Bad Kreuznach. He became German Champion in July 2010 at the 2010 German Athletics Championships in Braunschweig and again at the 2011 German Athletics Championships in Kassel.

In 2011, he won gold at the World Championships in Daegu with a throw of 86.27 metres. He finished off his 2011 season with a win at the Memorial Van Damme in Brussels with a personal best of 88.36 metres. With his win in Brussels, he also secured the Diamond League trophy for the men's javelin.

== Achievements ==
| Year | Competition | Venue | Position | Notes |
Representing Germany
| 2007 | European Junior Championships | Hengelo, Netherlands | 1st | 78.59 m |
| 2009 | European U23 Championships | Kaunas, Lithuania | 8th | 75.40 m |
| 2010 | European Championships | Barcelona, Spain | 2nd | 87.81 m |
| 2011 | World Championships | Daegu, South Korea | 1st | 86.27 m |
| 2012 | Olympic Games | London, United Kingdom | – | NM |

== Seasonal bests by year ==
- 2006 - 71.67
- 2007 - 78.67
- 2008 - 82.51
- 2009 - 80.15
- 2010 - 87.81
- 2011 - 88.36
- 2012 - 81.62
- 2013 - 81.49
