= David Webb (runner) =

British long-distance runner (born 1982)

David Webb (born 17 March 1982) is a British long-distance runner. Webb was selected to compete for Great Britain in the marathon at the London 2012 Olympics based on a personal best time of 2:15:48 he achieved in 2011. He withdrew before the event, however, because of a stress fracture and failed fitness test.

Prior to the London Olympics, he represented Great Britain in the marathon at the 2010 European Athletics Championships, coming 16th, and at the 2011 World Championships in Athletics, placing 15th.
