= Jeffrey Lawal-Balogun =

British athlete

Personal information
- Nationality: British (English)
- Born: 2 July 1986 (age 39)

Sport
- Sport: Athletics
- Event: Sprints
- Club: Kent AC
Medal record
Representing Great Britain
Men's Athletics

Olajide Fuad Lawal-Balogun (born 2 July 1986) is a London-based British former track athlete. Balogun competesd across 60m 100m and 200m distances, and has represented Great Britain at U23 and senior level. He was coached by Clarence Callender, the 1998 Olympic 4 × 100 m Silver medallist.

== Biography ==
Balogun lives in Mottingham, South London, and attended the University of East London, studying marketing.

He was first approached to attend a training session after a Kent AC athlete saw him running to catch a bus in 2006 when he was 19. Balogun's first trial at Kent AC was overseen by Clarence Callender and Donovan Reid. Callender recalled that the first reaction that he and Reid had to Baloguns first trial run was "The next moment, when I looked up he was disappearing into the distance. He had trainers on and he'd never stretched before in his life but he just kept on running and wouldn't stop".

Balogun made his first competitive appearance in the 200 metre event at the British Athletics League National Two on May 6, 2006. He finished 2nd with a time of 22.70 seconds.

Balogun became the 12th all-time fastest British athlete over 200m when he set a time of 20.38 seconds at a meeting in La Chaux-de-Fonds, Switzerland in 2009. He was ranked 2nd in Great Britain over 200 metres in 2009, and in 2010 was ranked 10th in Great Britain over 100 metres. Balogun was awarded a scholarship from the University of East London in 2010, in recognition of his sporting achievements.

== Achievements ==
Date	Venue	Meeting	Distance	Position	Time
27 June 2010	Birmingham	Aviva European Trials and UK Championships	200m	3rd	20.89
30 May 2010	Hengelo	IAAF World Challenge Meeting	100m	4th	10.43
28 May 2010	Dessau	Internationals Leichtathletikmeeting	200m	2nd	20.89
23 May 2010	Loughborough	Loughborough International	200m	2nd	20.86
13 February 2010	Sheffield	Aviva World Trials and UK Championships	60m	6th	6.73
25 September 2009	Daegu	Colourful Daegu Meeting	200m	2nd	20.98
19 September 2009	Gateshead Quays	Great North City Games (Track)	150m	2nd	15.21
15 September 2009	Szczecin	Pedro's Cup	200m	2nd	20.85
15 September 2009	Szczecin	Pedro's Cup	100m	7th	10.63
30 August 2009	Padua	Meeting Citta' Di Padova	100m	7th	10.27
25 August 2009	Tallinn	Big Bank Meeting	200m	3rd	20.74
25 August 2009	Tallinn	Big Bank Meeting	100m	3rd	10.31
15 August 2009	Cardiff	McCain UK Challenge Final	200m	2nd	21.38
15 August 2009	Cardiff	McCain UK Challenge Final	100m	3rd	10.63
12 July 2009	Birmingham	Aviva World Trials and National Championships	200m	4th	20.99
28 June 2009	La Chaux-de-Fonds	Resisprint International	100m	3rd	10.29
17 May 2009	Loughborough	McCain Loughborough International	200m	1st	20.95
17 May 2009	Loughborough	McCain Loughborough International	100m	2nd	10.40
31 January 2009	Birmingham	Birmingham Games	60m	3rd	6.76
18 January 2009	Lee Valley	SEAA Championships	60m	3rd	6.69
