= Camille Le Joly =

French athletics competitor

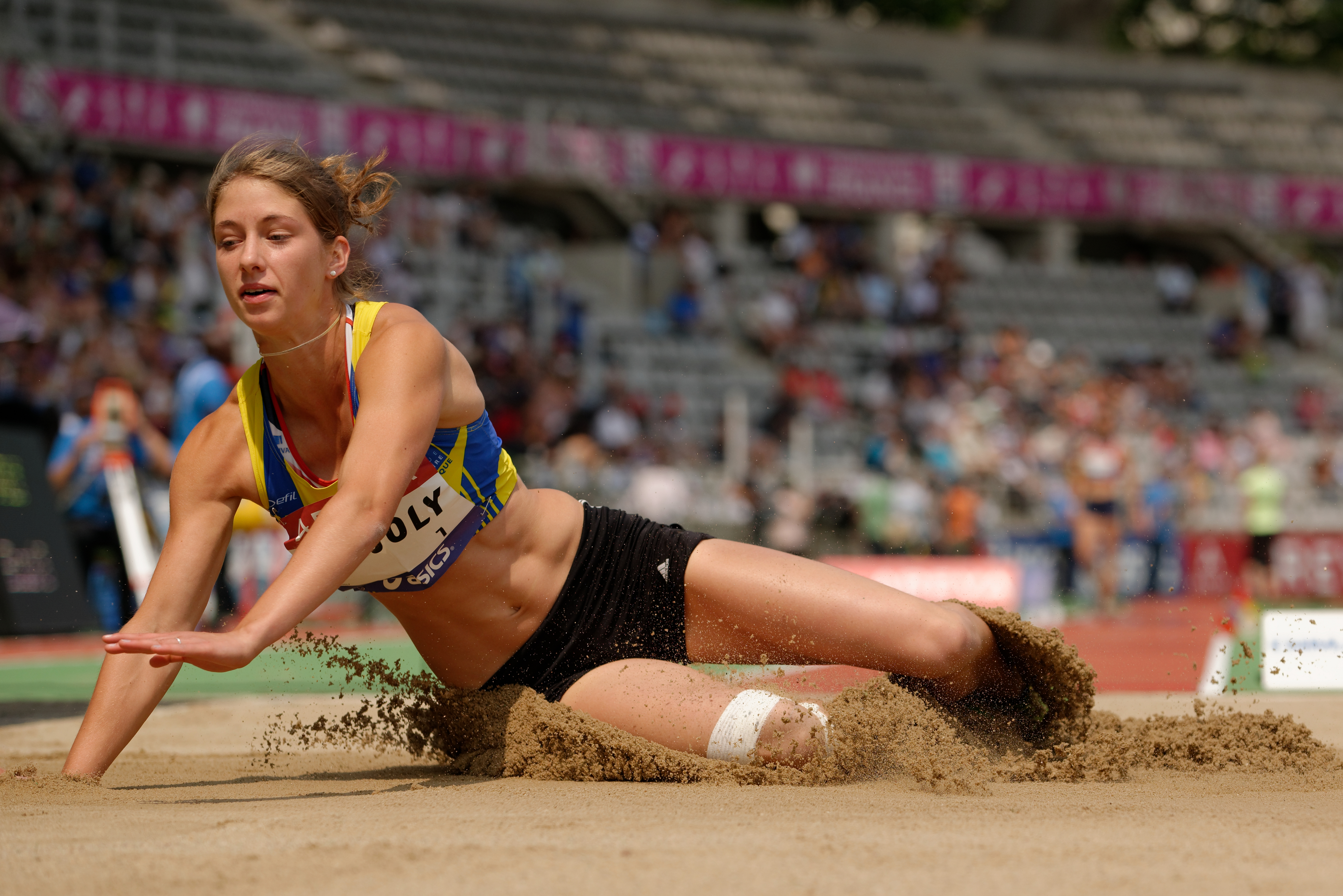
- Le Joly at the Championships of France 2013

Personal information
- Born: 1 March 1992 (age 33) Angers, France
- Height: 174 cm (5 ft 9 in)
- Weight: 58 kg (128 lb)

Sport
- Country: France
- Sport: Athletics
- Event: Combined track and field events
- Club: Entente Angevine Athlétisme

Camille Le Joly (born 1 March 1992 in Angers) is a French athlete who specializes in the combined events.

== Biography ==
She began athletics in 2004 in the SCJB club of Angers. In 2010, she placed 14th in the World Junior Championships, at Moncton, in Canada. A Junior Champion of France in the heptathlon in 2011, she finished 13th at the European Junior Championships in Tallinn.

In early 2013 season, she won the National French Indoor title for the pentathlon at the French Indoors championships, at Aubière, with a personal best of 3,995 pts. In July 2013, she won the national title in the heptathlon at the French championships at Charléty Stadium in Paris, finishing second in the actual competition behind the British Grace Clements.

=== Prize list ===
- French Championships in Athletics :
  - winner of the heptathlon 2013
- French Athletics Indoors Championships:
  - winner of the pentathlon 2013

=== Records ===
Personal Bests
Event	Performance	Location	Date
Heptathlon	5,560 pts	Paris	13 July 2013
Pentathlon (Indoors)	3 995 pts	Aubière	17 February 2013
