= San Marino Athletics Federation =

Sports governing body in the microstate of San Marino

- Federazione Sammarinese di Atletica Leggera
- Sport: Athletics
- Abbreviation: FSAL
- Founded: 1959
- Affiliation: World Athletics
- Regional affiliation: EAA and AASSE
- Headquarters: San Marino
- President: Mauro Santi
- Secretary: Cristina Carattoni

Official website
- www.fsal.sm
- (San Marino)

The San Marino Athletics Federation (Italian: Federazione Sammarinese di Atletica Leggera) is the governing body for the sport of athletics in San Marino.

== Affiliations ==
- World Athletics
- European Athletic Association (EAA)
- San Marino Olympic Committee

== National records ==
FSAL maintains the Sammarinese records in athletics.
