= Russia at the 2010 European Athletics Championships =

Sporting event delegation

Russia was represented by 105 athletes at the 2010 European Athletics Championships held in Barcelona, Spain.

== Participants ==
| Event | Men | Women |
|---|---|---|
| 100 m | Mikhail Idrisov | Anna Gurova; Yuna Mekhti-Zade; Yuliya Katsura |
| 200 m | | Aleksandra Fedoriva; Yuliya Chermoshanskaya; Anastasiya Kapachinskaya |
| 400 m | Vladimir Krasnov; Maksim Dyldin; Pavel Trenikhin | Kseniya Ustalova; Tatyana Firova; Antonina Krivoshapka |
| 800 m | Yuriy Koldin | Mariya Savinova; Tatyana Andrianova; Svetlana Klyuka |
| 1500 m | | Anna Alminova; Natalya Yevdokimova; Oksana Zbrozhek |
| 5000 m | Aleksandr Orlov; Yevgeniy Rybakov | Mariya Konovalova; Yelizaveta Grechishnikova; Olga Golovkina |
| 10,000 m | Pavel Shapovalov | Liliya Shobukhova; Inga Abitova; Yelena Sokolova |
| Marathon | Yuriy Abramov; Oleg Kulkov; Dmitriy Safronov; Aleksey Sokolov | Magrarita Plaksina; Tatyana Pushkaryova; Silviya Skvortsova; Irina Timofeyeva; Nailya Yulamanova; Yevgeniya Danilova |
| 110/100 m hurdles | Yevgeniy Borisov; Konstantin Shabanov | Olga Samylova; Tatyana Dektyaryova |
| 400 m hurdles | Aleksandr Derevyagin; Ildar Minshin | Natalya Antyukh; Yevgeniya Isakova; Natalia Ivanova |
| 3000 m steeplechase | Andrey Farnosov | Yuliya Zarudneva; Lyubov Kharlamova; Lyudmila Kuzmina |
| High Jump | Aleksandr Shustov; Ivan Ukhov; Andrey Silnov; Aleksey Dmitrik | Svetlana Shkolina; Irina Gordeyeva |
| Pole Vault | Dmitiriy Starodubtsev; Leonid Kivalov; Aleksandr Gripich | Svetlana Feofanova; Yuliya Golubchikova |
| Long Jump | Pavel Shalin; Dmitiry Plotnikov | Lyudmila Kolchanova; Tatyana Kotova; Olga Kucherenko |
| Triple Jump | Yevgeniy Plotnir; Lyukman Adams; Ilya Yefremov | Nadezhda Alyokhina; Alsu Murtazina; Natalya Kutyakova |
| Shot Put | | Anna Avdeyeva; Olga Ivanova |
| Discus Throw | Bogdan Pishchalnikov | Natalya Sadova; Svetlana Saykina |
| Hammer Throw | Igor Vinichenko | Tatyana Lysenko |
| Javelin Throw | Sergey Makarov | Mariya Abakumova |
| Decathlon/Heptathlon | Aleksey Drozdov; Vasiliy Kharlamov; Aleksandr Pogorelov | Tatyana Chernova; Yana Panteleyeva; Marina Goncharova |
| 20 km walk | Valeriy Borchin; Andrey Krivov; Stanislav Yemelyanov | Anisya Kirdyapkina; Vera Sokolova; Olga Kaniskina |
| 50 km walk | Sergey Kirdyapkin; Sergey Bakulin; Yuriy Andronov | |
| 4 × 100 m relay | Mikhail Idrisov; Vyacheslav Kolesnichenko; Ivan Teplykh; Anton Olefir; Roman Smirnov | Anna Gurova; Yuna Mekhti-Zade; Yuliya Katsura; Aleksandra Fedoriva; Yuliya Gushchina; Yuliya Chermoshanskaya |
| 4 × 400 m relay | Vladimir Krasnov; Maksim Dyldin; Pavel Trenikhin; Aleksey Aksyonov; Sergey Petukhov; Aleksandr Derevyagin | Kseniya Ustalova; Tatyana Firova; Antonina Krivoshapka; Anastasiya Kapachinskaya; Natalya Nazarova; Kseniya Zadorina |

== Results ==
| 2010 Barcelona | Gold | Silver | Bronze | Total |
| Russia (RUS) | 10 | 4 | 8 | 22 |
