= Czech Republic at the 2010 European Athletics Championships =

Sporting event delegation

Czech Republic will be represented by 40 athletes at the 2010 European Athletics Championships held in Barcelona, Spain, from 27 July to 1 August 2010.

== Participants ==
Event	Men	Women
100 m	Jan Veleba	Kateřina Čechová
200 m	Petr Szetei; Jiří Vojtík	Denisa Rosolová
400 m		Jitka Bartoničková; Denisa Rosolová
800 m	Jakub Holuša	Lenka Masná
3000 m st.		Marcela Lustigová
110 m hurdles	Martin Mazáč; Petr Svoboda	
100 m hurdles		Lucie Škrobáková
400 m hurdles	Josef Prorok; Michal Uhlík	Zuzana Bergrová; Zuzana Hejnová; Kristina Volfová
20 km walk		Lucie Pelantová; Zuzana Schindlerová
High Jump	Jaroslav Bába	
Pole Vault	Michal Balner; Jan Kudlička	Romana Maláčová; Jiřina Ptáčníková
Long Jump	Roman Novotný	
Shot Put	Remigius Machura; Antonín Žalský	Jana Kárníková
Discus Throw	Libor Malina; Jan Marcell	Věra Pospíšilová-Cechlová
Hammer Throw		Lenka Ledvinová; Kateřina Šafránková
Javelin Throw	Petr Frydrych; Jakub Vadlejch; Vítězslav Veselý	Jarmila Klimešová; Barbora Špotáková
Heptathlon		Kateřina Cachová; Eliška Klučinová
4x400 m relay	Jakub Holuša; Josef Prorok; Petr Szetei; Michal Uhlík; Jiří Vojtík	Jitka Bartoničková; Zuzana Bergrová; Zuzana Hejnová; Denisa Rosolová; Jana Slaninová

=== Men ===
==== Track and road events ====
Event	Athletes	Heats		Semifinal		Final	
Event	Athletes	Result	Rank	Result	Rank	Result	Rank
100 m	Jan Veleba	10.68	30	Did not advance			
200 m	Petr Szetei	21.06	21	Did not advance			
200 m	Jiří Vojtík	21.02	20	Did not advance			
800 m	Jakub Holuša	1:47.94	1 Q	1:48.27	8 q	1:47.45	5
110 m hurdles	Martin Mazáč	13.87	20	Did not advance			
110 m hurdles	Petr Svoboda	13.50	3 Q	13.44	2 Q	13.57	6
400 m hurdles	Josef Prorok	49.97(PB)	3 Q	50.13	7 q	49.68(PB)	6
400 m hurdles	Michal Uhlík	50.47	10 q	51.06	13	Did not advance	

==== Field events ====
Event	Athletes	Qualification		Final	
Event	Athletes	Result	Rank	Result	Rank
High Jump	Jaroslav Bába	2.26	5 q	2.26	7
Pole Vault	Michal Balner				
Pole Vault	Jan Kudlička				
Long Jump	Roman Novotný				
Shot put	Remigius Machura				
Shot put	Antonín Žalský				
Discus throw	Libor Malina				
Discus throw	Jan Marcell				
Javelin throw	Petr Frydrych				
Javelin throw	Jakub Vadlejch				
Javelin throw	Vítězslav Veselý				

== Results ==
2010 Barcelona	Gold	Silver	Bronze	Total
Czech Republic (CZE)	0	0	1	1
