= San Marino at the 2010 European Athletics Championships =

Sporting event delegation

San Marino was represented by 2 athletes at the 2010 European Athletics Championships held in Barcelona, Spain.

== Participants ==
Event	Men	Women
100 m		Sara Maroncelli
400 m	Ivano Bucci	

== Results ==
2010 Barcelona	Gold	Silver	Bronze	Total
San Marino (SMR)	0	0	0	0

=== Men ===
Track and road events

Event	Athletes	Heats		Semifinal		Final	
Event	Athletes	Result	Rank	Result	Rank	Result	Rank
400 m	Ivano Bucci	49.03	7				31

=== Women ===
Track and road events

Event	Athletes	Heats		Semifinal		Final	
Event	Athletes	Result	Rank	Result	Rank	Result	Rank
100 m	Sara Maroncelli	12.64	7				30
