= San Marino at the 2018 European Championships =

- WA code: SMR

in (United Kingdom) Glasgow (Germany) Berlin 2 August 2018 – 12 August 2018
- Competitors: 8 (4 men and 4 women) in 2 sports
- Medals: Gold 0 Silver 0 Bronze 0 Total 0

European Championships appearances
- 2018; 2022

San Marino competed at the inaugural 7 sports 2018 European Championships which were held in Berlin, Germany and Glasgow, United Kingdom from 2 to 12 August 2018. It competed in 2 sports.

== Aquatics ==
=== Swimming ===
A total of 6 swimmers (2 men and 4 women) represented San Marino in the swimming events.

Men

Athlete	Event	Heat		Semifinal		Final	
Athlete	Event	Time	Rank	Time	Rank	Time	Rank
Gianluca Pasolini	50 m freestyle	25.69	64	did not advance			
Gianluca Pasolini	100 m freestyle	54.51	78	did not advance			
Gianluca Pasolini	200 m freestyle	1:59.36	59	did not advance			
Cristian Santi	50 m freestyle	25.64	63	did not advance			
Cristian Santi	100 m freestyle	54.60	79	did not advance			
Cristian Santi	200 m freestyle	1:59.05	57	did not advance			

Women

Athlete	Event	Heat		Semifinal		Final	
Athlete	Event	Time	Rank	Time	Rank	Time	Rank
Elisa Bernardi	50 m freestyle	28.01	54	did not advance			
Elisa Bernardi	100 m freestyle	1:00.49	49	did not advance			
Elisa Bernardi	200 m freestyle	2:10.82	52	did not advance			
Beatrice Felici	50 m freestyle	27.81	52	did not advance			
Beatrice Felici	50 m butterfly	28.27	37	did not advance			
Beatrice Felici	100 m butterfly	1:07.42	37	did not advance			
Beatrice Felici	200 m butterfly	2:27.90	24	did not advance			
Sara Lettoli	50 m freestyle	27.86	53	did not advance			
Sara Lettoli	100 m freestyle	1:00.01	48	did not advance			
Sara Lettoli	200 m freestyle	2:08.12	51	did not advance			
Arianna Valloni	400 m freestyle	4:25.57	27	—		did not advance	
Arianna Valloni	800 m freestyle	8:57.11	16	—		did not advance	
Arianna Valloni	1500 m freestyle	16:59.16	13	—		did not advance	
Elisa Bernardi; Beatrice Felici; Sara Lettoli; Arianna Valloni	4 × 200 metre freestyle relay	8:51.45	12	—		did not advance	

Mixed events

Athlete	Event	Heat		Final	
Athlete	Event	Time	Rank	Time	Rank
Elisa Bernardi; Gianluca Pasolini; Cristian Santi; Arianna Valloni	4 × 200 metre freestyle relay	8:21.31	9	did not advance	

== Athletics ==
A total of 2 athletes (all men) represented San Marino in the athletics events.

Men
Track and road

Athlete	Event	Qualifying Round		Semifinal		Final	
Athlete	Event	Result	Rank	Result	Rank	Result	Rank
Andrea Ercolani Volta	400 m hurdles	53.86	25	did not advance			

Field events

Athlete	Event	Qualification		Final	
Athlete	Event	Distance	Position	Distance	Position
Eugenio Rossi	High jump	No mark		did not advance	
