= 2008 World Junior Championships in Athletics – Women's 400 metres hurdles =

The women's 400 metres hurdles event at the 2008 World Junior Championships in Athletics was held in Bydgoszcz, Poland, at Zawisza Stadium on 9, 10 and 11 July.

== Medalists ==
Gold	Takecia Jameson; United States
Silver	Janeil Bellille; Trinidad and Tobago
Bronze	Meghan Beesley; United Kingdom

== Results ==
=== Final ===
11 July

Rank	Name	Nationality	Time	Notes
1st place, gold medalist(s)	Takecia Jameson	United States	56.29	
2nd place, silver medalist(s)	Janeil Bellille	Trinidad and Tobago	56.84	
3rd place, bronze medalist(s)	Meghan Beesley	United Kingdom	57.08	
4	Hanna Titimets	Ukraine	57.22	
5	Laura Hansen	Germany	57.46	
6	Hanna Yaroshchuk	Ukraine	58.43	
7	Frida Persson	Sweden	58.62	
8	Nikita Tracey	Jamaica	59.05	

=== Semifinals ===
10 July

==== Semifinal 1 ====
Rank	Name	Nationality	Time	Notes
1	Meghan Beesley	United Kingdom	57.24	Q
2	Janeil Bellille	Trinidad and Tobago	57.54	Q
3	Nikita Tracey	Jamaica	57.84	Q
4	Hanna Yaroshchuk	Ukraine	58.00	q
5	Andreea Ionescu	Romania	58.21	
6	Fayza Omer Jomaa	Sudan	58.22	
7	Benedikte Hauge	Norway	59.16	
8	Christiane Klopsch	Germany	60.39	

==== Semifinal 2 ====
Rank	Name	Nationality	Time	Notes
1	Takecia Jameson	United States	57.31	Q
2	Laura Hansen	Germany	57.73	Q
3	Hanna Titimets	Ukraine	57.86	Q
4	Frida Persson	Sweden	58.04	q
5	Sarah Wells	Canada	58.58	
6	Monika Kopycka	Poland	59.34	
7	Brittney McGlone	Australia	60.05	
	Shana-Gaye Tracey	Jamaica	DNF	

=== Heats ===
9 July

==== Heat 1 ====
Rank	Name	Nationality	Time	Notes
1	Andreea Ionescu	Romania	59.05	Q
2	Fayza Omer Jomaa	Sudan	59.51	Q
3	Meghan Beesley	United Kingdom	59.83	Q
4	Kalyn Sheehan	Ireland	59.88	
5	Emilia Granqvist	Sweden	60.59	
6	Taissa Makhmayeva	Kazakhstan	62.16	

==== Heat 2 ====
Rank	Name	Nationality	Time	Notes
1	Sarah Wells	Canada	58.89	Q
2	Shana-Gaye Tracey	Jamaica	58.95	Q
3	Hanna Titimets	Ukraine	59.16	Q
4	Monika Kopycka	Poland	59.41	q
5	Amélie Fosse	France	59.97	
6	Emma Millard	Finland	60.13	
7	Kori Carter	United States	61.20	
8	Mila Andrić	Serbia	61.40	

==== Heat 3 ====
Rank	Name	Nationality	Time	Notes
1	Frida Persson	Sweden	58.81	Q
2	Takecia Jameson	United States	59.16	Q
3	Laura Hansen	Germany	59.20	Q
4	Olesya Tsaranok	Russia	59.97	
5	Jessie Barr	Ireland	60.00	
6	Latoya Griffith	Barbados	60.61	
7	Evelin Farsang	Hungary	61.57	

==== Heat 4 ====
Rank	Name	Nationality	Time	Notes
1	Nikita Tracey	Jamaica	57.58	Q
2	Janeil Bellille	Trinidad and Tobago	58.40	Q
3	Hanna Yaroshchuk	Ukraine	58.58	Q
4	Benedikte Hauge	Norway	58.89	q
5	Brittney McGlone	Australia	59.39	q
6	Christiane Klopsch	Germany	59.50	q
7	Gorana Cvijetic	Bosnia and Herzegovina	60.67	
8	Elif Yıldırım	Turkey	61.06	

== Participation ==
According to an unofficial count, 29 athletes from 23 countries participated in the event.

- Australia (1)
- Barbados (1)
- Bosnia and Herzegovina (1)
- Canada (1)
- Finland (1)
- France (1)
- Germany (2)
- Hungary (1)
- Ireland (2)
- Jamaica (2)
- Kazakhstan (1)
- Norway (1)
- Poland (1)
- Romania (1)
- Russia (1)
- Serbia (1)
- Sudan (1)
- Sweden (2)
- Trinidad and Tobago (1)
- Turkey (1)
- Ukraine (2)
- United Kingdom (1)
- United States (2)
