= Athletics at the 2011 Summer Universiade – Women's 400 metres hurdles =

The women's 400 metres hurdles event at the 2011 Summer Universiade was held on 16–18 August.

== Medalists ==
Gold	Silver	Bronze
Hanna Yaroshchuk; Ukraine	Irina Davydova; Russia	Nagihan Karadere; Turkey

== Results ==
=== Heats ===
Qualification: First 2 of each heat (Q) and the next 2 fastest (q) qualified for the final.

Rank	Heat	Name	Nationality	Time	Notes
1	3	Nagihan Karadere	Turkey	56.48	Q
2	3	Tina Polak	Poland	56.71	Q
3	1	Hanna Yaroshchuk	Ukraine	56.72	Q
4	2	Anastasiya Ott	Russia	56.76	Q
5	3	Irina Davydova	Russia	56.83	q
6	1	Wenda Theron	South Africa	56.89	Q
7	2	Meghan Beesley	Great Britain	56.95	Q
8	2	Sara Petersen	Denmark	57.02	q
9	2	Hanna Titimets	Ukraine	57.20	
10	3	Jessie Barr	Ireland	57.21	
11	1	Sema Apak	Turkey	57.53	
12	1	Mame Fatou Faye	Senegal	57.56	SB
13	2	Ruan Zhuofen	China	57.81	SB
14	1	Yang Qi	China	57.91	
15	3	Zuzana Bergrová	Czech Republic	58.16	
16	2	Justine Kinney	Ireland	58.70	
17	3	Christiane Klopsch	Germany	58.84	
18	2	Axelle Dauwens	Belgium	59.61	
19	1	Valentine Arrieta	Switzerland	1:00.50	
20	3	Mila Andrić	Serbia	1:00.69	
21	2	Alexandra Kuzina	Kazakhstan	1:01.05	
22	3	Inese Nagle	Latvia	1:03.10	
23	1	Teele Palumaa	Estonia	1:05.01	
	1	Ti'erra Brown	United States	DNS	

=== Final ===
Official Video

Rank	Lane	Name	Nationality	Time	Notes
1st place, gold medalist(s)	5	Hanna Yaroshchuk	Ukraine	55.15	
2nd place, silver medalist(s)	2	Irina Davydova	Russia	55.50	
3rd place, bronze medalist(s)	4	Nagihan Karadere	Turkey	55.81	
4	1	Sara Petersen	Denmark	56.54	SB
5	7	Wenda Theron	South Africa	56.76	
6	6	Anastasiya Ott	Russia	56.79	
7	3	Tina Polak	Poland	57.02	
8	8	Meghan Beesley	Great Britain	59.21	
