= 2011 European Athletics U23 Championships – Women's 400 metres hurdles =

The Women's 400 metres hurdles event at the 2011 European Athletics U23 Championships was held in Ostrava, Czech Republic, at Městský stadion on 14 and 16 July.

== Medalists ==
Gold	Anna Yaroshchuk; Ukraine
Silver	Hanna Titimets; Ukraine
Bronze	Meghan Beesley; United Kingdom

== Results ==
=== Final ===
16 July 2011 / 16:00

Rank	Name	Nationality	Lane	Reaction Time	Time	Notes
1st place, gold medalist(s)	Anna Yaroshchuk	Ukraine	5	0.213	54.77	PB
2nd place, silver medalist(s)	Hanna Titimets	Ukraine	6	0.231	54.91	
3rd place, bronze medalist(s)	Meghan Beesley	United Kingdom	3	0.177	55.69	PB
4	Vera Barbosa	Portugal	4	0.277	55.81	NR
5	Jessie Barr	Ireland	8	0.285	56.62	PB
6	Christiane Klopsch	Germany	7	0.218	57.05	SB
7	Valentine Arrieta	Switzerland	2	0.186	57.43	
8	Marzena Kościelniak	Poland	1	0.209	57.99	SB

=== Heats ===
Qualified: First 2 in each heat (Q) and 2 best performers (q) advance to the Final

==== Summary ====
Rank	Name	Nationality	Time	Notes
1	Hanna Titimets	Ukraine	56.22	Q
2	Vera Barbosa	Portugal	56.70	Q PB
3	Marzena Kościelniak	Poland	57.20	q SB
4	Meghan Beesley	United Kingdom	57.38	Q
5	Anna Yaroshchuk	Ukraine	57.74	Q
6	Valentine Arrieta	Switzerland	57.95	q
7	Jessie Barr	Ireland	58.01	Q
8	Valeriya Znamenskaya	Russia	58.40	
9	Mila Andrić	Serbia	58.65	SB
10	Anna Raukuc	Germany	58.66	
11	Christiane Klopsch	Germany	58.72	Q
12	Andreea Ionescu	Romania	59.51	
13	Raffaela Dorfer	Austria	1:00.15	
14	Karen Jean-François	France	1:00.71	
15	Anniina Laitinen	Finland	1:00.98	
16	Joanna Linkiewicz	Poland	1:01.24	
17	Līga Velvere	Latvia	1:01.45	
18	Kalyn Sheehan	Ireland	1:03.46	

==== Details ====
===== Heat 1 =====
14 July 2011 / 11:30

Rank	Name	Nationality	Lane	Reaction Time	Time	Notes
1	Hanna Titimets	Ukraine	4	0.281	56.22	Q
2	Vera Barbosa	Portugal	5	0.325	56.70	Q PB
3	Marzena Kościelniak	Poland	3	0.234	57.20	q SB
4	Valentine Arrieta	Switzerland	6	0.168	57.95	q
5	Mila Andrić	Serbia	2	0.202	58.65	SB
6	Raffaela Dorfer	Austria	7	0.219	1:00.15	

===== Heat 2 =====
14 July 2011 / 11:37

Rank	Name	Nationality	Lane	Reaction Time	Time	Notes
1	Meghan Beesley	United Kingdom	6	0.201	57.38	Q
2	Jessie Barr	Ireland	5	0.265	58.01	Q
3	Valeriya Znamenskaya	Russia	4	0.325	58.40	
4	Anna Raukuc	Germany	3	0.184	58.66	
5	Andreea Ionescu	Romania	7	0.251	59.51	
6	Karen Jean-François	France	2	0.208	1:00.71	

===== Heat 3 =====
14 July 2011 / 11:44

Rank	Name	Nationality	Lane	Reaction Time	Time	Notes
1	Anna Yaroshchuk	Ukraine	3	0.221	57.74	Q
2	Christiane Klopsch	Germany	6	0.236	58.72	Q
3	Anniina Laitinen	Finland	2	0.256	1:00.98	
4	Joanna Linkiewicz	Poland	4	0.204	1:01.24	
5	Līga Velvere	Latvia	5	0.198	1:01.45	
6	Kalyn Sheehan	Ireland	7	0.236	1:03.46	

== Participation ==
According to an unofficial count, 18 athletes from 14 countries participated in the event.

- Austria (1)
- Finland (1)
- France (1)
- Germany (2)
- Ireland (2)
- Latvia (1)
- Poland (2)
- Portugal (1)
- Romania (1)
- Russia (1)
- Serbia (1)
- Switzerland (1)
- Ukraine (2)
- United Kingdom (1)
