= Anna Ryzhykova =

Ukrainian hurdler (born 1989)

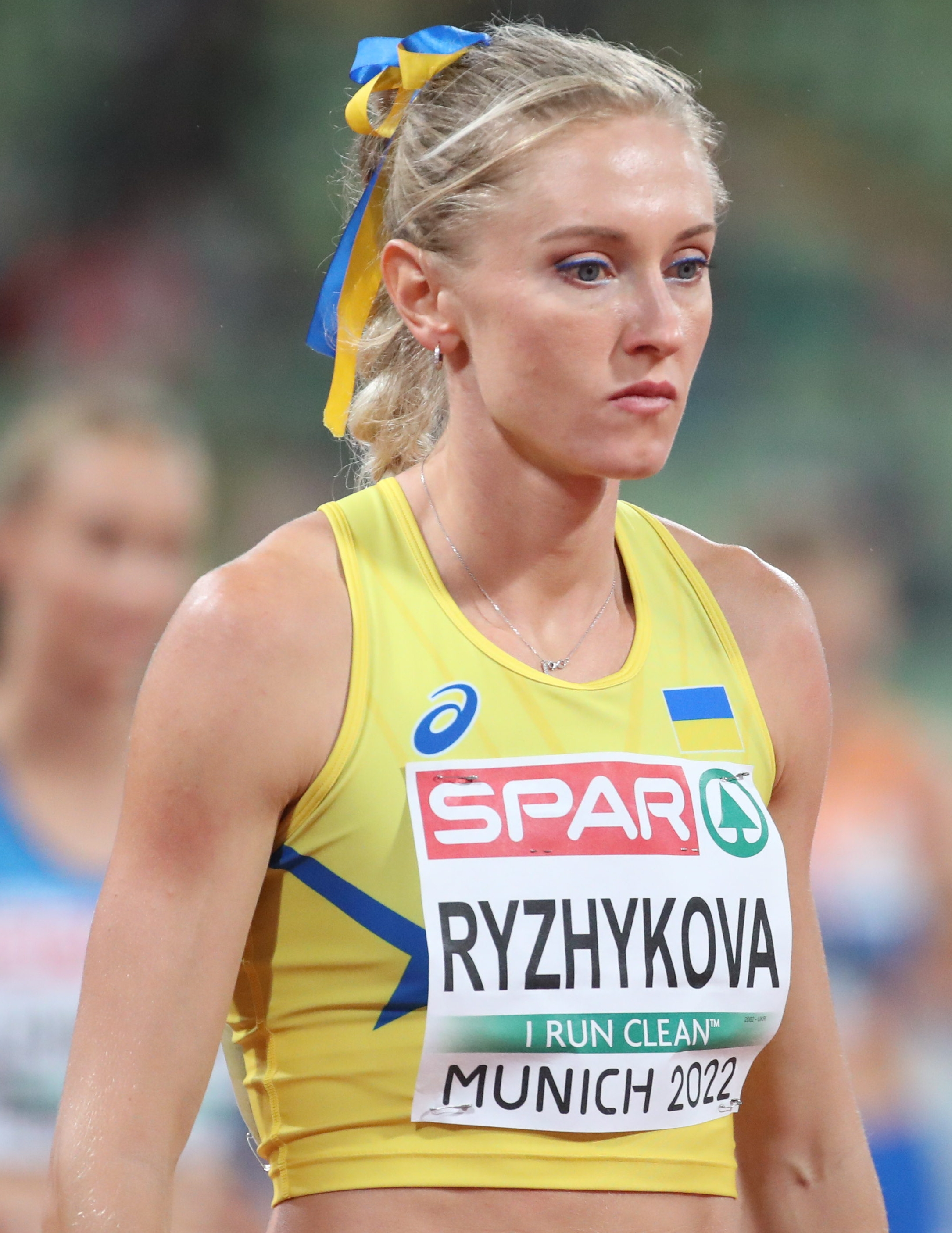
- Ryzhykova in 2022

Personal information
- Born: November 24, 1989 (age 36) Dnipropetrovsk, Ukrainian SSR, Soviet Union
- Height: 1.76 m (5 ft 9 in)
- Weight: 57 kg (126 lb)

Sport
- Country: Ukraine
- Sport: Athletics
- Events: 400 m hurdles 4×400 m relay

Achievements and titles
- Personal bests: 400 m hurdles: 52.96 NR (Stockholm 2021); 400 m: 51.21 (Lutsk 2021)
Medal record
Women's athletics
Representing Ukraine
Olympic Games
Bronze medal – third place	2012 London	4×400 m relay
European Championships
Silver medal – second place	2012 Helsinki	400 m hurdles
Silver medal – second place	2014 Zürich	4x400 m relay
Silver medal – second place	2018 Berlin	400 m hurdles
Bronze medal – third place	2022 Munich	400 m hurdles
European Team Championships
Gold medal – first place	2014 Braunschweig	400 m hurdles
Gold medal – first place	2014 Braunschweig	4x400 m relay
Silver medal – second place	2013 Gateshead	400 m hurdles
Military World Games
Silver medal – second place	2015 Mungyeong	400 m hurdles
Silver medal – second place	2015 Mungyeong	4×400 m relay
Silver medal – second place	2019 Wuhan	400 m hurdles
Bronze medal – third place	2019 Wuhan	4×400 m relay
European U23 Championships
Gold medal – first place	2011 Ostrava	400 m hurdles
Silver medal – second place	2011 Ostrava	4×400 m relay
World Junior Championships
Silver medal – second place	2008 Bydgoszcz	4×400 m relay
European Junior Championships
Silver medal – second place	2007 Hengelo	4×100 m relay
Universiade
Gold medal – first place	2011 Shenzhen	400 m hurdles
Silver medal – second place	2013 Kazan	400 m hurdles
Representing Europe
IAAF Continental Cup
Bronze medal – third place	2018 Ostrava	400 m hurdles

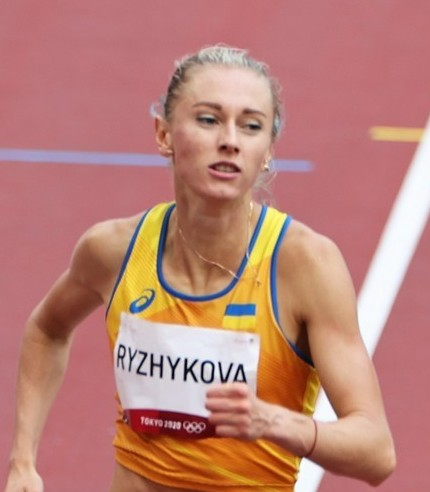
Anna Ryzhykova at the 2020 Tokyo Olympics

Anna Vasylivna Ryzhykova, née Yaroshchuk (Ukrainian: Анна Василівна Рижикова (Ярощук); born 24 November 1989) is a Ukrainian track and field athlete who specialises in the 400 metres hurdles. At the European Athletics Championships, she won silver medals in 2012 and 2018, and bronze in 2022. Ryzhykova placed fifth at the 2020 Tokyo Olympics.

She won gold medals at the 2011 Summer Universiade and European U23 Championships. Ryzhykova is the Ukrainian record holder in her specialist event with a time of 52.96 seconds.

== Career ==
Anna Yaroshchuk began her career in the sprinting events and represented Ukraine in the 200 metres at the Gymnasiade in 2006. In 2007, she ran a personal best of 24.58 seconds for the event and in a team with Hanna Titimets, Nataliya Pohrebnyak and Yelizaveta Bryzhina she set a national junior record in the 4×100 metres relay to take the silver medal at the 2007 European Athletics Junior Championships. She switched to the 400 m hurdles a year later and the move proved beneficial, as she won the national junior title and placed sixth in the event at the 2008 World Junior Championships in Athletics. She also helped the Ukrainian 4×400 metres relay team to win the silver medal behind the United States in national junior record time.

She was eighth in the hurdles at the 2009 European Athletics U23 Championships and Ukraine came fourth in the relay. Yaroshchuk won her first senior national title in the hurdles that year and improved her personal best time to 57.23 seconds. Further personal bests came at the 2010 Ukrainian championships, as she was runner-up in the 200 m and 400 m hurdles with times of 23.49 seconds and 55.60 seconds respectively. She gained selection for the 2010 European Athletics Championships, but was eliminated in the semi-final of the competition.

Yaroshchuk ran a personal best of 54.77 seconds to win the hurdles gold at the 2011 European Athletics U23 Championships ahead of compatriot Hanna Titimets and the two later combined their efforts to claim the silver in the 4 × 400 m relay behind Russia. She won her second 400 m hurdles gold of the season at the Summer Universiade.

She placed third at the 2012 European Championships, clocking 54.35 seconds. The 2012 London Olympics were unsuccessful for her, as she went out of the hurdles event in the second semi-final in 55.51, but won a bronze medal as part of women's 4 × 400 m relay after the Russian team was disqualified for the second time in 2017.

In 2018, Ryzhykova took a silver medal in her specialist event at the European Championships with a time of 54.51 seconds, behind only Switzerland's Léa Sprunger who ran 54.33. Meghan Beesley of Great Britain in third was almost one second slower.

She placed seventh at the 2019 World Championships in a time of 54.45 seconds (equal with a mark of USA's Ashley Spencer in sixth).

She then improved her position at the 2020 Tokyo Olympics by placing fifth in the final with a 53.48 seconds performance. Her compatriot Viktoriya Tkachuk came sixth in 53.79.

== Competition record ==
Representing Ukraine
Year	Competition	Venue	Position	Event	Result
2007	European Junior Championships	Hengelo, Netherlands	2nd	4 × 100 m relay	44.77
2008	World Junior Championships	Bydgoszcz, Poland	6th	400 m hurdles	58.43
2008	World Junior Championships	Bydgoszcz, Poland	2nd	4 × 400 m relay	3:34.20
2009	European U23 Championships	Kaunas, Lithuania	8th	400 m hurdles	57.26
2009	European U23 Championships	Kaunas, Lithuania	4th	4 × 400 m relay	3:30.78
2010	European Championships	Barcelona, Spain	11th (h)	400 m hurdles	56.29
2011	European U23 Championships	Ostrava, Czech Republic	1st	400 m hurdles	54.77 PB
2011	European U23 Championships	Ostrava, Czech Republic	2nd	4 × 400 m relay	3:30.13
2011	Universiade	Shenzhen, China	1st	400 m hurdles	55.15
2011	World Championships	Daegu, South Korea	10th (sf)	400 m hurdles	55.09
2011	World Championships	Daegu, South Korea	–	4 × 400 m relay	DQ
2012	European Championships	Helsinki, Finland	2nd	400 m hurdles	54.35 PB
2012	Olympic Games	London, United Kingdom	12th (sf)	400 m hurdles	55.51
2012	Olympic Games	London, United Kingdom	3rd	4 × 400 m relay	3:23.57
2013	European Team Championships	Gateshead, Great Britain	2nd	400 m hurdles	55.27
2013	Universiade	Kazan, Russia	2nd	400 m hurdles	54.77
2013	World Championships	Moscow, Russia	6th	400 m hurdles	55.01
2014	European Team Championships	Braunschweig, Germany	1st	400 m hurdles	55.00
2014	European Team Championships	Braunschweig, Germany	1st	4 × 400 m relay	3:27.66
2014	European Championships	Zürich, Switzerland	–	400 m hurdles	DQ
2014	European Championships	Zürich, Switzerland	2nd	4 × 400 m relay	3:24.32
2015	World Championships	Beijing, China	9th (sf)	400 m hurdles	55.16
2015	Military World Games	Mungyeong, South Korea	–	100 m hurdles	DNF
2015	Military World Games	Mungyeong, South Korea	2nd	400 m hurdles	55.74
2015	Military World Games	Mungyeong, South Korea	2nd	4 × 400 m relay	3:30.66
2018	World Indoor Championships	Birmingham, United Kingdom	8th (sf)	400 m	52.74
2018	World Indoor Championships	Birmingham, United Kingdom	4th	4 × 400 m relay	3:31.32
2018	European Championships	Berlin, Germany	2nd	400 m hurdles	54.51
2019	European Indoor Championships	Glasgow, United Kingdom	9th (sf)	400 m	53.22
2019	World Relays	Yokohama, Japan	–	4 × 400 m relay	DQ
2019	World Championships	Doha, Qatar	7th	400 m hurdles	54.45
2019	World Championships	Doha, Qatar	6th	4 × 400 m relay	3:27.48
2021	European Indoor Championships	Toruń, Poland	5th (sf)	400 m	52.11
2021	European Indoor Championships	Toruń, Poland	5th	4 × 400 m relay	3:30.38
2021	Olympic Games	Tokyo, Japan	5th	400 m hurdles	53.48
2021	Olympic Games	Tokyo, Japan	9th (h)	4 × 400 m relay	3:24.50
2022	World Championships	Eugene, United States	8th	400 m hurdles	54.93
2022	World Championships	Eugene, United States	9th (h)	4 × 400 m relay	3:29.25
2022	European Championships	Munich, Germany	3rd	400 m hurdles	54.86
2023	World Championships	Budapest, Hungary	10th (sf)	400 m hurdles	54.42
2024	European Championships	Rome, Italy	12th (sf)	400 m hurdles	54.95
2024	European Championships	Rome, Italy	12th (h)	4 × 400 m relay	3:27.69
2024	Olympic Games	Paris, France	23rd (sf)	400 m hurdles	55.65
