= 2008 World Junior Championships in Athletics – Women's 4 × 400 metres relay =

The women's 4 × 400 metres relay event at the 2008 World Junior Championships in Athletics was held in Bydgoszcz, Poland, at Zawisza Stadium on 12 and 13 July.

== Medalists ==
Gold	Lanie Whittaker; Jessica Beard; Erica Alexander; Takecia Jameson; United States
Silver	Olha Zemlyak; Yuliya Krasnoshchok; Hanna Yaroshchuk; Yuliya Baraley; Ukraine
Bronze	Brittney McGlone; Trychelle Kingdom; Olivia Tauro; Angeline Blackburn; Australia

== Results ==
=== Final ===
13 July

Rank	Nation	Competitors	Time	Notes
1st place, gold medalist(s)	United States	Lanie Whittaker; Jessica Beard; Erica Alexander; Takecia Jameson	3:30.19	
2nd place, silver medalist(s)	Ukraine	Olha Zemlyak; Yuliya Krasnoshchok; Hanna Yaroshchuk; Yuliya Baraley	3:34.20	
3rd place, bronze medalist(s)	Australia	Brittney McGlone; Trychelle Kingdom; Olivia Tauro; Angeline Blackburn	3:34.23	
4	France	Amélie Fosse; Berenice Manimba; Margot Viot; Floria Gueï	3:35.83	
5	Russia	Liliya Gafiyatullina; Kseniya Prytkova; Olesya Tsaranok; Aleksandra Bulanova	3:37.40	
6	Belarus	Maryna Liboza; Viktoryia Shauchuk; Viktoryia Manko; Katsiaryna Mishyna	3:38.38	
7	Germany	Vera Stelkens; Julia Müller-Foell; Inga Müller; Fabienne Kohlmann	3:39.00	
8	Canada	Alyssa Johnson; Jessica Parry; Sarah Wells; Natalie Geiger	3:39.27	

=== Heats ===
12 July

==== Heat 1 ====
Rank	Nation	Competitors	Time	Notes
1	United States	Lanie Whittaker; Jessica Beard; Erica Alexander; Porche Byrd	3:29.54	Q
2	Australia	Brittney McGlone; Trychelle Kingdom; Olivia Tauro; Angeline Blackburn	3:35.22	Q
3	Russia	Yuliya Terekhova; Kseniya Prytkova; Aleksandra Bulanova; Liliya Gafiyatullina	3:36.61	Q
4	Canada	Alyssa Johnson; Jessica Parry; Sarah Wells; Natalie Geiger	3:37.84	q
5	Poland	Kamila Nowak; Joanna Linkiewicz; Ewa Jacniak; Anna Pacholska	3:43.08	
6	Kazakhstan	Natalya Tukova; Yelena Geptina; Margarita Kudinova; Taissa Makhmayeva	3:43.70	
7	India	Juana Murmu; Bindu Simon Rajam; Tintu Luka; Machettira Poovamma	3:44.13	
8	Serbia	Angela Terek; Jelena Andjelkovic; Mila Andrić; Marijela Markovic	3:46.64	

==== Heat 2 ====
Rank	Nation	Competitors	Time	Notes
1	Ukraine	Yuliya Shpihernyuk; Olha Zemlyak; Yuliya Krasnoshchok; Yuliya Baraley	3:37.12	Q
2	Germany	Vera Stelkens; Julia Müller-Foell; Inga Müller; Fabienne Kohlmann	3:37.20	Q
3	Belarus	Maryna Liboza; Viktoryia Shauchuk; Viktoryia Manko; Katsiaryna Mishyna	3:37.45	Q
4	France	Amélie Fosse; Berenice Manimba; Floria Gueï; Margot Viot	3:37.54	q
5	Jamaica	Kayan Robinson; Latoya McDermott; Amoy Blake; Natoya Goule	3:38.00	
6	Trinidad and Tobago	Nyoka Giles; Janeil Bellille; Kai Selvon; Britney St. Louis	3:38.14	
7	Romania	Andreea Ogrăzeanu; Mihaela Nunu; Andreea Ionescu; Elena Mirela Lavric	3:41.39	

== Participation ==
According to an unofficial count, 63 athletes from 15 countries participated in the event.

- Australia (4)
- Belarus (4)
- Canada (4)
- France (4)
- Germany (4)
- India (4)
- Jamaica (4)
- Kazakhstan (4)
- Poland (4)
- Romania (4)
- Russia (5)
- Serbia (4)
- Trinidad and Tobago (4)
- Ukraine (5)
- United States (5)
