= 2011 European Athletics U23 Championships – Women's 4 × 400 metres relay =

The Women's 4 × 400 metres relay event at the 2011 European Athletics U23 Championships was held in Ostrava, Czech Republic, at Městský stadion on 17 July.

== Medalists ==
Gold	Yevgeniya Subbotina; Yekaterina Yefimova; Yuliya Terekhova; Olga Topilskaya; Russia
Silver	Kateryna Plyashechuk; Alina Lohvynenko; Anna Yaroshchuk; Yuliya Olishevska; Ukraine
Bronze	Clémence Sorgnard; Marie Gayot; Elea-Mariama Diarra; Floria Gueï; France

== Results ==
=== Final ===
17 July 2011 / 18:40

Rank	Name	Nationality	Lane	Reaction Time	Time	Notes
1st place, gold medalist(s)	Russia	Yevgeniya Subbotina; Yekaterina Yefimova; Yuliya Terekhova; Olga Topilskaya	4	0.202	3:27.72	
2nd place, silver medalist(s)	Ukraine	Kateryna Plyashechuk; Alina Lohvynenko; Anna Yaroshchuk; Yuliya Olishevska	3	0.302	3:30.13	
3rd place, bronze medalist(s)	France	Clémence Sorgnard; Marie Gayot; Elea-Mariama Diarra; Floria Gueï	8	0.187	3:31.73	
4	Poland	Kinga Sadłowska; Iga Baumgart; Marzena Kościelniak; Joanna Linkiewicz	2	0.276	3:36.42	
5	Romania	Paula Băduleţ; Mihaela Nunu; Andreea Ionescu; Mirela Lavric	6	0.286	3:36.76	
6	Portugal	Dorothé Évora; Vera Barbosa; Joceline Monteiro; Cátia Nunes	5	0.264	3:37.28	
7	Norway	Benedicte Hauge; Tara Marie Norum; Martine Eikemo Borge; Julie Bertheussen Falkanger	7	0.190	3:40.10	

== Participation ==
According to an unofficial count, 28 athletes from 7 countries participated in the event.

- France (4)
- Norway (4)
- Poland (4)
- Portugal (4)
- Romania (4)
- Russia (4)
- Ukraine (4)
