= Athletics at the 2013 Summer Universiade – Women's 400 metres hurdles =

The women's 400 metres hurdles event at the 2013 Summer Universiade was held on 8–9 July.

== Medalists ==
Gold	Silver	Bronze
Hanna Titimets; Ukraine	Hanna Yaroshchuk; Ukraine	Irina Davydova; Russia

== Results ==
=== Heats ===
Qualification: First 2 in each heat and 2 best performers advance to the Finals.

Rank	Heat	Name	Nationality	Time	Notes
1	1	Hanna Titimets	Ukraine	55.38	Q
2	1	Sarah Wells	Canada	55.66	Q, PB
3	1	Landria Buckley	United States	56.15	q, PB
4	3	Irina Davydova	Russia	56.41	Q
5	3	Anneri Ebersohn	South Africa	56.97	Q
6	3	Christiane Klopsch	Germany	57.36	q
7	2	Hanna Yaroshchuk	Ukraine	57.52	Q
8	3	Axelle Dauwens	Belgium	57.53	
9	1	Stine Tomb	Norway	57.85	
10	2	Jessie Barr	Ireland	57.91	Q
11	2	Noelle Montcalm	Canada	58.04	
12	1	Mame Fatou Faye	Senegal	58.90	
13	2	Eglė Staišiūnaitė	Lithuania	59.99	
14	2	Joanna Linkiewicz	Poland	1:00.01	
15	1	Javiera Errázuriz	Chile	1:00.24	
16	3	Alexandra Romanova	Kazakhstan	1:00.27	
17	3	Özge Akın	Turkey	1:01.67	
18	2	Derya Yildirim	Turkey	1:02.31	
19	1	Anu Raghavan	India	1:02.74	
20	2	Annika Sakkarias	Estonia	1:03.42	PB
21	2	Oarabile Babolayi	Botswana	1:06.05	
22	3	Ramata Nikiema	Burkina Faso	1:07.64	
	3	Inese Nagle	Latvia	DNS	

=== Final ===
Rank	Name	Nationality	Time	Notes
1st place, gold medalist(s)	Hanna Titimets	Ukraine	54.64	PB
2nd place, silver medalist(s)	Hanna Yaroshchuk	Ukraine	54.77	SB
3rd place, bronze medalist(s)	Irina Davydova	Russia	54.79	SB
4	Sarah Wells	Canada	55.76	
5	Anneri Ebersohn	South Africa	57.58	
6	Jessie Barr	Ireland	57.65	
7	Christiane Klopsch	Germany	57.93	
	Landria Buckley	United States	DNF	
