= Track and field at the 2015 Military World Games – Women's 400 metres hurdles =

The women's 100 metres hurdles event at the 2015 Military World Games was held on 6 October at the KAFAC Sports Complex.

== Records ==
Prior to this competition, the existing world and CISM record were as follows:

| World Record | Yuliya Pechonkina (RUS) | 52.34 | Tula, Russia | 8 August 2003 |
| CISM World Record | Vania Stambolova (BUL) | 55.30 | Sofia, Bulgaria | 9 June 2009 |

== Schedule ==
| Date | Time | Round |
|---|---|---|
| 6 October 2015 | 15:00 | Final |

== Medalists ==
| Gold | Silver | Bronze |
|---|---|---|
| Oluwakemi Adekoya; Bahrain | Hanna Ryzhykova; Ukraine | Vania Stambolova; Bulgaria |

== Results ==
=== Final ===
| Rank | Lane | Name | Nationality | Time | Notes |
|---|---|---|---|---|---|
| 1st place, gold medalist(s) | 4 | Oluwakemi Adekoya | Bahrain | 55.30 | =CR |
| 2nd place, silver medalist(s) | 5 | Hanna Ryzhykova | Ukraine | 55.74 | |
| 3rd place, bronze medalist(s) | 3 | Vania Stambolova | Bulgaria | 57.45 | |
| 4 | 8 | Aminat Oluwaseun Yusuf Jamal | Bahrain | 58.20 | |
| 5 | 6 | Hanna Titimets | Ukraine | 59.29 | |
| 6 | 7 | Jaílma de Lima | Brazil | 1:00.18 | |
| 7 | 2 | Danielle Todman | United States | 1:09.55 | |
