= Athletics at the 2016 Summer Olympics – Women's 400 metres hurdles =

Women's 400 metres hurdles at the Games of the XXXI Olympiad
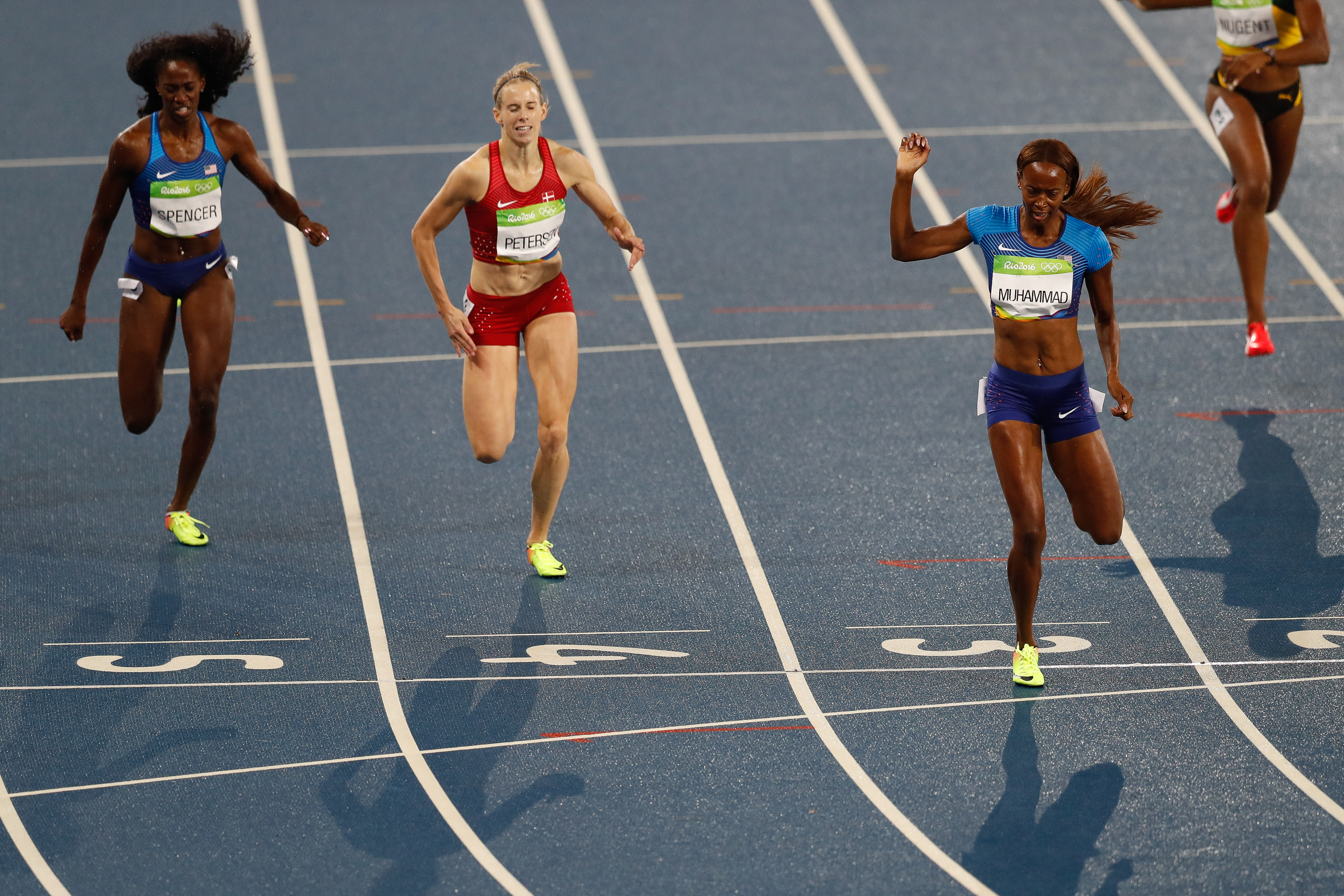
- The finish of the final.
- Venue: Olympic Stadium
- Dates: 15 August 2016 (heats); 16 August 2016 (semifinals); 18 August 2016 (final)
- Competitors: 48 from 33 nations
- Winning time: 53.13

Medalists
1st place, gold medalist(s)		Dalilah Muhammad	United States
2nd place, silver medalist(s)		Sara Petersen	Denmark
3rd place, bronze medalist(s)		Ashley Spencer	United States

The women's 400 metres hurdles competition at the 2016 Summer Olympics in Rio de Janeiro, Brazil was held at the Olympic Stadium between 15 and 18 August.

== Summary ==
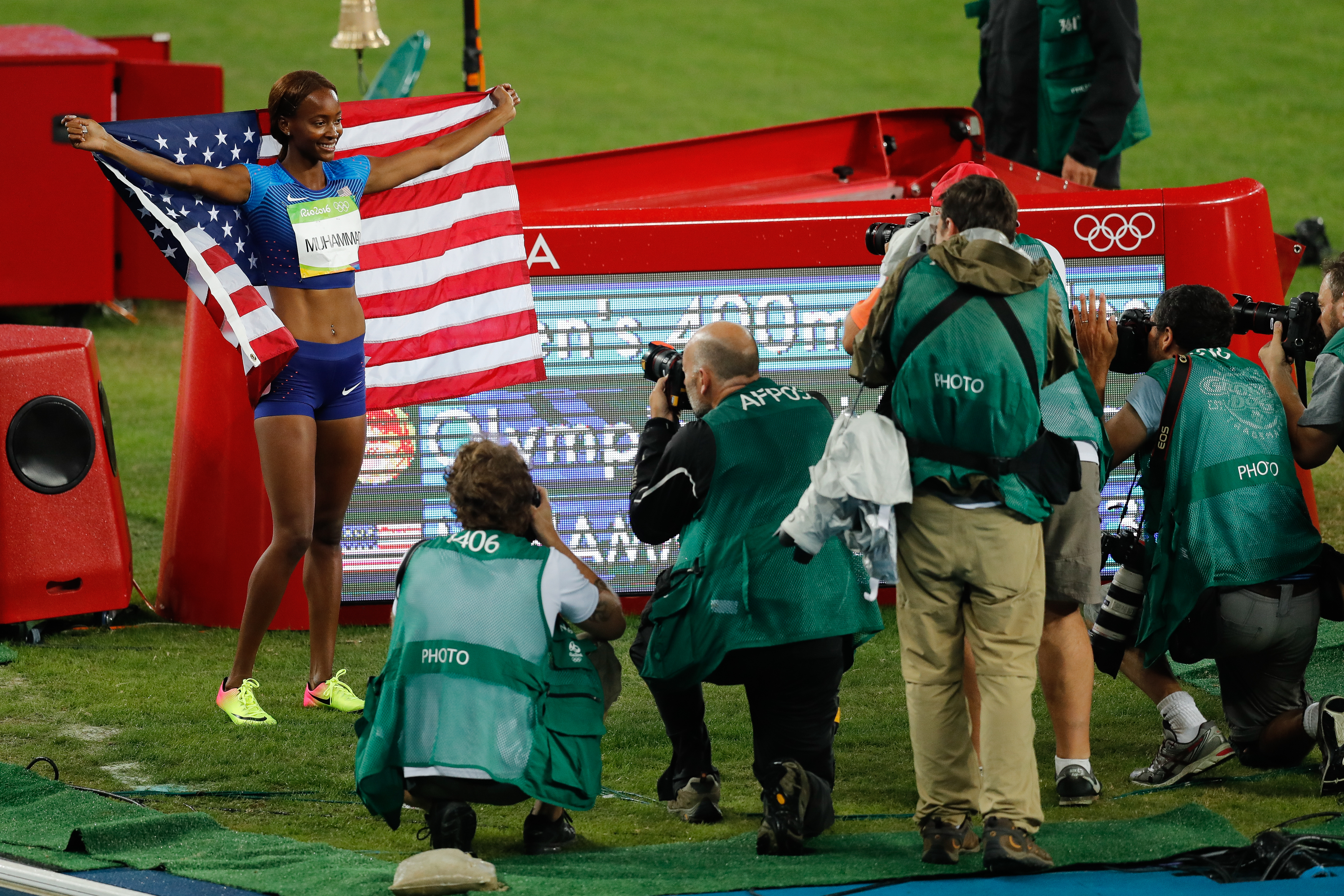
Muhammad celebrating

The 2012 Olympic champion Natalya Antyukh could not have entered due to Russia's team doping ban. Of the medallists from the 2012 Olympics and 2015 World Championships only Czech athlete Zuzana Hejnová was present, though her form was lacking that season. The three American medallists of that period did not qualify at the American trials, which were headed by Dalilah Muhammad in a world-leading 52.88 seconds. The top-four ranked Shamier Little and Georganne Moline were beaten by Ashley Spencer and 16-year-old Sydney McLaughlin. Janieve Russell of Jamaica ranked third for the season but had fitness issues during preparation. Eilidh Doyle, Sara Slott Petersen and Wenda Nel were the only other entrants with times under 54.5 seconds that year.

In the final, Dalilah Muhammad went out aggressively, with a clear lead over the first hurdle. She made up the stagger on Sara Petersen to her outside before the end of the first turn. When they hit the backstretch the positions revealed that Petersen was clearly out second best. She continued to lead down the backstretch and through the turn, with Petersen trying to keep pace from behind further to run around the turn. It is an all or nothing strategy, the only question is if she would tie up in the last 100. Muhammad had to stretch her strides to get over the eighth hurdle, a tip to Petersen that Muhammad might come back. Petersen made a run at Muhammad, perhaps achieving a slight gain between the ninth and tenth hurdle. But Muhammad did not tie up, the gap didn't shrink and Muhammad had a clear victory. At the eight hurdle, two time world champion and the only returning medalist from 2012 Zuzana Hejnová and Janieve Russel were in a battle for bronze. Ashley Spencer and Eilidh Doyle were in a battle for dead last place, 3 metres behind the bronze medal battle. Over the last two hurdles, Russel faded, while Hejnová stayed about the same distance behind Petersen. But Spencer was in a different gear, running the last hundred like a 100-metre hurdler, passing three Jamaicans and Hejnová then continuing her rush, making a run at Petersen.

Petersen broke her own Danish National Record while winning silver.

The following evening the medals were presented by Nita Ambani, IOC member, India and Nawal El Moutawakel, Council Member of the IAAF.

== Competition format ==
The women's 400 m hurdles competition had three rounds: a heats round with six races, three semi-finals, and a single final. The top three from each heat and the six fastest non-qualifiers progress to the semi-final stage. The top two of each semi-final and the two fastest non-qualifiers of that round compete in the final.

== Records ==
Prior to the competition, the existing World and Olympic records were as follows.

World record	Yuliya Pechenkina (RUS)	52.34	Tula, Russia	8 August 2003
Olympic record	Melaine Walker (JAM)	52.64	Beijing, China	20 August 2008
2016 World leading	Dalilah Muhammad (USA)	52.88	Eugene, United States	10 July 2016

The following national record was established during the competition:

Country	Athlete	Round	Time	Notes
Denmark	Sara Petersen (DEN)	Final	53.55 s	

== Schedule ==
All times are Brasília Time (UTC−3)

Date	Time	Round
Monday, 15 August 2016	21:30	Heats
Tuesday, 16 August 2016	21:10	Semifinals
Thursday, 18 August 2016	22:15	Finals

== Results ==
=== Heats ===
Qualification rule: first 3 of each heat (Q) plus the 6 fastest times (q) qualified.

==== Heat 1 ====
Rank	Lane	Athlete	Nationality	Time	Notes
1	7	Ristananna Tracey	Jamaica	54.88	Q
2	4	Zuzana Hejnová	Czech Republic	55.54	Q
3	1	Ayomide Folorunso	Italy	55.78	Q
4	6	Stina Troest	Denmark	56.06	q
5	2	Sydney McLaughlin	United States	56.32	q
6	3	Petra Fontanive	Switzerland	56.80	
7	8	Zurian Hechavarría	Cuba	57.28	
8	5	Maureen Jelagat Maiyo	Kenya	57.97	

==== Heat 2 ====
Rank	Lane	Athlete	Nationality	Time	Notes
1	7	Joanna Linkiewicz	Poland	56.07	Q
2	3	Janieve Russel	Jamaica	56.13	Q
3	6	Grace Claxton	Puerto Rico	56.40	Q
4	8	Tia-Adana Belle	Barbados	56.68	
5	2	Sparkle McKnight	Trinidad and Tobago	56.80	
6	4	Jackie Baumann	Germany	59.04	
7	5	Drita Islami	Macedonia	1:01.18	
8	1	Chanice Chase-Taylor	Canada	1:02.83	

==== Heat 3 ====
Rank	Lane	Athlete	Nationality	Time	Notes
1	5	Ashley Spencer	United States	55.12	Q
2	7	Leah Nugent	Jamaica	55.66	Q
2	6	Viktoriya Tkachuk	Ukraine	56.14	Q
3	8	Denisa Rosolova	Czech Republic	56.36	q
4	1	Lea Sprunger	Switzerland	56.58	
5	3	Amalie Iuel	Norway	56.75	
6	4	Hayat Lambarki	Morocco	1:00.83	
7	2	Lilit Harutyunyan	Armenia	1:03.13	

==== Heat 4 ====
Rank	Lane	Athlete	Nationality	Time	Notes
1	5	Sara Petersen	Denmark	55.20	Q
2	1	Wenda Nel	South Africa	55.55	Q
3	4	Emilia Ankiewicz	Poland	55.89	Q
4	7	Yadisleidy Pedroso	Italy	55.91	q
5	3	Janeil Bellille	Trinidad and Tobago	56.25	q
6	2	Katsiaryna Belanovich	Belarus	56.55	
7	8	Axelle Dauwens	Belgium	57.68	
8	6	Ghofrane Mohammad	Syria	58.85	

==== Heat 5 ====
Rank	Lane	Athlete	Nationality	Time	Notes
1	3	Dalilah Muhammad	United States	55.33	Q
2	7	Noelle Montcalm	Canada	56.07	Q
3	6	Hanna Titimets	Ukraine	56.24	Q
4	1	Lauren Wells	Australia	56.26	q
5	2	Phara Anacharsis	France	56.64	
6	4	Vera Barbosa	Portugal	57.28	
7	5	Thị Huyền Nguyễn	Vietnam	57.87	
8	8	Natalya Asanova	Uzbekistan	1:02.37	

==== Heat 6 ====
Rank	Lane	Athlete	Nationality	Time	Notes
1	6	Eilidh Doyle	Great Britain	55.46	Q
2	1	Sage Watson	Canada	55.93	Q
3	3	Olena Kolesnychenko	Ukraine	56.61	Q
4	2	Amaka Ogoegbunam	Nigeria	56.96	
5	5	Satomi Kubokura	Japan	57.34	
6	8	Marzia Caravelli	Italy	57.77	
7	7	Sharolyn Scott	Costa Rica	58.27	
8	4	Aleksandra Romanova	Kazakhstan	59.36	

=== Semifinals ===
Qualification rule: first 2 of each heat (Q) plus the 2 fastest times (q) qualified.

==== Semifinal 1 ====
Rank	Lane	Athlete	Nationality	Time	Notes
1	4	Zuzana Hejnová	Czech Republic	54.55	Q, SB
2	5	Ristananna Tracey	Jamaica	54.80	Q
3	6	Joanna Linkiewicz	Poland	55.35	
4	1	Stina Troest	Denmark	56.00	SB
5	2	Sydney McLaughlin	United States	56.22	
6	3	Noelle Montcalm	Canada	56.28	
7	7	Ayomide Folorunso	Italy	56.37	
8	8	Olena Kolesnychenko	Ukraine	56.77	

==== Semifinal 2 ====
Rank	Lane	Athlete	Nationality	Time	Notes
1	5	Ashley Spencer	United States	54.87	Q
2	4	Janieve Russel	Jamaica	54.92	Q
3	3	Eilidh Doyle	Great Britain	54.99	q
4	7	Hanna Titimets	Ukraine	55.27	
5	1	Yadisleidy Pedroso	Italy	55.78	SB
6	6	Wenda Nel	South Africa	55.83	
7	8	Emilia Ankiewicz	Poland	56.99	
8	2	Denisa Rosolová	Czech Republic	57.39	

==== Semifinal 3 ====
Rank	Lane	Athlete	Nationality	Time	Notes
1	3	Dalilah Muhammad	United States	53.89	Q
2	5	Sara Petersen	Denmark	54.55	Q
3	6	Leah Nugent	Jamaica	54.98	q, PB
4	4	Sage Watson	Canada	55.44	
5	7	Grace Claxton	Puerto Rico	55.85	PB
6	2	Janeil Bellille	Trinidad and Tobago	56.06	SB
7	1	Lauren Wells	Australia	56.83	
8	8	Viktoriya Tkachuk	Ukraine	56.87	

=== Final ===
Rank	Lane	Athlete	Nationality	Time	Notes
1st place, gold medalist(s)	3	Dalilah Muhammad	United States	53.13	
2nd place, silver medalist(s)	4	Sara Petersen	Denmark	53.55	NR
3rd place, bronze medalist(s)	5	Ashley Spencer	United States	53.72	PB
4	6	Zuzana Hejnová	Czech Republic	53.92	SB
5	7	Ristananna Tracey	Jamaica	54.15	PB
6	2	Leah Nugent	Jamaica	54.45	PB
7	8	Janieve Russel	Jamaica	54.56	
8	1	Eilidh Doyle	Great Britain	54.61	
