= Athletics at the 2012 Summer Olympics – Women's 400 metres hurdles =

Women's 400 metres hurdles at the Games of the XXX Olympiad
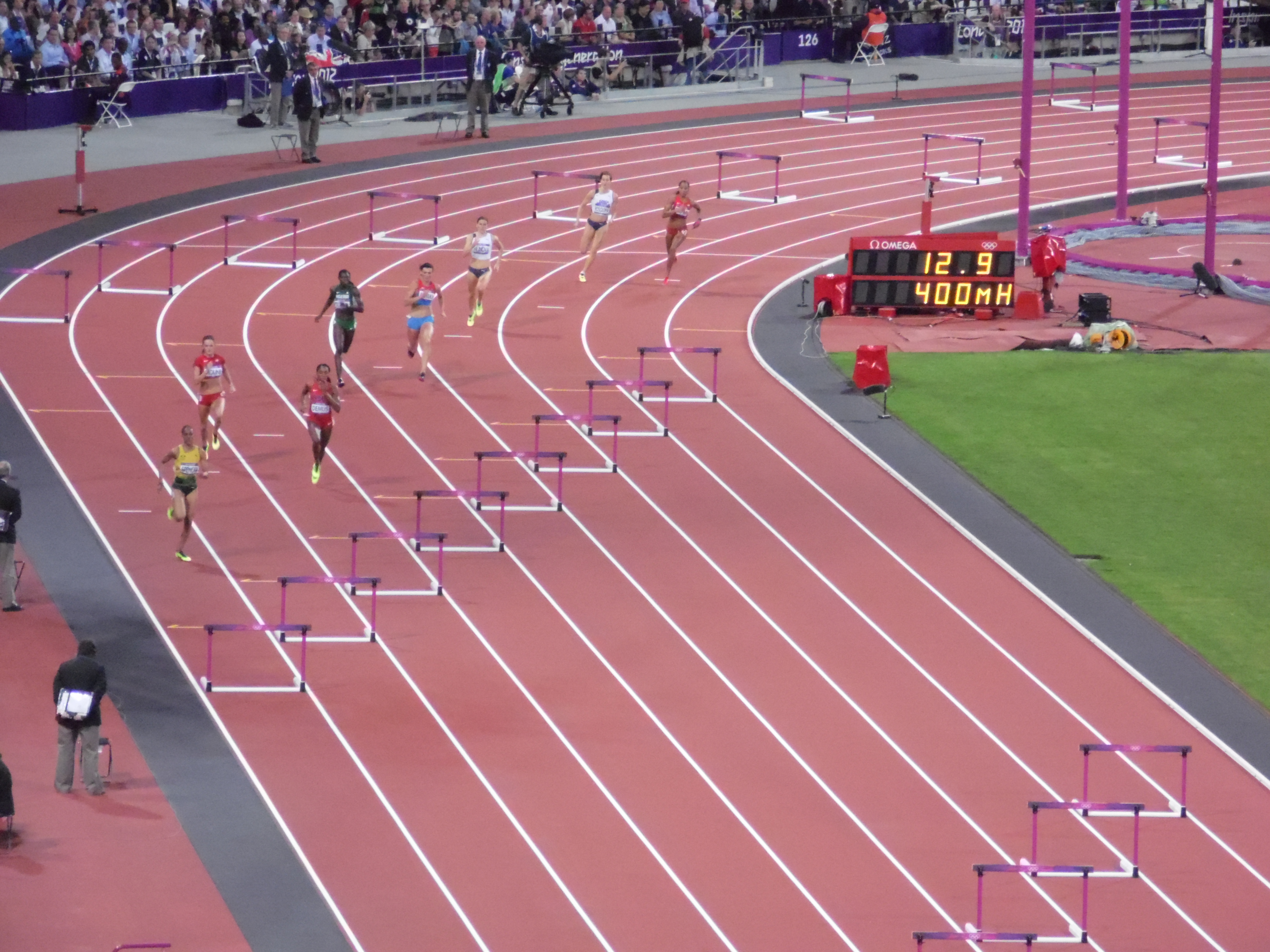
- Venue: Olympic Stadium
- Date: 5–8 August
- Competitors: 43 from 35 nations
- Winning time: 52.77

Medalists
1st place, gold medalist(s)		Lashinda Demus	United States
2nd place, silver medalist(s)		Zuzana Hejnová	Czech Republic
3rd place, bronze medalist(s)		Kaliese Spencer	Jamaica

Official Video

The women's 400 metres hurdles competition at the 2012 Summer Olympics in London, United Kingdom was held at the Olympic Stadium on 5–8 August.

== Summary ==
The opening round went largely to form, except 2012 world #7 Vania Stambolova took herself out crashing the first hurdle. Vera Barbosa set the national record for Portugal in advancing.

The first semi final loaded up Natalya Antyukh and Zuzana Hejnová who pushed each other to the finish and the top two qualifying times, plus taking T'erea Brown to the top time qualifier. In the second semi Lashinda Demus had a clear lead, slowing on the way home to just exert enough effort to finish first. The final semi was the slowest led by Muizat Ajoke Odumosu's Nigerian national record, Georganne Moline and Denisa Rosolova battled for second, with Rosolova taking the other time qualifier in the process.

In the final, Demus was first over the first two hurdles, then Antyukh steadily built her lead to a full stride at hurdle 9, with Demus the closest challenger. Antyukh stuttered the tenth hurdle, opening the door for Demus to chase her to the finish line, but Antyukh held on for gold, Demus disappointed with silver and Hejnová clearly in the bronze medal position.

Antyukh's time brought her to the number 6 athlete of all time, defeating Demus who already held number 3.

In 2020, Antyukh was among four Russian track and field athletes charged with doping offences, facing charges of using a prohibited substance or method. The Athletics Integrity Unit said the cases were based on an investigation into Russian doping for the World Anti-Doping Agency presented in 2016 by Canadian lawyer Richard McLaren. Her ban was confirmed on 7 April 2021 by the Court of Arbitration for Sport when she was banned from athletics for 4 years with all her results from 30 June 2013 onwards disqualified. Initially, her Olympic gold was not in danger. However, in October 2022, over 10 years and two months after the medals were awarded, her results from July 2012 to June 2013 were disqualified for a doping violation, stripping her of the gold medal. American silver medalist Lashinda Demus could potentially receive the gold medal, which was pending reallocation by the International Olympic Committee as of 24 October 2022. On 21 December 2022, World Athletics upgraded Demus to first place, while the IOC had not yet done so.

== Competition format ==
The women's 400 m hurdles competition consisted of heats (Round 1), semifinals and a final. The fastest competitors from each race in the heats qualified for the semifinals along with the fastest overall competitors not already qualified that were required to fill the available spaces in the semifinals. 24 competitors qualified from the heats for the semifinals. A total of eight competitors qualified for the final from the semifinals.

== Records ==
Prior to the competition, the existing world record, Olympic record, and world leading time were as follows:

World record	Yuliya Pechonkina (RUS)	52.34 s	Tula, Russia	8 August 2003
Olympic record	Melaine Walker (JAM)	52.64 s	Beijing, China	20 August 2008
World Leading	Natalya Antyukh (RUS)	53.40 s	Cheboksary, Russia	4 July 2012

== Schedule ==
All times are British Summer Time (UTC+1)

Date	Time	Round
Sunday, 5 August 2012	19:00	Round 1
Monday, 6 August 2012	20:15	Semifinals
Wednesday, 8 August 2012	20:45	Finals

== Results ==
=== Heats ===
Official video of First Round

Qual. rule: first 4 of each heat (Q) plus the 4 fastest times (q) qualified.

==== Heat 1 ====
Rank	Athlete	Nation	Time	Notes
1	Zuzana Hejnová	Czech Republic	53.96	Q, SB
2	T'erea Brown	United States	54.72	Q, PB
3	Eilidh Child	Great Britain	56.14	Q
4	Sarah Wells	Canada	56.47	Q
5	Eglė Staišiūnaitė	Lithuania	57.79	
6	Tatyana Azarova	Kazakhstan	58.53	
7	Maureen Jelagat Maiyo	Kenya	1:02.16	
–	Vania Stambolova	Bulgaria	DNF	

==== Heat 2 ====
Rank	Athlete	Nation	Time	Notes
1	Kaliese Spencer	Jamaica	54.02	Q
2	Muizat Ajoke Odumosu	Nigeria	54.93	Q
3	Anna Jesień	Poland	55.44	Q, SB
4	Lauren Boden	Australia	56.27	q
5	Raasin McIntosh	Liberia	57.39	
6	Natalya Asanova	Uzbekistan	58.05	
7	Noraseela Mohd Khalid	Malaysia	1:00.16	
-	Natalya Antyukh	Russia	DQ (53.90)	Doping
–	Ghfran Almouhamad	Syria	DQ (58.09)	Doping

- Ghfran Almouhamad originally finished in eighth place with a time of 58.09, but was later disqualified for testing positive for methylhexaneamine.
- Raasin McIntosh was originally disqualified for unknown reasons. It was later overturned.

==== Heat 3 ====
Rank	Athlete	Nation	Time	Notes
1	Lashinda Demus	United States	54.60	Q
2	Hanna Titimets	Ukraine	55.08	Q
3	Vera Barbosa	Portugal	55.22	Q, NR
4	Elena Churakova	Russia	55.26	Q
5	Denisa Rosolová	Czech Republic	55.42	q
6	Sara Petersen	Denmark	56.01	q
7	Lucy Jaramillo	Ecuador	57.74	
8	Princesa Oliveros	Colombia	58.95	

==== Heat 4 ====
Rank	Athlete	Nation	Time	Notes
1	Georganne Moline	United States	54.31	Q, PB
2	Nickiesha Wilson	Jamaica	55.53	Q
3	Irina Davydova	Russia	55.55	Q
4	Elodie Ouédraogo	Belgium	55.89	Q
5	Angela Moroșanu	Romania	56.64	
6	Sharolyn Scott	Costa Rica	57.03	
7	Janeil Bellille	Trinidad and Tobago	57.27	
8	Nikolina Horvat	Croatia	58.49	
–	Nagihan Karadere	Turkey	DQ	R 162.7

- Nagihan Karadere was disqualified for false starting.

==== Heat 5 ====
Rank	Athlete	Nation	Time	Notes
1	Perri Shakes-Drayton	Great Britain	54.62	Q
2	Melaine Walker	Jamaica	54.78	Q
3	Hanna Yaroshchuk	Ukraine	54.81	Q
4	Hayat Lambarki	Morocco	55.58	Q
5	Satomi Kubokura	Japan	55.85	q, SB
6	Huang Xiaoxiao	China	56.29	
7	Déborah Rodríguez	Uruguay	57.04	NR
8	Jailma de Lima	Brazil	57.05	
9	Christine Sonali Merrill	Sri Lanka	57.15	SB

=== Semifinals ===
Qual. rule: first 2 of each heat (Q) plus the 2 fastest times (q) qualified.

==== Heat 1 ====
Rank	Athlete	Nation	Time	Notes
1	Zuzana Hejnová	Czech Republic	53.62	Q, SB
2	T'erea Brown	United States	54.21	q, PB
3	Elodie Ouedraogo	Belgium	55.20	PB
4	Nickiesha Wilson	Jamaica	55.77	
5	Hayat Lambarki	Morocco	56.18	
6	Vera Barbosa	Portugal	56.27	
7	Lauren Boden	Australia	56.66	
-	Natalya Antyukh	Russia	DQ (53.30)	Doping

- Lauren Boden was originally disqualified for unknown reasons, but it was later overturned.

==== Heat 2 ====
Rank	Athlete	Nation	Time	Notes
1	Lashinda Demus	United States	54.08	Q
2	Kaliese Spencer	Jamaica	54.20	Q
3	Perri Shakes-Drayton	Great Britain	55.19	
4	Hanna Yaroshchuk	Ukraine	55.51	
5	Irina Davydova	Russia	55.86	
6	Sara Petersen	Denmark	56.21	
7	Anna Jesień	Poland	56.28	
8	Sarah Wells	Canada	56.71	

==== Heat 3 ====
Rank	Athlete	Nation	Time	Notes
1	Muizat Ajoke Odumosu	Nigeria	54.40	Q, NR
2	Georganne Moline	United States	54.74	Q
3	Denisa Rosolová	Czech Republic	54.87	q
4	Hanna Titimets	Ukraine	55.10	
5	Elena Churakova	Russia	55.70	
6	Melaine Walker	Jamaica	55.74	
7	Eilidh Child	Great Britain	56.03	
8	Satomi Kubokura	Japan	56.25	

- Denisa Rosolová and Hanna Titimets were originally disqualified for unknown reasons, but they were overturned. Denisa Rosolová therefore qualified for the final.

=== Final ===
Rank	Lane	Athlete	Nation	Time	Notes
1st place, gold medalist(s)	7	Lashinda Demus	United States	52.77	SB WL
2nd place, silver medalist(s)	4	Zuzana Hejnová	Czech Republic	53.38	SB
3rd place, bronze medalist(s)	9	Kaliese Spencer	Jamaica	53.66	SB
4	8	Georganne Moline	United States	53.92	PB
5	2	T'erea Brown	United States	55.07	
6	3	Denisa Rosolová	Czech Republic	55.27	
7	6	Muizat Ajoke Odumosu	Nigeria	55.31	
—N/a	5	Natalya Antyukh	Russia	DQ (52.70)	Doping

- Perri Shakes-Drayton originally qualified for the final, but she was later taken out after Denisa Rosolová's disqualification was overturned.
