= 2012 European Athletics Championships – Women's 400 metres hurdles =

Women's 400 metres hurdles at the European Athletics Championships
- Venue: Helsinki Olympic Stadium
- Location: Helsinki, Finland
- Dates: 27, 28 and 29 June 2012
- Winning time: 53.77 s

Medalists
gold medal	Irina Davydova	Russia
silver medal	Denisa Rosolová	Czech Republic
bronze medal	Hanna Yaroshchuk	Ukraine

The women's 400 metres hurdles at the 2012 European Athletics Championships was held at the Helsinki Olympic Stadium on 27, 28 and 29 June.

== Medalists ==
Gold	Irina Davydova; Russia
Silver	Denisa Rosolová; Czech Republic
Bronze	Hanna Yaroshchuk; Ukraine

== Records ==
Standing records prior to the 2012 European Athletics Championships
World record	Yuliya Pechonkina (RUS)	52.34	Tula, Russia	8 August 2003
European record	Yuliya Pechonkina (RUS)	52.34	Tula, Russia	8 August 2003
Championship record	Natalya Antyukh (RUS)	52.92	Barcelona, Spain	30 July 2010
World Leading	Irina Davydova (RUS)	53.87	Sochi, Russia	27 May 2012
European Leading	Irina Davydova (RUS)	53.87	Sochi, Russia	27 May 2012
Broken records during the 2012 European Athletics Championships
World Leading; European Leading	Irina Davydova (RUS)	53.77	Helsinki, Finland	29 June 2012

== Schedule ==
Date	Time	Round
27 June 2012	14:30	Round 1
28 June 2012	10:30	Semifinals
29 June 2012	20:00	Final

== Results ==
=== Round 1 ===
First 3 in each heat (Q) and 4 best performers (q) advance to the Semifinals.

Rank	Heat	Lane	Name	Nationality	Time	Note
1	2	8	Zuzana Hejnová	Czech Republic	55.24	Q
2	1	2	Angela Moroșanu	Romania	55.37	Q
3	1	6	Élodie Ouédraogo	Belgium	55.39	Q, SB
4	2	6	Hanna Yaroshchuk	Ukraine	55.73	Q
5	1	7	Vera Barbosa	Portugal	55.80	Q, NR
6	3	6	Denisa Rosolová	Czech Republic	55.98	Q
7	4	3	Irina Davydova	Russia	56.00	Q
8	3	4	Yelena Churakova	Russia	56.08	Q
9	2	2	Jessie Barr	Ireland	56.30	Q
9	1	3	Hanna Titimets	Ukraine	56.30	q
11	3	5	Tina Matusińska	Poland	56.33	Q
12	4	7	Sara Petersen	Denmark	56.58	Q
12	2	3	Eglė Staišiūnaitė	Lithuania	56.58	q, PB
14	4	2	Zuzana Bergrová	Czech Republic	56.59	Q, SB
15	4	8	Manuela Gentili	Italy	57.10	q
16	4	4	Meghan Beesley	Great Britain	57.18	q
17	2	5	Axelle Dauwens	Belgium	57.19	
18	2	7	Emma Millard	Finland	57.61	PB
18	3	3	Tina Kron	Germany	57.61	
20	1	5	Nikolina Horvat	Croatia	57.74	
21	3	8	Frida Persson	Sweden	57.83	PB
22	2	4	Phara Anacharsis	France	58.02	
23	3	2	Stine Tomb	Norway	58.24	
24	4	6	Amaliya Sharoyan	Armenia	58.27	
25	4	5	Özge Akın	Turkey	58.90	
26	3	7	Sema Apak	Turkey	58.93	
27	1	4	Elif Yıldırım	Turkey	59.43	

=== Semifinals ===
First 3 in each heat (Q) and 2 best performers (q) advance to the Final.

Rank	Heat	Lane	Name	Nationality	Time	Note
1	2	4	Irina Davydova	Russia	54.68	Q
2	1	6	Hanna Yaroshchuk	Ukraine	54.69	Q, PB
3	1	5	Denisa Rosolová	Czech Republic	54.71	Q
4	1	3	Yelena Churakova	Russia	54.92	Q, SB
5	2	3	Zuzana Hejnová	Czech Republic	55.36	Q
6	2	5	Élodie Ouédraogo	Belgium	55.77	Q
7	2	8	Zuzana Bergrová	Czech Republic	55.78	q, PB
8	1	8	Jessie Barr	Ireland	55.93	q, PB
9	2	6	Sara Petersen	Denmark	56.07	
10	1	7	Tina Matusińska	Poland	56.43	
11	2	7	Vera Barbosa	Portugal	56.58	
12	1	1	Manuela Gentili	Italy	57.03	
13	2	2	Hanna Titimets	Ukraine	57.26	
14	2	1	Meghan Beesley	Great Britain	57.32	
15	1	2	Eglė Staišiūnaitė	Lithuania	58.76	
16	1	4	Angela Moroșanu	Romania	58.96	

=== Final ===
Rank	Lane	Name	Nationality	Time	Note
1st place, gold medalist(s)	5	Irina Davydova	Russia	53.77	WL
2nd place, silver medalist(s)	3	Denisa Rosolová	Czech Republic	54.24	PB
3rd place, bronze medalist(s)	4	Hanna Yaroshchuk	Ukraine	54.35	PB
4	6	Zuzana Hejnová	Czech Republic	54.49	
5	8	Yelena Churakova	Russia	54.78	PB
6	7	Élodie Ouédraogo	Belgium	55.95	
7	1	Zuzana Bergrová	Czech Republic	56.26	
8	2	Jessie Barr	Ireland	56.83	
