= Aleksandra Romanova =

Kazakhstani hurdler

Aleksandra Romanova (born December 26, 1990) is a Kazakhstani hurdler. She competed at the 2016 Summer Olympics in the women's 400 metres hurdles race; her time of 59.36 seconds in the heats did not qualify her for the semifinals.
