= Christiane Klopsch =

German hurdler

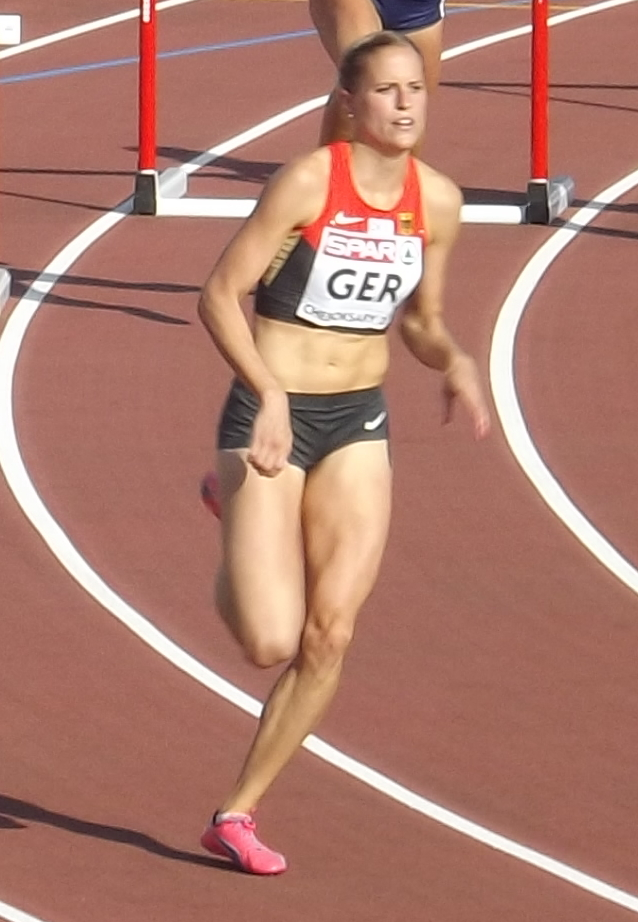
Christiane Klopsch at the 2015 European Team Championships

Christiane Bettina Klopsch (born 21 August 1990 in Marburg) is a German athlete specialising in the 400 metres hurdles. Her biggest individual achievement is the fourth place at the 2015 Summer Universiade in Gwangju.

Her personal best in the event is 56.02 seconds set in Regensburg in 2014.

== Competition record ==
Year	Competition	Venue	Position	Event	Notes
Representing Germany
2007	World Youth Championships	Ostrava, Czech Republic	6th	400 m hurdles	60.51
2008	World Junior Championships	Bydgoszcz, Poland	15th (sf)	400 m hurdles	60.39
2009	European Junior Championships	Novi Sad, Serbia	5th	400 m hurdles	58.80
2011	European U23 Championships	Ostrava, Czech Republic	6th	400 m hurdles	57.05
2011	Universiade	Shenzhen, China	17th (h)	400 m hurdles	58.84
2011	Universiade	Shenzhen, China	12th (h)	4 × 100 m relay	46.80
2012	European Championships	Helsinki, Finland	5th	4 × 400 m relay	3:27.81
2013	Universiade	Kazan, Russia	7th	400 m hurdles	57.93
2014	European Championships	Zürich, Switzerland	9th (sf)	400 m hurdles	56.28
2014	European Championships	Zürich, Switzerland	6th	4 × 400 m relay	3:27.69
2015	Universiade	Gwangju, South Korea	4th	400 m hurdles	56.75

== Personal bests ==
Outdoor

- 400 metres – 52.99 (Oordegem-Lede 2014)
- 400 metres hurdles – 56.02 (Regensburg 2014)

Indoor

- 400 metres – 53.69 (Karlsruhe 2015)
