= Joanna Linkiewicz =

Polish hurdler (born 1990)

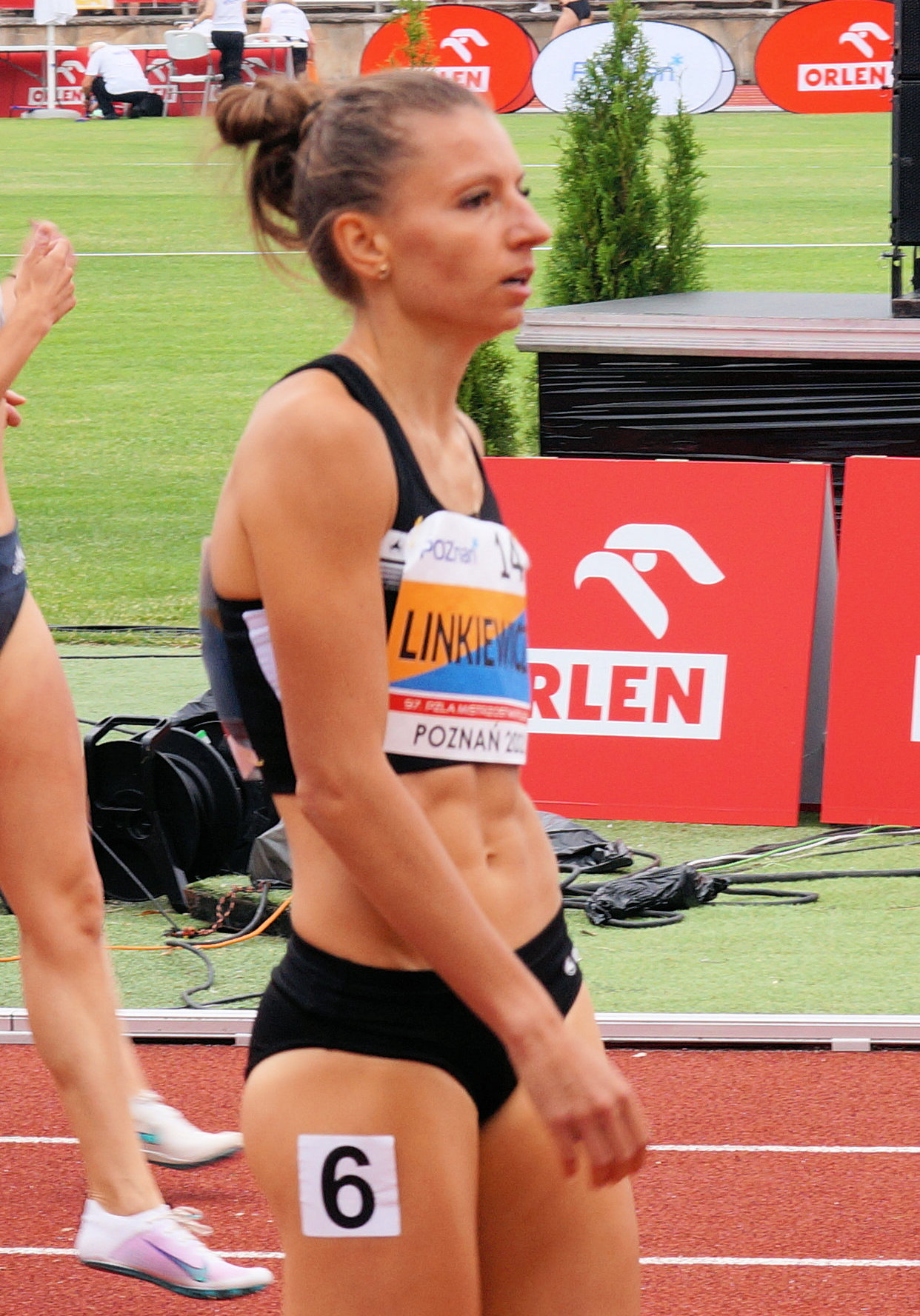
- Linkiewicz at the 2021 Polish Championships

Personal information
- Nationality: Polish
- Born: 2 May 1990 (age 36) Wrocław, Poland
- Education: University of Physical Education in Wrocław
- Height: 1.68 m (5 ft 6 in)
- Weight: 55 kg (121 lb)

Sport
- Sport: Athletics
- Event: 400 metres hurdles
- Club: AZS-AWF Wrocław
- Coached by: Marek Rożej
Medal record
Women's athletics
Representing Poland
World Indoor Championships
Silver medal – second place	2018 Birmingham	4×400 m
European Championships
Silver medal – second place	2016 Amsterdam	400 m hurdles
European Indoor Championships
Bronze medal – third place	2015 Prague	4×400 m relay
European Team Championships
Bronze medal – third place	2019 Bydgoszcz	400 m hurdles
Universiade
Gold medal – first place	2015 Gwangju	400 m hurdles
Gold medal – first place	2015 Gwangju	4×400 m relay
Silver medal – second place	2017 Taipei	400 m hurdles

Joanna Linkiewicz (Polish pronunciation: [jɔˈanna linˈkjɛvit͡ʂ]; born 2 May 1990) is a Polish athlete specialising in the 400 metres hurdles. She placed 8th at the 2014 European Championships to take a silver medal at the competition two years later.

Linkiewicz won a bronze medal in the 4 × 400 m relays at the 2015 European Indoor Championships, and a silver running in the heats at the 2018 World Indoor Championships. She took 400 m hurdles gold at the 2015 Universiade adding second gold in 4 × 400 m relay, and won a silver medal in her individual event at the 2017 Universiade.

== Competition record ==
Year	Competition	Venue	Position	Event	Notes
Representing Poland
2008	World Junior Championships	Bydgoszcz, Poland	12th (h)	4 × 400 m relay	3:43.08
2011	European U23 Championships	Ostrava, Czech Republic	16th (h)	400 m hurdles	61.24
2011	European U23 Championships	Ostrava, Czech Republic	4th	4 × 400 m relay	3:36.42
2013	Universiade	Kazan, Russia	14th (h)	400 m hurdles	60.01
2013	Universiade	Kazan, Russia	5th	4 × 400 m relay	3:45.62
2014	World Indoor Championships	Sopot, Poland	3rd (h)	4 × 400 m relay	3:29.48
2014	IAAF World Relays	Nassau, Bahamas	5th	4 × 400 m relay	3:27.37
2014	European Championships	Zürich, Switzerland	8th	400 m hurdles	56.59
2014	European Championships	Zürich, Switzerland	5th	4 × 400 m relay	3:25.73
2015	European Indoor Championships	Prague, Czech Republic	3rd	4 × 400 m relay	3:31.90
2015	Universiade	Gwangju, South Korea	1st	400 m hurdles	55.62
2015	Universiade	Gwangju, South Korea	1st	4 × 400 m relay	3:31.98
2015	World Championships	Beijing, China	25th (h)	400 m hurdles	56.51
2015	World Championships	Beijing, China	15th (h)	4 × 400 m relay	3:32.83
2016	European Championships	Amsterdam, Netherlands	2nd	400 m hurdles	55.33
2016	Olympic Games	Rio de Janeiro, Brazil	10th (sf)	400 m hurdles	55.35
2017	World Championships	London, United Kingdom	15th (sf)	400 m hurdles	56.25
2017	Universiade	Taipei, Taiwan	2nd	400 m hurdles	55.90
2018	World Indoor Championships	Birmingham, United Kingdom	2nd (h)	4 × 400 m relay	3:32.07 (Note: Time from the heats; Linkiewicz was replaced in the final)
2018	European Championships	Berlin, Germany	14th (sf)	400 m hurdles	56.06
2019	World Championships	Doha, Qatar	14th (sf)	400 m hurdles	55.38
2021	Olympic Games	Tokyo, Japan	14th (sf)	400 m hurdles	55.67

== Personal bests ==
Outdoor

- 400 metres – 47.59 (Paris 2023)
- 400 metres hurdles – 54.93 (Tokyo 2021)

Indoor

- 400 metres – 53.41 (Toruń 2018)
