= Elif Yıldırım =

Turkish sprinter (born 1990)

Elif Yıldırım Gören
Personal information
- Nationality: Turkish
- Born: February 14, 1990 (age 36) İznik, Bursa, Turkey
- Height: 1.70 m (5 ft 7 in)
- Weight: 55 kg (121 lb)

Sport
- Country: Turkey
- Sport: Athletics
- Event: 400m hurdles
- Club: Enka SK
- Coached by: Kemal Şencan and Fausto Ribeiro

Elif Yıldırım Gören (born February 14, 1990) is a former Turkish sprinter, who specialized in the 400m hurdles event. The 1.70 m (5 ft 7 in) tall athlete at 55 kg (121 lb) was a member of Enka SK, where she was coached by Kemal Şencan and Fausto Ribeiro.

Yıldırım was banned for two years by the Turkish Athletic Federation, along with 30 other athletes, from 2013 to 2015 for testing positive for a banned substance.

== Achievements ==
Year	Competition	Venue	Position	Event	Notes
Representing Turkey
2007	5th World Youth Championships	Ostrava, Czech Republic	5th h	400m hurdles	1:01.66
2007	Black Sea Games	Trabzon, Turkey	2nd place, silver medalist(s)	Heptathlon	
2008	World Junior Championships	Bydgoszcz, Poland	25th (h)	400m hurdles	61.06
2008	European Cup Combined Events 2nd League	Maribor, Slovenia	11 7	Heptathlon	4951
2012	21st European Championships	Helsinki, Finland	27th round 1	400m hurdles	59.43
