= Athletics at the 2011 Summer Universiade – Women's 4 × 100 metres relay =

The women's 4 x 100 metres relay event at the 2011 Summer Universiade was held on 20–21 August.

== Medalists ==
Gold	Silver	Bronze
Ukraine; Hanna Titimets; Nataliya Pohrebnyak; Hrystyna Stuy; Yelizaveta Bryzhina	United States; Lakya Brookins; Shayla Mahan; Christina Manning; Tiffany Townsend; Aareon Payne*	Jamaica; Shermaine Williams; Carrie Russell; Anneisha McLaughlin; Anastasia Le-Roy

* Athletes who competed in heats only and received medals.

== Results ==
=== Heats ===
Qualification: First 3 teams of each heat (Q) plus the next 2 fastest (q) qualified for the final.

Rank	Heat	Nation	Athletes	Time	Notes
1	2	Ukraine	Hanna Titimets, Nataliya Pohrebnyak, Hrystyna Stuy, Yelizaveta Bryzhina	43.55	Q
2	2	Jamaica	Shermaine Williams, Carrie Russell, Anneisha McLaughlin, Anastasia Le-Roy	43.81	Q
3	1	Russia	Yuna Mekhti-Zade, Anna Kaygorodova, Yulia Kashina, Yevgeniya Polyakova	44.11	Q
4	1	United States	Lakya Brookins, Aareon Payne, Christina Manning, Shayla Mahan	44.25	Q
5	2	Thailand	Jintara Seangdee, Phatsorn Jaksuninkorn, Tassaporn Wannakit, Nongnuch Sanrat	44.34	Q
6	1	Great Britain	Margaret Adeoye, Ashleigh Nelson, Emily Diamond, Amy Harris	44.55	Q
7	1	Switzerland	Marlen Affentranger, Jacqueline Gasser, Joelle Curti, Léa Sprunger	45.10	q
8	1	China	Yu Lijuan, Zhang Chan, Jiang Shan, Huang Yanli	45.22	q
9	2	South Africa	Cindy Stewart, Stacey Gardiner, Cherese Jones, Sonja van der Merwe	45.26	
10	1	Malaysia	Nurul Abd Kadir, Siti Mohamad, Norjannah Jamaludin, Siti Adabi	45.47	
11	2	Hong Kong	Chan Hoyee, Leung Hausze, Fong Yeepui, Poon Pakyan	45.50	SB
12	2	Germany	V. Freiin von Eynatten, Christiane Klopsch, Michelle Weitzel, Melanie Bauschke	46.80	
13	1	Macau	Io Inchi, Ieong Loi, Leong Kaman, Ng Nganfan	50.25	
	2	Lithuania	Silva Pesackaitė, Agnė Orlauskaitė, Sonata Tamošaitytė, Lina Grinčikaitė	DQ	170.14
	2	Norway	Tale Oerving, Marie Hagle, Siri Eritsland, Randi Kjerstad	DQ	170.14

=== Final ===
Rank	Lane	Nation	Athletes	Time	Notes
1st place, gold medalist(s)	5	Ukraine	Hanna Titimets, Nataliya Pohrebnyak, Hrystyna Stuy, Yelizaveta Bryzhina	43.33	
2nd place, silver medalist(s)	4	United States	Lakya Brookins, Shayla Mahan, Christina Manning, Tiffany Townsend	43.48	
3rd place, bronze medalist(s)	3	Jamaica	Shermaine Williams, Carrie Russell, Anneisha McLaughlin, Anastasia Le-Roy	43.57	
4	8	Great Britain	Amy Harris, Margaret Adeoye, Emily Diamond, Ashleigh Nelson	44.01	
5	7	Thailand	Jintara Seangdee, Phatsorn Jaksuninkorn, Tassaporn Wannakit, Nongnuch Sanrat	44.13	
6	6	Russia	Yuna Mekhti-Zade, Anna Kaygorodova, Yulia Kashina, Yevgeniya Polyakova	44.35	
7	1	Switzerland	Joelle Curti, Jacqueline Gasser, Ellen Sprunger, Léa Sprunger	44.65	
8	2	China	Yu Lijuan, Zhang Chan, Jiang Shan, Huang Yanli	45.37	
