= Vera Barbosa =

Portuguese-Cape Verdean track and field athlete (born 1989)

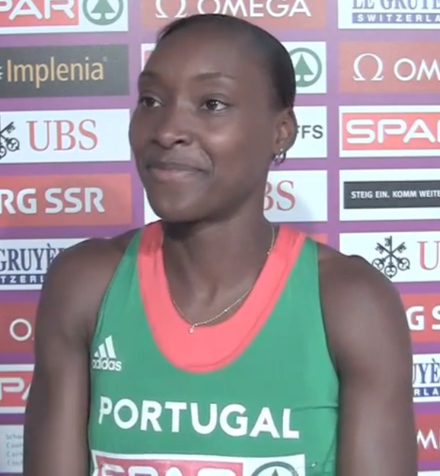
- Barbosa at the 2014 European Athletics Championships

Personal information
- Born: January 13, 1989 (age 37)
- Height: 1.68 m (5 ft 6 in)
- Weight: 58 kg (128 lb)

Sport
- Country: Portugal
- Sport: Athletics
- Event: 400m Hurdles
- Club: Sporting Clube de Portugal
- Coached by: Carlos Silva

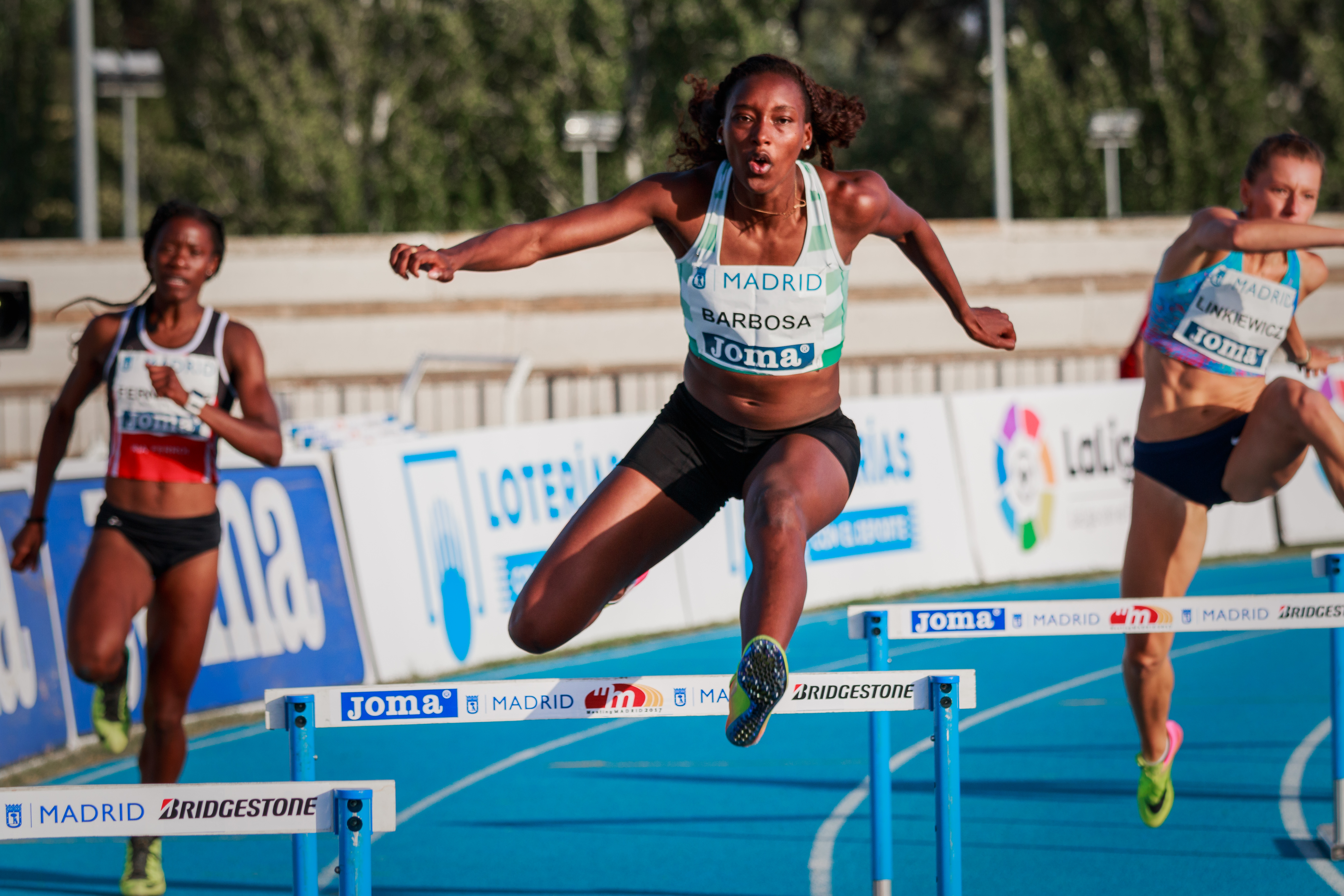

Vera Barbosa (born 13 January 1989 in Vila Franca de Xira) is a Portuguese track and field athlete. She initially competed for Cape Verde, switching to represent Portugal after 2008. At the 400 metres hurdles event at the 2012 Summer Olympics, in the heats she set a new national record with 55.22 seconds.

== Competition record ==
Year	Competition	Venue	Position	Event	Notes
Representing Cape Verde
2007	World Championships	Osaka, Japan	42nd (h)	400 m	58.56
2008	World Indoor Championships	Valencia, Spain	16th (h)	400 m	57.55
Representing Portugal
2009	Lusophony Games	Lisbon, Portugal	5th	400 m	54.89
2009	Lusophony Games	Lisbon, Portugal	2nd	4 × 400 m relay	3:37.90
2009	European U23 Championships	Kaunas, Lithuania	17th (h)	400 m	54.84
2010	Ibero-American Championships	San Fernando, Spain	7th	400 m	55.50
2010	Ibero-American Championships	San Fernando, Spain	6th	4 × 400 m relay	3:39.37
2011	European U23 Championships	Ostrava, Czech Republic	4th	400 m hurdles	55.81
2011	European U23 Championships	Ostrava, Czech Republic	6th	4 × 400 m relay	3:37.28
2011	World Championships	Daegu, South Korea	24th (sf)	400 m hurdles	57.70
2012	European Championships	Helsinki, Finland	11th (sf)	400 m hurdles	56.58
2012	European Championships	Helsinki, Finland	14th (h)	4 × 400 m relay	3:40.79
2012	Olympic Games	London, United Kingdom	21st (sf)	400 m hurdles	56.27
2014	European Championships	Zürich, Switzerland	10th (sf)	400 m hurdles	56.33
2014	European Championships	Zürich, Switzerland	10th (h)	4 × 400 m relay	3:35.41
2016	European Championships	Amsterdam, Netherlands	24th (sf)	400 m hurdles	57.92
2016	Olympic Games	Rio de Janeiro, Brazil	33rd (h)	400 m hurdles	57.28
2022	Mediterranean Games	Oran, Algeria	5th	400 m hurdles	56.82
2022	World Championships	Eugene, United States	30th (h)	400 m hurdles	56.79
2022	European Championships	Munich, Germany	16th (h)	400 m hurdles	57.10
2024	World Indoor Championships	Glasgow, United Kingdom	9th (h)	4 × 400 m relay	3:31.93
2024	Ibero-American Championships	Cuiabá, Brazil	4th	400 m hurdles	56.37
2024	European Championships	Rome, Italy	17th (h)	400 m hurdles	56.81
2024	European Championships	Rome, Italy	13th (h)	4 × 400 m relay	3:29.50
