= Fabienne Kohlmann =

German track and field athlete

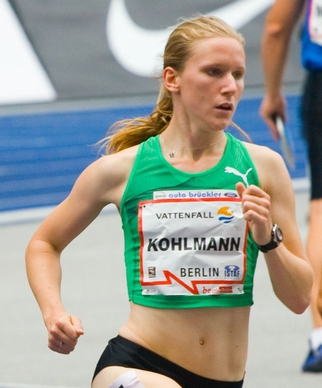
- Kohlmann at the 2010 ISTAF

Personal information
- Born: 6 November 1989 (age 36) Würzburg, West Germany
- Height: 1.70 m (5 ft 7 in)
- Weight: 58 kg (128 lb)

Sport
- Country: Germany
- Sport: Athletics
- Events: 400 metres hurdles, 800 metres

Achievements and titles
- Personal bests: 400 metres hurdles: 55.49 (Barcelona 2010); 800 metres: 1:58.34 (Berlin 2015)

Fabienne Kohlmann (born 6 November 1989 in Würzburg, Bavaria) is a German track and field athlete who specialises in the 400 metres hurdles and the 800 metres.

== International competitions ==
| Year | Competition | Venue | Position | Event | Notes |
Representing Germany
| 2007 | European Junior Championships | Hengelo, Netherlands | 1st | 400 m hurdles | 56.42 |
| 2008 | World Junior Championships | Bydgoszcz, Poland | 8th | 400 m | 54.12 |
| 2008 | World Junior Championships | Bydgoszcz, Poland | 7th | 4 × 400 m relay | 3:39.00 |
| 2009 | European U23 Championships | Kaunas, Lithuania | 10th (sf) | 400 m hurdles | 57.55 |
| 2009 | World Championships | Berlin, Germany | 5th | 4 × 400 m relay | 3:27.61 |
| 2010 | European Team Championships | Bergen, Norway | 2nd | 4 × 400 m relay | 3:26.96 |
| 2010 | European Championships | Barcelona, Spain | 9th | 400 m hurdles | 55.49 |
| 2010 | European Championships | Barcelona, Spain | 1st | 4 × 400 m relay | 3:24.07 |
| 2012 | European Championships | Helsinki, Finland | 5th | 4 × 400 m relay | 3:27.81 |
| 2012 | Olympic Games | London, United Kingdom | 14th (h) | 4 × 400 m relay | 3:31.06 |
| 2015 | Universiade | Gwangju, South Korea | 3rd | 800 m | 1:59.54 |
| 2015 | World Championships | Beijing, China | 15th (sf) | 800 m | 1:59.42 |
| 2016 | European Championships | Amsterdam, Netherlands | 25th (h) | 800 m | 2:05.54 |
| 2016 | Olympic Games | Rio de Janeiro, Brazil | 55th (h) | 800 m | 2:05.36 |
