= 2014 European Athletics Championships – Women's 400 metres hurdles =

Women's 400 metres hurdles at the European Athletics Championships
- Venue: Letzigrund
- Location: Zürich, Switzerland
- Dates: 13, 14, and 16 August 2014
- Winning time: 54.48 s

Medalists
gold medal	Eilidh Child	Great Britain
silver medal	Anna Titimets	Ukraine
bronze medal	Irina Davydova	Russia

The women's 400 metres hurdles at the 2014 European Athletics Championships took place at the Letzigrund on 13, 14 and 16 August.

== Medalists ==
Gold	Eilidh Child; Great Britain
Silver	Anna Titimets; Ukraine
Bronze	Irina Davydova; Russia

== Records ==
Standing records prior to the 2014 European Athletics Championships
World record	Yuliya Pechenkina (RUS)	52.34	Tula, Russia	8 August 2003
European record	Yuliya Pechenkina (RUS)	52.34	Tula, Russia	8 August 2003
Championship record	Natalya Antyukh (RUS)	52.92	Barcelona, Spain	30 July 2010
World Leading	Kaliese Spencer (JAM)	53.41	Kingston, Jamaica	17 June 2014
European Leading	Eilidh Child (GBR)	54.39	Glasgow, Great Britain	11 July 2014

== Schedule ==
Date	Time	Round
13 August 2014	10:55	Round 1
14 August 2014	18:10	Semifinals
16 August 2014	17:15	Final

All times are local times (UTC+2)

== Results ==
=== Round 1 ===
First 3 in each heat (Q) and 4 best performers (q) advance to the Semifinals.

Rank	Heat	Lane	Name	Nationality	Time	Note
1	1	4	Eilidh Child	Great Britain	55.32	Q
2	4	3	Anna Titimets	Ukraine	55.77	Q
3	2	2	Vera Barbosa	Portugal	55.85	Q
4	3	6	Denisa Rosolová	Czech Republic	56.13	Q
5	1	6	Axelle Dauwens	Belgium	56.15	Q
6	4	7	Christiane Klopsch	Germany	56.23	Q
7	1	8	Vera Rudakova	Russia	56.35	Q
8	4	5	Yadisleidy Pedroso	Italy	56.75	Q
9	2	3	Petra Fontanive	Switzerland	56.85	Q
10	4	6	Stina Troest	Denmark	56.95	q
11	1	2	Valentine Arrieta	Switzerland	57.02	q
12	3	2	Joanna Linkiewicz	Poland	57.12	Q
13	2	5	Christine McMahon	Ireland	57.16	Q
14	2	7	Līga Velvere	Latvia	57.43	q
=15	3	4	Irina Davydova	Russia	57.51	Q
=15	3	8	Egle Staisiunaite	Lithuania	57.51	Q
17	1	5	Laura Sotomayor	Spain	57.54	
18	4	4	Lucie Slanícková	Slovakia	57.56	
19	3	7	Olena Kolesnychenko	Ukraine	58.04	
20	1	7	Angela Moroșanu	Romania	58.11	
21	4	2	Robine Schürmann	Switzerland	58.16	
22	1	3	Vilde Jakobsen Svortevik	Norway	58.26	SB
23	3	3	Hanne Claes	Belgium	1:00.20	
24	3	5	Maris Mägi	Estonia	1:03.04	
	2	4	Sara Petersen	Denmark		DQ
	2	6	Hanna Ryzhykova	Ukraine		DQ

=== Semifinal ===
Rank	Heat	Lane	Name	Nationality	Time	Note
1	2	3	Eilidh Child	Great Britain	54.71	Q
2	1	5	Anna Titimets	Ukraine	54.90	Q, SB
3	2	6	Denisa Rosolová	Czech Republic	54.96	Q
4	2	4	Axelle Dauwens	Belgium	55.63	Q, PB
5	1	7	Irina Davydova	Russia	55.69	Q
6	2	5	Joanna Linkiewicz	Poland	55.89	q, PB
7	2	8	Vera Rudakova	Russia	55.98	q
8	1	8	Yadisleidy Pedroso	Italy	56.07	Q
9	1	6	Christiane Klopsch	Germany	56.28	
10	1	4	Vera Barbosa	Portugal	56.33	
11	2	1	Egle Staisiunaite	Lithuania	56.39	PB
12	1	1	Stina Troest	Denmark	56.81	
13	1	2	Līga Velvere	Latvia	56.87	PB
14	2	2	Valentine Arrieta	Switzerland	57.00	
15	2	7	Christine McMahon	Ireland	57.31	
16	1	3	Petra Fontanive	Switzerland	57.53	

=== Final ===
Rank	Lane	Name	Nationality	Time	Note
1st place, gold medalist(s)	3	Eilidh Child	Great Britain	54.48	
2nd place, silver medalist(s)	6	Anna Titimets	Ukraine	54.56	PB
3rd place, bronze medalist(s)	5	Irina Davydova	Russia	54.60	SB
4	4	Denisa Rosolová	Czech Republic	54.70	
5	7	Yadisleidy Pedroso	Italy	55.90	
6	2	Vera Rudakova	Russia	56.22	
7	8	Axelle Dauwens	Belgium	56.29	
8	1	Joanna Linkiewicz	Poland	56.59	
