= Benedicte Hauge =

Norwegian sprinter (born 1989)

Personal information
- Born: 19 January 1989 (age 37)

Sport
- Country: Norway
- Sport: Track and field
- Event: 400 metres

Benedicte Hauge (born 19 January 1989) is a Norwegian sprinter who specializes in the 400 metres, and formerly also the 400 metres hurdles.

She competed at the 2006 World Junior Championships, the 2007 European Junior Championships, the 2008 World Junior Championships (both 400 and 400 hurdles), the 2009 European U23 Championships (only 400 hurdles), the 2011 European U23 Championships and the 2016 European Championships without reaching the final.

She has also competed in the 4 x 400 metres relay at the 2011 European U23 Championships, finishing seventh, and the 2016 European Championships, where the team was knocked out, but set a new Norwegian record of 3:31.73 minutes.

Domestically, Hauge has won two Norwegian championship titles, in the 400 metres in 2006 and the 400 metres hurdles in 2008. She represented Kristiansands IF until switching to IK Tjalve in 2016.

Her personal best time is 53.13 seconds, achieved in the heats at the 2016 European Championships. In the hurdles her personal best is 58.46 seconds, achieved at the 2008 Norwegian championships in Trondheim.
