= Axelle Dauwens =

Belgian hurdler

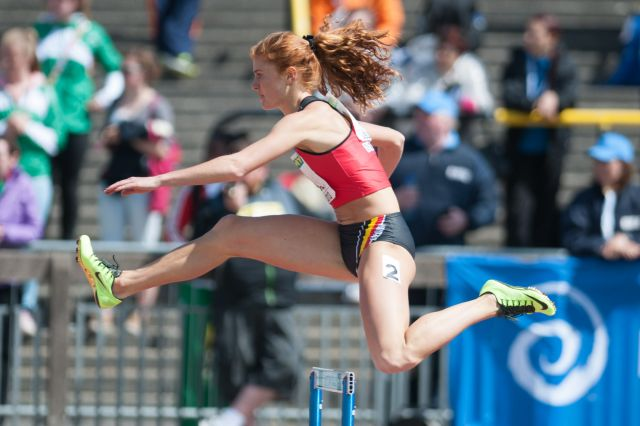
- Axelle Dauwens in 2013.

Personal information
- Born: December 1, 1990 (age 35) Knokke, Belgium
- Education: University of Ghent
- Height: 1.71 m (5 ft 7 1/2 in)
- Weight: 62 kg (137 lb)

Sport
- Country: Belgium
- Sport: Track and field
- Event: 400m hurdles
- Club: AC Meetjesland
- Coached by: Philip Gilson (2007–); Mikkel Larsen

Axelle Dauwens (born 1 December 1990, in Knokke) is a Belgian athlete who specialises in the 400 metres hurdles. She represented her country at the 2013 World Championships without qualifying for the semifinals. She made her first major final at the 2014 European Championships finishing seventh.

Her personal best in the event is 55.56, set in Brussels in 2014.

== Competition record ==
Year	Competition	Venue	Position	Event	Notes
Representing the Belgium
2010	European Championships	Barcelona, Spain	13th (h)	4 × 400 m relay	3:37.56
2011	European U23 Championships	Ostrava, Czech Republic	11th (h)	400 m	54.01
2011	Universiade	Shenzhen, China	18th (h)	400 m hurdles	59.61
2012	European Championships	Helsinki, Finland	17th (h)	400 m hurdles	57.19
2013	Universiade	Kazan, Russia	8th (h)	400 m hurdles	57.53
2013	World Championships	Moscow, Russia	21st (h)	400 m hurdles	56.85
2014	European Championships	Zürich, Switzerland	7th	400 m hurdles	56.29
2015	World Championships	Beijing, China	12th (sf)	400 m hurdles	55.82
2016	European Championships	Amsterdam, Netherlands	13th (sf)	400 m hurdles	56.62
2016	Olympic Games	Rio de Janeiro, Brazil	36th (h)	400 m hurdles	57.68
