= Leah Nugent =

American-born Jamaican hurdler

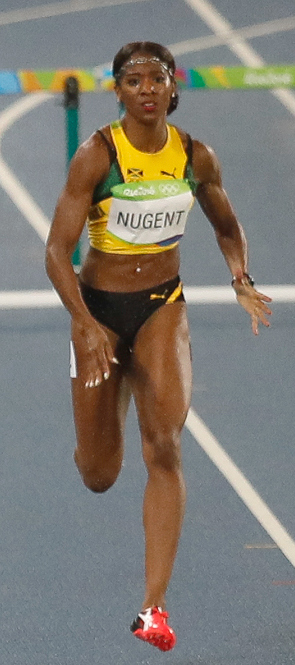
- Nugent at the 2016 Olympics

Personal information
- Born: 23 November 1992 (age 33) Abington, Pa
- Education: University of Kentucky
- Height: 1.73 m (5 ft 8 in)
- Weight: 66 kg (146 lb)

Sport
- Country: Jamaica
- Sport: Track and Field
- Event: Hurdles

Achievements and titles
- Personal bests: 100 mH – 13.11 (2015); 400 mH – 54.45 (2016)

Leah Nugent (born 23 November 1992) is a hurdles runner from Jamaica. She was born in Pennsylvania, USA, with strong family heritage ties to Jamaica, from her father and paternal grandparents. Her father moved to the United States before having Leah. Leah is a University of Kentucky graduate, having also competed for and later served as a volunteer coach for the Kentucky Wildcats track and field team. Leah notes that it has always been her heart to represent Jamaica, because her father is from there along with her other immediate family.

Leah switched her allegiance from the United States of America to Jamaica in 2016, in which at that point she finished third at the Jamaica National Senior Championships which resulted in her acceptance into the 2016 Summer Olympics. She placed sixth in the 400 metres hurdles event at the 2016 Summer Olympics, setting a personal record.

== Progression - Outdoor ==
100 Metres Hurdles
Date	Performance	Wind	Place
24 April 2011	13.64	-1.0	Greensboro, NC
26 April 2014	13.29	-0.3	Philadelphia, PA
17 June 2015	13.11	+1.2	Gainesville, FL

400 Metre Hurdles
Date	Performance	Place
23 April 2009	1:00.05	Philadelphia, PA
22 April 2010	59.15	Philadelphia, PA
18 June 2011	57.72	Greensboro, NC
16 May 2014	56.97	Lexington, KY
1 August 2015	55.63	Atlanta (Emory University), GA
18 August 2016	54.45	Rio de Janeiro (Estadio Olimpico)
23 June 2017	54.45	Kingston (NS), JAM

== Progression - Indoor ==
60 Metres
Date	Performance	Place
16 January 2016	7.39	Lexington, KY

400 Metres
Date	Performance	Place
5 February 2016	53.09	Blacksburg, VA

60 Metres Hurdles
Date	Performance	Place
1 March 2014	8.20	College Station, TX
13 February 2015	8.22	Fayetteville, AR
21 January 2017	7.96	Lexington, KY

== International competitions ==
Year	Competition	Venue	Position	Event	Notes
Representing Jamaica
2016	Olympic Games	Rio de Janeiro, Brazil	6th	400 m hurdles	54.45
2017	World Championships	London, United Kingdom	14th (sf)	400 m hurdles	56.19
2018	NACAC Championships	Toronto, Canada	5th	400 m hurdles	55.74
2021	Olympic Games	Tokyo, Japan	–	400 m hurdles	DQ
