= Zuzana Bergrová =

Czech printer and hurdler

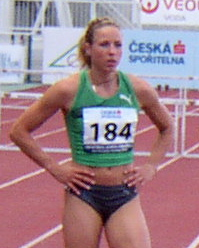
- Zuzana Bergrová in 2010

Personal information
- Born: 24 November 1984 (age 41) Ústí nad Labem, Czechoslovakia
- Height: 1.75 m (5 ft 9 in)
- Weight: 64 kg (141 lb)

Sport
- Country: Czech Republic
- Sport: Athletics
- Event: 4 × 400m Relay
Medal record
World Indoor Championships
Silver medal – second place	2010 Doha	4x400

Zuzana Bergrová (Czech pronunciation: [ˈzuzana ˈbɛrɡrovaː]; born 24 November 1984) is a Czech sprinter and hurdler.

== Personal bests ==
Event	Time (sec)	Venue	Date
200 metres	24.25	Prague, Czech Republic	6 June 2010
400 metres	53.05	Ostrava, Czech Republic	27 May 2010
400 metres hurdles	55.96	Biberach, Germany	9 July 2010

== Achievements ==
Year	Competition	Venue	Position	Event	Notes
2006	European Championships	Gothenburg, Sweden	31st (h)	400 m hurdles	58.64
2006	European Championships	Gothenburg, Sweden	10th (h)	4 × 400 m relay	3:34.47
2008	World Indoor Championships	Valencia, Spain	4th	4 × 400 m relay	3:34.53
2010	World Indoor Championships	Doha, Qatar	2nd	4 × 400 m relay	3:30.05
2010	European Championships	Barcelona, Spain	15th (sf)	400 m hurdles	57.41
2010	European Championships	Barcelona, Spain	10th (h)	4 × 400 m relay	3:31.91
2011	Universiade	Shenzhen, China	15th (h)	400 m hurdles	58.16
2011	World Championships	Daegu, South Korea	7th	4 × 400 m relay	3:26.57
2012	European Championships	Helsinki, Finland	7th	400 m hurdles	56.26
2012	Olympic Games	London, United Kingdom	7th	4 × 400 m relay	3:27.77
