= 2009 European Athletics U23 Championships – Women's 400 metres hurdles =

The women's 400 metres hurdles event at the 2009 European Athletics U23 Championships was held in Kaunas, Lithuania, at S. Dariaus ir S. Girėno stadionas (Darius and Girėnas Stadium) on 16, 17, and 18 July.

== Medalists ==
Gold	Perri Shakes-Drayton; United Kingdom
Silver	Eilidh Child; United Kingdom
Bronze	Darya Korableva; Russia

== Results ==
=== Final ===
18 July

Rank	Name	Nationality	Time	Notes
1st place, gold medalist(s)	Perri Shakes-Drayton	United Kingdom	55.26	
2nd place, silver medalist(s)	Eilidh Child	United Kingdom	55.32	
3rd place, bronze medalist(s)	Darya Korableva	Russia	56.08	
4	Hanna Titimets	Ukraine	56.27	
5	Irina Davydova	Russia	56.75	
6	Sara Petersen	Denmark	56.77	
7	Tina Polak	Poland	56.88	
8	Anna Yaroshchuk	Ukraine	57.26	

=== Semifinals ===
17 July
Qualified: first 3 in each heat and 2 best to the Final

==== Semifinal 1 ====
Rank	Name	Nationality	Time	Notes
1	Perri Shakes-Drayton	United Kingdom	55.84	Q
2	Darya Korableva	Russia	56.12	Q
3	Tina Polak	Poland	56.54	Q
4	Anna Yaroshchuk	Ukraine	57.23	q
5	Fabienne Kohlmann	Germany	57.55	
6	Jill Richards	Germany	58.06	
7	Frida Persson	Sweden	58.27	
8	Cécile Bernaleau	France	58.54	

==== Semifinal 2 ====
Rank	Name	Nationality	Time	Notes
1	Eilidh Child	United Kingdom	56.45	Q
2	Hanna Titimets	Ukraine	56.71	Q
3	Irina Davydova	Russia	57.05	Q
4	Sara Petersen	Denmark	57.08	q
5	Meghan Beesley	United Kingdom	57.32	
6	Katarzyna Janecka	Poland	58.00	
7	Laetitia Denis	France	58.04	
8	Kristina Volfová	Czech Republic	58.80	

=== Heats ===
16 July
Qualified: first 3 in each heat and 4 best to the Semifinal

==== Heat 1 ====
Rank	Name	Nationality	Time	Notes
1	Meghan Beesley	United Kingdom	57.91	Q
2	Hanna Titimets	Ukraine	58.85	Q
3	Irina Davydova	Russia	58.95	Q
4	Hege Vold	Norway	59.57	
5	Lucie Perrin	France	59.87	
6	Sandra Jiménez	Spain	61.03	
7	Petra Fontanive	Switzerland	61.03	

==== Heat 2 ====
Rank	Name	Nationality	Time	Notes
1	Eilidh Child	United Kingdom	56.53	Q
2	Fabienne Kohlmann	Germany	57.81	Q
3	Anna Yaroshchuk	Ukraine	57.90	Q
4	Cécile Bernaleau	France	58.39	q
5	Marzena Kościelniak	Poland	58.80	
6	Ieva Ješkina	Latvia	60.76	
7	Kitti Zircher	Hungary	61.28	

==== Heat 3 ====
Rank	Name	Nationality	Time	Notes
1	Darya Korableva	Russia	56.71	Q
2	Sara Petersen	Denmark	57.20	Q
3	Katarzyna Janecka	Poland	57.41	Q
4	Kristina Volfová	Czech Republic	58.04	q
5	Frida Persson	Sweden	58.60	q
6	Benedicte Hauge	Norway	58.62	

==== Heat 4 ====
Rank	Name	Nationality	Time	Notes
1	Perri Shakes-Drayton	United Kingdom	57.35	Q
2	Tina Polak	Poland	57.95	Q
3	Jill Richards	Germany	58.42	Q
4	Laetitia Denis	France	58.55	q
5	Eglė Staišiūnaitė	Lithuania	60.32	
6	Noora Toivo	Finland	60.60	
7	Evelin Farsang	Hungary	61.09	

== Participation ==
According to an unofficial count, 27 athletes from 16 countries participated in the event.

- Czech Republic (1)
- Denmark (1)
- Finland (1)
- France (3)
- Germany (2)
- Hungary (2)
- Latvia (1)
- Lithuania (1)
- Norway (2)
- Poland (3)
- Russia (2)
- Spain (1)
- Sweden (1)
- Switzerland (1)
- Ukraine (2)
- United Kingdom (3)
