= Eglė Staišiūnaitė =

Lithuanian hurdler (born 1988)

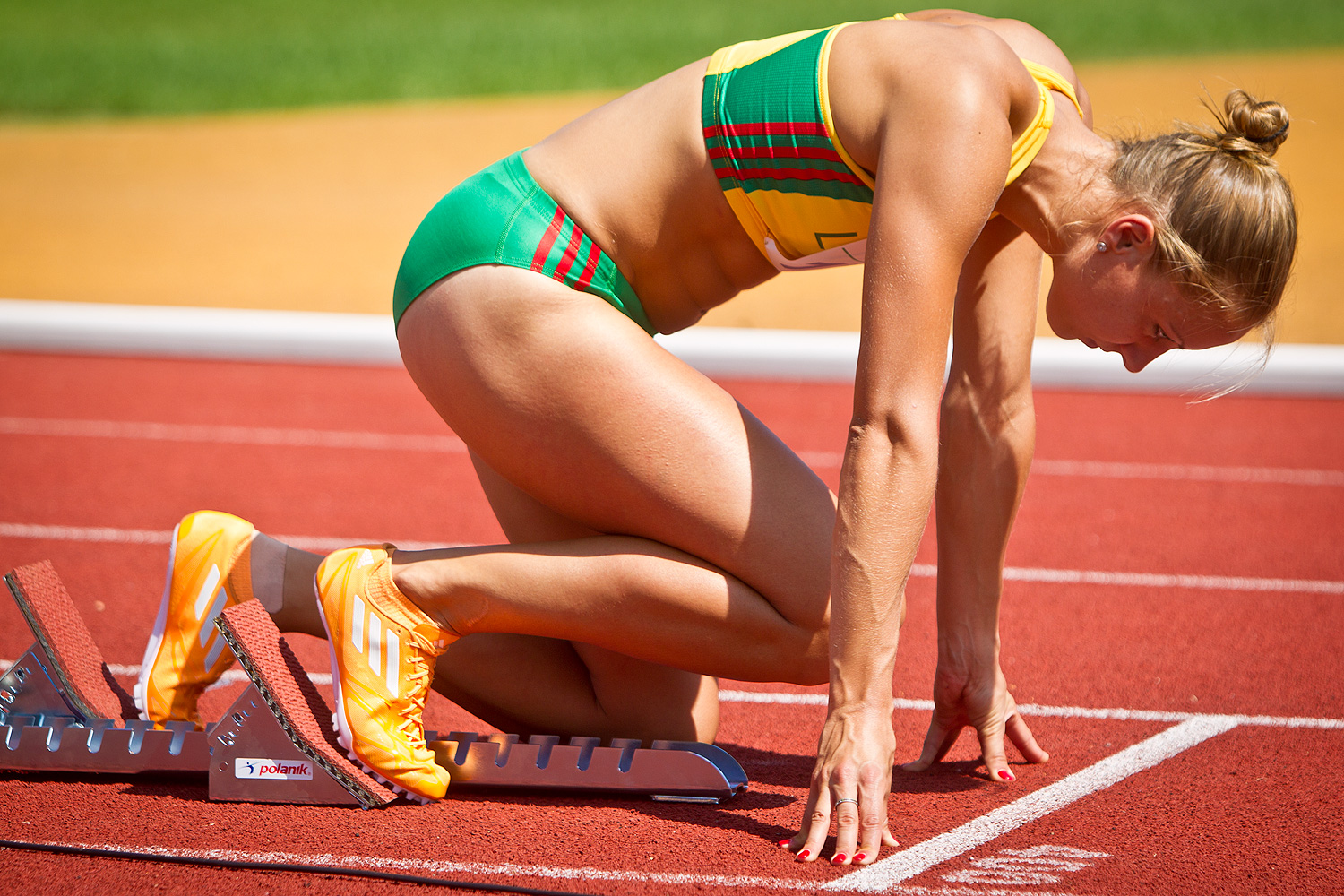

Personal information
- Born: 30 September 1988 (age 37) Klaipėda, Lithuanian SSR, Soviet Union
- Height: 1.74 m (5 ft 9 in)

Sport
- Country: Lithuania
- Sport: Athletics
- Event: 400 m hurdles

Achievements and titles
- Personal bests: 400 m hurdles: 56.17 (Beijing, August 2015)

Eglė Staišiūnaitė (born 30 September 1988) is a Lithuanian athlete who specialises in the 400 m hurdles.

== Career ==
Staišiūnaitė was born on 30 September 1988 in Klaipėda. Collegiately, Staišiūnaitė ran for the Wisconsin Badgers track and field team.

Staišiūnaitė competed in the 2012 European Championships in Athletics and reached 15th place in the 400 m hurdles. She has competed for Lithuania in the Olympics (2012) and World Championships (2015).

== Achievements ==
Year	Competition	Venue	Position	Event	Notes
Representing Lithuania
2009	European U23 Championships	Kaunas, Lithuania	21st (h)	400m hurdles	60.32
2009	European U23 Championships	Kaunas, Lithuania	9th (h)	4 × 400 m relay	3:40.69
2012	European Championships	Helsinki, Finland	15th (sf)	400 m hurdles	58.76
2012	Olympic Games	London, United Kingdom	33rd (h)	400 m hurdles	57.79
2013	Universiade	Kazan, Russia	13th (h)	400 m hurdles	59.99
2014	European Championships	Zurich, Switzerland	11th (sf)	400 m hurdles	56.39
2014	European Championships	Zurich, Switzerland	11th (h)	4 × 400 m relay	3:36.25
2015	World Championships	Beijing, China	22nd (sf)	400 m hurdles	56.48
