= Nagihan Karadere =

Turkish runner (born 1984)

Personal information
- Nationality: Turkey
- Born: 27 December 1984 (age 41) Kadirli, Osmaniye Province, Turkey
- Height: 172 cm (5 ft 8 in)
- Weight: 65 kg (143 lb)

Sport
- Sport: Running
- Event: 400 metres
- Club: Botaşspor Club
- Coached by: Muharrem Or

Achievements and titles
- Personal bests: 400 m 54.82 (2006); 400 m hurdles 55.09 NR (2011)
Medal record
Women's athletics
Representing Turkey
Universiade
Silver medal – second place	2011 Shenzhen	4x400 m relay
Bronze medal – third place	2011 Shenzhen	400 m hurdles

Nagihan Karadere (born 27 December 1984) is a Turkish short-distance and hurdles runner. She is the first and only female athlete to run under 56sec in the 400m hurdles. Turkey's record rating in the 400m hurdles is 55.09 seconds. She competed in the Olympics, passing the threshold at the 2012 London Olympics.

She won a bronze medal in the 400 m hurdles event at the 2011 Summer Universiade held in Shenzhen, China and a silver medal in the 4 × 400 m relay event at the same competition.

Karadere set a new national record in 400 m hurdles event at the Turkish Super League Final held on July 31, 2011, in Ankara.

She qualified for participation in 400 m hurdles event at the 2012 Summer Olympics, where she was disqualified for a false start. She was a contestant in Turkish Survivor in 2016 in the Dominican Republic, and appeared in Survivor again in 2022, 2024 and 2026.

== Achievements ==
Year	Competition	Venue	Position	Event	Notes
Representing Turkey
2011	Summer Universiade	Shenzhen, China	3rd	400 m hurdles	55.81
2011	Summer Universiade	Shenzhen, China	2nd	4 × 400 m relay	3:30.14
2011	World Championships	Daegu, South Korea	26th (h)	400 m hurdles	56.76
2011	World Championships	Daegu, South Korea	15th (h)	4 × 400 m relay	3:32.15

== Competitions ==
Year	Competition	Results
2016	Survivor Ünlüler-Volunteers	5th
2018	Survivor 2018: Ünlüler-Volunteers Allstar	2nd
2022	Survivor All Star	6th
