= Sema Aydemir =

Turkish sprinter (born 1985)

Personal information
- Nationality: Turkish
- Born: Sema Aydemir; 17 August 1985 (age 40) Bursa, Turkey
- Height: 1.69 m (5 ft 7 in)
- Weight: 54 kg (119 lb)

Sport
- Country: Turkey
- Sport: Athletics
- Event: 400m hurdles
- Club: Enkaspor
- Coached by: Tayfun Aygün

Achievements and titles
- Personal best: 400m hurdles: 56.62 (2012)
Medal record
Women's athletics
Representing Turkey
Islamic Solidarity Games
Gold medal – first place	2013 Palembang	4x100 m relay
Silver medal – second place	2013 Palembang	4x400 m relay
Bronze medal – third place	2013 Palembang	Long jump
Mediterranean Games
Silver medal – second place	2013 Mersin	4x400 m relay

Sema Aydemir (born 17 August 1985) is a Turkish female sprinter, who is specializes in the 400m hurdles event. The 1.69 m (5 ft 7 in) tall athlete at 54 kg (119 lb) is a member of Enkaspor, where she is coached by Tayfun Aygün.

== Career ==
In her early years she competed in the heptathlon event. Sema Apak qualified for participation in the 4 × 400 m relay event at the 2012 Summer Olympics.

Her personal best time in the 400m hurdles is 56.62 scored 2012 in Ankara, Turkey.

She is married to Olympic bronze medalist hammer thrower Eşref Apak. The couple has a son named Ali. They divorced in 2016 by agreement.

At the 2013 Islamic Solidarity Games held in Palembang, Indonesia, she won a gold medal in the 4x100 event with teammates Saliha Özyurt, Birsen Engin and Nimet Karakuş, a silver medal in the 4x400 event with teammates Özge Akın, Birsen Engin and Esma Aydemir as well as a bronze medal in the long jump event.

== Achievements ==
Year	Competition	Venue	Position	Event	Notes
Representing Turkey
2005	European Cup Combined Events 2nd League	Maribor, Slovenia	22nd	Heptathlon	4399
2006	European Cup Combined Events 2nd League	Monzón, Spain	19th	Heptathlon	4607
2009	European Cup Combined Events 2nd League	Maribor, Slovenia	19th	Heptathlon	4514
2011	Summer Universiade	Shenzhen, China	11th	400m hurdles	57.53
2011	European Team Championships 1st League	İzmir, Turkey		4 × 100 m relay	44.71 NR
2012	21st European Championships	Helsinki, Finland	26th round 1	400m hurdles	58.93
2012	21st European Championships	Helsinki, Finland	11th round 1	4 × 400 m relay	3:34.70
2013	17th Mediterranean Games	Mersin, Turkey	2nd	4x400 relay	3:43.61
2013	3rd Islamic Games	Palembang, Indonesia	3rd	Long jump	5.71 m
2013	3rd Islamic Games	Palembang, Indonesia	2nd	4x400 relay	3:53.26
2013	3rd Islamic Games	Palembang, Indonesia	1st	4x100 relay	46.59
