= Yevgeniya Subbotina =

Russian middle-distance runner

Personal information
- Born: 30 October 1989 (age 36)

Sport
- Country: Russia
- Sport: Track and field
- Event: 800 metres

Yevgeniya Subbotina (born 30 October 1989) is a Russian middle-distance runner. She competed in the 800 metres event at the 2015 World Championships in Athletics in Beijing, China.
