= Meghan Beesley =

English hurdler (born 1989)

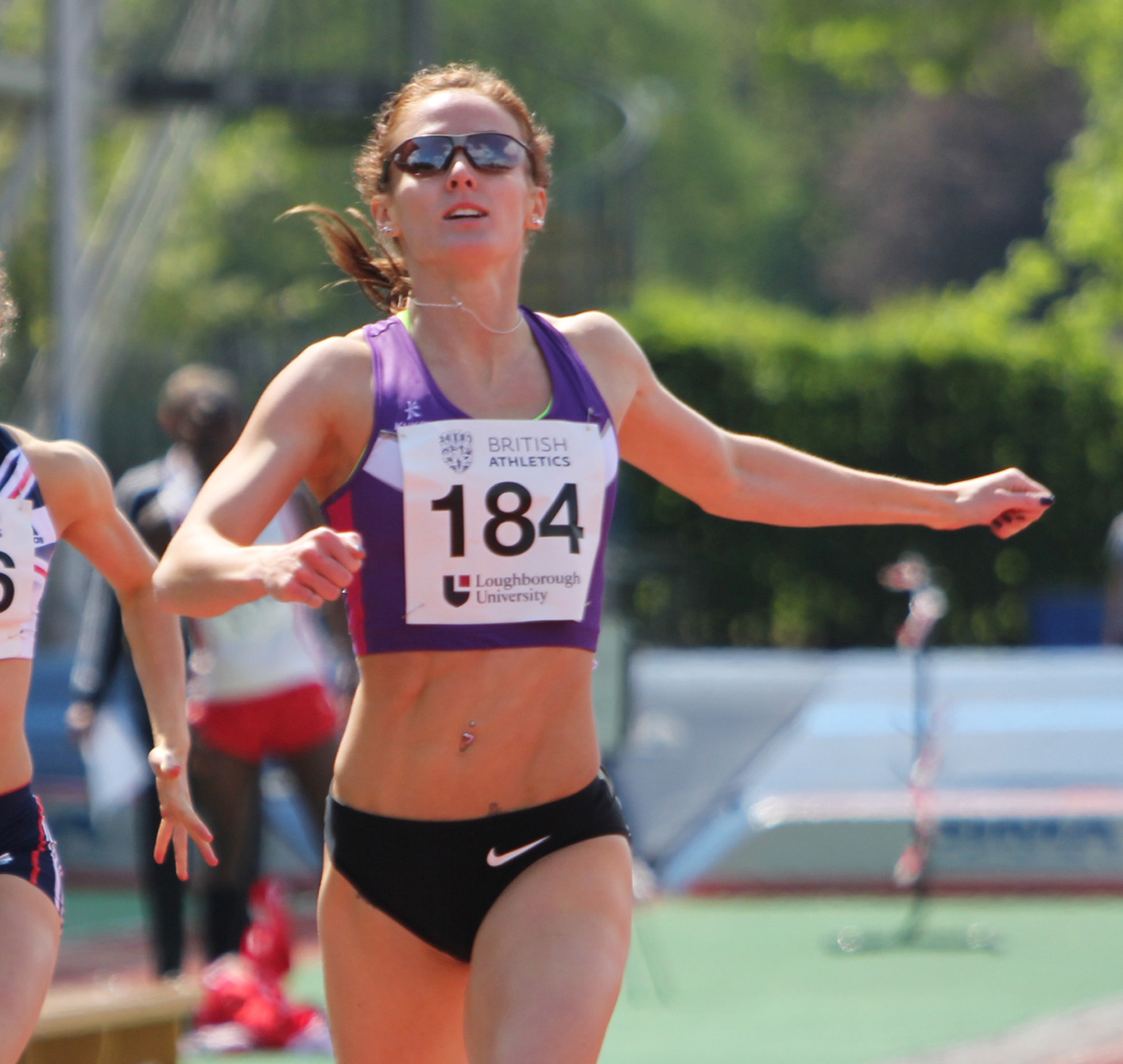
- Meghan Beesley during the 2013 Loughborough International Athletics

Personal information
- Nationality: British
- Born: 15 November 1989 (age 36) Polesworth, Warwickshire, England
- Education: Loughborough University
- Height: 1.67 m (5 ft 6 in)
- Weight: 56 kg (123 lb)

Sport
- Sport: Athletics
- Event: 400 metres
- Club: Birchfield Harriers
- Coached by: Benke Blomkvist
Medal record
World Indoor Championships
Bronze medal – third place	2018 Birmingham	4×400 m
European Championships
Bronze medal – third place	2018 Berlin	400 m Hurdles
Athletics World Cup
Silver medal – second place	2018 London	400 m Hurdles

Meghan Beesley (born 15 November 1989) is an English track and field athlete specialising in the 400 metres hurdles. She competed at the 2013 World Championships narrowly missing the final. Earlier in her career, she also competed in the heptathlon. Beesley broke the world record for the rarely contested straight 200 metres hurdles by 0.69 seconds at the 2014 Great City Games in Manchester.

== Competition record ==
Year	Competition	Venue	Position	Event	Notes
Representing Great Britain and England
2007	European Junior Championships	Kaunas, Lithuania	6th	400 m hurdles	58.76
2007	European Junior Championships	Kaunas, Lithuania	2nd	4 × 400 m relay	3:37.29
2008	World Junior Championships	Bydgoszcz, Poland	3rd	400 m hurdles	57.08
2009	European U23 Championships	Kaunas, Lithuania	11th (sf)	400 m hurdles	57.32
2010	Commonwealth Games	Delhi, India	7th	400 m hurdles	58.36
2010	Commonwealth Games	Delhi, India	2nd	4 × 400 m relay	3:29.51
2011	European U23 Championships	Ostrava, Czech Republic	3rd	400 m hurdles	55.69
2011	Universiade	Shenzhen, China	8th	400 m hurdles	59.21
2011	Universiade	Shenzhen, China	3rd	4 × 400 m relay	3:33.09
2012	European Championships	Helsinki, Finland	14th (sf)	400 m hurdles	57.32
2013	World Championships	Moscow, Russia	9th (sf)	400 m hurdles	54.97
2015	World Championships	Beijing, China	10th (sf)	400 m hurdles	55.41
2017	World Championships	London, United Kingdom	20th (sf)	400 m hurdles	56.61
2018	World Indoor Championships	Birmingham, United Kingdom	3rd	4 × 400 m relay	3:29.38
2018	Commonwealth Games	Gold Coast, Australia	11th (h)	400 m hurdles	56.41
2018	Athletics World Cup	London, United Kingdom	2nd	400 m Hurdles	55.90
2018	European Championships	Berlin, Germany	3rd	400 m hurdles	55.34
2019	World Championships	Doha, Qatar	24th (sf)	400 m hurdles	56.89
2021	Olympic Games	Tokyo, Japan	26th (h)	400 m hurdles	55.91

== Personal bests ==
- 200 metres – 23.53 (Birmingham 2015)
- 400 metres – 52.79 (La Chaux-de-Fonds 2011)
- 100 metres hurdles – 13.21 (Loughborough 2015)
- 400 metres hurdles – 54.52 (Beijing 2015)

Indoor

- 200 metres – 23.56 (Birmingham, UK 2018)
- 400 metres – 52.80 (Vienna 2013)
