= Irina Davydova =

Russian hurdler (born 1988)

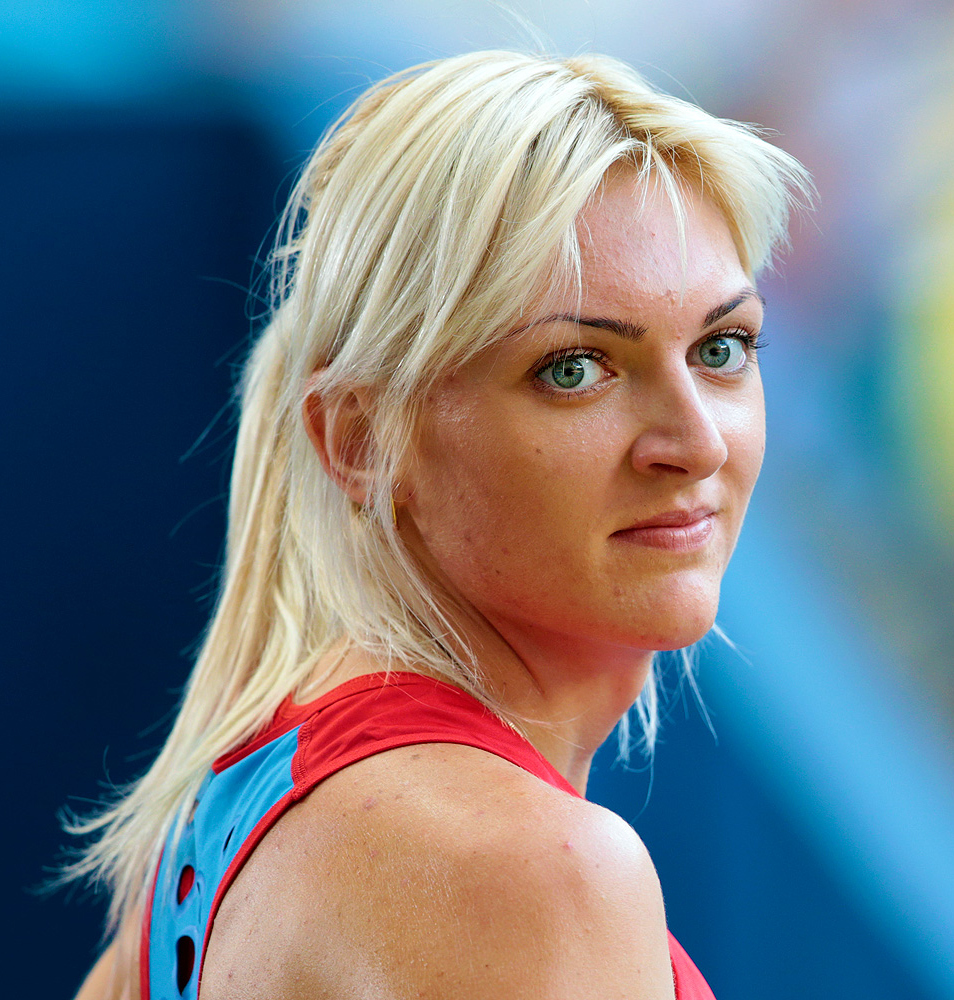

Personal information
- Born: 27 May 1988 (age 38) Soviet Union
- Height: 1.7 m (5 ft 7 in)
- Weight: 65 kg (143 lb)

Sport
- Country: Russia
- Sport: Athletics
- Event: 400 metres hurdles
Medal record
Women's athletics
Representing Russia
European Athletics Championships
| Disqualified | 2012 Helsinki | 400 m hurdles |
| Disqualified | 2014 Zürich | 400 m hurdles |

Irina Andreyevna Davydova (Russian: Ирина Андреевна Давыдова; born 27 May 1988, Alexandrov) is a Russian athlete who competes in the 400 metres hurdles with a personal best time of 53.77 seconds.

Davydova won the gold medal at the 2012 European Athletics Championships in Helsinki but was stripped of her medal in 2022 as well as all her results from 20 June 2012 to 30 June 2015.

== Biography ==
She began running in her home town of Alexandrov at the age of 12, under the tutelage her coach Aleksandr Sychev. Her parents were cross-country skiers.

At junior level, she won no national championships, but did represent her club, Luch Moscow, at two European Junior Champion Clubs Cups, winning gold on both occasions.

Her breakthrough came at under-23 level, when she won gold in the 400 m hurdles in 2009 in a time of 56.14. This led to her representing Russia at the 2009 U23 European Championships. Following this, she moved to Moscow and was coached by Nikolay Chemerisov. In 2010, she competed in the Russian senior nationals, finishing in seventh. The next year, she improved to bronze, with a new personal best of 55.48. Because she didn't run a fast enough time to compete at the World Championships, she was instead sent to the 2011 Universiade, where she won silver.

In 2012, she ran the 400 m without hurdles during the indoor season, qualifying for the World Indoor Championships. Her increased flat speed helped at the European Championships that year, where she won the gold medal in the 400 m hurdles, setting a new personal best.

She studied law at the Modern Academy of Humanities.

== Competition record ==
Representing Russia
| Year | Competition | Venue | Position | Event | Notes |
|---|---|---|---|---|---|
| 2009 | European U23 Championships | Kaunas, Lithuania | 5th | 400m hurdles | 56.75 |
| 2011 | Universiade | Shenzhen, China | 2nd | 400 m hurdles | 55.50 |
| 2012 | World Indoor Championships | Istanbul, Turkey | 10th (sf) | 400 m | 53.02 |
| 2012 | European Championships | Helsinki, Finland | DQ | 400 m hurdles | 53.77 |
| 2013 | Universiade | Kazan, Russia | DQ | 400 m hurdles | 54.79 |
| 2014 | European Championships | Zürich, Switzerland | DQ | 400 m hurdles | 54.60 |
