= Hanna Titimets =

Ukrainian hurdler (born 1989)

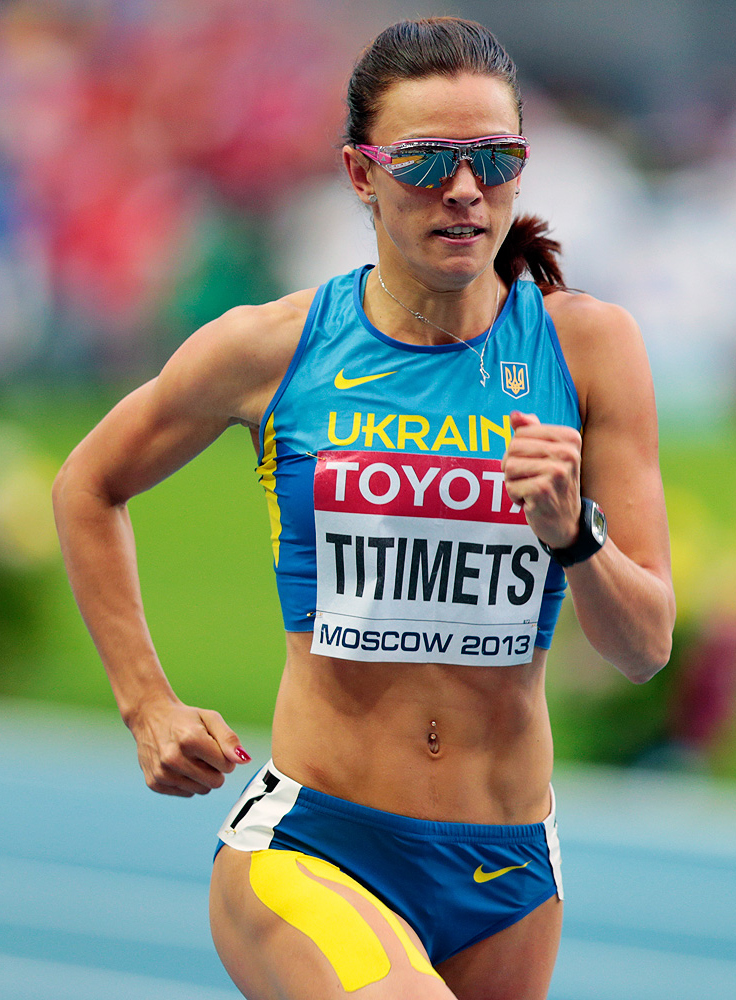
- Hanna Titimets at 2013 World Championships in Athletics

Personal information
- Born: March 5, 1989 (age 37) Pavlohrad, Soviet Union
- Education: Ternopil National Economic University
- Height: 1.73 m (5 ft 8 in)
- Weight: 64 kg (141 lb)

Sport
- Country: Ukraine
- Sport: Athletics
- Events: 400 metres hurdles, 4 × 400 metres relay
- Club: Armed Forces
- Coached by: Kürşad ÇALIŞKAN
Medal record
Women's athletics
Representing Ukraine
European Team Championships
Silver medal – second place	2015 Cheboksary	400 m hurdles
European Championships
Silver medal – second place	2014 Zürich	400 m hurdles
Universiade
Gold medal – first place	2011 Shenzhen	4 × 100 metres relay
Gold medal – first place	2013 Kazan	400 m hurdles
European U23 Championships
Silver medal – second place	2011 Ostrava	400 m hurdles
European Junior Championships
Silver medal – second place	2007 Hengelo	4×100 m relay

Hanna Serhiyivna Titimets (Ukrainian: Анна (Ганна) Сергіївна Тітімець; born 5 March 1989) is a Ukrainian hurdler.

== Career ==
She represented her country at the 2012 and 2016 Summer Olympics narrowly missing the final on both occasions. In addition, she competed at two World Championships, in 2011 and 2013. Titimets won the silver medal at the 2014 European Championships.

She was sanctioned based on irregularities in her athlete biological passport and received a 2-year ban starting on 3 April 2017. In addition, all her results between 26 June 2012 and 26 June 2014 were voided.

== Competition record ==
Year	Competition	Venue	Position	Event	Notes
Representing Ukraine
2007	European Junior Championships	Hengelo, Netherlands	8th	400 m hurdles	61.50
2007	European Junior Championships	Hengelo, Netherlands	2nd	4 × 100 m relay	44.77
2008	World Junior Championships	Bydgoszcz, Poland	4th	400 m hurdles	57.22
2009	European U23 Championships	Kaunas, Lithuania	4th	400 m hurdles	56.27
2009	European U23 Championships	Kaunas, Lithuania	4th	4 × 400 m relay	3:30.78
2009	World Championships	Berlin, Germany	31st (h)	400 m hurdles	58.22
2010	European Championships	Barcelona, Spain	10th (sf)	400 m hurdles	55.84
2010	European Championships	Barcelona, Spain	5th	4 × 400 m relay	3:28.03
2011	European Indoor Championships	Paris, France	8th (sf)	400 m	53.97
2011	European Indoor Championships	Paris, France	6th	4 × 400 m relay	3:34.08
2011	European U23 Championships	Ostrava, Czech Republic	2nd	400 m hurdles	54.91
2011	Universiade	Shenzhen, China	9th (h)	400 m hurdles	57.20
2011	Universiade	Shenzhen, China	1st	4 × 100 m relay	43.33
2011	World Championships	Daegu, South Korea	14th (sf)	400 m hurdles	55.82
2012	European Championships	Helsinki, Finland	13th (sf)	400 m hurdles	57.26
2012	Olympic Games	London, United Kingdom	9th (sf)	400 m hurdles	55.10
2013	Universiade	Kazan, Russia	1st	400 m hurdles	54.64
2013	World Championships	Moscow, Russia	4th	400 m hurdles	54.72
2014	European Championships	Zürich, Switzerland	2nd	400 m hurdles	54.56 (PB)
2016	European Championships	Amsterdam, Netherlands	10th (sf)	400 m hurdles	56.18
2016	Olympic Games	Rio de Janeiro, Brazil	9th (sf)	400 m hurdles	55.27
