= Sarah Wells =

Track and field athlete

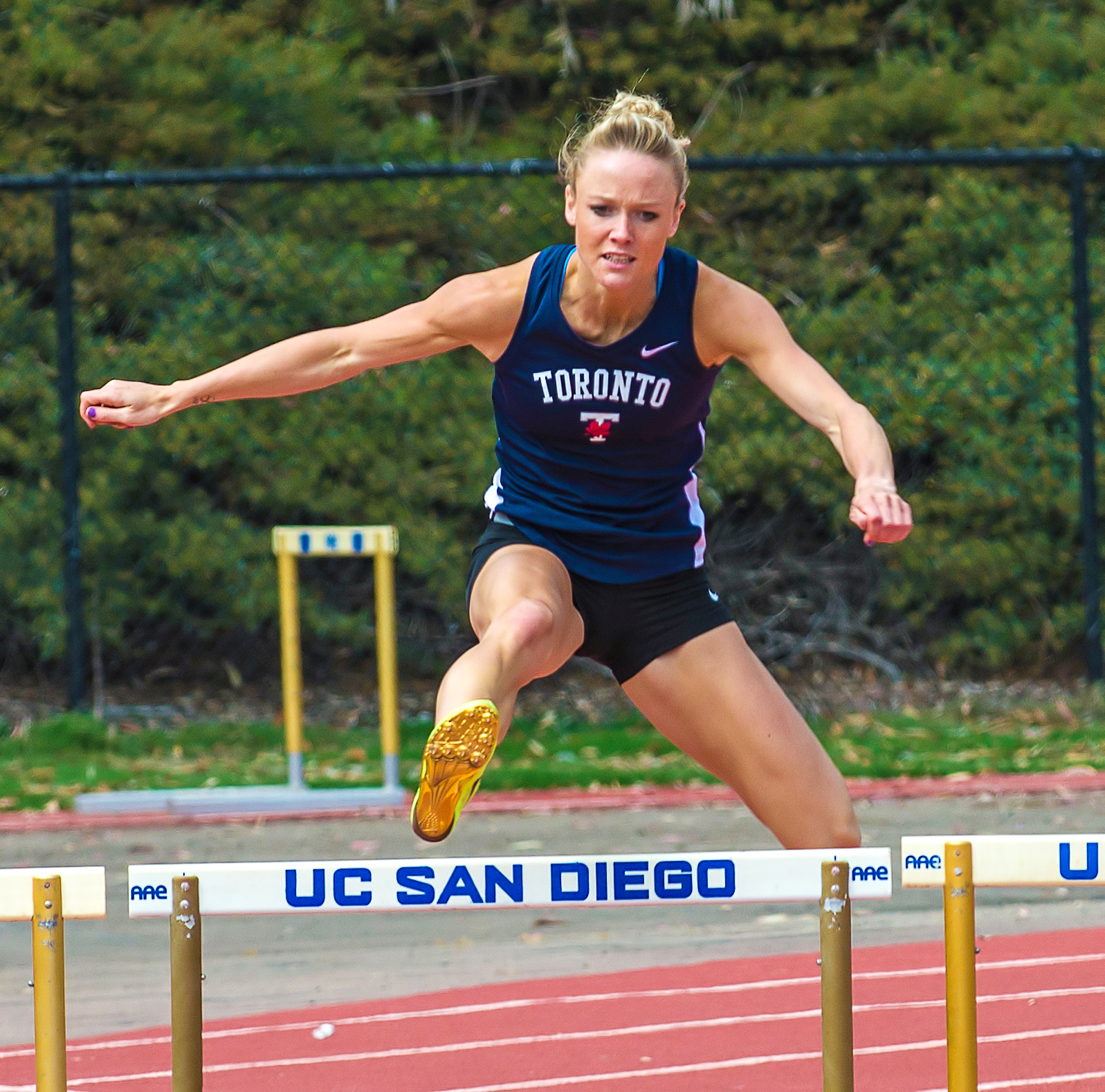
- Sarah Wells in 2013

Personal information
- Born: November 10, 1989 (age 37) Markham, Ontario, Canada
- Height: 1.67 m (5 ft 6 in)
- Weight: 50 kg (110 lb)

Sport
- Sport: Track & field
- Event: 400 m hurdles
- College team: Toronto Varsity Blues

Achievements and titles
- Personal best: 55.65 (Luzern (SUI) 2013)
Medal record
Representing Canada
Women's athletics
Pan American Games
Silver medal – second place	2015 Toronto	400 m hurdles
Bronze medal – third place	2015 Toronto	4×400 m relay
Universiade
Silver medal – second place	2013 Kazan	4x400 metres relay
Bronze medal – third place	2013 Kazan	400 m hurdles

Sarah Wells (born November 10, 1989) is a Canadian hurdler who specializes in the 400 metres hurdles. She competed in the 2012 Olympic Games and finished 22nd over all. Wells won the silver medal in the 400 metres hurdles at the 2015 Pan American Games in Toronto, Ontario, Canada.

== Life ==
Wells was born on November 10, 1989, in Markham, Ontario, and she attended University of Toronto.

- Finished 24th, 400 meter hurdles at the 2012 London Olympic Games
- 1st 2007, 2010, 2012 and 2015 National Championships
- 2nd 400 m hurdles 2015 Pan American Games
- 3rd 400 m hurdles 2013 FISU Summer Universiade Kazan, Russia
- 6th 400 m hurdles, 2008 IAAF World Junior Championships
- Personal best: 55.65, Lucerne 17 July 2013
- Owned the Canadian Youth under-17 record of 59.48 seconds in the 400m hurdles in 2006.

== Filmography ==
=== Television ===
Year	Title	Role	Notes
2019	The Amazing Race Canada	Herself	2nd Place Alongside Sam Effah
