= Mila Andrić =

Serbian hurdler

Mila Andrićć Мила Андрић
Personal information
- Nationality: Serbian
- Born: 1 March 1990 (age 36) Belgrade, SR Serbia, Yugoslavia

Sport
- Sport: Track and field
- Event(s): 100 metres hurdles, 400 metres hurdles

Achievements and titles
- Personal best: 400 m hurdles: 57.55 (NR)
Medal record
Representing Serbia
European Junior Championships
Silver medal – second place	2009 Novi Sad	400m Hurdles
European Youth Olympic Festival
Gold medal – first place	2007 Belgrade	100m Hurdles
Silver medal – second place	2007 Belgrade	400m Hurdles

Mila Andrić (Serbian Cyrillic: Мила Андрић, born 1 March 1990 in Belgrade, SR Serbia, Yugoslavia) is a Serbian hurdler who specialises and holds the Serbian national record for the 400 metres hurdles.

== See also ==
- Serbian records in athletics
