= Jessie Barr =

Irish athlete

Jessie Barr MSc
Personal information
- Born: 24 July 1989 (age 36)
- Education: Sports Performance MSc; University of the West of England
- Height: 1.75 m (5 ft 9 in)
- Weight: 58 kg (128 lb)

Sport
- Country: Ireland
- Sport: Athletics
- Event(s): 4 × 400m Relay; 400 metres hurdles

Achievements and titles
- Personal best: 400m hurdles: 55.93 s

Jessie Barr (born 24 July 1989 in Waterford, Ireland) is an Irish athlete who competed at the 2012 Summer Olympics.

== Early life ==
Jessie is from Dunmore East in Waterford and she attended the local girls primary school, the Light of Christ National School. She also attended the Ursuline Convent (St Angela's School), Waterford. Her parents are Thomas and Martina Barr. She has a sister Becky and she is the older sister of hurdler Thomas Barr.

== Career ==
She currently lives in Limerick. She competed for Ireland in the London Olympics. In the 400 metres hurdles she has also been a European Athletics Championship Finalist, a World University Games Finalist and she is the Irish U23 Record holder.

She was forced to lay off her training in 2014 following a stress fracture to her foot so she finished her master's degree in Sports Psychology at the University of the West of England. She moved back to her training group in Limerick, Ireland in September 2014 and started her PhD in Sport Psychology.
