= 2010 European Athletics Championships – Women's 4 × 400 metres relay =

Women's 4 × 400 metres relay at the European Athletics Championships

The women's 4 × 400 metres relay at the 2010 European Athletics Championships was held at the Estadi Olímpic Lluís Companys on 31 July and 1 August.

== Medalists ==
Gold	Janin Lindenberg, Esther Cremer, Fabienne Kohlmann, Claudia Hoffmann; Germany (GER)
Silver	(United Kingdom) Nicola Sanders, Marilyn Okoro, Lee McConnell, Perri Shakes-Drayton; Great Britain (GBR)
Bronze	Chiara Bazzoni, Marta Milani, Maria Enrica Spacca, Libania Grenot; Italy (ITA)

== Records ==
Standing records prior to the 2010 European Athletics Championships
World record	Soviet Union; Tatyana Ledovskaya, Olga Nazarova; Mariya Pinigina, Olga Bryzgina	3:15.17	Seoul, South Korea	1 October 1988
European record	Soviet Union; Tatyana Ledovskaya, Olga Nazarova; Mariya Pinigina, Olga Bryzgina	3:15.17	Seoul, South Korea	1 October 1988
Championship record	East Germany; Kirsten Emmelmann, Sabine Busch; Petra Müller, Marita Koch	3:16.87	Stuttgart, West Germany	31 August 1986
World Leading	Russia; Ksenia Zadorina, Natalia Ivanova; Natalya Antyukh, Kseniya Ustalova	3:23.76	Bergen, Norway	20 June 2010
European Leading	Russia; Ksenia Zadorina, Natalya Ivanova; Natalya Antyukh, Kseniya Ustalova	3:23.76	Bergen, Norway	20 June 2010
Broken records during the 2010 European Athletics Championships
World Leading	Russia; Anastasiya Kapachinskaya, Antonina Krivoshapka; Kseniya Ustalova, Tatyana Firova	3:21.26	Barcelona, Spain	1 August 2010
European Leading	Russia; Anastasiya Kapachinskaya, Antonina Krivoshapka; Kseniya Ustalova, Tatyana Firova	3:21.26	Barcelona, Spain	1 August 2010

== Schedule ==
Date	Time	Round
31 July 2010	11:50	Round 1
1 August 2010	21:40	Final

== Results ==
=== Round 1 ===
First 3 in each heat (Q) and 2 best performers (q) advance to the Final.

==== Heat 1 ====
Rank	Lane	Nation	Athletes	React	Time	Notes
DQ	6	Russia	Natalya Nazarova, Kseniya Zadorina, Antonina Krivoshapka, Kseniya Ustalova	0.212	~~3:26.89~~	Q
1	3	Great Britain & N.I.	Nicola Sanders, Vicki Barr, Marilyn Okoro, Lee McConnell	0.204	3:28.01	Q
2	8	France	Marie-Angélique Lacordelle, Thélia Sigère, Laetitia Denis, Floria Gueï		3:29.25	Q
DQ	4	Belarus	Katsiaryna Mishyna, Alena Kievich, Hanna Tashpulatava, Sviatlana Usovich	0.300	~~3:29.27~~	q
DQ	5	Turkey	Özge Gürler, Birsen Engin, Meliz Redif, Pinar Saka	0.229	~~3:33.13~~	~~NR~~
3	2	Poland	Agata Bednarek, Izabela Kostruba-Rój, Aneta Jakóbczak, Anna Jesień	0.195	3:35.25	
4	7	Belgium	Axelle Dauwens, Elke Bogemans, Wendy Den Haeze, Lindsy Cozijns	0.214	3:37.56	

==== Heat 2 ====
Rank	Lane	Nation	Athletes	React	Time	Notes
1	5	Italy	Chiara Bazzoni, Marta Milani, Maria Enrica Spacca, Libania Grenot		3:27.95	Q
2	3	Germany	Janin Lindenberg, Esther Cremer, Jill Richards, Claudia Hoffmann	0.240	3:28.67	Q
3	7	Romania	Angela Moroșanu, Anamaria Ioniță, Bianca Răzor, Mirela Lavric	0.250	3:29.46	Q
4	2	Ukraine	Darya Prystupa, Yuliya Krevsun, Nataliya Lupu, Hanna Titimets	0.211	3:29.50	q
5	6	Ireland	Marian Andrews, Joanne Cuddihy, Brona Furlong, Michelle Carey	0.173	3:30.11	NR
6	4	Czech Republic	Jana Slaninová, Zuzana Bergrová, Jitka Bartoničková, Denisa Rosolová	0.356	3:31.91	
7	1	Slovenia	Anja Puc, Liona Rebernik, Daša Bajec, Urška Klemen	0.216	3:41.72	

==== Summary ====
Rank	Heat	Lane	Nation	Athletes	React	Time	Notes
DQ	1	6	Russia	Natalya Nazarova, Kseniya Zadorina, Antonina Krivoshapka, Kseniya Ustalova	0.212	~~3:26.89~~	~~Q~~
1	2	5	Italy	Chiara Bazzoni, Marta Milani, Maria Enrica Spacca, Libania Grenot		3:27.95	Q
2	1	3	Great Britain & N.I.	Nicola Sanders, Vicki Barr, Marilyn Okoro, Lee McConnell	0.204	3:28.01	Q
3	2	3	Germany	Janin Lindenberg, Esther Cremer, Jill Richards, Claudia Hoffmann	0.240	3:28.67	Q
4	1	8	France	Marie-Angélique Lacordelle, Thélia Sigère, Laetitia Denis, Floria Gueï		3:29.25	Q
DQ	1	4	Belarus	Katsiaryna Mishyna, Alena Kievich, Hanna Tashpulatava, Sviatlana Usovich	0.300	~~3:29.27~~	q
5	2	7	Romania	Angela Moroșanu, Anamaria Ioniță, Bianca Răzor, Mirela Lavric	0.250	3:29.46	Q
6	2	2	Ukraine	Darya Prystupa, Yuliya Krevsun, Nataliya Lupu, Hanna Titimets	0.211	3:29.50	q
7	2	6	Ireland	Marian Andrews, Joanne Cuddihy, Brona Furlong, Michelle Carey	0.173	3:30.11	NR
8	2	4	Czech Republic	Jana Slaninová, Zuzana Bergrová, Jitka Bartoničková, Denisa Rosolová	0.356	3:31.91	
DQ	1	5	Turkey	Özge Gürler, Birsen Engin, Meliz Redif, Pinar Saka	0.229	~~3:33.13~~	~~NR~~
9	1	2	Poland	Agata Bednarek, Izabela Kostruba-Rój, Aneta Jakóbczak, Anna Jesień	0.195	3:35.25	
10	1	7	Belgium	Axelle Dauwens, Elke Bogemans, Wendy Den Haeze, Lindsy Cozijns	0.214	3:37.56	
11	2	1	Slovenia	Anja Puc, Liona Rebernik, Daša Bajec, Urška Klemen	0.216	3:41.72	

=== Final ===
Rank	Lane	Nationality	Athlete	React	Time	Notes
DQ	4	Russia	Anastasiya Kapachinskaya, Antonina Krivoshapka, Kseniya Ustalova, Tatyana Firova	0.285	~~3:21.26~~	~~WL~~
1st place, gold medalist(s)	5	Germany	Fabienne Kohlmann, Esther Cremer, Janin Lindenberg, Claudia Hoffmann	0.194	3:24.07	
2nd place, silver medalist(s)	6	Great Britain & N.I.	Nicola Sanders, Marilyn Okoro, Lee McConnell, Perri Shakes-Drayton	0.246	3:24.32	
3rd place, bronze medalist(s)	3	Italy	Chiara Bazzoni, Marta Milani, Maria Enrica Spacca, Libania Grenot	0.272	3:25.71	NR
4	2	Ukraine	Darya Prystupa, Hanna Titimets, Alina Lohvychenko, Antonina Yefremova	0.283	3:28.03	
5	7	France	Marie-Angélique Lacordelle, Muriel Hurtis-Houairi, Thélia Sigère, Virginie Michanol		3:28.11	
DQ	1	Belarus	Katsiaryna Mishyna, Alena Kievich, Hanna Tashpulatava, Sviatlana Usovich	0.232	~~3:28.74~~	
6	8	Romania	Angela Moroșanu, Anamaria Ioniță, Bianca Răzor, Mirela Lavric	0.204	3:29.75	
