= Athletics at the 2012 Summer Olympics – Women's 4 × 400 metres relay =

Women's 4 × 400 metres relay at the Games of the XXX Olympiad
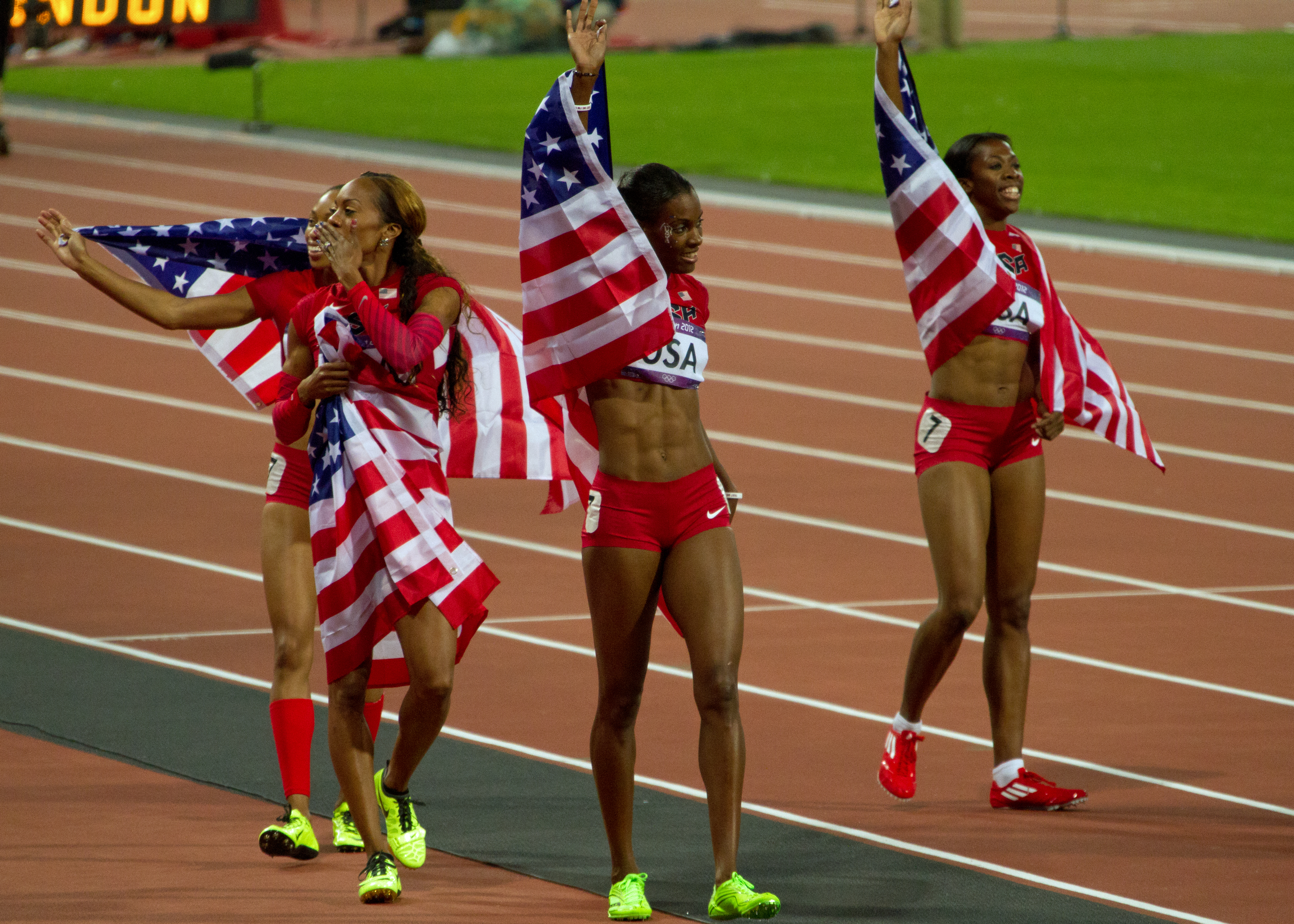
- Gold medal winners
- Venue: Olympic Stadium
- Date: 10–11 August 2012
- Teams: 16
- Winning time: 3:16.87

Medalists
1st place, gold medalist(s)		DeeDee Trotter; Allyson Felix; Francena McCorory; Sanya Richards-Ross; Keshia Baker*; Diamond Dixon*	United States
2nd place, silver medalist(s)		Christine Day; Rosemarie Whyte; Shericka Williams; Novlene Williams-Mills; Shereefa Lloyd*	Jamaica
3rd place, bronze medalist(s)		Alina Lohvynenko; Olha Zemlyak; Hanna Yaroshchuk; Nataliya Pyhyda	Ukraine

Official Video

The women's 4 × 400 metres relay competition at the 2012 Summer Olympics in London, United Kingdom was held at the Olympic Stadium on 10–11 August. 2012

== Summary ==
From the gun USA, Russia and Jamaica were the teams to watch in this final, entering as the reigning gold, silver and bronze medallists respectively from the previous Olympic Games.

From the start Yulia Gushchina of Russia – in lane 5 – went out hard making up the stagger on Christine Day of Jamaica in lane 6. Outside them in lane 7, for the Americans DeeDee Trotter was out conservatively slowly making up ground on Phara Anacharsis of France to her immediate outside.

In the last stages of the opening legs, Trotter for the USA came first into the home straight, pulling away from the entire field. Several metres back Yulia was in second place, Day coming back at her, in bid to win over the silver-medal position. Ukraine was fourth and Great Britain fifth coming in for the first handoffs.

DeeDee handed off first to Allyson Felix – the newly crowned 200-metre champion – who was out flying in a league of her own, widely extending the lead for the USA. Further back Antonina Krivoshapka was going on strong for the Russians, four metres behind her Rosemarie Whyte was in the bronze medal position for Jamaica. Several metres back, Ukraine's Olha Zemlyak was fighting to get back in contention for the bronze medal. 18 metres ahead of the field Felix handed over to Francena McCorory dropping a staggering 48.20s lap, the fastest time since her own time of 48.01s from half a decade ago, at the 2007 World Championships in Osaka.

Miles out in front, the USA were a different class – clearly in their own league – continuing to set the tone for the rest of the pack. The whole field was spread out, Tatyana Firova was in second-place position and Shericka Williams in third for Russia and Jamaica respectively. Ukraine was in fourth place and Great Britain fifth. Nigeria, France and the Czech Republic followed in that order.

Anchoring for the Americans Sanya Richards-Ross dropped a 49.10s leg, the second fastest of the race, giving USA a stress-free victory in the time of 3.16:87, with a 30-metre gap (It was almost 3 1/2 seconds at the finish). Russia was clearly second ahead of Jamaica and Ukraine, each team keeping the same positions from the first handoffs. Nigeria was later disqualified for lane infringement.

The same three countries, USA, Russia and Jamaica, finished in identical places in 2004, 2008 and 2012. Sanya Richards (Ross) for the US, Tatyana Firova for Russia and Novlene Williams (Mills) for Jamaica have been on all three teams.

A 2016 positive doping retest of Firova's sample from the 2008 Olympic relay resulted in the disqualification of Russia's 2008 team, but did not initially affect the 2012 team on which she had also run. On 1 February 2017, Antonina Krivoshapka's 2012 sample came back positive for dehydrochlormethyltestosterone (turinabol). The entire Russian team was thus retrospectively disqualified, and their silver medals reassigned to Jamaica, with Ukraine promoted to bronze. Krivoshapka's three 2012 teammates were later given retrospective bans for doping violations covering periods including the 2012 final: Yulia Gushchina later in 2017, then Firova in February 2019, and finally Antyukh on 24 October 2022.

== Records ==
Prior to the competition, the existing World and Olympic records were as follows.

World record	Soviet Union (Tatyana Ledovskaya, Olga Nazarova, Mariya Pinigina, Olga Bryzgina)	3:15.17	Seoul, South Korea	1 October 1988
Olympic record	Soviet Union (Tatyana Ledovskaya, Olga Nazarova, Mariya Pinigina, Olga Bryzgina)	3:15.17	Seoul, South Korea	1 October 1988
2012 World leading	United States Red (Francena McCorory, Allyson Felix, Natasha Hastings, Sanya Richards-Ross)	3:21.18	Philadelphia, United States	28 April 2012
Broken records during the 2012 Summer Olympics
2012 World leading	United States (DeeDee Trotter, Allyson Felix, Francena McCorory, Sanya Richards-Ross)	3:16.87	London, United Kingdom	11 August 2012

== Schedule ==
All times are British Summer Time (UTC+1)

Date	Time	Round
Friday, 10 August 2012	19:10	Round 1
Saturday, 11 August 2012	20:25	Finals

- Q denotes automatic qualification (based on place).
- q denotes provisional qualification (fastest non-automatic qualifiers).
- DNS denotes did not start.
- DNF denotes did not finish.
- DQ denotes disqualified
- AR denotes area record.
- NR denotes national record.
- PB denotes personal best.
- SB denotes season's best.

== Results ==
=== Round 1 ===
Qual. rule: first 3 of each heat (Q) plus the 2 fastest times (q) qualified.

Heat 1

Rank	Lane	Nation	Competitors	Time	Notes
1	2	Jamaica	Christine Day, Shereefa Lloyd, Shericka Williams, Rosemarie Whyte	3:25.13	Q, SB
2	3	Ukraine	Olha Zemlyak, Alina Lohvynenko, Hanna Yaroshchuk, Nataliya Pyhyda	3:25.90	Q
3	6	France	Phara Anacharsis, Muriel Hurtis, Marie Gayot, Floria Gueï	3:25.94	Q
4	8	Nigeria	Omolara Omotosho, Idara Otu, Bukola Abogunloko, Regina George	3:26.29	q, SB
5	4	Belarus	Alena Kiyevich, Iryna Khliustava, Ilona Usovich, Sviatlana Usovich	3:26.52	SB
6	5	Cuba	Aymée Martínez, Diosmely Peña, Yaimeisi Borlot, Daysiurami Bonne	3:27.41	SB
7	9	Italy	Chiara Bazzoni, Elena Maria Bonfanti, Libania Grenot, Maria Enrica Spacca	3:29.01	SB
8	7	Germany	Esther Cremer, Janin Lindenberg, Maral Feizbakhsh, Fabienne Kohlmann	3:31.06	

Heat 2

Rank	Lane	Nation	Competitors	Time	Notes
1	9	United States	Keshia Baker, Francena McCorory, Diamond Dixon, DeeDee Trotter	3:22.09	Q
2	4	Russia	Yuliya Gushchina, Tatyana Firova, Natalya Nazarova, Anastasiya Kapachinskaya	3:23.11	Q, SB
3	8	Great Britain	Shana Cox, Lee McConnell, Eilidh Child, Christine Ohuruogu	3:25.05	Q
4	6	Czech Republic	Denisa Rosolová, Zuzana Bergrová, Jitka Bartoničková, Zuzana Hejnová	3:26.20	q
5	7	Poland	Iga Baumgart, Justyna Święty, Anna Jesień, Patrycja Wyciszkiewicz	3:30.15	
6	2	Ireland	Marian Heffernan, Joanne Cuddihy, Jessie Barr, Michelle Carey	3:30.55	SB
7	5	Brazil	Joelma Sousa, Jailma de Lima, Aline dos Santos, Geisa Coutinho	3:32.95	
8	3	Turkey	Pınar Saka, Meliz Redif, Birsen Engin, Sema Apak	3:34.71	

=== Final ===
Rank	Lane	Nation	Competitors	Time	Notes
1st place, gold medalist(s)	7	United States	DeeDee Trotter, Allyson Felix, Francena McCorory, Sanya Richards-Ross	3:16.87	WL
2nd place, silver medalist(s)	6	Jamaica	Christine Day, Rosemarie Whyte, Shericka Williams, Novlene Williams-Mills	3:20.95	SB
3rd place, bronze medalist(s)	4	Ukraine	Alina Lohvynenko, Olha Zemlyak, Hanna Yaroshchuk, Nataliya Pyhyda	3:23.57	SB
4	9	Great Britain	Shana Cox, Lee McConnell, Perri Shakes-Drayton, Christine Ohuruogu	3:24.76	SB
5	8	France	Phara Anacharsis, Muriel Hurtis, Marie Gayot, Floria Gueï	3:25.92	
6	2	Czech Republic	Denisa Rosolova, Zuzana Bergrová, Jitka Bartoničková, Zuzana Hejnová	3:27.77	
—	5	Russia	Yulia Gushchina, Antonina Krivoshapka, Tatyana Firova, Natalya Antyukh	DQ (3:20.23)	Doping
—	3	Nigeria	Omolara Omotosho, Muizat Ajoke Odumosu, Regina George, Bukola Abogunloko	DQ	R 163.3a

- Nigeria originally finished in seventh place in the final but were disqualified due to a lane infringement.
