= 2014 European Athletics Championships – Women's 4 × 400 metres relay =

Women's 4 × 400 metres relay at the European Athletics Championships

The women's 4 × 400 metres relay at the 2014 European Athletics Championships took place at the Letzigrund on 16 and 17 August.

== Medalists ==
Gold	Marie Gayot, Muriel Hurtis, Agnès Raharolahy, Floria Gueï; France
Silver	Nataliya Pyhyda, Hrystyna Stuy, Hanna Ryzhykova, Olha Zemlyak; Ukraine
Bronze	Eilidh Child, Kelly Massey, Shana Cox, Margaret Adeoye; Great Britain

== Records ==
Standing records prior to the 2014 European Athletics Championships
World record	Soviet Union (Tatyana Ledovskaya, Olga Nazarova, Mariya Pinigina, Olga Bryzgina)	3:15.17	Seoul, South Korea	1 October 1988
European record	Soviet Union (Tatyana Ledovskaya, Olga Nazarova, Mariya Pinigina, Olga Bryzgina)	3:15.17	Seoul, South Korea	1 October 1988
Championship record	East Germany (Kirsten Emmelmann, Sabine Busch, Petra Müller, Marita Koch)	3:16.87	Stuttgart, West Germany	31 August 1986
World Leading	United States (DeeDee Trotter, Sanya Richards-Ross, Natasha Hastings, Joanna Atkins)	3:21.73	Nassau, Bahamas	25 May 2014
European Leading	France (Marie Gayot, Lénora Guion-Firmin, Agnès Raharolahy, Floria Gueï)	3:25.84	Nassau, Bahamas	25 May 2014

== Schedule ==
Date	Time	Round
16 August 2014	16:20	Round 1
17 August 2014	15:22	Final

All times are local times (UTC+2)

== Results ==
=== Round 1 ===
First 3 in each heat (Q) and 2 best performers (q) advance to the Final.

Rank	Heat	Nation	Athletes	Time	Notes
1	1	Ukraine	Darya Prystupa, Olha Lyakhova, Hanna Ryzhykova, Hrystyna Stuy	3:28.18	Q
2	2	Russia	Mariya Mikhailyuk, Tatyana Veshkurova, Tatyana Firova, Kseniya Zadorina	3:28.42	Q, SB
3	2	Great Britain	Emily Diamond, Kelly Massey, Victoria Ohuruogu, Margaret Adeoye	3:28.44	Q
4	1	France	Estelle Perrossier, Muriel Hurtis, Phara Anacharsis, Agnès Raharolahy	3:28.58	Q
5	2	Poland	Iga Baumgart, Patrycja Wyciszkiewicz, Agata Bednarek, Justyna Święty	3:29.79	Q
6	2	Germany	Ruth Sophia Spelmeyer, Lena Schmidt, Janin Lindenberg, Lara Hoffmann	3:30.39	q
7	1	Italy	Maria Benedicta Chigbolu, Maria Enrica Spacca, Elena Bonfanti, Chiara Bazzoni	3:31.31	Q
8	1	Belgium	Laetitia Libert, Kimberley Efonye, Olivia Borlée, Justien Grillet	3:32.22	q
9	1	Romania	Adelina Pastor, Mihaela Nunu, Angela Moroșanu, Bianca Răzor	3:33.84	
10	1	Portugal	Filipa Martins, Vera Barbosa, Dorothé Évora, Cátia Azevedo	3:35.41	SB
11	2	Lithuania	Eva Misiūnaitė, Modesta Morauskaitė, Eglė Staišiūnaitė, Agnė Šerkšnienė	3:36.25	
12	1	Finland	Katri Mustola, Ella Räsänen, Sanna Aaltonen, Anniina Laitinen	3:36.47	
13	2	Norway	Tara Marie Norum, Trine Mjåland, Vilde Jakobsen Svortevik, Line Kloster	3:36.57	
14	2	Slovakia	Sylvia Salgovicová, Alexandra Štuková, Andrea Holleyová, Iveta Putalová	3:39.55	
15	2	Croatia	Dora Filipović, Marija Hižman, Lucija Pokos, Kristina Dudek	3:42.96	
16	1	Turkey	Birsen Engin, Tuğba Koyuncu, Meliz Redif, Meryem Kasap	3:48.10	

=== Final ===
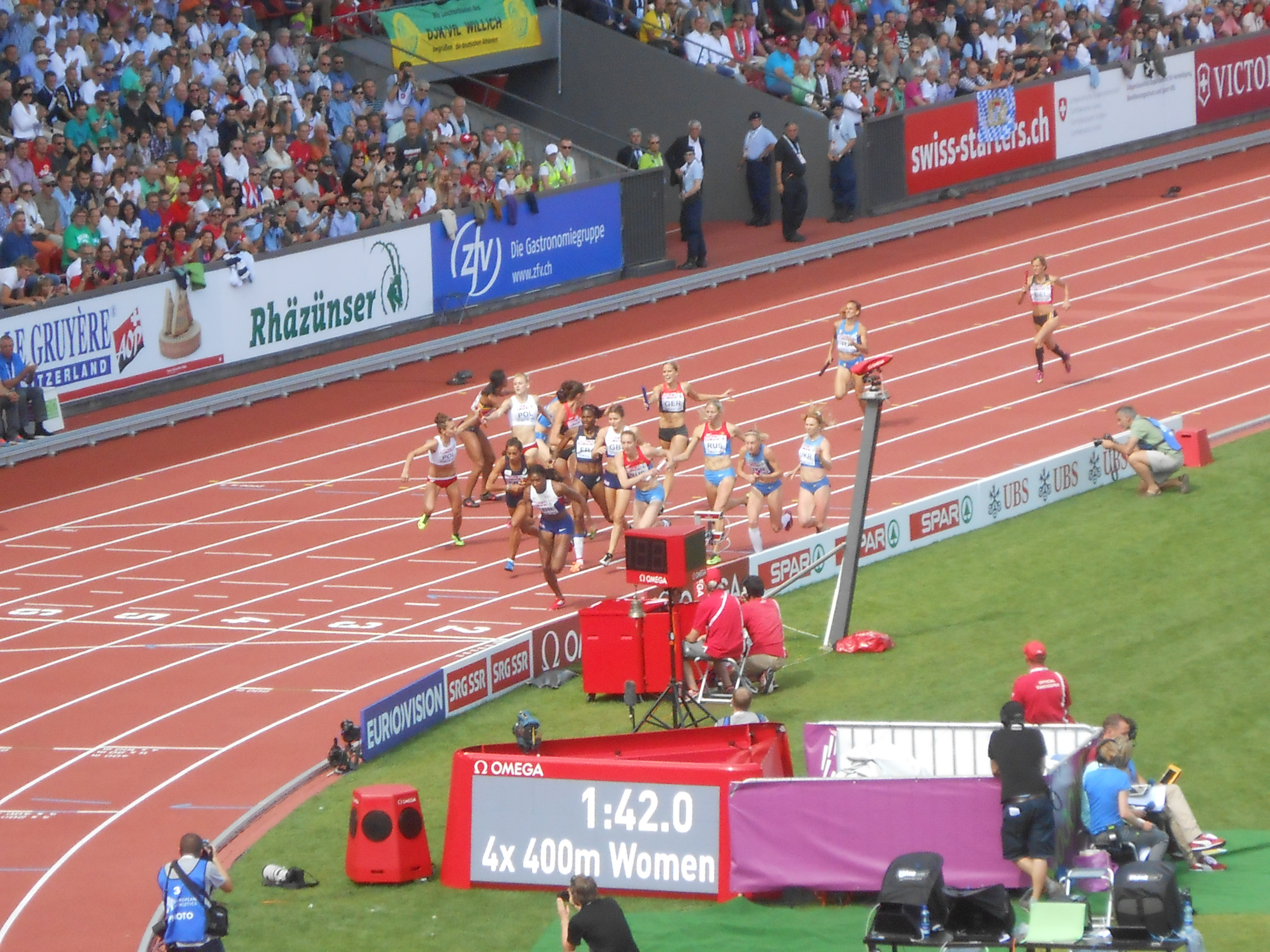
Women's 4 × 400 m relay

Rank	Lane	Nation	Athletes	Time	Note
1st place, gold medalist(s)	6	France	Marie Gayot, Muriel Hurtis, Agnès Raharolahy, Floria Gueï	3:24.27	EL
2nd place, silver medalist(s)	5	Ukraine	Nataliya Pyhyda, Hrystyna Stuy, Hanna Ryzhykova, Olha Zemlyak	3:24.32	SB
3rd place, bronze medalist(s)	4	Great Britain	Eilidh Child, Kelly Massey, Shana Cox, Margaret Adeoye	3:24.34	SB
4	3	Russia	Alena Tamkova, Tatyana Veshkurova, Tatyana Firova, Yekaterina Renzhina	3:25.02	SB
5	7	Poland	Małgorzata Hołub, Patrycja Wyciszkiewicz, Joanna Linkiewicz, Justyna Święty	3:25.73	SB
6	1	Germany	Esther Cremer, Christiane Klopsch, Lena Schmidt, Ruth Sophia Spelmeyer	3:27.69	SB
7	8	Italy	Chiara Bazzoni, Maria Enrica Spacca, Elena Bonfanti, Libania Grenot	3:28.30	
8	2	Belgium	Laetitia Libert, Olivia Borlée, Kimberley Efonye, Justien Grillet	3:31.82	SB
