= 2016 European Athletics Championships – Women's 4 × 400 metres relay =

Women's 4 × 400 metres relay at the European Athletics Championships
- Venue: Olympic Stadium
- Location: Amsterdam
- Dates: 9 July (round 1); 10 July (final)
- Competitors: 71 from 16 nations
- Winning time: 3:25.05 WL

Medalists
gold medal	Emily Diamond; Anyika Onuora; Eilidh Doyle; Seren Bundy-Davies; Margaret Adeoye*; Kelly Massey*	Great Britain
silver medal	Phara Anacharsis; Brigitte Ntiamoah; Marie Gayot; Floria Gueï; Agnès Raharolahy*; Elea-Mariama Diarra*	France
bronze medal	Maria Benedicta Chigbolu; Maria Enrica Spacca; Chiara Bazzoni; Libania Grenot; Elena Bonfanti*	Italy

The women's 4 × 400 metres relay at the 2016 European Athletics Championships took place at the Olympic Stadium on 9 and 10 July. Prior to the event, Great Britain had the 2016 leading European time of 3:28.62, and they kept their form throughout the competition, setting a new leading European time in the heats and the new 2016 world leading time of 3:25.05 in the final. The team that won gold consisted of Emily Diamond, Anyika Onuora, Eilidh Doyle and Seren Bundy-Davies. The silver medal was won by France, and the bronze by Italy, both setting their season's best times.

== Records ==
Standing records prior to the 2016 European Athletics Championships
World record	Soviet Union; Tatyana Ledovskaya; Olga Nazarova; Mariya Pinigina; Olga Bryzgina	3:15.17	Seoul, South Korea	1 October 1988
European record	Soviet Union; Tatyana Ledovskaya; Olga Nazarova; Mariya Pinigina; Olga Bryzgina	3:15.17	Seoul, South Korea	1 October 1988
Championship record	East Germany; Kirsten Emmelmann; Sabine Busch; Petra Müller; Marita Koch	3:16.87	Stuttgart, West Germany	31 August 1986
World Leading	United States; Damajahnee Birch; Daina Harper; Monisa Dobbins; Ceara Watson	3:25.48	Lawrence, Kansas, United States	28 May 2016
European Leading	United Kingdom; Kelly Massey; Laviai Nielsen; Perri Shakes-Drayton; Emily Diamond	3:28.62	Regensburg, Germany	5 June 2016

== Schedule ==
Date	Time	Round
9 July 2016	13:55	Heats
10 July 2016	18:40	Final

All times are local times (UTC+2)

== Results ==
=== Heats ===
First 3 in each heat (Q) and 2 best performers (q) advance to the Final.

Rank	Heat	Nation	Athletes	Time	Notes
1	1	Great Britain	Eilidh Doyle, Margaret Adeoye, Kelly Massey, Seren Bundy-Davies	3:26.42	Q, EL
2	1	Poland	Ewelina Ptak, Martyna Dąbrowska, Iga Baumgart, Patrycja Wyciszkiewicz	3:27.72	Q, SB
3	2	Ukraine	Yuliya Olishevska, Olha Bibik, Tetyana Melnyk, Olha Zemlyak	3:27.75	Q
4	2	Germany	Laura Müller, Friederike Möhlenkamp, Lara Hoffmann, Ruth Spelmeyer	3:28.03	Q, SB
5	2	France	Marie Gayot, Brigitte Ntiamoah, Agnès Raharolahy, Elea-Mariama Diarra	3:28.38	Q, SB
6	2	Romania	Adelina Pastor, Anamaria Ioniță, Sanda Belgyan, Andrea Miklós	3:29.08	q, SB
7	2	Netherlands	Nicky van Leuveren, Lisanne de Witte, Eva Hovenkamp, Laura de Witte	3:29.18	q, NR
8	1	Italy	Maria Benedicta Chigbolu, Maria Enrica Spacca, Chiara Bazzoni, Elena Bonfanti	3:29.57	Q, SB
9	1	Belarus	Alena Kievich, Yulia Yurenia, Katsiaryna Khairullina, Ilona Usovich	3:31.23	SB
10	1	Slovakia	Silvia Šalgovičová, Alexandra Štuková, Alexandra Bezeková, Iveta Putálová	3:31.66	NR
10	2	Greece	Ekaterini Dalaka, Anna Vasiliou, Despina Mourta, Irini Vasiliou	3:31.66	SB
12	1	Norway	Benedicte Hauge, Sara Dorothea Jensen, Ida Bakke Hansen, Line Kloster	3:31.73	NR
13	1	Portugal	Rivinilda Mentai, Filipa Martins, Catia Azevedo, Dorothé Évora	3:32.48	SB
14	2	Spain	Laura Bueno, Aauri Lorena Bokesa, Bárbara Camblor, Geraxane Ussia	3:33.57	SB
15	2	Ireland	Sinead Denny, Phil Healy, Jenna Bromell, Ciara McCallion	3:34.02	SB
16	1	Turkey	Berfe Sancak, Meryem Kasap, Emel Şanlı, Elif Yıldırım	3:38.47	

=== Final ===
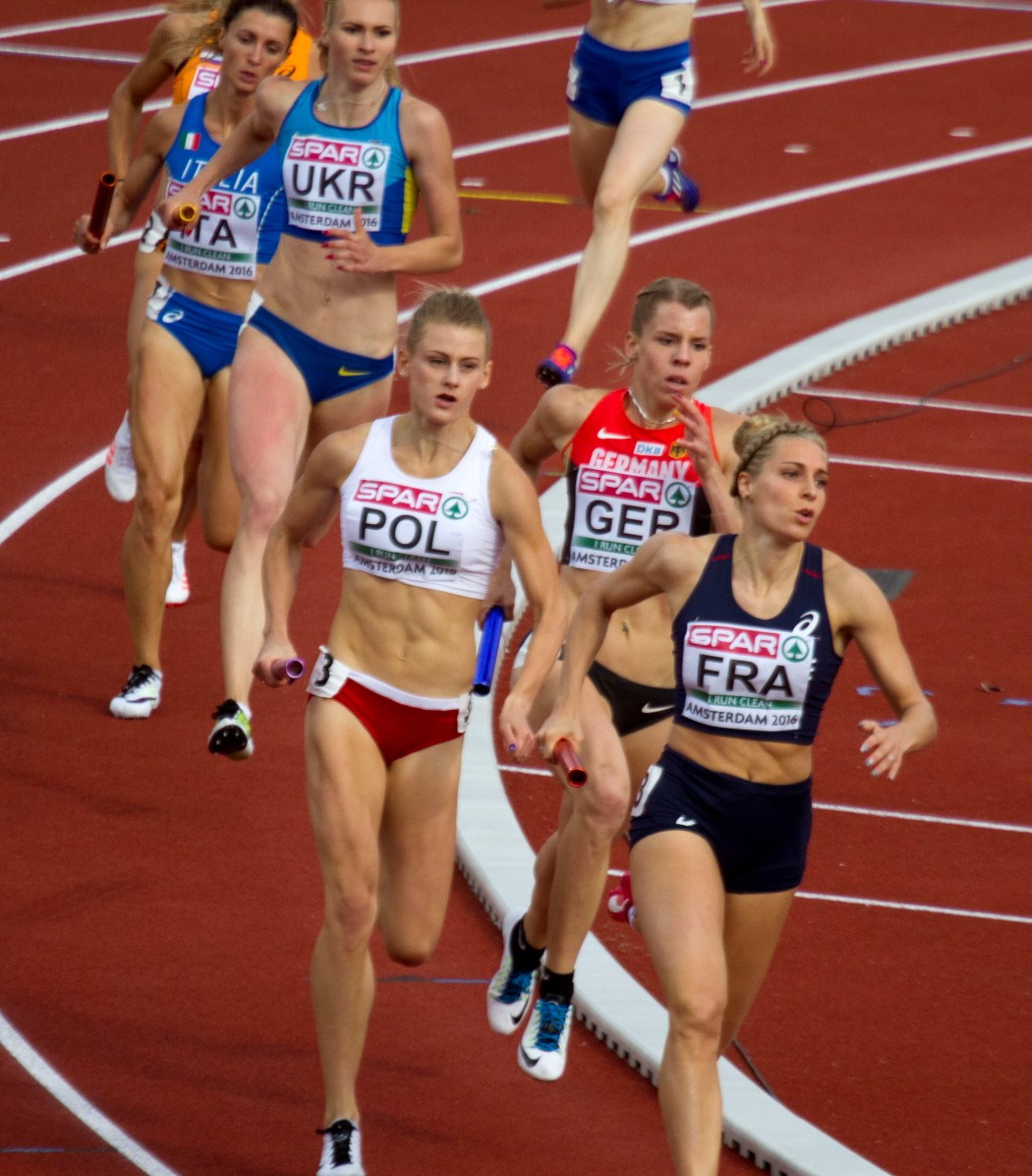
The third leg of the final

Rank	Lane	Nation	Athletes	Time	Notes
1st place, gold medalist(s)	5	Great Britain	Emily Diamond, Anyika Onuora, Eilidh Doyle, Seren Bundy-Davies	3:25.05	WL
2nd place, silver medalist(s)	8	France	Phara Anacharsis, Brigitte Ntiamoah, Marie Gayot, Floria Gueï	3:25.96	SB
3rd place, bronze medalist(s)	7	Italy	Maria Benedicta Chigbolu, Maria Enrica Spacca, Chiara Bazzoni, Libania Grenot	3:27.49	SB
4	3	Poland	Ewelina Ptak, Małgorzata Hołub, Patrycja Wyciszkiewicz, Justyna Święty	3:27.60	SB
5	4	Germany	Laura Müller, Friederike Möhlenkamp, Lara Hoffmann, Ruth Spelmeyer	3:27.60	SB
6	6	Ukraine	Yuliya Olishevska, Olha Bibik, Tetyana Melnyk, Olha Zemlyak	3:27.64	SB
7	2	Netherlands	Laura de Witte, Lisanne de Witte, Eva Hovenkamp, Nicky van Leuveren	3:29.23	
8	1	Romania	Adelina Pastor, Anamaria Ioniță, Sanda Belgyan, Andrea Miklós	3:30.63	
