= 2012 European Athletics Championships – Women's 400 metres =

Women's 400 metres at the European Athletics Championships
- Venue: Helsinki Olympic Stadium
- Location: Helsinki, Finland
- Dates: 27, 28 and 29 June 2012
- Winning time: 51.13 s NR

Medalists
gold medal	Moa Hjelmer	Sweden
silver medal	Ksenia Zadorina	Russia
bronze medal	Ilona Vusovich	Belarus

The women's 400 metres at the 2012 European Athletics Championships were held at the Helsinki Olympic Stadium on 27, 28 and 29 June.

== Records ==
Standing records prior to the 2012 European Athletics Championships
World record	Marita Koch (GDR)	47.60	Canberra, Australia	6 October 1985
European record	Marita Koch (GDR)	47.60	Canberra, Australia	6 October 1985
Championship record	Marita Koch (GDR)	48.16	Athens, Greece	8 September 1982
World Leading	Sanya Richards-Ross (USA)	49.28	Eugene, United States	24 June 2012
European Leading	Antonina Krivoshapka (RUS)	49.43	Krasnodar, Russia	8 June 2012

== Schedule ==
Date	Time	Round
27 June 2012	17:50	Round 1
28 June 2012	17:15	Semifinals
29 June 2012	22:25	Final

== Results ==
=== Round 1 ===
First 3 in each heat (Q) and 4 best performers (q) advance to the Semifinals.

Rank	Heat	Lane	Name	Nationality	Time	Note
1	4	3	Ilona Vusovich	Belarus	51.98	Q
2	4	4	Muriel Hurtis	France	52.11	Q, SB
3	1	4	Ksenia Zadorina	Russia	52.18	Q
4	1	2	Moa Hjelmer	Sweden	52.33	Q
5	3	2	Marie Gayot	France	52.46	Q
6	2	6	Olha Zemlyak	Ukraine	52.48	Q
7	3	8	Lee McConnell	Great Britain	52.58	Q
8	2	8	Esther Cremer	Germany	52.76	Q
9	2	2	Agnė Šerkšnienė	Lithuania	52.89	Q
10	2	5	Libania Grenot	Italy	53.09	q
DQ	3	3	Pınar Saka	Turkey	~~53.13~~	Q, Doping
11	4	7	Jitka Bartoničková	Czech Republic	53.15	Q
12	1	8	Darya Prystupa	Ukraine	53.16	Q
13	2	3	Agata Bednarek	Poland	53.22	q
14	1	1	Aauri Bokesa	Spain	53.23	q
15	3	4	Maria Enrica Spacca	Italy	53.26	q
16	2	7	Sanda Belgyan	Romania	53.32	
17	3	1	Olessa Cojuhari	Moldova	53.52	
18	3	5	Justyna Święty	Poland	53.68	
19	1	7	Magdalena Gorzkowska	Poland	53.74	
20	4	6	Chiara Bazzoni	Italy	53.92	
DQ	2	4	Meliz Redif	Turkey	~~53.99~~	Doping
21	3	6	Adelina Pastor	Romania	54.35	
22	1	3	Kelly Massey	Great Britain	54.44	
23	4	8	Ella Räsänen	Finland	54.52	SB
24	4	2	Josefin Magnusson	Sweden	55.01	
25	1	5	Anita Banović	Croatia	55.50	
26	1	6	Birsen Engen	Turkey	55.82	
	4	1	Nicola Sanders	Great Britain	DNS	
	3	7	Maris Mägi	Estonia	DQ	
	4	5	Joanne Cuddihy	Ireland	DQ	

=== Semifinals ===
First 3 in each heat (Q) and 2 best performers (q) advance to the Final.

Rank	Heat	Lane	Name	Nationality	Time	Note
1	1	4	Ksenia Zadorina	Russia	51.35	Q, SB
2	1	3	Moa Hjelmer	Sweden	51.40	Q, NR
3	1	6	Lee McConnell	Great Britain	51.98	Q, SB
4	2	2	Libania Grenot	Italy	52.02	Q
5	2	5	Olha Zemlyak	Ukraine	52.10	Q
6	2	4	Ilona Vusovich	Belarus	52.10	Q
7	2	3	Muriel Hurtis	France	52.13	q
8	1	8	Darya Prystupa	Ukraine	52.15	q
9	1	5	Marie Gayot	France	52.17	
10	1	1	Aauri Lorena Bokesa	Spain	52.47	PB
11	2	6	Esther Cremer	Germany	52.77	
12	2	7	Jitka Bartoničková	Czech Republic	52.78	
DQ	1	7	Pınar Saka	Turkey	~~52.84~~	Doping
13	1	2	Maria Enrica Spacca	Italy	53.02	
14	2	8	Agnė Šerkšnienė	Lithuania	53.07	
	2	1	Agata Bednarek	Poland	DQ	

=== Final ===
Rank	Lane	Name	Nationality	Time	Note
1st place, gold medalist(s)	6	Moa Hjelmer	Sweden	51.13	NR
2nd place, silver medalist(s)	4	Ksenia Zadorina	Russia	51.26	SB
3rd place, bronze medalist(s)	7	Ilona Vusovich	Belarus	51.94	
4	5	Olha Zemlyak	Ukraine	52.01	
5	8	Lee McConnell	Great Britain	52.20	
6	3	Libania Grenot	Italy	52.57	
7	1	Darya Prystupa	Ukraine	53.03	
8	2	Muriel Hurtis	France	54.50	
