= 2011 World Championships in Athletics – Women's 4 × 400 metres relay =

Official Video

The Women's 4 × 400 metres relay event at the 2011 World Championships in Athletics was held at the Daegu Stadium on 2 and 3 September. Friday and Saturday. This is a change in schedule from previous years when all the relays were at the end of the program. This might necessitate a change in strategy to allow for team members involved in other events.

The United States held the two fastest relay times before the championships and had won the 2007 and 2009 world titles, as well as the 2008 Olympic gold medals. Jamaica and Russia – the only other nations to have won a world title since 2000 – were the other primary contenders. A Brazilian team had broken the South American record a month before the championships and was the third fastest qualifying nation. Great Britain, Ukraine and Germany comprised the other major nations at the competition.

Twenty teams, instead of the normal sixteen, started this event, necessitating three heats instead of two. United States was an easy winner in heat one, with Ukraine edging out neighboring Belarus for the second automatic qualifying spot, but Belarus qualified on time. Russia, with the fastest time, was an easy winner in heat two with Nigeria taking the second automatic spot and Czech Republic taking the second time qualifier. Jamaica and Great Britain separated cleanly from their competitors in heat three.

In the final, the United States led off with previous world champion Sanya Richards-Ross, who handed off to silver medalist Allyson Felix in the lead. Felix extended the lead with Russian Natalya Antyukh and then Jamaica 's Davita Prendergast chasing about 5 metres back. Prendergast passed a fading Antyukh, who had charged after Felix and was slowing, just before the handoff. Novlene Williams-Mills solidified Jamaica's hold on second place during the third leg. On the anchor leg, Francena McCorory burst away from the handoff, extending the lead to 10 metres and discouraging a challenge. McCorory paid for that burst on the home stretch, but still maintained the 5 metre lead at the finish. Jamaica knocked a second off their National record.

On 21 June 2017, Russia forfeited the bronze medal following the disqualification of Kapachinskaya. The medal was reallocated by IAAF to Great Britain.

== Medalists ==
Gold	Silver	Bronze
United States; Sanya Richards-Ross; Allyson Felix; Jessica Beard; Francena McCorory; Natasha Hastings*; Keshia Baker*	Jamaica; Rosemarie Whyte; Davita Prendergast; Novlene Williams-Mills; Shericka Williams; Shereefa Lloyd*; Patricia Hall*	Great Britain & N.I. Perri Shakes-Drayton; Nicola Sanders; Christine Ohuruogu; Lee McConnell

== Records ==
World record	Soviet Union (Tatyana Ledovskaya, Olga Nazarova, Mariya Kulchunova, Olga Bryzgina)	3:15.17	Seoul, South Korea	1 October 1988
Championship record	United States (Gwen Torrence, Maicel Malone-Wallace, Natasha Kaiser-Brown, Jearl Miles Clark)	3:16.71	Stuttgart, Germany	22 August 1993
World leading	United States Red (Debbie Dunn, Allyson Felix, Natasha Hastings, Sanya Richards-Ross)	3:22.92	Philadelphia, United States	30 April 2011
African record	Nigeria (Olabisi Afolabi, Fatima Yusuf, Charity Opara, Falilat Ogunkoya)	3:21.04	Atlanta, GA, United States	3 August 1996
Asian record	(China) Hebei province (Xiaohong An, Xiaoyun Bai, Chunying Cao, Yuqin Ma)	3:24.28	Beijing, China	13 September 1993
North, Central American and Caribbean record	United States (Denean Howard-Hill, Diane Dixon, Valerie Brisco-Hooks, Florence Griffith-Joyner)	3:15.51	Seoul, South Korea	1 October 1988
South American record	(Brazil) BM&F Bovespa (Geisa Aparecida Coutinho, Bárbara de Oliveira, Joelma Sousa, Jailma de Lima)	3:26.68	São Paulo, Brazil	7 August 2011
European record	Soviet Union (Tatyana Ledovskaya, Olga Nazarova, Mariya Kulchunova, Olga Bryzgina)	3:15.17	Seoul, South Korea	1 October 1988
Oceanian record	Australia (Nova Peris, Tamsyn Manou, Melinda Gainsford-Taylor, Cathy Freeman)	3:23.81	Sydney, Australia	30 September 2000

== Qualification standards ==
A time	B time
3:32.00

== Schedule ==
Date	Time	Round
2 September 2011	12:10	Heats
3 September 2011	20:40	Final

== Results ==
KEY:	q	Fastest non-qualifiers	Q	Qualified	NR	National record	PB	Personal best	SB	Seasonal best

=== Heats ===
Qualification: First 2 of each heat (Q) plus the 2 fastest times (q) advance to the final.

Rank	Heat	Nation	Athletes	Time	Notes
1	2	Russia	Kseniya Vdovina, Ksenia Zadorina, Lyudmila Litvinova, Antonina Krivoshapka	3:20.94	Q, WL
2	3	Jamaica	Rosemarie Whyte, Shereefa Lloyd, Patricia Hall, Davita Prendergast	3:22.01	Q, SB
3	3	Great Britain & N.I.	Christine Ohuruogu, Nicola Sanders, Lee McConnell, Perri Shakes-Drayton	3:23.05	Q, SB
4	1	United States	Natasha Hastings, Jessica Beard, Francena McCorory, Keshia Baker	3:23.57	Q
5	1	Belarus	Hanna Tashpulatava, Yulyana Yushchanka, Ilona Usovich, Sviatlana Usovich	3:24.28	q, SB
6	2	Nigeria	Omolara Omotosho, Muizat Ajoke Odumosu, Margaret Etim, Bukola Abogunloko	3:25.59	Q, SB
7	2	Czech Republic	Denisa Rosolová, Zuzana Bergrová, Jitka Bartoničková, Zuzana Hejnová	3:26.01	q, SB
8	3	Italy	Chiara Bazzoni, Maria Enrica Spacca, Libania Grenot, Marta Milani	3:26.48	SB
9	2	Cuba	Aymée Martínez, Diosmely Peña, Susana Clement, Daisurami Bonne	3:26.74	SB
10	1	Germany	Janin Lindenberg, Esther Cremer, Lena Schmidt, Claudia Hoffmann	3:27.31	SB
11	3	Ireland	Marian Andrews-Heffernan, Joanne Cuddihy, Claire Bergin, Michelle Carey	3:27.48	NR
12	2	Canada	Adrienne Power, Esther Akinsulie, Jenna Martin, Lemlem Bereket	3:27.92	SB
13	1	France	Phara Anacharsis, Muriel Hurtis-Houairi, Marie Gayot, Floria Gueï	3:28.02	SB
14	3	Turkey	Nagihan Karadere, Birsen Engin, Meliz Redif, Pınar Saka	3:32.15	
15	1	Australia	Caitlin Sargent, Caitlin Willis-Pincott, Lauren Boden, Anneliese Rubie	3:32.27	SB
16	3	China	Chen Yanmei, Tang Xiaoyin, Zheng Zhihui, Chen Jingwen	3:32.39	SB
17	2	Brazil	Geisa Coutinho, Bárbara de Oliveira, Joelma Sousa, Jailma de Lima	3:32.43	
18	3	South Korea	Woo Yu-jin, Lee Ha-nee, Park Seongmyun, Oh Se-ra	3:43.22	SB
	1	Kazakhstan	Alexandra Kuzina, Viktoriya Yalovtseva, Marina Maslenko, Tatyana Khadjimuradova	DNF	
	1	Ukraine	Nataliya Pyhyda, Olha Zavhorodnya, Hanna Yaroshchuk, Antonina Yefremova	(3:24.13)	DQ^{1}

=== Final ===
Rank	Lane	Nation	Athletes	Time	Notes
1st place, gold medalist(s)	6	United States	Sanya Richards-Ross, Allyson Felix, Jessica Beard, Francena McCorory	3:18.09	WL
2nd place, silver medalist(s)	4	Jamaica	Rosemarie Whyte, Davita Prendergast, Novlene Williams-Mills, Shericka Williams	3:18.71	NR
3rd place, bronze medalist(s)	3	Great Britain & N.I.	Perri Shakes-Drayton, Nicola Sanders, Christine Ohuruogu, Lee McConnell	3:23.63	
4	1	Belarus	Hanna Tashpulatava, Yulyana Yushchanka, Ilona Usovich, Sviatlana Usovich	3:25.64	
5	2	Czech Republic	Denisa Rosolová, Zuzana Bergrová, Jitka Bartoničková, Zuzana Hejnová	3:26.57	
6	8	Nigeria	Omolara Omotosho, Muizat Ajoke Odumosu, Margaret Etim, Bukola Abogunloko	3:29.82	
	5	Russia	Antonina Krivoshapka, Natalya Antyukh, Lyudmila Litvinova, Anastasiya Kapachinskaya	3:19.36	DQ^{1}
	7	Ukraine	Nataliya Pyhyda, Anastasiya Rabchenyuk, Hanna Yaroshchuk, Antonina Yefremova	3:23.86	DQ^{2}

^{1} Positive drug test of Kapachinskaya ^{2} Positive drug test of Yefremova
