= 2013 World Championships in Athletics – Women's 4 × 400 metres relay =

Women's 4 × 400 metres relay at the 2013 World Championships
- Venue: Luzhniki Stadium
- Dates: 16 August (heats); 17 August (final)
- Competitors: 68 from 17 nations
- Winning time: 3:20.19

Medalists
gold medal	United States; Jessica Beard; Natasha Hastings; Ashley Spencer; Francena McCorory; Joanna Atkins
silver medal	Great Britain & N.I. Eilidh Child; Shana Cox; Margaret Adeoye; Christine Ohuruogu
bronze medal	France; Marie Gayot; Lénora Guion-Firmin; Muriel Hurtis-Houairi; Floria Gueï

Official Video

The women's 4 × 400 metres relay at the 2013 World Championships in Athletics was held at the Luzhniki Stadium on 16–17 August.

== Summary ==
After giving up .08 in reaction time at the start, Jessica Beard split 50.79 to give the United States the early lead. By the time Natasha Hastings broke, she had a clear lead of more than 10 meters over the Tatyana Firova from Russia in second place. But after a 49.88 lap by Hastings (Firova obviously much faster than that), the Russian team had pulled even at the handoff. Kseniya Ryzhova went around the outside of Ashley Spencer and into the lead. Ryzhova opened up as much as a 2-meter lead, but by the home stretch, Spencer had gained that back and passed Ryzhova on the inside. But Ryzhova fought back to a slight lead. With the American team in second place coming off the turn, Francena McCorory was waiting in lane 2. Spencer had to cross behind Ryzhova to hand off. It was 400-meter bronze medalist Antonina Krivoshapka against 6th placer Francena McCorory, with Great Britain anchored by gold medalist Christine Ohuruogu a distant third. Krivoshapka opened up about a 5-meter lead on the back stretch, but McCorory looked to run within herself and came back to pass Krivoshapka on the home stretch. But Krivoshapka fought back, retaking the lead and holding it across the finish. Ohuruogu found herself challenged by Floria Gueï on the backstretch but ran away from her on the home stretch for a clear third place.

In 2016, Russia's anchor runner Antonina Krivoshapka's samples from the 2012 Olympics were retested and found to contain turinabol. In 2017 she was given a two-year ban including this race and Russia was disqualified. All teams advanced one place. The IAAF conducted the medal ceremony at the 2017 World Championships.

== Records ==
Prior to the competition, the records were as follows:

World record	Soviet Union (Tatyana Ledovskaya, Olga Nazarova, Mariya Kulchunova, Olga Bryzgina)	3:15.17	Seoul, South Korea	1 October 1988
Championship record	United States (Gwen Torrence, Maicel Malone-Wallace, Natasha Kaiser-Brown, Jearl Miles Clark)	3:16.71	Stuttgart, Germany	22 August 1993
World leading	United States Red (Jessica Beard, Natasha Hastings, DeeDee Trotter, Francena McCorory)	3:22.66	Philadelphia, United States	27 April 2013
African record	Nigeria (Olabisi Afolabi, Fatima Yusuf, Charity Opara, Falilat Ogunkoya)	3:21.04	Atlanta, United States	3 August 1996
Asian record	Hebei Province (An Xiaohong, Bai Xiaoyun, Cao Chunying, Ma Yuqin)	3:24.28	Beijing, People's Republic of China	13 September 1993
North, Central American and Caribbean record	United States (Denean Howard-Hill, Diane Dixon, Valerie Brisco-Hooks, Florence Griffith Joyner)	3:15.51	Seoul, South Korea	1 October 1988
South American record	BM&F Bovespa (Geisa Aparecida Coutinho, Bárbara de Oliveira, Joelma Sousa, Jailma de Lima)	3:26.68	São Paulo, Brazil	7 August 2011
European record	Soviet Union (Tatyana Ledovskaya, Olga Nazarova, Mariya Kulchunova, Olga Bryzgina)	3:15.17	Seoul, South Korea	1 October 1988
Oceanian record	Australia (Nova Peris, Tamsyn Manou, Melinda Gainsford-Taylor, Cathy Freeman)	3:23.81	Sydney	30 September 2000

== Qualification standards ==
Time
3:33:00

== Schedule ==
Date	Time	Round
16 August 2013	11:30	Heats
17 August 2013	19:30	Final

All times are local times (UTC+4)

== Results ==
KEY:	Q	Qualified	q	Fastest non-qualifiers	NR	National record	PB	Personal best	SB	Seasonal best

=== Heats ===
Qualification: First 2 of each heat (Q) plus the 2 fastest times (q) advance to the final.

Rank	Heat	Lane	Nation	Athletes	Time	Notes
1	3	2	Russia	Yuliya Gushchina, Tatyana Firova, Natalya Antyukh, Kseniya Ryzhova	3:23.51	Q, SB
2	1	4	United States	Ashley Spencer, Jessica Beard, Joanna Atkins, Francena McCorory	3:25.18	Q
3	2	5	Great Britain & N.I.	Eilidh Child, Shana Cox, Margaret Adeoye, Christine Ohuruogu	3:25.39	Q
4	2	2	Nigeria	Patience Okon George, Bukola Abogunloko, Omolara Omotosho, Regina George	3:27.29	Q, SB
5	2	3	France	Marie Gayot, Muriel Hurtis-Houairi, Phara Anacharsis, Floria Gueï	3:27.75	q, SB
6	1	5	Italy	Chiara Bazzoni, Marta Milani, Maria Benedicta Chigbolu, Libania Grenot	3:29.62	Q, SB
6	3	3	Romania	Alina Andreea Panainte, Adelina Pastor, Sanda Belgyan, Bianca Răzor	3:29.62	Q
8	1	3	Ukraine	Daryna Prystupa, Olha Zemlyak, Alina Lohvynenko, Nataliya Pyhyda	3:29.63	q
9	3	7	Poland	Małgorzata Hołub, Patrycja Wyciszkiewicz, Iga Baumgart, Justyna Święty	3:29.75	
10	3	6	Belarus	Hanna Reishal, Iryna Khliustava, Yuliya Yurenia, Ilona Vusovich	3:30.28	SB
11	1	2	Czech Republic	Denisa Rosolová, Jitka Bartoničková, Jana Slaninová, Zuzana Hejnová	3:30.48	
12	3	5	Canada	Alicia Brown, Sarah Wells, Noelle Montcalm, Jenna Martin	3:31.09	SB
13	2	7	Bahamas	Amara Jones, Lanece Clarke, Shakeitha Henfield, Cotrell Martin	3:32.91	
14	2	4	Trinidad and Tobago	Shawna Fermin, Sparkle McKnight, Domonique Williams, Romona Modeste	3:33.50	
15	1	6	India	Nirmala, Tintu Luka, Anu Mariam Jose, M. R. Poovamma	3:38.81	
16	2	6	Botswana	Goitseone Seleka, Lydia Mashila, Oarabile Babolayi, Amantle Montsho	3:38.96	SB
	3	4	Jamaica	Rosemarie Whyte, Kaliese Spencer, Anastasia Le-Roy, Christine Day	DQ	163.3(a)

=== Final ===
The final was started at 19:30.

Rank	Lane	Nation	Athletes	Time	Notes
1st place, gold medalist(s)	5	United States	Jessica Beard, Natasha Hastings, Ashley Spencer, Francena McCorory	3:20.41	SB
2nd place, silver medalist(s)	6	Great Britain & N.I.	Eilidh Child, Shana Cox, Margaret Adeoye, Christine Ohuruogu	3:22.61	SB
3rd place, bronze medalist(s)	1	France	Marie Gayot, Lénora Guion-Firmin, Muriel Hurtis-Houairi, Floria Gueï	3:24.21	SB
4	2	Ukraine	Daryna Prystupa, Olha Lyakhova, Alina Lohvynenko, Nataliya Pyhyda	3:27.38	SB
5	3	Nigeria	Omolara Omotosho, Patience Okon George, Bukola Abogunloko, Regina George	3:27.57	
6	8	Romania	Adelina Pastor, Elena Mirela Lavric, Sanda Belgyan, Bianca Răzor	3:28.40	SB
	7	Italy	Chiara Bazzoni, Marta Milani, Maria Enrica Spacca, Libania Grenot	DQ	170.6
DSQ	4	Russia	Yuliya Gushchina, Tatyana Firova, Kseniya Ryzhova, Antonina Krivoshapka	DQ	AD 11.1
