= Athletics at the 2016 Summer Olympics – Women's 4 × 400 metres relay =

Women's 4 × 400 metres relay at the Games of the XXXI Olympiad
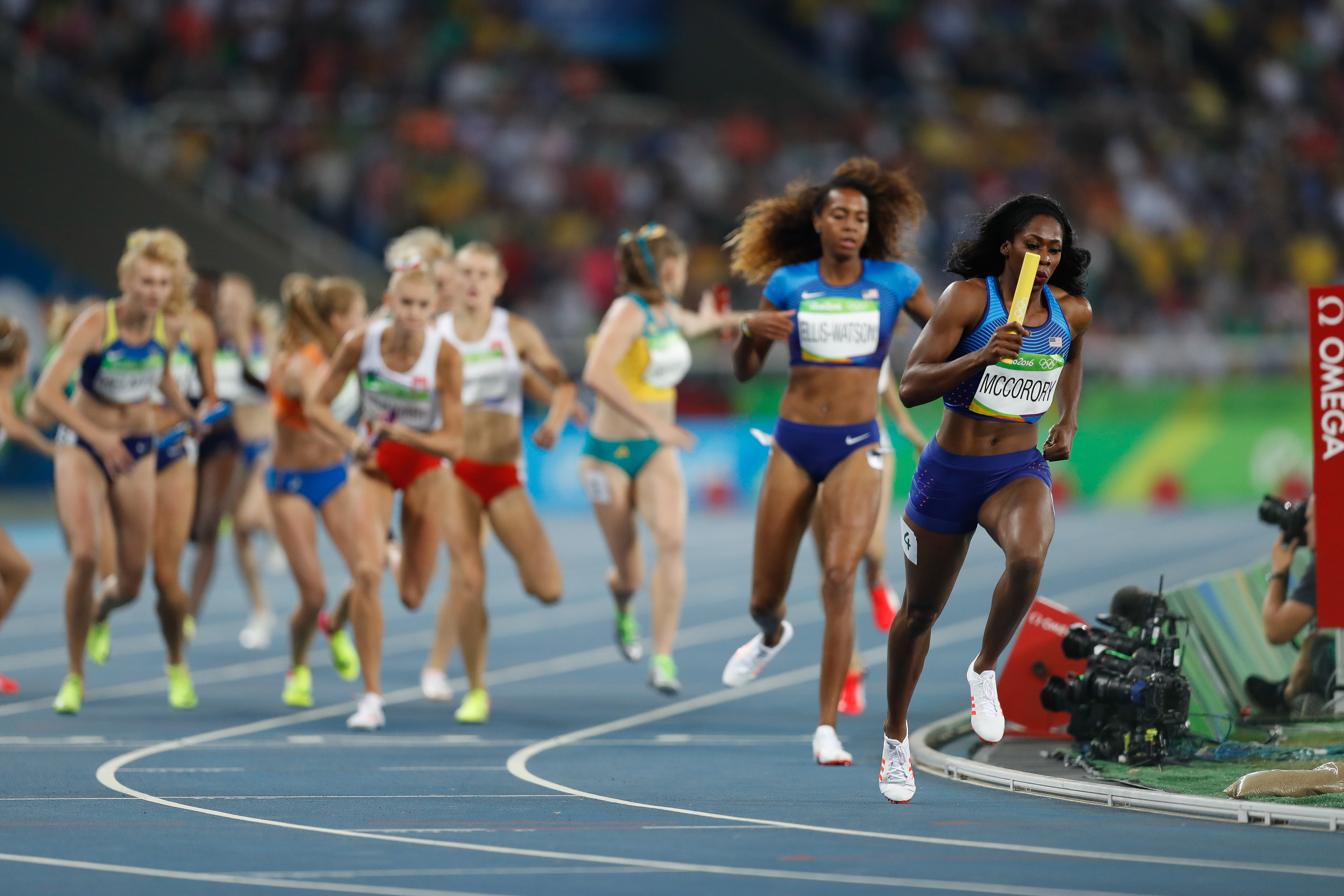
- The United States team leading the heat 1
- Venue: Olympic Stadium
- Date: 19–20 August 2016
- Competitors: from 16 nations
- Teams: 16
- Winning time: 3:19.06

Medalists
1st place, gold medalist(s)		Courtney Okolo; Natasha Hastings; Phyllis Francis; Allyson Felix; Taylor Ellis-Watson*; Francena McCorory*	United States
2nd place, silver medalist(s)		Stephenie Ann McPherson; Anneisha McLaughlin-Whilby; Shericka Jackson; Novlene Williams-Mills; Christine Day*; Chrisann Gordon*	Jamaica
3rd place, bronze medalist(s)		Eilidh Doyle; Anyika Onuora; Emily Diamond; Christine Ohuruogu; Kelly Massey*	Great Britain

Video on YouTube Official Video Highlights

The women's 4 × 400 metres relay competition at the 2016 Summer Olympics in Rio de Janeiro, Brazil was held at the Estádio Olímpico João Havelange on 19–20 August.

== Summary ==
The United States entered as the defending Olympic champions while Jamaica was the reigning world champions from 2015, having defeated the Americans there. Great Britain entered with the fastest time recorded that year (3:25.05 minutes), which it had achieved to win the 2016 European title. France and Canada were the next strongest entries.

In the final, Stephenie Ann McPherson of Jamaica went out hard from the gun, chipping into the huge 3-turn stagger gap. By the end of the second turn she was almost side-by-side with American Courtney Okolo. Down the home stretch, Okolo accelerated and pulled away from McPherson. The USA exchanged first, followed closely by Jamaica. Already with a gap back to Eilidh Doyle, Great Britain and Canada were the next to exchange. American Natasha Hastings was first to the break and Anneisha McLaughlin-Whilby dropped in about 5 meters behind. Anyika Onuora was more than ten meters behind Jamaica by the time the British broke. Canada was next and a rush around the turn by Patrycja Wyciszkiewicz dropped Poland in closely behind. Through the turn McLaughlin-Whilby progressively closed the gap on Hastings, while the rest of the field fell another ten meters behind the leaders. Onuora slowed further on the home stretch, with Canada's Alicia Brown passing her on the outside and Wyciszkiewicz pulling up on her shoulder.

The USA exchanged first, though with only a 2-meter lead on Jamaica. Seconds later Canada was the next to exchange over Poland with Iga Baumgart running into the back of Brown, losing a step to dance away. Up front, USA's Phyllis Francis again opened up a gap on Jamaica's Shericka Jackson around the turn. She held the gap to the half way mark, then Jackson began to close it down. Behind them, Caitlin Sargent-Jones brought Australia around Great Britain and past Poland. After getting passed, Britain's Emily Diamond sparked up and passed both Poland and Australia, setting her marks on Canada's Noelle Montcalm, 5 meters ahead. Coming into the handoff, the bronze medalist Jackson closed down to within a meter of Francis. 40 meters back, Diamond had gotten past Canada. Sargent-Jones' exuberance brought Australia into the handoff last.

At the 2015 World Championships, Novlene Williams-Mills overtook Francena McCorory, securing a victory for Jamaica over the U.S. This came despite Allyson Felix's remarkable 47.7-second leg, which was the second fastest in history, leading up to the handoff. In this race, the veteran Williams-Mills, at 34 the oldest woman in this race, was matched directly against Felix. And well behind them, Britain's hopes were in the hands of their veteran Christine Ohuruogu. All the way down the backstretch, Williams-Mills kept closing the gap, inching closer to Felix. By the middle of the final turn, it looked like Williams-Mills was about to move into the perfect position to pass Felix coming off the turn. Instead, Felix started to accelerate, the gap began to open wider. From less than a meter, Felix continued to run away, opening up to 8 meters by the finish for a clear American victory. Well behind them, in the battle for bronze, Olha Zemlyak came from seventh place to run Ukraine past Poland, Italy and Canada to get right behind Ohuruogu, but Ohuruogu stood firm through the final turn. As Zemlyak moved to Ohuruogu's shoulder to attack coming off the turn, instead Canada's Sage Watson went around Zemlyak and Ohuruogu ran away, opening up a four-metre gap to take bronze for Britain.

The gold medal was Felix's sixth Olympic gold medal and also the ninth overall Olympic medal of her career, tying her with Merlene Ottey as the most decorated woman in track and field history. Ottey, however, never won Olympic gold. Furthermore, the gold medal was the sixth straight Olympic victory for the United States in this event.

Later, the medals for the competition were presented by IOC member Angela Ruggiero, and the gifts were presented by IAAF Council Member Stephanie Hightower.

== Records ==
Prior to the competition, the existing World and Olympic records were as follows.

World record	Soviet Union (Tatyana Ledovskaya, Olga Nazarova, Mariya Pinigina, Olga Bryzgina)	3:15.17	Seoul, South Korea	1 October 1988
Olympic record	Soviet Union (Tatyana Ledovskaya, Olga Nazarova, Mariya Pinigina, Olga Bryzgina)	3:15.17	Seoul, South Korea	1 October 1988
2016 World leading	Great Britain (Emily Diamond, Anyika Onuora, Eilidh Doyle, Seren Bundy-Davies)	3:25.05	Amsterdam, Netherlands	10 July 2016

The following national records were established during the competition:

Country	Athletes	Round	Time	Notes
Netherlands	Madiea Ghafoor, Lisanne de Witte, Nicky van Leuveren, Laura de Witte (NED)	Heats	3:26.98	
Italy	Maria Benedicta Chigbolu, Maria Enrica Spacca, Ayomide Folorunso, Libania Grenot (ITA)	Heats	3:25.16	
Bahamas	Lanece Clarke, Anthonique Strachan, Carmiesha Cox, Christine Amertil (BAH)	Heats	3:26.36	

== Schedule ==
All times are Brazil time (UTC−3)

Date	Time	Round
Friday, 19 August 2016	20:40	Heats
Saturday, 20 August 2016	22:00	Finals

== Results ==
=== Heats ===
Qualification: First 3 in each heat (Q) and the next 2 fastest (q) advance to the Final

==== Heat 1 ====
Rank	Lane	Nation	Competitors	Time	Notes
1	4	United States	Courtney Okolo, Taylor Ellis-Watson, Francena McCorory, Phyllis Francis	3:21.42	Q, SB
2	8	Ukraine	Alina Logvynenko, Olha Bibik, Tetiana Melnyk, Olha Zemlyak	3:24.54	Q, SB
3	2	Poland	Małgorzata Hołub, Patrycja Wyciszkiewicz, Iga Baumgart, Justyna Święty	3:25.34	Q, SB
4	1	Australia	Jessica Thornton, Anneliese Rubie, Caitlin Sargent-Jones, Morgan Mitchell	3:25.71	q, SB
5	3	France	Phara Anacharsis, Brigitte Ntiamoah, Marie Gayot, Floria Gueï	3:26.18	
6	6	Netherlands	Madiea Ghafoor, Lisanne de Witte, Nicky van Leuveren, Laura de Witte	3:26.98	NR
7	5	Romania	Adelina Pastor, Anamaria Ioniță, Andrea Miklós, Bianca Răzor	3:29.87	
8	7	Brazil	Joelma Sousa, Geisa Coutinho, Leticia de Souza, Jailma de Lima	3:30.27	SB

==== Heat 2 ====
Rank	Lane	Nation	Competitors	Time	Notes
1	4	Jamaica	Christine Day, Anneisha McLaughlin-Whilby, Chrisann Gordon, Novlene Williams-Mills	3:22.38	Q, SB
2	2	Great Britain	Emily Diamond, Anyika Onuora, Kelly Massey, Christine Ohuruogu	3:24.81	Q, SB
3	8	Canada	Carline Muir, Alicia Brown, Noelle Montcalm, Sage Watson	3:24.94	Q, SB
4	3	Italy	Maria Benedicta Chigbolu, Maria Enrica Spacca, Ayomide Folorunso, Libania Grenot	3:25.16	q, NR
5	5	Germany	Laura Muller, Friederike Möhlenkamp, Lara Hoffmann, Ruth Spelmeyer	3:26.02	SB
6	6	Bahamas	Lanece Clarke, Anthonique Strachan, Carmiesha Cox, Christine Amertil	3:26.36	NR
7	1	India	Nirmala Sheoran, Tintu Lukka, Poovamma Raju Machettira, Anilda Thomas	3:29.53	
8	7	Cuba	Lisneidy Veitia, Gilda Casanova, Roxana Gomez, Daisurami Bonne	3:30.11	SB

=== Final ===
Rank	Lane	Nation	Competitors	Time	Notes
1st place, gold medalist(s)	6	United States	Courtney Okolo, Natasha Hastings, Phyllis Francis, Allyson Felix	3:19.06	SB
2nd place, silver medalist(s)	5	Jamaica	Stephenie Ann McPherson, Anneisha McLaughlin-Whilby, Shericka Jackson, Novlene Williams-Mills	3:20.34	SB
3rd place, bronze medalist(s)	3	Great Britain	Eilidh Doyle, Anyika Onuora, Emily Diamond, Christine Ohuruogu	3:25.88	
4	7	Canada	Carline Muir, Alicia Brown, Noelle Montcalm, Sage Watson	3:26.43	
DSQ	4	Ukraine	Alina Lohvynenko, Olha Bibik, Tetyana Melnyk, Olha Zemlyak	3:26.64	
5	1	Italy	Maria Benedicta Chigbolu, Maria Enrica Spacca, Ayomide Folorunso, Libania Grenot	3:27.05	
6	8	Poland	Małgorzata Hołub, Patrycja Wyciszkiewicz, Iga Baumgart, Justyna Święty	3:27.28	
7	2	Australia	Jessica Thornton, Anneliese Rubie, Caitlin Sargent, Morgan Mitchell	3:27.45	
