= Marie Gayot =

French sprinter (born 1989)

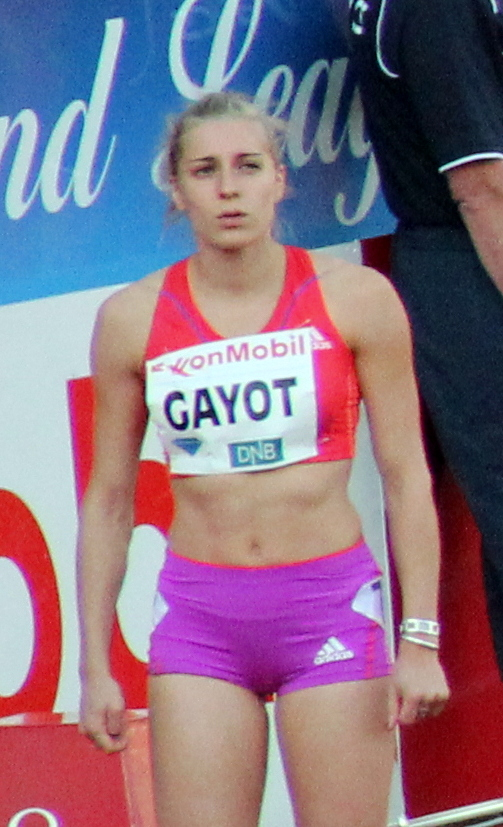
- Gayot at the 2012 Bislett Games

Personal information
- Born: 18 February 1989 (age 37) Reims, Marne, France
- Height: 1.71 m (5 ft 7 in)
- Weight: 58 kg (128 lb)

Sport
- Country: France
- Sport: Athletics
- Event: 4 × 400 m Relay
Medal record
World Championships
Bronze medal – third place	2013 Moscow	4 × 400 m relay
European Championships
Gold medal – first place	2014 Zürich	4 × 400 m
Silver medal – second place	2012 Helsinki	4 × 400 m relay
Silver medal – second place	2016 Amsterdam	4 × 400 m relay
European Indoor Championships
Gold medal – first place	2015 Prague	4 × 400 m relay
Bronze medal – third place	2011 Paris	4 × 400 m relay

Marie Gayot (born 18 December 1989 in Reims) is a retired French sprint athlete. She specialized in 400 m and set her personal best of 50.97s in 2015 World Championships in Athletics in Beijing. She holds a master's degree in urbanism from Cergy-Pontoise University.

== Competition record ==
She has represented France in the 4 × 400 m relay in London Olympic games where she was a finalist. Her best results include a bronze medal in 2013 World Championships in Athletics in the 4 × 400 m, which was given to her in 2017 after disqualification of the Russian team; and a gold medal in 4 × 400 m in 2015 European Athletics Indoor Championships. She has also participated in World Championships in 2011 and 2015.

Year	Competition	Venue	Position	Event	Notes
Representing France
2007	European Junior Championships	Hengelo, Netherlands	5th	400 m	53.98
2007	European Junior Championships	Hengelo, Netherlands	4th	4 × 400 m relay	3:37.82
2011	European Indoor Championships	Paris, France	3rd	4 × 400 m relay	3:32.16
2011	European U23 Championships	Ostrava, Czech Republic	6th	400 m	53.86
2011	European U23 Championships	Ostrava, Czech Republic	3rd	4 × 400 m relay	3:31.73
2011	World Championships	Daegu, South Korea	14th (h)	4 × 400 m relay	3:28.02
2012	European Championships	Helsinki, Finland	9th (sf)	400 m	52.17
2012	European Championships	Helsinki, Finland	2nd	4 × 400 m relay	3:25.49
2012	Olympic Games	London, United Kingdom	6th	4 × 400 m relay	3:25.92
2013	European Indoor Championships	Gothenburg, Sweden	10th (sf)	400 m	53.38
2013	European Indoor Championships	Gothenburg, Sweden	4th	4 × 400 m relay	3:28.71
2013	World Championships	Moscow, Russia	14th (sf)	400 m	51.54
2013	World Championships	Moscow, Russia	3rd	4 × 400 m relay	3:24.21
2013	Jeux de la Francophonie	Nice, France	2nd	400 m	52.33
2014	IAAF World Relays	Nassau, Bahamas	4th	4 × 400 m relay	3:25.84
2014	European Championships	Zürich, Switzerland	7th	400 m	52.14
2014	European Championships	Zürich, Switzerland	1st	4 × 400 m relay	3:24.28
2015	European Indoor Championships	Prague, Czech Republic	5th	400 m	53.11
2015	European Indoor Championships	Prague, Czech Republic	1st	4 × 400 m relay	3:31.61
2015	World Championships	Beijing, China	12th (sf)	400 m	50.97
2015	World Championships	Beijing, China	7th	4 × 400 m relay	3:26.45
2016	European Championships	Amsterdam, Netherlands	2nd	4 × 400 m relay	3:25.96
2016	Olympic Games	Rio de Janeiro, Brazil	10th (h)	4 × 400 m relay	3:26.18
