= Kona Hislop =

English footballer (born 1970)

Personal information
- Full name: Terence Kona Hislop
- Date of birth: 21 December 1970 (age 55)
- Place of birth: Hackney, England
- Position: Midfielder

College career
Years	Team	Apps	(Gls)
1988	Syracuse Orange		
- Howard Bison

Senior career*
Years	Team	Apps	(Gls)
1995–1996	Livingston	4	(1)
1996–1997	Hartlepool United	27	(0)
- Blyth Spartans
- * Club domestic league appearances and goals

Terence Kona Hislop (born 21 December 1970) is an English former footballer who played as a midfielder for Livingston.

== Playing career ==
Hislop began college career at Syracuse University in 1988, playing for the Syracuse Orange. He studied at Howard University, Washington, D.C. and played football for Howard Bison.

Hislop began his professional career playing at Livingston and made 4 appearances for Livi, scoring one goal.

The winger signed for Hartlepool United in 1996 and appeared 27 times. It was to be his only season for the club, before leaving in the summer of 1997.

He signed for Blyth Spartans after his departure from Victoria Park.

== Coaching career ==
As of 2024, Hislop is coaching in Trinidad and Tobago for Pro Series, a local youth team.

== Personal life ==
Kona is the brother of former West Ham and Trinidad and Tobago goalkeeper, Shaka Hislop, and the cousin of American sprinter Natasha Hastings.
