= Keshia Baker =

American track and field athlete

Personal information
- Other names: Keshia Kirtz
- Born: Keshia Chantay Baker; January 30, 1988 (age 38) Fairfield, California, U.S.
- Height: 5 ft 7 in (1.7 m)
- Weight: 137 lb (62 kg)

Sport
- Country: United States
- Sport: Athletics
- Event: 4 × 400 m Relay
Medal record
Olympic Games
Gold medal – first place	2012 London	4 × 400 m relay
World Championships
Gold medal – first place	2011 Daegu	4 × 400 m relay

Keshia Chantay Baker (born January 30, 1988, in Fairfield, California), also known as Keshia Kirtz, is an American track and field athlete. She competed at the 2012 Summer Olympics in the 4 × 400 m relay event, running in the heats and winning a gold medal.

While running for her home town Fairfield High School, she finished third in the 400 meters at the 2006 CIF California State Meet. She had been a finalist the previous two years. Then she ran for the University of Oregon. At the 2010 NCAA Championships, she anchored Oregon's winning 4 × 400 relay team to victory, while finishing fourth in the open 400 meters. Earlier in the season, she was runner up in 400 meters at the NCAA Indoor Championships, both times behind future Olympic teammate Francena McCorory.
