= Esther Cremer =

German sprinter

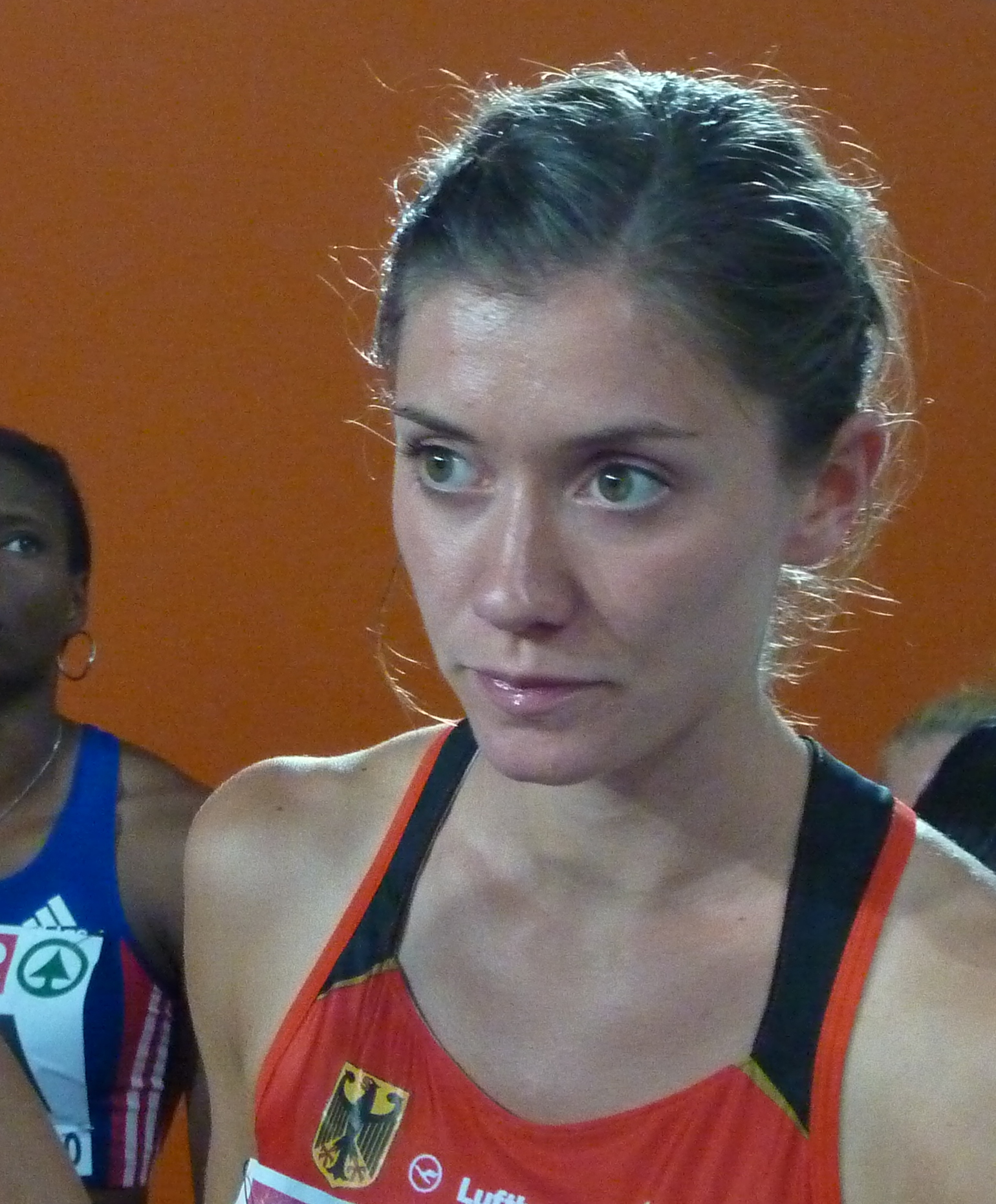
- Cremer at the 2010 European Athletics Championships

Personal information
- Full name: Esther Cremer
- Born: 29 March 1988 (age 38) Cologne, West Germany
- Height: 1.70 m (5 ft 7 in)

Sport
- Country: Germany
- Sport: Athletics
- Event: 400 metres

Achievements and titles
- Personal best(s): 400 metres: 51.76 (Rehlingen, May 2012)
Medal record
European Championships
Gold medal – first place	2010 Barcelona	4 × 400 m relay

Esther Cremer (born 29 March 1988 in Cologne) is a German athlete who specialises in the 400 metres.

She came fifth in the 2009 World Championships in Athletics – Women's 4 × 400 metres relay, and won silver relay medals at the 2009 European Athletics U23 Championships and the 2010 European Team Championships.

== Competition record ==
Year	Competition	Venue	Position	Event	Notes
Representing Germany
2007	European Junior Championships	Hengelo, Netherlands	3rd	4 × 400 m relay	3:37.32
2009	European U23 Championships	Kaunas, Lithuania	2nd	4 × 400 m relay	3:29.21
2009	World Championships	Berlin, Germany	5th	4 × 400 m relay	3:27.61
2010	European Championships	Barcelona, Spain	2nd	4 × 400 m relay	3:24.07
2011	World Championships	Daegu, South Korea	11th (h)	4 × 400 m relay	3:27.31
2012	European Championships	Helsinki, Finland	11th (sf)	400 m	52.77
2012	European Championships	Helsinki, Finland	5th	4 × 400 m relay	3:27.81
2012	Olympic Games	London, United Kingdom	14th (h)	4 × 400 m relay	3:31.06
2013	World Championships	Moscow, Russia	22nd (sf)	400 m	52.42
2014	World Indoor Championships	Sopot, Poland	9th (sf)	400 m	53.60
2014	European Championships	Zürich, Switzerland	12th (sf)	400 m	52.83
2014	European Championships	Zürich, Switzerland	6th	4 × 400 m relay	3:27.69
