= Maria Enrica Spacca =

Italian sprinter

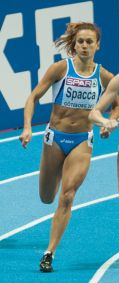
- Maria Enrica Spacca in 2013.

Personal information
- Nationality: Italian
- Born: March 20, 1986 (age 40) L'Aquila, Italy
- Height: 1.64 m (5 ft 4 1/2 in)
- Weight: 52 kg (115 lb)

Sport
- Country: Italy
- Sport: Athletics
- Event: 400 metres
- Club: G.S. Forestale
- Coached by: Roberto Bonomi

Achievements and titles
- Personal best: 400 m: 52.53 (2012)
Medal record
European Championships
Bronze medal – third place	2010 Barcelona	4 × 400 m relay
Bronze medal – third place	2016 Amsterdam	4 × 400 m relay
European Team Championships
Silver medal – second place	2009 Leiria	4 × 400 m relay
Mediterranean Games
Gold medal – first place	2013 Mersin	4 × 400 m relay

Maria Enrica Spacca (L'Aquila, 20 March 1986) is an Italian sprinter (400 m). She was a component of the national relay team that holds the two Italian records (outdoor and indoor) at the 4 × 400 m relay.

== Biography ==
In her career she has twice won the national championships. She has 24 caps for the national team from 2006.

== National records ==
- 4 × 400 metres relay: 3:25.71 ( (Spain) Barcelona, 1 August 2010) - with Chiara Bazzoni, Marta Milani, Libania Grenot
- 4 × 400 metres relay indoor: 3:31.99 ( (Poland) Sopot, 8 March 2014) - with Chiara Bazzoni, Marta Milani, Elena Maria Bonfanti
- 4 × 400 metres relay indoor: 3:31.55 ( (United Kingdom) Birmingham, 4 March 2018) - current holder with Ayomide Folorunso, Raphaela Lukudo, Chiara Bazzoni

== Achievements ==
Year	Competition	Venue	Position	Event	Time	Notes
2009	World Championships	(Germany) Berlin	Heats	4 × 400 m relay	3:31.05	
2010	European Championships	(Spain) Barcelona	3rd	4 × 400 m relay	3:25.71	
2011	European Indoor Championships	(France) Paris	4th	4 × 400 m relay	3:33.70	
2011	World Championships	(South Korea) Daegu	Heat	4 × 400 m relay	3:26.48	
2012	World Indoor Championships	(Turkey) Istanbul	Heat	4 × 400 m relay	3:31.05	
2012	Summer Olympics	(United Kingdom) London	Heat	4 × 400 m relay	3:29.01	
2012	European Championships	(Finland) Helsinki	SF	400 metres	53.02	
2013	Mediterranean Games	(Turkey) Mersin	1st	4 × 400 m relay	3.32.44	
2013	World Championships	(Russia) Moscow	Final	4 × 400 m relay	NM	DQ
2014	World Relays	(The Bahamas) Nassau	6th	4 × 400 m relay	3.27.44	
2016	European Championships	(Netherlands) Amsterdam	3rd	4 × 400 m relay	3.27.49	
2016	Olympic Games	(Brazil) Rio de Janeiro	6th	4 × 400 m relay	3.27.05	

== National titles ==
- 1 win at the 400 metres at the Italian Athletics Championships (2012)
- 1 win at the 400 metres at the Italian Athletics Indoor Championships (2012)

== See also ==
- Italian records in athletics
- Italian all-time lists - 4x400 metres hurdles
