= Floria Gueï =

French sprinter (born 1990)

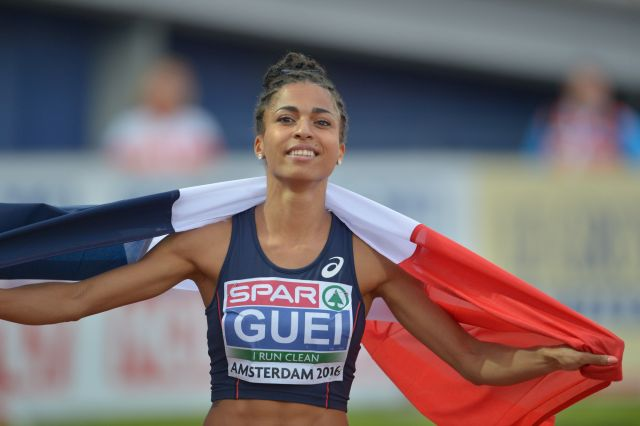
- Gueï at the 2016 European Championships in Amsterdam

Personal information
- Born: 2 May 1990 (age 36) Nantes, France
- Height: 1.66 m (5 ft 5 in)
- Weight: 52 kg (115 lb)

Sport
- Country: France
- Sport: Track and field
- Event: 400 metres
- Club: E.S.L. Pierre-Bénite Athlétisme

Achievements and titles
- Personal bests: 400 m: 50.84 s (2016); 4 × 400 m: 3:24.21 (2013); Indoor; 400 m: 51.90i s (2017)
Medal record
Women's athletics
Representing France
World Championships
Bronze medal – third place	2013 Moscow	4 × 400 m relay
European Championships
Gold medal – first place	2014 Zürich	4 × 400 m relay
Silver medal – second place	2012 Helsinki	4 × 400 m relay
Silver medal – second place	2016 Amsterdam	400 m
Silver medal – second place	2016 Amsterdam	4 × 400 m relay
Silver medal – second place	2018 Berlin	4 × 400 m relay
European Indoor Championships
Gold medal – first place	2015 Prague	4 × 400 m relay
Gold medal – first place	2017 Belgrade	400 m
Bronze medal – third place	2011 Paris	4 × 400 m relay

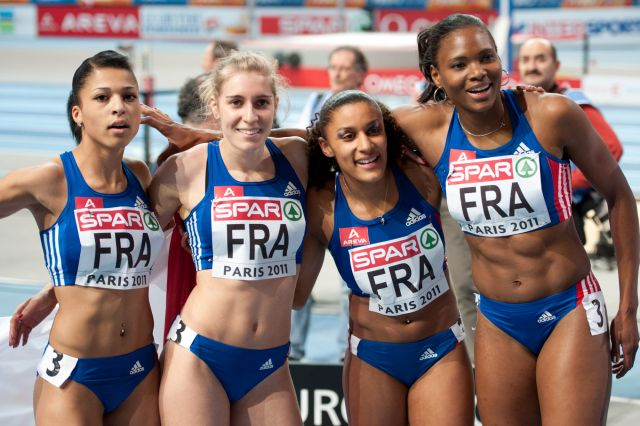
Gueï (left) in the relay squad at the 2011 European Indoor Championships

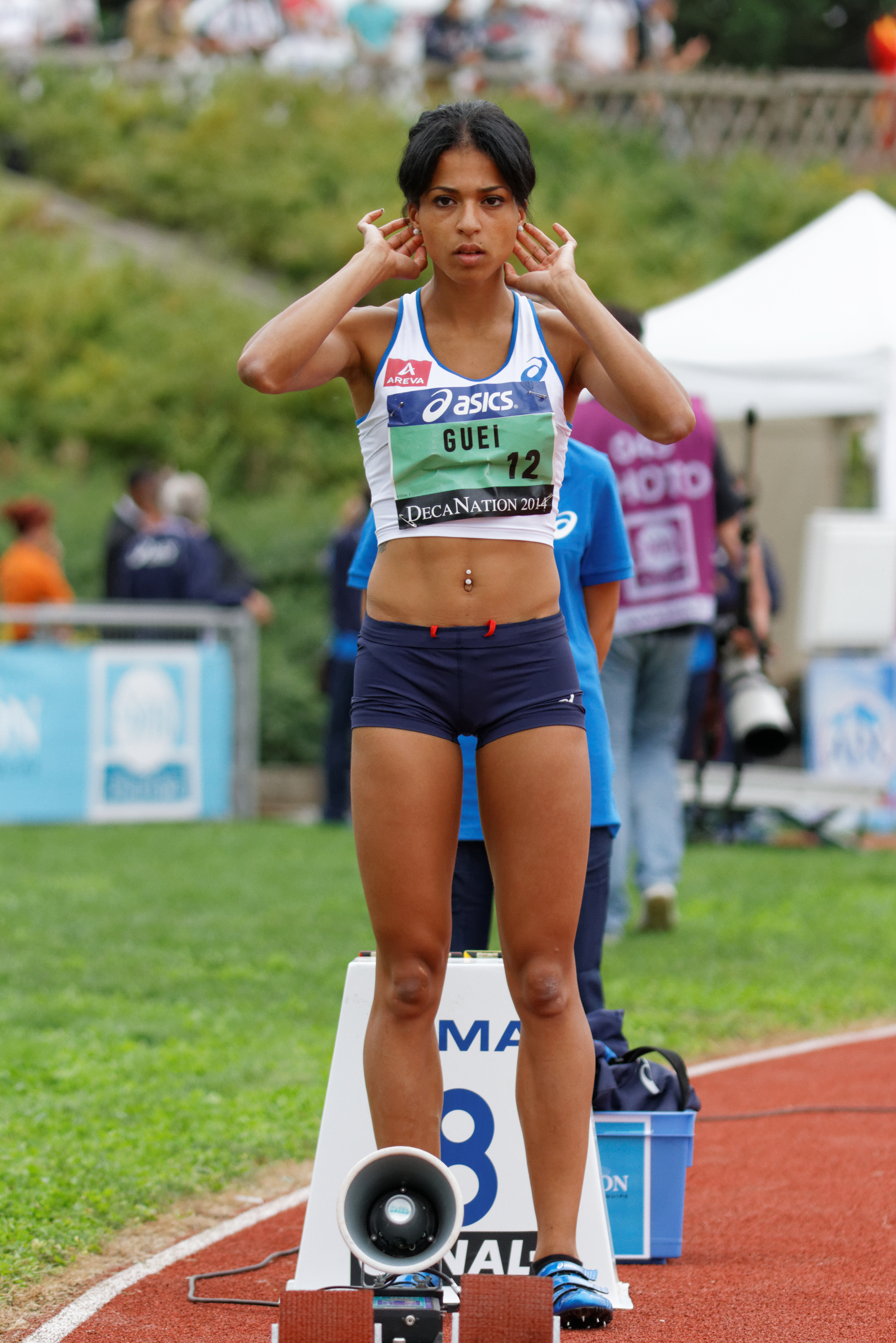
Gueï at the 2014 DécaNation

Floria Gueï (pronounced [flɔʁja ɡe.i]; born 2 May 1990) is a French sprint athlete of Ivorian (father) and French (Breton mother) origin specialising in the 400 metres. A 2016 European Championships silver medallist and a 2017 European Indoor Championships gold medallist, she also won as a member of women's 4 × 400 m relays a bronze at the 2013 World Championships and medals at several other international competitions.

Gueï is known for her remarkable last leg at the 2014 European Championships relay final, when she went from fourth to first in the last 50 metres of the race.

== Career ==
Gueï has won 4 medals in the 4 × 400 metres relay at the consecutive European Championships in 2012–18; three silver and a gold in 2014.

She was first selected for the event's French A team in 2010, when she ran in the heats.

In August 2014 at the European Championships in Zurich Floria Gueï ran one of the most remarkable final legs of a 4 × 400 m relay ever seen. She took the baton in fourth place approximately a second behind the three leading runners from the UK, Russia and Ukraine, each of whom had run faster than Gueï in the individual 400 m event at the Championships. With 200 m remaining she still appeared out of medal contention but finished with a sprint in which she passed all the other athletes in the last 50 m to win the race for France at the last stride by 0.05 seconds. Her time for the leg was 49.71, almost two seconds faster than her personal best of 51.42 at the time, prompting the exclamation from an ecstatic French TV commentator "but that is not possible!" (mais ce n'est pas possible!).

In July 2016, Gueï won a silver medal in the 400 metres at the European Championships. She won a gold medal in the event at the 2017 European Indoor Championships.

In July 2017, Gueï announced her withdrawal from the 2017 World Championships due to medical issues.

In July 2018, she finished second in the 400 metres at the World Cup, and returned later that evening to anchor the 4 × 400 metres relay with remarkable run, pulling France from a distant fifth to take a bronze medal.

In February 2019, Gueï announced her pregnancy on her Instagram account, and gave birth to a boy on 23 April. She then returned to training, and took part in two competitions in 2020.

She qualified for the 4 × 400 m relay at the 2021's 2020 Tokyo Olympics.

== Achievements ==
=== International competitions ===
Representing France
Year	Competition	Venue	Position	Event	Notes
2007	European Youth Olympic Festival	Belgrade, Serbia	2nd	4 × 100 m	46.43
2008	World Junior Championships	Bydgoszcz, Poland	27th (h)	400 m	55.74
2008	World Junior Championships	Bydgoszcz, Poland	4th	4 × 400 m	3:35.83
2010	European Championships	Barcelona, Spain	5th	4 × 400 m	3:29.25 (Note: Time from the heats; Gueï was replaced in the final)
2011	European Indoor Championships	Paris, France	3rd	4 × 400 m	3:32.16
2011	European U23 Championships	Ostrava, Czech Republic	12th (h)	400 m	54.09
2011	European U23 Championships	Ostrava, Czech Republic	3rd	4 × 400 m	3:31.73
2011	World Championships	Daegu, South Korea	14th (h)	4 × 400 m	3:28.02
2012	European Championships	Helsinki, Finland	2nd	4 × 400 m	3:25.49
2012	Olympic Games	London, United Kingdom	5th	4 × 400 m	3:25.92
2013	World Championships	Moscow, Russia	12th (sf)	400 m	51.42
2013	World Championships	Moscow, Russia	3rd	4 × 400 m	3:24.21
2013	Francophone Games	Nice, France	1st	400 m	52.31
2013	Francophone Games	Nice, France	3rd	4 × 400 m	3:35.20
2014	World Relays	Nassau, Bahamas	4th	4 × 400 m	3:25.84
2014	European Championships	Zürich, Switzerland	11th (sf)	400 m	52.82
2014	European Championships	Zürich, Switzerland	1st	4 × 400 m	3:24.28
2015	European Indoor Championships	Prague, Czech Republic	6th (sf)	400 m	53.00
2015	European Indoor Championships	Prague, Czech Republic	1st	4 × 400 m	3:31.61
2015	World Championships	Beijing, China	15th (sf)	400 m	51.30
2015	World Championships	Beijing, China	7th	4 × 400 m	3:26.45
2016	European Championships	Amsterdam, Netherlands	2nd	400 m	51.21
2016	European Championships	Amsterdam, Netherlands	2nd	4 × 400 m	3:25.96
2016	Olympic Games	Rio de Janeiro, Brazil	11th (sf)	400 m	51.08
2016	Olympic Games	Rio de Janeiro, Brazil	10th (h)	4 × 400 m	3:26.18
2017	European Indoor Championships	Belgrade, Serbia	1st	400 m	51.90 PB
2017	European Indoor Championships	Belgrade, Serbia	5th	4 × 400 m	3:33.61
2017	World Relays	Nassau, Bahamas	8th	4 × 400 m	3:35.03
2018	World Cup	London, United Kingdom	2nd	400 m	51.84
2018	World Cup	London, United Kingdom	3rd	4 × 400 m	3:25.91
2018	European Championships	Berlin, Germany	7th	400 m	51.57
2018	European Championships	Berlin, Germany	2nd	4 × 400 m	3:27.17
2021	World Relays	Chorzów, Poland	8th	4 × 400 m	3:30.46
2021	Olympic Games	Tokyo, Japan	11th (h)	4 × 400 m	3:25.07

=== Circuit wins ===
- Diamond League meetings
  - 2016 (1) (400 m): Birmingham British Grand Prix

=== National titles ===
- French Athletics Championships
  - 400 m (4): 2013, 2015, 2016, 2018
    Four-times runner-up in the distance (2012, 2014, 2017, 2021).
  - 400 m indoor (1): 2011
