= Dorothé Évora =

Portuguese sprinter

Dorothé Évora (born 28 May 1991) is a Portuguese sprinter who specializes in the 400 metres.

In the 4 × 400 metres relay she finished fifth at the 2011 European U23 Championships and won a gold medal at the 2018 Ibero-American Championships She also competed at the 2014 European Championships, the 2016 European Championships, the 2018 World Indoor Championships and the 2018 European Championships without reaching the final. At the 2018 World Indoor Championships the team did however set a new Portuguese indoor record of 3:35.43 minutes.

Her personal best time is 53.54 seconds, achieved in July 2018 in Schifflange.

She is the sister of Nelson Évora.
