= Chiara Bazzoni =

Italian sprinter

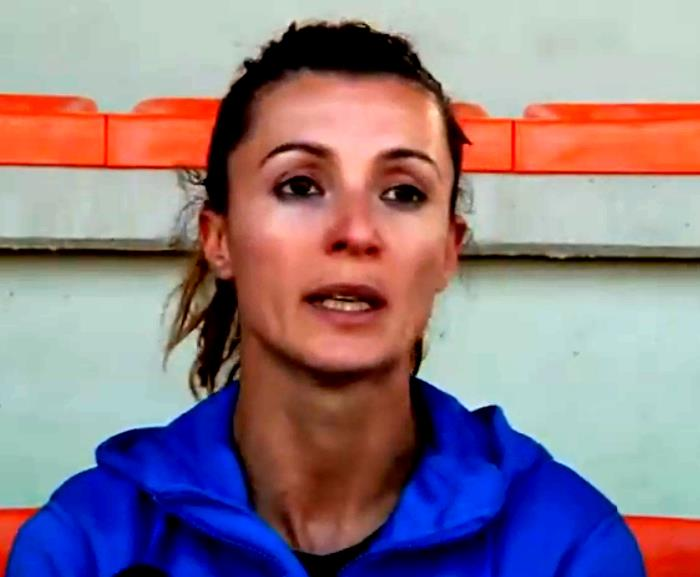
- Chiara Bazzoni in 2017.

Personal information
- Nationality: Italian
- Born: 5 July 1984 (age 41) Arezzo, Italy
- Height: 1.72 m (5 ft 7 1/2 in)
- Weight: 58 kg (128 lb)

Sport
- Country: Italy
- Sport: Athletics
- Event: 400 metres
- Club: C.S. Esercito

Achievements and titles
- Personal bests: 400 m: 52.06 (2013); 400 m indoor: 53.34 (2014)
Medal record
European Championships
Bronze medal – third place	2010 Barcelona	4 × 400 m relay
Bronze medal – third place	2016 Amsterdam	4 × 400 m relay
European Indoor Championships
Bronze medal – third place	2019 Glasgow	4 × 400 m relay
World Athletics Relays
Bronze medal – third place	2019 Yokohama	4 × 400 m relay
Mediterranean Games
Gold medal – first place	2013 Mersin	400 metres
Gold medal – first place	2013 Mersin	4 × 400 m relay

Chiara Bazzoni (Arezzo, 5 July 1984) is an Italian sprinter (400 m). She was a component of the national relay team that holds the two Italian records (outdoor and indoor) on 4 × 400 m relay.

== Biography ==
She has 9 caps in national team from 2006.

== National records ==
- 4 × 400 metres relay: 3:25.71 ( (Spain) Barcelona, 1 August 2010) - with Maria Enrica Spacca, Marta Milani, Libania Grenot
- 4 × 400 metres relay indoor: 3:31.99 ( (Poland) Sopot, 8 March 2014) - with Maria Enrica Spacca, Marta Milani, Elena Maria Bonfanti
- 4 × 400 metres relay indoor: 3:31.55 ( (United Kingdom) Birmingham, 4 March 2018) - current holder with Ayomide Folorunso, Raphaela Lukudo, Maria Enrica Spacca

== Achievements ==
Year	Competition	Venue	Position	Event	Performance	Notes
2010	European Championships	(Spain) Barcelona	3rd	4 × 400 m relay	3:25.71	
2011	European Indoor Championships	(France) Paris	4th	4 × 400 m relay	3:33.70	
2011	European Team Championships	(Sweden) Stockholm	6th	4 × 400 m relay	3:30.11	
2011	World Championships	(South Korea) Daegu	Heats	4 × 400 m relay	3:26.48	
2012	World Indoor Championships	(Turkey) Istanbul	Heats	4 × 400 m relay	3:31.05	
2012	European Championships	(Finland) Helsinki	Heats	400 m	53.92	
2013	Mediterranean Games	(Turkey) Mersin	1st	400 m	52.06	
2013	Mediterranean Games	(Turkey) Mersin	1st	4 × 400 m relay	3:32.44	
2014	European Championships	(Switzerland) Zürich	Semifinal	400 m	53.50	
2014	European Championships	(Switzerland) Zürich	7th	4 × 400 m relay		
2016	European Championships	(Netherlands) Amsterdam	3rd	4 × 400 m relay	3:27.49	
2019	European Indoor Championships	(United Kingdom) Glasgow	3rd	4 × 400 m relay	3:31.90	
2019	World Athletics Relays	(The Bahamas) Nassau	3rd	4 × 400 m relay	3:27.74	(Note: She competed in the battery (team time 3:29.08), but she was still awarded the medal.)

== National titles ==
She has won the individual national championship 4 times.

- 1 win in the 400 metres (2013)
- 2 wins in the 400 metres indoor (2013, 2014, 2015)

== See also ==
- Italian records in athletics
- Italy national relay team
