= Margaret Adeoye =

British sprinter (born 1985)

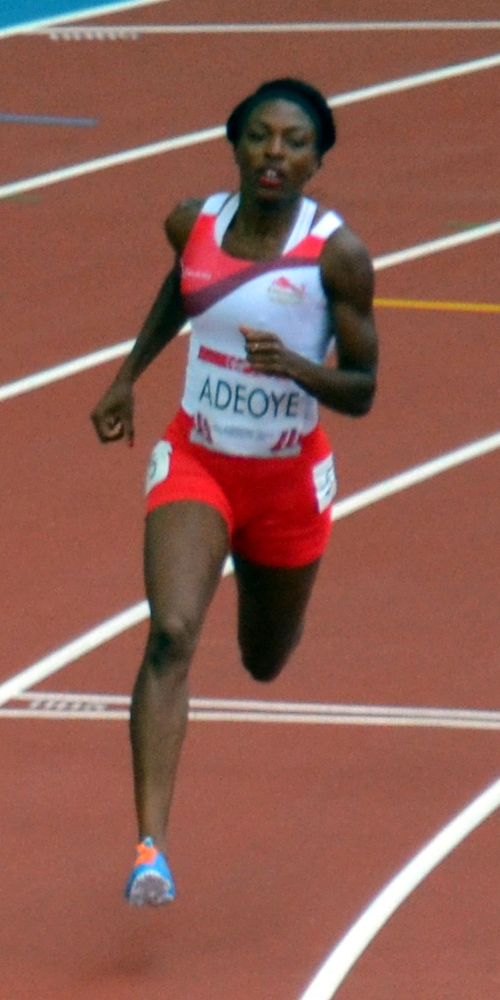
- Adeoye in the 400m heats at the Commonwealth Games 2014

Personal information
- Born: 22 April 1985 (age 41) Lagos, Nigeria
- Height: 1.76 m (5 ft 9 in)
- Weight: 62 kg (137 lb)

Sport
- Country: United Kingdom
- Sport: Athletics
- Event: 200 metres
- Club: Enfield and Haringey Athletic Club
- Coached by: Linford Christie, Charles Van Commenee

Achievements and titles
- Olympic finals: London 2012 (SF)
- Personal best: 22.88s
Medal record
World Championships
Silver medal – second place	2013 Moscow	4 × 400 m relay
World Indoor Championships
Bronze medal – third place	2014 Sopot	4×400 m relay
European Championships
Bronze medal – third place	2014 Zürich	4 x 400 m

Margaret Adetutu Adeoye (born 22 April 1985) is a British track and field athlete who competes in the 200 metres. She represented Great Britain at that distance at London 2012.

Her then personal best for the 200m was gained on 6 August 2012 when she ran the distance in 22.94s, giving her a place in the Olympic 200m Semi-Finals. She finished 7th in the Semi-Finals, and didn't progress into the finals. In 2013, she managed to improve her personal best to 22.88.

== Early life and education ==
Adeoye graduated from the University of Surrey.

== International competitions ==
Year	Competition	Venue	Position	Event	Notes
Representing Great Britain
2013	World Championships	Moscow, Russia	3rd	4 × 400 m relay	3:25:29
2014	World Indoor Championships	Sopot, Poland	3rd	4 × 400 m relay	3:27.56
2015	World Championships	Beijing, China	24th (sf)	200 m	23.34
