= Lara Hoffmann =

German sprinter (born 1991)

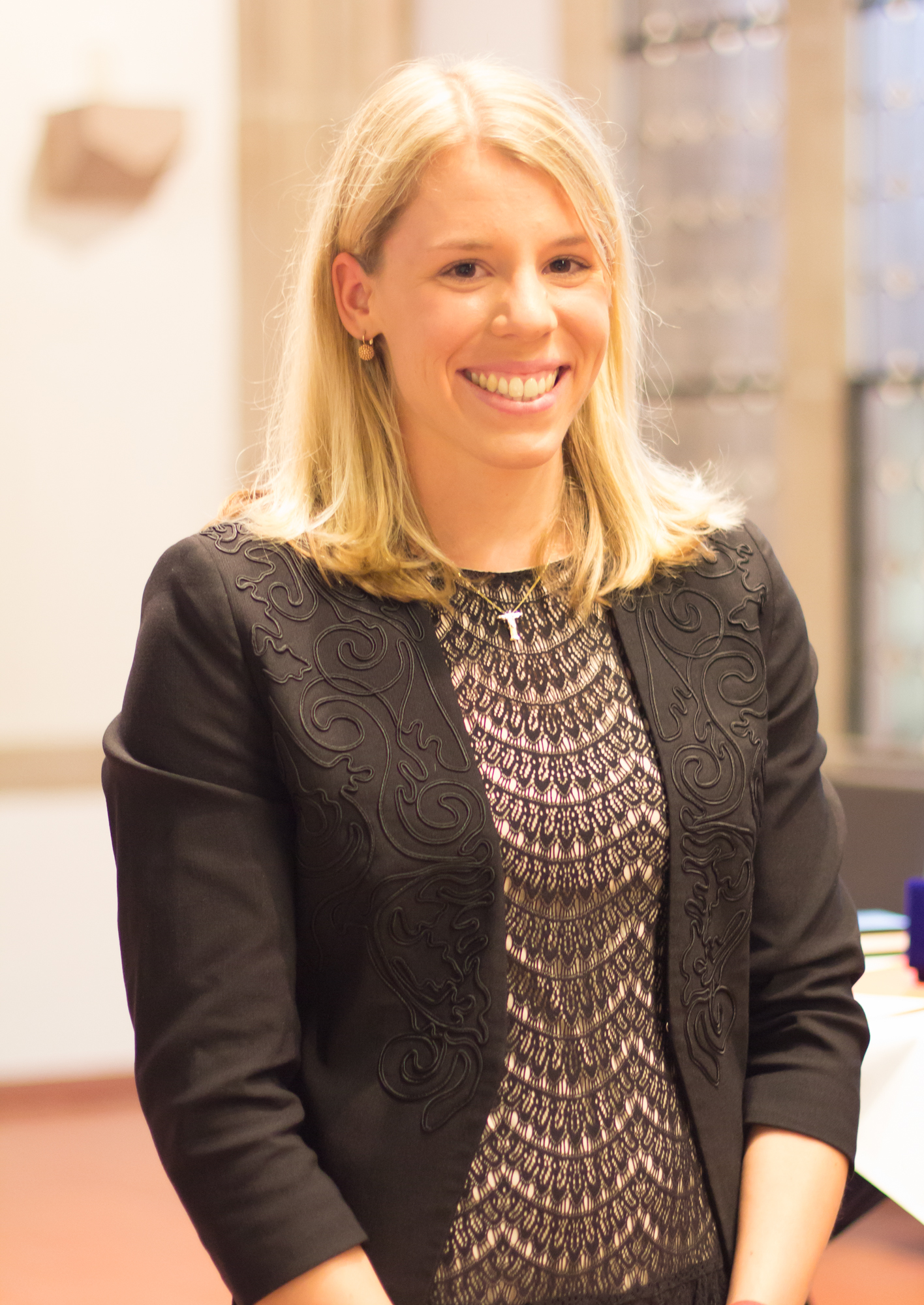
- Hoffmann in 2016

Personal information
- Born: 25 March 1991 (age 34)
- Height: 1.73 m (5 ft 8 in)
- Weight: 68 kg (150 lb)

Sport
- Country: Germany
- Sport: Track and field
- Event: 4 × 400 metres relay

Lara Hoffmann (born 25 March 1991) is a German sprinter. She competed in the 4 x 400 metres relay at the 2016 Summer Olympics. The team finished 5th in their heat and did not advance to the final.
