= Natasha Hastings =

American track and field sprinter

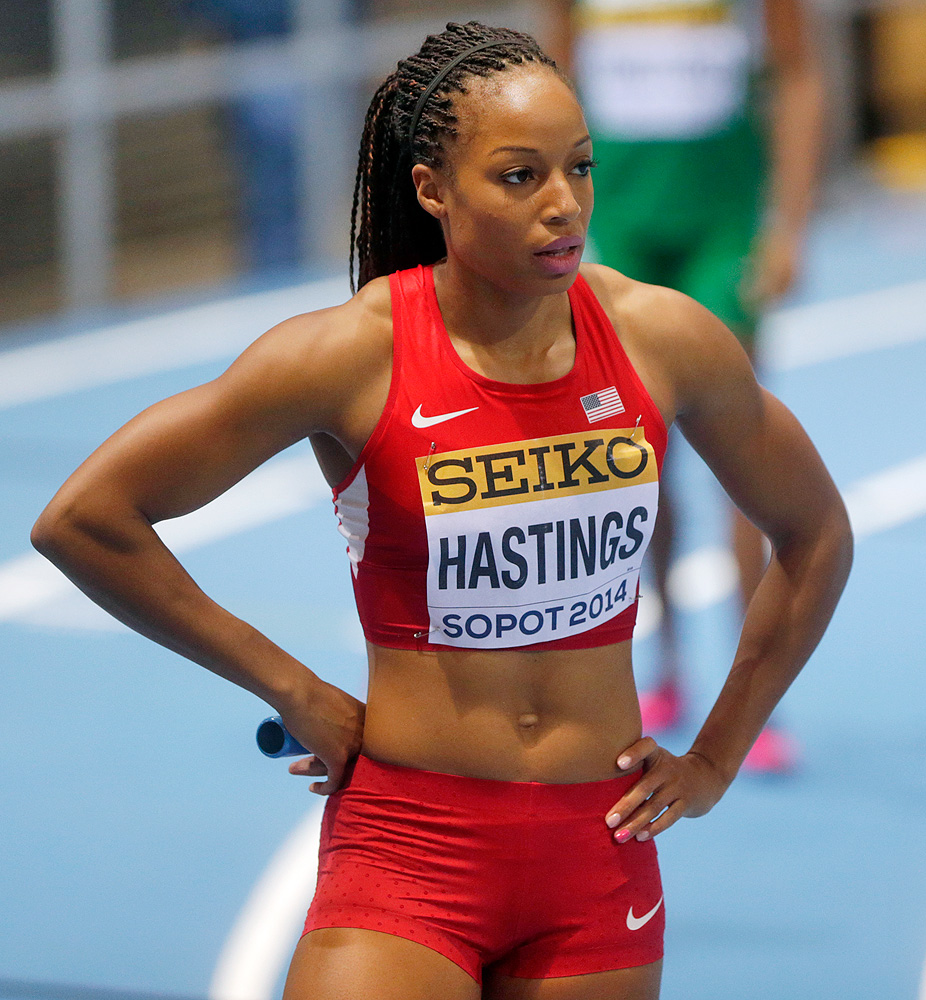
- Hastings at the 2014 IAAF World Indoor Championships

Personal information
- Nationality: American
- Born: July 23, 1986 (age 40) Brooklyn, New York, U.S.
- Height: 5 ft 8 in (173 cm)
- Weight: 135 lb (61 kg)

Sport
- Sport: Running
- Events: 100 metres, 200 metres, 400 metres
- College team: University of South Carolina

Achievements and titles
- Personal bests: 100 m: 11.24 s (Walnut, CA 2013); 200 m: 22.57 s (Nassau 2016); 400 m: 49.84 s (Indianapolis 2007)
Medal record
Olympic Games
Gold medal – first place	2008 Beijing	4 × 400 m relay
Gold medal – first place	2016 Rio de Janeiro	4 × 400 m relay
World Championships
Gold medal – first place	2007 Osaka	4 × 400 m relay
Gold medal – first place	2009 Berlin	4 × 400 m relay
Gold medal – first place	2011 Daegu	4 × 400 m relay
Gold medal – first place	2013 Moscow	4 × 400 m relay
Gold medal – first place	2017 London	4 × 400 m relay
Silver medal – second place	2015 Beijing	4 × 400 m relay
World Indoor Championships
Gold medal – first place	2010 Doha	4 × 400 m relay
Gold medal – first place	2014 Sopot	4 × 400 m relay
Gold medal – first place	2016 Portland	4 × 400 m relay
Silver medal – second place	2012 Istanbul	4 × 400 m relay
Bronze medal – third place	2012 Istanbul	400 m
World Relay Championships
Gold medal – first place	2014 Nassau	4 × 400 m relay
Gold medal – first place	2015 Nassau	4 × 400 m relay
Gold medal – first place	2017 Nassau	4 × 400 m relay
World Junior Championships
Gold medal – first place	2004 Grosseto	400 m
Gold medal – first place	2004 Grosseto	4 × 400 m relay
Pan American Junior Championships
Gold medal – first place	2003 Bridgetown	4 × 400 m relay
Gold medal – first place	2005 Windsor	400 m
Gold medal – first place	2005 Windsor	4 × 400 m relay
World Youth Championships
Gold medal – first place	2003 Sherbrooke	400 m
Gold medal – first place	2003 Sherbrooke	Medley relay

Natasha Monique Hastings (born July 23, 1986) is an American retired 400 meter track and field sprinter. She is a two-time Olympic champion and five-time world champion in the 4 × 400 meter relay.

== Career ==
Hastings began her track career at a very early age and made a first place win at the USATF Junior Olympics in the 400 metres in the Youth Girls division. She attended A. Philip Randolph Campus High School in Harlem, New York, where she was able to take her track and field interest to a more competitive level.

Hastings attended the University of South Carolina to work under Curtis Frye. There, Hastings started to become known as "the 400M Diva" after accidentally describing the ladies track team as the "Gamecock Divas" in honor of the school's mascot, the Gamecock. After coming back from a key injury, 2007 was considered Hastings' breakout year. Hastings went home to New York for the New Balance Collegiate Invitational and won the 400 m race in 51.70, a personal record at the time, and anchored the 4 × 400 m to a win with the fastest collegiate time for the year. Also in 2007, she won the SEC Championships by running a 50.84. Hastings went on to win the NCAA Championship title and her time in the 400 m at 50.15 was the second fastest time ever on the collegiate level and she had successfully competed undefeated all season becoming the Indoor and Outdoor 400 m champion.

In 2008 at the age of 22, Hastings made the USA Olympic Track and Field Team. She won an Olympic gold medal in the Women's 4 × 400 m relay team by running a 49.97 split in heat two at the 2008 Summer Olympics, where the United States won their heat in 3:22.45 with the team of Mary Wineberg, Monique Henderson, Hastings, and Sanya Richards-Ross. Hastings was replaced in the final by Allyson Felix as the U.S. won gold in 3:18.54. Athletes who run in the heats for medal-winning teams are awarded a medal.

In 2013 Hastings won the USATF 400 meters outdoor title in 49.94 on 22 June 2013, thus making the US Track and Field Team for the 2013 World Championships in Athletics in Moscow, where she finished in fourth place.

In 2015 Hastings also made the US Track and Field Team for the 2015 World Championships in Athletics in Beijing. She finished 5th in her semifinal and did not advance to the final. She was part of the 4 × 400 meters women team and they finished in second place for a silver medal.

In 2016, Natasha Hastings qualified for the 2016 Rio Olympics, finishing third in the US trials with a time of 50.17 seconds in the 400 m. In Rio, Hastings finished fourth in the final of the 400 m, running the race in 50.34 seconds.

At the 2016 Great North City Games in the UK, Hastings ran a personal best of 16.67 in a 150 m straight track race, finishing second.

In 2017, Hastings won the 400 m at the Golden Gala meet in Rome, with a time of 50.52 seconds. She ran a season's best of 50.14 in the 400 m at the 2017 USA Outdoor Track and Field Championships, finishing fourth.

At the end of the 2022 season Hastings announced her retirement from the sport in an Instagram post.

== Personal ==
Hastings has a YouTube channel, which includes behind the scenes footage of her races, workouts, and preparation. She also has a series of videos called "Tea Time", during which she talks about topics ranging from dating to mental preparation, often with friends and fellow athletes such as Michelle Carter. She was engaged to former NFL cornerback, William Gay, from July 2018 to 2020, but the couple never married. They have one son together.

She is the cousin of former Trinidad and Tobago goalkeeper Shaka Hislop and his brother Kona Hislop.

Her mother, Joanne, was one of the United Kingdom's top junior sprinters before she emigrated to the USA.
