= Libania Grenot =

Italian sprinter

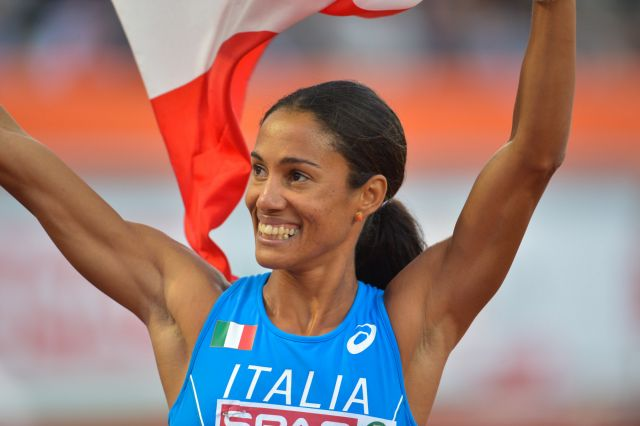
- Grenot after winning the 400 metres at the 2016 European Championships

Personal information
- Full name: Libania Grenot Martinez
- National team: Cuba (2003-2007); Italy: 25 caps (2008-2019)
- Citizenship: Italian (since 2008); Cuban
- Born: 12 July 1983 (age 43) Santiago de Cuba, Cuba
- Height: 1.75 m (5 ft 9 in)
- Weight: 61 kg (134 lb)

Sport
- Sport: Track and field
- Event: Sprint
- Retired: 2019

Achievements and titles
- Personal bests: 200 m: 22.56 (2016); 400 m: 50.30 (2009); 4 × 400 m: 3:25.16 (2016)
Medal record
Women's Athletics
Representing Italy
Event	1st	2nd	3rd
European Championships	2	0	3
Mediterranean Games	2	2	0
Total	4	2	3
European Championships
Gold medal – first place	2014 Zürich	400 m
Gold medal – first place	2016 Amsterdam	400 m
Bronze medal – third place	2010 Barcelona	400 m
Bronze medal – third place	2010 Barcelona	4 × 400 m
Bronze medal – third place	2016 Amsterdam	4 × 400 m
Mediterranean Games
Gold medal – first place	2009 Pescara	400 m
Gold medal – first place	2018 Tarragona	4 × 400 m
Silver medal – second place	2013 Mersin	200 m
Silver medal – second place	2018 Tarragona	400 m
Representing Cuba
Event	1st	2nd	3rd
CAC Championships	0	0	2

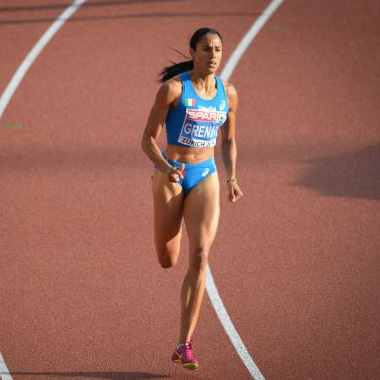
Grenot en route her gold medal at the 2014 European Championships

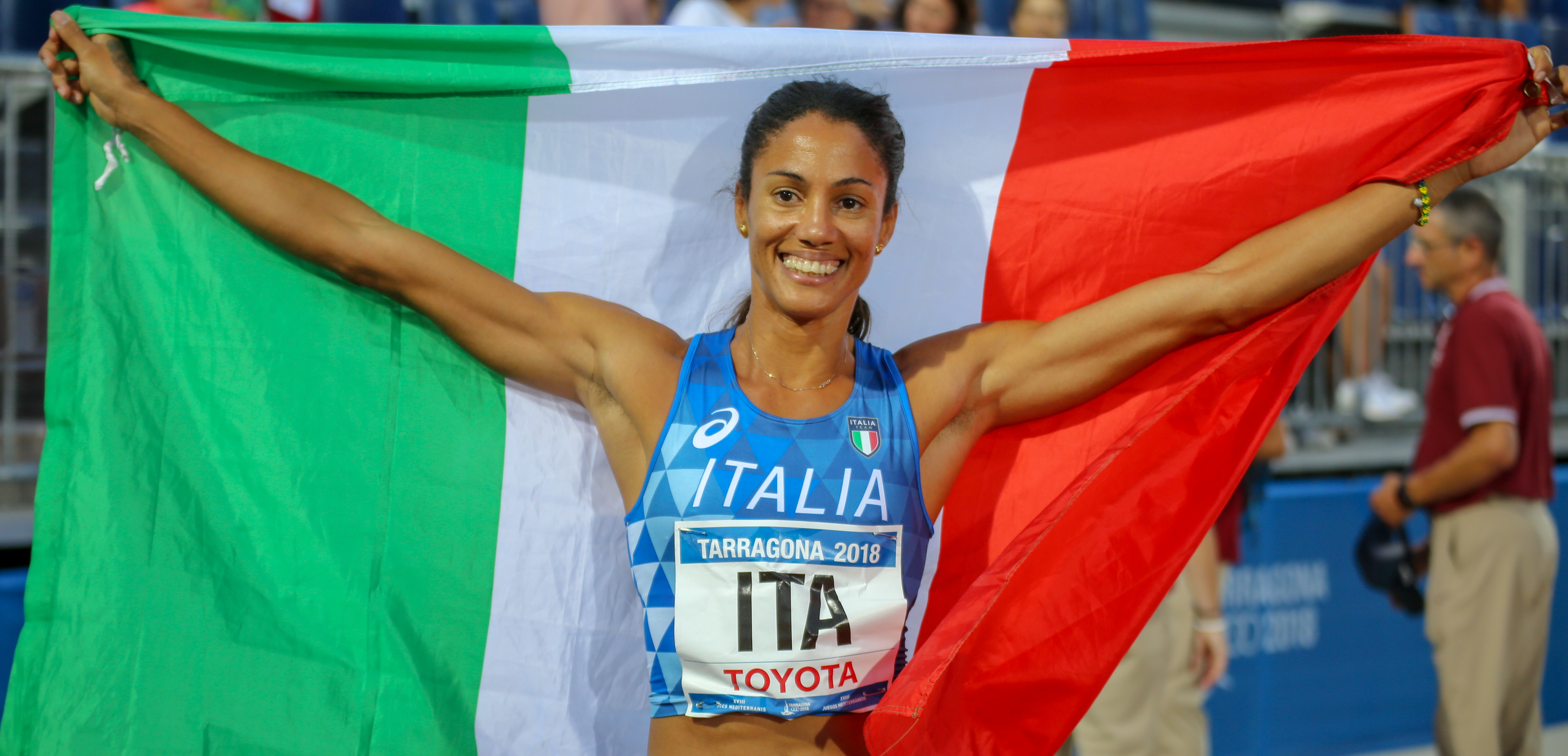
Grenot at the 2018 Mediterranean Games

Libania Grenot Martinez (born 12 July 1983) is a Cuban-born Italian former athlete specialising in the 400 metres. Two times European champion (2014, 2016), she holds the Italian records in the 200 and 400 metres.

== Biography ==
Born in Santiago de Cuba on 12 July 1983, Grenot started running at the age of 9. In 2003–05, she was a Cuban champion in the 400 metres. In 2006, she married an Italian man and relocated to Casal Palocco, a XXXIV zone of Rome.

Grenot acquired Italian citizenship in 2008, and that same year, she broke an Italian record in the 400 meters with a time of 51.05 s and then 50.83 seconds. The latter performance took place at the Beijing Olympics during the semi-final, but despite this effort she did not reach the final. In 2009, she won a gold medal in the distance at the XVI Mediterranean Games with a time of 50.30 s, a new Italian record.

In 2014, she won a gold medal in the 400 metres at the European Championships, becoming the first Italian woman to win an international track title since 1938. Grenot repeated this achievement two years later.

== Statistics ==
=== International competitions ===
Year	Competition	Venue	Position	Event	Notes
Representing Cuba
1999	World Youth Championships	Bydgoszcz, Poland	5th	400 m	54.43
2001	World Championships	Edmonton, Canada	9th (h)	4 × 400 m	3:28.68
2003	Pan American Games	Santo Domingo, Dom. Rep.	4th	400 m	52.23
2003	Pan American Games	Santo Domingo, Dom. Rep.	5th	4 × 400 m	3:28.79
2005	Central American and Caribbean; Championships	Nassau, Bahamas	3rd	400 m	51.53
2005	Central American and Caribbean; Championships	Nassau, Bahamas	3rd	4 × 400 m	3:33.85
2005	World Championships	Helsinki, Finland	34th (h)	400 m	53.05
Representing Italy
2008	Olympic Games	Beijing, China	10th (sf)	400 m	50.83 NR
2009	Mediterranean Games	Pescara, Italy	1st	400 m	50.30 NR
2009	World Championships	Berlin, Germany	12th (sf)	400 m	50.85
2009	World Championships	Berlin, Germany	12th (h)	4 × 400 m	3:31.05
2010	European Championships	Barcelona, Spain	3rd	400 m	50.43
2010	European Championships	Barcelona, Spain	3rd	4 × 400 m	3:25.71
2011	World Championships	Daegu, South Korea	9th (h)	4 × 400 m	3:26.48
2012	European Championships	Helsinki, Finland	6th	400 m	52.57
2012	European Championships	Helsinki, Finland	10th (h)	4 × 400 m	3:31.64
2012	Olympic Games	London, United Kingdom	9th (sf)	400 m	51.18
2012	Olympic Games	London, United Kingdom	11th (h)	4 × 400 m	3:29.01
2013	Mediterranean Games	Mersin, Turkey	2nd	200 m	23.20
2013	World Championships	Moscow, Russia	8th (sf)	400 m	50.47
2013	World Championships	Moscow, Russia	DQ	4 × 400 m	170.6 (Note: Finishing the race without the baton. 3:29.62 in the heats.)
2014	IAAF World Relays	Nassau, Bahamas	6th	4 × 400 m	3:27.44
2014	European Championships	Zürich, Switzerland	1st	400 m	51.10
2014	European Championships	Zürich, Switzerland	7th	4 × 400 m	3:28.30
2015	World Championships	Beijing, China	14th (sf)	400 m	51.14
2016	European Championships	Amsterdam, Netherlands	1st	400 m	50.73
2016	European Championships	Amsterdam, Netherlands	3rd	4 × 400 m	3:27.49
2016	Olympic Games	Rio de Janeiro, Brazil	8th	400 m	51.25
2016	Olympic Games	Rio de Janeiro, Brazil	5th	4 × 400 m	3:27.05 (Note: Italian squad set the national record in the heats with a time of 3:25.16. It would have been 3rd result in the final)
2017	IAAF World Relays	Nassau, Bahamas	DQ	4 × 100 m	R163.3(A) (Note: Lane infringement)
2017	World Championships	London, United Kingdom	9th (h)	4 × 400 m	3:27.81
2018	Mediterranean Games	Tarragona, Spain	2nd	400 m	51.32
2018	Mediterranean Games	Tarragona, Spain	1st	4 × 400 m	3:28.08
2018	European Championships	Berlin, Germany	9th (sf)	400 m	51.54
2018	European Championships	Berlin, Germany	5th	4 × 400 m	3:28.62

=== National titles ===
Grenot won seven national championships at individual senior level (six as Italian, three as Cuban).

- Italian Athletics Championships
  - 200 m: 2012 (1)
  - 400 m: 2009, 2010, 2014, 2015, 2016 (5)
- Cuban Athletics Championships
  - 400 m: 2003, 2004, 2005 (3)

== See also ==
- Italian all-time lists - 400 metres
- Italian all-time lists - 200 metres
- Italian national track relay team
