= Alena Kiyevich =

Belarusian sprinter

Alena Kiyevich (Belarusian: Алена Кіевіч; born 6 October 1987 in Brest) is a Belarusian sprinter. She competed in the 4 × 400 m relay event at the 2012 Summer Olympics.
