= Anamaria Ioniță =

Romanian athletics competitor

Personal information
- Full name: Anamaria Ioniță
- Born: 7 July 1988 (age 37) Brăila, Romania
- Height: 1.75 m (5 ft 9 in)
- Weight: 60 kg (132 lb)

Sport
- Country: Romania
- Sport: Athletics
- Event(s): 400 metres 400 metres hurdles

Achievements and titles
- Personal bests: 400 m: 52.82 (July 2008); 400 m hurdles: 1:00.86 (June 2005)
Medal record
European Team Championships
Gold medal – first place	2009 Bergen	4 × 400 m relay

Anamaria Ioniță (born 7 July 1988 in Brăila) is a Romanian athlete who specialises in the 400 metres and 400 metres hurdles.

Ioniță represented Romania at the 2010 European Championships in Athletics where she helped her team to the 4 × 400 metres relay final where they finished 8th.
