= Daryna Prystupa =

Ukrainian sprinter

Personal information
- Full name: Daryna Prystupa
- Born: 26 November 1987 (age 38)

Sport
- Country: Ukraine
- Sport: Athletics
- Event: Sprint

Achievements and titles
- Regional finals: 1st at the 2012 European Athletics Championships
Medal record
European Championships
Silver medal – second place	2014 Zürich	4x400 m
European Team Championships
Gold medal – first place	2014 Braunschweig	4x400 m
Bronze medal – third place	2010 Bergen	4x400 m

Daryna Prystupa (Ukrainian: Дарина Приступа; born 26 November 1987) is a Ukrainian athlete who competes in the sprint with a personal best time of 51.70 seconds at the 400 metres event.

Prystupa won the gold medal at the 2012 European Athletics Championships in Helsinki at the 4×400 metres relay. She has competed at the 20th European Athletics Championships.
