= Pınar Saka =

Turkish sprinter (born 1985)

Personal information
- Nationality: Turkish
- Born: 5 November 1985 (age 40) Üsküdar, Istanbul, Turkey
- Height: 163 cm (5 ft 4 in)
- Weight: 53 kg (117 lb)

Sport
- Country: Turkey
- Sport: track and field
- Event(s): 100 m, 200 m and 400 m
- Club: Enkaspor, Istanbul
- Coached by: Öznur Dursun

Achievements and titles
- Personal bests: 100 m 11.93 (2003); 200 m 23.97 (2003); 200 m Indoor 23.90; 400 m 51.53 (2011) NR; 400 m Indoor 52.99 (2011) NR
Medal record
Women's athletics
European Junior Championships
Gold medal – first place	2003Tampere	100 m
Gold medal – first place	2003 Tampere	200 m
Gold medal – first place	2003 Tampere	4 × 400 m relay
Balkan Championships
Gold medal – first place	2004 İstanbul	400 m
Gold medal – first place	2004 İstanbul	4 × 400 m relay
Mediterranean Games
Bronze medal – third place	2005 Almería	4 × 400 m relay
NCAA
Gold medal – first place	2009 Lincoln	400 m
Gold medal – first place	2009 Lincoln	4 × 400 m relay
Universiade
Silver medal – second place	2011 Shenzhen	4 × 400 m relay
European Team Championships
Gold medal – first place	2011 Izmir	4 × 400 m relay
Silver medal – second place	2011 Izmir	400 m

Pınar Saka (born 5 November 1985) is a Turkish female track running athlete in the sprint discipline competing in the categories 100 m, 200 m and 400 m. She is the Turkish national record holder for 400 m. This time is the first time a Turkish woman ran under 52 seconds and also a qualifying mark for Olympics that will be held in London in 2012. She was chosen as Regional Athlete of the Year in Midwest both in 2008 and 2009. There were 8 regional athletes nominated for "National Athlete of the Year" award and in 2009, she receiveds that honor.

Saka was born in Üsküdar, Istanbul. She studied international business at the University of Nebraska Omaha in the USA. The 163 cm (5 ft 4 in) tall athlete at 53 kg (117 lb) is a member of Enkaspor in Istanbul, where she is coached by Öznur Dursun.

Saka participated at the 2005 Mediterranean Games in Almería, Spain in the categories 4 × 100 m relay, 400 m and 4 × 400 m relay. She ran bronze medal in the 4 × 400 m relay in 3:40.75 with her teammates Birsen Bekgöz, Özge Gürler and Binnaz Uslu.

In 2011 Saka won the silver medal at the 26th Summer Universiade in Shenzhen together with a team consisting of Nagihan Karadere, Merve Aydın and Meliz Redif, with a time of 3.31.05.

Saka qualified for participation in the 400 m event at the 2012 Summer Olympics.

She is doing her MBA degree at Boğaziçi University in Istanbul.

== Doping ==
Pınar Saka was in 2013 sanctioned as a result of abnormalities detected in her biological passport. She was disqualified from 18 June 2010 and got three years ineligibility ending 23 May 2015.

== Achievements ==
Her personal best performances are:

- 100 m 11.93 (2003)
- 200 m 23.97 (2003)
- 200 m Indoor 23.90
- 400 m 51.53 (2011) NR
- 400 m Indoor 52.99 (2011) NR

NR: Turkish national record
