= Birsen Bekgöz =

Turkish sprinter (born 1980)

Personal information
- Nationality: Turkish
- Born: October 18, 1980 (age 45)
- Height: 1.73 m (5 ft 8 in)
- Weight: 63 kg (139 lb)

Sport
- Country: Turkey
- Sport: Athletics
- Club: Enkaspor
Medal record
Women's sprint
Representing Turkey
European Team Championships
Bronze medal – third place	2011 Izmir	400 m hurdles
Gold medal – first place	2011 Izmir	4 × 400 m relay
Bronze medal – third place	2010 Budapest	4 × 400 m relay
Islamic Solidarity Games
Gold medal – first place	2013 Palembang	4 × 100 m relay
Silver medal – second place	2013 Palembang	4 × 400 m relay
Mediterranean Games
Silver medal – second place	2013 Mersin	4 × 400 m relay
Bronze medal – third place	2005 Almería	4 × 400 m relay
Turkish Championships
Gold medal – first place	2004	200 m
Gold medal – first place	2004	400 m hurdles
Gold medal – first place	2005	200 m

Birsen Bekgöz (previously known under the married names Birsen Yavuz and Birsen Engin; born October 18, 1980) is a Turkish female track and field athlete competing in sprinting events. She is a member of Enkaspor athletics team. She studied at the Eastern Mediterranean University in Northern Cyprus.

== Career ==
She started her sports career in Ankara and became later a member of the club Bursa Nilüfer Belediyespor. During her time at the Near East University in Nicosia, she ran for Northern Cyprus. Bekgöz is currently at Enkaspor in Istanbul.

She participated at the 2005 Mediterranean Games in Almería, Spain in the categories 200 metres, 400 m hurdles, 4 × 100 m relay and 4 × 400 m relay. She ran bronze medal with her teammates Özge Gürler, Pınar Saka and Binnaz Uslu in 4 × 400 relay. She won the silver medal in the 4 × 400 m relay event with her teammates Özge Akın, Esma Aydemir and Sema Apak at the 2013 Islamic Solidarity Games held in Palembang, Indonesia.

== Achievements ==
Year	Competition	Venue	Position	Event	Notes
2004	Turkish Championships	Turkey	1st	200 m	24.30
2004	Turkish Championships	Turkey	1st	400 m hurdles	58.50
2005	Turkish Championships	Turkey	1st	200 m	24.29
2005	15th Mediterranean Games	Almería, Spain	3rd	4 × 400 m relay	3:40.75l
2010	European Team Championships 1st League	Budapest, Hungary	3rd	4 × 400 m relay	3:33.50
2011	European Team Championships 1st League	İzmir, Turkey	1st	4 × 400 m relay	3:29.40 NR
2011	European Team Championships 1st League	İzmir, Turkey	3rd	400 m hurdles	56.50
2013	17th Mediterranean Games	Mersin, Turkey	2nd	4 × 400 m relay	3:43.61
2013	3rd Islamic Solidarity Games	Palembang, Indonesia	1st	4 × 100 m relay	46.59
2013	3rd Islamic Solidarity Games	Palembang, Indonesia	2nd	4 × 400 m relay	3:53.26
