= Mariya Pinigina =

Soviet sprinter (born 1958)

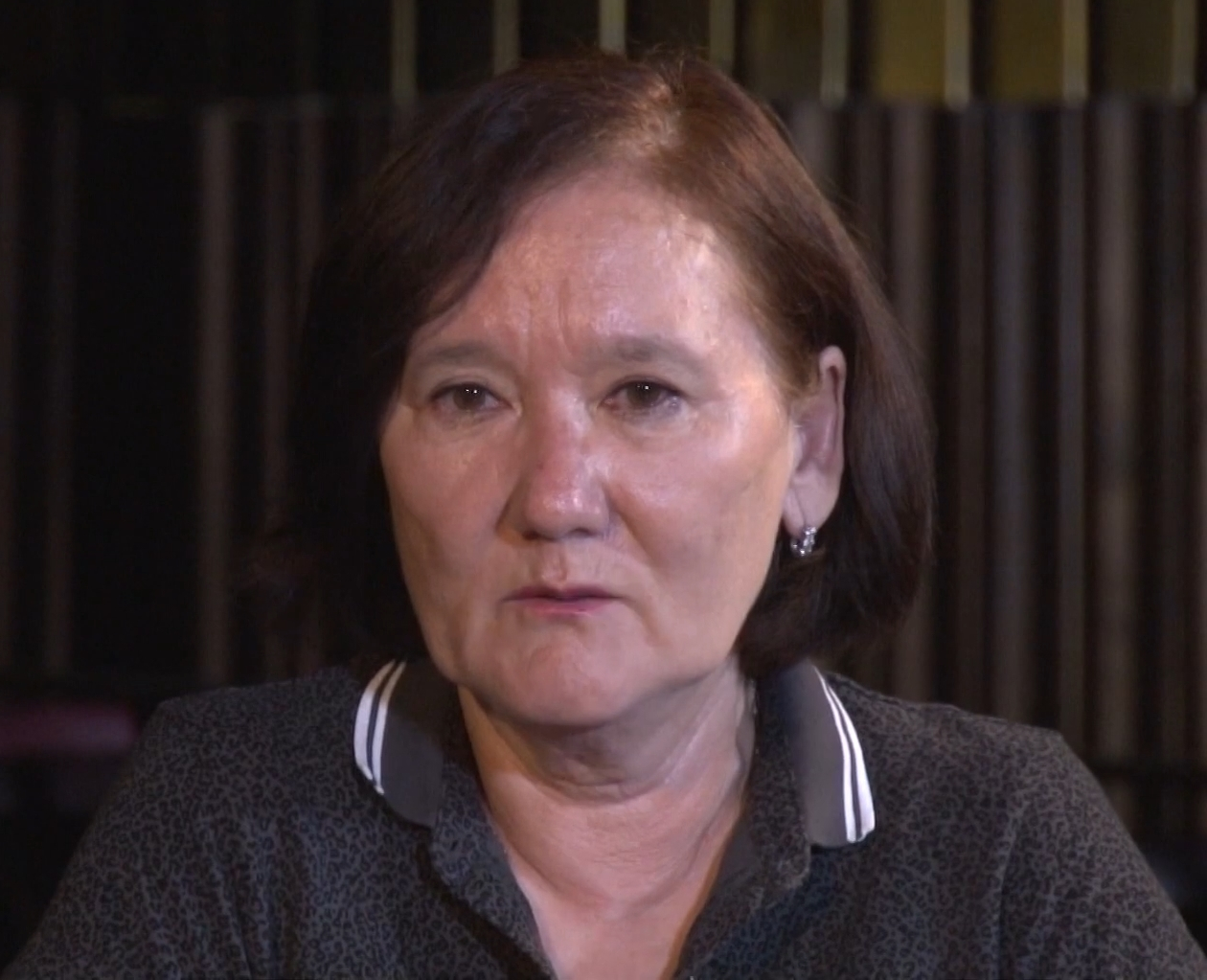
- Mariya Pinigina in 2019

Personal information
- Born: Mariya Kulchunova; 9 February 1958 (age 68) Ivanovka, Kyrgyz SSR, Soviet Union
Medal record
Women's athletics
Representing the Soviet Union
Olympic Games
| Gold medal – first place | 1988 Seoul | 4×400 m relay |
World Championships
| Silver medal – second place | 1987 Rome | 4×400 m relay |
| Bronze medal – third place | 1983 Helsinki | 400 m |
| Bronze medal – third place | 1983 Helsinki | 4×400 m relay |
European Championships
| Silver medal – second place | 1978 Prague | 4×400 m relay |
Summer Universiade
| Gold medal – first place | 1979 Mexico City | 400 m |
| Gold medal – first place | 1983 Edmonton | 400 m |
| Gold medal – first place | 1983 Edmonton | 4 x 400 m relay |

Mariya Dzhumabaevna Pinigina (Мария Джумабаевна Пинигина, née Kulchunova; born 9 February 1958 in Ivanovka, Kyrgyz SSR) is a former Olympic athlete who competed mainly in the 400 metres, training at Spartak in Kyiv. She represented the Soviet Union.

Pinigina competed for USSR in the 1988 Summer Olympics held in Seoul, South Korea in the 4 × 400 metres where she won the gold medal with her teammates 400 m hurdles silver medalist Tatyana Ledovskaya, 400 m bronze medalist Olga Nazarova and olympic 400 m champion Olga Bryzgina. That USSR relay team set a new world record of 3:15.17 minutes which is still unbeaten.

She also won a bronze medal at the 1983 World Championships in Athletics.

In November 2013, she served as one of the torch bearers in Yakutsk for the 2014 Winter Olympics torch relay.

Mariya Pinigina is married to Olympic wrestling champion Pavel Pinigin.
