= 2013 European Athletics U23 Championships – Women's 400 metres =

The Women's 400 metres event at the 2013 European Athletics U23 Championships was held in Tampere, Finland, at Ratina Stadium on 11 and 13 July.

== Medalists ==
Gold	Lénora Guion-Firmin; France
Silver	Mirela Lavric; Romania
Bronze	Justyna Święty; Poland

== Results ==
=== Final ===
13 July 2013

Rank	Name	Nationality	Lane	Reaction Time	Time	Notes
1st place, gold medalist(s)	Lénora Guion-Firmin	France	3	0.159	51.68	PB
2nd place, silver medalist(s)	Mirela Lavric	Romania	5	0.176	52.06	PB
3rd place, bronze medalist(s)	Justyna Święty	Poland	6	0.183	52.22	PB
4	Małgorzata Hołub	Poland	4	0.180	52.28	PB
5	Adelina Pastor	Romania	7	0.199	52.44	PB
6	Madiea Ghafoor	Netherlands	1	0.204	52.52	
7	Yuliya Yurenia	Belarus	2	0.179	52.66	PB
8	Lisanne de Witte	Netherlands	8	0.187	53.97	

=== Heats ===
Qualified: First 2 in each heat (Q) and 2 best performers (q) advance to the Final

==== Summary ====
Rank	Name	Nationality	Time	Notes
1	Justyna Święty	Poland	52.27	Q PB
2	Mirela Lavric	Romania	52.45	Q SB
3	Madiea Ghafoor	Netherlands	52.46	q PB
4	Małgorzata Hołub	Poland	52.76	Q
5	Adelina Pastor	Romania	52.78	Q
6	Lénora Guion-Firmin	France	52.80	Q
7	Yuliya Yurenia	Belarus	52.83	q PB
8	Lisanne de Witte	Netherlands	52.93	Q PB
9	Natália Zsigovics	Hungary	53.45	PB
10	Natalya Danilova	Russia	53.49	
11	Magdalena Gorzkowska	Poland	53.65	
12	Agnès Raharolahy	France	53.67	
13	Liona Rebernik	Slovenia	53.79	
14	Camelia Florina Gal	Romania	53.91	PB
15	Tara Marie Norum	Norway	54.22	
16	Flavia Battaglia	Italy	54.45	
17	Eva Misiūnaitė	Lithuania	54.63	SB
18	Simone Werner	Switzerland	54.79	
19	Marta Maffioletti	Italy	55.07	
20	Hristina Risteska	North Macedonia	59.49	SB

==== Details ====
===== Heat 1 =====
11 July 2013 / 19:35

Rank	Name	Nationality	Lane	Reaction Time	Time	Notes
1	Małgorzata Hołub	Poland	3	0.195	52.76	Q
2	Adelina Pastor	Romania	4	0.184	52.78	Q
3	Yuliya Yurenia	Belarus	6	0.200	52.83	q PB
4	Agnès Raharolahy	France	7	0.267	53.67	
5	Tara Marie Norum	Norway	5	0.205	54.22	
6	Marta Maffioletti	Italy	2	0.206	55.07	

===== Heat 2 =====
11 July 2013 / 19:43

Rank	Name	Nationality	Lane	Reaction Time	Time	Notes
1	Justyna Święty	Poland	2	0.186	52.27	Q PB
2	Mirela Lavric	Romania	3	0.186	52.45	Q SB
3	Madiea Ghafoor	Netherlands	7	0.187	52.46	q PB
4	Liona Rebernik	Slovenia	6	0.162	53.79	
5	Flavia Battaglia	Italy	4	0.211	54.45	
6	Simone Werner	Switzerland	5	0.177	54.79	
7	Hristina Risteska	North Macedonia	8	0.259	59.49	SB

===== Heat 3 =====
11 July 2013 / 19:51

Rank	Name	Nationality	Lane	Reaction Time	Time	Notes
1	Lénora Guion-Firmin	France	8	0.164	52.80	Q
2	Lisanne de Witte	Netherlands	5	0.178	52.93	Q PB
3	Natália Zsigovics	Hungary	4	0.182	53.45	PB
4	Natalya Danilova	Russia	2	0.210	53.49	
5	Magdalena Gorzkowska	Poland	3	0.202	53.65	
6	Camelia Florina Gal	Romania	6	0.159	53.91	PB
7	Eva Misiūnaitė	Lithuania	7	0.166	54.63	SB

== Participation ==
According to an unofficial count, 20 athletes from 13 countries participated in the event.

- Belarus (1)
- France (2)
- Hungary (1)
- Italy (2)
- Lithuania (1)
- North Macedonia (1)
- Netherlands (2)
- Norway (1)
- Poland (3)
- Romania (3)
- Russia (1)
- Slovenia (1)
- Switzerland (1)
