= 2015 European Athletics Indoor Championships – Women's 4 × 400 metres relay =

The women's 4 × 400 metres relay event at the 2015 European Athletics Indoor Championships was held on 8 March at 17:35 local time as a straight final.

== Results ==
Rank	Nationality	Athlete	Time	Notes
1st place, gold medalist(s)	France	Floria Gueï; Elea-Mariama Diarra; Agnès Raharolahy; Marie Gayot	3:31.61	
2nd place, silver medalist(s)	Great Britain	Kelly Massey; Seren Bundy-Davies; Laura Maddox; Kirsten McAslan	3:31.79	
3rd place, bronze medalist(s)	Poland	Joanna Linkiewicz; Małgorzata Hołub; Monika Szczęsna; Justyna Święty	3:31.90	
4	Czech Republic	Denisa Rosolová; Helena Jiranová; Zdeňka Seidlová; Zuzana Hejnová	3:32.08	
5	Ukraine	Nataliya Pyhyda; Nataliya Lupu; Alina Lohvynenko; Yuliya Olishevska	3:32.39	
6	Russia	Karina Triputen; Yekaterina Renzhina; Olga Tovarnova; Yana Glotova	3:32.53	
