= 2013 European Athletics U23 Championships – Women's 4 × 400 metres relay =

The Women's 4x400 metres relay event at the 2013 European Athletics U23 Championships was held in Tampere, Finland, at Ratina Stadium on 14 July.

== Medalists ==
Gold	Magdalena Gorzkowska; Małgorzata Hołub; Agnieszka Karczmarczyk; Justyna Święty; Poland
Silver	Camelia Florina Gal; Mirela Lavric; Sanda Belgyan; Adelina Pastor; Romania
Bronze	Lénora Guion-Firmin; Justine Fedronic; Louise-Anne Bertheau; Agnès Raharolahy; France

== Results ==
=== Final ===
14 July 2013 / 18:40

Rank	Name	Nationality	Lane	Reaction Time	Time	Notes
1st place, gold medalist(s)	Poland	Magdalena Gorzkowska; Małgorzata Hołub; Agnieszka Karczmarczyk; Justyna Święty	7	0.218	3:29.74	NUR
2nd place, silver medalist(s)	Romania	Camelia Florina Gal; Mirela Lavric; Sanda Belgyan; Adelina Pastor	6	0.164	3:30.28	NUR
3rd place, bronze medalist(s)	France	Lénora Guion-Firmin; Justine Fedronic; Louise-Anne Bertheau; Agnès Raharolahy	2	0.206	3:30.64	
4	Ukraine	Anastasiya Lebid; Nataliya Strohova; Olha Lyakhova; Anastasiya Tkachuk	3	0.213	3:31.14	
5	Russia	Mariya Mikhailyuk; Roksana Yurkova; Viktoriya Korotkikh; Natalya Danilova	4	0.202	3:32.32	
	Italy	Marta Maffioletti; Valentina Zappa; Clelia Calcagno; Flavia Battaglia	5	0.250	DQ	R 163.3a

== Participation ==
According to an unofficial count, 24 athletes from 6 countries participated in the event.

- France (4)
- Italy (4)
- Poland (4)
- Romania (4)
- Russia (4)
- Ukraine (4)
