= Magdalena Gorzkowska =

Polish sprinter (born 1992)

Medal record

Women's athletics

Representing Poland

World Indoor Championships
Silver medal – second place	2016 Portland	4 × 400 m relay

Magdalena Gorzkowska (born 30 April 1992) is a Polish 400 metres sprinter turned mountaineer. As an athlete she was a silver medallist in the 4 × 400 metres relay at the 2016 IAAF World Indoor Championships. She holds a personal best of 52.95 seconds for the 400 m. Her accomplishments in mountaineering include ascents of Mont Blanc, Aconcagua, Kilimanjaro, Mount Everest (as the youngest Polish female) and Makalu (first Polish female without supplemental oxygen).

== Biography ==
Born in Bytom and a member of TS AKS Chorzów athletics club, she made her first international appearances with the Polish 4 × 400 metres relay team. They placed eighth at the 2010 World Junior Championships in Athletics then she took her first medal, a silver, at the 2011 European Athletics Junior Championships. A senior debut followed at the 2012 European Athletics Championships, where she ran individually (coming 20th overall) and was eighth in the relay final. Later that season she was part of the Polish delegation for the 2012 Summer Olympics in London but was not selected to run in the relay. An appearance at the 2013 European Athletics U23 Championships brought Gorzkowska her first title, as she led off a team Małgorzata Hołub, Agnieszka Karczmarczyk and Justyna Święty.

Gorzkowska received her first senior medal at the 2016 IAAF World Indoor Championships. Teaming up again with Hołub and Święty and joined by Ewelina Ptak, the Polish quartet held off a challenge from Romania to take the silver medal behind the host nation, the United States.

== International competitions ==
Year	Competition	Venue	Position	Event	Notes
2010	World Junior Championships	Moncton, Canada	8th	4 × 400 m relay	3:42.70
2011	European Junior Championships	Tallinn, Estonia	6th	400 m	54.42
2011	European Junior Championships	Tallinn, Estonia	2nd	4 × 400 m relay	3:35.35
2012	European Championships	Helsinki, Finland	20th (heats)	400 m	53.74
2012	European Championships	Helsinki, Finland	8th	4 × 400 m relay	3:30.17
2013	European U23 Championships	Tampere, Finland	11th (heats)	400 m	53.65
2013	European U23 Championships	Tampere, Finland	1st	4 × 400 m relay	3:29.74
2016	World Indoor Championships	Portland, United States	2nd	4 × 400 m relay	3:31.15
