= 2011 European Athletics U23 Championships – Women's 400 metres =

The Women's 400 metres event at the 2011 European Athletics U23 Championships was held in Ostrava, Czech Republic, at Městský stadion on 14 and 16 July.

== Medalists ==
Gold	Olga Topilskaya; Russia
Silver	Yuliya Terekhova; Russia
Bronze	Lena Schmidt; Germany

== Results ==
=== Final ===
16 July 2011 / 16:30

Rank	Name	Nationality	Lane	Reaction Time	Time	Notes
1st place, gold medalist(s)	Olga Topilskaya	Russia	6	0.178	51.45	
2nd place, silver medalist(s)	Yuliya Terekhova	Russia	4	0.271	52.63	
3rd place, bronze medalist(s)	Lena Schmidt	Germany	3	0.202	52.66	
4	Meliz Redif	Turkey	7	0.238	53.08	
5	Alina Lohvynenko	Ukraine	5	0.169	53.43	
6	Marie Gayot	France	8		53.86	
7	Line Kloster	Norway	2	0.173	54.18	
	Marit Dopheide	Netherlands	1		F1	DQ R 162.7

=== Heats ===
Qualified: First 2 in each heat (Q) and 2 best performers (q) advance to the Final

==== Summary ====
Rank	Name	Nationality	Time	Notes
1	Olga Topilskaya	Russia	51.89	Q
2	Yuliya Terekhova	Russia	52.69	Q
3	Lena Schmidt	Germany	52.75	Q
4	Alina Lohvynenko	Ukraine	53.06	Q
5	Marie Gayot	France	53.08	Q PB
6	Meliz Redif	Turkey	53.11	Q
7	Marit Dopheide	Netherlands	53.44	q
8	Line Kloster	Norway	53.51	q
9	Elea-Mariama Diarra	France	53.99	PB
10	Yuliya Baraley	Ukraine	54.00	
11	Axelle Dauwens	Belgium	54.01	
12	Floria Gueï	France	54.09	
13	Kateryna Plyashechuk	Ukraine	54.14	
14	Liona Rebernik	Slovenia	54.15	
15	Clelia Calcagno	Italy	54.18	
15	Josefin Magnusson	Sweden	54.18	
17	Violeta Metodieva	Bulgaria	54.26	
18	Iga Baumgart	Poland	54.53	
19	Benedicte Hauge	Norway	54.71	SB
20	Cátia Nunes	Portugal	55.13	
21	Viktoryia Manko	Belarus	55.18	
22	Alexandra Štuková	Slovakia	55.36	
23	Shanie Landen	Israel	57.19	

==== Details ====
===== Heat 1 =====
14 July 2011 / 18:45

Rank	Name	Nationality	Lane	Reaction Time	Time	Notes
1	Lena Schmidt	Germany	5	0.227	52.75	Q
2	Marie Gayot	France	3	0.215	53.08	Q PB
3	Yuliya Baraley	Ukraine	6	0.240	54.00	
4	Axelle Dauwens	Belgium	4	0.228	54.01	
5	Josefin Magnusson	Sweden	7	0.245	54.18	
6	Iga Baumgart	Poland	1	0.274	54.53	
7	Benedicte Hauge	Norway	8	0.192	54.71	SB
8	Alexandra Štuková	Slovakia	2	0.196	55.36	

===== Heat 2 =====
14 July 2011 / 18:52

Rank	Name	Nationality	Lane	Reaction Time	Time	Notes
1	Olga Topilskaya	Russia	4	0.189	51.89	Q
2	Alina Lohvynenko	Ukraine	3	0.201	53.06	Q
3	Marit Dopheide	Netherlands	5	0.152	53.44	q
4	Floria Gueï	France	6	0.220	54.09	
5	Liona Rebernik	Slovenia	8	0.195	54.15	
6	Clelia Calcagno	Italy	7	0.246	54.18	
7	Viktoryia Manko	Belarus	2	0.242	55.18	

===== Heat 3 =====
14 July 2011 / 18:59

Rank	Name	Nationality	Lane	Reaction Time	Time	Notes
1	Yuliya Terekhova	Russia	3	0.265	52.69	Q
2	Meliz Redif	Turkey	5	0.273	53.11	Q
3	Line Kloster	Norway	4	0.165	53.51	q
4	Elea-Mariama Diarra	France	2	0.254	53.99	PB
5	Kateryna Plyashechuk	Ukraine	6	0.279	54.14	
6	Violeta Metodieva	Bulgaria	8	0.212	54.26	
7	Cátia Nunes	Portugal	7	0.242	55.13	
8	Shanie Landen	Israel	1	0.458	57.19	

== Participation ==
According to an unofficial count, 23 athletes from 17 countries participated in the event.

- Belarus (1)
- Belgium (1)
- Bulgaria (1)
- France (3)
- Germany (1)
- Israel (1)
- Italy (1)
- Netherlands (1)
- Norway (2)
- Poland (1)
- Portugal (1)
- Russia (2)
- Slovakia (1)
- Slovenia (1)
- Sweden (1)
- Turkey (1)
- Ukraine (3)
