= 2012 European Athletics Championships – Women's 4 × 400 metres relay =

Women's 4 × 400 metres relay at the European Athletics Championships

The women's 4 × 400 metres relay at the 2012 European Athletics Championships was held at the Helsinki Olympic Stadium on 30 June and 1 July.

== Medalists ==
Gold	Yuilya Olishevska, Olha Zemlyak; Nataliya Pyhyda, Alina Lohvynenko; Ukraine
Silver	Phara Anacharsis, Lenora Guion Firmin; Marie Gayot, Floria Gueï; France
Bronze	Zuzana Hejnová, Zuzana Bergrová; Jitka Bartoničková, Denisa Rosolová; Czech Republic

== Records ==
Standing records prior to the 2012 European Athletics Championships
World record	Soviet Union; Tatyana Ledovskaya, Olga Nazarova; Mariya Pinigina, Olga Bryzgina	3:15.17	Seoul, South Korea	1 October 1988
European record	Soviet Union; Tatyana Ledovskaya, Olga Nazarova; Mariya Pinigina, Olga Bryzgina	3:15.17	Seoul, South Korea	1 October 1988
Championship record	East Germany; Kirsten Emmelmann, Sabine Busch; Petra Müller, Marita Koch	3:16.87	Stuttgart, West Germany	31 August 1986
World Leading	United States RED; Francena McCorory, Allyson Felix; Natasha Hastings, Sanya Richards-Ross	3:21.18	Philadelphia, United States	28 April 2012
European Leading	Ukraine; Antonina Yefremova, Alina Lohvynenko; Nataliya Pyhyda, Yuilya Olishevska	3:26.36	Yalta, Ukraine	29 May 2012
Broken records during the 2012 European Athletics Championships
European Leading	Ukraine; Yuilya Olishevska, Olha Zemlyak; Nataliya Pyhyda, Alina Lohvynenko	3:25.07	Helsinki, Finland	1 July 2012

== Schedule ==
Date	Time	Round
30 June 2012	21:50	Round 1
1 July 2012	19:25	Final

== Results ==
=== Round 1 ===
First 3 in each heat (Q) and 2 best performers (q) advance to the Final.

Rank	Heat	Lane	Nation	Athletes	Time	Notes
1	2	3	France	Phara Anacharsis, Elea-Mariama Diarra, Lenora Guion Firmin, Floria Gueï	3:29.03	Q
2	1	4	Ukraine	Yuilya Olishevska, Darya Prystupa, Nataliya Pyhyda, Alina Lohvynenko	3:29.09	Q
3	2	6	Great Britain	Eilidh Child, Kelly Massey, Nicola Sanders, Shana Cox	3:29.96	Q
4	2	7	Czech Republic	Jitka Bartoničková, Denisa Rosolová, Zuzana Bergrová, Zuzana Hejnová	3:30.86	Q
5	2	5	Russia	Olga Tovarnova, Tatyana Veshkurova, Liliya Molgacheva, Yuliya Terekhova	3:31.35	q
6	1	3	Germany	Esther Cremer, Janin Lindenberg, Christiane Klopsch, Fabienne Kohlmann	3:31.38	Q
7	1	1	Romania	Elena Mirela Lavric, Alina Panainte, Bianca Răzor, Angela Moroșanu	3:31.48	Q
8	2	1	Poland	Agata Bednarek, Justyna Święty, Iga Baumgart, Anna Jesień	3:31.50	q
8	1	2	Belarus	Maryna Boika, Iryna Khliustava, Yulia Yurenya, Ilona Usovich	3:31.50	
10	2	2	Italy	Chiara Bazzoni, Maria Enrica Spacca, Libania Grenot, Marta Milani	3:31.64	
DQ	1	8	Turkey	Sema Apak, Merve Aydın, Meliz Redif, Pınar Saka	~~3:34.70~~	Doping
11	1	6	Norway	Irene Høvik Helgesen, Nina Katrine Brandt, Line Kloster, Martine Eikemo Borge	3:37.74	
12	1	7	Spain	Aauri Bokesa, Natalia Romero, Begoña Garrido, Andrea Díez	3:38.00	
13	2	8	Portugal	Carla Tavares, Carolina Duarte, Vera Barbosa, Joceline Monteiro	3:40.79	
14	2	4	Finland	Jenni Kivioja, Ella Räsänen, Ilona Punkkinen, Emma Millard	3:40.97	
	1	5	Ireland	Claire Bergin, Joanne Cuddihy, Marian Heffernan, Michelle Carey	DQ	

=== Final ===
Rank	Lane	Nation	Athletes	Time	Notes
1st place, gold medalist(s)	6	Ukraine	Yuilya Olishevska, Olha Zemlyak, Nataliya Pyhyda, Alina Lohvynenko	3:25.07	EL
2nd place, silver medalist(s)	3	France	Phara Anacharsis, Lenora Guion Firmin, Marie Gayot, Floria Gueï	3:25.49	
3rd place, bronze medalist(s)	8	Czech Republic	Zuzana Hejnová, Zuzana Bergrová, Jitka Bartoničková, Denisa Rosolová	3:26.02	
4	5	Great Britain	Shana Cox, Nicola Sanders, Lee McConnell, Eilidh Child	3:26.20	
5	4	Germany	Esther Cremer, Janin Lindenberg, Christiane Klopsch, Fabienne Kohlmann	3:27.81	
6	2	Russia	Olga Tovarnova, Tatyana Veshkurova, Yuliya Terekhova, Ksenia Zadorina	3:28.36	
7	7	Romania	Sanda Belgyan, Elena Mirela Lavric, Bianca Răzor, Angela Moroșanu	3:29.80	
8	1	Poland	Agata Bednarek, Justyna Święty, Magdalena Gorzkowska, Anna Jesień	3:30.17	
