= Agnès Raharolahy =

French sprinter (born 1992)

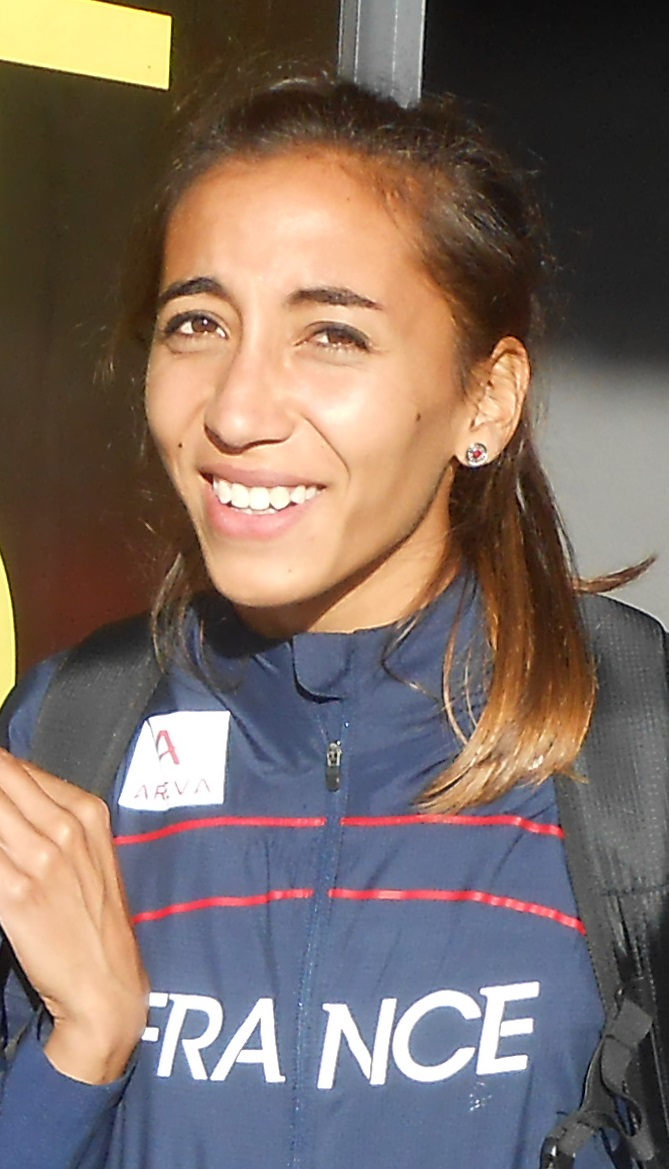
- Raharolahy in 2014

Personal information
- Born: 7 November 1992 (age 33) Alençon, France
- Height: 168 cm (5 ft 6 in)
- Weight: 59 kg (130 lb)

Sport
- Country: France
- Sport: Athletics
- Events: 400 metres, 800 metres
- Club: Nantes Métropole Athlétisme
- Coached by: Emmanuel Huruguen
Medal record
Women's athletics
Representing France
European Championships
Gold medal – first place	2014 Zürich	4 × 400 m relay
Silver medal – second place	2016 Amsterdam	4 × 400 m relay
Silver medal – second place	2018 Berlin	4 × 400 m relay
European Indoor Championships
Gold medal – first place	2015 Prague	4 × 400 m relay
Bronze medal – third place	2023 Istanbul	800 m
European U23 Championships
Bronze medal – third place	2013 Tampere	4 × 400 m relay

Agnès Raharolahy (born 7 November 1992) is a French athlete specialising in the 400 metres and 800 metres. She won the bronze medal in the 800 m at the 2023 European Indoor Championships. Raharolahy earned five major medals in the 4 × 400 m relays.

She won two French indoor titles (400 m, 800 m).

Raharolahy is of Malagasy descent.

== Statistics ==
=== Competition record ===
Representing France
Year	Competition	Venue	Position	Event	Time
2011	European Junior Championships	Tallinn, Estonia	8th (h)	400 m	54.13
2011	European Junior Championships	Tallinn, Estonia	5th	4 × 400 m relay	3:37.57
2013	Mediterranean Games	Mersin, Turkey	3rd	400 m	52.90
2013	European U23 Championships	Tampere, Finland	12th (h)	400 m	53.67
2013	European U23 Championships	Tampere, Finland	3rd	4 × 400 m relay	3:30.64
2014	World Relays	Nassau, Bahamas	4th	4 × 400 m relay	3:25.84
2014	European Championships	Zürich, Switzerland	1st	4 × 400 m relay	3:24.27
2015	European Indoor Championships	Prague, Czech Republic	1st	4 × 400 m relay	3:31.61
2015	World Championships	Beijing, China	7th	4 × 400 m relay	3:26.45
2016	European Championships	Amsterdam, Netherlands	2nd	4 × 400 m relay	3:28.38^{1}
2017	European Indoor Championships	Belgrade, Serbia	5th	4 × 400 m relay	3:33.61
2017	World Relays	Nassau, Bahamas	8th	4 × 400 m relay	3:35.03
2017	World Championships	London, United Kingdom	4th	4 × 400 m relay	3:26.56
2018	Mediterranean Games	Tarragona, Spain	2nd	4 × 400 m relay	3:29.76
2018	European Championships	Berlin, Germany	2nd	4 × 400 m relay	3:27.17
2019	European Indoor Championships	Glasgow, United Kingdom	13th (sf)	400 m	53.43
2019	European Indoor Championships	Glasgow, United Kingdom	4th	4 × 400 m relay	3:32.12
2019	World Relays	Yokohama, Japan	8th (h)	4 × 400 m relay	3:29.89
2019	World Championships	Doha, Qatar	12th (h)	4 × 400 m relay	3:29.66
2022	European Championships	Munich, Germany	29th (h)	800 m	2:07.02
2023	European Indoor Championships	Istanbul, Turkey	3rd	800 m	2:00.85
2023	World Championships	Budapest, Hungary	47th (h)	800 m	2:01.93

^{1}Time from the heats; Raharolahy was replaced in the final.

=== Personal bests ===
- 400 metres – 52.23 (Geneva 2015)
  - 400 metres indoor – 52.57 (Miramas 2019)
- 800 metres – 1:59.59 (Caen 2022)
  - 800 metres indoor – 2:00.83 (Val-de-Reuil 2023)

=== National titles ===
- French Indoor Athletics Championships
  - 400 metres: 2017
  - 800 metres: 2022
