= 2015 European Athletics Indoor Championships – Women's 400 metres =

Women's 400 metres at the 2015 European Athletics Indoor Championships
- Venue: O2 Arena
- Location: Prague, Czech Republic
- Dates: 6 March 2015 (heats and semi-finals); 7 March 2015 (final)
- Competitors: 28 from 18 nations
- Winning time: 51.96 s

Medalists
gold medal	Nataliya Pyhyda	Ukraine
silver medal	Indira Terrero	Spain
bronze medal	Seren Bundy-Davies	Great Britain

The women's 400 metres event at the 2015 European Athletics Indoor Championships was held on 6 March at 11:00 (heats), 17:10 (semifinals) and on 7 March at 19:10 (final) local time.

== Results ==
=== Heats ===
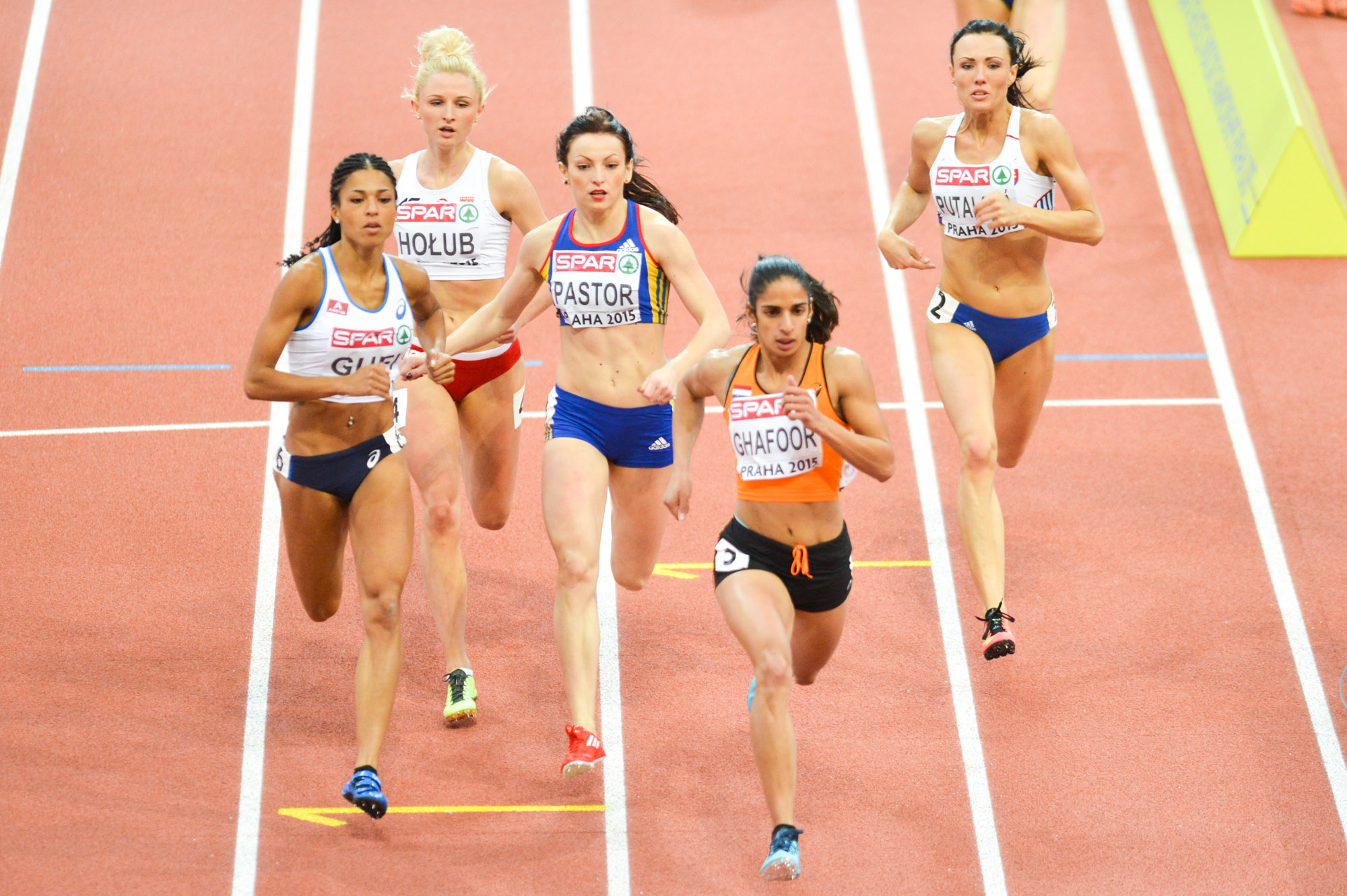
Runners of the first heat in round 1

Qualification: First 2 of each heat (Q) and the next 2 fastest (q) qualified for the semifinals.

Rank	Heat	Athlete	Nationality	Time	Note
1	2	Marie Gayot	France	53.04	Q
2	1	Madiea Ghafoor	Netherlands	53.06	Q
3	4	Seren Bundy-Davies	Great Britain	53.07	Q
4	1	Floria Gueï	France	53.10	Q
5	2	Denisa Rosolová	Czech Republic	53.17	Q
6	4	Indira Terrero	Spain	53.19	Q
7	5	Nataliya Pyhyda	Ukraine	53.20	Q
8	5	Kirsten McAslan	Great Britain	53.27	Q
9	1	Iveta Putalová	Slovakia	53.28	q, NR
10	4	Sara Petersen	Denmark	53.29	q
11	1	Małgorzata Hołub	Poland	53.31	
12	1	Adelina Pastor	Romania	53.37	
13	3	Laura Maddox	Great Britain	53.67	Q
14	3	Justyna Święty	Poland	53.74	Q
15	3	Bianca Răzor	Romania	53.76	
16	2	Aauri Lorena Bokesa	Spain	53.80	
17	4	Elise Malmberg	Sweden	53.81	PB
18	5	Ruth Sophia Spelmeyer	Germany	53.84	
19	5	Chiara Bazzoni	Italy	53.85	
20	2	Léa Sprunger	Switzerland	53.97	
21	4	Maria Benedicta Chigbolu	Italy	54.17	
22	3	Line Kloster	Norway	54.21	
23	1	Amaliya Sharoyan	Armenia	54.24	NR
24	2	Ylenia Vitale	Italy	54.31	
25	3	Tamara Salaški	Serbia	54.39	
26	3	Alexandra Štuková	Slovakia	55.11	
27	5	Helena Jiranová	Czech Republic	55.33	
28	5	Hristina Risteska	Macedonia	57.95	

=== Semifinals ===
Qualification: First 3 of each semifinal (Q) qualified directly for the final.

Rank	Heat	Athlete	Nationality	Time	Note
1	1	Nataliya Pyhyda	Ukraine	52.44	Q, SB
2	2	Denisa Rosolová	Czech Republic	52.48	Q, SB
3	1	Marie Gayot	France	52.53	Q
4	2	Iveta Putalová	Slovakia	52.99	Q, NR
5	2	Seren Bundy-Davies	Great Britain	53.00	Q
6	2	Floria Gueï	France	53.00	
7	1	Indira Terrero	Spain	53.16	Q
8	1	Kirsten McAslan	Great Britain	53.49	
9	2	Justyna Święty	Poland	53.53	
10	2	Madiea Ghafoor	Netherlands	53.64	
11	1	Sara Petersen	Denmark	53.82	
12	1	Laura Maddox	Great Britain	53.89	

=== Final ===
Rank	Lane	Athlete	Nationality	Time	Note
1st place, gold medalist(s)	6	Nataliya Pyhyda	Ukraine	51.96	SB
2nd place, silver medalist(s)	1	Indira Terrero	Spain	52.63	SB
3rd place, bronze medalist(s)	2	Seren Bundy-Davies	Great Britain	52.64	
4	3	Iveta Putalová	Slovakia	52.84	NR
5	4	Marie Gayot	France	53.11	
6	5	Denisa Rosolová	Czech Republic	53.20	
