= Athletics at the 2017 Summer Universiade – Women's 400 metres =

The women's 400 metres event at the 2017 Summer Universiade was held on 23, 24 and 25 August at the Taipei Municipal Stadium.

== Medalists ==
Gold	Silver	Bronze
Małgorzata Hołub; Poland	Justine Palframan; South Africa	Bianca Răzor; Romania

== Results ==
=== Heats ===
Qualification: First 4 in each heat (Q) and next 4 fastest (q) qualified for the semifinals.

Rank	Heat	Name	Nationality	Time	Notes
1	1	Cátia Azevedo	Portugal	52.27	Q
2	5	Paola Morán	Mexico	52.43	Q, PB
3	5	Aiyanna Stiverne	Canada	53.06	Q
4	1	Leni Shida	Uganda	53.48	Q
5	5	Bianca Răzor	Romania	53.52	Q
6	1	Natali Brito	Mexico	53.58	Q
7	1	Eva Misiūnaitė	Lithuania	53.64	Q
8	1	Dawnalee Loney	Jamaica	53.87	q
9	3	Kateryna Klymiuk	Ukraine	54.15	Q
10	1	Anastasiia Bryzgina	Ukraine	54.16	q
11	4	Iga Baumgart	Poland	54.35	Q
12	4	Elina Mikhina	Kazakhstan	54.43	Q
13	5	Kelli Hardnett	United States	54.47	Q, SB
14	2	Małgorzata Hołub	Poland	54.49	Q
15	4	Micha Powell	Canada	54.55	Q
16	3	Camelia Florina Gal	Romania	54.58	Q
17	5	Vanessa Zimmermann	Switzerland	54.77	q
18	3	Kristina Dudek	Croatia	54.97	Q
19	2	Justine Palframan	South Africa	55.04	Q
20	2	Eliana Chávez	Colombia	55.18	Q
21	2	Noelia Martínez	Argentina	55.34	Q
22	1	Hajuaha Braimah	Ghana	55.82	q
23	1	Helin Meier	Estonia	56.10	
24	3	Birexus Hawkins	United States	57.14	Q
25	5	Tamara Zupanič	Slovenia	57.96	
26	4	Twinkle Chaudhary	India	58.90	Q
27	3	Rathnayaka Mudiyanselage	Sri Lanka	1:00.94	
28	5	Amantle Monwa	Botswana	1:02.05	
29	4	Jingky Obanon	Philippines	1:04.43	
30	2	Musonda Chitoshi	Zambia	1:05.96	
31	3	Alfin Nyamasyo	Kenya	1:07.08	
32	5	Muzna Al-Malki	Oman	1:16.03	
	2	Margaret Barrie	Sierra Leone	DNS	

=== Semifinals ===
Qualification: First 2 in each heat (Q) and the next 2 fastest (q) qualified for the final.

Rank	Heat	Name	Nationality	Time	Notes
1	3	Małgorzata Hołub	Poland	51.88	Q
2	3	Bianca Răzor	Romania	51.99	Q
3	1	Aiyanna Stiverne	Canada	52.03	Q
4	1	Justine Palframan	South Africa	52.12	Q, SB
5	1	Iga Baumgart	Poland	52.25	q
6	3	Paola Morán	Mexico	52.38	q, PB
7	2	Cátia Azevedo	Portugal	52.52	Q
8	2	Kateryna Klymiuk	Ukraine	52.90	Q
9	3	Elina Mikhina	Kazakhstan	53.04	SB
10	1	Anastasiia Bryzgina	Ukraine	53.28	
11	2	Leni Shida	Uganda	53.44	
12	1	Camelia Florina Gal	Romania	53.48	
13	1	Eva Misiūnaitė	Lithuania	53.84	
14	3	Vanessa Zimmermann	Switzerland	54.83	
15	3	Kristina Dudek	Croatia	54.97	
16	1	Dawnalee Loney	Jamaica	54.99	
17	2	Micha Powell	Canada	55.22	
18	2	Hajuaha Braimah	Ghana	55.52	
19	2	Noelia Martínez	Argentina	55.66	
20	1	Eliana Chávez	Colombia	57.05	
21	2	Birexus Hawkins	United States	57.63	
22	3	Twinkle Chaudhary	India	58.24	
	2	Natali Brito	Mexico	DQ	R163.3a
	3	Kelli Hardnett	United States	DNS	

=== Final ===
Official Video

Rank	Lane	Name	Nationality	Time	Notes
1st place, gold medalist(s)	5	Małgorzata Hołub	Poland	51.76	
2nd place, silver medalist(s)	7	Justine Palframan	South Africa	51.83	SB
3rd place, bronze medalist(s)	3	Bianca Răzor	Romania	51.97	
4	6	Aiyanna Stiverne	Canada	52.33	
5	4	Cátia Azevedo	Portugal	52.39	
6	2	Iga Baumgart	Poland	52.46	
7	1	Paola Morán	Mexico	52.96	
8	8	Kateryna Klymiuk	Ukraine	53.85	
