= Risteska =

Risteska is a surname. Notable people with the surname include:

- Elena Risteska (born 1986), Macedonian singer
- Hristina Risteska (born 1991), Macedonian sprinter
