= Adelina Pastor =

Romanian sprinter (born 1993)

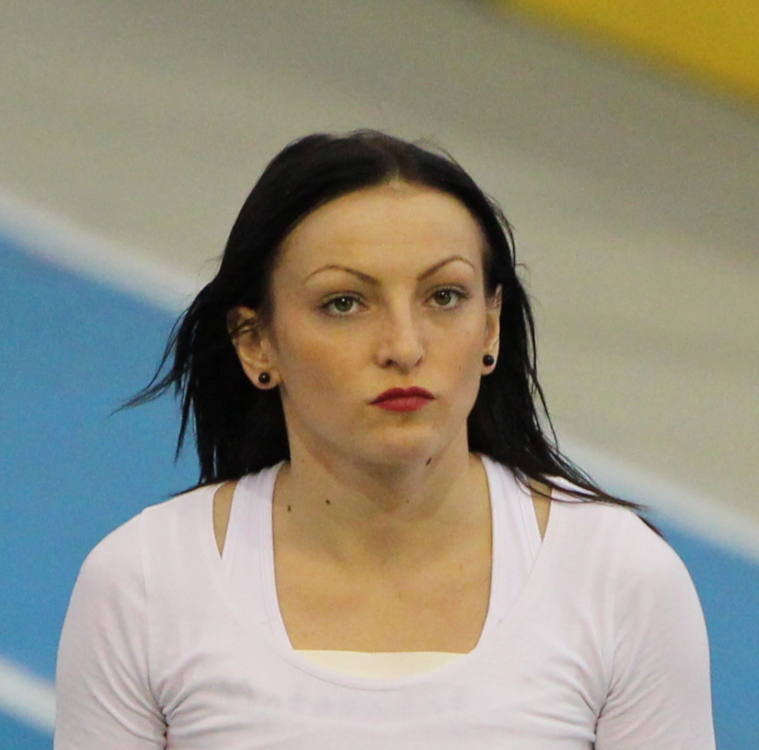
- Pastor in 2015

Personal information
- Full name: Adelina Dorina Pastor
- Born: 5 May 1993 (age 33)
- Height: 1.68 m (5 ft 6 in)
- Weight: 53 kg (117 lb)

Sport
- Sport: Track and field
- Event: 400 metres
- Club: CAM Timișoara
Medal record
World Indoor Championships
Bronze medal – third place	2012 Istanbul	4x400 m relay
Bronze medal – third place	2016 Portland	4×400 m relay

Adelina Dorina Pastor (born 5 May 1993) is a Romanian sprinter specialising in the 400 metres. She competed in the 4 × 400 metres relay at the 2016 IAAF World Indoor Championships winning a bronze medal. She also represented her country at the 2013 World Championships and two previous editions of the World Indoor Championships. Her personal bests in the 400 metres are 52.44 seconds outdoors (Tampere 2013) and 53.22 seconds indoors (Istanbul 2015).

== Competition record ==
Year	Competition	Venue	Position	Event	Notes
Representing Romania
2009	World Youth Championships	Brixen, Italy	5th	400 m	55.59
2009	World Youth Championships	Brixen, Italy	3rd	Medley relay	2:09.25
2009	European Youth Olympic Festival	Tampere, Finland	3rd	400 m	54.72
2010	World Junior Championships	Moncton, Canada	16th (sf)	400 m	54.47
2010	World Junior Championships	Moncton, Canada	–	4 × 400 m relay	DQ
2011	European Junior Championships	Tallinn, Estonia	1st (h)	400 m	52.77^{1}
2012	World Indoor Championships	Istanbul, Turkey	3rd	4 × 400 m relay	3:33.41
2012	European Championships	Helsinki, Finland	23rd (h)	400 m	54.35
2012	World Junior Championships	Barcelona, Spain	12th (sf)	400 m	53.28
2012	World Junior Championships	Barcelona, Spain	–	4 × 400 m relay	DQ
2013	European U23 Championships	Tampere, Finland	5th	400 m	52.44
2013	European U23 Championships	Tampere, Finland	2nd	4 × 400 m relay	3:30.28
2013	World Championships	Moscow, Russia	7th	4 × 400 m relay	3:28.40
2013	Jeux de la Francophonie	Nice, France	6th	400 m	54.80
2013	Jeux de la Francophonie	Nice, France	1st	4 × 400 m relay	3:29.81
2014	World Indoor Championships	Sopot, Poland	8th (h)	4 × 400 m relay	3:38.18
2014	European Championships	Zürich, Switzerland	20th (h)	400 m	53.30
2014	European Championships	Zürich, Switzerland	9th (h)	4 × 400 m relay	3:33.84
2015	European Indoor Championships	Prague, Czech Republic	12th (h)	400 m	53.37
2016	World Indoor Championships	Portland, United States	3rd	4 × 400 m relay	3:31.51
2016	European Championships	Amsterdam, Netherlands	17th (sf)	400 m	52.90
2016	European Championships	Amsterdam, Netherlands	8th	4 × 400 m relay	3:30.63
2016	Olympic Games	Rio de Janeiro, Brazil	14th (h)	4 × 400 m relay	3:29.87

^{1}Disqualified in the final
