= 2016 IAAF World Indoor Championships – Women's 4 × 400 metres relay =

Women's 4 × 400 metres relay at the 2016 IAAF World Indoor Championships
- Venue: Oregon Convention Center
- Dates: March 20
- Competitors: 24 from 6 nations
- Teams: 6
- Winning time: 3:26.38

Medalists
gold medal	Natasha Hastings; Quanera Hayes; Courtney Okolo; Ashley Spencer	United States
silver medal	Ewelina Ptak; Małgorzata Hołub; Magdalena Gorzkowska; Justyna Święty	Poland
bronze medal	Adelina Pastor; Elena Mirela Lavric; Andrea Miklós; Bianca Răzor	Romania

Video on YouTube Official Video

The women's 4 × 400 metres relay at the 2016 IAAF World Indoor Championships took place on March 20, 2016.

The favorites and home team, USA, pulled no punches, strategically placing their fastest starter, Natasha Hastings on the lead leg. As planned, she took the lead at the break, holding off a feisty Romanian, Adelina Pastor around the third turn. Long striding Jamaican lead runner Patricia Hall found herself walled off. Down the backstretch she tangled legs, possibly with Poland's Ewelina Ptak and Nigeria's Margaret Bamgbose behind her. Suddenly Hall was down on her face, hard. The race was running away from her. With their closest competitors out of the race, the USA had no one near them and no traffic. They extended their lead with each leg, setting a new national record with an easy victory. Behind them was a close battle for the other medals, Romania holding the early lead with Nigeria's Regina George and Poland's Małgorzata Hołub edging ahead of Elena Mirela Lavric at the end of the second leg. Magdalena Gorzkowska took the lead for Poland at the second handoff and they never relinquished it. On the final lap Bianca Răzor ran down Ada Benjamin to take the bronze for Romania. The Polish and Romanian teams were elated with their unexpected medals.

== Results ==
The race was started at 14:20.

Rank	Nation	Athletes	Time	Notes
1st place, gold medalist(s)	United States	Natasha Hastings, Quanera Hayes, Courtney Okolo, Ashley Spencer	3:26.38	WL
2nd place, silver medalist(s)	Poland	Ewelina Ptak, Małgorzata Hołub, Magdalena Gorzkowska, Justyna Święty	3:31.15	SB
3rd place, bronze medalist(s)	Romania	Adelina Pastor, Elena Mirela Lavric, Andrea Miklós, Bianca Răzor	3:31.51	SB
4	Nigeria	Margaret Bamgbose, Regina George, Tameka Jameson, Ada Benjamin	3:34.03	SB
5	Ukraine	Anastasiia Lebid, Olha Bibik, Anastasiia Bryzgina, Dzhois Koba	3:40.42	SB
	Jamaica	Patricia Hall, Chrisann Gordon, Anneisha McLaughlin-Whilby, Stephenie Ann McPherson	DNF	
