= 2012 World Junior Championships in Athletics – Women's 400 metres =

The women's 400 metres at the 2012 World Junior Championships in Athletics was held at the Estadi Olímpic Lluís Companys on 11, 12, and 13 July.

== Medalists ==
Gold	Ashley Spencer; United States
Silver	Kadecia Baird; Guyana
Bronze	Erika Rucker; United States

== Records ==
Prior to the competition, the existing world junior and championship records were as follows.

World Junior Record	Grit Breuer (GER)	49.42	Tokyo, Japan	27 August 1991
Championship Record	Fatima Yusuf (NGR)	50.62	Plovdiv, Bulgaria	10 August 1990
World Junior Leading	Ashley Spencer (USA)	51.02	Madison, United States	13 May 2012
Broken records during the 2012 World Junior Championships in Athletics
Championship Record; World Junior Leading	Ashley Spencer (USA)	50.50	Barcelona, Spain	13 July 2012

== Results ==
=== Heats ===
Qualification: first 3 of each heat (Q) plus the 6 fastest times (q) qualified

Rank	Heat	Lane	Name	Nationality	Time	Note
1	1	4	Ashley Spencer	United States	52.58	Q
2	4	9	Shaunae Miller	Bahamas	52.71	Q
3	4	6	Patrycja Wyciszkiewicz	Poland	52.76	Q, NJ
4	4	7	Olivia James	Jamaica	52.86	Q, SB
5	1	3	Ekaterina Renzhina	Russia	52.92	Q, PB
6	5	4	Chrisann Gordon	Jamaica	52.99	Q
7	5	6	Kadecia Baird	Guyana	53.29	Q
8	6	7	Erika Rucker	United States	53.32	Q
9	3	6	Bianca Răzor	Romania	53.44	Q
10	6	8	Justine Palframan	South Africa	53.53	Q
11	1	9	Maike Schachtschneider	Germany	53.57	Q, PB
12	4	3	Ella Räsänen	Finland	53.77	q, SB
13	6	5	Adelina Pastor	Romania	53.85	Q
14	2	6	Rashan Brown	Bahamas	54.02	Q
15	4	4	Flavia Battaglia	Italy	54.03	q, PB
16	5	8	Abbey de la Motte	Australia	54.03	Q, PB
17	1	7	Joanna Mills	Ireland	54.17	q, SB
18	3	9	Morgan Mitchell	Australia	54.19	Q, PB
19	3	8	Bianka Kéri	Hungary	54.34	Q
20	2	5	Alina Galitskaya	Russia	54.55	Q
21	1	5	Grace Claxton	Puerto Rico	54.65	q, NJ
22	5	7	Viktoriya Tkachuk	Ukraine	54.67	q
23	1	6	Simone Werner	Switzerland	54.70	q, PB
24	5	9	Carina Schrempf	Austria	54.73	PB
25	4	8	Rivinilda Mentai	Portugal	54.83	NJ
26	6	4	Kateryna Slyusarenko	Ukraine	54.88	
27	3	3	Janet Seeliger	South Africa	55.00	
28	2	9	Jie Chen	China	55.04	Q
29	6	6	Ines Futterknecht	Austria	55.16	
30	3	5	Christine Botlogetswe	Botswana	55.26	PB
31	4	5	Qingqing Wu	China	55.37	
32	2	7	Gunta Latiševa-Cudare	Latvia	55.57	
33	2	8	Olga Andreyeva	Kazakhstan	55.96	
34	3	4	Danielle Alakija	Fiji	56.69	
35	6	3	Jonel Lacey	British Virgin Islands	58.87	PB
36	2	2	Princilla Tshabu Amisi	Democratic Republic of the Congo	1:05.85	PB
37	2	4	Reloliza Saimon	Federated States of Micronesia	1:09.88	SB
–	5	5	Lucy Fortune	Grenada	–	DSQ
–	5	3	Regina Tavera	Mexico	–	DSQ
–	6	9	Alexandra Courtnall	Canada	–	DSQ
–	2	3	Florence Uwakwe	Nigeria	–	DNS
–	1	8	Melisa Torres	Colombia	–	DNS
–	3	7	Omolara Omotosho	Nigeria	–	DNS

=== Semi-finals ===
Qualification: first 2 of each heat (Q) plus the 2 fastest times (q) qualified

Rank	Heat	Lane	Name	Nationality	Time	Note
1	1	6	Erika Rucker	United States	52.05	Q, PB
2	3	5	Ashley Spencer	United States	52.24	Q
3	1	4	Kadecia Baird	Guyana	52.40	Q
4	1	7	Justine Palframan	South Africa	52.65	q
5	1	5	Chrisann Gordon	Jamaica	52.70	q
6	3	9	Olivia James	Jamaica	52.71	Q, SB
7	2	4	Shaunae Miller	Bahamas	52.75	Q
8	2	6	Bianca Răzor	Romania	52.87	Q
9	3	4	Rashan Brown	Bahamas	52.88	
10	2	7	Ekaterina Renzhina	Russia	52.97	
11	3	7	Patrycja Wyciszkiewicz	Poland	53.04	
12	1	9	Adelina Pastor	Romania	53.28	SB
13	2	5	Morgan Mitchell	Australia	53.88	PB
14	1	8	Abbey de la Motte	Australia	53.90	PB
15	3	2	Ella Räsänen	Finland	54.40	
16	1	2	Grace Claxton	Puerto Rico	54.42	NJ
17	2	9	Maike Schachtschneider	Germany	54.49	
18	1	3	Joanna Mills	Ireland	54.52	
19	3	8	Jie Chen	China	54.67	
20	2	8	Bianka Kéri	Hungary	54.68	
21	2	2	Flavia Battaglia	Italy	54.82	
22	3	6	Alina Galitskaya	Russia	54.98	
23	2	3	Viktoriya Tkachuk	Ukraine	55.02	
24	3	3	Simone Werner	Switzerland	55.85	

=== Final ===
Rank	Lane	Name	Nationality	Time	Note
1st place, gold medalist(s)	6	Ashley Spencer	United States	50.50	CR
2nd place, silver medalist(s)	4	Kadecia Baird	Guyana	51.04	AJ
3rd place, bronze medalist(s)	5	Erika Rucker	United States	51.10	PB
4	7	Shaunae Miller	Bahamas	51.78	
5	3	Justine Palframan	South Africa	51.87	NJ
6	8	Bianca Răzor	Romania	52.20	SB
7	2	Chrisann Gordon	Jamaica	52.31	SB
8	9	Olivia James	Jamaica	52.68	SB

== Participation ==
According to an unofficial count, 40 athletes from 30 countries participated in the event.

- Australia (2)
- Austria (2)
- Bahamas (2)
- Botswana (1)
- British Virgin Islands (1)
- Canada (1)
- China (2)
- Colombia (1)
- DR Congo (1)
- Fiji (1)
- Finland (1)
- Germany (1)
- Grenada (1)
- Guyana (1)
- Hungary (1)
- Ireland (1)
- Italy (1)
- Jamaica (2)
- Kazakhstan (1)
- Latvia (1)
- Mexico (1)
- Federated States of Micronesia (1)
- Poland (1)
- Portugal (1)
- Puerto Rico (1)
- Romania (2)
- Russia (2)
- South Africa (2)
- Switzerland (1)
- Ukraine (2)
- United States (2)
