= Mirela Lavric =

Romanian middle-distance runner

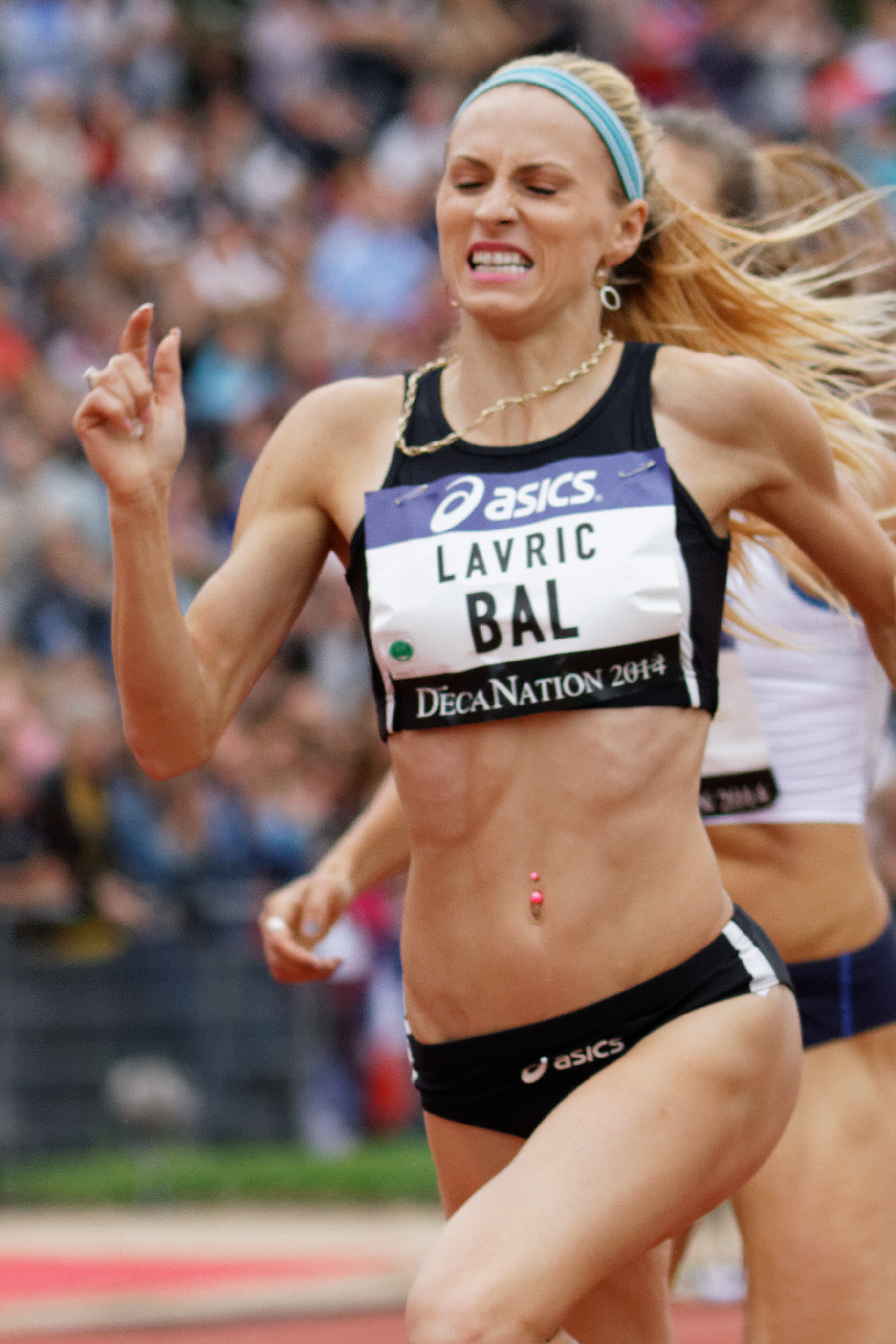

Medal record

Women's athletics

Representing Romania

World Indoor Championships
Bronze medal – third place	2012 Istanbul	4×400 m relay
Bronze medal – third place	2016 Portland	4×400 m relay

Elena Mirela Lavric (born 17 February 1991, in Pungești) is a Romanian athlete who specializes in the 800 metres. Her personal best time is 1:59.74 in Hengelo. She competed for Romania at the 2012 Summer Olympics.

== Competition record ==
Year	Competition	Venue	Position	Event	Notes
Representing Romania
2007	World Youth Championships	Ostrava, Czech Republic	1st	800 m	2:04.29
2007	European Junior Championships	Hengelo, Netherlands	1st	800 m	2:02.84 (PB)
2007	World Championships	Osaka, Japan	14th (h)	4 × 400 m relay	3:35.69
2008	World Indoor Championships	Valencia, Spain	5th	4 × 400 m relay	3:36.79
2008	World Junior Championships	Bydgoszcz, Poland	1st	800 m	2:00.06 (CR)
2008	World Junior Championships	Bydgoszcz, Poland	11th (h)	4 × 400 m relay	3:41.39
2009	European Indoor Championships	Turin, Italy	10th (sf)	800 m	2:06.93
2009	European Junior Championships	Novi Sad, Serbia	1st	800 m	2:04.12
2009	World Championships	Berlin, Germany	26th (h)	800 m	2:04.49
2010	World Junior Championships	Moncton, New Brunswick, Canada	1st	800 m	2:01.85
2010	World Junior Championships	Moncton, New Brunswick, Canada	—	4 × 400 m relay	DQ
2010	European Championships	Barcelona, Spain	8th	4 × 400 m relay	3:29.75
2011	European Indoor Championships	Paris, France	–	800 m	DNF
2011	European U23 Championships	Ostrava, Czech Republic	7th	800 m	2:12.99
2011	European U23 Championships	Ostrava, Czech Republic	5th	4 × 400 m relay	3:36.76
2012	World Indoor Championships	Istanbul, Turkey	3rd	4 × 400 m relay	3:33.41
2012	European Championships	Helsinki, Finland	18th	800 m	2:11.6
2012	European Championships	Helsinki, Finland	7th	4 × 400 m relay	3:29.80
2012	Olympic Games	London, United Kingdom	14th (sf)	800 m	2:00.46
2013	European U23 Championships	Tampere, Finland	2nd	400 m	52.06
2013	European U23 Championships	Tampere, Finland	1st	800 m	2:01.56
2013	European U23 Championships	Tampere, Finland	2nd	4 × 400 m relay	3:30.28
2013	World Championships	Moscow, Russia	31st (h)	800 m	2:10.37
2013	Jeux de la Francophonie	Nice, France	1st	800 m	2:02.27
2013	Jeux de la Francophonie	Nice, France	1st	4 × 400 m relay	3:29.81
2014	European Championships	Zürich, Switzerland	8th	800 m	2:09.25
2016	World Indoor Championships	Portland, United States	3rd	4 × 400 m relay	3:31.51
