= Athletics at the 2015 Summer Universiade – Women's 4 × 400 metres relay =

The women's 4 x 400 metres relay event at the 2015 Summer Universiade was held on 12 July at the Gwangju Universiade Main Stadium.

== Results ==
Rank	Nation	Athletes	Time	Notes
1st place, gold medalist(s)	Poland	Małgorzata Hołub, Monika Szczęsna, Joanna Linkiewicz, Justyna Święty	3:31.98	
2nd place, silver medalist(s)	Russia	Liliya Gafiyatullina, Kristina Malvinova, Irina Takuncheva, Yelena Zuykevich	3:32.46	
3rd place, bronze medalist(s)	United States	Akeyla Mitchell, Madeline Kopp, Kimberly Mackay, Alissa Martinez	3:37.20	
4	China	Zhan Qingqing, Zhang Gui, Jiang Dan, Yang Huizhen	3:43.91	
5	Uganda	Halimah Nakaayi, Docus Ajok, Susan Aneno, Leni Shida	3:45.40	
6	South Africa	Anneri Ebersohn, Arlene Gowar, Anuscha Nice, Justine Palframan	3:46.73	
7	Thailand	Pornpan Hoemhuk, Atchima Eng-Chuan, Jutamas Khonkham, Chamaiphon Thongsuk	3:48.95	
8	Estonia	Helin Meier, Annika Sakkarias, Kelly Nevolihhin, Karmen Veerme	3:51.99	
