= Elea (given name) =

Female given name

Elea or Éléa in French, is a feminine first name. It is a diminutive of Eleanor or its variants. In French, other frequent spelling variants are Ellea, Elhéa, and Eleah.

In Eastern European Orthodox and Islamic contexts may be a shorten masculine variant for the name Elijah. In Italian, Georgian and occasionally Greek, it may serve as a diminutive to the masculine Elia steming from the same root as the Hebrew Elijah or Eliyahu meaning "My God is Yahweh" or "God has answered". Elea is a socially recognised male name is some parts of Brazil.

== People named Éléa ==
- Éléa Gobbé-Mévellec, French animator and director
- Elea-Mariama Diarra, French athlete, specialist in the 400 meters.

== Fiction ==
- Éléa is the name of the heroine of the 1968 science fiction novel, La nuit des temps by René Barjavel.

== Popularity ==
In 2022, more than 14,800 girls were named Éléa in France.

== Locations ==
- Elea, a village in Greece
- Elea (Ελέα in ancient Greek), city ruins in Italy
