= Bianca Răzor =

Romanian sprinter

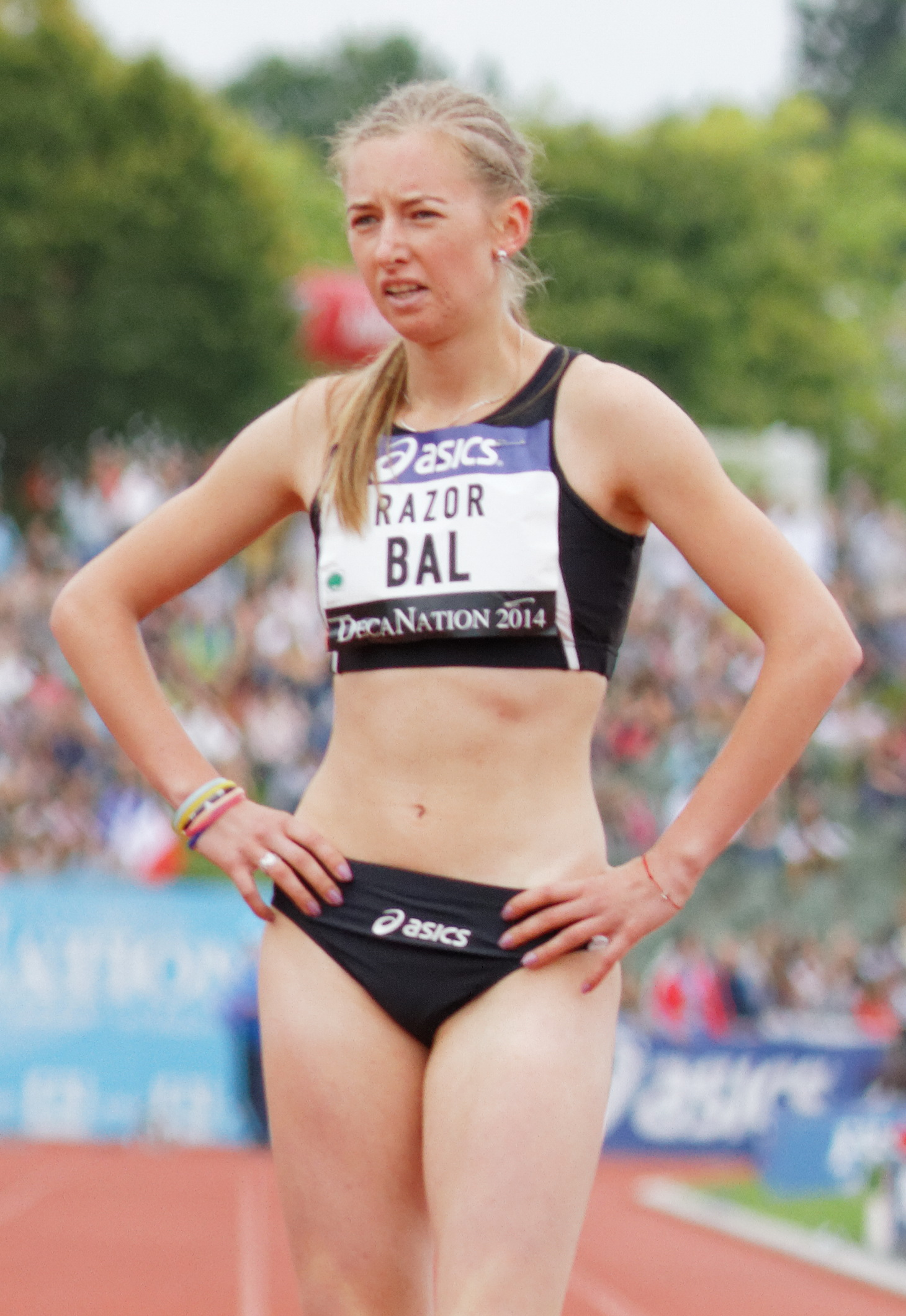
- Răzor at the 2014 DécaNation

Personal information
- Full name: Bianca Denisa Răzor
- Born: 8 August 1994 (age 31) Cluj-Napoca, Romania
- Height: 1.69 m (5 ft 7 in)
- Weight: 54 kg (119 lb)

Sport
- Country: Romania
- Sport: Athletics
- Event: 400 metres
- Club: CSA Steaua Bucharest
Medal record
World Indoor Championships
Bronze medal – third place	2016 Portland	4×400 m relay
Summer Youth Olympics
Silver medal – second place	2010 Singapore	400 m
Bronze medal – third place	2010 Singapore	Medley relay

Bianca Denisa Răzor (born 8 August 1994) is a Romanian sprinter who specializes in the 400 metres. She represented Romania at the 2012 Summer Olympics as well as two World Championships.

== Competition record ==
Year	Competition	Venue	Position	Event	Notes
Representing Romania
2010	World Junior Championships	Moncton, Canada	3rd	400 m	53.17
2010	World Junior Championships	Moncton, Canada	–	4 × 400 m relay	DQ
2010	European Championships	Barcelona, Spain	8th	4 × 400 m relay	3:29.75
2010	Youth Olympic Games	Singapore	2nd	400 m	53.10
2011	European Indoor Championships	Paris, France	16th (h)	400 m	55.08
2011	World Youth Championships	Lille, France	5th	400 m	52.82
2011	World Youth Championships	Lille, France	6th	Medley relay	2:10.17
2011	European Junior Championships	Tallinn, Estonia	1st	400 m	51.96
2011	European Junior Championships	Tallinn, Estonia	–	4 × 400 m relay	DQ
2012	European Championships	Helsinki, Finland	7th	4 × 400 m relay	3:29.80
2012	World Junior Championships	Barcelona, Spain	6th	400 m	52.20
2012	World Junior Championships	Barcelona, Spain	–	4 × 400 m relay	DQ
2012	Olympic Games	London, United Kingdom	29th (h)	400 m	52.83
2013	European Junior Championships	Rieti, Italy	2nd	400 m	51.82
2013	European Junior Championships	Rieti, Italy	6th	4 × 400 m relay	3:38.57
2013	World Championships	Moscow, Russia	13th (sf)	400 m	51.49
2013	World Championships	Moscow, Russia	7th	4 × 400 m relay	3:28.40
2013	Jeux de la Francophonie	Nice, France	3rd	400 m	52.69
2013	Jeux de la Francophonie	Nice, France	1st	4 × 400 m relay	3:29.81
2014	World Indoor Championships	Sopot, Poland	8th (h)	4 × 400 m relay	3:38.18
2014	European Championships	Zürich, Switzerland	6th	400 m	51.95
2014	European Championships	Zürich, Switzerland	9th (h)	4 × 400 m relay	3:33.84
2015	European Indoor Championships	Prague, Czech Republic	15th (h)	400 m	53.76
2015	European U23 Championships	Tallinn, Estonia	1st	400 m	51.31
2015	World Championships	Beijing, China	13th (sf)	400 m	51.05
2015	World Championships	Beijing, China	11th (h)	4 × 400 m relay	3:28.60
2015	Military World Games	Mungyeong, South Korea	2nd	400 m	51.81
2016	World Indoor Championships	Portland, United States	9th (sf)	400 m	53.34
2016	World Indoor Championships	Portland, United States	3rd	4 × 400 m relay	3:31.51
2016	Olympic Games	Rio de Janeiro, Brazil	33rd (h)	400 m	52.42
2016	Olympic Games	Rio de Janeiro, Brazil	14th (h)	4 × 400 m relay	3:29.87
2017	European Indoor Championships	Belgrade, Serbia	19th (h)	400 m	54.11
2017	World Championships	London, United Kingdom	18th (sf)	400 m	52.09
2017	Universiade	Taipei, Taiwan	3rd	400 m	51.97
2017	Universiade	Taipei, Taiwan	3rd	4 × 400 m relay	3:34.16
2017	DécaNation	Angers, France	2nd	400 m	52.98
2018	European Championships	Berlin, Germany	20th (sf)	400 m	52.27
2018	European Championships	Berlin, Germany	7th	4 × 400 m relay	3:32.15
2019	European Indoor Championships	Glasgow, United Kingdom	9th (sf)	800 m	2:03.65

== Personal bests ==
Outdoor

- 200 metres – 23.35 (+0.9 m/s, Pitesti 2015)
- 400 metres – 50.37 (Beijing 2015)

Indoor

- 400 metres – 52.82 (Istanbul 2016)
- 800 metres – 2:03.65 (Glasgow 2019)
