= Rowena Cole =

British middle-distance runner

Personal information
- Born: 13 January 1992 (age 34) Coventry, West Midlands
- Education: Tile Hill Wood School; Coventry University

Sport
- Country: Great Britain
- Sport: Track and field
- Event(s): 400 metres 800 metres
- Club: Coventry Godiva Harriers
Medal record
Track and field
Representing Great Britain
European Junior Championships
Silver medal – second place	2011 Tallinn	Women's 800m
World Junior Championships
Bronze medal – third place	2009 Bressanone	Girls' 800m

Rowena Cole (born 13 January 1992) is a British retired middle-distance runner who specialised in the 800 metres and competed in international level events. Her highest achievement in winning was a silver medal won at the 2011 European Athletics Junior Championships in Tallinn.

== Career ==
Cole trained with the Coventry Godiva Harriers athletic club.

In 2008 she was named the England Athletics’ Young Athlete of the Year and won the Intermediate 800m title at the English Schools Athletics Championships. She was then invited to become a member of the "On Camp with Kelly" mentoring and education initiative with Dame Kelly Holmes.

In 2010 she participated in the Commonwealth Games in Delhi and the next year she won a silver medal at the 2011 European Athletics Junior Championships in Tallinn. She achieved a new personal best of 2:04.21 in 2015.

In 2022 Cole ran in the Coventry Godiva Harriers Ladies' team at the Midlands Road Relay, winning the event.

Alongside competing, she achieved a Sports Marketing degree at Coventry University and was employed at the marketing department of Coventry Sports Foundation.
