= 2017 European Athletics Indoor Championships – Women's 4 × 400 metres relay =

The women's 4 × 400 metres relay event at the 2017 European Athletics Indoor Championships was held on 5 March at 19:00 local time as a straight final.

== Records ==
Standing records prior to the 2017 European Athletics Indoor Championships
| World record | Russia (RUS) | 3:23.37 | Glasgow, United Kingdom | 28 January 2006 |
| European record | Russia (RUS) | 3:23.37 | Glasgow, United Kingdom | 28 January 2006 |
| Championship record | Great Britain (GBR) | 3:27.56 | Gothenburg, Sweden | 3 March 2013 |
| World Leading | Texas A&M University | 3:29.74 | Clemson, United States | 11 February 2017 |
| European Leading | | | | |

== Results ==
| Rank | Nationality | Athlete | Time | Notes |
|---|---|---|---|---|
| 1st place, gold medalist(s) | Poland | Patrycja Wyciszkiewicz; Małgorzata Hołub; Iga Baumgart; Justyna Święty | 3:29.94 | |
| 2nd place, silver medalist(s) | Great Britain | Eilidh Doyle; Philippa Lowe; Mary Iheke; Laviai Nielsen | 3:31.05 | |
| 3rd place, bronze medalist(s) | Ukraine | Olha Bibik; Tetyana Melnyk; Anastasiya Bryzhina; Olha Lyakhova | 3:32.10 | |
| 4 | Italy | Lucia Pasquale; Maria Enrica Spacca; Maria Benedicta Chigbolu; Ayomide Folorunso | 3:32.87 | |
| 5 | France | Déborah Sananes; Agnès Raharolahy; Louise-Anne Bertheau; Floria Gueï | 3:33.61 | |
| 6 | Germany | Ruth Sophia Spelmeyer; Nadine Gonska; Carolin Walter; Lara Hoffmann | 3:34.60 | |
