= Katharina Grompe =

German sprinter

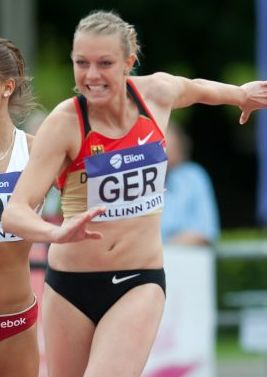
- Grompe in 2011

Personal information
- Born: 1 September 1993 (age 32) Dortmund, Germany

Sport
- Country: Germany
- Sport: Track and field
- Event(s): 60 metres 100 metres 200 metres
Medal record
Track and field
Representing Germany
World U20 Championships
| Silver medal – second place | 2012 Barcelona | 4 × 100 m relay |
European U23 Championships
| Gold medal – first place | 2013 Tampere | 4 × 100 m relay |
European U20 Championships
| Gold medal – first place | 2011 Tallinn | 4 × 100 m relay |

Katharina "Kathi" Grompe (born 1 September 1993) is a German retired sprinter who competed at international elite track and field competitions. She is a two-time European champion and World silver medalist in the 4 × 100 metre relay. She was described as one of the greatest talents in German women's sprinting during her sporting career.

== Retirement ==
Grompe retired in 2020 to focus on her career as a self-employed professional athletics coach in Hamburg following her retirement from high-performance athletics. She considered to retire at the age of 27 following reoccurring sport injuries.
