= Yuliya Olishevska =

Ukrainian sprinter

Personal information
- Full name: Yuliya Olishevska
- Born: 2 February 1989 (age 37)
- Height: 1.67 m (5 ft 6 in)
- Weight: 60 kg (132 lb)

Sport
- Country: Ukraine
- Sport: Athletics
- Event: Sprint
Medal record
European Championships
Gold medal – first place	2012 Helsinki	4 × 400 m relay

Yuliya Anatoliïvna Olishevska (Ukrainian: Юлія Анатоліївна Олішевська; born 2 February 1989) is a Ukrainian athlete who competes in the sprint with a personal best time of 51.68 seconds at the 400 metres event.

Olishevska won the gold medal at the 2012 European Athletics Championships in Helsinki at the 4 × 400 metres relay.
