= 2013 European Athletics U23 Championships =

- Dates: 10–14 July
- Host city: Tampere, Finland
- Venue: Tampere Stadium
- Level: Under 23
- Type: Outdoor
- Events: 44
- Participation: 934 athletes from 45 nations
- Records set: 7 CRs

The 2013 European Athletics U23 Championships were the 9th edition of the biennial athletics competition between European athletes under the age of twenty-three. It was held in Tampere, Finland from 10 to 14 July.

Russia topped the medal table with 20 medals in total, including 8 golds, before Great Britain and Germany.

== Medal summary ==
=== Men ===
Event	Gold		Silver		Bronze	
100 metres	Adam Gemili; Great Britain	10.20	Deji Tobais; Great Britain	10.29	Hensley Paulina; Netherlands	10.48; PB
200 metres	Karol Zalewski; Poland	20.41; PB	Daniel Talbot; Great Britain	20.46	Pavel Maslák; Czech Republic	20.49; NR
400 metres	Lev Mosin; Russia	45.51; PB	Vitaliy Butrym; Ukraine	45.88; PB	Nikita Uglov; Russia	46.04; SB
800 metres	Pierre-Ambroise Bosse; France	1:45.79	Taras Bybyk; Ukraine	1:46.20; PB	Amel Tuka; Bosnia and Herzegovina	1:46.29; NR
1500 metres	Pieter-Jan Hannes; Belgium	3:43.83	Charlie Grice; Great Britain	3:44.41	Alberto Imedio; Spain	3:44.65
5000 metres	Henrik Ingebrigtsen; Norway	14:19.39	Tom Farrell; Great Britain	14:19.94	Aitor Fernández; Spain	14:20.65
10,000 metres	Gabriel Navarro; Spain	29:43.22	Nicolae Alexandru Soare; Romania	29:43.76	Abdi Hakin Ulad; Denmark	29:44.78; SB
110 metres hurdles	Simon Krauss; France	13.55; PB	Koen Smet; Netherlands	13.58; PB	Gregor Traber; Germany	13.66
400 metres hurdles	Emir Bekrić; Serbia	48.76; NR	Sebastian Rodger; Great Britain	49.19; PB	Rasmus Mägi; Estonia	49.19; NR
3000 metres steeplechase	Abdelaziz Merzougui; Spain	8:34.64	Giuseppe Gerratana; Italy	8:35.55; PB	Tanguy Pepiot; France	8:38.07; SB
4 × 100 metres relay	Deji Tobais; Daniel Talbot; Dannish Walker-Khan; Adam Gemili; Great Britain	38.77; EUR CUR	Remigiusz Olszewski; Przemysław Słowikowski; Karol Zalewski; Grzegorz Zimniewicz; Poland	38.81	Eduard Viles; Adrià Burriel; Bruno Hortelano; Eusebio Cáceres; Spain	38.87
4 × 400 metres relay	Seppe Thijs; Dylan Borlée; Stef Vanhaeren; Julien Watrin; Belgium	3:04.90	Vito Incantalupo; Lorenzo Valentini; Marco Lorenzi; Michele Tricca; Italy	3:05.10	Philipp Kleemann; Johannes Trefz; Benedict Wiesend; Stefan Gorol; Germany	3:05.24
20 kilometres walk	Aleksandr Ivanov; Russia	DQ	Hagen Pohle; Germany	1:25:04	Massimo Stano; Italy	1:25:25; PB
High jump	Douwe Amels; Netherlands	2.28; PB	Daniil Tsyplakov; Russia	2.28	Adónios Mástoras; Greece; Allan Smith; Great Britain	2.26; PB; 2.26; PB
Pole vault	Anton Ivakin; Russia	5.60	Robert Sobera; Poland	5.60	Valentin Lavillenie; France; Daniel Clemens; Germany	5.50 5.50 =PB
Long jump	Eusebio Cáceres; Spain	8.37; CUR	Sergey Morgunov; Russia	8.01	Kirill Sukharev; Russia	7.90
Triple jump	Aleksey Fyodorov; Russia	17.13; SB	Gaëtan Saku Bafuanga; France	16.57	Artem Primak; Russia	16.49
Shot put	Jakub Szyszkowski; Poland	19.78	Dominik Witczak; Poland	19.63; PB	Mikhail Abramchuk; Belarus	19.42
Discus throw	Andrius Gudžius; Lithuania	62.40; SB	Viktor Butenko; Russia	62.27	Danijel Furtula; Montenegro	61.61
Hammer throw	Zakhar Makhrosenka; Belarus	74.63	Ákos Hudi; Hungary	74.06	Quentin Bigot; France	74.00
Javelin throw	Zigismunds Sirmais; Latvia	82.77; SB	Bernhard Seifert; Germany	82.42	Thomas Röhler; Germany	81.74
Decathlon	Kai Kazmirek; Germany	8366; PB	Ilya Shkurenov; Russia	8279; SB	Adam Helcelet; Czech Republic	8252; PB

=== Women ===
Event	Gold		Silver		Bronze	
100 metres	Dafne Schippers; Netherlands	11.13	Jodie Williams; Great Britain	11.42	Tatjana Pinto; Germany	11.50
200 metres	Jodie Williams; Great Britain	22.92; SB	Lenora Guion Firmin; France	22.96; PB	Gloria Hooper; Italy	23.24
400 metres	Lenora Guion Firmin; France	51.68; PB	Mirela Lavric; Romania	52.06; PB	Justyna Święty; Poland	52.22; PB
800 metres	Mirela Lavric; Romania	2:01.56; SB	Olha Lyakhova; Ukraine	2:01.90	Selina Büchel; Switzerland	2:02.74; PB
1500 metres	Amela Terzić; Serbia	4:05.69; CUR NR	Corinna Harrer; Germany	4:07.71	Laura Muir; Great Britain	4:08.19
5000 metres	Layes Abdullayeva; Azerbaijan	15:51.72	Kate Avery; Great Britain	15:54.07	Liv Westphal; France	16:08.85
10,000 metres	Gulshat Fazlitdinova; Russia	32:53.93	Viktoriya Khapilina; Ukraine	33:56.85	Anastasia Karakatsani; Greece	33:57.74; PB
100 metres hurdles	Isabelle Pedersen; Norway	13.12	Karolina Kołeczek; Poland	13.30	Nooralotta Neziri; Finland	13.39
400 metres hurdles	Vera Rudakova; Russia	55.92; PB	Bianca Baak; Netherlands	56.75; PB	Anastasiya Lebid; Ukraine	56.92
3000 metres steeplechase	Gesa Felicitas Krause; Germany	9:38.91; CUR	Yekaterina Sokolenko; Russia	9:49.34	Evdokiya Bukina; Russia	10:03.41
4 × 100 metres relay	Luise Hollender; Leena Günther; Tatjana Pinto; Katharina Grompe; Germany	43.29; CUR	Annie Tagoe; Corinne Humphreys; Rachel Johncock; Jodie Williams; Great Britain	43.83	Laura Gamba; Irene Siragusa; Martina Amidei; Gloria Hooper; Italy	43.86
4 × 400 metres relay	Magdalena Gorzkowska; Małgorzata Hołub; Agnieszka Karczmarczyk; Justyna Święty; Poland	3:29.74	Camelia Florina Gal; Mirela Lavric; Sanda Belgyan; Adelina Pastor; Romania	3:30.28	Lenora Guion Firmin; Justine Fedronic; Louise-Anne Bertheau; Agnès Raharolahy; France	3:30.64
20 kilometres walk	Lyudmyla Olyanovska; Ukraine	1:30:37; PB	Antonella Palmisano; Italy	1:30:59	Natalya Serezhkina; Russia	1:31:50
High jump	Alessia Trost; Italy	1.98 =CUR	Airine Palsyte; Lithuania	1.92 =SB	Oksana Krasnokutskaya; Russia	1.90 =PB
Pole vault	Angelina Zhuk-Krasnova; Russia	4.70; CUR	Anzhelika Sidorova; Russia	4.60; PB	Angelica Bengtsson; Sweden	4.55; SB
Long jump	Lena Malkus; Germany	6.76; PB	Krystyna Hryshutyna; Ukraine	6.61; SB	Dafne Schippers; Netherlands	6.59; PB
Triple jump	Gabriela Petrova; Bulgaria	13.91; PB	Dariya Derkach; Italy	13.56	Maja Bratkic; Slovenia	13.52
Shot put	Olha Holodna; Ukraine	18.11; PB	Shanice Craft; Germany	17.29; PB	Lena Urbaniak; Germany	16.98
Discus throw	Anna Rüh; Germany	61.45	Shanice Craft; Germany	58.64	Irina Rodrigues; Portugal	56.80
Hammer throw	Sophie Hitchon; Great Britain	70.72	Barbara Spiler; Slovenia	69.69	Alexia Sedykh; France	66.67
Javelin throw	Līna Mūze; Latvia	58.61	Sarah Mayer; Germany	55.43	Marija Vučenović; Serbia	54.43
Heptathlon	Katarina Johnson-Thompson; Great Britain	6215	Kira Biesenbach; Germany	5946	Anastasiya Mokhnyuk; Ukraine	5898

== Medal table ==
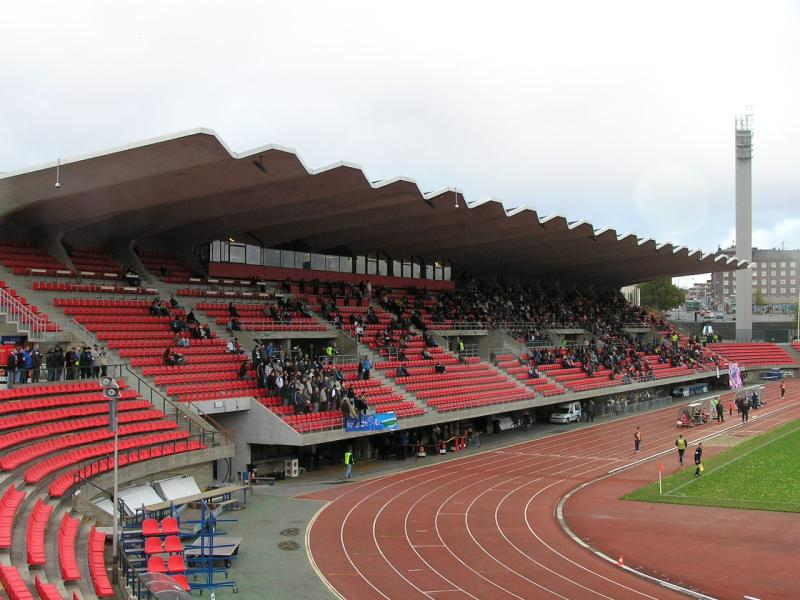
The host stadium in Tampere.

* Host nation (Finland)

Rank	Nation	Gold	Silver	Bronze	Total
1	Russia (RUS)	7	6	6	19
2	Great Britain (GBR)	5	8	2	15
3	Germany (GER)	5	7	5	17
4	Poland (POL)	3	4	1	8
5	France (FRA)	3	2	6	11
6	Spain (ESP)	3	0	3	6
7	Ukraine (UKR)	2	5	2	9
8	Netherlands (NED)	2	2	2	6
9	Serbia (SRB)	2	0	1	3
10	Belgium (BEL)	2	0	0	2
10	Latvia (LAT)	2	0	0	2
10	Norway (NOR)	2	0	0	2
13	Italy (ITA)	1	3	4	8
14	Romania (ROU)	1	3	0	4
15	Lithuania (LTU)	1	1	0	2
16	Belarus (BLR)	1	0	1	2
17	Azerbaijan (AZE)	1	0	0	1
17	Bulgaria (BUL)	1	0	0	1
19	Slovenia (SLO)	0	1	1	2
20	Hungary (HUN)	0	1	0	1
21	Czech Republic (CZE)	0	0	2	2
21	Greece (GRE)	0	0	2	2
23	Bosnia and Herzegovina (BIH)	0	0	1	1
23	Denmark (DEN)	0	0	1	1
23	Estonia (EST)	0	0	1	1
23	Finland (FIN)*	0	0	1	1
23	Montenegro (MNE)	0	0	1	1
23	Portugal (POR)	0	0	1	1
23	Sweden (SWE)	0	0	1	1
23	Switzerland (SUI)	0	0	1	1
Totals (30 entries)		44	43	46	133

== Participation ==
According to an unofficial count, 934 athletes from 45 countries participated in the event.

- Armenia (1)
- Austria (6)
- Azerbaijan (3)
- Belarus (23)
- Belgium (25)
- Bosnia and Herzegovina (3)
- Bulgaria (8)
- Croatia (10)
- Cyprus (8)
- Czech Republic (32)
- Denmark (4)
- Estonia (17)
- Finland (38)
- France (51)
- Georgia (7)
- Germany (69)
- Greece (11)
- Hungary (27)
- Iceland (4)
- Ireland (14)
- Israel (15)
- Italy (73)
- Latvia (15)
- Lithuania (20)
- Luxembourg (5)
- Macedonia (1)
- Malta (1)
- Moldova (2)
- Montenegro (2)
- Netherlands (32)
- Norway (25)
- Poland (56)
- Portugal (22)
- Romania (32)
- Russia (58)
- San Marino (1)
- Serbia (8)
- Slovakia (6)
- Slovenia (12)
- Spain (41)
- Sweden (38)
- Switzerland (17)
- Turkey (18)
- Ukraine (37)
- United Kingdom (36)
