= Małgorzata Hołub-Kowalik =

Polish sprinter (born 1992)

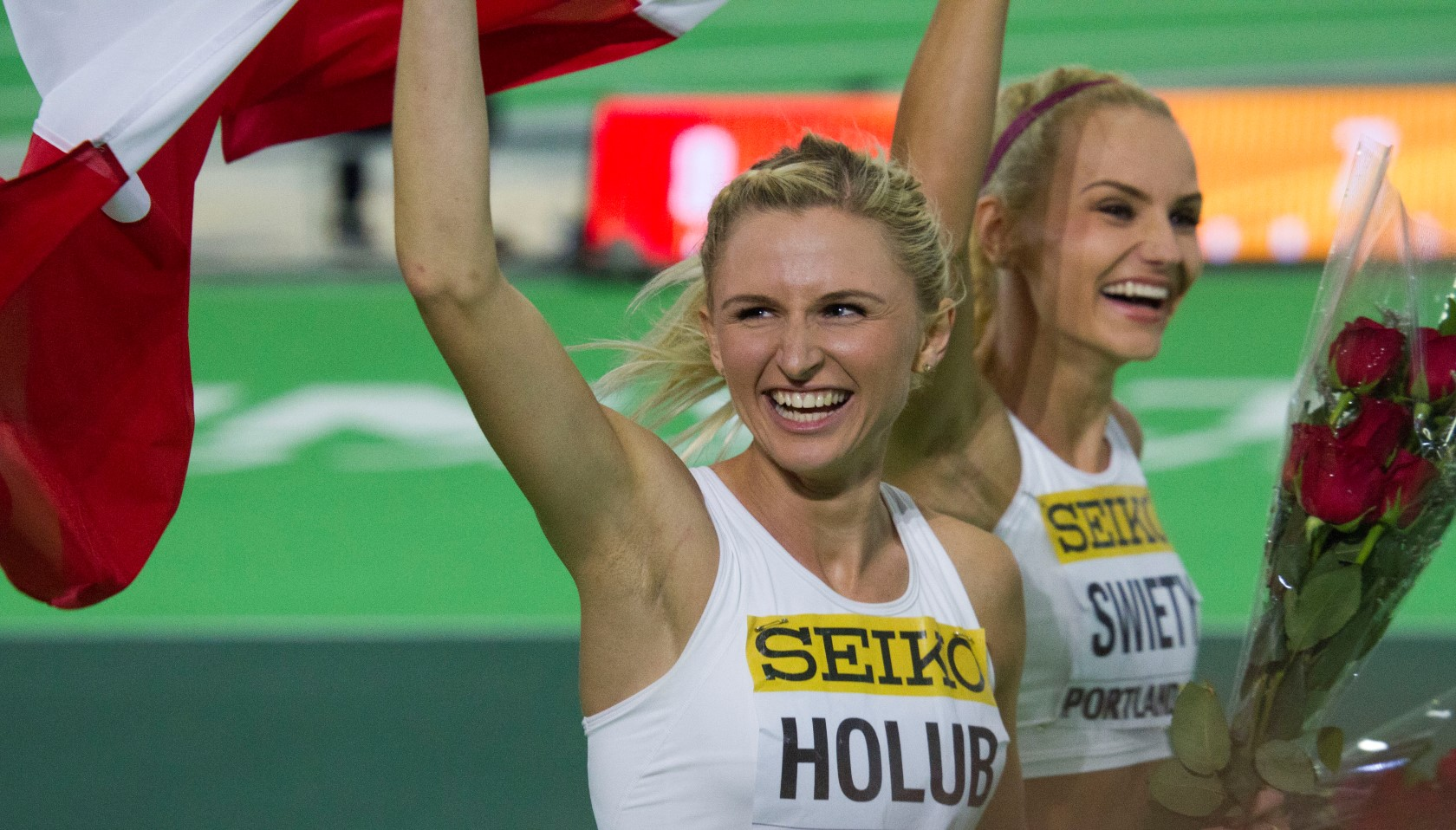
- Hołub-Kowalik and Justyna Święty

Personal information
- Full name: Małgorzata Natalia Hołub-Kowalik
- Nationality: Polish
- Born: Małgorzata Hołub; 30 October 1992 (age 33) Koszalin, Poland
- Education: Koszalin University of Technology
- Height: 1.68 m (5 ft 6 in)
- Weight: 56 kg (123 lb)

Sport
- Country: Poland
- Sport: Athletics
- Event: 400 metres
- Club: KL Bałtyk Koszalin
- Coached by: Zbigniew Maksymiuk
Medal record
Women's athletics
Representing Poland
Olympic Games
Gold medal – first place	2020 Tokyo	4 × 400 m mixed
Silver medal – second place	2020 Tokyo	4 × 400 m relay
World Championships
Silver medal – second place	2019 Doha	4 × 400 m relay
Bronze medal – third place	2017 London	4 × 400 m relay
World Indoor Championships
Silver medal – second place	2016 Portland	4 × 400 m relay
Silver medal – second place	2018 Birmingham	4 × 400 m relay
European Championships
Gold medal – first place	2018 Berlin	4 × 400 m relay
Silver medal – second place	2022 Munich	4 × 400 m relay
European Indoor Championships
Gold medal – first place	2017 Belgrade	4 × 400 m relay
Gold medal – first place	2019 Glasgow	4 × 400 m relay
Bronze medal – third place	2015 Prague	4 × 400 m relay
Bronze medal – third place	2021 Toruń	4 × 400 m relay
World Relay Championships
Gold medal – first place	2019 Yokohama	4 × 400 m relay
Silver medal – second place	2017 Nassau	4 × 400 m relay
Silver medal – second place	2021 Chorzów	4 × 400 m relay
European Team Championships
Gold medal – first place	2017 Lille	4 × 400 m relay
Gold medal – first place	2019 Bydgoszcz	4 × 400 m relay
Gold medal – first place	2021 Chorzów	4 × 400 m relay
Universiade
Gold medal – first place	2015 Gwangju	4 × 400 m relay
Gold medal – first place	2017 Taipei	400 m
Gold medal – first place	2017 Taipei	4 × 400 m relay
Silver medal – second place	2015 Gwangju	400 m
Military World Games
Gold medal – first place	2019 Wuhan	4 × 400 m relay
European U23 Championships
Gold medal – first place	2013 Tampere	4 × 400 m relay
European Junior Championships
Silver medal – second place	2011 Tallinn	4 × 400 m relay
Representing Europe
Continental Cup
Silver medal – second place	2014 Marrakech	4 × 400 m relay

Małgorzata Hołub-Kowalik (Polish pronunciation: [mawɡɔˈʐata ˈxɔwup kɔˈvalik]; born 30 October 1992) is a retired Polish sprinter who specialised in the 400 metres. She won two medals at the 2020 Summer Olympics, gold with Polish mixed 4 × 400 metres relay team and silver as a member of women's 4 × 400 metres relay team.

Hołub-Kowalik represented her country at five outdoor and four indoor World Championships winning multiple medals in the 4 × 400 metres relay.

Her personal bests in the event are 51.18 seconds outdoors (Lublin 2018) and 52.57 seconds indoors (Toruń 2018).

== Competition record ==
Year	Competition	Venue	Position	Event	Notes
Representing Poland
2010	World Junior Championships	Moncton, Canada	8th	4 × 400 m relay	3:42.70
2011	European Junior Championships	Tallinn, Estonia	2nd	4 × 400 m relay	3:35.35
2013	European U23 Championships	Tampere, Finland	4th	400 m	52.28
2013	European U23 Championships	Tampere, Finland	1st	4 × 400 m relay	3:29.74
2013	World Championships	Moscow, Russia	8th (h)	4 × 400 m relay	3:29.75
2014	World Indoor Championships	Sopot, Poland	14th (h)	400 m	53.07
2014	World Indoor Championships	Sopot, Poland	5th	4 × 400 m relay	3:29.89
2014	World Relays	Nassau, Bahamas	5th	4 × 400 m relay	3:27.37
2014	European Championships	Zürich, Switzerland	5th	400 m	51.84
2014	European Championships	Zürich, Switzerland	5th	4 × 400 m relay	3:25.73
2015	European Indoor Championships	Prague, Czech Republic	11th (h)	400 m	53.31
2015	European Indoor Championships	Prague, Czech Republic	3rd	4 × 400 m relay	3:31.90
2015	World Relays	Nassau, Bahamas	5th	4 × 400 m relay	3:29.30
2015	Universiade	Gwangju, South Korea	2nd	400 m	51.93
2015	Universiade	Gwangju, South Korea	1st	4 × 400 m relay	3:31.98
2015	World Championships	Beijing, China	25th (h)	400 m	51.74
2015	World Championships	Beijing, China	15th (h)	4 × 400 m relay	3:32.83
2016	World Indoor Championships	Portland, United States	6th (sf)	400 m	52.73
2016	World Indoor Championships	Portland, United States	2nd	4 × 400 m relay	3:31.15
2016	European Championships	Amsterdam, Netherlands	5th	400 m	51.89
2016	European Championships	Amsterdam, Netherlands	4th	4 × 400 m relay	3:27.60
2016	Olympic Games	Rio de Janeiro, Brazil	19th (sf)	400 m	51.93
2016	Olympic Games	Rio de Janeiro, Brazil	7th	4 × 400 m relay	3:27.28
2017	European Indoor Championships	Belgrade, Serbia	6th	400 m	54.29
2017	European Indoor Championships	Belgrade, Serbia	1st	4 × 400 m relay	3:29.94
2017	World Relays	Nassau, Bahamas	2nd	4 × 400 m relay	3:28.28
2017	World Championships	London, United Kingdom	28th (h)	400 m	52.26
2017	World Championships	London, United Kingdom	3rd	4 × 400 m relay	3:25.41
2017	Universiade	Taipei, Taiwan	1st	400 m	51.76
2017	Universiade	Taipei, Taiwan	1st	4 × 400 m relay	3:26.75
2018	World Indoor Championships	Birmingham, United Kingdom	2nd	4 × 400 m relay	3:26.09
2018	European Championships	Berlin, Germany	12th (sf)	400 m	51.74
2018	European Championships	Berlin, Germany	1st	4 × 400 m relay	3:26.59
2019	European Indoor Championships	Glasgow, Scotland	1st	4 × 400 m relay	3:28.77
2019	World Relays	Yokohama, Japan	1st	4 × 400 m relay	3:27.49
2019	World Championships	Doha, Qatar	2nd	4 × 400 m relay	3:21.89
2021	European Indoor Championships	Toruń, Poland	3rd	4 × 400 m relay	3:29.94
2021	World Relays	Chorzów, Poland	2nd	4 × 400 m relay	3:28.81
2021	Olympic Games	Tokyo, Japan	2nd	4 × 400 m relay	3:20.53 NR
2021	Olympic Games	Tokyo, Japan	1st	4 × 400 m mixed	3:10.44 ER OR (Note: Time from the heats; Hołub-Kowalik was replaced in the final.)
2022	World Championships	Eugene, United States	10th (h)	4 × 400 m relay	3:29.34
2022	European Championships	Munich, Germany	4th (h)	4 × 400 m relay	3:26.05
