= Justyna Święty-Ersetic =

Polish sprinter (born 1992)

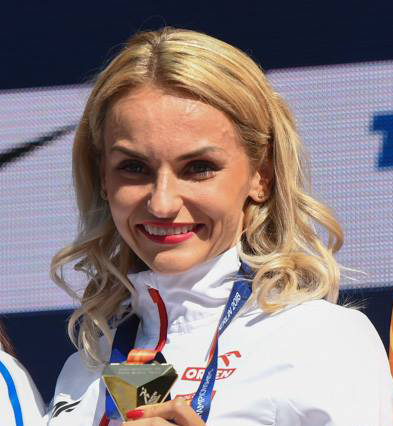
- Święty-Ersetic at the 2018 European Championships in Berlin

Personal information
- Born: Justyna Święty; 3 December 1992 (age 33) Racibórz, Poland
- Height: 1.65 m (5 ft 5 in)
- Weight: 57 kg (126 lb)

Sport
- Country: Poland
- Sport: Athletics
- Event: 400 metres
- Club: AZS-AWF Katowice
- Coached by: Aleksander Matusiński

Achievements and titles
- Personal bests: 400 m: 50.41 (2018); Indoors; 400 m: 51.04 (2022)
Medal record
Women's athletics
Representing Poland
Olympic Games
Gold medal – first place	2020 Tokyo	4 × 400 m mixed
Silver medal – second place	2020 Tokyo	4 × 400 m relay
World Championships
Silver medal – second place	2019 Doha	4 × 400 m relay
Bronze medal – third place	2017 London	4 × 400 m relay
World Indoor Championships
Silver medal – second place	2016 Portland	4 × 400 m relay
Silver medal – second place	2018 Birmingham	4 × 400 m relay
Silver medal – second place	2025 Nanjing	4 × 400 m relay
Bronze medal – third place	2022 Belgrade	4 × 400 m relay
Bronze medal – third place	2026 Toruń	4 × 400 m mixed
European Championships
Gold medal – first place	2018 Berlin	400 m
Gold medal – first place	2018 Berlin	4 × 400 m relay
Silver medal – second place	2022 Munich	4 × 400 m relay
European Indoor Championships
Gold medal – first place	2017 Belgrade	4 × 400 m relay
Gold medal – first place	2019 Glasgow	4 × 400 m relay
Silver medal – second place	2021 Toruń	400 m
Bronze medal – third place	2015 Prague	4 × 400 m relay
Bronze medal – third place	2017 Belgrade	400 m
World Relays
Gold medal – first place	2019 Yokohama	4 × 400 m relay
Silver medal – second place	2017 Nassau	4 × 400 m relay
Silver medal – second place	2024 Nassau	4 × 400 m relay
European Team Championships
Gold medal – first place	2019 Bydgoszcz	400 m
Gold medal – first place	2019 Bydgoszcz	4 × 400 m relay
Gold medal – first place	2021 Chorzów	4 × 400 m relay
Gold medal – first place	2025 Madrid	4 × 400 m mixed
European U23 Championships
Gold medal – first place	2013 Tampere	4 × 400 m relay
Bronze medal – third place	2013 Tampere	400 m
European Junior Championships
Silver medal – second place	2011 Tallinn	4 × 400 m relay
Universiade
Gold medal – first place	2015 Gwangju	4 × 400 m relay
Gold medal – first place	2017 Taipei	4 × 400 m relay
Military World Games
Gold medal – first place	2019 Wuhan	4 × 400 m relay
Bronze medal – third place	2019 Wuhan	400 m

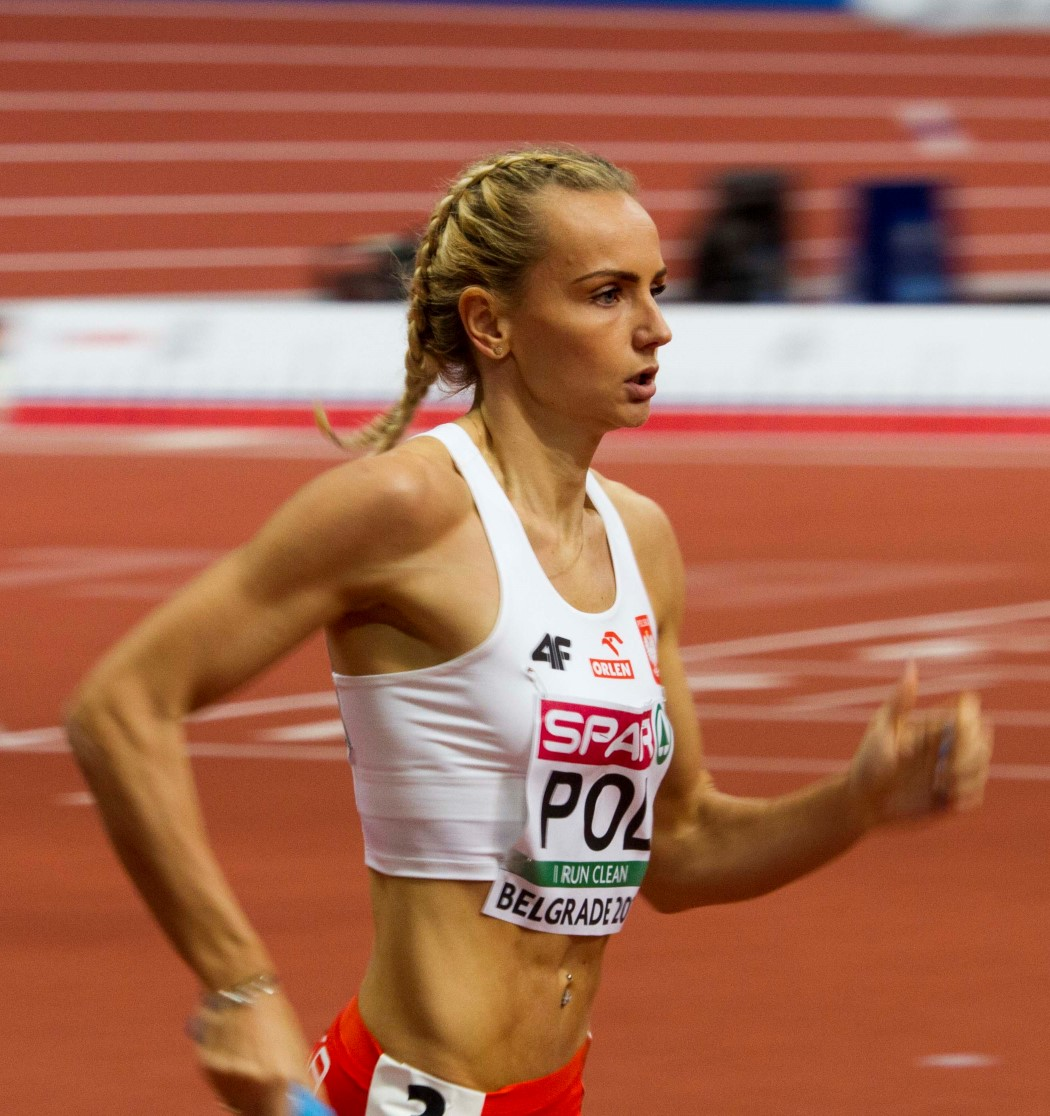
Święty-Ersetic at the 2017 European Indoor Championships

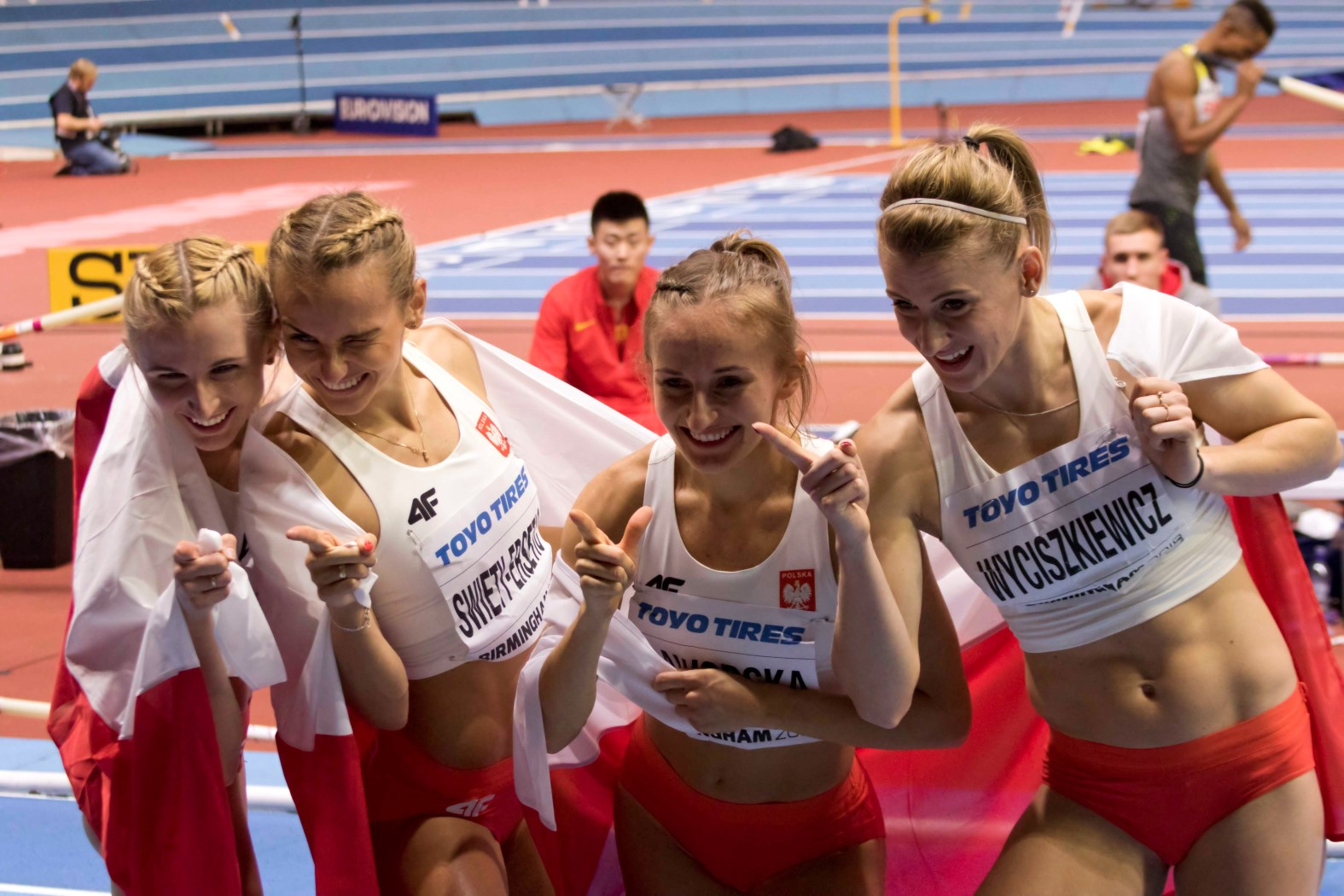
Święty-Ersetic (second from left) at the 2018 World Indoor Championships, with (L-R) Małgorzata Hołub-Kowalik, Aleksandra Gaworska and Patrycja Wyciszkiewicz

Justyna Święty-Ersetic (Polish pronunciation: [jusˈtɨna ˈɕfjɛntɨ ɛrˈsɛtit͡s]; née Święty, born 3 December 1992) is a Polish sprinter specialising in the 400 metres. She was the 2018 European champion and a two-time European Indoor Championship medallist in this event. Święty-Ersetic won many medals at major championships as part of Polish 4 × 400 m relays, including a gold in the mixed relay and a silver in the women's relay at the 2020 Tokyo Olympics.

She is multiple Polish national outdoor and indoor champion.

== Career ==
Justyna Święty-Ersetic competed in the 4 × 400 metres relay at the 2012 London and 2016 Rio Summer Olympics. She won the bronze medal at the 2017 World Championships in the event. At the 2018 European Championships in Berlin, she won an individual gold and later also anchored the Polish squad to the win despite the fact that both finals were separated by less than two hours.

At the 2020 Tokyo Olympics she represented Poland in the 4 × 400 m mixed relay, winning gold alongside Karol Zalewski, Natalia Kaczmarek and Kajetan Duszyński. A few days later, Święty-Ersetic anchored the women's 4 × 400 m relay (Kaczmarek, Iga Baumgart-Witan and Małgorzata Hołub-Kowalik), sealing a silver for the group.

In March 2022, Święty-Ersetic won for the second time World Athletics Indoor Tour in her specialist distance after her 2020 victory, breaking the meeting record in Madrid.

She also competed for Poland at the 2024 Summer Olympics.

Her personal bests in the 400 metres are 50.41 seconds outdoors (Berlin 2018), and 51.04 seconds indoors (Toruń 2022). She was part of teams which set national records for the women's and mixed 4 × 400 m relay (both Tokyo 2021), and women's indoor 4 × 400 m relay (Birmingham 2018).

== Personal bests ==
- 200 metres – 23.81 (+0.4 m/s, Inowrocław 2014)
- 400 metres – 50.41 (Berlin 2018)
  - 400 metres indoor – 51.04 (Toruń 2022)

Relays

- 4 × 400 metres relay – 3:20.53 (Tokyo 2021) NR
  - 4 × 400 metres relay indoor – 3:26.09 (Birmingham 2018) NR
- 4 × 400 metres relay mixed – 3:09.87 (Tokyo 2021) European record

== Competition record ==
Representing Poland
Year	Competition	Venue	Position	Event	Time
2009	World Youth Championships	Brixen, Italy	6th	Medley relay	2:10.01
2010	World Junior Championships	Moncton, Canada	8th	4 × 400 m relay	3:38.96 (Note: Time from the heats; Święty was replaced in the final.)
2011	European Junior Championships	Tallinn, Estonia	2nd	4 × 400 m relay	3:35.35
2012	European Championships	Helsinki, Finland	19th (h)	400 m	53.68
2012	European Championships	Helsinki, Finland	8th	4 × 400 m relay	3:30.17
2012	Olympic Games	London, United Kingdom	13th (h)	4 × 400 m relay	3:30.15
2013	European U23 Championships	Tampere, Finland	3rd	400 m	52.22
2013	European U23 Championships	Tampere, Finland	1st	4 × 400 m relay	3:29.74
2013	World Championships	Moscow, Russia	9th (h)	4 × 400 m relay	3:29.75
2014	World Indoor Championships	Sopot, Poland	4th	400 m i	52.20
2014	World Indoor Championships	Sopot, Poland	5th	4 × 400 m relay i	3:29.89
2014	World Relays	Nassau, Bahamas	5th	4 × 400 m relay	3:27.37
2014	European Championships	Zürich, Switzerland	13th (sf)	400 m	52.85
2014	European Championships	Zürich, Switzerland	5th	4 × 400 m relay	3:25.73
2015	European Indoor Championships	Prague, Czech Republic	9th (sf)	400 m i	53.53
2015	European Indoor Championships	Prague, Czech Republic	3rd	4 × 400 m relay i	3:31.90
2015	World Relays	Nassau, Bahamas	5th	4 × 400 m relay	3:29.30
2015	Universiade	Gwangju, South Korea	6th	400 m	52.44
2015	Universiade	Gwangju, South Korea	1st	4 × 400 m relay	3:31.98
2015	World Championships	Beijing, China	15th (h)	4 × 400 m relay	3:32.83
2016	World Indoor Championships	Portland, United States	5th	400 m i	52.46
2016	World Indoor Championships	Portland, United States	2nd	4 × 400 m relay i	3:31.15
2016	European Championships	Amsterdam, Netherlands	6th	400 m	51.96
2016	European Championships	Amsterdam, Netherlands	4th	4 × 400 m relay	3:27.60
2016	Olympic Games	Rio de Janeiro, Brazil	17th (sf)	400 m	51.62
2016	Olympic Games	Rio de Janeiro, Brazil	7th	4 × 400 m relay	3:27.28
2017	European Indoor Championships	Belgrade, Serbia	3rd	400 m i	52.52
2017	European Indoor Championships	Belgrade, Serbia	1st	4 × 400 m relay i	3:29.94
2017	World Relays	Nassau, Bahamas	2nd	4 × 400 m relay	3:28.28
2017	World Championships	London, United Kingdom	44th (h)	400 m	53.62
2017	World Championships	London, United Kingdom	3rd	4 × 400 m relay	3:25.41
2017	Universiade	Taipei, Taiwan	1st	4 × 400 m relay	3:26.75
2018	World Indoor Championships	Birmingham, United Kingdom	4th	400 m i	51.85
2018	World Indoor Championships	Birmingham, United Kingdom	2nd	4 × 400 m relay i	3:26.09
2018	European Championships	Berlin, Germany	1st	400 m	50.41 EL
2018	European Championships	Berlin, Germany	1st	4 × 400 m relay	3:26.59
2019	European Indoor Championships	Glasgow, Scotland	6th	400 m i	52.64
2019	European Indoor Championships	Glasgow, Scotland	1st	4 × 400 m relay i	3:28.77
2019	World Relays	Yokohama, Japan	1st	4 × 400 m relay	3:27.49
2019	European Team Championships Super League	Bydgoszcz, Poland	1st	400 m	51.23
2019	European Team Championships Super League	Bydgoszcz, Poland	1st	4 × 400 m relay	3:24.81 EL
2019	World Championships	Doha, Qatar	7th	400 m	50.95
2019	World Championships	Doha, Qatar	2nd	4 × 400 m relay	3:21.89
2021	European Indoor Championships	Toruń, Poland	2nd	400 m i	51.41
2021	European Team Championships Super League	Chorzów, Poland	1st	4 × 400 m relay	3:26.37 EL
2021	Olympic Games	Tokyo, Japan	2nd	4 × 400 m relay	3:20.53 NR
2021	Olympic Games	Tokyo, Japan	1st	4 × 400 m mixed	3:09.87 OR AR
2022	World Indoor Championships	Belgrade, Serbia	4th	400 m i	51.40
2022	World Indoor Championships	Belgrade, Serbia	3rd	4 × 400 m relay i	3:28.59
2022	World Championships	Eugene, United States	10th (h)	4 × 400 m relay	3:29.34
2022	World Championships	Eugene, United States	4th	4 × 400 m mixed	3:12.31 SB
2022	European Championships	Munich, Germany	17th (sf)	400 m	52.17
2022	European Championships	Munich, Germany	2nd	4 × 400 m relay	3:21.68 SB
2024	World Indoor Championships	Glasgow, United Kingdom	8th (h)	4 × 400 m relay	3:28.80
2024	World Relays	Nassau, Bahamas	2nd	4 × 400 m relay	3:24.71
2024	European Championships	Rome, Italy	17th (sf)	400 m	52.16
2024	European Championships	Rome, Italy	6th (h)	4 × 400 m relay	3:25.59
2024	Olympic Games	Paris, France	7th (rep)	400 m	50.89
2024	Olympic Games	Paris, France	10th (h)	4 × 400 m relay	3:26.69
2025	European Indoor Championships	Apeldoorn, Netherlands	5th	400 m	51.59
2025	World Indoor Championships	Nanjing, China	5th	400 m	51.97
2025	World Indoor Championships	Nanjing, China	2nd	4 × 400 m relay	3:32.05
2025	World Relays	Guangzhou, China	7th (heats)	4 × 400 m mixed	3:12.70
2025	World Relays	Guangzhou, China	3rd (repechage)	4 × 400 m relay	3:24.56 (Note: Time from the repechage round; The Polish team did not qualify for the final and competed in the repechage round instead.)
2025	European Team Championships, First Division	Madrid, Spain	1st	4 × 400 m mixed	3:09.43 CR, NR, WL
2025	World Championships	Tokyo, Japan	31st (h)	400 m	51.80
2025	World Championships	Tokyo, Japan	5th	4 × 400 m relay	3:22.91
2025	World Championships	Tokyo, Japan	4th	4 × 400 m mixed	3:10.63
2026	World Indoor Championships	Toruń, Poland	15th (h)	400 m	52.15
2026	World Indoor Championships	Toruń, Poland	4th	4 × 400 m relay	3:26.17
2026	World Indoor Championships	Toruń, Poland	3rd	4 × 400 m mixed	3:17.44

== Personal life ==
In September 2017, she married Polish wrestler Dawid Ersetic.
