= Alina Lohvynenko =

Ukrainian sprinter (born 1990)

Personal information
- Full name: Alina Viktorivna Lohvynenko
- Born: 18 July 1990 (age 35) Artemivsk, Ukrainian SSR, Soviet Union
- Height: 1.80 m (5 ft 11 in)
- Weight: 68 kg (150 lb)

Sport
- Country: Ukraine
- Sport: Athletics
- Event: Sprints
Medal record
Women's athletics
Representing Ukraine
Olympic Games
Bronze medal – third place	2012 London	4 × 400 m relay
European Championships
Gold medal – first place	2012 Helsinki	4 × 400 m relay
European Games
Gold medal – first place	2019 Minsk	Team event
European Team Championships
Bronze medal – third place	2010 Bergen	4 × 400 m relay
Bronze medal – third place	2011 Stockholm	4 × 400 m relay
Bronze medal – third place	2015 Cheboksary	4 × 400 m relay
European U23 Championships
Silver medal – second place	2011 Ostrava	4 × 100 m relay

Alina Viktorivna Lohvynenko (Ukrainian: Аліна Вікторівна Логвиненко; born 18 July 1990) is a Ukrainian athlete who specialises in the sprints.

== Career ==
Lohvynenko won the gold medal at the 2012 European Athletics Championships in Helsinki at the 4 × 400 metres relay.

She competed in the women's 400 m at the 2012 Summer Olympics, and the 4 × 400 m relay at the 2012 and 2016 Summer Olympics.

Her personal best in the 400 metres is 51.19 seconds (Yalta 2012).
