= 2011 European Athletics Junior Championships =

- Dates: 21–24 July
- Host city: Tallinn, Estonia
- Venue: Kadriorg Stadium
- Level: Under 20
- Events: 44
- Records set: 9 CRs

The 21st European Athletics Junior Championships were held between 21 and 24 July 2011 in the Kadriorg Stadium in Tallinn, Estonia.

Russia topped the medal table with 18 medals overall, including 8 golds, ahead of Germany and Great Britain.

== Men's results ==
Event	Gold		Silver		Bronze	
100 metres	Jimmy Vicaut; France	10.07; PB	Adam Gemili; Great Britain	10.41	David Bolarinwa; Great Britain	10.46
200 metres	David Bolarinwa; Great Britain	21.07; PB	Pierre Vincent; France	21.22; PB	Jeffrey John; France	21.24
400 metres	Marcell Deák-Nagy; Hungary	45.42; NR	Nikita Uglov; Russia	46.01; PB	Michele Tricca; Italy	46.09; PB
800 metres	Pierre-Ambroise Bosse; France	1:47.14	Zan Rudolf; Slovenia	1:47.73; PB	Johan Rogestedt; Sweden	1:47.88
1500 metres	Adam Cotton; Great Britain	3:43.98	Thomas Solberg Eide; Norway	3:44.70	Alexander Schwab; Germany	3:44.82; PB
5000 metres	Gabriel Navarro; Spain	14:07.06; PB	Bartosz Kowalczyk; Poland	14:07.17; PB	Jonathan Hay; Great Britain	14:07.78
10,000 metres	Gabriel Navarro; Spain	30:02.18; SB	Emmanuel Lejeune; Belgium	31:35.19	Szymon Kulka; Poland	31:50.13
110 metres hurdles	Jack Meredith; Great Britain	13.50	Andrew Pozzi; Great Britain	13.57	Rahib Məmmədov; Azerbaijan	13.78
400 metres hurdles	Varg Königsmark; Germany	49.70; CR	Stef Vanhaeren; Belgium	50.01; PB	José Reynaldo Bencosme de Leon; Italy	50.30; PB
3000 metres steeplechase	Ilgizar Safiullin; Russia	8:37.94; CR	Muhammet Emin Tan; Turkey	8:46.74; PB	Martin Grau; Germany	8:48.79; PB
4 × 100 metres relay	Vincent Michalet; Jimmy Vicaut; Jeffrey John; Ken Romain; France	39.35	Dannish Walker-Khan; Sam Watts; Adam Gemili; David Bolarinwa; Great Britain	39.48	Konrad Donczew; Kamil Supiński; Kamil Bijowski; Tomasz Kluczyński; Poland	40.42
4 × 400 metres relay	Michele Tricca; Paolo Danesini; Alberto Rontini; Marco Lorenzi; Italy	3:06.46	Evgeny Khokhlov; Radel Kashefrazov; Denis Nesmashnyy; Nikita Uglov; Russia	3:07.47	Varg Königsmark; Lukas Schmitz; Lukas Hamich; Johannes Trefz; Germany	3:08.56
10000 m walk (track)	Hagen Pohle; Germany	40:43.73	Ihor Lyashchenko; Ukraine	41:10.43; SB	Alberto Amezcua; Spain	41:34.13; PB
High jump	Nikita Anishchenkov; Russia	2.27	Janick Klausen; Denmark	2.25; PB	Gianmarco Tamberi; Italy	2.25 =PB
Pole vault	Emile Denecker; France	5.50	Kévin Menaldo; France	5.50; PB	Dídac Salas; Spain	5.40 =PB
Long jump	Sergey Morgunov; Russia	8.18; PB	Tomasz Jaszczuk; Poland	8.11; PB	Evgeny Antonov; Russia	7.83
Triple jump	Alexander Yurchenko; Russia	16.31	Murad Ibadullayev; Azerbaijan	16.25; PB	Georgi Tsonov; Bulgaria	15.90
Shot put	Krzysztof Brzozowski; Poland	20.92	Daniele Secci; Italy	20.45	Christian Jagusch; Germany	19.80
Discus throw	Lukas Weisshaidinger; Austria	63.83; PB	Danijel Furtula; Montenegro	63.54; PB	Benedikt Stienen; Germany	62.33
Hammer throw	Quentin Bigot; France	78.45; PB	Serghei Marghiev; Moldova	76.60; PB	Elias Håkansson; Sweden	74.99; PB
Javelin throw	Zigismunds Sirmais; Latvia	81.53; CR	Marcin Krukowski; Poland	79.19; PB	Pavel Mialeshka; Belarus	76.59
Decathlon	Kevin Mayer; France	8124; CR	Mathias Brugger; Germany	7853; PB	Johannes Hock; Germany	7806

== Women's results ==
Event	Gold		Silver		Bronze	
100 metres	Jodie Williams; Great Britain	11.18; CR	Jamile Samuel; Netherlands	11.43; PB	Tatjana Lofamakanda Pinto; Germany	11.48; SB
200 metres	Jodie Williams; Great Britain	22.94; SB	Jamile Samuel; Netherlands	23.31	Jennifer Galais; France	23.55
400 metres	Bianca Răzor; Romania	51.96; PB	Yulia Yurenya; Belarus	53.03; PB	Madiea Ghafoor; Netherlands	53.73
800 metres	Anastasiya Tkachuk; Ukraine	2:02.73	Rowena Cole; Great Britain	2:03.43; PB	Ayvika Malanova; Russia	2:03.59; PB
1500 metres	Amela Terzić; Serbia	4:15.40; SB	Ciara Mageean; Ireland	4:16.82; SB	Ioana Doaga; Romania	4:20.73
3000 metres	Amela Terzić; Serbia	9:17.61; PB	Esma Aydemir; Turkey	9:19.61; PB	Lisa Jäsert; Germany	9:30.23
5000 metres	Esma Aydemir; Turkey	16:12.16; PB	Emelia Gorecka; Great Britain	16:13.04	Annabel Gummow; Great Britain	16:14.62
100 metres hurdles	Nooralotta Neziri; Finland	13.34; PB	Isabelle Pedersen; Norway	13.37; SB	Ekaterina Bleskina; Russia	13.47; PB
400 metres hurdles	Vera Rudakova; Russia	57.24	Aurélie Chaboudez; France	57.35; PB	Maëva Contion; France	58.03; PB
3000 metres steeplechase	Gesa Felicitas Krause; Germany	9:51.08; SB	Gulshat Fazlitdinova; Russia	9:56.98; PB	Elena Panaet; Romania	10:17.37; PB
4 × 100 metres relay	Alexandra Burghardt; Katharina Grompe; Tatjana Lofamakanda Pinto; Anna-Lena Freese; Germany	43.42; EJR, CR	Oriana De Fazio; Irene Siragusa; Anna Bongiorni; Gloria Hooper; Italy	44.52	Marylyn Nwawulor; Bianca Williams; Jennie Batten; Jodie Williams; Great Britain	45.00
4 × 400 metres relay	Katie Kirk; Lucy James; Amelia Clifford; Kirsten McAslan; Great Britain	3:35.29	Patrycja Wyciszkiewicz; Małgorzata Hołub; Justyna Święty; Magdalena Gorzkowska; Poland	3:35.35	Sabrina Häfele; Stefanie Gotzhein; Kim Carina Schmidt; Christina Zwirner; Germany	3:36.26
10,000 metres walk (track)	Elena Lashmanova; Russia	42:59.48; WJR CR	Svetlana Vasilyeva; Russia	44:52.98	Anna Ermina; Russia	46:49.00; PB
High jump	Mariya Kuchina; Russia	1.95 =CR	Airinė Palšytė; Lithuania	1.91; SB	Nadja Kampschulte; Germany	1.88; PB
Pole vault	Angelica Bengtsson; Sweden	4.57; CR	Lilli Schitzerling; Germany	4.20 =PB	Natalia Demidenko; Russia	4.20
Long jump	Lena Malkus; Germany	6.40	Alina Rotaru; Romania	6.36	Polina Yurchenko; Russia	6.11
Triple jump	Yana Borodina; Russia	14.00	Kristiina Mäkelä; Finland	13.67; PB	Ganna Aleksandrova; Ukraine	13.14
Shot put	Lena Urbaniak; Germany	16.31	Anna Wloka; Poland	16.23; PB	Anna Rüh; Germany	16.01; PB
Discus throw	Shanice Craft; Germany	58.65; PB	Anna Rüh; Germany	58.10	Viktoriya Klochko; Ukraine	54.03
Hammer throw	Barbara Špiler; Slovenia	67.06; CR, NR	Kıvılcım Kaya; Turkey	66.74; PB	Alexia Sedykh; France	65.02; PB
Javelin throw	Liina Laasma; Estonia	55.99	Līna Mūze; Latvia	55.83	Laura Henkel; Germany	55.37; PB
Heptathlon	Dafne Schippers; Netherlands	6153	Sara Gambetta; Germany	6108; PB	Laura Ikauniece; Latvia	6063; PB

== Medal table ==
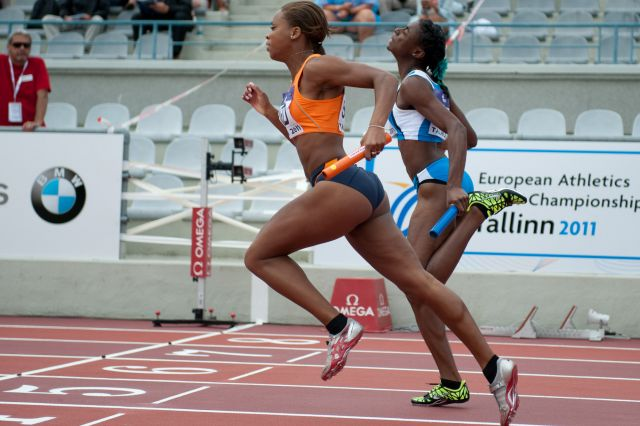
Jamile Samuel, the Netherlands (left), and Gloria Hooper, Italy (right), at the finish of the 4 × 100 m relay heat.

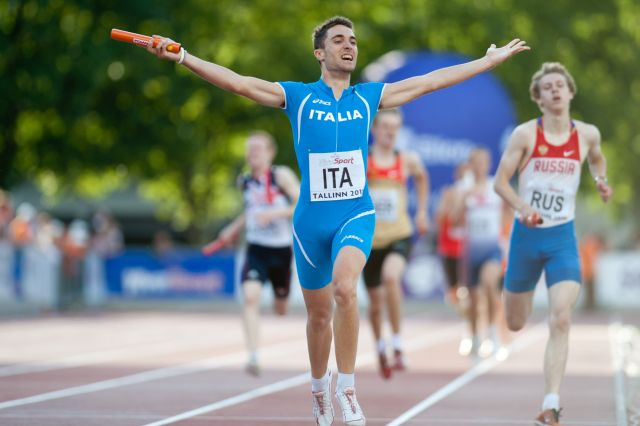
Marco Lorenzi was part of the Italian gold winning 4 × 400 m relay team.

Rank	Nation	Gold	Silver	Bronze	Total
1	Russia	8	4	6	18
2	Germany	7	4	12	23
3	Great Britain	6	5	4	15
4	France	6	3	4	13
5	Spain	2	0	2	4
6	Serbia	2	0	0	2
7	Poland	1	5	2	8
8	Turkey	1	3	0	4
9	Italy	1	2	3	6
10	Netherlands	1	2	1	4
11	Romania	1	1	2	4
11	Ukraine	1	1	2	4
13	Latvia	1	1	1	3
14	Finland	1	1	0	2
14	Slovenia	1	1	0	2
16	Sweden	1	0	2	3
17	Austria	1	0	0	1
17	Estonia	1	0	0	1
17	Hungary	1	0	0	1
20	Belgium	0	2	0	2
20	Norway	0	2	0	2
22	Azerbaijan	0	1	1	2
22	Belarus	0	1	1	2
24	Denmark	0	1	0	1
24	Ireland	0	1	0	1
24	Lithuania	0	1	0	1
24	Moldova	0	1	0	1
24	Montenegro	0	1	0	1
29	Bulgaria	0	0	1	1
Totals (29 entries)		44	44	44	132

== Participating nations ==
954 athletes from 47 countries participating in championships.

- Armenia (1)
- Austria
- Azerbaijan (2)
- Belarus
- Belgium
- Bosnia and Herzegovina (1)
- Bulgaria
- Croatia
- Cyprus
- Czech Republic
- Denmark
- Estonia (host)
- Finland
- France
- Georgia (1)
- Gibraltar (5)
- Germany
- Great Britain
- Greece
- Hungary
- Iceland (2)
- Ireland
- Israel (8)
- Italy
- Latvia (14)
- Liechtenstein (1)
- Lithuania (26)
- Luxembourg (2)
- Macedonia (1)
- Malta (1)
- Moldova (3)
- Montenegro (3)
- Netherlands
- Norway
- Poland
- Portugal
- Romania
- Russia
- San Marino (1)
- Serbia
- Slovakia
- Slovenia
- Spain
- Sweden
- Switzerland
- Turkey
- Ukraine
