= Anastasiia Bryzhina =

Ukrainian sprinter (born 1998)

Personal information
- Nationality: Ukrainian
- Born: 9 January 1998 (age 28)

Sport
- Country: Ukraine
- Sport: Athletics
- Event: Sprinting (400 metres)
Medal record
Women's athletics
Representing Ukraine
European Team Championships
Silver medal – second place	2017 Lille	4x400 m relay
European Indoor Championships
Bronze medal – third place	2017 Belgrade	4x400 m relay
Military World Games
Bronze medal – third place	2019 Wuhan	4x400 m relay
European U20 Championships
Gold medal – first place	2017 Grosseto	400 m
Gold medal – first place	2017 Grosseto	4x400 m relay

Anastasiia Viktorivna Bryzhina (Ukrainian: Анастасія Вікторівна Бризгіна; born 9 January 1998) is a Ukrainian sprinter. She competed in the women's 400 metres at the 2017 World Championships in Athletics. She competed in the women's 4 × 400 metres relay at the 2018 IAAF World Indoor Championships.

Bryzhina is the daughter of the successful Soviet athletes Olga Bryzhina and Viktor Bryzhin, and sister of Yelyzaveta Bryzhina.
