= Elea-Mariama Diarra =

French middle-distance runner

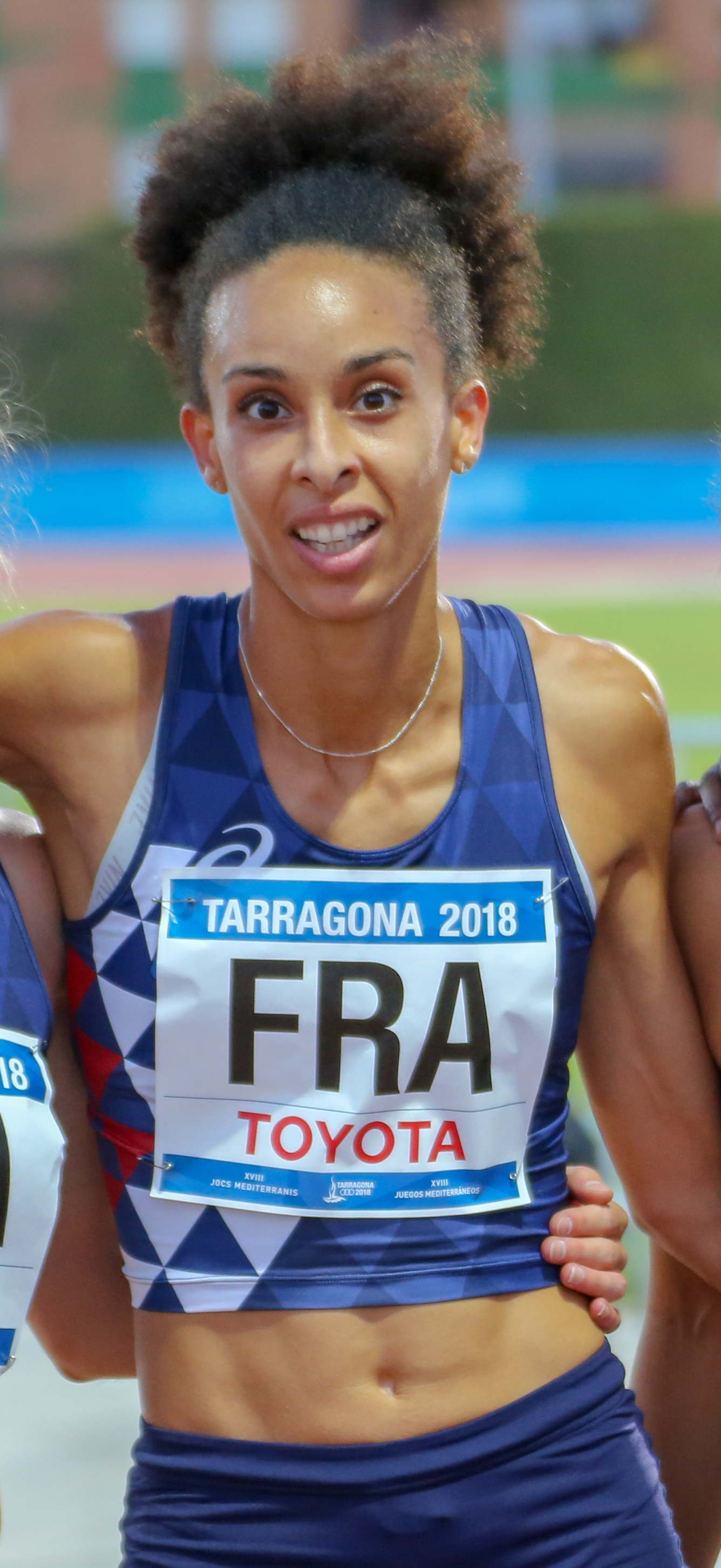
- Diarra in 2018

Personal information
- Born: 8 March 1990 (age 36) Lyon, France
- Height: 176 cm (5 ft 9 in)
- Weight: 56 kg (123 lb)

Sport
- Country: France
- Sport: Athletics
- Event: 400 m

Elea-Mariama Diarra (born 8 March 1990 in Lyon) is a French athlete, specialising in the 400 meters. She runs for Décines Meyzieu Athletics.

== Career ==
She won the national title in the 400 meters at the 2011 French Championships d'Bleach in time of 53.01 s beating Marie Gayot and Muriel Hurtis. In late July in Ostrava, she took third place in the 4 × 400 Metres Relay of the European Championship (Under 21s) alongside her teammates from the team of France.

== Prize list ==
=== International ===
Date	Compétition	Location	Place	Event	Time
2009	Junior European Championships	Novi Sad	3rd	4 × 400 m	
2011	European Championship hopes	Ostrava	3rd	4 × 400 m	
2012	European Championships	Helsinki	2nd	4 × 400 m	
2014	European Team Championships	Brunswick	3rd	4 × 400 m	
2015	European Indoor Championships	Prague	1st	4 × 400 m	
2015	Global Relay	Nassau	4th	4 × 400 m	3 min 26 s 68
2015	Global Relay	Nassau	6th	Medley Relay	11 min 06 s 33
2015	European Team Championships	Cheboksary	2nd	4 × 400 m	3 min 28 s 84
2017	World Championships	London, United Kingdom	22nd (h)	400 m	52.06

=== National ===
- France Championships in Athletics : Winner of the 400 m in 2011

== Records ==
Event	Performance	Location	Date
400 m	52 s 42	Nancy	1 July 2015
400 m Indoor	54 s 02	Eaubonne	14 February 2015
