= Hristina Risteska =

Macedonian sprinter

Personal information
- Born: December 21, 1991 (age 34)
- Height: 1.68 m (5 ft 6 in)
- Weight: 60 kg (130 lb)

Sport
- Country: North Macedonia
- Sport: Athletics
- Event: 400m

Hristina Risteska (born 21 December 1991 in Prilep) is a Macedonian former sprinter who specialized in the 400 metres. She represented Macedonia at the 2012 Summer Olympics. She also represented her country at the 2014 European Championships and 2015 European Indoor Championships.

Risteska served a four-year ban from 2015 to 2019 for an anti-doping rule violation after testing positive for stanozolol, methandienone and norandrosterone.
