= Lénora Guion-Firmin =

French sprinter (born 1991)

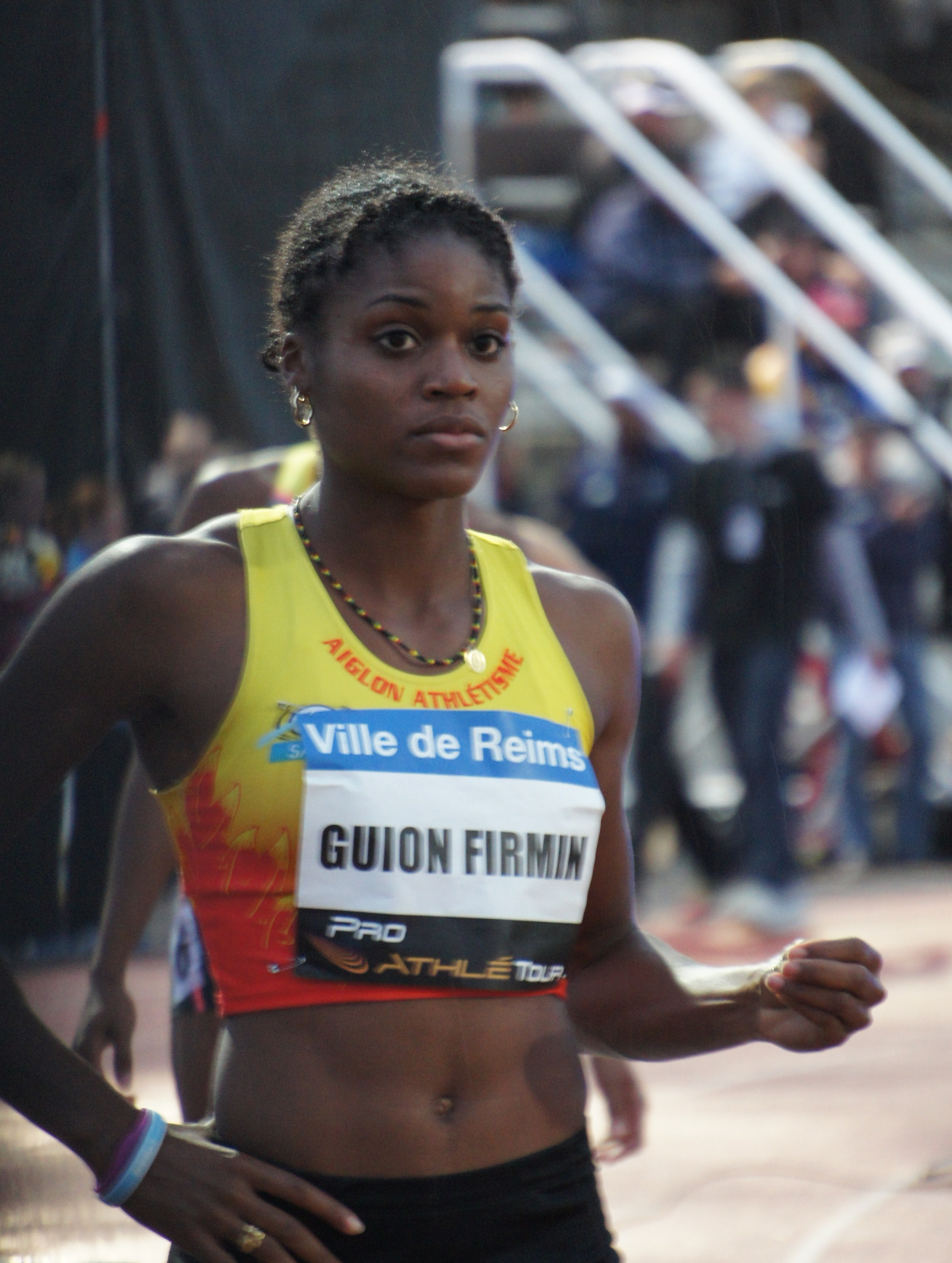
- Guion-Firmin in 2013

Personal information
- Full name: Lénora Guion-Firmin
- Born: 7 August 1991 (age 35)

Sport
- Country: France
- Sport: Athletics
- Event: Sprint
Medal record
World Championships
Bronze medal – third place	2013 Moscow	4×400 m relay
European Championships
Silver medal – second place	2012 Helsinki	4x400 m relay

Lénora Guion-Firmin (born 7 August 1991) is a French sprinter who competes in the sprint with a personal best time of 51.68 seconds at the 400 metres event.

== Biography ==
Born 7 August 1991, in La Trinité, Martinique, Guion-Firmin won the silver medal at the 2012 European Athletics Championships in Helsinki at the 4×400 meter relay.

She competed for University of Tulsa and University of Maryland Eastern Shore. She twice earned All-America status in 2012, reaching the NCAA finals in the 400-meter dash in both indoor and outdoor. She earned the same distinction in 2013, reaching the finals in the 400-meter dash in the NCAA Outdoor Championships. In July 2013, Guion-Firmin captured three medals in the European Championships, U23. She took gold in the 400 meters, silver in the 200 meters and was part of the bronze medal-winning 4x400 meter relay team.
