= 2007 European Athletics U23 Championships – Women's 4 × 400 metres relay =

The women's 4 x 400 metres relay event at the 2007 European Athletics U23 Championships was held in Debrecen, Hungary, at Gyulai István Atlétikai Stadion on 15 July.

== Medalists ==
Gold	Olga Shulikova; Kseniya Zadorina; Yelena Novikova; Lyudmila Litvinova; Russia
Silver	Marie-Angélique Lacordelle; Symphora Béhi; Virginie Michanol; Thélia Sigère; France
Bronze	Hanna Platitsyna; Kseniya Karandyuk; Yuliya Irhina; Oleksandra Peycheva; Ukraine

== Results ==
=== Final ===
15 July

Rank	Nation	Competitors	Time	Notes
1st place, gold medalist(s)	Russia	Olga Shulikova; Kseniya Zadorina; Yelena Novikova; Lyudmila Litvinova	3:26.58	CR
2nd place, silver medalist(s)	France	Marie-Angélique Lacordelle; Symphora Béhi; Virginie Michanol; Thélia Sigère	3:30.56	
3rd place, bronze medalist(s)	Ukraine	Hanna Platitsyna; Kseniya Karandyuk; Yuliya Irhina; Oleksandra Peycheva	3:33.90	
4	Italy	Marta Milani; Donata Piangerelli; Eleonora Sirtoli; Tiziana Grasso	3:34.39	
5	Romania	Taisia Crestincov; Simona Barcău; Alina Duman; Angela Moroșanu	3:35.82	
6	Sweden	Emma Agerbjer; Emma Björkman; Sofie Persson; Pernilla Tornemark	3:37.17	
7	Hungary	Zsófia Rózsa; Mónika Somogyvári; Zsófia Pölöskei; Bianka Varga	3:40.17	

== Participation ==
According to an unofficial count, 28 athletes from 7 countries participated in the event.

- France (4)
- Hungary (4)
- Italy (4)
- Romania (4)
- Russia (4)
- Sweden (4)
- Ukraine (4)
