= 2007 European Athletics U23 Championships – Women's 400 metres =

European Athletes U23 Championship

The women's 400 metres event at the 2007 European Athletics U23 Championships was held in Debrecen, Hungary, at Gyulai István Atlétikai Stadion on 12 and 13 July.

== Medalists ==
Gold	Lyudmila Litvinova; Russia
Silver	Olga Shulikova; Russia
Bronze	Kseniya Zadorina; Russia

== Results ==
=== Final ===
13 July

Rank	Name	Nationality	Time	Notes
1st place, gold medalist(s)	Lyudmila Litvinova	Russia	51.25	
2nd place, silver medalist(s)	Olga Shulikova	Russia	51.57	
3rd place, bronze medalist(s)	Kseniya Zadorina	Russia	51.78	
4	Thélia Sigère	France	52.49	
5	Bożena Łukasik	Poland	52.96	
6	Oleksandra Peycheva	Ukraine	53.29	
7	Faye Harding	United Kingdom	53.70	
8	Annemarie Schulte	Netherlands	53.79	

=== Heats ===
12 July
Qualified: first 2 in each heat and 2 best to the Final

==== Heat 1 ====
Rank	Name	Nationality	Time	Notes
1	Lyudmila Litvinova	Russia	52.64	Q
2	Oleksandra Peycheva	Ukraine	53.50	Q
3	Thélia Sigère	France	53.63	q
4	Maris Mägi	Estonia	53.90	
5	Jitka Bartoničková	Czech Republic	54.04	
6	Mónika Somogyvári	Hungary	55.11	
7	Eleonora Sirtoli	Italy	55.15	
8	Taisia Crestincov	Romania	55.19	

==== Heat 2 ====
Rank	Name	Nationality	Time	Notes
1	Kseniya Zadorina	Russia	52.97	Q
2	Bożena Łukasik	Poland	53.41	Q
3	Faye Harding	United Kingdom	53.42	q
4	Marie-Angélique Lacordelle	France	53.69	
5	Kseniya Karandyuk	Ukraine	54.41	
6	Marta Milani	Italy	54.59	
	Sabina Veit	Slovenia	DNF	

==== Heat 3 ====
Rank	Name	Nationality	Time	Notes
1	Olga Shulikova	Russia	53.01	Q
2	Annemarie Schulte	Netherlands	53.46	Q
3	Alissa Kallinicou	Cyprus	53.69	
4	Tiziana Grasso	Italy	53.72	
5	Symphora Béhi	France	54.46	
6	Irene Høvik Helgesen	Norway	54.61	
7	Emma Agerbjer	Sweden	54.95	

== Participation ==
According to an unofficial count, 22 athletes from 15 countries participated in the event.

- Cyprus (1)
- Czech Republic (1)
- Estonia (1)
- France (3)
- Hungary (1)
- Italy (3)
- Netherlands (1)
- Norway (1)
- Poland (1)
- Romania (1)
- Russia (3)
- Slovenia (1)
- Sweden (1)
- Ukraine (2)
- United Kingdom (1)
