= Adesanya =

- Gender: Male
- Language: Yoruba

Origin
- Origin: Nigerian
- Region of origin: South -West Nigeria

Adésànyà is a Yoruba surname originating from the phrase adé san ìyà meaning "the crown or royalty avenges my suffering". Notable people with the surname include:

- Abraham Adesanya (1922–2008), Nigerian politician
- Ayo Adesanya (born 1969), Nigerian actress, film director and producer
- Solomon Adesanya (born 1985), American politician & business man, Georgia House of Representatives
- Israel Adesanya (born 1989), Nigerian-born New Zealand mixed martial artist, kickboxer, and boxer
- Jason Adesanya (born 1993), Belgian footballer
- Saburi Adesanya, Nigerian academic and writer
- Sekinat Adesanya (born 1987), Nigerian sprinter
