= 2010 European Team Championships =

Athletics team competitions

- Host city: Bergen, Norway (Super League)
- Nations: 47
- Events: 40
- Dates: 19–20 June 2010
- Main venue: Fana Stadion (Super League)

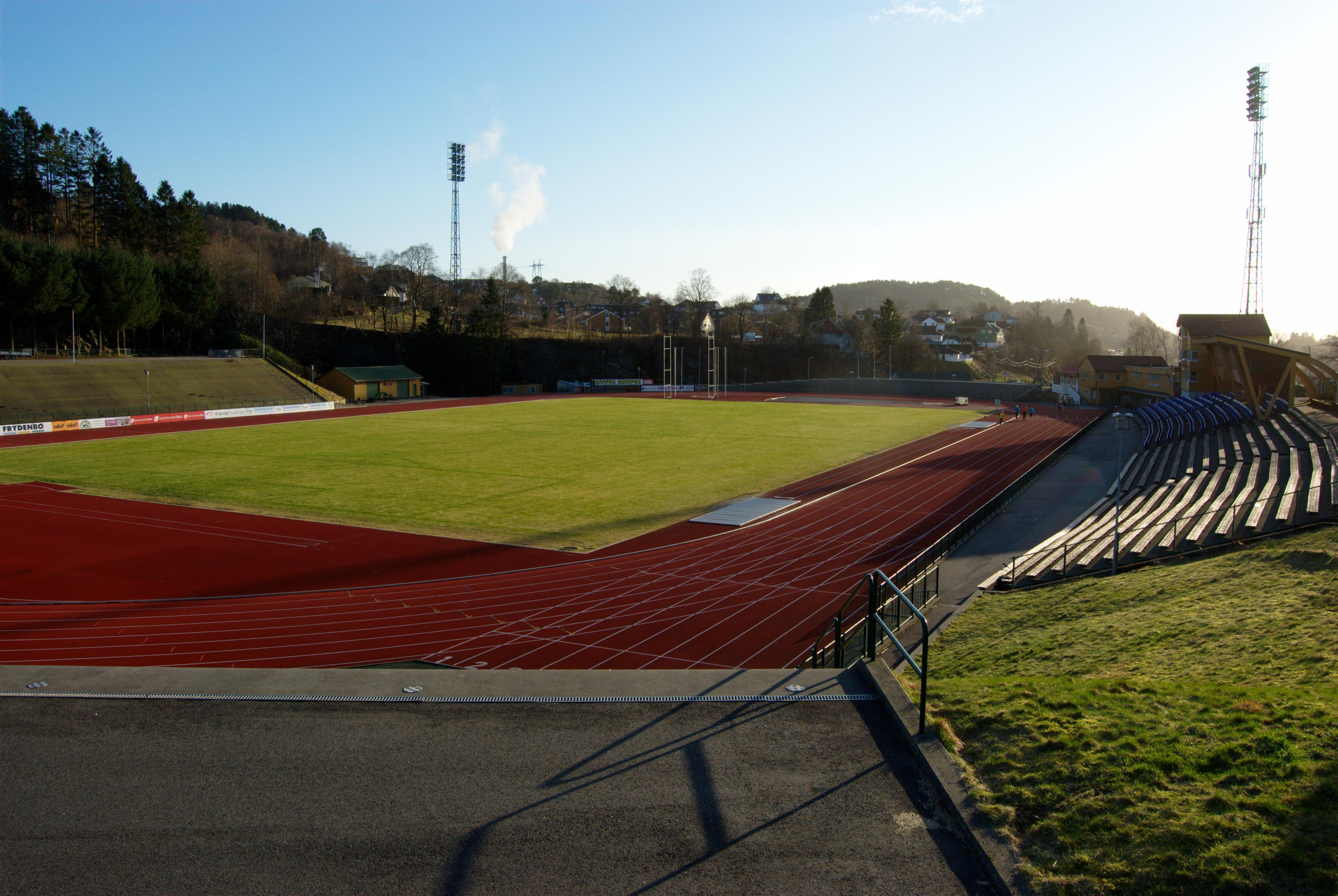
Fana Stadion, the host venue of the Super League

The second SPAR European Team Championships took place on 19 and 20 June 2010. The track and field athletics tournament run by European Athletics was the successor of the old European Cup competition which was held annually until 2008. The 2010 Super League was once again won by Russia, with Great Britain second, and Germany finishing in third.

== Calendar ==
Division	Date	Host city	Host country
Super League	19–20 June 2010	Bergen	Norway
First League	19–20 June 2010	Budapest	Hungary
Second League	19–20 June 2010	Belgrade	Serbia
Third League	19–20 June 2010	Marsa	Malta

== Super League ==
Place: Fana Stadion, Bergen, Norway

=== Participating countries ===
Belarus
Finland
France
Germany
Great Britain
Greece

Italy
Norway
Poland
Russia
Spain
Ukraine

=== Men's events ===
Event	Gold		Silver		Bronze	
100 m	Dwain Chambers; Great Britain	9.99; CR EL	Christophe Lemaitre; France	10.02; PB	Emanuele Di Gregorio; Italy	10.20; PB
200 m	Martial Mbandjock; France	20.55; CR	Lykourgos-Stefanos Tsakonas; Greece	20.69; PB	Sebastian Ernst; Germany	20.77; SB
400 m	Martyn Rooney; Great Britain	45.67	Leslie Djhone; France	45.72; SB	Vladimir Krasnov; Russia	45.74
800 m	Yuriy Borzakovskiy; Russia	1:45.41; CR	Michael Rimmer; Great Britain	1:45.62	Marcin Lewandowski; Poland	1:45.74
1500 m	Colin McCourt; Great Britain	3:46.70	Christian Obrist; Italy	3:46.77	Carsten Schlangen; Germany	3:46.89
3000 m	Jesús España; Spain	8:19.39	Mykola Labovskyi; Ukraine	8:20.01	Valentin Smirnov; Russia	8:20.11
5000 m	Mo Farah; Great Britain	13:46.93	Alemayehu Bezabeh; Spain	13:49.24	Serhiy Lebid; Ukraine	13:49.90
3000 m steeplechase	Tomasz Szymkowiak; Poland	8:31.53	Steffen Uliczka; Germany	8:33.39	Jukka Keskisalo; Finland	8:33.41
110 m hurdles	Andy Turner; Great Britain	13.48	Artur Noga; Poland	13.54	Jackson Quiñónez; Spain	13.67
400 m hurdles	Dai Greene; Great Britain	49.53	Periklis Iakovakis; Greece	50.13; SB	Aleksandr Derevyagin; Russia	50.20
4 × 100 m	Roberto Donati; Simone Collio; Emanuele Di Gregorio; Maurizio Checcucci; Italy	38.83	Jeffrey Lawal-Balogun; Craig Pickering; Marlon Devonish; Tyrone Edgar; Great Britain	39.00	Christian Blum; Till Helmke; Alexander Kosenkow; Martin Keller; Germany	39.07
4 × 400 m	Maksim Dyldin; Valentin Kruglyakov; Pavel Trenikhin; Vladimir Krasnov; Russia	3:01.72; EL	Conrad Williams; Richard Buck; Chris Clarke; Michael Bingham; Great Britain	3:03.50	Dmytro Ostrovskyy; Stanislav Melnykov; Myhaylo Knysh; Volodymyr Burakov; Ukraine	3:04.21
High jump	Aleksandr Shustov; Russia	2.28	Tom Parsons; Great Britain	2.25	Andriy Protsenko; Ukraine	2.22
Pole vault	Renaud Lavillenie; France	5.70	Przemysław Czerwiński; Poland	5.60	Giuseppe Gibilisco; Italy	5.60
Long jump	Pavel Shalin; Russia	8.26; CR	Kafétien Gomis; France	8.09	Chris Tomlinson; Great Britain	7.98
Triple jump	Viktor Kuznyetsov; Ukraine	17.26; PB	Phillips Idowu; Great Britain	17.12	Teddy Tamgho; France	17.10
Shot put	Tomasz Majewski; Poland	20.63	Ralf Bartels; Germany	20.61	Yves Niaré; France	20.35; SB
Discus	Robert Harting; Germany	66.80; CR	Piotr Małachowski; Poland	65.55	Bogdan Pishchalnikov; Russia	63.72
Hammer	Pavel Kryvitski; Belarus	77.79	Nicola Vizzoni; Italy	77.54	Markus Esser; Germany	75.79
Javelin	Matthias de Zordo; Germany	83.80; CR	Andreas Thorkildsen; Norway	82.98	Ari Mannio; Finland	81.71
WR world record | AR area record | CR championship record | GR games record | NR national record | OR Olympic record | PB personal best | SB season best | WL world leading (in a given season)

=== Women's events ===
Event	Gold		Silver		Bronze	
100 m	Véronique Mang; France	11.23; CR	Ezinne Okparaebo; Norway	11.30	Laura Turner; Great Britain; Georgia Kokloni; Greece	11.31
200 m	Yelizaveta Bryzhina; Ukraine	22.71; CR EL	Yuliya Chermoshanskaya; Russia	22.86; SB	Lina Jacques-Sébastien; France	23.06; PB
400 m	Kseniya Ustalova; Russia	51.79	Antonina Yefremova; Ukraine	52.47	Sviatlana Usovich; Belarus	52.91
800 m	Nataliya Lupu; Ukraine	2:02.74	Elisa Cusma Piccione; Italy	2:03.91	Emma Jackson; Great Britain	2:04.53
1500 m	Anna Mishchenko; Ukraine	4:05.32; CR	Hannah England; Great Britain	4:05.70	Natallia Kareiva; Belarus	4:07.98; PB
3000 m	Yelena Zadorozhnaya; Russia	9:08.42	Renata Pliś; Poland	9:08.94; PB	Ragnhild Kvarberg; Norway	9:09.59; PB
5000 m	Sabrina Mockenhaupt; Germany	15:17.38; CR	Joanne Pavey; Great Britain	15:17.87	Karoline Bjerkeli Grøvdal; Norway	15:25.40; PB
3000 m steeplechase	Yuliya Zarudneva; Russia	9:23.00; CR	Rosa María Morató; Spain		Katarzyna Kowalska; Poland	9:43.40
100 m hurdles	Tatyana Dektyareva; Russia	12.68; CR EL	Carolin Nytra; Germany	12.81	Christina Vukicevic; Norway	12.87; SB
400 m hurdles	Natalya Antyukh; Russia	55.27	Eilidh Child; Great Britain	56.48	Anastasiya Rabchenyuk; Ukraine	56.79
4 × 100 m	Yevgeniya Polyakova; Aleksandra Fedoriva; Yuliya Gushchina; Yuliya Chermoshanskaya; Russia	42.98; CR EL	Lina Jacques-Sébastien; Muriel Hurtis-Houairi; Johanna Danois; Véronique Mang; France	43.47	Olesya Povh; Iryna Shtanhyeyeva; Mariya Ryemyen; Nataliya Pohrebnyak; Ukraine	43.72
4 × 400 m	Kseniya Zadorina; Natalya Ivanova; Natalya Antyukh; Kseniya Ustalova; Russia	3:23.76; CR WL	Fabienne Kohlmann; Esther Cremer; Janin Lindenberg; Claudia Hoffmann; Germany	3:26.96	Darya Prystupa; Anastasiya Rabchenyuk; Alina Lohvynenko; Antonina Yefremova; Ukraine	3:27.60
High jump	Antonietta Di Martino; Italy	2.00; SB	Svetlana Shkolina; Russia	1.98; PB	Ariane Friedrich; Germany	1.98; SB
Pole vault	Svetlana Feofanova; Russia	4.65	Silke Spiegelburg; Germany	4.65	Anna Rogowska; Poland	4.40
Long jump	Éloyse Lesueur; France	6.78; PB	Olga Kucherenko; Russia	6.67	Margrethe Renstrøm; Norway	6.49; SB
Triple jump	Olha Saladukha; Ukraine	14.39	Athanasia Perra; Greece	14.37	Yekaterina Kayukova; Russia	14.26
Shot put	Anna Avdeyeva; Russia	19.14; SB	Petra Lammert; Germany	18.31	Chiara Rosa; Italy	17.77
Discus	Nadine Müller; Germany	63.53; CR	Natalya Sadova; Russia	59.59	Kateryna Karsak; Ukraine	57.20
Hammer	Betty Heidler; Germany	73.24	Tatyana Lysenko; Russia	70.21	Darya Pchelnik; Belarus	69.86
Javelin	Christina Obergföll; Germany	59.88	Goldie Sayers; Great Britain	59.25	Mariya Abakumova; Russia	58.24
WR world record | AR area record | CR championship record | GR games record | NR national record | OR Olympic record | PB personal best | SB season best | WL world leading (in a given season)

=== Score table ===
Event		RUS	GBR	GER	FRA	UKR	POL	ITA	BLR	ESP	GRE	NOR	FIN
100 metres	M	8	12	0	11	5	6	10	7	9	2	3	4
100 metres	W	8	9.5	6	12	7	4	2	3	5	9.5	11	1
200 metres	M	2	8	10	12	9	7	5	3	4	11	1	6
200 metres	W	11	8	6	10	12	7	4	9	3	5	2	1
400 metres	M	10	12	8	11	5	6	7	1	3	9	2	4
400 metres	W	12	7	5.5	8	11	5.5	9	10	2	4	3	1
800 metres	M	12	11	9	6	4	10	5	7	8	1	3	2
800 metres	W	0	10	4	9	12	3	11	6	5	8	7	2
1500 metres	M	5	12	10	3	8	9	11	2	4	1	7	6
1500 metres	W	4	11	1	9	12	6	8	10	2	5	7	3
3000 metres	M	10	2	6	9	11	8	7	5	12	1	3	4
3000 metres	W	12	6	3	1	5	11	7	8	9	4	10	2
5000 metres	M	9	12	2	4	10	5	8	3	11	1	6	7
5000 metres	W	8	11	12	3	5	7	6	2	9	4	10	1
3000 metre steeplechase	M	5	8	11	7	0	12	6	3	9	2	4	10
3000 metre steeplechase	W	12	9	4	8	3	10	7	0	11	2	6	5
110/100 metre hurdles	M	4.5	12	6	4.5	2	11	7	9	10	8	1	3
110/100 metre hurdles	W	12	5	11	6	0	8	7	9	4	3	10	2
400 metre hurdles	M	10	12	7	8	9	4	6	5	0	11	3	0
400 metre hurdles	W	12	11	5	4	10	9	8	6	2	1	7	3
4 × 100 metres relay	M	8	11	10	0	7	9	12	3	6	4	2	5
4 × 100 metres relay	W	12	9	8	11	10	7	6	5	3	4	2	1
4 × 400 metres relay	M	12	11	7	6	10	8	9	3	4	5	2	1
4 × 400 metres relay	W	12	9	11	8	10	5	6	7	4	1	2	3
High jump	M	12	11	3	9	10	4.5	7.5	4.5	6	7.5	1	2
High jump	W	11	4	10	3	8	1	12	5.5	9	5.5	7	2
Pole vault	M	7	0	8	12	5	11	10	3	6	9	2	4
Pole vault	W	12	5.5	11	5.5	1	10	9	2	4	3	7	8
Long jump	M	12	10	7	11	2	5	4	1	8	6	3	9
Long jump	W	11	6	5	12	7	8	2	9	3	1	10	4
Triple jump	M	8	11	3	10	12	5	9	7	4	6	1	2
Triple jump	W	10	4	6	7	12	0	8	9	3	11	5	2
Shot put	M	7	8	11	10	6	12	3	9	5	4	1	2
Shot put	W	12	4	11	7	3	8	10	9	6	5	2	1
Discus throw	M	10	2	12	5	7	11	3	8	9	4	0	6
Discus throw	W	11	6	12	7	10	8	9	5	3	1	4	2
Hammer throw	M	6	2	10	9	3	8	11	12	1	4	5	7
Hammer throw	W	11	1	12	9	8	2	4	10	5	7	3	6
Javelin throw	M	8	5	12	1	9	6	3	7	2	4	11	10
Javelin throw	W	10	11	12	3	8	2	6	4	7	5	1	9
Country		RUS	GBR	GER	FRA	UKR	POL	ITA	BLR	ESP	GRE	NOR	FIN
Total		368.5	318.5	307	291	287	278	284.5	236.5	220	189	177	152

=== Final standings ===
Pos	Country	Pts
1	Russia	328
2	Great Britain	324.5
3	Germany	311
4	France	297.5
5	Ukraine	292
6	Italy	285.5
7	Poland	284.5
8	Spain	229
9	Belarus	206
11	Greece	186
10	Norway	188
12	Finland	162

After late doping disqualifications.

=== Records ===
Country	Name	Event	Results	Notes
United Kingdom	Dwain Chambers	Men's 100 m	9.99	CR
France	Martial Mbandjock	Men's 200 m	20.55	CR
Russia	Yuriy Borzakovskiy	Men's 800 m	1:45.41	CR
Russia	Pavel Shalin	Men's Long jump	8.26	CR
Germany	Robert Harting	Men's Discus throw	66.80	CR
Germany	Matthias de Zordo	Men's Javelin throw	83.80	CR
France	Véronique Mang	Women's 100 m	11.23	CR
Ukraine	Yelizaveta Bryzhina	Women's 200 m	22.71	CR
Ukraine	Anna Mishchenko	Women's 1500 m	4:05.32	CR
Germany	Sabrina Mockenhaupt	Women's 5000 m	15:17.38	CR
Russia	Yuliya Zarudneva	Women's 3000 m steeplechase	9:23.00	CR
Russia	Tatyana Dektyareva	Women's 100 m hurdles	12.68	CR
Russia	Yevgeniya Polyakova; Aleksandra Fedoriva; Yuliya Gushchina; Yuliya Chermoshanskaya	Women's 4 × 100 m	42.98	CR
Russia	Kseniya Zadorina; Natalya Ivanova; Natalya Antyukh; Kseniya Ustalova	Women's 4 × 400 m	3:23.76	CR
Germany	Nadine Müller	Women's Discus throw	63.53	CR

== First League ==
- Place: Puskàs Ferenc Stadion, Budapest, Hungary

=== Participating countries ===
Belgium
Czech Republic
Estonia
Hungary
Ireland
Lithuania

Netherlands
Portugal
Romania
Slovenia
Sweden
Turkey

=== Men's events ===
Event	Gold		Silver		Bronze	
100 m	Jason Smyth; Ireland	10.27	Francis Obikwelu; Portugal	10.28	Matic Osovnikar; Slovenia	10.42
200 m	Paul Hession; Ireland	20.46; SB	Johan Wissman; Sweden	20.76; SB	Arnaldo Abrantes; Portugal	20.84; SB
400 m	Jonathan Borlée; Belgium	44.99; SB	David Gillick; Ireland	45.29; SB	Sebastjan Jagarinec; Slovenia	46.19; PB
800 m	Thomas Chamney; Ireland	1:47.86	Jakub Holuša; Czech Republic	1:48.03	Robert Lathouwers; Netherlands	1:48.45
1500 m	Jakub Holuša; Czech Republic	3:43.00	René Stokvis; Netherlands	3:43.44	Kristof Van Malderen; Belgium	3:43.46
3000 m	Mert Girmalegese; Turkey	8:12.85; SB	Tiidrek Nurme; Estonia	8:13.28; SB	Eduard Mbengani; Portugal	8:14.26; PB
5000 m	Rui Pedro Silva; Portugal	13:48.87; SB	Mark Christie; Ireland	13:49.77	Tibor Végh; Hungary	13:53.05; PB
3000 m steeplechase	Alexandru Ghinea; Romania	8:39.78; PB	Dennis Licht; Netherlands	8:39.90; PB	Petr Mikulenka; Czech Republic	8:40.55; SB
110 m hurdles	Dániel Kiss; Hungary	13.32; PB CR NR	Marcel van der Westen; Netherlands	13.61; SB	Philip Nossmy; Sweden	13.79
400 m hurdles	Michaël Bultheel; Belgium	49.82	Michal Uhlík; Czech Republic	50.73	Silvestras Guogis; Lithuania	51.52; PB
4 × 100 m	Ricardo Monteiro; Arnaldo Abrantes; João Ferreira; Francis Obikwelu; Portugal	39.13	Libor Žilka; Jiří Vojtík; Jan Veleba; Petr Szetei; Czech Republic	39.66	Giovanni Codrington; Guus Hoogmoed; Jerrel Feller; Caimin Douglas; Netherlands	39.70
4 × 400 m	Antoine Gillet; Arnaud Ghislain; Nils Duerinck; Jonathan Borlée; Belgium	3:05.28	Máté Lukács; Dávid Takács; Zoltán Kovács; Marcell Deák-Nagy; Hungary	3:06.71	Josef Prorok; Pavel Jiráň; Petr Szetei; Theodor Jares; Czech Republic	3:07.09
High jump	Jaroslav Bába; Czech Republic	2.28; SB	Linus Thörnblad; Sweden	2.25	Stijn Stroobants; Belgium	2.20
Pole vault	Michal Balner; Czech Republic	5.50	Edi Maia; Portugal	5.40	Wout van Wengerden; Netherlands	5.30
Long jump	Michel Tornéus; Sweden	7.98	Marcos Chuva; Portugal	7.96; PB	Roman Novotný; Czech Republic	7.73
Triple jump	Christian Olsson; Sweden	17.29; SB	Marian Oprea; Romania	16.73	Mantas Dilys; Lithuania	16.25; SB
Shot put	Taavi Peetre; Estonia	19.74	Lajos Kürthy; Hungary	19.61	Antonín Žalský; Czech Republic	19.53
Discus	Gerd Kanter; Estonia	68.76	Zoltán Kővágó; Hungary	66.64	Erik Cadée; Netherlands	61.93
Hammer	Krisztián Pars; Hungary	77.83	Lukáš Melich; Czech Republic	72.68; SB	Mattias Jons; Sweden	72.58
Javelin	Tom Goyvaerts; Belgium	78.99; SB	Vítězslav Veselý; Czech Republic	76.25	Csongor Olteán; Hungary	75.40
WR world record | AR area record | CR championship record | GR games record | NR national record | OR Olympic record | PB personal best | SB season best | WL world leading (in a given season)

=== Women's events ===
Event	Gold		Silver		Bronze	
100 m	Lina Grinčikaitė; Lithuania	11.49	Jamile Samuel; Netherlands	11.51; PB	Andreea Ogrăzeanu; Romania	11.55; SB
200 m	Denisa Rosolová; Czech Republic	23.03; PB	Niamh Whelan; Ireland	23.30; PB	Olivia Borlée; Belgium	23.36; PB
400 m	Maris Mägi; Estonia	53.17; SB	Zuzana Bergrová; Czech Republic	53.35	Bianca Răzor; Romania	53.54
800 m	Eglė Balčiūnaitė; Lithuania	2:02.42	Mirela Lavric; Romania	2:02.66	Yvonne Hak; Netherlands	2:02.70
1500 m	Jéssica Augusto; Portugal	4:09.78	Krisztina Papp; Hungary	4:10.76; SB	Binnaz Uslu; Turkey	4:11.36; PB
3000 m	Sara Moreira; Portugal	8:53.65	Krisztina Papp; Hungary	9:06.15; SB	Roxana Bârcă; Romania	9:10.71; PB
5000 m	Elvan Abeylegesse; Turkey	15:09.31; SB	Roxana Bârcă; Romania	15:33.12; PB	Fernanda Ribeiro; Portugal	15:33.58; SB
3000 m steeplechase	Jéssica Augusto; Portugal	9:24.37	Marcela Lustigová; Czech Republic	9:41.85; PB NR	Fionnuala Britton; Ireland	9:42.49; SB
100 m hurdles	Nevin Yanıt; Turkey	12.74	Derval O'Rourke; Ireland	12.80	Eline Berings; Belgium	12.84
400 m hurdles	Zuzana Hejnová; Czech Republic	54.51	Angela Moroșanu; Romania	56.06	Élodie Ouédraogo; Belgium	56.74
4 × 100 m	Esther Akihary; Loreanne Kuhurima; Anouk Hagen; Jamile Samuel; Netherlands	44.45	Claire Brady; Derval O'Rourke; Ailis McSweeney; Niamh Whelan; Ireland	44.53	Emma Rienas; Lena Berntsson; Elin Backman; Moa Hjelmer; Sweden	44.85
4 × 400 m	Jitka Bartoničková; Zuzana Bergrová; Jana Slaninová; Denisa Rosolová; Czech Republic	3:31.69	Adelina Pastor; Mirela Lavric; Bianca Răzor; Angela Moroșanu; Romania	3:33.31	Özge Gürler; Merve Aydin; Meliz Redif; Birsen Engin; Turkey	3:33.50
High jump	Emma Green; Sweden	1.94; SB	Airinė Palšytė; Lithuania	1.92; PB NJR	Oldřiška Marešová; Czech Republic	1.89; PB
Pole vault	Jiřina Ptáčníková; Czech Republic	4.50	Tina Šutej; Slovenia	4.40; NUR	Angelica Bengtsson; Sweden	4.40
Long jump	Naide Gomes; Portugal	6.69	Nina Kolarič; Slovenia	6.47	Alina Militaru; Romania	6.31
Triple jump	Svetlana Bolshakova; Belgium	14.53; PB NR	Snežana Rodić; Slovenia	14.52	Adelina Gavrilă; Romania	14.37
Shot put	Melissa Boekelman; Netherlands	17.91	Helena Engman; Sweden	17.78	Anita Márton; Hungary	17.19
Discus	Nicoleta Grasu; Romania	63.05; SB	Věra Cechlová; Czech Republic	61.59	Monique Jansen; Netherlands	59.28
Hammer	Éva Orbán; Hungary	69.73; SB	Bianca Perie; Romania	66.95	Vânia Silva; Portugal	64.85
Javelin	Barbora Špotáková; Czech Republic	67.63	Martina Ratej; Slovenia	59.77	Bregje Crolla; Netherlands	56.04
WR world record | AR area record | CR championship record | GR games record | NR national record | OR Olympic record | PB personal best | SB season best | WL world leading (in a given season)

=== Score table ===
Event		BEL	CZE	EST	HUN	IRL	LTU	NED	POR	ROU	SLO	SWE	TUR
100 metres	M	3	9.5	2	7	12	1	4	11	5	9.5	8	6
100 metres	W	8	7	3.5	1	9	12	11	6	10	2	3.5	5
200 metres	M	9	8	1	4	12	3	5	10	2	6	11	7
200 metres	W	10	12	1	2	11	5	9	8	6	4	7	3
400 metres	M	12	7	1	9	11	2	6	4	3	10	8	5
400 metres	W	7	11	12	9	6	2	4	3	10	5	8	0
800 metres	M	5	11	2	9	12	6	10	4	1	3	8	7
800 metres	W	5	4	1	2	7	12	10	3	11	6	9	8
1500 metres	M	10	12	1	7	6	2	11	8	5	3	9	4
1500 metres	W	3	6	2	11	7	1	5	12	8	4	9	10
3000 metres	M	7	3	11	6	8	1	4	10	5	2	9	12
3000 metres	W	9	4	2	11	7	5	1	12	10	6	8	3
5000 metres	M	4	6	3	10	11	2	5	12	9	1	8	7
5000 metres	W	3	5	1	9	7	8	4	10	11	2	6	12
3000 metre steeplechase	M	3	10	4	7	5	2	11	9	12	6	8	–
3000 metre steeplechase	W	7	11	8	4	10	1	3	12	9	2	5	6
110/100 metre hurdles	M	3	8	5	12	4	6	11	7	9	2	10	–
110/100 metre hurdles	W	10	8	2	5	11	6	4	1	3	7	9	12
400 metre hurdles	M	12	11	7	5	3	10	2	8	1	4	9	6
400 metre hurdles	W	10	12	4	3	6.5	1	6.5	8	11	2	5	9
4 × 100 metres relay	M	9	11	2	4	8	–	10	12	5	3	6	7
4 × 100 metres relay	W	–	9	2	4	11	7	12	3	8	6	10	5
4 × 400 metres relay	M	12	10	1	11	8	2	9	3	5	6	7	4
4 × 400 metres relay	W	6	12	3	4	7	1	8	5	11	2	9	10
High jump	M	10	12	5.5	2	9	1	7	5.5	3.5	8	11	3.5
High jump	W	7	10	8	3	6	11	2	1	5	4	12	9
Pole vault	M	–	12	6	7	2	5	10	11	3.5	9	8	3.5
Pole vault	W	6	12	4	8	5	3	8	8	–	11	10	2
Long jump	M	4	10	8	7	2	6	5	11	9	3	12	1
Long jump	W	5	1	9	7	2	3	4	12	10	11	8	6
Triple jump	M	1	5	9	4	2	10	7	8	11	3	12	6
Triple jump	W	12	9	7	6	1	5	3	8	10	11	4	2
Shot put	M	6	10	12	11	1	4	3	9	8	7	5	2
Shot put	W	7	8	2	10	1	9	12	5	3	4	11	6
Discus throw	M	3	7	12	11	1	8	10	4	9	2	5	6
Discus throw	W	4	11	5	6	1	9	10	7	12	2	8	3
Hammer throw	M	5	11	3	12	4	–	6	8	7	2	10	9
Hammer throw	W	2	7	4	12	3	1	6	10	11	9	8	5
Javelin throw	M	12	11	9	10	1	3	7	2	8	4	5	6
Javelin throw	W	8	12	4	3	–	9	10	6	7	11	5	2
Country		BEL	CZE	EST	HUN	IRL	LTU	NED	POR	ROU	SLO	SWE	TUR
Total		259	355	189.5	275	240	185	276	296.5	287	205	323	220

=== Final standings ===
Pos	Country	Pts
1	Czech Republic	355
2	Sweden	323
3	Portugal	296.5
4	Romania	287
5	Netherlands	276
6	Hungary	275
7	Belgium	259
8	Ireland	240
9	Turkey	220
10	Slovenia	205
11	Estonia	189.5
12	Lithuania	185

=== Records ===
Country	Name	Event	Results	Notes
Turkey	İzzet Safer	Men's 200 m	21.03	NR,NUR
Hungary	Marcell Deák-Nagy	Men's 400 m	46.22	NJR
Hungary	Dániel Kiss	Men's 110 m hurdles	13.32	NR
Turkey	Yiğitcan Hekimoglu; Sezai Özkaya; Hakan Karacaoğlu; İzzet Safer	Men's 4 × 100 m	40.16	NR
Czech Republic	Marcela Lustigová	Women's 3000 m steeple	9:41.85	NR
Estonia	Jekaterina Patjuk	Women's 3000 m steeple	10:03.95	NR
Lithuania	Airinė Palšytė	Women's High Jump	1.92	NJR
Slovenia	Tina Šutej	Women's Pole Vault	4.40	NUR
Belgium	Svetlana Bolshakova	Women's Trimple Jump	14.53	NR

== Second League ==
- Place: Belgrade, Serbia

=== Participating countries ===
Austria
Croatia
Israel
Latvia

Moldova
Serbia
Slovakia
Switzerland

=== Men's events ===
Event	Gold		Silver		Bronze	
100 m	Ronalds Arājs; Latvia	10.42	Ryan Moseley; Austria	10.47	Dmitriy Glushchenko; Israel	10.57
200 m	Ryan Moseley; Austria	21.08; SB	Ronalds Arājs; Latvia	21.14	Dmitriy Glushchenko; Israel	21.14
400 m	Clemens Zeller; Austria	46.95	Željko Vincek; Croatia	47.69	Peter Žňava; Slovakia	47.85
800 m	Goran Nava; Serbia	1:51.74	Josef Repčík; Slovakia	1:51.94	Andreas Rapatz; Austria	1:51.94
1500 m	Goran Nava; Serbia	3:48.45	Andreas Vojta; Austria	3:49.64	Mirco Zwahlen; Switzerland	3:50.09
3000 m	Gezachw Yossef; Israel	8:09.06; SB	Mirko Petrović; Serbia	8:18.39	Georg Mlynek; Austria	8:20.60; PB
5000 m	Philipp Bandi; Switzerland	14:05.42	Michael Schmid; Austria	14:08.59	Iaroslav Muşinschi; Moldova	14:14.85; PB
3000 m steeplechase	Darko Živanović; Serbia	8:57.87	Noam Ne'eman; Israel	8:59.29; SB	Johannes Morgenthaler; Switzerland	9:03.22; SB
110 m hurdles	Jurica Grabušić; Croatia	13.67; SB	Andreas Kundert; Switzerland	14.04	Viliam Papšo; Slovakia	14.17
400 m hurdles	Milan Kotur; Croatia	51.42; SB	Emir Bekrić; Serbia	50.73; PB	Alexei Cravcenco; Moldova	51.70; PB
4 × 100 m	Pascal Mancini; Aron Beyene; Raphaël Chassot; Alex Wilson; Switzerland	39.74	Asaf Malka; Ram Mor; Micky Bar-Yeoshua; Dmitriy Glushchenko; Israel	40.50	Karlo Stipčević; Dario Horvat; Goran Pekić; Jurica Grabušić; Croatia	40.53
4 × 400 m	Juraj Mokráš; Jozef Pelikán; Josef Repčík; Peter Žňava; Slovakia	3:08.93	Michael Laufenböck; Christian Smetana; Andreas Rapatz; Clemens Zeller; Austria	3:09.37	Andreas Oggenfuss; Philipp Weissenberger; Aron Beyene; Pierre Lavanchy; Switzerland	3:09.71
High jump	Peter Horák; Slovakia	2.18	Dmitriy Kroyter; Israel	2.14	Jovan Vučićević; Serbia	2.14
Pole vault	Yevgeniy Olkhovskiy; Israel	5.15	Mareks Ārents; Latvia	5.10; SB	Patrick Schütz; Switzerland	5.00
Long jump	Jaroslav Dobrovodský; Slovakia	7.85	Alexandr Cuharenco; Moldova	7.72; PB	Yochai Halevi; Israel	7.61
Triple jump	Dmitrij Vaľukevič; Slovakia	17.18; SB	Vladimir Letnicov; Moldova	16.70; SB	Yochai Halevi; Israel	16.32
Shot put	Māris Urtāns; Latvia	21.63; PB	Asmir Kolašinac; Serbia	20.20; SB	Nedžad Mulabegović; Croatia	19.99
Discus	Roland Varga; Croatia	62.24	Gerhard Mayer; Austria	61.16	Vadim Hranovschi; Moldova	59.73; SB
Hammer	Libor Charfreitag; Slovakia	76.77	Igors Sokolovs; Latvia	74.69	Roman Rozna; Moldova	68.91; SB
Javelin	Vadims Vasiļevskis; Latvia	84.08; SB	Stipe Žunić; Croatia	72.59	Martin Benák; Slovakia	71.15
WR world record | AR area record | CR championship record | GR games record | NR national record | OR Olympic record | PB personal best | SB season best | WL world leading (in a given season)

=== Women's events ===
Event	Gold		Silver		Bronze	
100 m	Sandra Parlov; Croatia	11.80	Jekaterina Čekele; Latvia	11.81	Doris Röser; Austria	11.86
200 m	Mujinga Kambundji; Switzerland	24.20	Doris Röser; Austria	24.38	Sandra Parlov; Croatia	24.46
400 m	Olesea Cojuhari; Moldova	53.53; PB	Alexandra Štuková; Slovakia	54.66	Martina Naef; Switzerland	55.06
800 m	Lucia Klocová; Slovakia	2:05.68	Monika Augustin-Vogel; Switzerland	2:07.28	Marina Munćan; Serbia	2:07.31
1500 m	Oksana Juravel; Moldova	4:25.29; SB	Marina Munćan; Serbia	4:25.45	Valérie Lehmann; Switzerland	4:25.64
3000 m	Jennifer Wenth; Austria		Sabine Fischer; Switzerland		Olivera Jevtić; Serbia	
5000 m	Olivera Jevtić; Serbia	15:37.67; SB	Martina Tresch; Switzerland	16:43.60	Natalia Cercheș; Moldova	16:55.54; SB
3000 m steeplechase	Oksana Juravel; Moldova	9:49.92; SB	Andrea Mayr; Austria	10:03.91	Ana Subotić; Serbia	10:11.29; PB
100 m hurdles	Victoria Schreibeis; Austria	13.19	Irina Lenskiy; Israel	13.50	Jelena Jotanović; Serbia	14.52
400 m hurdles	Ieva Zunda; Latvia	56.33; SB	Lucie Slaníčková; Slovakia	58.26	Nikolina Horvat; Croatia	58.69
4 × 100 m	Marlēna Reimane; Ieva Zunda; Sandra Krūma; Jekaterina Čekele; Latvia	45.38	Mujinga Kambundji; Michelle Cueni; Marisa Lavanchy; Clélia Reuse; Switzerland	45.46	Arna Erega; Sandra Parlov; Marina Banović; Maja Golub; Croatia	45.83
4 × 400 m	Nora Farrag; Délphine Balliger; Martina Naef; Angela Klingler; Switzerland	3:37.43	Marija Hižman; Anita Banović; Romana Tea Kirinić; Nikolina Horvat; Croatia	3:37.49	Lucie Slaníčková; Iveta Putalová; Alexandra Štuková; Lucia Klocová; Slovakia	3:40.52
High jump	Blanka Vlašić; Croatia	1.94	Ma'ayan Foreman; Israel	1.87	Beatrice Lundmark; Switzerland	1.87; PB
Pole vault	Anna-Katharina Schmidt; Switzerland	4.30; NUR	Daniela Höllwarth; Austria	3.95	Jelena Radinovič-Vasič; Serbia	3.85; SB
Long jump	Ivana Španović; Serbia	6.78; NUR	Jana Velďáková; Slovakia	6.53	Irène Pusterla; Switzerland	6.47; SB
Triple jump	Dana Velďáková; Slovakia	14.33	Māra Grīva; Latvia	13.28; PB	Mirjana Gagić; Croatia	13.02; PB
Shot put	Sandra Perković; Croatia	15.57	Ana Zogović; Switzerland	15.24; PB	Marina Vojinović; Serbia	13.88
Discus	Sandra Perković; Croatia	63.42	Dragana Tomašević; Serbia	56.45	Veronika Watzek; Austria	55.75
Hammer	Marina Marghieva; Moldova	70.29	Nikola Lomnická; Slovakia	62.78	Ivana Brkljačić; Croatia	61.42; SB
Javelin	Tatjana Jelača; Serbia	58.54; PB	Elisabeth Pauer; Austria	55.58	Kristine Buša; Slovakia	48.60
WR world record | AR area record | CR championship record | GR games record | NR national record | OR Olympic record | PB personal best | SB season best | WL world leading (in a given season)

=== Score table ===
Event		AUT	CRO	ISR	LAT	MDA	SRB	SVK	SUI
100 metres	M	7	5	6	8	2	-	3	4
100 metres	W	6	8	1	7	2	4	3	5
200 metres	M	8	3	6	7	2	-	5	4
200 metres	W	7	6	1	5	4	2	3	8
400 metres	M	8	7	3	5	1	2	6	4
400 metres	W	2	5	1	3	8	4	7	6
800 metres	M	6	5	1	3	2	8	7	4
800 metres	W	5	4	1	2	3	6	8	7
1500 metres	M	7	2	4	1	3	8	5	6
1500 metres	W	4	2	1	5	8	7	3	6
3000 metres	M	6	2	8	3	4	7	1	5
3000 metres	W	8	5	4	1	2	6	3	7
5000 metres	M	7	1	5	3	6	4	2	8
5000 metres	W	2	5	4	3	6	8	1	7
3000 metre steeplechase	M	5	1	7	3	4	8	2	6
3000 metre steeplechase	W	7	3	2	5	8	6	1	4
110/100 metre hurdles	M	5	8	3	4	2	-	6	7
110/100 metre hurdles	W	8	4	7	2	1	3	5	
400 metre hurdles	M	1	8	4	3	6	7	2	5
400 metre hurdles	W	4	6	1	8	2	3	7	5
4 × 100 metres relay	M	5	6	7	3	2	4	-	8
4 × 100 metres relay	W	4	6	2	8	1	3	5	7
4 × 400 metres relay	M	7	4	3	1	2	5	8	6
4 × 400 metres relay	W	3	7	1	2	4	5	6	8
High jump	M	1	3	6.5	4.5	4.5	6.5	8	2
High jump	W	4	8	7	5	2	1	3	6
Pole vault	M	4.5	2	8	7	1	3	4.5	6
Pole vault	W	7	5	4	3	2	6	1	8
Long jump	M	2	4	6	1	7	3	8	5
Long jump	W	4	3	2	5	1	8	7	6
Triple jump	M	2	4	6	5	7	3	8	-
Triple jump	W	3	7	4	7	5	1	8	2
Shot put	M	3	6	2	8	4	7	5	1
Shot put	W	3	8	1	5	2	6	4	7
Discus throw	M	7	8	4	5	6	2	-	3
Discus throw	W	6	8	1	3	5	7	4	2
Hammer throw	M	3	5	2	7	6	-	8	4
Hammer throw	W	2	6	3	5	8	1	7	4
Javelin throw	M	3	7	1	8	2	5	6	4
Javelin throw	W	7	4	2	6	3	8	1	5
Country		AUT	CRO	ISR	LAT	MDA	SRB	SVK	SUI
Total		193.5	200	142.5	179.5	150.5	180.5	179.5	207

=== Final standings ===
Pos	Country	Pts
1	Switzerland	207
2	Croatia	200
3	Austria	193.5
4	Serbia	180.5
5	Latvia	179.5
6	Slovakia	179.5
7	Moldova	150.5
8	Israel	142.5

=== Records ===
Country	Name	Event	Results	Notes
Serbia	Ivana Španović	Women's Long Jump	6.78	NUR
Switzerland	Anna-Katharina Schmidt	Women's Pole Vault	4.30	NUR

== Third League ==
- Place: Marsa, Malta

=== Participating countries ===
Athletic Association of Small States of Europe
(Liechtenstein, Monaco, San Marino)
Albania
Andorra
Armenia
Azerbaijan
Bosnia and Herzegovina
Bulgaria

Cyprus
Denmark
Georgia
Iceland
Luxembourg
Macedonia
Malta
Montenegro

=== Men's events ===
Event	Gold		Silver		Bronze	
100 m	Panayiotis Ioannou; Cyprus	10.42; SB	Nedim Čović; Bosnia and Herzegovina	10.46; NR	Jesper Simonsen; Denmark	10.48; PB
200 m	Nedim Čović; Bosnia and Herzegovina	21.06; NR	Yordan Ilinov; Bulgaria	21.19	Nicklas Hyde; Denmark	21.68; SB
400 m	Endrik Zilbershtein; Georgia	48.45	Andreas Bube; Denmark	48.79	Aram Davtyan; Armenia	49.15
800 m	Amel Tuka; Bosnia and Herzegovina	1:51.43; PB	Christophe Bestgen; Luxembourg	1:51.87	Andreas Bube; Denmark	1:52.40
1500 m	Morten Toft Munkholm; Denmark	3:48.37	Hayle Ibrahimov; Azerbaijan	3:49.59; SB	Ashot Hayrapetyan; Armenia	3:51.88; PB
3000 m	Hayle Ibrahimov; Azerbaijan	8:11.70; SB	Alexandros Kalogerogiannis; Cyprus	8:15.72; PB	Jakob Hannibal; Denmark	8:16.23; PB
5000 m	Alexandros Kalogerogiannis; Cyprus	14:28.12; SB	Jesper Faurschou; Denmark	14:28.39; SB	Tilahun Aliyev; Azerbaijan	14:30.79; PB
3000 m steeplechase	Stephan Alex Jensen; Denmark	9:05.59	Pascal Groben; Luxembourg	9:06.02; SB	Josep Sansa; Andorra	9:08.75; SB
110 m hurdles	David Ilariani; Georgia	14.12; SB	Alexandros Stavrides; Cyprus	14.14; SB	Adnan Malkić; Bosnia and Herzegovina	14.24
400 m hurdles	Minas Alozidis; Cyprus	51.71; SB	Ibrahim Akhmedov; Azerbaijan	52.55; PB	Lazar Katuchev; Bulgaria	53.13
4 × 100 m	Martin Krabbe; Jesper Simonsen; Daniel B. Christensen; Morten Jensen; Denmark	39.98; NR	Denis Dimitrov; Borislav Borisov; Yuri Bozheryanov; Yordan Ilinov; Bulgaria	41.05	Sait Huseinbašić; Ilija Cvijetić; Adnan Malkić; Nedim Čović; Bosnia and Herzegovina	41.35; NR
4 × 400 m	Jakob Riis; Andreas Bube; Daniel B. Christensen; Nicklas Hyde; Denmark	3:08.62	Rosen Danev; Khristo Chenov; Lazar Katuchev; Youri Bozerianov; Bulgaria	3:14.95	Arif Abbasov; Hakim Ibrahimov; Pavel Setin; Ibrahim Akhmedov; Azerbaijan	3:15.07
High jump	Kyriakos Ioannou; Cyprus	2.22; SB	Janick Klausen; Denmark	2.19	Viktor Ninov; Bulgaria	2.10
Pole vault	Spas Bukhalov; Bulgaria	5.40	Rasmus Wejnold Jørgensen; Denmark	5.40; PB NJR	Nikandros Stylianou; Cyprus	4.80
Long jump	Morten Jensen; Denmark	8.16	Arsen Sargsyan; Armenia	7.64	Þorsteinn Ingvarsson; Iceland	7.43; PB
Triple jump	Momchil Karailiev; Bulgaria	16.73	Anders Møller; Denmark	15.66	Zacharias Arnos; Cyprus	15.61
Shot put	Georgi Ivanov; Bulgaria	18.86	Kim Christensen; Denmark	18.81	Óðinn Björn Þorsteinsson; Iceland	18.49
Discus	Apostolos Parellis; Cyprus	60.15; SB	Rosen Karamfilov; Bulgaria	55.73	Peter Berling; Denmark	53.70
Hammer	Dmitriy Marshin; Azerbaijan	70.43	Torben Wolf; Denmark	61.86; SB	Martin Vasilev; Bulgaria	60.03
Javelin	Guðmundur Hólmar Jónsson; Iceland	74.05; PB	Melik Janoyan; Armenia	71.29	Antoine Wagner; Luxembourg	67.90; PB
WR world record | AR area record | CR championship record | GR games record | NR national record | OR Olympic record | PB personal best | SB season best | WL world leading (in a given season)

=== Women's events ===
Event	Gold		Silver		Bronze	
100 m	Ivet Lalova; Bulgaria	11.48; SB	Eleni Artymata; Cyprus	11.71; SB	Anna Olsson; Denmark	12.09
200 m	Eleni Artymata; Cyprus	23.49; SB	Ivet Lalova; Bulgaria	24.07	Hrafnhild Eir Hermodsdottir; Iceland	25.38; SB
400 m	Helena Schmidt Scherer; Denmark	55.62; PB	Monika Gachevska; Bulgaria	56.02	Francesca Xuereb; Malta	56.29; SB
800 m	Luiza Gega; Albania	2:07.39	Teodora Kolarova; Bulgaria	2:08.18; SB	Dagmar Olsen; Denmark	2:09.57
1500 m	Luiza Gega; Albania	4:23.20; PB	Layes Abdullayeva; Azerbaijan	4:23.50; SB	Biljana Cvijanović; Bosnia and Herzegovina	4:26.66; SB
3000 m	Lucia Kimani; Bosnia and Herzegovina	9:45.11; SB	Gezashign Šafářová; Azerbaijan	9:45.58; SB	Yana Georgieva; Bulgaria	9:53.02; SB
5000 m	Lucia Kimani; Bosnia and Herzegovina	16:29.81; SB	Maria Sig Møller; Denmark	16:33.11; SB	Gezashign Šafářová; Azerbaijan	16:34.96; SB
3000 m steeplechase	Layes Abdullayeva; Azerbaijan	10:13.14; SB	Silvia Danekova; Bulgaria	10:16.47; PB	Biljana Cvijanović; Bosnia and Herzegovina	10:39.77; NR
100 m hurdles	Dimitra Arachoviti; Cyprus	13.63; PB	Anne Møller; Denmark	13.93; SB	Kristina Damianova; Bulgaria	14.26
400 m hurdles	Kristín Birna Ólafsdóttir-Johnson; Iceland	58.99	Tsvetelina Kirilova; Bulgaria	59.23; SB	Stina Troest; Denmark	59.73; PB
4 × 100 m	Kristina Damianova; Monika Gachevska; Ivet Lalova; Gabriela Laleva; Bulgaria	45.60	Theodosia Andreou; Ramona Papaioannou; Irini Tsiarta; Eleni Artymata; Cyprus	46.41	Maria Severin; Anna Olsson; Rugiatu Kallon; Tina Brodsgård; Denmark	47.02
4 × 400 m	Monika Gachevska; Teodora Kolarova; Violeta Metodieva; Tsvetelina Kirilova; Bulgaria	3:41.20	Katrine Mikkelsen; Dagmar Olsen; Stina Troest; Helena Schmidt Scherer; Denmark	3:44.16	Hafdís Sigurdjardóttir; Stefanía Valdimarsdóttir; Stefanía Hákonardóttir; Kristín Birna Ólafsdóttir-Johnson; Iceland	3:48.14
High jump	Venelina Veneva; Bulgaria	1.89	Marija Vuković; Montenegro	1.89	Leontia Kallenou; Cyprus	1.80
Pole vault	Mariánna Zahariádi; Cyprus	4.10	Caroline Bonde Holm; Denmark	4.10	Hulda Thorsteinsdóttir; Iceland	3.60; SB
Long jump	Magdalena Hristova; Bulgaria	6.26	Jessie Ipsen; Denmark	5.92	Rebecca Camilleri; Malta	5.89; SB
Triple jump	Andriana Banova; Bulgaria	13.52	Eleftheria Christofi; Cyprus	12.47	Haykanush Beklaryan; Armenia	12.30; SB
Shot put	Mariam Kevkhishvili; Georgia	17.28	Radoslava Mavrodieva; Bulgaria	16.78	Florentia Kappa; Cyprus	14.74; SB
Discus	Gorana Tešanović; Bosnia and Herzegovina	46.83; SB	Maria Sløk Hansen; Denmark	45.82	Alexandra Klatsia; Cyprus	41.63; SB
Hammer	Paraskevi Theodorou; Cyprus	60.64	Paša Šehić; Bosnia and Herzegovina	57.04	Meiken Greve; Denmark	56.49
Javelin	Ásdís Hjálmsdóttir; Iceland	57.26	Nina Otto; Denmark	43.69	Alexandra Tsisiou; Cyprus	42.90; SB
WR world record | AR area record | CR championship record | GR games record | NR national record | OR Olympic record | PB personal best | SB season best | WL world leading (in a given season)

=== Score table ===
Event		AAS	ALB	AND	ARM	AZE	BIH	BUL	CYP	DEN	GEO	ISL	LUX	MKD	MLT	MNE
100 metres	M	6	2	1	10	11	14	12	15	13	4.5	7	8	4.5	9	3
100 metres	W	7	3	1	8	4	5	15	14	13	7	12	10.5	9	10.5	2
200 metres	M	3.5	-	2	9	12	15	11	14	13	10	5	6	3.5	8	7
200 metres	W	7	4	1	5	10	8	14	15	12	3	13	9	6	11	2
400 metres	M	12	-	2	13	7	3	10	8	14	15	5	9	6	11	4
400 metres	W	-	11	2	6	4	9	14	8	15	5	12	10	7	13	3
800 metres	M	-	5	2	12	7	15	9	11	13	10	8	14	4	6	3
800 metres	W	-	15	3	7	11	11	14	8	11	5	9	13	4	6	2
1500 metres	M	-	-	6	13	14	12	10.5	8	15	7	9	10.5	3	4	5
1500 metres	W	3	15	1	5	14	13	11	10	12	8	6	7	2	9	4
3000 metres	M	-	-	10	11	15	7	8	14	13	3	12	9	4	5	6
3000 metres	W	4	-	3	9	14	15	13	11	8	6	10	-	5	7	12
5000 metres	M	-	-	11	12	13	8	7	15	14	-	10	9	-	6	5
5000 metres	W	5	-	6	2	13	15	12	9	14	7	10	8	3	4	11
3000 metre steeplechase	M	-	-	13	11	10	8	9	7	15	5	12	14	6	3	4
3000 metre steeplechase	W	-	-	7	-	15	13	14	11	12	-	-	9	10	8	-
110/100 metre hurdles	M	-	12	2	4	7	13	11	14	9	15	8	10	3	5	6
110/100 metre hurdles	W	-	-	4	9	6	12	13	15	14	7	11	10	5	8	3
400 metre hurdles	M	-	6	5	8	14	11	13	15	9	10	12	-	3	4	7
400 metre hurdles	W	-	-	3	12	6	11	14	10	13	8	15	9	4	7	5
4 × 100 metres relay	M	-	-	3	10	9	13	14	12	15	5	11	7	6	8	4
4 × 100 metres relay	W	–	-	3	9	8	6	15	14	13	7	12	10	5	11	4
4 × 400 metres relay	M	-	-	-	9	13	7	14	10	15	-	8	12	6	11	5
4 × 400 metres relay	W	-	-	3	12	4	8	15	10	14	7	13	9	6	11	5
High jump	M	9.5	-	-	-	12	5.5	13	15	14	9.5	5.5	9.5	9.5	4	7
High jump	W	-	-	8	-	5	7	15	13	12	-	9.5	11	9.5	6	14
Pole vault	M	–	-	8	-	9	10	15	13	14	-	12	11	-	7	6
Pole vault	W	10	-	9	-	-	-	12	15	14	-	13	11	-	-	-
Long jump	M	4	12	1	14	10	3	11	9	15	5	13	6	7	8	2
Long jump	W	3	10	1	7	6	5	15	11	14	9	12	2	4	13	8
Triple jump	M	8	-	2	10	12	7	15	13	14	3	9	4	11	6	5
Triple jump	W	-	-	6	13	10	11	15	14	8	-	9	-	7	12	-
Shot put	M	1	12	2	3	8	5	15	11	14	10	13	7	6	4	9
Shot put	W	-	-	3	10	6	9	14	13	11	15	12	7	5	4	8
Discus throw	M	2	-	7	6	4	12	14	15	13	10	9	11	5	3	8
Discus throw	W	-	-	5	7	10	15	12	13	14	8	11	6	5	9	3
Hammer throw	M	5	-	7	9	15	-	13	12	14	-	-	11	6	8	10
Hammer throw	W	-	-	7	10	5	14	11	15	13	-	12	9	4	8	6
Javelin throw	M	-	-	5	14	6	3	11	10	12	9	15	13	8	4	7
Javelin throw	W	4	-	3	11	5	7	12	13	14	-	15	10	8	6	9
Country		AAS	ALB	AND	ARM	AZE	BIH	BUL	CYP	DEN	GEO	ISL	LUX	MKD	MLT	MNE
Total		94	107	163	324	364	365.5	508.5	480	519	232	400	341.5	210	287.5	214

=== Final standings ===
Pos	Country	Pts
1	Denmark	519
2	Bulgaria	508.5
3	Cyprus	480
4	Iceland	400
5	Bosnia and Herzegovina	365.5
6	Azerbaijan	364
7	Luxembourg	341.5
8	Armenia	324
9	Malta	287.5
10	Georgia	232
11	Montenegro	214
12	Macedonia	210
13	Andorra	163
14	Albania	107
15	AASSE	94

=== Records ===
Country	Name	Event	Results	Notes
Bosnia and Herzegovina	Nedim Čović	Men's 100 m	10.46	NR
Bosnia and Herzegovina	Nedim Čović	Men's 200 m	21.06	NR
Bosnia and Herzegovina	Sait Huseinbašić; Ilija Cvijetić; Adnan Malkić; Nedim Čović	Men's 4 × 100 m relay	41.35	NR
Bosnia and Herzegovina	Biljana Cvijanović	Women's 3000 m steeplechase	10:39.77	NR
Denmark	Martin Krabbe; Jesper Simonsen; Daniel B. Christensen; Morten Jensen	Men's 4 × 100 m relay	39.98	NR
Denmark	Rasmus Wejnold Jørgensen	Men's Pole Vault	5.40	NJR
Armenia	Amaliya Sharoyan	Women's 400 m hurdles	1:00.89	NR
Armenia	Kristine Harutyunyan	Women's Javelin throw	39.76	NR
Malta	Marija Sciberras	Women's 100 m hurdles	15.25	NR
