= 2006 World Junior Championships in Athletics – Women's 400 metres =

The women's 400 metres event at the 2006 World Junior Championships in Athletics was held in Beijing, China, at Chaoyang Sports Centre on 15, 16 and 17 August.

== Medalists ==
Gold	Danijela Grgić; Croatia
Silver	Sonita Sutherland; Jamaica
Bronze	Nawal El-Jack; Sudan

== Results ==
=== Final ===
17 August

Rank	Name	Nationality	Time	Notes
1st place, gold medalist(s)	Danijela Grgić	Croatia	50.78	
2nd place, silver medalist(s)	Sonita Sutherland	Jamaica	51.42	
3rd place, bronze medalist(s)	Nawal El-Jack	Sudan	51.67	
4	Ksenia Zadorina	Russia	51.99	
5	Jessica Beard	United States	52.51	
6	Sekinat Adesanya	Nigeria	52.71	
7	Li Xueji	China	52.84	
8	Shade Abugan	Nigeria	52.87	

=== Semifinals ===
16 August

==== Semifinal 1 ====
Rank	Name	Nationality	Time	Notes
1	Ksenia Zadorina	Russia	51.94	Q
2	Sekinat Adesanya	Nigeria	52.48	Q
3	Racheal Nachula	Zambia	53.05	
4	Brandi Cross	United States	53.25	
5	Marie-Angélique Lacordelle	France	53.82	
6	Olga Mihailchenko	Ukraine	54.83	
7	Benedikte Hauge	Norway	54.89	
8	Désirée Meyer	Germany	55.17	

==== Semifinal 2 ====
Rank	Name	Nationality	Time	Notes
1	Nawal El-Jack	Sudan	51.84	Q
2	Danijela Grgić	Croatia	52.00	Q
3	Wen Xiuyun	China	53.31	
4	Carline Muir	Canada	53.37	
5	Maris Mägi	Estonia	53.74	
6	Marta Milani	Italy	54.83	
7	Rita Nemes	Hungary	54.93	
8	Sofie Persson	Sweden	55.52	

==== Semifinal 3 ====
Rank	Name	Nationality	Time	Notes
1	Sonita Sutherland	Jamaica	51.67	Q
2	Shade Abugan	Nigeria	52.49	Q
3	Li Xueji	China	52.62	q
4	Jessica Beard	United States	52.97	q
5	Angeline Blackburn	Australia	54.03	
6	Janin Lindenberg	Germany	54.06	
7	Alejandra Idrobo	Colombia	55.27	
8	Arista Hefer	South Africa	55.64	

=== Heats ===
15 August

==== Heat 1 ====
Rank	Name	Nationality	Time	Notes
1	Sonita Sutherland	Jamaica	52.88	Q
2	Li Xueji	China	53.39	Q
3	Janin Lindenberg	Germany	55.01	Q
4	Sofie Persson	Sweden	55.44	Q
5	Anja Puc	Slovenia	55.66	
6	Merica Moncherry	Saint Lucia	56.97	
7	Amuchelani Tumelano	Botswana	57.92	

==== Heat 2 ====
Rank	Name	Nationality	Time	Notes
1	Jessica Beard	United States	53.61	Q
2	Shade Abugan	Nigeria	53.77	Q
3	Olga Mihailchenko	Ukraine	55.32	Q
4	Désirée Meyer	Germany	55.47	Q
5	Eleonora Sirtoli	Italy	55.87	
6	Bianka Varga	Hungary	56.88	
7	Tyfia Lee	U.S. Virgin Islands	57.82	
8	Batgereliin Möngöntuyaa	Mongolia	58.82	

==== Heat 3 ====
Rank	Name	Nationality	Time	Notes
1	Sekinat Adesanya	Nigeria	53.13	Q
2	Danijela Grgić	Croatia	53.20	Q
3	Racheal Nachula	Zambia	53.40	Q
4	Marie-Angélique Lacordelle	France	54.40	Q
5	Alejandra Idrobo	Colombia	54.88	q
6	Benedikte Hauge	Norway	55.05	q
7	Arista Hefer	South Africa	55.20	q
8	Chimene Ningayo	Central African Republic	60.18	

==== Heat 4 ====
Rank	Name	Nationality	Time	Notes
1	Ksenia Zadorina	Russia	53.15	Q
2	Carline Muir	Canada	53.25	Q
3	Wen Xiuyun	China	53.90	Q
4	Marta Milani	Italy	55.46	Q
5	Anamaria Ioniță	Romania	55.81	
6	Jacqueline Davies	Australia	56.13	
7	Machettira Poovamma	India	56.39	

==== Heat 5 ====
Rank	Name	Nationality	Time	Notes
1	Nawal El-Jack	Sudan	52.49	Q
2	Brandi Cross	United States	53.69	Q
3	Maris Mägi	Estonia	54.76	Q
4	Angeline Blackburn	Australia	54.76	Q
5	Rita Nemes	Hungary	55.26	q
6	Alexandra Štuková	Slovakia	56.41	
7	Khumoetsile Ngope	Botswana	58.94	
8	Bianca Dougan	British Virgin Islands	59.09	

== Participation ==
According to an unofficial count, 38 athletes from 30 countries participated in the event.

- Australia (2)
- Botswana (2)
- British Virgin Islands (1)
- Canada (1)
- Central African Republic (1)
- China (2)
- Colombia (1)
- Croatia (1)
- Estonia (1)
- France (1)
- Germany (2)
- Hungary (2)
- India (1)
- Italy (2)
- Jamaica (1)
- Mongolia (1)
- Nigeria (2)
- Norway (1)
- Romania (1)
- Russia (1)
- Saint Lucia (1)
- Slovakia (1)
- Slovenia (1)
- South Africa (1)
- Sudan (1)
- Sweden (1)
- Ukraine (1)
- United States (2)
- U.S. Virgin Islands (1)
- Zambia (1)
