= Marta Milani =

Italian sprinter (born 1987)

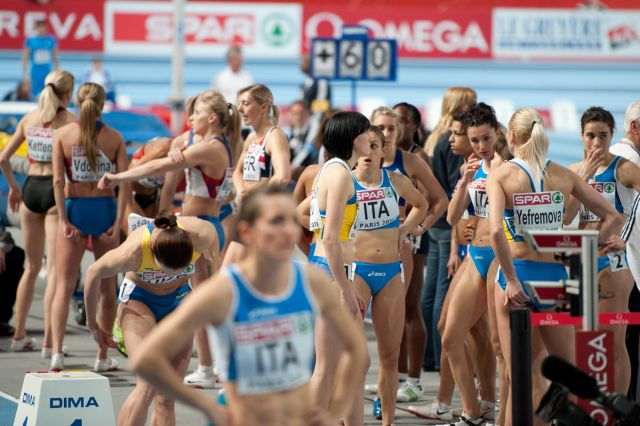
- Marta Milani, 2nd from right with the "ITA" blue jersey.

Personal information
- Nationality: Italian
- Born: March 9, 1987 (age 39) Treviglio, Italy
- Height: 1.74 m (5 ft 8 1/2 in)
- Weight: 61 kg (134 lb)

Sport
- Country: Italy
- Sport: Athletics
- Event(s): 400 metres 800 metres
- Club: C.S. Esercito
- Coached by: Saro Naso

Achievements and titles
- Personal bests: 400 m: 51.86 (2012); 800 m: 2:01.35 (2012)
Medal record
European Championships
Bronze medal – third place	2010 Barcelona	4x400 m relay
European Indoor Championships
Bronze medal – third place	2019 Glasgow	4×400 m relay

Marta Milani (born 9 March 1987) is an Italian sprint athlete, who specializes in the 400 metres.

== National records ==
- 4x400 metres relay indoor: 3:31.99 ( (Poland) Sopot, 8 March 2014) - with Maria Enrica Spacca, Chiara Bazzoni, Elena Maria Bonfanti

== Achievements ==
Year	Competition	Venue	Position	Event	Notes
Representing Italy
2004	World Junior Championships	Grosseto, Italy	12th (h)	4 × 400 m relay	3:41.53
2006	World Junior Championships	Beijing, China	17th (sf)	400m	54.83
2007	European U23 Championships	Debrecen, Hungary	16th (h)	400m	54.59
2007	European U23 Championships	Debrecen, Hungary	4th	4 × 400 m relay	3:34.39
2009	European Team Championships	Leiria, Portugal	2nd	4 × 400 m	3:28.77
2009	European U23 Championships	Kaunas, Lithuania	6th	400m	52.94
2009	European U23 Championships	Kaunas, Lithuania	5th	4 × 400 m relay	3:32.92
2009	World Championships	Berlin, Germany	12th	4 × 400 m	3:31.05
2010	European Championships	Barcelona, Spain	7th	400 m	51.87
2010	European Championships	Barcelona, Spain	3rd	4 × 400 m	3:25.71
2011	European Indoor Championships	Paris, France	6th	400 m	53.23

== National titles ==
He won 7 national championships at individual senior level.

- Italian Athletics Championships
  - 400 m: 2011
  - 800 m: 2012, 2013, 2014
- Italian Indoor Athletics Championships
  - 400 m: 2010, 2011
  - 800 m: 2014

== See also ==
- Italian all-time top lists - 400 metres
