= Guðmundur Hólmar Jónsson =

Icelandic javelin thrower

Guðmundur Hólmar Jónsson (born April 28, 1979 in Akureyri) is a javelin thrower from Iceland. He won the 2010 European Team Championships, Third League, in javelin throw. Jónsson also became the Icelandic Champion in javelin throw in 2009 and 2010.

== Achievements ==
| Year | Tournament | Venue | Result | Extra |
|---|---|---|---|---|
| 2010 | European Team Championships | Marsa, Malta | 1st | Javelin throw |

== Personal best ==
- Javelin throw - 74.05 (2010)
