= Athletics at the 2007 Summer Universiade – Women's 4 × 400 metres relay =

The women's 4 × 400 metres relay event at the 2007 Summer Universiade was held on 14 July.

== Results ==
=== Final ===
Rank	Nation	Athletes	Time	Notes
1st place, gold medalist(s)	Ukraine	Nataliya Pyhyda, Antonina Yefremova, Olha Zavhorodnya, Oksana Shcherbak	3:29.59	
2nd place, silver medalist(s)	Russia	Olga Shulikova, Elena Voinova, Anastasia Kochetova, Ksenia Zadorina	3:30.49	
3rd place, bronze medalist(s)	Great Britain	Kelly Massey, Laura Finucane, Kadi-Ann Thomas, Faye Harding	3:33.70	
4	Lithuania	Lina Andrijauskaitė, Jekaterina Šakovič, Edita Lingytė, Jūratė Kudirkaitė	3:33.70	
5	Thailand	Buatip Boonprasert, Saowalee Kaewchuay, Sirinya Sukwichai, Waeowta Kongchan	3:45.37	
6	Ghana	Frimpomaa Limian Kyei, Rashida Ayumah, Olivia Kyere-Boateng, Edwina Judith Nanevie	3:58.49	
	Kazakhstan		DNS	
	Pakistan		DNS	
