= Elena Maria Bonfanti =

Italian sprinter (born 1988)

Personal information
- Full name: Elena Maria Bonfanti
- Nationality: Italian
- Born: 9 July 1988 (age 37) Milan, Italy
- Height: 1.72 m (5 ft 7 1/2 in)
- Weight: 60 kg (132 lb)

Sport
- Country: Italy
- Sport: Athletics
- Event: 400 metres
- Club: CUS Milano

Achievements and titles
- Personal best: 400 m: 52.61 (2012)
Medal record
Mediterranean Games
Gold medal – first place	2013 Mersin	4×400 m relay

Elena Maria Bonfanti (born 9 July 1988 in Milan) is an Italian sprinter.

== Biography ==
She competed in the 4 × 400 m relay event at the 2012 Summer Olympics.

== National records ==
- 4x400 metres relay indoor: 3:31.99 ( (Poland) Sopot, 8 March 2014) - with Maria Enrica Spacca, Marta Milani, Chiara Bazzoni

== Achievements ==
Year	Competition	Venue	Position	Event	Time	Notes
Representing Italy
2009	European U23 Championships	(Lithuania) Kaunas	14th (sf)	400m	54.80	
2009	European U23 Championships	(Lithuania) Kaunas	5th	4 × 400 m relay	3:32.92	
2012	Olympic Games	(United Kingdom) London	Heat	4 × 400 m relay	3:29.01	
2013	Mediterranean Games	(Turkey) Mersin	1st	4 × 400 m relay	3.32.44	

== See also ==
- Italy at the 2012 Summer Olympics
