= Kseniya Aksyonova =

Russian sprinter

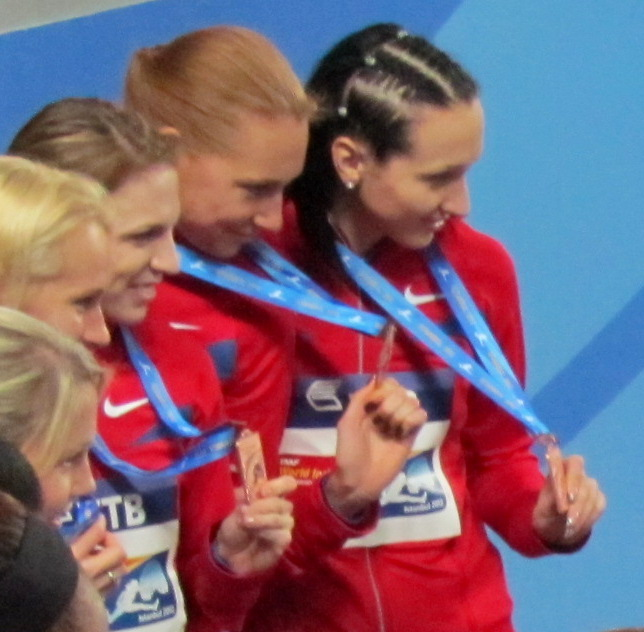
Kseniya Aksyonova (third from right) in 2012

Kseniya Aleksandrovna Aksyonova, (née Ustalova), (Russian: Ксения Александровна Аксенова; born 14 January 1988 in Sverdlovsk) is a Russian track and field sprinter who specialises in the 400 metres.

She has won gold medals in the 4 × 400 metres relay with Russia in European competition in the junior (2007), under-23 (2009) and senior (2010) levels. She won the silver medal in the individual 400 m at the 2010 European Athletics Championships with a personal best run of 49.92 seconds. She won the relay gold at the 2011 Summer Universiade and won her first global level medal with a relay bronze at the 2012 IAAF World Indoor Championships.

Ustalova began 2013 with an indoor best 51.31 seconds to win the Russian indoor title.

== International competitions ==
Representing Russia
Year	Competition	Venue	Position	Event	Notes
2007	European Junior Championships	Hengelo, Netherlands	2nd	400 m	52.92
2007	European Junior Championships	Hengelo, Netherlands	1st	4 × 400 m relay	3:33.95
2009	European U23 Championships	Kaunas, Lithuania	1st	400 m	51.74
2009	European U23 Championships	Kaunas, Lithuania	1st	4 × 400 m relay	3:27.59
2010	European Team Championships	Bergen, Norway	1st	400 m	51.79
2010	European Team Championships	Bergen, Norway	1st	4 × 400 m relay	3:23.76
2010	European Championships	Barcelona, Spain	2nd	400 m	49.92
2010	European Championships	Barcelona, Spain	1st	4 × 400 m relay	3:26.89
2011	Universiade	Shenzhen, China	1st	4 × 400 m relay	3:27.16
2012	World Indoor Championships	Istanbul, Turkey	DSQ (3rd)	4 × 400 m relay	3:29.55
2013	European Indoor Championships	Gothenburg, Sweden	5th (h)	400 m	52.23
2013	Universiade	Kazan, Russia	1st	400 m	50.60
2013	Universiade	Kazan, Russia	1st	4 × 400 m relay	3:26.61
2015	World Championships	Beijing, China	4th	4 × 400 m relay	3:24.84
Competing as Authorised Neutral Athlete
2018	European Championships	Berlin, Germany	27th (h)	400 m	53.37
2019	World Championships	Doha, Qatar	26th (h)	400 m	51.99
