= Ksenia Zadorina =

Russian sprinter

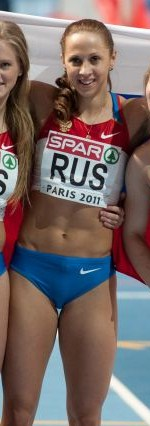
Zadorina at the 2011 European Indoor Championships.

Ksenia Ivanovna Zadorina (Russian: Ксения Ивановна Задорина; born March 2, 1987) is a Russian sprinter.

== International competitions ==
Representing Russia
Year	Competition	Venue	Position	Event	Notes
2005	European Junior Championships	Kaunas, Lithuania	2nd	400 m	53.39
2006	World Junior Championships	Beijing, China	4th	400m	51.99
2006	World Junior Championships	Beijing, China	5th	4 × 400 m relay	3:33.21
2007	European U23 Championships	Debrecen, Hungary	3rd	400m	51.78
2007	European U23 Championships	Debrecen, Hungary	1st	4 × 400 m relay	3:26.58
2007	Universiade	Bangkok, Thailand	3rd	400 m	51.89
2007	Universiade	Bangkok, Thailand	2nd	4 × 400 m relay	3:30.49
2009	European U23 Championships	Kaunas, Lithuania	2nd	400 m	51.76
2009	European U23 Championships	Kaunas, Lithuania	1st	4 × 400 m relay	3:27.59
2010	European Team Championships	Bergen, Norway	1st	4 × 400 m relay	3:23.76
2010	European Championships	Barcelona, Spain	1st (h)	4 × 400 m relay	3:26.89
2011	European Indoor Championships	Paris, France	3rd	400 m	52.03
2011	European Indoor Championships	Paris, France	1st	4 × 400 m relay	3:29.34
2011	World Championships	Daegu, South Korea	1st (h)	4 × 400 m relay	3:20.94
2012	European Championships	Helsinki, Finland	2nd	400 m	51.26
2012	European Championships	Helsinki, Finland	6th	4 × 400 m relay	3:28.36
2013	European Indoor Championships	Gothenburg, Sweden	2nd	4 × 400 m relay	3:28.18
2014	European Championships	Zürich, Switzerland	16th (h)	400 m	52.57
2014	European Championships	Zürich, Switzerland	2nd (h)	4 × 400 m relay	3:28.42
2015	World Championships	Beijing, China	4th	4 × 400 m relay	3:24.84
