= 2009 European Athletics U23 Championships – Women's 4 × 400 metres relay =

The women's 4 x 400 metres relay event at the 2009 European Athletics U23 Championships was held in Kaunas, Lithuania, at S. Dariaus ir S. Girėno stadionas (Darius and Girėnas Stadium) on 18 and 19 July.

== Medalists ==
Gold	Anna Sedova; Kseniya Zadorina; Kseniya Vdovina; Kseniya Ustalova; Lyudmila Mochalina^{*} Russia
Silver	Esther Cremer; Jill Richards; Janin Lindenberg; Sorina Nwachukwu; Lena Schmidt^{*} Germany
Bronze	Maryna Liboza; Katsiaryna Mishyna; Hanna Tashpulatava; Alena Kievich; Maryia Kavaliova^{*} Belarus

^{*}: Competed in heat.

== Results ==
=== Final ===
19 July

Rank	Nation	Competitors	Time	Notes
1st place, gold medalist(s)	Russia	Anna Sedova; Kseniya Zadorina; Kseniya Vdovina; Kseniya Ustalova	3:27.59	
2nd place, silver medalist(s)	Germany	Esther Cremer; Jill Richards; Janin Lindenberg; Sorina Nwachukwu	3:29.21	
3rd place, bronze medalist(s)	Belarus	Maryna Liboza; Katsiaryna Mishyna; Hanna Tashpulatava; Alena Kievich	3:30.45	
4	Ukraine	Anna Yaroshchuk; Nataliya Lupu; Yuliya Olishevska; Hanna Titimets	3:30.78	
5	Italy	Eleonora Sirtoli; Elena Bonfanti; Chiara Varisco; Marta Milani	3:32.92	
6	Poland	Agata Bednarek; Agnieszka Leszczyńska; Iga Baumgart; Tina Polak	3:33.49	
7	France	Joellie Baflan; Bérénice Manimba; Anaïs Desroses; Marie-Angélique Lacordelle	3:38.06	
8	Romania	Paula Băduleț; Mihaela Nunu; Florina Rusu; Anamaria Ioniță	3:38.43	

=== Heats ===
18 July
Qualified: first 3 in each heat 2 best to the Final

==== Heat 1 ====
Rank	Nation	Competitors	Time	Notes
1	Russia	Anna Sedova; Lyudmila Mochalina; Kseniya Vdovina; Kseniya Zadorina	3:30.48	Q
2	Belarus	Maryia Kavaliova; Maryna Liboza; Hanna Tashpulatava; Katsiaryna Mishyna	3:34.21	Q
3	Germany	Esther Cremer; Jill Richards; Lena Schmidt; Janin Lindenberg	3:34.58	Q
4	Poland	Agata Bednarek; Iga Baumgart; Katarzyna Janecka; Tina Polak	3:35.83	q
5	France	Joellie Baflan; Bérénice Manimba; Anaïs Desroses; Marie-Angélique Lacordelle	3:36.94	q

==== Heat 2 ====
Rank	Nation	Competitors	Time	Notes
1	Italy	Eleonora Sirtoli; Elena Bonfanti; Chiara Varisco; Marta Milani	3:38.18	Q
2	Ukraine	Anna Yaroshchuk; Yuliya Olishevska; Olha Yekymenko; Hanna Titimets	3:38.57	Q
3	Romania	Paula Băduleț; Mihaela Nunu; Florina Rusu; Anamaria Ioniță	3:39.11	Q
4	Lithuania	Eglė Staišiūnaitė; Eglė Balčiūnaitė; Rita Balciuskaitė; Agnė Orlauskaitė	3:40.69	
5	Finland	Noora Toivo; Annimari Korte; Anniina Laitinen; Karin Storbacka	3:50.39	

== Participation ==
According to an unofficial count, 45 athletes from 10 countries participated in the event.

- Belarus (5)
- Finland (4)
- France (4)
- Germany (5)
- Italy (4)
- Lithuania (4)
- Poland (5)
- Romania (4)
- Russia (5)
- Ukraine (5)
