= 2009 European Athletics U23 Championships – Women's 400 metres =

The women's 400 metres event at the 2009 European Athletics U23 Championships was held in Kaunas, Lithuania, at S. Dariaus ir S. Girėno stadionas (Darius and Girėnas Stadium) on 16 and 17 July.

== Medalists ==
Gold	Kseniya Ustalova; Russia
Silver	Kseniya Zadorina; Russia
Bronze	Anna Sedova; Russia

== Results ==
=== Final ===
17 July

Rank	Name	Nationality	Time	Notes
1st place, gold medalist(s)	Kseniya Ustalova	Russia	51.74	
2nd place, silver medalist(s)	Kseniya Zadorina	Russia	51.76	
3rd place, bronze medalist(s)	Anna Sedova	Russia	52.58	
4	Sorina Nwachukwu	Germany	52.59	
5	Agnė Orlauskaitė	Lithuania	52.81	
6	Marta Milani	Italy	52.94	
7	Yuliya Olishevska	Ukraine	53.43	
8	Katsiaryna Mishyna	Belarus	53.56	

=== Semifinals ===
16 July
Qualified: first 3 in each heat and 2 best to the Final

==== Semifinal 1 ====
Rank	Name	Nationality	Time	Notes
1	Sorina Nwachukwu	Germany	52.70	Q
2	Kseniya Zadorina	Russia	52.76	Q
3	Katsiaryna Mishyna	Belarus	53.05	Q
4	Yuliya Olishevska	Ukraine	53.42	q
5	Maris Mägi	Estonia	53.85	
6	Marie-Angélique Lacordelle	France	54.04	
7	Bianka Varga	Hungary	54.32	
8	Eleonora Sirtoli	Italy	55.92	

==== Semifinal 2 ====
Rank	Name	Nationality	Time	Notes
1	Kseniya Ustalova	Russia	52.59	Q
2	Anna Sedova	Russia	52.68	Q
3	Marta Milani	Italy	52.72	Q
4	Agnė Orlauskaitė	Lithuania	52.98	q
5	Agata Bednarek	Poland	54.04	
6	Aauri Lorena Bokesa	Spain	54.25	
7	Elena Bonfanti	Italy	54.80	
8	Florina Rusu	Romania	55.68	

=== Heats ===
16 July
Qualified: first 3 in each heat and 4 best to the Semifinals

==== Heat 1 ====
Rank	Name	Nationality	Time	Notes
1	Agnė Orlauskaitė	Lithuania	53.55	Q
2	Kseniya Ustalova	Russia	53.65	Q
3	Aauri Lorena Bokesa	Spain	54.34	Q
4	Elena Bonfanti	Italy	54.46	q
5	Bérénice Manimba	France	55.41	
6	Mihaela Nunu	Romania	57.75	

==== Heat 2 ====
Rank	Name	Nationality	Time	Notes
1	Kseniya Zadorina	Russia	53.02	Q
2	Katsiaryna Mishyna	Belarus	53.43	Q
3	Maris Mägi	Estonia	53.49	Q
4	Bianka Varga	Hungary	53.64	q
5	Agata Bednarek	Poland	54.22	q
6	Vera Barbosa	Portugal	54.84	
7	Anniina Laitinen	Finland	57.65	

==== Heat 3 ====
Rank	Name	Nationality	Time	Notes
1	Sorina Nwachukwu	Germany	53.81	Q
2	Yuliya Olishevska	Ukraine	54.18	Q
3	Eleonora Sirtoli	Italy	54.36	Q
4	Marie-Angélique Lacordelle	France	54.67	q
5	Iga Baumgart	Poland	54.97	
6	Militsa Georgieva	Bulgaria	56.28	

==== Heat 4 ====
Rank	Name	Nationality	Time	Notes
1	Anna Sedova	Russia	53.43	Q
2	Marta Milani	Italy	53.62	Q
3	Florina Rusu	Romania	54.00	Q
4	Josefin Magnusson	Sweden	55.22	
5	Anaïs Desroses	France	55.41	
6	Natalia Romero	Spain	55.94	

== Participation ==
According to an unofficial count, 25 athletes from 16 countries participated in the event.

- Belarus (1)
- Bulgaria (1)
- Estonia (1)
- Finland (1)
- France (3)
- Germany (1)
- Hungary (1)
- Italy (3)
- Lithuania (1)
- Poland (2)
- Portugal (1)
- Romania (2)
- Russia (3)
- Spain (2)
- Sweden (1)
- Ukraine (1)
