= Jitka Bartoničková =

Czech sprinter (born 1985)

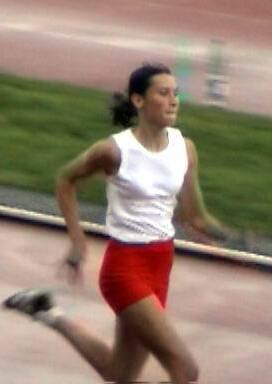
- Bartoničková

Personal information
- Born: 22 December 1985 (age 40) Benešov, Czechoslovakia
- Height: 1.75 m (5 ft 9 in)
- Weight: 56 kg (123 lb)

Sport
- Country: Czech Republic
- Sport: Athletics
- Event: 4 × 400m Relay
Medal record
World Indoor Championships
Silver medal – second place	2010 Doha	4 × 400 m relay
European Indoors Championships
Bronze medal – third place	2013 Gothenburg	4 × 400 m relay

Jitka Bartoničková (Czech pronunciation: [ˈjɪtka ˈbartoɲɪtʃkovaː]; born 22 December 1985) is a Czech former sprinter.

== Personal record ==
Event	Time (sec)	Venue	Date
60 metres	7.75	Prague, Czech Republic	21 February 2006
100 metres	12.12	Pardubice, Czech Republic	3 August 2006
150 metres	17.88	Prague, Czech Republic	9 May 2006
200 metres	24.05	Kladno, Czech Republic	5 July 2009
300 metres	37.95	Prague, Czech Republic	9 May 2006
400 metres	52.72	Vyškov, Czech Republic	17 June 2012
400 metres indoor	53.52	Vienna, Austria	8 February 2014

== Competition record ==
Year	Competition	Venue	Position	Event	Notes
Representing the Czech Republic
2004	World Junior Championships	Grosseto, Italy	9th (h)	4 × 400 m relay	3:37.89
2006	European Championships	Gothenburg, Sweden	19th	400 m	52.91 PB
2007	European U23 Championships	Debrecen, Hungary	13th (h)	400m	54.04
2007	European U23 Championships	Debrecen, Hungary	7th	4 × 100 m relay	45.18
2010	World Indoor Championships	Doha, Qatar	2nd	4 × 400 m	3:30.05
2010	European Championships	Barcelona, Spain	17th	400 m	54.16
2011	World Championships	Daegu, South Korea	7th	4 × 400 m relay	3:26.57
