= 2006 World Junior Championships in Athletics – Women's 4 × 400 metres relay =

The women's 4x400 metres relay event at the 2006 World Junior Championships in Athletics was held in Beijing, China, at Chaoyang Sports Centre on 19 and 20 August.

== Medalists ==
Gold	Jessica Beard; Brandi Cross; Sa'de Williams; Nicole Leach; United States
Silver	Shade Abugan; Ajoke Odumusu; Joy Eze; Sekinat Adesanya; Nigeria
Bronze	Latoya McDermott; Sherene Pinnock; Sonita Sutherland; Kaliese Spencer; Jamaica

== Results ==
=== Final ===
20 August

Rank	Nation	Competitors	Time	Notes
1st place, gold medalist(s)	United States	Jessica Beard; Brandi Cross; Sa'de Williams; Nicole Leach	3:29.01	
2nd place, silver medalist(s)	Nigeria	Shade Abugan; Ajoke Odumusu; Joy Eze; Sekinat Adesanya	3:30.84	
3rd place, bronze medalist(s)	Jamaica	Latoya McDermott; Sherene Pinnock; Sonita Sutherland; Kaliese Spencer	3:31.62	
4	China	Chen Yumei; Wang Hui; Wen Xiuyun; Li Xueji	3:32.59	
5	Russia	Nadezhda Sozontova; Anastasiya Ott; Polina Fominykh; Ksenia Zadorina	3:33.21	
6	Germany	Désirée Meyer; Sorina Nwachikukwa; Carolin Walter; Janin Lindenberg	3:36.49	
7	Ukraine	Anna Plotitsyna; Anzhelika Shevchenko; Natalya Lupu; Olga Mihailchenko	3:36.97	
8	Poland	Katarzyna Szuba; Agnieszka Sowinska; Edyta Madejewska; Tina Polak	3:47.13	

=== Heats ===
19 August

==== Heat 1 ====
Rank	Nation	Competitors	Time	Notes
1	Nigeria	Shade Abugan; Ajoke Odumusu; Joy Eze; Sekinat Adesanya	3:33.00	Q
2	Jamaica	Sherene Pinnock; Kaliese Spencer; Shana-Gaye Tracey; Sonita Sutherland	3:33.26	Q
3	Poland	Sandra Mazan; Agnieszka Sowinska; Edyta Madejewska; Tina Polak	3:40.93	Q
4	Canada	Carline Muir; Jennifer Biewald; Corri-Ann Campbell-Fell; Sarah Wells	3:41.25	
5	Romania	Taisia Crestincov; Elena Batrinu; Anamaria Ioniță; Andreea Patrasc	3:44.45	
6	Belarus	Maryna Boika; Hanna Tashpulatava; Volha Lozhechnik; Maryna Kavaliova	3:44.70	
7	India	Sini Jose; Anu Mariam Jose; Priyanka Pawar; Machettira Poovamma	3:45.42	

==== Heat 2 ====
Rank	Nation	Competitors	Time	Notes
1	United States	Sa'de Williams; Jessica Young; Erin Humphrey; Brandi Cross	3:34.83	Q
2	China	Chen Yumei; Wang Hui; Wen Xiuyun; Li Xueji	3:35.16	Q
3	Russia	Nadezhda Sozontova; Anna Verkhovskaya; Luiza Biktina; Polina Fominykh	3:37.76	Q
4	Germany	Lena Schmidt; Janin Lindenberg; Carolin Walter; Sorina Nwachikukwa	3:37.82	q
5	Ukraine	Anna Plotitsyna; Anzhelika Shevchenko; Olga Mihailchenko; Natalya Lupu	3:38.20	q
6	France	Marie-Angélique Lacordelle; Amélie Auge; Cyndie Sabattini; Laetitia Denis	3:39.28	
7	Australia	Angeline Blackburn; Suzie Knight; Lauren Boden; Jacqueline Davies	3:40.90	

== Participation ==
According to an unofficial count, 63 athletes from 14 countries participated in the event.

- Australia (4)
- Belarus (4)
- Canada (4)
- China (4)
- France (4)
- Germany (5)
- India (4)
- Jamaica (5)
- Nigeria (4)
- Poland (5)
- Romania (4)
- Russia (6)
- Ukraine (4)
- United States (6)
