= Janin Lindenberg =

German sprinter

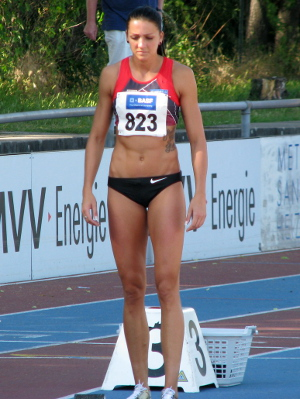
- Lindenberg in 2012

Personal information
- Full name: Janin Lindenberg
- Born: 20 January 1987 (age 39) Berlin, Germany
- Height: 1.75 m (5 ft 9 in)

Sport
- Country: Germany
- Sport: Athletics
- Event: 400 metres

Achievements and titles
- Personal best(s): 400 metres: 51.97 (Regensburg; June 2011)

Janin Lindenberg (born 20 January 1987) is a German athlete who specialises in the 400 metres. She was born in Berlin. Lindenberg represented Germany in the 4 × 400 metres at the 2012 Summer Olympics.

== Achievements ==
Year	Competition	Venue	Position	Event	Notes
Representing Germany
2006	World Junior Championships	Beijing, China	16th (sf)	400 m	54.06
2006	World Junior Championships	Beijing, China	6th	4 × 400 m relay	3:36.49
2009	European U23 Championships	Kaunas, Lithuania	2nd	4 × 400 m relay	3:29.21
2010	European Team Championships	Bergen, Norway	2nd	4 × 400 m relay	3:26.96
2010	European Championships	Barcelona, Spain	1st	4 × 400 m relay	3:24.07
2011	European Indoor Championships	Paris, France	5th	400 m	52.62
