= Sonita Sutherland =

Jamaican 400 metres runner (born 1987)

Medal record

Women's athletics

Representing Jamaica

World Junior Championships
Silver medal – second place	2004 Grosseto	400 m
Silver medal – second place	2006 Beijing	400 m
Bronze medal – third place	2004 Grosseto	4x400 m relay
Bronze medal – third place	2006 Beijing	4x400 m relay

Sonita Sutherland (born 9 July 1987 in Manchester) is a Jamaican 400 metres runner.

Her personal best is 51.13 seconds, achieved in April 2006.

== International competitions ==
Year	Competition	Venue	Position	Event	Notes
Representing Jamaica
2002	CARIFTA Games (U17)	Nassau, The Bahamas	1st	4x400 m relay	3:44.18 CR
2002	CARIFTA Games (U17)	Nassau, The Bahamas	2nd	400 m	56.01
2003	CARIFTA Games (U17)	Port of Spain, Trinidad and Tobago	1st	4x400 m relay	3:39.50 CR
2003	CARIFTA Games (U17)	Port of Spain, Trinidad and Tobago	2nd	400 m	53.90
2003	World Youth Championships	Sherbrooke, Canada	7th	400 m	54.50
2003	World Youth Championships	Sherbrooke, Canada	2nd	800m Medley relay	2:07.05
2003	Pan American Junior Championships	Bridgetown, Barbados	3rd	400m	53.56
2003	Pan American Junior Championships	Bridgetown, Barbados	2nd	4 × 400 m relay	3:41.26
2004	CARIFTA Games (U20)	Hamilton, Bermuda	1st	4 × 400 m relay	53.11
2004	CARIFTA Games (U20)	Hamilton, Bermuda	1st	4 × 400 m relay	3:40.12
2004	World Junior Championships	Grosseto, Italy	2nd	400 m	52.41
2004	World Junior Championships	Grosseto, Italy	3rd	4 × 400 m relay	3:30.37
2005	CARIFTA Games (U20)	Bacolet, Trinidad and Tobago	1st	400 m	54.22
2005	CARIFTA Games (U20)	Bacolet, Trinidad and Tobago	1st	4 × 400 m relay	3:36.91
2005	Central American and Caribbean Championships	Nassau, The Bahamas	1st	4 × 400 m relay	3:30.63
2005	Pan American Junior Championships	Windsor, Ontario, Canada	3rd	400m	52.68
2005	Pan American Junior Championships	Windsor, Ontario, Canada	2nd	4 × 400 m relay	3:36.99
2006	CARIFTA Games (U-20)	Les Abymes, Guadeloupe	1st	400 m	51.30 CR
2006	CARIFTA Games (U-20)	Les Abymes, Guadeloupe	1st	4 × 400 m relay	3:31.90 CR
2006	Central American and Caribbean Junior Championships (U-20)	Port of Spain, Trinidad and Tobago	1st	400 m	51.57 CR
2006	Central American and Caribbean Junior Championships (U-20)	Port of Spain, Trinidad and Tobago	1st	4 × 400 m relay	3:36.02
2006	World Junior Championships	Beijing, China	2nd	400 m	51.42
2006	World Junior Championships	Beijing, China	3rd	4 × 400 m relay	3:31.62
2008	Central American and Caribbean Championships	Cali, Colombia	7th	400m	52.79 A
2009	Central American and Caribbean Championships	Havana, Cuba	2nd	4 × 400 m relay	3:34.02
