= 2011 European Athletics Indoor Championships – Women's 400 metres =

The Women's 400 metres event at the 2011 European Athletics Indoor Championships was held at March 4 & 5 with the final being held on March 5 at 17:30 local time.

== Records ==
Standing records prior to the 2011 European Athletics Indoor Championships
World record	Jarmila Kratochvílová (TCH)	49.59	Milan, Italy	7 March 1982
European record	Jarmila Kratochvílová (TCH)	49.59	Milan, Italy	7 March 1982
Championship record	Jarmila Kratochvílová (TCH)	49.59	Milan, Italy	7 March 1982
World Leading	Natasha Hastings (USA)	50.83	Albuquerque, United States	27 February 2011
European Leading	Olesya Krasnomovets (RUS)	51.22	Moscow, Russia	17 February 2011

== Results ==
=== Heats ===
First 3 in each heat and 3 best performers advanced to the Semifinals.

The heats were held at 10:20.

Rank	Heats	Name	Nationality	React	Time	Notes
1	1	Vania Stambolova	Bulgaria	0.303	53.05	Q
2	1	Janin Lindenberg	Germany	0.268	53.43	Q
3	1	Nataliya Lupu	Ukraine		53.72	Q
4	2	Olesya Krasnomovets	Russia	0.292	53.75	Q
5	3	Kseniya Zadorina	Russia	0.194	54.25	Q
6	2	Hanna Tashpulatava	Belarus		54.26	Q
7	3	Denisa Rosolová	Czech Republic	0.254	54.41	Q
8	3	Marta Milani	Italy	0.185	54.48	Q
9	2	Hanna Titimets	Ukraine	0.191	54.49	Q
10	1	Meliz Redif	Turkey	0.267	54.63	q
DQ	2	Pınar Saka	Turkey		~~54.87~~	q, Doping
11	1	Patricia Lopes	Portugal		54.94	q
12	2	Marian Heffernan	Ireland	0.236	54.94	
13	3	Darya Prystupa	Ukraine	0.242	54.96	
14	1	Amaliya Sharoyan	Armenia	0.235	56.08	
15	3	Bianca Răzor	Romania	0.305	55.08	
16	3	Anita Banović	Croatia	0.253	55.20	
	2	Jasna Horozić	Bosnia and Herzegovina	0.343	DQ	R 163.3

=== Semifinal ===
First 3 in each heat advanced to the Final.

The semifinals were held at 17:55.

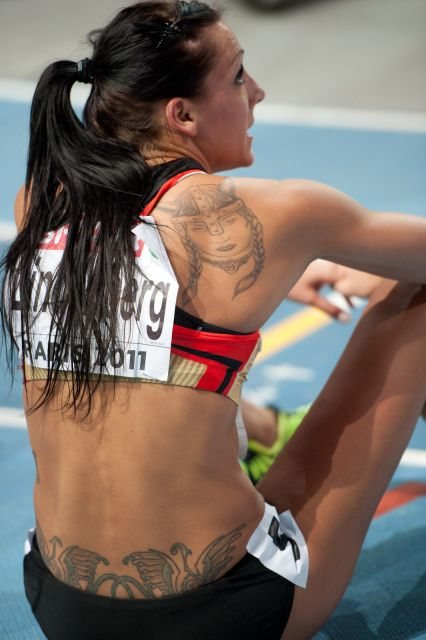
Fifth place finisher, Janin Lindenberg.

Rank	Heat	Name	Nationality	React	Time	Notes
1	2	Olesya Krasnomovets	Russia	0.358	52.53	Q
2	2	Denisa Rosolová	Czech Republic	0.201	52.81	Q
3	1	Kseniya Zadorina	Russia	0.215	52.88	Q
4	2	Vania Stambolova	Bulgaria	0.301	52.89	Q
5	1	Janin Lindenberg	Germany	0.248	53.12	Q
6	1	Marta Milani	Italy	0.207	53.44	Q
7	1	Hanna Tashpulatava	Belarus		53.69	
8	1	Hanna Titimets	Ukraine	0.197	53.97	
9	2	Nataliya Lupu	Ukraine	0.262	54.24	
10	2	Meliz Redif	Turkey	0.283	54.58	
11	2	Patricia Lopes	Portugal		55.09	
DQ	1	Pınar Saka	Turkey		~~55.40~~	Doping

=== Final ===
The final was held at 17:30.

Rank	Lane	Name	Nationality	React	Time	Notes
1st place, gold medalist(s)	4	Denisa Rosolová	Czech Republic	0.210	51.73	PB
2nd place, silver medalist(s)	5	Olesya Krasnomovets	Russia	0.301	51.80	
3rd place, bronze medalist(s)	6	Kseniya Zadorina	Russia	0.241	52.03	
4	1	Vania Stambolova	Bulgaria	0.324	52.58	
5	3	Janin Lindenberg	Germany	0.240	52.62	
6	2	Marta Milani	Italy	0.234	53.23	
