= Marie-Angélique Lacordelle =

French sprinter

Medal record

Athletics

Representing French Guiana

CARIFTA Games Junior (U20)
Bronze medal – third place	2005 Bacolet, Tobago	400 m
Bronze medal – third place	2006 Les Abymes	400 m

Marie-Angélique Lacordelle (born 19 January 1987) is a French sprinter who specialized in the 400 metres.

She was born in Cayenne, French Guiana. She reached the semi-final in her individual event at the 2006 World Junior Championships, and in the 4 x 400 metres relay she competed at the 2007 World Championships without reaching the final.

Her personal best times are 23.94 seconds in the 200 metres, achieved in July 2006 in Mannheim; and 52.59 seconds in the 400 metres, achieved in August 2007 in Niort.

== Achievements ==
Year	Competition	Venue	Position	Event	Notes
Representing / French Guiana
2005	CARIFTA Games (U-20)	Bacolet, Trinidad and Tobago	3rd (h)	200 m	24.77 (-1.6 m/s)
2005	CARIFTA Games (U-20)	Bacolet, Trinidad and Tobago	3rd	400 m	55.20
2006	CARIFTA Games (U-20)	Les Abymes, Guadeloupe	6th	200 m	24.13 (-0.8 m/s)
2006	CARIFTA Games (U-20)	Les Abymes, Guadeloupe	3rd	400 m	54.22
Representing France
2006	World Junior Championships	Beijing, China	14th (sf)	400m	53.82
2006	World Junior Championships	Beijing, China	8th (h)	4 × 400 m relay	3:39.28
2007	European U23 Championships	Debrecen, Hungary	9th (h)	400m	53.69
2007	European U23 Championships	Debrecen, Hungary	2nd	4 × 400 m relay	3:30.56
2009	European U23 Championships	Kaunas, Lithuania	10th (sf)	400m	54.04
2009	European U23 Championships	Kaunas, Lithuania	7th	4 × 400 m relay	3:38.06
