= 2010 IAAF World Indoor Championships – Women's 4 × 400 metres relay =

The women's 4 × 400 metres relay at the 2010 IAAF World Indoor Championships was held at the Aspire Dome on 14 March.

The Jamaican team came third and was awarded the bronze medals, but was later disqualified after Bobby-Gaye Wilkins was found to have been doping. A sample of hers collected at the championships was found positive for andarine.

== Medalists ==
Gold	Silver	Bronze
Debbie Dunn; DeeDee Trotter; Natasha Hastings; Allyson Felix; United States	Denisa Rosolová; Jitka Bartoničková; Zuzana Bergrová; Zuzana Hejnová; Czech Republic	Kim Wall; Vicki Barr; Perri Shakes-Drayton; Lee McConnell; Great Britain

== Records ==
Standing records prior to the 2010 IAAF World Indoor Championships
World record	Russia (RUS)	3:23.37	Glasgow, Great Britain	28 January 2006
Championship record	Russia (RUS)	3:23.88	Budapest, Hungary	7 March 2004
World Leading	University of Arkansas	3:33.18	New York City, United States	6 February 2010
Asian record	India (IND)	3:37.46	Doha, Qatar	16 February 2008
European record	Russia (RUS)	3:23.37	Glasgow, Great Britain	28 January 2006
North and Central American and Caribbean record	United States (USA)	3:27.59	Maebashi, Japan	7 March 1999
Oceanian Record	Australia (AUS)	3:26.87	Maebashi, Japan	7 March 1999

== Schedule ==
Date	Time	Round
14 March 2010	17:45	Final

== Results ==
=== Final ===
Rank	Nation	Athletes	Time	Notes
1st place, gold medalist(s)	United States	Debbie Dunn, DeeDee Trotter, Natasha Hastings, Allyson Felix	3:27.34	WL
2nd place, silver medalist(s)	Czech Republic	Denisa Rosolová, Jitka Bartoničková, Zuzana Bergrová, Zuzana Hejnová	3:30.05	SB
3rd place, bronze medalist(s)	Great Britain	Kim Wall, Vicki Barr, Perri Shakes-Drayton, Lee McConnell	3:30.29	SB
DQ	Russia	Svetlana Pospelova, Natalya Nazarova, Kseniya Vdovina, Tatyana Firova	~~3:27.44~~	Doping
DQ	Jamaica	Bobby-Gaye Wilkins, Clora Williams, Davita Prendergast, Novlene Williams-Mills	~~3:28.49~~	Doping
