= Sekinat Adesanya =

Nigerian sprinter

Sekinat Adesanya Akinpelu (born 25 July 1987) is a Nigerian sprinter who specializes in the 400 metres.

Her personal best time is 52.48 seconds, achieved during the 2006 World Junior Championships.

== Achievements ==
Year	Competition	Venue	Position	Event	Notes
Representing Nigeria
2006	World Junior Championships	Beijing, China	6th	400 m	52.71
2006	World Junior Championships	Beijing, China	2nd	4 × 400 m relay	3:30.84 AJR
2007	All-Africa Games	Algiers, Algeria	1st	4 × 400 m relay	3:29.74
