= 2007 European Athletics U23 Championships =

6th European Athletics U23 Championships
- Dates: 12–15 July 2007
- Host city: Debrecen, Hungary
- Venue: Gyulai István Atlétikai Stadion
- Level: U23
- Type: Outdoor
- Events: 44
- Participation: 748 athletes from 41 nations

The 6th European Athletics U23 Championships were held between 12 and 15 July 2007 in the Gyulai István Athletic Stadium in Debrecen, Hungary.

== Results ==
Complete results and medal winners were published.

=== Men ===
Event	Gold		Silver		Bronze	
100 metres	Simeon Williamson; Great Britain	10.10	Craig Pickering; Great Britain	10.14	Martial Mbandjock; France	10.27
200 metres	Visa Hongisto; Finland	20.84	Vojtech Šulc; Czech Republic	20.91	Rikki Fifton; Great Britain	21.02
400 metres	Denis Alekseyev; Russia	45.69	Željko Vincek; Croatia	45.69	Kacper Kozłowski; Poland	45.86
800 metres	Marcin Lewandowski; Poland	1:49.94	Oleksandr Osmolovych; Ukraine	1:50.21	Abdesslam Merabet; France	1:50.31
1500 metres	Álvaro Rodriguez; Spain	3:44.00	Yohan Durand; France	3:44.38	Barnabás Bene; Hungary	3:44.47
5000 metres	Noureddine Smaïl; France	13:53.15	Andrey Safronov; Russia	13:54.04	Kemal Koyuncu; Turkey	13:54.32
10,000 metres	Anatoliy Rybakov; Russia	29:09.89	Michel Butter; Netherlands	29:12.95	Daniele Meucci; Italy	29:18.26
110 metres hurdles	Konstadinos Douvalidis; Greece	13.49	Adrien Deghelt; Belgium	13.59	Emanuele Abate; Italy	13.66
400 metres hurdles	Dai Greene; Great Britain	49.58	Fadil Bellaabouss; France	49.58	Milan Kotur; Croatia	50.14
3000 metres steeplechase	Mahiedine Mekhissi; France	8:33.91	Ildar Minshin; Russia	8:34.27	Balázs Ott; Hungary	8:35.04
20 kilometres walk	Valeriy Borchin; Russia	1:20:43	Andrey Krivov; Russia	1:21:51	Sergey Bakulin; Russia	1:23:33
4 × 100 metres relay	Great Britain; Ryan Scott; Craig Pickering; Rikki Fifton; James Ellington	38.95	Portugal; Dany Gonçalves; Arnaldo Abrantes; Ricardo Martins; Yazaldes Nascimento	39.37	Finland; Hannu Hämäläinen; Visa Hongisto; Rami Jokinen; Jonathan Åstrand	39.53
4 × 400 metres relay	Russia; Maksim Dyldin; Denis Alekseyev; Artem Sergeyenkov; Anton Kokorin	3:02.13	Poland; Grzegorz Klimczyk; Patryk Baranowski; Piotr Dąbrowski; Kacper Kozłowski	3:04.76	Germany; Jonas Plass; Florian Schwalm; Matthias Bos; Martin Grothkopp	3:05.25
High jump	Linus Thörnblad; Sweden	2.24 m	Benjamin Lauckner; Germany	2.21 m	Jussi Viita; Finland	2.21 m
Pole vault	Pavel Prokopenko; Russia	5.75 m	Jesper Fritz; Sweden	5.70 m	Denys Fedas; Ukraine	5.65 m
Long jump	Michał Rosiak; Poland	7.94 m	Petteri Lax; Finland	7.89 m	Roman Novotný; Czech Republic	7.87 m
Triple jump	Gary White; Great Britain	16.33 m	Adrian Świderski; Poland	16.29 m	Yuriy Zhuravlyev; Russia	16.22 m
Shot put	Jakub Giża; Poland	19.87 m	Luka Rujevic; Serbia	19.55 m	Aleksandr Grekov; Russia	19.13 m
Discus throw	Martin Wierig; Germany	61.10 m	Jan Marcell; Czech Republic	58.48 m	Apostolos Parellis; Cyprus	58.16 m
Hammer throw	Yury Shayunou; Belarus	74.92 m	Kristóf Németh; Hungary	72.56 m	Marcel Lomnicky; Slovakia	72.17 m
Javelin throw	Alexander Vieweg; Germany	79.56 m	Karlis Alainis; Latvia	76.83 m	Oleksandr Pyatnytsya; Ukraine	76.28 m
Decathlon	Andrei Krauchanka; Belarus	8,492 pts	Pascal Behrenbruch; Germany	8,239 pts	Arkadiy Vasilyev; Russia	8,179 pts

=== Women ===
Event	Gold		Silver		Bronze	
100 metres	Verena Sailer; Germany	11.66	Montell Douglas; Great Britain	11.66	Myriam Soumaré; France	11.68
200 metres	Yuliya Chermoshanskaya; Russia	23.19	Nelly Banco; France	23.36	Marta Jeschke; Poland	23.42
400 metres	Lyudmila Litvinova; Russia	51.25	Olga Shulikova; Russia	51.57	Kseniya Zadorina; Russia	51.78
800 metres	Mariya Shapayeva; Russia	2:00.86	Élodie Guégan; France	2:01.26	Vanja Perisic; Croatia	2:01.34
1500 metres	Abby Westley; Great Britain	4:15.48	Lizi Brathwaite; Great Britain	4:16.45	Tatyana Beltyukova; Russia	4:16.49
5000 metres	Laura Kenney; Great Britain	16:22.28	Volha Minina; Belarus	16:27.31	Marta Romo; Spain	16:29.56
10,000 metres	Volha Minina; Belarus	33:06.37	Irina Sergeyeva; Russia	33:08.69	Alina Alekseyeva; Russia	33:09.63
100 metres hurdles	Nevin Yanit; Turkey	12.90	Christina Vukicevic; Norway	13.08	Jessica Ennis; Great Britain	13.09
400 metres hurdles	Angela Moroșanu; Romania	54.50	Irina Obedina; Russia	55.19	Zuzana Hejnova; Czech Republic	55.93
3000 metres steeplechase	Katarzyna Kowalska; Poland	9:39.40	Ancuta Bobocel; Romania	9:41.84	Sara Moreira; Portugal	9:42.47
20 kilometres walk	Tatyana Shemyakina; Russia	1:28:48	Svetlana Solovyova; Russia	1:33:58	Olga Mikhaylova; Russia	1:34:41
4 × 100 metres relay	Russia; Yuna Mekhti-Zade; Kseniya Vdovina; Natalya Murinovich; Yuliya Chermoshanskaya	43.67	Germany; Anne-Kathrin Elbe; Verena Sailer; Mareike Peters; Anne Möllinger	43.75	Poland; Paulina Siemieniako; Ewelina Klocek; Marta Jeschke; Iwona Brzezińska	43.78
4 × 400 metres relay	Russia; Olga Shulikova; Ksenia Zadorina; Yelena Novikova; Lyudmila Litvinova	3:26.58	France; Marie-Angélique Lacordelle; Symphora Béhi; Virginie Michanol; Thélia Sigère	3:30.56	Ukraine; Hanna Platitsyna; Kseniya Karandyuk; Yuliya Irhina; Oleksandra Peycheva	3:33.90
High jump	Svetlana Shkolina; Russia	1.92 m	Adonía Steryiou; Greece	1.92 m	Ebba Jungmark; Sweden	1.89 m
Pole vault	Aleksandra Kiryashova; Russia	4.50 m	Anna Schultze; Germany	4.35 m	Anna Battke; Germany	4.35 m
Long jump	Anna Nazarova; Russia	6.81 m	Denisa Ščerbová; Czech Republic	6.80 m	Yelena Sokolova; Russia	6.71 m
Triple jump	Liliya Kulyk; Ukraine	14.39 m	Yekaterina Kayukova; Russia	14.11 m	Anastasiya Taranova; Russia	13.99 m
Shot put	Irina Tarasova; Russia	18.26 m	Denise Hinrichs; Germany	17.56 m	Anna Avdeyeva; Russia	17.47 m
Discus throw^{†}	Kateryna Karsak; Ukraine	64.40 m	Veronika Watzek; Austria	57.15 m	Svetlana Saykina; Russia	56.92 m
Hammer throw	Maryia Smaliachkova; Belarus	69.34 m	Lenka Ledvinova; Czech Republic	67.63 m	Nataliya Zolotukhina; Ukraine	67.00 m
Javelin throw	Linda Stahl; Germany	62.17 m	Annika Suthe; Germany	57.86 m	Madara Palameika; Latvia	57.07 m
Heptathlon	Viktorija Zemaityte; Lithuania	6,219 pts	Jolanda Keizer; Netherlands	6,219 pts	Julia Mächtig; Germany	6,151 pts

^{†}: In discus throw, Darya Pishchalnikova from Russia ranked initially 2nd (64.15m), but was disqualified for infringement of IAAF doping rules.

== Medal table ==
Rank	Nation	Gold	Silver	Bronze	Total
1	Russia (RUS)	15	8	11	34
2	Great Britain (GBR)	6	3	2	11
3	Germany (GER)	4	6	3	13
4	Poland (POL)	4	2	3	9
5	Belarus (BLR)	4	1	0	5
6	France (FRA)	2	5	3	10
7	Ukraine (UKR)	2	1	5	8
8	Finland (FIN)	1	1	2	4
9	Sweden (SWE)	1	1	1	3
10	Greece (GRE)	1	1	0	2
10	Romania (ROM)	1	1	0	2
12	Spain (ESP)	1	0	1	2
12	Turkey (TUR)	1	0	1	2
14	Lithuania (LTU)	1	0	0	1
15	Czech Republic (CZE)	0	4	2	6
16	Netherlands (NED)	0	2	0	2
17	Croatia (CRO)	0	1	2	3
17	Hungary (HUN)	0	1	2	3
19	Latvia (LAT)	0	1	1	2
19	Portugal (POR)	0	1	1	2
21	Austria (AUT)	0	1	0	1
21	Belgium (BEL)	0	1	0	1
21	Norway (NOR)	0	1	0	1
21	Serbia (SRB)	0	1	0	1
25	Italy (ITA)	0	0	2	2
26	Cyprus (CYP)	0	0	1	1
26	Slovakia (SVK)	0	0	1	1
Totals (27 entries)		44	44	44	132

== Participation ==
According to an unofficial count, 851 athletes from 44 countries participated in the event.

- Armenia (1)
- Austria (4)
- Azerbaijan (1)
- Belarus (23)
- Belgium (13)
- Bosnia and Herzegovina (1)
- Bulgaria (9)
- Croatia (8)
- Cyprus (10)
- Czech Republic (27)
- Denmark (8)
- Estonia (11)
- Finland (24)
- France (65)
- Germany (60)
- Great Britain (46)
- Greece (25)
- Hungary (39)
- Iceland (3)
- Ireland (6)
- Israel (14)
- Italy (44)
- Latvia (14)
- Lithuania (23)
- Luxembourg (2)
- Macedonia (1)
- Malta (1)
- Moldova (6)
- Montenegro (1)
- Netherlands (18)
- Norway (17)
- Poland (59)
- Portugal (19)
- Romania (21)
- Russia (72)
- San Marino (1)
- Serbia (4)
- Slovakia (8)
- Slovenia (7)
- Spain (44)
- Sweden (28)
- Switzerland (9)
- Turkey (10)
- Ukraine (44)
