= Saburi Adesanya =

Nigerian academic

Prof. Saburi Adesanya

Vice-Chancellor of Olabisi Onabanjo University
- Appointed by: Ibikunle Amosun

Personal details
- Born: Saburi Adesanya Adejimi
- Education: Igbobi College, Lagos; University of Ibadan; Obafemi Awolowo University
- Occupation: Academic; author

Saburi Adesanya Adejimi is a Nigerian academic, author and the 7th substantive Vice-chancellor of the Olabisi Onabanjo University. He is a professor of pharmacognosy. He was formerly the Acting Vice-Chancellor before being confirmed in 2015. He left the office in 2017 after five years of service.

== Education ==
Professor Adeyemi attended Baptist Grammar School, Ibadan between 1966 and 1970, he then proceeded to Igbobi College, Lagos from 1971 to 1972. He afterward went to the University of Ibadan in 1973 where he bagged the Bachelor of Science Degree in Biochemistry in 1976. He again went to the Obafemi Awolowo University where he bagged a Master’s degree in Philosophy in 1981. He obtained his Doctorate degree in Pharmacognosy from the University of London in 1984.
