= Sofie Persson =

Swedish soccer player (born 1992)

Personal information
- Full name: Sofie Persson
- Date of birth: 13 July 1992 (age 34)
- Place of birth: Sweden
- Position: Striker

Senior career*
Years	Team	Apps	(Gls)
2012	Lindsdals IF	20	(2)
2013	IFK Kalmar	12	(2)
2015–2016	Brisbane Roar	8	(0)
- * Club domestic league appearances and goals as of 12 October 2016

Sofie Persson (born 13 July 1992) is a Swedish soccer player, who plays for Eastern Suburbs FC in the Football Queensland NPL Women's competition. She last played professionally for Brisbane Roar in the Australian W-League. She previously played for Lindsdals IF and IFK Kalmar in Sweden.

== Playing career ==
=== Club ===
==== Sunshine Coast Fire, 2014–2015 ====
Coming to Australia in 2014, Persson began playing for Sunshine Coast Fire in the Queensland NPLW competition. Proving herself a prolific striker, she would go on to score 26 goals across the course of the season. On the back of her performances, Persson would be invited to train with W-League side Brisbane Roar in mid 2015.

==== Brisbane Roar, 2015–2016 ====
Persson signed a professional contract with Brisbane Roar for the 2015–16 W-League season and helped the team finish in fourth place during the regular season securing a berth to the playoffs. During the semifinal match against regular season champions Melbourne City, Brisbane was defeated 5–4 in a penalty kick shootout after 120 minutes of regular and overtime produced no goals for either side.

==== UQFC, 2017 ====
Persson returned to the NPLW Queensland competition in 2017, signing with UQFC, however would miss the majority of the season after suffering an ACL tear.

==== Souths FC, 2018 ====
After completing her injury rehabilitation, Persson once again returned to the NPLW Queensland with Souths United. She would tally 7 goals over 22 matches, with the team finishing fourth on the competition ladder.

==== Lions FC, 2019 ====
Persson signed with NPLW Queensland side Lions FC, based in Richlands, for the 2019 season and helped the team to both minor and major premierships, totalling 19 goals over 25 appearances and scoring a season high 5 goals against Mitchelton.

==== Mitchelton FC, 2020 ====
It was announced that Persson would move to Mitchelton FC for the 2020 NPLW Queensland season. She netted 12 goals over the course of the year, with her side finishing the season in eighth overall.

==== The Gap FC, 2021 ====
Persson moved to The Gap FC for the 2021 season. However, she would play only 13 games for the club before completing a mid-season transfer to rival NPLW outfit Eastern Suburbs FC. Persson was selected in the 2021 NPL All-Stars Women's Squad at the conclusion of the season.

==== Eastern Suburbs FC, 2021 - Present ====
Persson would recommit to Eastern Suburbs FC for the 2022 season. The team went on to have a relatively successful season, falling in the semi-finals to Gold Coast United FC.

As team captain, Persson would lead her side to victory in the 2023 NPLW Queensland Grand Final, defeating Gold Coast United FC 1-0 through a 5th minute goal from Emma Starr.
