= Gyulai István Athletic Stadium =

Stadium in Debrecen, Hungary

Coordinates: 47.5526°N 21.6372°E

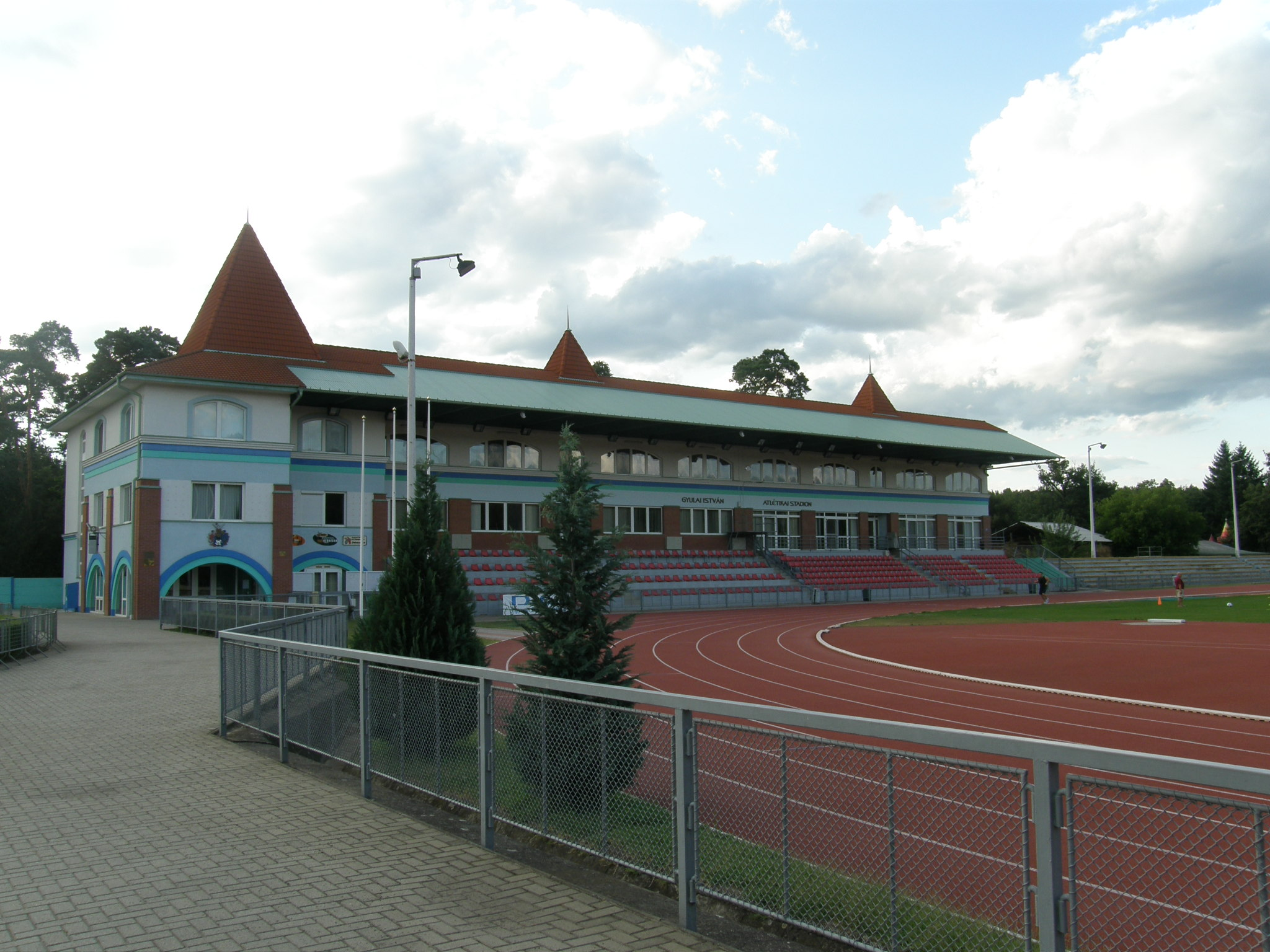
Gyulai István Athletic Stadium

The István Gyulai Atlétikai Stadium is a multi-purpose stadium facility in the city of Debrecen, Hungary, which is part of the Debreceni Sportcentrum sports complex.

== Background ==
The stadium is named after István Gyulai, who died in 2006, and served as secretary of the IAAF, in addition to dealing with the commentary of sporting events.

The stadium hosted the 2001 World Youth Championships in Athletics and the 2007 European Athletics U23 Championships.
