= Denisa Helceletová =

Czech athlete

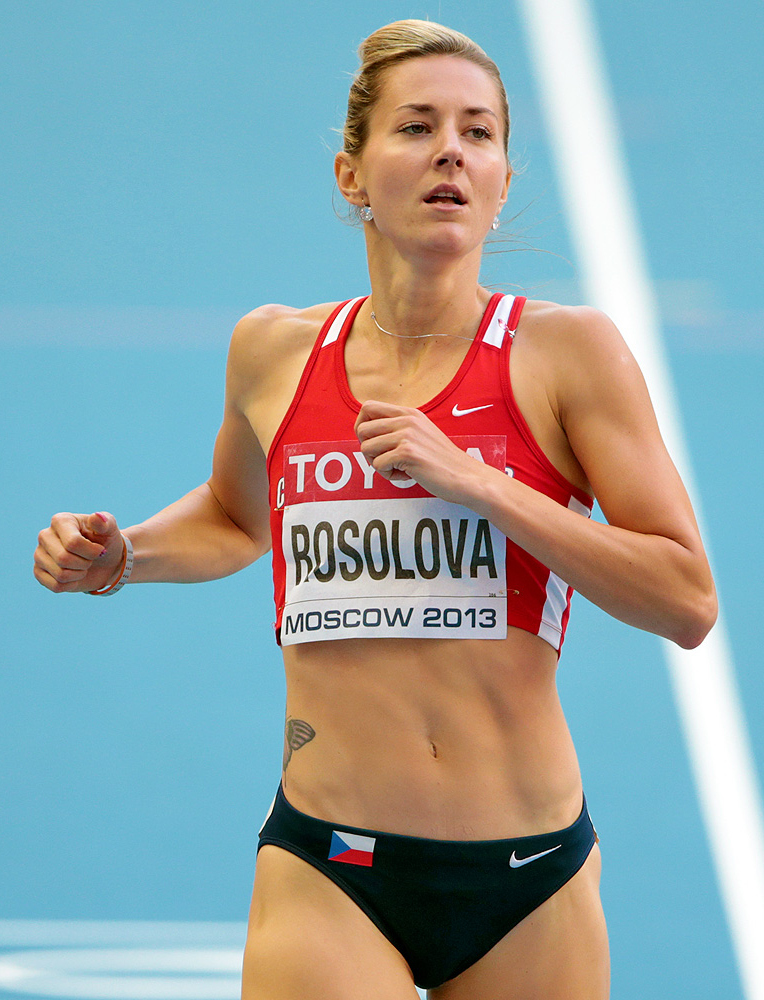
- Denisa Rosolová at 2013 World Championships in Athletics

Personal information
- Born: Denisa Ščerbová; 21 August 1986 (age 39) Karviná, Czechoslovakia
- Height: 1.75 m (5 ft 9 in)
- Weight: 61 kg (134 lb)

Sport
- Country: Czech Republic
- Sport: Athletics
- Event(s): Long jump 400 m hurdles 400 metres Heptathlon; 4 × 400 m Relay
Medal record
Representing Czech Republic
Women's athletics
World Indoor Championships
Silver medal – second place	2010 Doha	4 × 400 m relay
European Championships
Gold medal – first place	2012 Helsinki	400 m hurdles
Bronze medal – third place	2014 Zürich	400 m hurdles
Bronze medal – third place	2012 Helsinki	4 × 400 m relay
European Indoor Championships
Gold medal – first place	2011 Paris	400 m
Bronze medal – third place	2007 Birmingham	Long jump
Bronze medal – third place	2013 Gothenburg	4 × 400 m relay
World Junior Championships
Gold medal – first place	2004 Grosseto	Long jump
World U17 Championships
Silver medal – second place	2003 Sherbrooke	Long jump

Denisa Helceletová, formerly Rosolová, née Ščerbová (Czech pronunciation: [ˈdɛnɪsa ˈrosolovaː ˈʃtʃɛrbovaː]) (born 21 August 1986 in Karviná, Czechoslovakia) is a Czech former athlete who has won medals at the European Championships and European Indoor Championships.

== Biography ==
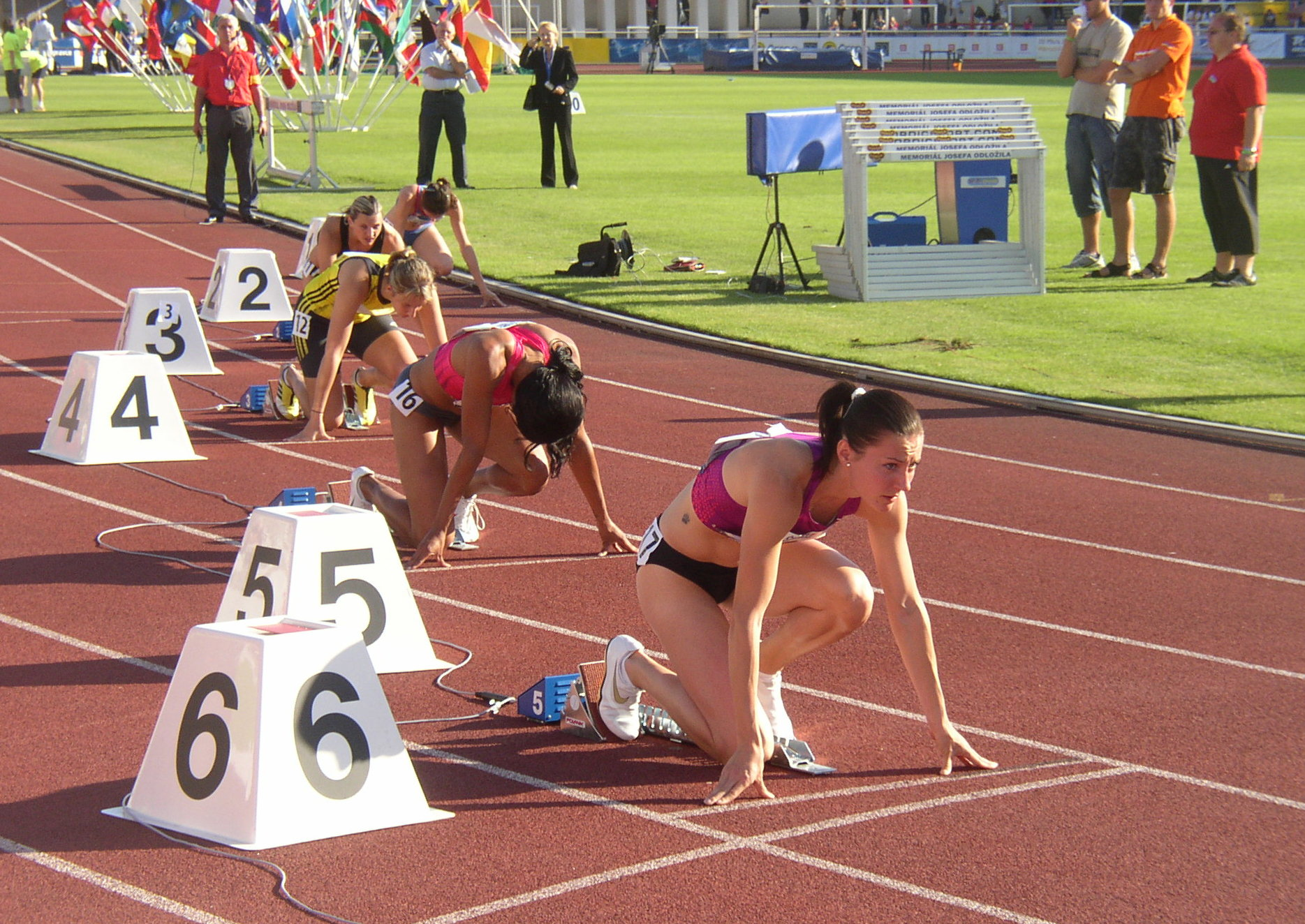
Denisa Rosolová (track 5) in starting blocks at the 2010 Josef Odložil Memorial.

Rosolová's main event is the long jump, but she also competes in heptathlon. Her best are 6.68 m in the long jump (July 2004 in Grosseto) and 5,828 points in the heptathlon (July 2006 in Tábor). Since 2001, she has been a member of AK SSK Vítkovice, an athletic club in Ostrava; her coach is Aleš Duda.

Rosolová took the silver medal in the long jump at the 2003 U17 World Championships in Sherbrooke and won the gold medal in the long jump at the 2004 World Junior Championships in Grosseto. She came 25th in the long jump at the 2004 Summer Olympics in Athens. She also competed in the heptathlon at the 2006 European Championships in Gothenburg but had to pull out because of an ankle injury.

At the 2007 European Indoor Championships in Birmingham, Rosolová matched her Czech indoor long jump record of 6.64 m and came in third, beating Bianca Kappler by one centimetre and winning her first major senior medal. As of March 2007, she was several-time champion of the Czech Republic (one outdoor and three indoor titles in the long jump and one title in the heptathlon). In February 2008 she improved her own indoor national record in pentathlon to 4632 points. In 2012, Rosolová started to compete in the 400 m hurdles and in her first season, she almost beat Zuzana Hejnová's national record.

Rosolová won a bronze medal with the Czech 4 × 400 metres relay at the 2013 European Athletics Indoor Championships.

== Personal life ==
In November 2008 she married tennis player Lukáš Rosol. In 2011, they divorced. On 7 November 2017 Rosolová announced her pregnancy and an end of her athletic career. On 15 June 2019 she married athlete Adam Helcelet. She has two daughters with Helcelet, born in May 2018 and September 2021.
