= Thélia Sigère =

French sprinter

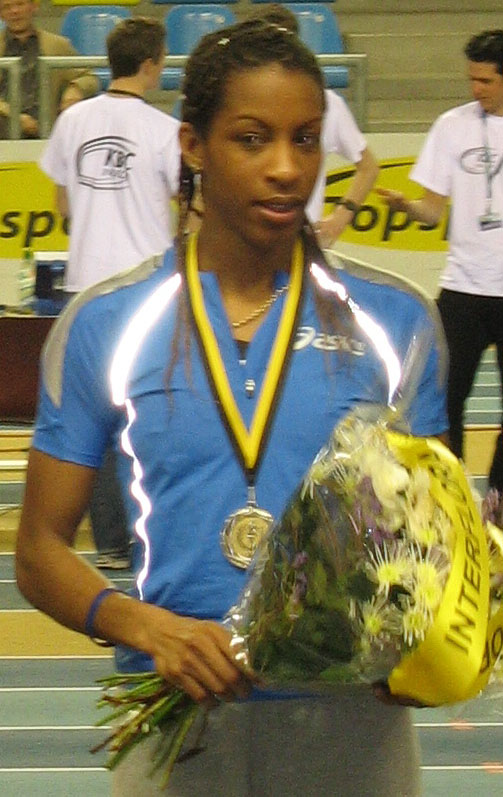

Thélia Sigère (born 3 June 1985) is a French sprinter who specializes in the 400 metres. She was born in Fort de France, Martinique.

She competed at the 2006 European Championships and the 2009 European Indoor Championships without reaching the final. In the 4 x 400 metres relay she finished sixth at the 2004 World Junior Championships and seventh at the 2006 European Championships. She also competed at the 2007 World Championships and the 2008 Olympic Games without reaching the final.

Her personal best times are 23.45 seconds in the 200 metres, achieved in May 2008 in Fort-de-France; and 52.31 seconds in the 400 metres, achieved in August 2007 in La Chaux-de-Fonds.
