= Symphora Béhi =

French sprinter

Symphora Béhi (born 22 March 1986 in Paris, France) is a French sprinter who specializes in the 400 metres.

She reached the semi-final at the 2009 European Indoor Championships. In the 4 x 400 metres relay she finished sixth at the 2004 World Junior Championships, and seventh at the 2009 World Championships.

Her personal best times are 11.74 seconds in the 100 metres, achieved in June 2004 in her birth city Paris; 23.70 seconds in the 200 metres, achieved in July 2006 in Montgeron; and 52.38 seconds in the 400 metres, achieved in June 2009 in Strasbourg.
