= 2015 World Youth Championships in Athletics – Girls' 400 metres =

Girls' 400 metres at the 2015 World Youth Championships in Athletics
- Venue: Estadio Olímpico Pascual Guerrero
- Dates: 15–17 July
- Competitors: 49 from 34 nations
- Winning time: 51.50

Medalists
| gold medal | Salwa Eid Naser | Bahrain |
| silver medal | Lynna Irby | United States |
| bronze medal | Catherine Reid | Great Britain |

The girls' 400 metres at the 2015 World Youth Championships in Athletics was held at the Estadio Olímpico Pascual Guerrero in Cali, Colombia from 15 to 17 July 2015.

== Records ==
Prior to the competition, the following records were as follows.

| World Youth Best | Li Jing (CHN) | 50.01 | Shanghai, China | 18 October 1997 |
| Championship Record | Nawal El Jack (SUD) | 51.19 | Marrakesh, Morocco | 15 July 2005 |
| World Youth Leading | Sydney McLaughlin (USA) | 52.59 | South Plainfield, United States | 30 May 2015 |

== Results ==
=== Round 1 ===
First 3 in each heat (Q) and the next 3 fastest (q) advance to the semifinals.

| Rank | Heat | Name | Nationality | Time | Note |
|---|---|---|---|---|---|
| 1 | 2 | Kyra Constantine | Canada | 53.20 | Q, PB |
| 2 | 3 | Lynna Irby | United States | 53.49 | Q |
| 3 | 5 | Salwa Eid Naser | Bahrain | 53.61 | Q |
| 4 | 6 | Roxana Gómez | Cuba | 53.65 | Q |
| 5 | 2 | Hannah Williams | Great Britain | 53.93 | Q, PB |
| 6 | 3 | Andrea Miklós | Romania | 54.29 | Q, PB |
| 7 | 1 | Symone Mason | United States | 54.41 | Q |
| 8 | 4 | Ivanna Avramchuk | Ukraine | 54.42 | Q, PB |
| 9 | 4 | Victoria Tachinski | Canada | 54.43 | Q |
| 10 | 7 | Erika Krūminaitė | Lithuania | 54.63 | Q, PB |
| 11 | 7 | Catherine Reid | Great Britain | 54.69 | Q |
| 12 | 7 | Dzhois Koba | Ukraine | 54.89 | Q |
| 13 | 5 | Natalia Kaczmarek | Poland | 55.12 | Q |
| 14 | 4 | Rebecca Borga | Italy | 55.22 | Q, PB |
| 15 | 1 | Janet Richard | Malta | 55.36 | Q |
| 16 | 2 | Alexía Polikráti | Greece | 55.38 | Q, PB |
| 17 | 4 | Avon Samuels | Guyana | 55.42 | q, PB |
| 18 | 4 | Dreshanae Rolle | Bahamas | 55.51 | q, PB |
| 19 | 1 | Rin Aoki | Japan | 55.72 | Q |
| 20 | 5 | Dora Filipović | Croatia | 55.77 | Q, SB |
| 21 | 3 | Alessia Tirnetta | Italy | 55.84 | Q |
| 22 | 7 | Mari Drabløs | Norway | 55.84 | q, PB |
| 23 | 4 | Shereen Samson Vallabouy | Malaysia | 56.02 | |
| 24 | 6 | Meleni Rodney | Grenada | 56.05 | Q |
| 25 | 2 | Liang Nuo | China | 56.14 | |
| 26 | 6 | Purity Chepkoech | Kenya | 56.21 | Q, PB |
| 27 | 2 | Ema Chovanová | Slovakia | 56.44 | |
| 28 | 7 | Patricia Mendoza | Mexico | 56.53 | |
| 29 | 2 | Patrīcija Roshofa | Latvia | 56.62 | |
| 30 | 5 | Sofía Bencomo | Mexico | 56.71 | |
| 31 | 3 | Andrea Serrano | Spain | 56.84 | |
| 32 | 1 | Cristina Balan | Romania | 57.08 | |
| 33 | 6 | Satanya Wright | Jamaica | 57.11 | |
| 34 | 6 | D'Nia Freeman | Bahamas | 57.34 | |
| 35 | 6 | Artesha Richardson | Anguilla | 57.72 | PB |
| 36 | 5 | Tamara Polić | Serbia | 57.85 | |
| 37 | 4 | Ruth Peña | Spain | 58.62 | |
| 38 | 5 | Janiel Moore | Jamaica | 59.20 | |
| 39 | 1 | Nomatter Kapfudzaruwa | Zimbabwe | 59.40 | |
| 40 | 7 | Jarly Marín | Colombia | 59.41 | |
| 41 | 3 | Xiang Miaochan | China | 1:00.14 | |
| 42 | 3 | Rebecca Guidi | San Marino | 1:02.32 | PB |
| 43 | 1 | Kellandie Bully | Dominica | 1:02.81 | |
| – | 1 | Tania Caicedo | Ecuador | DQ | |
| – | 3 | Lilian Reyes | Dominican Republic | DQ | |
| – | 7 | Jane Njoki Theuri | Kenya | DQ | |
| – | 2 | Natricia Hooper | Guyana | DQ | |
| – | 6 | Luna Jović | Serbia | DQ | |
| – | 5 | Yamani Mudiyanselage | Sri Lanka | DNS | |

=== Semifinal ===
First 2 in each heat (Q) and the next 2 fastest (q) advance to the final.

| Rank | Heat | Name | Nationality | Time | Note |
|---|---|---|---|---|---|
| 1 | 2 | Lynna Irby | United States | 52.77 | Q, PB |
| 2 | 1 | Kyra Constantine | Canada | 52.88 | Q, PB |
| 3 | 3 | Salwa Eid Naser | Bahrain | 52.99 | Q |
| 4 | 1 | Catherine Reid | Great Britain | 53.20 | Q, PB |
| 5 | 1 | Symone Mason | United States | 53.38 | q |
| 6 | 2 | Hannah Williams | Great Britain | 53.52 | Q, PB |
| 7 | 3 | Roxana Gómez | Cuba | 53.61 | Q |
| 8 | 3 | Andrea Miklós | Romania | 53.93 | q, PB |
| 9 | 2 | Natalia Kaczmarek | Poland | 54.25 | PB |
| 10 | 3 | Dzhois Koba | Ukraine | 54.26 | PB |
| 11 | 2 | Ivanna Avramchuk | Ukraine | 54.43 | |
| 12 | 3 | Victoria Tachinski | Canada | 54.77 | |
| 13 | 1 | Janet Richard | Malta | 55.37 | |
| 14 | 1 | Erika Krūminaitė | Lithuania | 55.51 | |
| 15 | 2 | Dreshanae Rolle | Bahamas | 55.58 | |
| 16 | 2 | Alexía Polikráti | Greece | 55.68 | |
| 16 | 1 | Dora Filipović | Croatia | 55.68 | SB |
| 18 | 1 | Rin Aoki | Japan | 55.69 | |
| 19 | 2 | Alessia Tirnetta | Italy | 55.91 | |
| 20 | 1 | Mari Drabløs | Norway | 56.33 | |
| 21 | 2 | Meleni Rodney | Grenada | 56.36 | |
| 22 | 3 | Rebecca Borga | Italy | 56.56 | |
| 23 | 3 | Purity Chepkoech | Kenya | 57.87 | |
| – | 3 | Avon Samuels | Guyana | DQ | |

=== Final ===
| Rank | Name | Nationality | Time | Note |
|---|---|---|---|---|
| 1st place, gold medalist(s) | Salwa Eid Naser | Bahrain | 51.50 | WYL |
| 2nd place, silver medalist(s) | Lynna Irby | United States | 51.79 | PB |
| 3rd place, bronze medalist(s) | Catherine Reid | Great Britain | 52.25 | PB |
| 4 | Kyra Constantine | Canada | 52.44 | PB |
| 5 | Roxana Gómez | Cuba | 52.79 | PB |
| 6 | Hannah Williams | Great Britain | 53.24 | PB |
| 7 | Andrea Miklós | Romania | 53.29 | PB |
| 8 | Symone Mason | United States | 53.55 | |
