= 2016 IAAF World U20 Championships – Women's 400 metres =

The women's 400 metres event at the 2016 IAAF World U20 Championships was held at Zdzisław Krzyszkowiak Stadium on 19, 20 and 21 July.

== Medalists ==
| Gold | Tiffany James; Jamaica |
| Silver | Lynna Irby; United States |
| Bronze | Junelle Bromfield; Jamaica |

== Records ==
Standing records prior to the 2016 IAAF World U20 Championships in Athletics
| World Junior Record | Grit Breuer (GER) | 49.42 | Tokyo, Japan | 27 August 1991 |
| Championship Record | Ashley Spencer (USA) | 50.50 | Barcelona, Spain | 13 July 2012 |
| World Junior Leading | Salwa Eid Naser (BHR) | 51.63 | Stara Zagora, Bulgaria | 9 June 2016 |

== Results ==
=== Heats ===
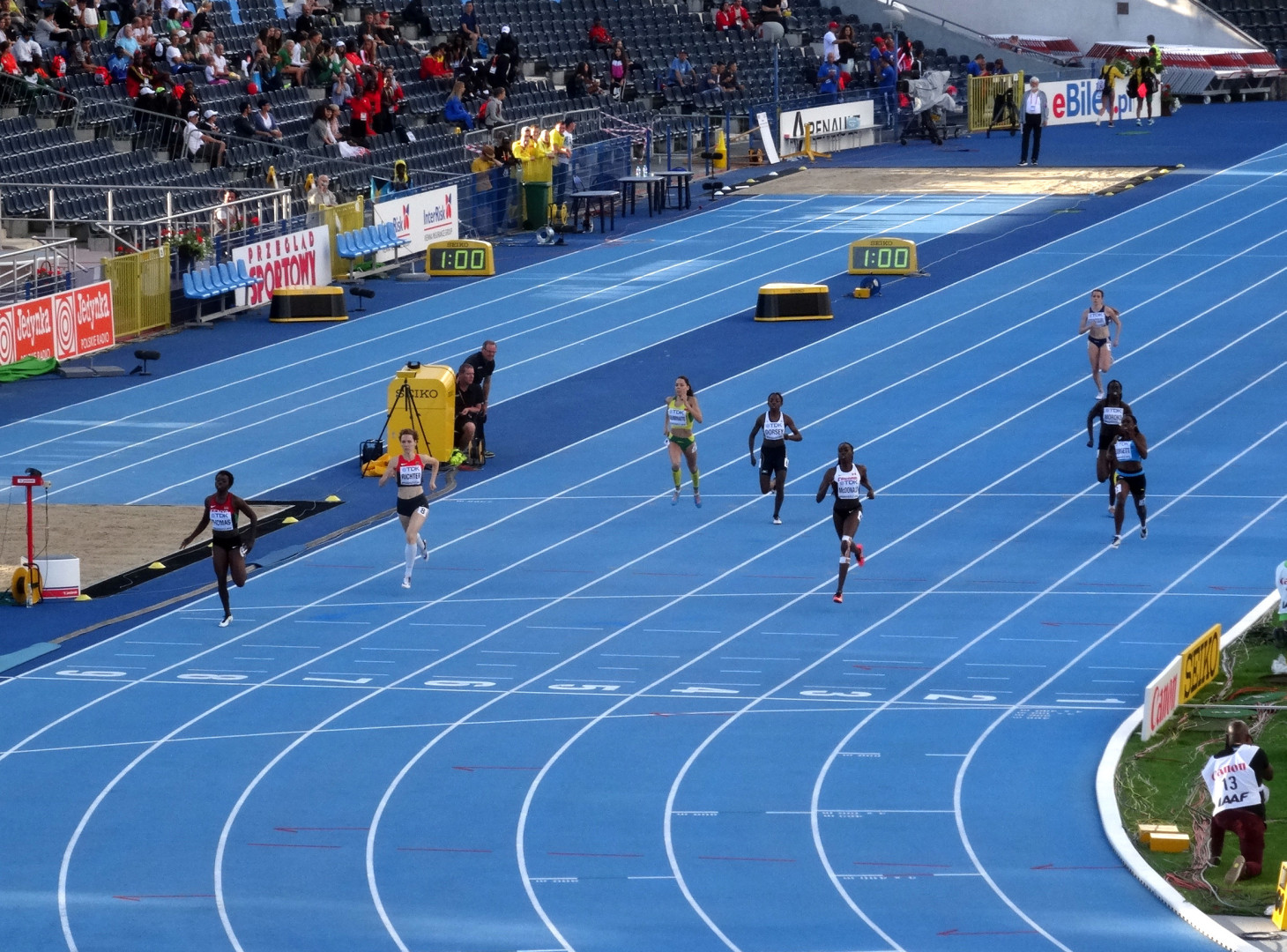
Heat 1

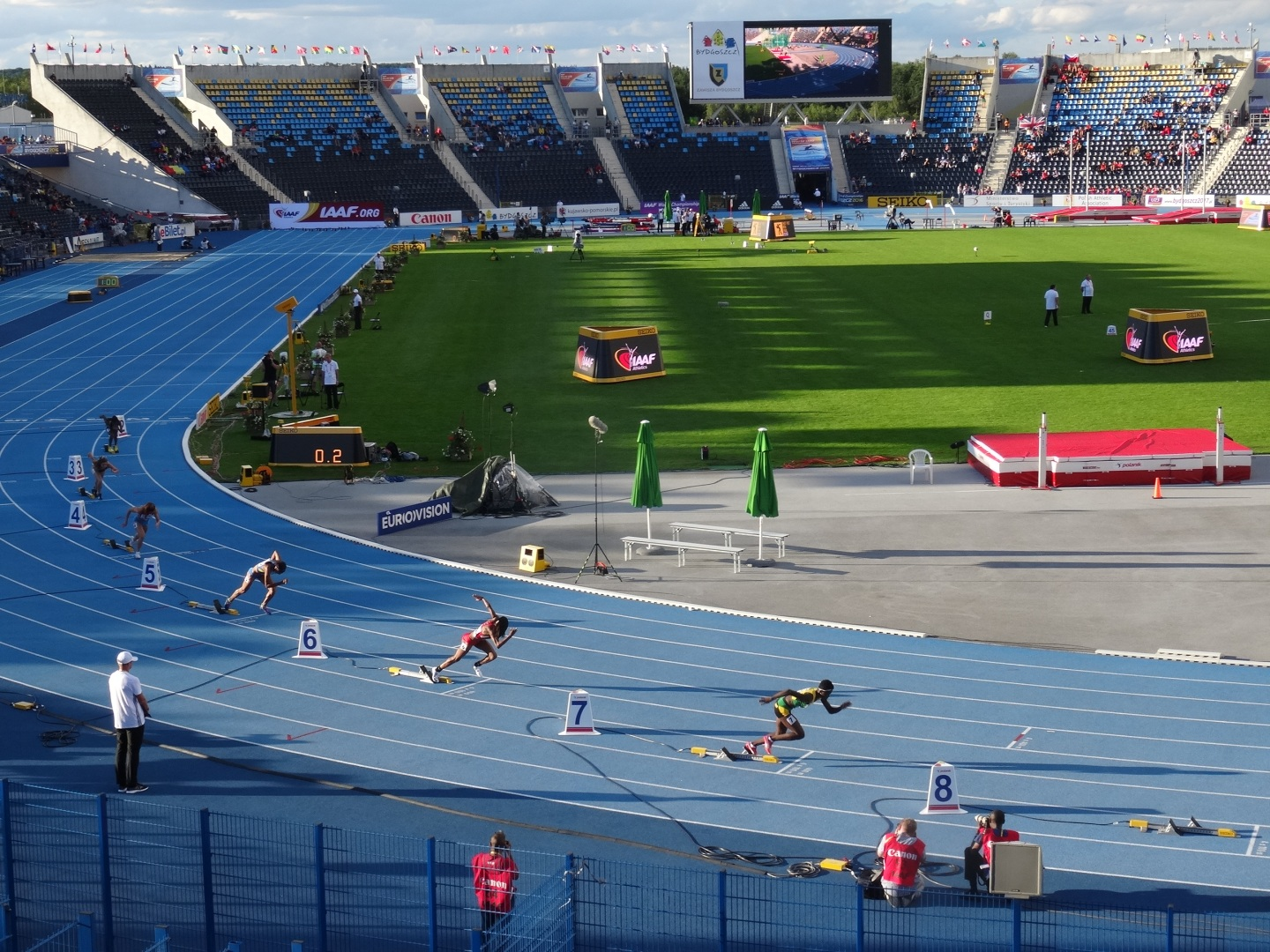
Heat 2

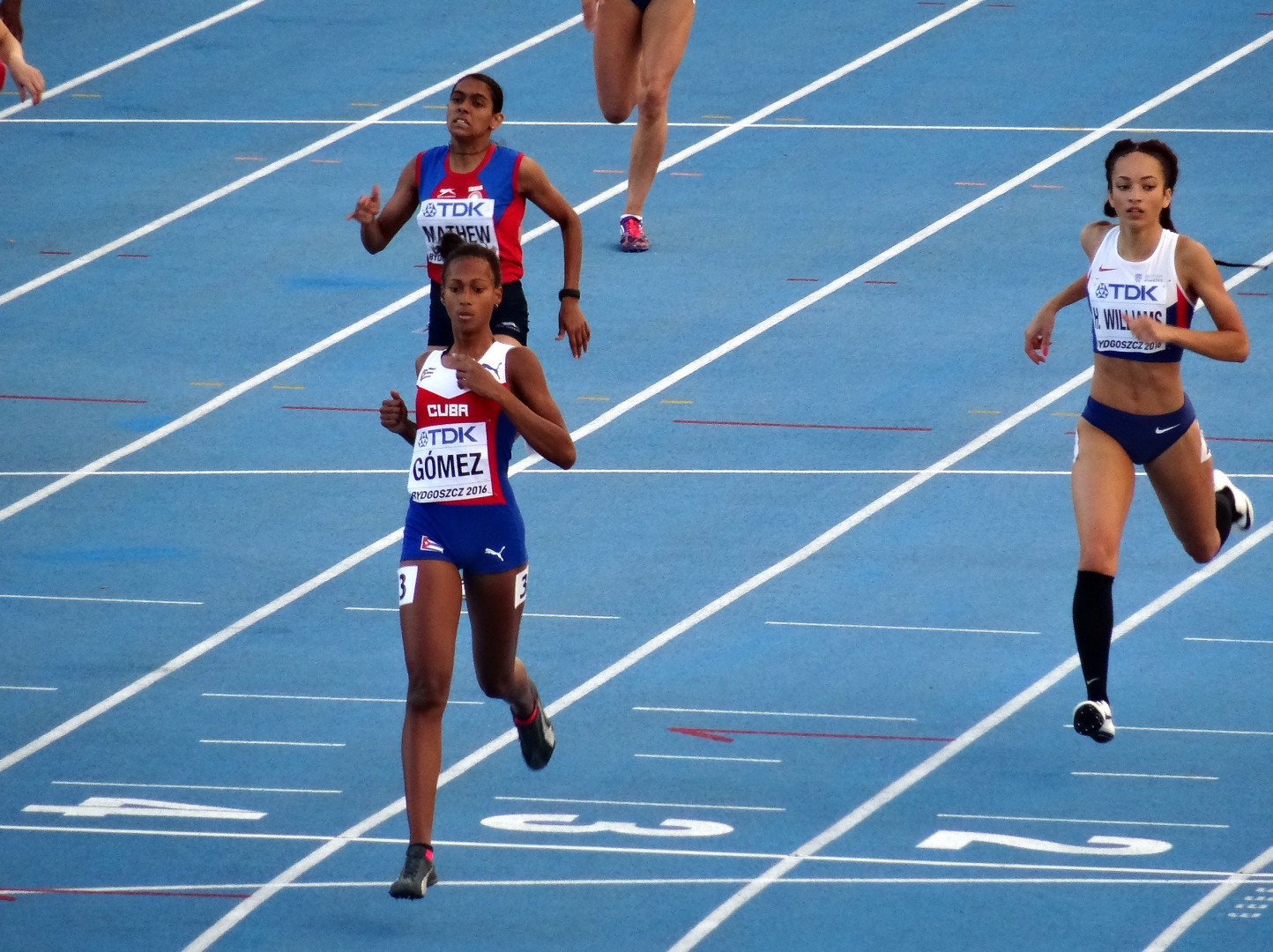
Heat 3

Qualification: First 3 of each heat (Q) and the 6 fastest times (q) qualified for the semifinals.

| Rank | Heat | Name | Nationality | Time | Note |
|---|---|---|---|---|---|
| 1 | 4 | Tiffany James | Jamaica | 52.98 | Q |
| 2 | 1 | Maureen Nyatichi Thomas | Kenya | 53.04 | Q |
| 3 | 5 | Lynna Irby | United States | 53.08 | Q |
| 4 | 3 | Roxana Gómez | Cuba | 53.16 | Q |
| 5 | 2 | Junelle Bromfield | Jamaica | 53.21 | Q |
| 6 | 1 | Natassha McDonald | Canada | 53.62 | Q, PB |
| 7 | 1 | Hendrikje Richter | Germany | 53.67 | Q |
| 8 | 5 | Jessica Thornton | Australia | 53.70 | Q |
| 9 | 2 | Dzhois Koba | Ukraine | 53.74 | Q |
| 10 | 3 | Hannah Williams | Great Britain | 53.85 | Q |
| 11 | 6 | Paola Morán | Mexico | 53.96 | Q |
| 12 | 2 | Karrington Winters | United States | 54.12 | Q |
| 13 | 6 | Zdenka Seidlová | Czech Republic | 54.13 | Q, SB |
| 14 | 6 | Rebecca Borga | Italy | 54.41 | Q |
| 15 | 5 | Ashlan Best | Canada | 54.47 | Q |
| 16 | 2 | Jeanelle Griesel | South Africa | 54.47 | q |
| 17 | 1 | Shaquania Dorsett | Bahamas | 54.55 | q |
| 18 | 6 | Vijona Kryeziu | Kosovo | 54.67 | q, SB |
| 19 | 6 | Lily Beckford | Great Britain | 54.70 | q |
| 20 | 4 | Ivanna Avramchuk | Ukraine | 54.71 | Q |
| 21 | 5 | Hannah Mergenthaler | Germany | 54.75 | q |
| 22 | 3 | Natalia Kaczmarek | Poland | 54.75 | Q |
| 23 | 1 | Erika Krūminaitė | Lithuania | 54.89 | q, SB |
| 24 | 6 | Mollie O'Reilly | Ireland | 54.92 | |
| 25 | 4 | Jenna Bromell | Ireland | 54.98 | Q |
| 26 | 3 | Chelsea Zoller | Switzerland | 55.00 | |
| 27 | 5 | Tarika Moses | British Virgin Islands | 55.04 | |
| 28 | 2 | Dora Filipović | Croatia | 55.16 | |
| 29 | 4 | Haruko Ishizuka | Japan | 55.20 | |
| 30 | 1 | Myia Dorsey | United States Virgin Islands | 55.25 | |
| 31 | 1 | Galefele Moroko | Botswana | 55.38 | |
| 32 | 6 | Molly Blakey | Australia | 55.49 | |
| 33 | 5 | Daniela Tassani | Italy | 55.62 | |
| 34 | 3 | Zinash Tesfaye | Ethiopia | 55.75 | |
| 35 | 3 | Þórdís Eva Steinsdóttir | Iceland | 56.06 | |
| 36 | 4 | Liang Nuo | China | 56.08 | |
| 37 | 4 | Eliana Chávez | Colombia | 56.96 | |
| 38 | 5 | Jane Njoki Theuri | Kenya | 57.13 | |
| 39 | 5 | María Simancas | Venezuela | 57.51 | |
| 40 | 1 | Kalliopi Kountouri | Cyprus | 59.11 | |
| | 2 | Mahilet Fikre | Ethiopia | DQ | R163.3(a) |
| | 3 | Jisna Mathew | India | DQ | R163.3(a) |
| | 2 | Shafiqua Maloney | Saint Vincent and the Grenadines | DNS | |
| | 3 | Mariette Agbety | Benin | DNS | |
| | 4 | Praise Oghenefejiro Idamadudu | Nigeria | DNS | |
| | 4 | Artesha Richardson | Anguilla | DNS | |
| | 6 | Yinka Ajayi | Nigeria | DNS | |

=== Semifinals ===
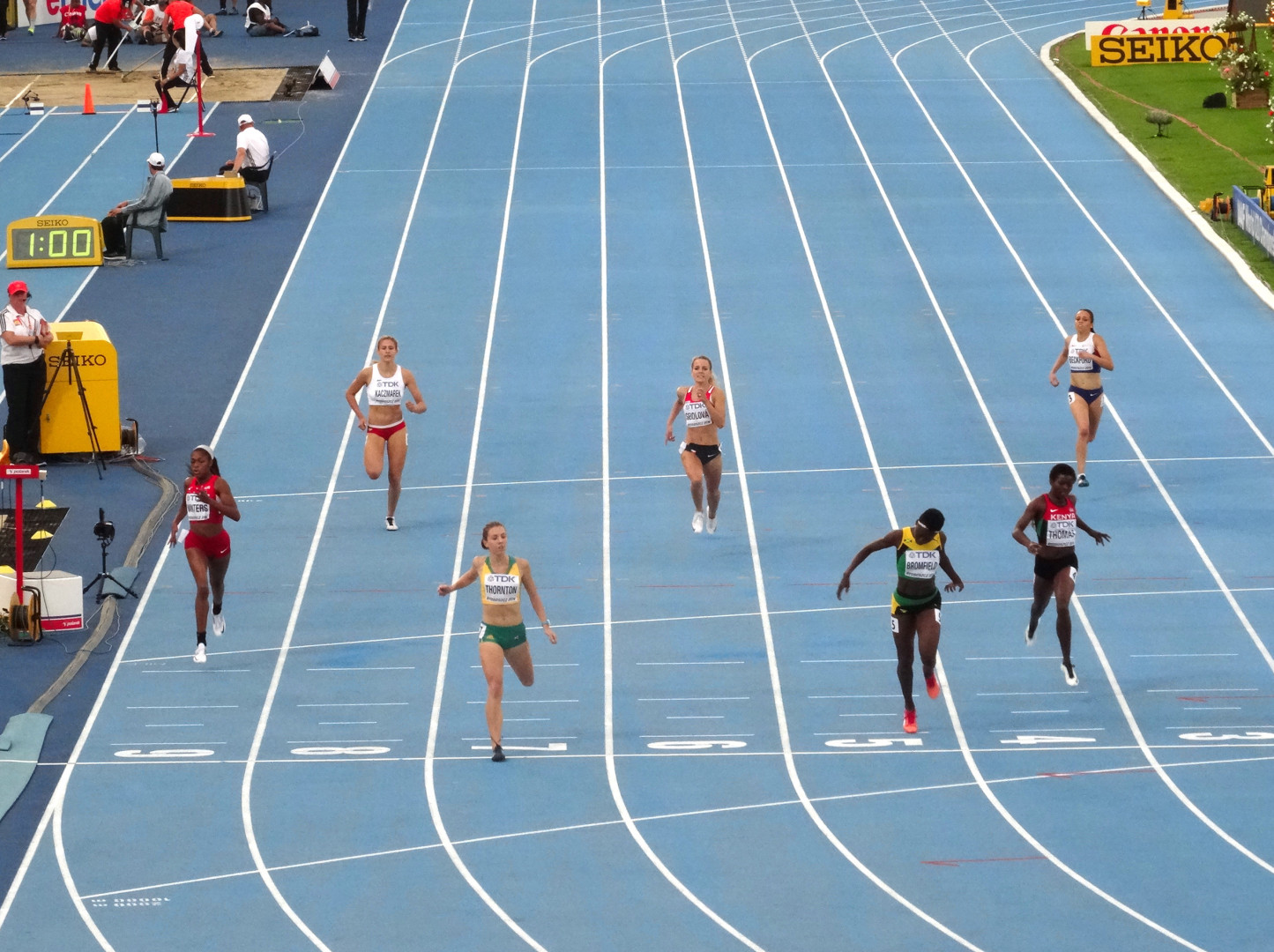
Semifinal 2

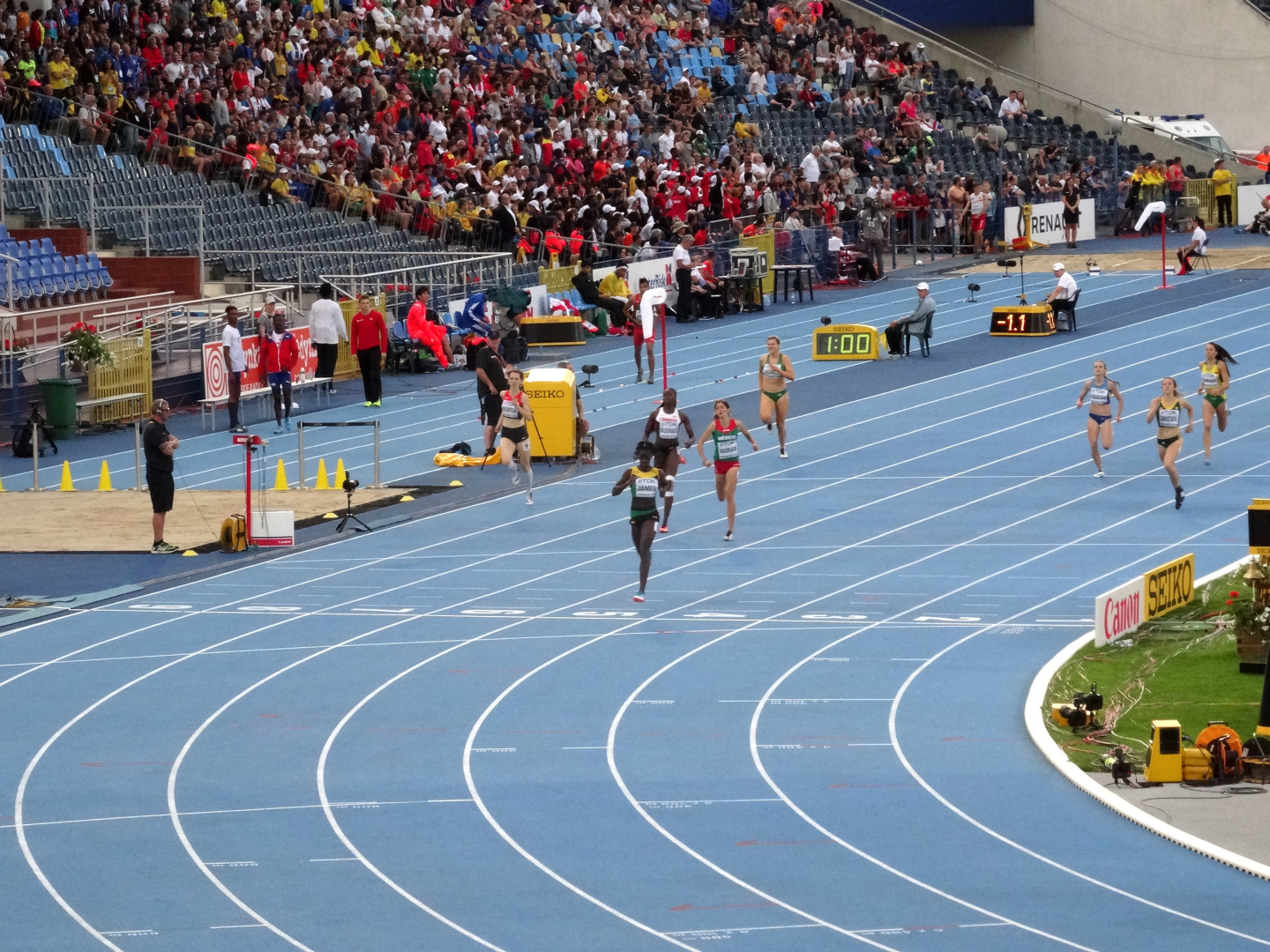
Semifinal 3

Qualification: First 2 of each heat (Q) and the 2 fastest times (q) qualified for the final.

| Rank | Heat | Name | Nationality | Time | Note |
|---|---|---|---|---|---|
| 1 | 3 | Tiffany James | Jamaica | 51.77 | Q |
| 2 | 1 | Lynna Irby | United States | 51.90 | Q, SB |
| 3 | 2 | Jessica Thornton | Australia | 52.12 | Q, PB |
| 4 | 2 | Junelle Bromfield | Jamaica | 52.18 | Q |
| 5 | 1 | Roxana Gómez | Cuba | 52.26 | Q, PB |
| 6 | 2 | Maureen Nyatichi Thomas | Kenya | 52.52 | q |
| 7 | 1 | Dzhois Koba | Ukraine | 52.79 | q, PB |
| 8 | 1 | Hannah Williams | Great Britain | 52.80 | PB |
| 9 | 2 | Karrington Winters | United States | 52.80 | PB |
| 10 | 3 | Natassha McDonald | Canada | 53.06 | Q, PB |
| 11 | 3 | Paola Morán | Mexico | 53.08 | |
| 12 | 1 | Ashlan Best | Canada | 53.27 | PB |
| 13 | 3 | Jeanelle Griesel | South Africa | 53.68 | SB |
| 14 | 3 | Hendrikje Richter | Germany | 53.85 | |
| 15 | 1 | Rebecca Borga | Italy | 53.93 | |
| 16 | 2 | Zdenka Seidlová | Czech Republic | 53.95 | PB |
| 17 | 1 | Hannah Mergenthaler | Germany | 54.13 | |
| 18 | 2 | Natalia Kaczmarek | Poland | 54.32 | |
| 19 | 3 | Ivanna Avramchuk | Ukraine | 54.64 | |
| 20 | 3 | Erika Krūminaitė | Lithuania | 54.87 | SB |
| 21 | 2 | Lily Beckford | Great Britain | 54.88 | |
| 22 | 3 | Jenna Bromell | Ireland | 55.20 | |
| 23 | 1 | Vijona Kryeziu | Kosovo | 55.95 | |
| | 2 | Shaquania Dorsett | Bahamas | DNS | |

=== Final ===
| Rank | Lane | Name | Nationality | Time | Note |
|---|---|---|---|---|---|
| 1st place, gold medalist(s) | 5 | Tiffany James | Jamaica | 51.32 | WU20L |
| 2nd place, silver medalist(s) | 7 | Lynna Irby | United States | 51.39 | PB |
| 3rd place, bronze medalist(s) | 4 | Junelle Bromfield | Jamaica | 52.05 | |
| 4 | 6 | Jessica Thornton | Australia | 52.05 | PB |
| 5 | 2 | Maureen Nyatichi Thomas | Kenya | 52.09 | NU20R |
| 6 | 9 | Roxana Gómez | Cuba | 52.24 | PB |
| 7 | 8 | Natassha McDonald | Canada | 53.35 | |
| 8 | 3 | Dzhois Koba | Ukraine | 53.74 | |
