= 2016 IAAF World U20 Championships – Women's 4 × 400 metres relay =

The women's 4 × 400 metres relay event at the 2016 IAAF World U20 Championships was held at Zdzisław Krzyszkowiak Stadium on 23 and 24 July.

== Medalists ==
| Gold | Silver | Bronze |
|---|---|---|
| United States; Lynna Irby; Anna Cockrell; Karrington Winters; Samantha Watson; Hannah Waller*; Syaira Richardson* | Jamaica; Shannon Kalawan; Tiffany James; Stacey-Ann Williams; Junelle Bromfield; Roneisha McGregor* | Canada; Xahria Santiago; Ashlan Best; Natassha McDonald; Victoria Tachinski; Jazz Shukla* |

*Athletes who competed in heats only

== Records ==
| World Junior Record | United States | 3:27.60 | Grosseto, Italy | 18 July 2004 |
| Championship Record | United States | 3:27.60 | Grosseto, Italy | 18 July 2004 |
| World Junior Leading | Jamaica | 3:34.84 | St. George's, Jamaica | 28 March 2016 |

== Results ==
=== Heats ===
Qualification: First 3 of each heat (Q) plus the 2 fastest times (q) qualified for the final.

| Rank | Heat | Nation | Athletes | Time | Notes |
|---|---|---|---|---|---|
| 1 | 2 | Jamaica | Stacey-Ann Williams, Tiffany James, Roneisha McGregor, Junelle Bromfield | 3:33.18 | Q, WU20L |
| 2 | 1 | United States | Hannah Waller, Karrington Winters, Syaira Richardson, Samantha Watson | 3:34.64 | Q |
| 3 | 1 | Ukraine | Ivanna Avramchuk, Yana Kachur, Anastasiia Bryzgina, Dariya Stavnycha | 3:35.34 | Q, SB |
| 4 | 1 | Germany | Nelly Schmidt, Hendrikje Richter, Jana Reinert, Hannah Mergenthaler | 3:35.47 | Q, SB |
| 5 | 1 | Canada | Xahria Santiago, Jazz Shukla, Natassha McDonald, Victoria Tachinski | 3:35.47 | q, SB |
| 6 | 1 | Czech Republic | Lada Vondrová, Lucie Kruparová, Jana Slaviková, Zdenka Seidlová | 3:36.38 | q, NU20R |
| 7 | 1 | Australia | Jessica Thornton, Olivia Cason, Molly Blakey, Sarah Billings | 3:37.83 | SB |
| 8 | 2 | Italy | Rebecca Borga, Alessia Tirnetta, Eleonora Marchiando, Alice Mangione | 3:38.23 | Q, SB |
| 8 | 2 | Poland | Natalia Węglarz, Karolina Łozowska, Katarzyna Martyna, Natalia Kaczmarek | 3:38.23 | Q, SB |
| 10 | 2 | India | Tiasha Samaddar, V. Subha, Shaharbana Sidhique, Jisna Mathew | 3:45.07 | |
| 11 | 2 | France | Léna Kandissounon, Anaïs Seiller, Julie Hounsinou, Sarah Mingas | 3:46.12 | SB |
| | 2 | Bahrain | Iman Isa Jassim, Marta Hirpato, Basirah Sharifa Nasir, Aminat Yusuf Jamal | DQ | R170.20 |

=== Final ===
| Rank | Nation | Athletes | Time | Notes |
|---|---|---|---|---|
| 1st place, gold medalist(s) | United States | Lynna Irby, Anna Cockrell, Karrington Winters, Samantha Watson | 3:29.11 | WU20L |
| 2nd place, silver medalist(s) | Jamaica | Shannon Kalawan, Tiffany James, Stacey-Ann Williams, Junelle Bromfield | 3:31.01 | SB |
| 3rd place, bronze medalist(s) | Canada | Xahria Santiago, Ashlan Best, Natassha McDonald, Victoria Tachinski | 3:32.25 | NU20R |
| 4 | Germany | Eileen Demes, Hendrikje Richter, Jana Reinert, Hannah Mergenthaler | 3:32.63 | SB |
| 5 | Ukraine | Yana Kachur, Anastasiia Bryzgina, Dariya Stavnycha, Dzhois Koba | 3:33.95 | NU20R |
| 6 | Poland | Katarzyna Martyna, Karolina Łozowska, Natalia Węglarz, Natalia Kaczmarek | 3:36.95 | SB |
| 7 | Czech Republic | Lada Vondrová, Lucie Kruparová, Jana Slaviková, Zdenka Seidlová | 3:37.36 | |
| 8 | Italy | Alice Mangione, Rebecca Borga, Alessia Tirnetta, Eleonora Marchiando | 3:42.53 | |
