= Jazz Shukla =

Canadian athlete

Personal information
- Nationality: Canadian
- Born: 24 August 1998 (age 27) Toronto, Ontario

Sport
- Sport: Athletics
- Events: 800m, 1500m

Achievements and titles
- Personal bests: 800m: 1:58.20 (Montreal, 2024); 1500m: 4:10.32 (Vancouver, 2023)
Medal record
Women's athletics
Representing Canada
World U20 Championships
Bronze medal – third place	2016 Bydgoszcz	4x400 m relay
Pan American U20 Championships
Silver medal – second place	2017 Trujillo	800m

Jazz Shukla (born 24 August 1998) is a Canadian track and field athlete who competes over 800 metres.

== Early life ==
From Toronto, she attended Northern Secondary School before studying neuroscience at the University of Toronto. She competed at the 2016 IAAF World U20 Championships in Bydgoszcz, participating in the 800m and winning a bronze medal in the 4x400m relay. She won a silver medal at the 2017 Pan American Junior Games in the 800m as well as winning the Canadian 2017 junior national championships over 800 metres.

== Career ==
After a four-year hiatus from competing over 800 metres, Shukla ran a best time of 2:01.98 at the 2022 Speed River Inferno in Guelph, Ontario. At the same event in 2023, she set a new meeting record for the 800 metres, running 2:01.43. She placed third behind Madeleine Kelly and Aurora Rynda at the Canadian national championships in July 2023.

In 2023, she participated in the World Championships in Budapest, and ran a personal best time of 2:00.30 to advance to the semi-finals as the second fastest non-automatic. In the semi-finals, she ran yet another personal best time of 2:00.23 to finish in seventh.

She competed for Canada at the 2024 World Athletics Indoor Championships – Women's 800 metres. In June 2024, Shukla broke her personal best in the 800 metres by over a second by winning the 2024 Canadian trials. She competed in the 800 metres at the 2024 Summer Olympics in Paris in August 2024.

She was runner-up to Maeliss Trapeau in the 800 metres final at the Canadian Athletics Championships. She competed in the women's 800 metres at the 2025 World Athletics Championships in Tokyo, Japan.
