= Jessica Thornton =

Australian sprinter (born 1998)

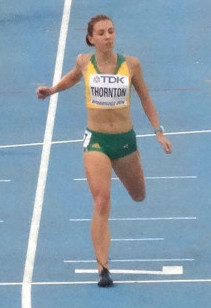
- Thornton in 2016

Personal information
- Nationality: Australian
- Born: 12 April 1998 (age 28) Australia
- Height: 1.70 m (5 ft 7 in)
- Weight: 59 kg (130 lb)

Sport
- Sport: Track and field
- Events: 200 metres, 400 metres

Achievements and titles
- Personal bests: 200 m: 23.26 (2016); 400 m: 52.05 (2016)

Jessica Thornton (born 12 April 1998) is an Australian track and field sprinter who competes in the 200 metres and 400 metres. She represented her country at the 2016 Summer Olympics. She holds a personal best of 52.05 seconds for the 400 m.

She was born in Randwick, New South Wales and studied nutrition science at the University of Wollongong. Thornton won the 400 m at the 2014 Summer Youth Olympics, setting a personal best of 52.50 seconds to beat Bahrain's Salwa Eid Naser. She ran for the Asia-Pacific relay team at the 2014 IAAF Continental Cup, though the team finished last. She was a relay finalist at the 2016 Summer Olympics alongside Anneliese Rubie, Caitlin Sargent and Morgan Mitchell.

== International competitions ==
Year	Competition	Venue	Position	Event	Notes
2014	Youth Olympic Games	Nanjing, China	1st	400 m	52.50
2014	Continental Cup	Marrakesh, Morocco	4th	4 × 400 m relay	3:36.89
2016	World U20 Championships	Bydgoszcz, Poland	4th	400 m	52.05
2016	World U20 Championships	Bydgoszcz, Poland	7th (h)	4 × 400 m relay	3:37.83
2016	Olympic Games	Rio de Janeiro, Brazil	8th	4 × 400 m relay	3:27.45
