= 2013 World Youth Championships in Athletics – Girls' 400 metres =

Girls' 400 metres at the 2013 World Youth Championships in Athletics
- Venue: RSC Olimpiyskiy
- Dates: 10 July (heats); 11 July (semifinal); 12 July (final)
- Competitors: 50
- Winning time: 52.77 PB

Medalists
gold medal	Sabrina Bakare	Great Britain
silver medal	Olivia Baker	United States
bronze medal	Tiffany James	Jamaica

The girls' 400 metres at the 2013 World Youth Championships in Athletics was held from 10 to 12 July.

== Medalists ==
Event	Gold	Silver	Bronze
Girls' 400 metres	Sabrina Bakare (GBR)	Olivia Baker (USA)	Tiffany James (JAM)

== Records ==
Prior to the competition, the records were as follows.

World Youth Best	Li Jing (CHN)	50.01	Shanghai, China	18 October 1997
Championship Record	Nawal El Jack (SUD)	51.19	Marrakesh, Morocco	15 July 2005
World Youth Leading	Olivia Baker (USA)	52.71	Edwardsville, United States	26 June 2013

== Heats ==
Qualification rule: first 3 of each heat (Q) plus the 3 fastest times (q) qualified.

=== Heat 1 ===
Rank	Lane	Name	Nationality	Time	Notes
1	4	Tiffany James	Jamaica	54.66	Q
2	2	Alanna Lally	Ireland	55.15	Q, PB
3	6	Ann-Kathrin Kopf	Germany	55.34	Q
4	8	Zdenka Seidlová	Czech Republic	55.65	q
5	7	Sonia Nasarre	Spain	57.54	
6	5	Emilija Rudytė	Lithuania	58.15	
7	3	Livia Cristurean	Romania	58.30	

=== Heat 2 ===
Rank	Lane	Name	Nationality	Time	Notes
1	5	Olivia Baker	United States	54.41	Q
2	2	Liang Xiaojing	China	55.19	Q
3	8	Susanne Walli	Austria	55.33	Q, PB
4	6	Abimbola Junaid	Nigeria	55.62	q
5	7	Maja Pogorevc	Slovenia	55.80	PB
6	3	Astrid Balanta	Colombia	56.39	PB
7	4	Anamarija Petters	Croatia	57.40	

=== Heat 3 ===
Rank	Lane	Name	Nationality	Time	Notes
1	4	Yanique McNeil	Jamaica	54.69	Q
2	7	Huang Guifen	China	54.92	Q
3	3	Anastasiya Kudryavtseva	Russia	55.51	Q
4	5	Viktória Zahradníčková	Slovakia	55.62	q, PB
5	8	Liliya Manasipova	Uzbekistan	57.35	
6	6	Laurence Jones	Luxembourg	57.60	
	2	Büsra Yildirim	Turkey	DQ	

=== Heat 4 ===
Rank	Lane	Name	Nationality	Time	Notes
1	8	Edidiong Odiong	Nigeria	55.18	Q
2	2	Emily Rose Norum	Norway	56.24	Q
3	6	Mariam Abdul-Rashid	Canada	56.80	Q
4	5	María Simancas	Venezuela	57.21	
5	3	Eleonora Marchiando	Italy	57.48	
6	7	Kianeth Galván	Panama	57.64	
7	4	Fathin Faqihah Mohd Yusuf	Malaysia	59.52	

=== Heat 5 ===
Rank	Lane	Name	Nationality	Time	Notes
1	3	Sabrina Bakare	Great Britain	54.16	Q
2	2	Molly Blakey	Australia	55.05	Q
3	7	Tarika Moses	British Virgin Islands	55.87	Q
4	6	Yana Kachur	Ukraine	56.00	PB
5	4	Andreea Timofei	Romania	56.48	
6	5	Jimena Copara	Peru	58.29	
7	8	Nirmali M.P. Gamage	Sri Lanka	59.24	

=== Heat 6 ===
Rank	Lane	Name	Nationality	Time	Notes
1	3	Nanako Matsumoto	Japan	55.07	Q
2	5	Melissa Gomis	France	55.34	Q
3	1	Shannon Gearey	New Zealand	55.69	Q
4	7	Daniela Ledecká	Slovakia	56.32	PB
5	6	Jaydean Joseph	Grenada	56.89	PB
6	4	Mariana Perez	Dominican Republic	57.23	PB
7	2	Fanjalina	Madagascar	59.99	
	8	Galefele Moroko	Botswana	DQ	

=== Heat 7 ===
Rank	Lane	Name	Nationality	Time	Notes
1	8	Nguyen Thi Oanh	Vietnam	54.64	Q
2	7	Kendra Clarke	Canada	54.95	Q
3	4	Luca Palásti	Hungary	55.67	Q
4	2	Alice Mangione	Italy	56.76	PB
5	5	Yvonne Vanhuvaone	Zimbabwe	57.07	
6	6	Kadeisha Hield	Bahamas	57.63	
	3	Kseniia Prokopeva	Kyrgyzstan	DQ	

== Semifinals ==
Qualification rule: first 2 of each heat (Q) plus the 2 fastest times (q) qualified.

=== Heat 1 ===
Rank	Lane	Name	Nationality	Time	Notes
1	4	Sabrina Bakare	Great Britain	53.23	Q, PB
2	6	Edidiong Odiong	Nigeria	54.15	Q, PB
3	8	Luca Palásti	Hungary	54.47	q, PB
4	5	Nanako Matsumoto	Japan	54.64	q
5	1	Zdeňka Seidlová	Czech Republic	54.94	
6	3	Liang Xiaojing	China	55.46	
7	2	Shannon Gearey	New Zealand	55.77	
8	7	Melissa Gomis	France	56.03	

=== Heat 2 ===
Rank	Lane	Name	Nationality	Time	Notes
1	6	Tiffany James	Jamaica	53.70	Q
2	3	Thi Oanh Nguyen	Vietnam	54.25	Q
3	5	Molly Blakey	Australia	54.95	
4	7	Ann-Kathrin Kopf	Germany	55.14	
5	8	Susanne Walli	Austria	55.29	PB
6	2	Viktória Zahradníčková	Slovakia	55.99	
7	4	Kendra Clarke	Canada	56.01	
8	1	Abimbola Junaid	Nigeria	56.33	

=== Heat 3 ===
Rank	Lane	Name	Nationality	Time	Notes
1	5	Olivia Baker	United States	53.63	Q
2	7	Anastasiya Kudryavtseva	Russia	54.85	Q, PB
3	4	Huang Guifen	China	54.92	
4	8	Emily Rose Norum	Norway	55.17	PB
5	3	Alanna Lally	Ireland	55.40	
6	1	Tarika Moses	British Virgin Islands	56.65	
7	2	Mariam Abdul-Rashid	Canada	56.70	
	6	Yanique McNeil	Jamaica	DQ	

== Final ==
The final was won by Sabrika Bakare in 52.77 seconds.

Rank	Lane	Name	Nationality	Time	Notes
1st place, gold medalist(s)	6	Sabrina Bakare	Great Britain	52.77	PB
2nd place, silver medalist(s)	5	Olivia Baker	United States	53.38	
3rd place, bronze medalist(s)	4	Tiffany James	Jamaica	53.56	
4	7	Thi Oanh Nyugen	Vietnam	53.80	PB
5	3	Edidiong Ofinome Odiong	Nigeria	54.14	PB
6	2	Nanako Matsumoto	Japan	54.59	
7	8	Anastasiya Kudryavtseva	Russia	54.69	PB
8	1	Luca Palásti	Hungary	54.81	
