= Samantha Watson =

American middle-distance runner (born 1999)

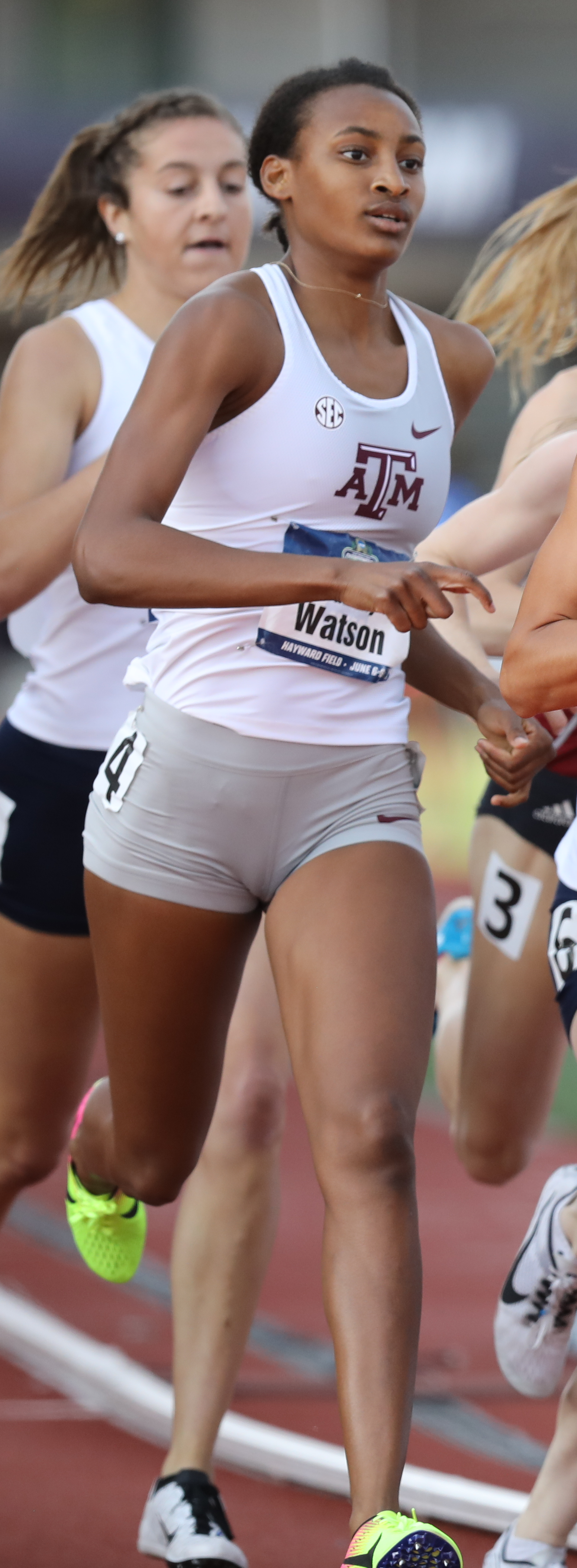
- Watson in 2018

Personal information
- Nationality: American
- Born: November 10, 1999 (age 27) Rochester, New York, U.S.
- Education: Temple University
- Height: 5 ft 10 in (178 cm)

Sport
- Sport: Track and field
- Events: 800 metres, Mile
- College team: Texas A&M '19; Rush-Henrietta Senior High School 2017
- Turned pro: 2019
- Coached by: Jebreh Harris

Achievements and titles
- Personal bests: 400 m: 52.69 (2015); 800 m: 1:59.96 (2024); 1500 m: 4:21.45 (2018)
Medal record
Women's athletics
Representing the United States
IAAF World U20 Championships
	2018 Tampere	800 m
Gold medal – first place	2016 Bydgoszcz	4x400 m
Gold medal – first place	2016 Bydgoszcz	800 m
IAAF World U18 Championships
Gold medal – first place	2015 Cali	800 m
Gold medal – first place	2015 Cali	M4x400 m

Samantha "Sammy" Watson (born November 10, 1999) is an American middle-distance runner from New York.

== Career ==
Watson placed sixth in 800 m in 2:00.99 at 2017 USA Track & Field Indoor Championships.

Watson placed sixth in 800 at 2019 USA Outdoor Track and Field Championships in Des Moines, Iowa in a time of 2:01.70.

Watson placed 11th in 800 meters at 2018 IAAF World U20 Championships – Women's 800 metres in Tampere, Finland in a time of 2:03.95.

Watson placed first in 800 meters at 2018 USA U20 Junior Outdoor Track and Field Championships in Bloomington, Indiana in a time of 2:01.46.

Sammy Watson finished sixth on Sunday, June 25, 2017 in the 800 meters at the United States National Outdoor Championships in Sacramento, California.

A time of 2:43.18 at 1,000 meters, set at altitude during the prelims 2017 USATF Indoor Championships held in Albuquerque, bettered the national high school record of 2:43.43 set in 2005 by Sarah Brown. In the final she lowered the record to 2:40.72 in placing fourth among a field of professional athletes.

Sammy Watson's 800 meters mark broke the 1974 national record of 2:01.8 set by Mary Decker and it is also the U.S. Junior record. Video: Sammy Watson After Running 2:01.78 800 to Break Mary Decker's HS Record.

International accolades for Sammy Watson include winning gold-medal as a 2016 World junior title in the 800 meters while and running on the gold-medal 4x400 relay. Watson made her second Team USA in Clovis, California at USA Junior (U20) Outdoor Track and Field Championships winning the 800 meters title in a time of 2:02.91.

In 2015, she was the World youth champion in the 800 meters. Watson was 15 when she claimed the World Youth 800m title in 2:03.54 after winning 2015 USA Junior Olympics 15-16 year old 800 meters title in a time of 2:08.73 and 15-16 year old 400 meters title in a time of 54.31 in Jacksonville, Florida.

Representing the United States
IAAF Championships
2018	2018 IAAF World Junior (U20) Championships	11th	800 m	2:03.95
2016	2016 IAAF World Junior (U20) Championships	1st	800 m	2:04.52
2016	2016 IAAF World Junior (U20) Championships	1st	4x400 m	3:29.11
2015	2015 IAAF World Youth (U18) Championships	1st	800 m	2:03.54
2015	2015 IAAF World Youth (U18) Championships	1st	Mixed 4 × 400 metres relay	3:19.54
USA Track and Field Championships
Representing Adidas
2023	2023 USA Outdoor Track and Field Championships	7th	800 m	2:02.07
2023	2023 USA Indoor Track and Field Championships	6th	800 m	2:03.04
2022	2022 USA Outdoor Track and Field Championships	10th	800 m	2:00.90
2022	2022 USA Indoor Track and Field Championships	6th	800 m	2:03.92
2021	2020 United States Olympic Trials	31st	800 m	2:03.83
2020	2020 USA Track & Field Indoor Championships	4th	800 m	2:04.11
2019	2019 USA Outdoor Track and Field Championships	6th	800 m	2:01.70
Representing Texas A&M University
2018	USA Junior (U20) Outdoor Track and Field Championships	1st	800 m	2:01.46
Representing Rush-Henrietta High School
2017	2017 USA Outdoor Track and Field Championships	6th	800 m	2:00.99
2017	2017 USA Indoor Track and Field Championships	4th	1000 m	2:40.72
2016	USA Junior (U20) Outdoor Track and Field Championships	1st	800 m	2:02.91
2015	USA Junior (U18) Outdoor Track and Field Championships	1st	800 m	2:01.46
2014	USATF National Junior Olympic Track & Field Championships	3rd	400 m	54.94
2014	USATF National Junior Olympic Track & Field Championships	2nd	800 m	2:06.35

== NCAA ==
Watson placed first in 800 meters in a time of 2:04.21 at the 2018 NCAA Division I Outdoor Track and Field Championships in Eugene, Oregon.

Watson placed first in 800 meters in a time of 2:03.37 at the 2018 Southeastern Conference Outdoor Track and Field Championships in Knoxville, Tennessee.

Watson placed third in 800 in a time of 2:02.65 at the 2018 NCAA Division I Indoor Track and Field Championships in College Station, Texas after winning her first title in the 800 m at 2018 SEC Indoor Track & Field Championships.

Watson ran on the 4th place Distance medley relay at Southeastern Conference final. Watson ran a time of 2:42.12 in the 1,000m which ranks seventh on the collegiate indoor all-time list and bettered the Texas A&M University school record of 2:43.15 set last season by Jasmine Fray. Texas A&M's Sammy Watson anchored the Aggie distance medley relay to a school and meet record of 11:12.06 to win the event at the Ted Nelson Invitational.

Representing Texas A&M University
Year	Southeastern Conference Indoor track and field Championships	NCAA Indoor Championships	Southeastern Conference Outdoor track and field Championships	NCAA Division I Outdoor track and field Championships
2018	800 m 1st 2:04.25	800 m 3rd 2:02.65	800 m 1st 2:03.37	800 m 1st 2:04.21
2018	DMR 4th 11:21.86		4x400 m 5th 3:29.61	

== Prep ==
In the 800m, Watson's 2:00.65 ranks third all-time in United States high school and she also produced five of the top 10 all-time performances. Watson's career best times by Watson from her high school career include 52.69 (400 meters), 1:27.13 (600 meters indoors), 2:00.65 (800 meters), 4:22.09 (1,500 meters) and 4:47.49 (mile indoors). In 2017 indoor season, Watson established national high school records at 600 meters (1:27.13), 800 meters (2:01.78) and 1,000 meters (2:40.72 A).

In the 2017 outdoor track season, Watson placed 5th in a time of 55.90 in 400 meters and 2nd in one mile invitational section in 4:47.72 at Arcadia Invitational in April 2017, ran 2:01.47 placed 3rd behind 1:59.87 winner Charlene Lipsey and runner up Chrishuna Williams in 800 meters at Prefontaine Classic in May 2017, placed 2nd in a time of 2:00.78 behind 1:59.57 winner Charlene Lipsey in 800 meters on June 2 at Adidas Boost Boston Games, and won 800 meters title in a time of 2:05.70 at 2017 New Balance Nationals Outdoor in Aggie Stadium in Greensboro, North Carolina on June 18, 2017 (1 week before USA Outdoor in Sacramento, California).
