= Jaide Stepter Baynes =

American track-and-field athlete (born 1994)

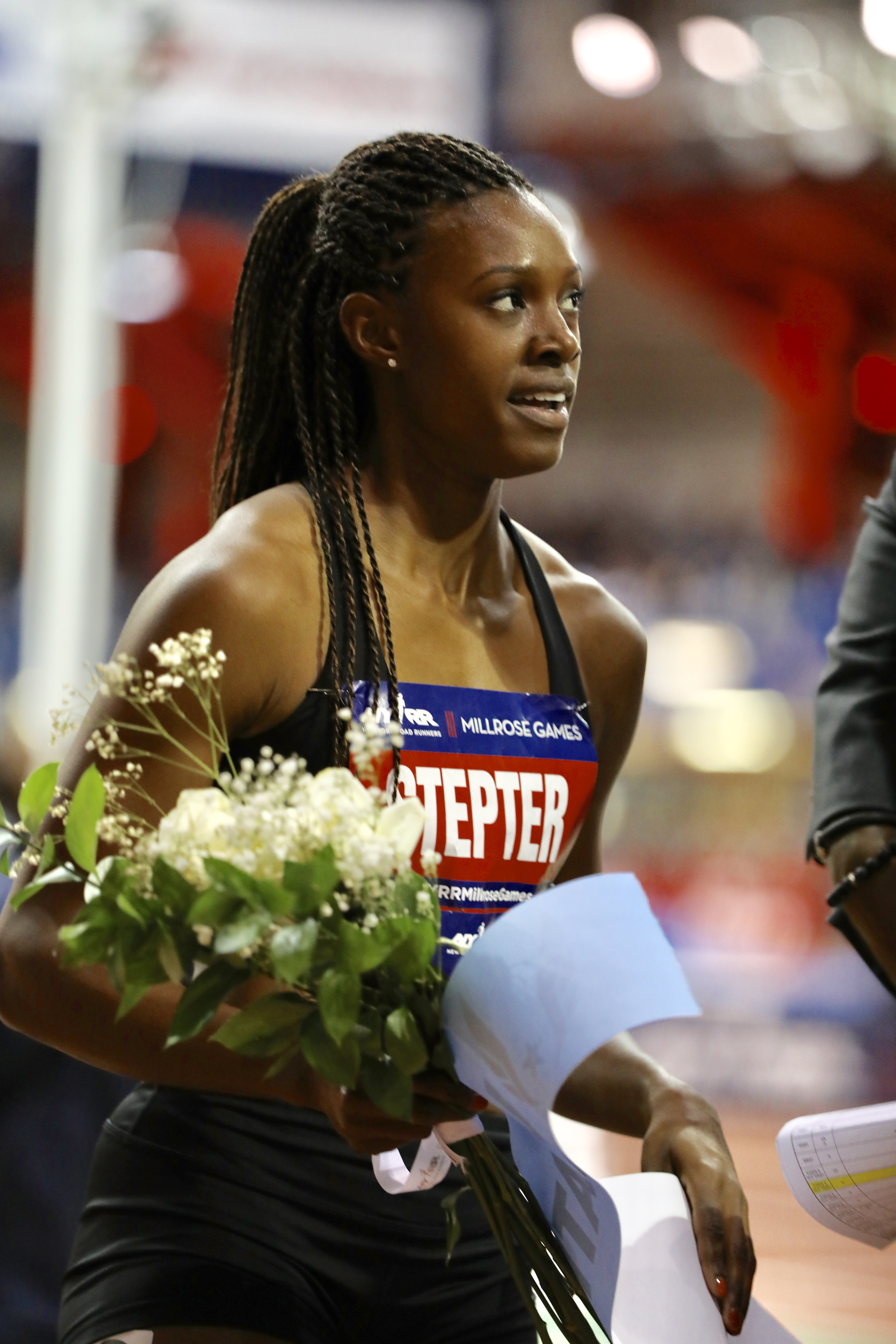
- Stepter in 2019

Personal information
- Full name: Jaide Alexandra Stepter Baynes
- Born: September 25, 1994 (age 31) Santa Ana, California, U.S.

Sport
- Sport: Track and field
- Event: 400 metres
Medal record
Women's athletics
Representing United States
World Championships
Gold medal – first place	2022 Eugene	4 × 400 m relay
Pan American Games
Gold medal – first place	2019 Lima	4 × 400 m relay

Jaide Alexandra Stepter Baynes (born September 25, 1994) is an American track and field athlete who specializes in the 400 metres.

== Early life ==
Stepter was born to Keith and LaTanya Sheffield. Her mother, LaTanya, is a retired Olympic hurdler and her coach. She attended Canyon del Oro High School in Oro Valley, Arizona. She set a state record in the 300 metres hurdles at the Chandler Rotary Invitational with a time of 42.18. She then set a personal-record and new state-record at the Arizona state championships with a time of 42.01. She won three individual state titles to help lead her team to a second-place finish at the 2012 Arizona state meet. Following the season she was named the 2012 Arizona Gatorade Female Track & Field Athlete of the Year.

== Junior career ==
She ran track and field for USC in college, where she was a nine-time All-American and set five school records in the 400 m hurdles, 400 m outdoor and indoor, as well as the 4 × 400 m relay in both the outdoor and indoor seasons. She was a three-time Pac-12 champion in the 400 m hurdles and was named the 2016 Pac-12 Track & Field Scholar-Athlete of the Year.

== Professional career ==
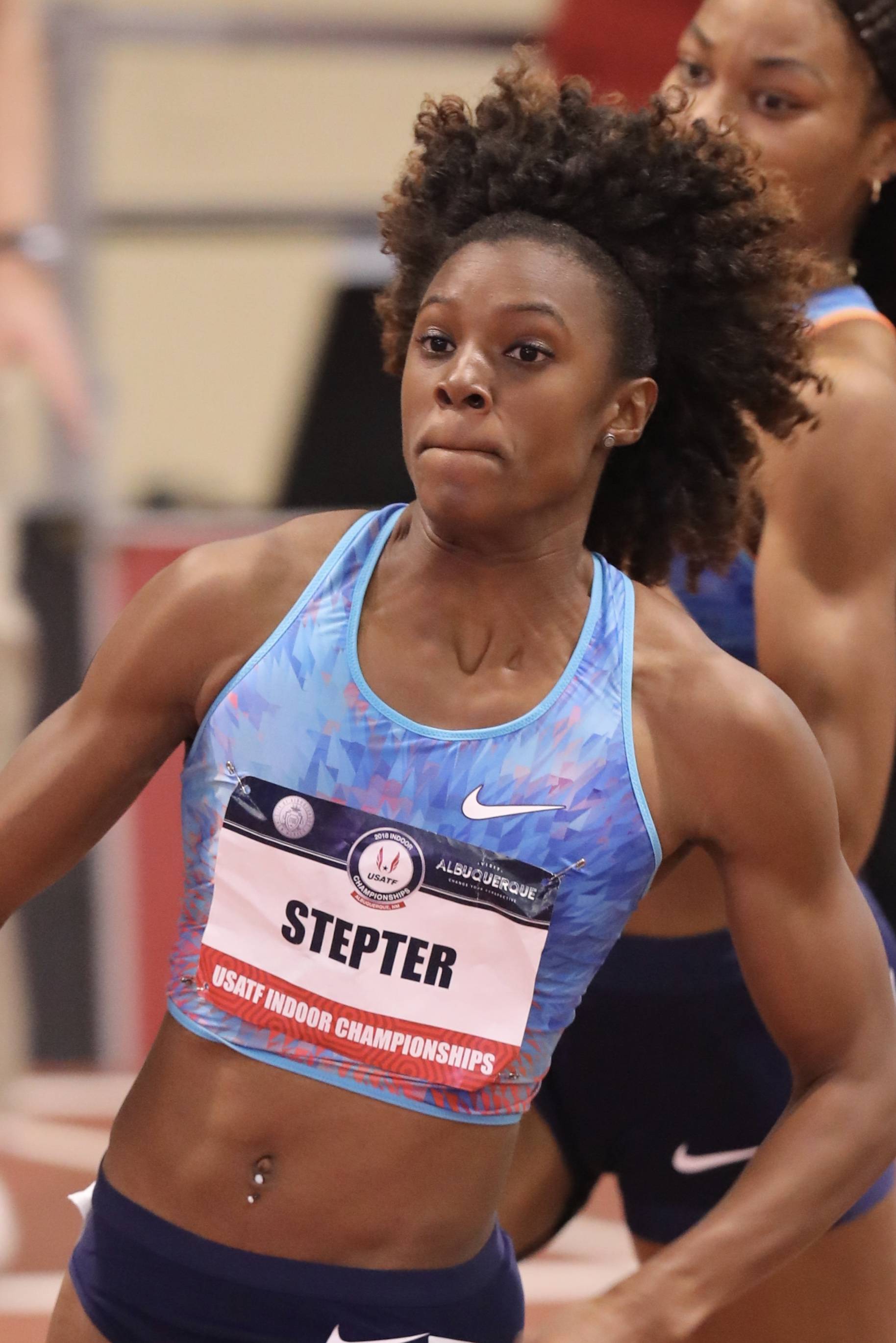
Stepter at the 2018 USA Indoor Track and Field Championships

Stepter competed at the 2016 United States Olympic trials in the 400 metres hurdles where she finished in seventh place in the finals with a time of 54.95. She then competed at the 2016 NACAC U23 Championships in Athletics and won a silver medal in the 400 metres and a gold medal in the 4 × 400 metres relay.

Stepter competed at the 2017 USA Outdoor Track and Field Championships in the 400 metres hurdles where she finished in seventh place with a time of 55.06. She competed at the 2018 USA Outdoor Track and Field Championships in the 200 metres where she finished in sixth place in the semi-final with a time of 22.87, and ended in 11th overall in the event. She again competed at the 2019 USA Outdoor Track and Field Championships in the 400 metres where she finished in sixth place in the semi-final with a time of 52.35, and ended in 12th overall in the event.

Stepter represented the United States at the 2019 Pan American Games where she won a gold medal in the women's 4 × 400 metres relay with a time of 3:26.46. She also competed in the women's 400 metres where she posted a time of 52.17 to qualify fourth overall in the semi-finals. However, she was disqualified during the finals.

Stepter competed at the 2020 United States Olympic trials in the 400 metres where she finished in fifth place in the semi-finals with a time of 51.77.

Stepter competed at the 2022 USA Outdoor Track and Field Championships in the 400 metres, where she finished in seventh place with a time of 51.30. She then represented the United States at the 2022 World Athletics Championships and won a gold medal in the women's 4 × 400 metres relay. She competed in the preliminary heats and her team finished with a season's best time of 3:23.38.

== Coaching career ==
Stepter served as a volunteer assistant track and field coach for Long Beach State during the 2018 season. On October 14, 2019, she was promoted to Director of Operations for the track and field team at Long Beach State.

== Competition record ==
Representing the United States
Year	Competition	Venue	Position	Event	Time
2016	NACAC U23 Championships	San Salvador, El Salvador	2nd	400 m	52.51
2016	NACAC U23 Championships	San Salvador, El Salvador	1st	4 × 400 m relay	3:28.45
2017	World Relays	Nassau, Bahamas	2nd	4 × 400 m mixed	3:17.29
2019	World Relays	Yokohama, Japan	2nd	4 × 400 m relay	3:27.65
2019	Pan American Games	Lima, Peru	1st	4 × 400 m relay	3:26.46
2022	World Championships	Eugene, Oregon	1st (h)	4 × 400 m relay	3:17.79
2022	NACAC Championships	Freeport, Bahamas	1st	4 × 400 m relay	3:23.54
