= 2026 World Athletics Ultimate Championship – Women's 400 metres =

Women's 400 metres at the 2026 World Athletics Ultimate Championship
- Venue: National Athletics Centre
- Location: Budapest, Hungary
- Dates: 11 September 2026 (semi-finals); 12 September 2026 (final)
- Competitors: 16 from 14 nations
- Winning time: 49.07 s

Champion
- Marileidy Paulino; Dominican Republic

The women's 400 metres was held over two rounds at the 2026 World Athletics Ultimate Championship at the National Athletics Centre in Budapest, Hungary on 11 and 12 September 2026. It was the first time the World Ultimate Championship is held. Athletes qualified by wildcard or by their world ranking.

== Background ==
Global records before the 2026 World Athletics Ultimate Championship
Record	Time	Athlete (nation)	Location	Date
World record	47.60	Marita Koch (GDR)	Canberra, Australia	6 October 1985
World lead	48.48	Marileidy Paulino (DOM)	Paris, France	28 June 2026

Area records before the 2026 World Athletics Ultimate Championship
Record	Time	Athlete (nation)	Location	Date
African record	49.10	Falilat Ogunkoya (NGR)	Atlanta, United States	29 July 1996
Asian record	48.14	Salwa Eid Naser (BHR)	Doha, Qatar	3 October 2019
European record	47.60	Marita Koch (GDR)	Canberra, Australia	6 October 1985
North, Central American, and Caribbean record	47.78	Sydney McLaughlin-Levrone (USA)	Tokyo, Japan	18 September 2025
Oceanian record	48.63	Cathy Freeman (AUS)	Atlanta, United States	29 July 1996
South American record	49.64	Ximena Restrepo (COL)	Barcelona, Spain	5 August 1992

== Qualification ==
For the 400 metres, sixteen athletes qualified, up to three by wildcard for winners of the event at the 2024 Summer Olympic, the 2025 World Athletics Championships, or the 2026 Diamond League final and the others by their position at the World Athletics Rankings for the event on 3 September 2026.

== Results ==
=== Semi-finals ===
The semi-finals were held on 11 September at 19:38 (UTC+2). First 4 of each heat (Q) qualified to the final.

==== Heat 1 ====
Place	Lane	Athlete	Nation	Time	Notes
1	6	Marileidy Paulino	Dominican Republic	49.58	Q
2	8	Salwa Eid Naser	Bahrain	49.67	Q
3	7	Nickisha Pryce	Jamaica	49.72	Q
4	5	Roxana Gómez	Cuba	50.34	Q
5	9	Yemi Mary John	Great Britain	50.38	
6	4	Ella Onojuvwevwo	Nigeria	50.50	
7	3	Sharlene Mawdsley	Ireland	51.28	
8	2	Alexis Holmes	United States	51.60	

==== Heat 2 ====
Place	Lane	Athlete	Nation	Time	Notes
1	8	Henriette Jæger	Norway	49.64	Q
2	4	Lieke Klaver	Netherlands	49.76	Q
3	7	Aaliyah Butler	United States	49.82	Q
4	3	Martina Weil	Chile	50.32	Q, SB
5	5	Natalia Bukowiecka	Poland	50.40	
6	6	Lurdes Gloria Manuel	Czech Republic	50.43	
7	9	Stacey-Ann Williams	Jamaica	50.52	
8	2	Mercy Oketch	Kenya	52.94	

=== Final ===
The final was held on 12 September at 18:08 (UTC+2).

Place	Lane	Athlete	Nation	Time	Notes
1st place, gold medalist(s)	7	Marileidy Paulino	Dominican Republic	49.07	
2	8	Henriette Jæger	Norway	49.28	
3	9	Nickisha Pryce	Jamaica	49.56	
4	5	Lieke Klaver	Netherlands	49.91	
5	3	Martina Weil	Chile	50.00	SB
6	4	Aaliyah Butler	United States	50.12	
7	2	Roxana Gómez	Cuba	50.21	
8	6	Salwa Eid Naser	Bahrain	50.22	
