= Tiffany James =

Jamaican sprinter (born 1997)

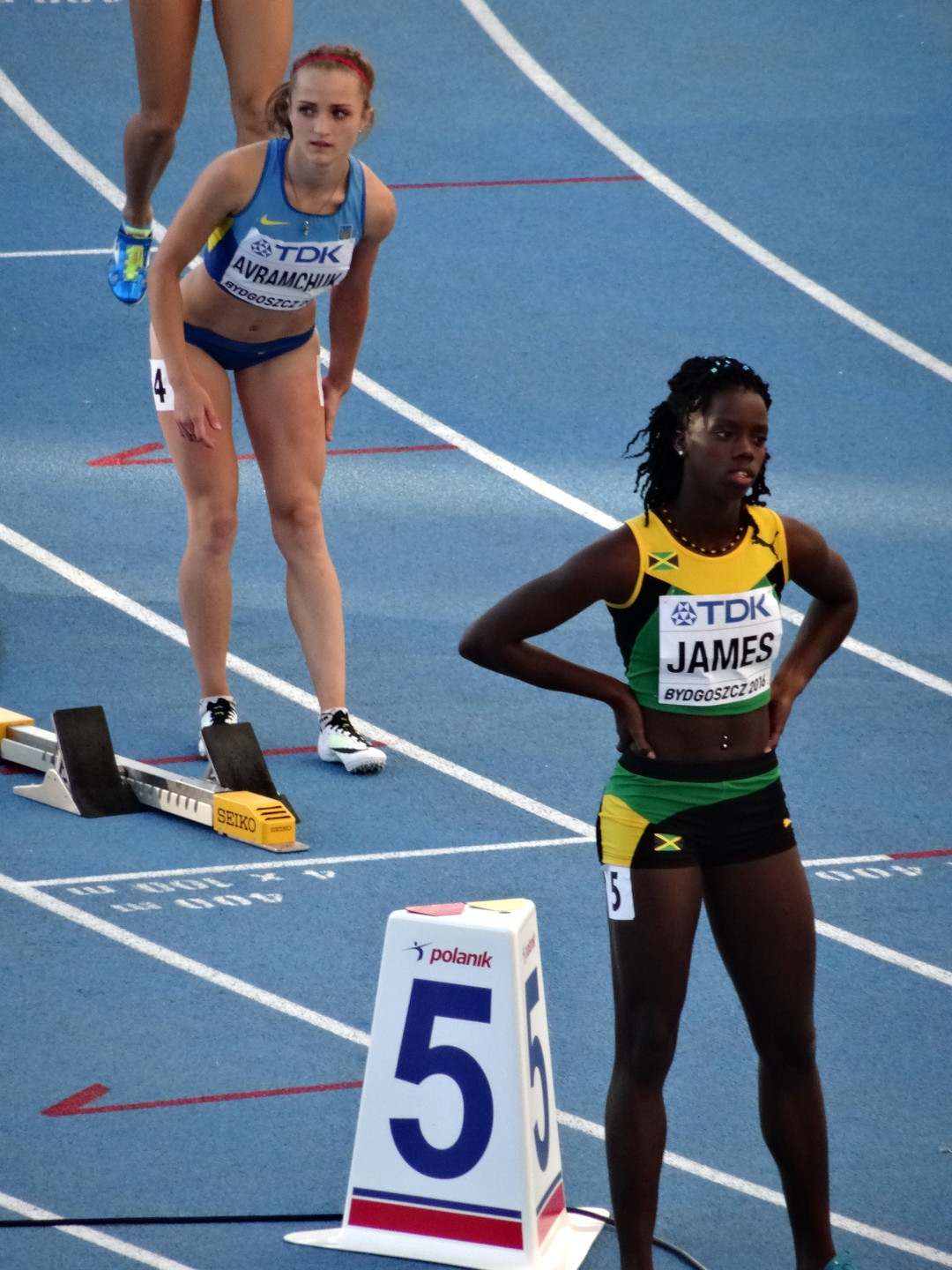
- Tiffany James in 2016

Personal information
- Nationality: Jamaican
- Born: 31 January 1997 (age 29)
- Height: 1.79 m (5 ft 10 in)
- Weight: 70 kg (154 lb)

Sport
- Country: Jamaica
- Sport: Athletics
- Event: Sprinting
Medal record
Women's athletics
Representing Jamaica
World Championships
| Silver medal – second place | 2019 Doha | 4 × 400 m mixed |
| Bronze medal – third place | 2019 Doha | 4 × 400 m relay |
| Silver medal – second place | 2022 Eugene | 4 × 400 m relay |
World Indoor Championships
| Gold medal – first place | 2022 Belgrade | 4 × 400 m relay |
Pan American Games
| Bronze medal – third place | 2019 Lima | 4 × 400 m relay |
NACAC Championships
| Silver medal – second place | 2018 Toronto | 4 × 400 m relay |
Central American and Caribbean Games
| Gold medal – first place | 2018 Barranquilla | 400 m |
| Silver medal – second place | 2018 Barranquilla | 4 × 400 m relay |
World U20 Championships
| Gold medal – first place | 2016 Bydgoszcz | 400 m |
| Silver medal – second place | 2016 Bydgoszcz | 4 × 400 m relay |
World Youth Championships
| Bronze medal – third place | 2015 Dontesk | 400 m |

Tiffany Donnama James (born 31 January 1997) is a Jamaican sprinter who specialized in the 400 metres and the 4 × 400 metres relay.

== Youth and junior career ==
She won numerous gold and other medals at the 2012, 2013, 2014, 2015 and 2016 CARIFTA Games.

At the 2013 World Youth Championships, she won the bronze medal in the 400 metres but was disqualified in the medley relay. Her relay team was again disqualified at the 2014 World Junior Championships, in addition to not reaching the individual 400 metres final at the same event. At the 2014 Summer Youth Olympics she reached the final in neither the 400 metres nor the relay. Her gold medal at the 2013 World Youth Championships, though, made her "the first Jamaican female to win gold in the event at a global meet".

At her final World U20 Championships in 2016, she won the gold medal in the 400 metres and a silver medal in the 4 × 400 metres relay.

== Senior career ==
In 2018, James started competing regularly for the Jamaican national relay team. She first ran in the heats at the 2018 World Indoor Championships, then at the Penn Relays, at the 2018 Athletics World Cup finishing second before winning silver medals at both the 2018 Central American and Caribbean Games and the 2018 NACAC Championships. Individually, she won the gold medal at the 2018 Central American and Caribbean Games.

In 2019, she again ran at the Penn Relays as well as the 2019 World Relays. Her individual successes were limited this year, not making it to the final at the 2019 NACAC U23 Championships, but she finished the season with three major medals in the relay: a bronze medal at the 2019 Pan American Games, followed by the 2019 World Championships where she helped win silver in the mixed 4 × 400 metres relay and bronze in the women's 4 × 400 metres relay.

James missed most of 2020 and mostly competed in Jamaica and the US in 2021.

In 2022, she ran for the relay team in the heats at the 2022 World Indoor Championships as well as the 2022 World Championships. She reprised her role in the final round of the mixed 4 × 400 metres relay at the 2022 World Championships, in which her team finished fifth.
