= Dzhois Koba =

Ukrainian sprinter (born 1998)

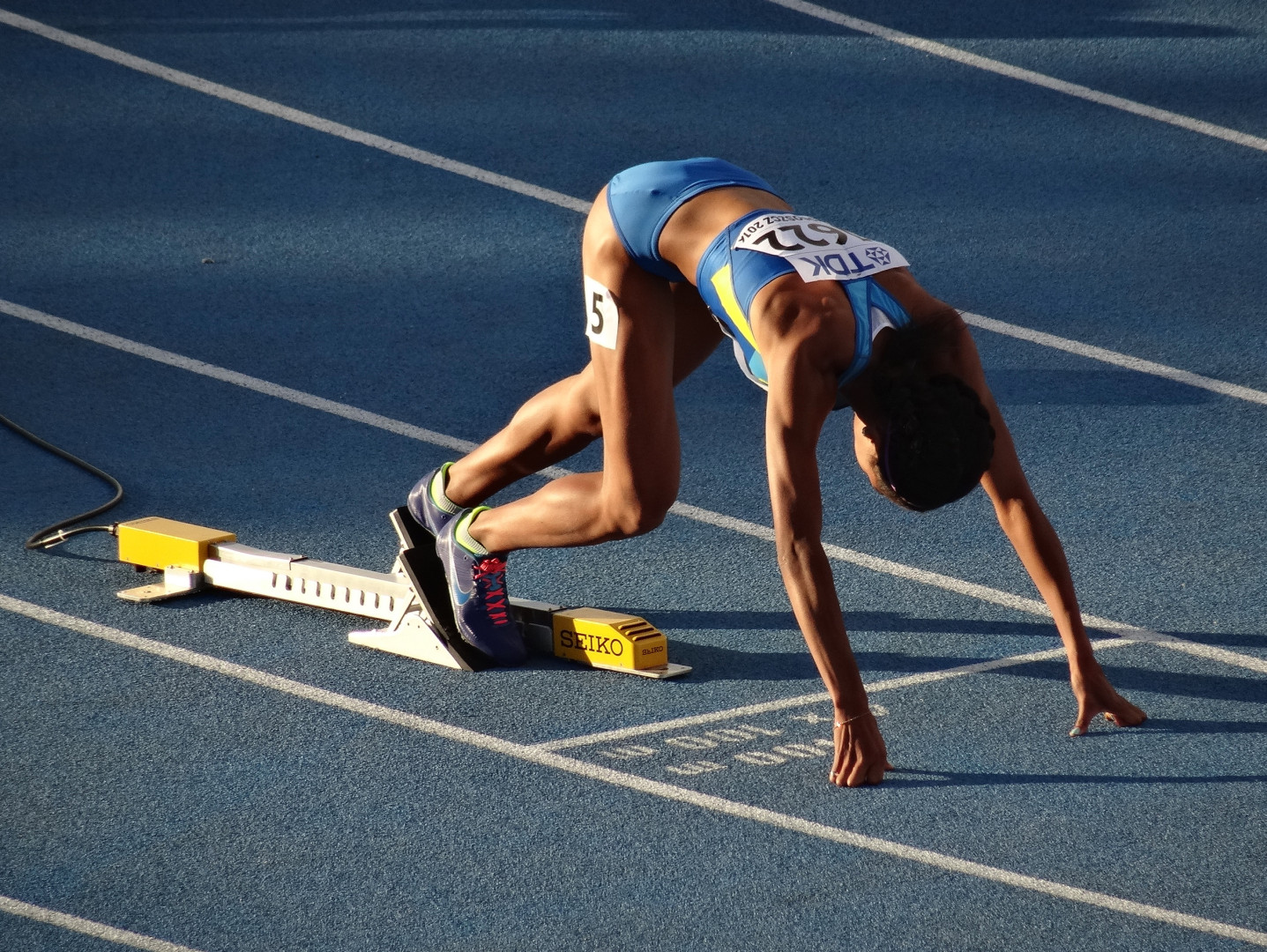
- Dzhois Koba in 2016

Personal information
- Born: 26 February 1998 (age 28) Vinnytsia, Ukraine

Sport
- Sport: Track and field
- Event(s): 200 metres, 400 metres

Dzhois Habrielivna Koba (Ukrainian: Джойс Габріелівна Коба; born 26 February 1998 in Vinnytsia) is a Ukrainian athlete competing in sprinting events. She won a silver medal in the 200m at the 2014 Summer Youth Olympics in Nanjing, China.

== Competition record ==
Year	Competition	Venue	Position	Event	Notes
Representing Ukraine
2013	European Youth Olympic Festival	Utrecht, Netherlands	2nd	400 m	54.99
2013	European Youth Olympic Festival	Utrecht, Netherlands	2nd	4 × 100 m relay	46.81
2014	Youth Olympic Games	Nanjing, China	2nd	200 m	23.94
2015	World Youth Championships	Cali, Colombia	10th (sf)	400 m	54.26
2016	World Indoor Championships	Portland, United States	5th	4 × 400 m relay	3:40.42
2016	World U20 Championships	Bydgoszcz, Poland	9th	400 m	53.74
2016	World U20 Championships	Bydgoszcz, Poland	5th	4 × 400 m relay	3:33.95
2017	European U20 Championships	Grosseto, Italy	11th (sf)	400 m	54.70
2017	European U20 Championships	Grosseto, Italy	1st	4 × 400 m relay	3:32.82

== Personal bests ==
Outdoor

- 100 metres – 11.97 (+1.2 m/s, Kirovohrad 2014)
- 200 metres – 23.81 (-1.0 m/s, Baku 2014)
- 400 metres – 52.79 (Bydgoszcz 2016)

Indoor

- 400 metres – 55.01 (Sumy 2016)
