= Athletics at the 2013 European Youth Summer Olympic Festival =

The athletics competition at the 2013 European Youth Summer Olympic Festival was held from 15 to 19 July 2013. The events took place in Utrecht, Netherlands. Boys and girls born 1996 or 1997 or later participated 36 track and field events, divided evenly between the sexes.

== Medal summary ==
=== Boys ===
Event	Gold		Silver		Bronze	
100 m	Keny Blécourt; France	10.75	Luis David del Valle Alba; Spain	10.77	Daniel Szabo; Hungary	10.83
200 m	Stanislau Darahakupets; Belarus	21.85	Jachym Prochazka; Czech Republic	22.06	Ludgi Sillon; France	22.07
400 m	Alexander Doom; Belgium	47.93	Benjamin Lobo Vedel; Denmark	48.37	Zeno Morau; Romania	49.09
800 m	Benediktas Mickus; Lithuania	1:55.50	Madalin Dorian Gheban; Romania	1:55.53	Pierrick Loir; France	1:56.21
1500 m	Baptiste Mischler; France	3:57.38	William Crowe; Ireland	3:59.08	Riccardo Usai; Italy	4:00.61
3000 m	Mateusz Borkowski; Poland	8:28.89	Ömer Oti; Turkey	8:31.28	Mohamed-Amine el Bouaajaji; France	8:31.68
2000 m St.	Alexis Rodríguez; Spain	5:57.58	Anthony Pointier; France	6:00.67	Maksym Pasievin; Ukraine	6:02.98
110 m H (91.4 cm)	Sébastien Calmé; France	13.99	Juan José Garrancho; Spain	14.01	Gordon Sklavy; Austria	14.10
400 m H (84.0 cm)	Victor Coroller; France	52.85	Dominik Hufnagal; Austria	52.95	Ivan Loginov; Russia	53.19
4×100m relay	France; Sébastien Calmé; Ludgi Sillon; Victor Coroller; Keny Blecourt	42.33	Italy; Francesco Lama; Gabriele Segale; Andrea Vergnano; Diego Pettorossi	42.66	Netherlands; Jochem Dobber; Joris van Gool; Rutger Postma; Sander Brugge	42.19
High jump	Danil Lysenko; Russia	2.08	Ionut Cristian Manea; Romania	2.06	Titouan Sajous; France	2.02
Pole vault	Noel Aman del Cerro; Spain	4.82	Hans-Christian Hausenberg; Estonia	4.82	Antoine Taillandier; France	4.77
Long jump	Gabriel Bitan; Romania	7.41	Ivan Vujević; Croatia	7.05	Aleksei Levanov; Russia	7.05
Triple jump	Nazim Babayev; Azerbaijan	15.53	Vitalii Pavlov; Russia	15.17	Alejandro Kedar; Spain	14.97
Shot put (5 kg)	Konrad Bukowiecki; Poland	21.41 CR	Andrei Toader; Romania	18.53	Leonardo Fabbri; Italy	17.76
Discus (1.5 kg)	Bence Halász; Hungary	61.13	Konrad Bukowiecki; Poland	58.35	Andrei Toader; Romania	56.49
Hammer throw (5 kg)	Bence Halász; Hungary	74.63	Hlib Piskunov; Ukraine	69.44	Ville Järvinen; Finland	68.11
Javelin (700 g)	Emin Öncel; Turkey	68.50	Jyri Isokääntä; Finland	66.96	Patriks Gailums; Latvia	65.73

=== Girls ===
Event	Gold		Silver		Bronze	
100 metres	Paraskevi Andreou (CYP)	11.76	Tasa Jiya (NED)	12.04	Katerina Vavrová (CZE)	12.12
200 metres	Tasa Jiya (NED)	24.10	Melinda Ferenczi (HUN)	24.11	Roseanna McGuckian (IRL)	24.42
400 metres	Lyndra-Sareena Carti (FRA)	54.31	Dzhois Koba (UKR)	54.99	Anne Sofie Kirkegaard (DEN)	55.39
800 metres	Louise Shanahan (IRL)	2:08.75	Lotte Scheldeman (BEL)	2:09.15	Danaïd Prinsen (NED)	2:09.77
1500 metres	Yelena Paushkina (RUS)	4:25.98	Cassandre Beaugrand (FRA)	4:27.86	Kateryna Siryak (UKR)	4:28.57
3000 metres	Maria Ifteni (ROU)	9:41.26	Siobhra O'Flaherty (IRL)	9:42.47	Francesca Tommasi (ITA)	9:46.96
2000 metres steeplechase	Lili Anna Tóth (HUN)	6:45.45	Veerle Bakker (NED)	6:56.78	Seyma Gul (TUR)	6:57.56
100 metres hurdles (76.2 cm) (+3.2 m/s)	Laura Valette (FRA)	13.70	Chloe Beaucarne (BEL)	13.77	Elvira Herman (BLR)	13.92
400 metres hurdles (76.2 cm)	Aneja Simončič (SLO)	60.27	Michaela Pešková (SVK)	60.68	Coralie Gassama (FRA)	60.74
4×100m relay	Ireland; Phoebe Murphy; Roseanna McGuckian; Laura Ann Costello; Niamh McNicol	46.55	Ukraine; Yana Khabina; Maryna Yachnik; Maryna Piriyeva; Dzhois Koba	46.81	Belgium; Judith Dillens; Paulien Couckuyt; Laurence Lobbens; Manon Depuydt	46.89
High jump	Paulina Borys (POL)	1.79 m	Michaela Hrubá (CZE)	1.79 m	Sofiya Voronina (RUS); Lara Omerzu (SLO)	1.77 m
Pole vault	Angelica Moser (SUI)	4.07 m	Elina Lampela (FIN)	4.02 m	Leda Krošelj (SLO)	3.82 m
Long jump	Anastisya Seleznyova (RUS)	6.11 m	Hanne Maudens (BEL)	6.06 m (w)	Tina Božič (SLO)	6.00 m (w)
Triple jump	Yanis David (FRA)	12.92 m (w)	Anastasia Calinina (MDA)	12.80 m	Tina Božič (SLO)	12.60 m (w)
Shot put (3 kg)	Alyona Bugakova (RUS)	17.60 m	Kristina Rakočević (MNE)	15.79 m	Benthe Konig (NED)	15.23 m
Discus throw (1 kg)	Kristina Rakočević (MNE)	46.49 m	Carla Francesca Sescu (ROU)	46.37 m	Anastasiya Vityugova (RUS)	45.41 m
Hammer throw (3 kg)	Zsófia Bácskay (HUN)	68.56 m	Viktoriya Holda (UKR)	62.28 m	Maryia Litvinka (BLR)	61.82 m
Javelin throw (500 g)	Eda Tuğsuz (TUR)	56.61 m	Anna Tarasiuk (BLR)	56.46 m	Natálie Durčáková (CZE)	53.90 m

== See also ==
- European Youth Olympic Festival
