= Athletics at the 2019 Pan American Games – Women's 4 × 400 metres relay =

Women's 4 × 400 metres relay at the 2019 Pan American Games
- Venue: Athletics Stadium
- Dates: August 10
- Competitors: 36 from 9 nations
- Winning time: 3:26.46

Medalists
Gold medal	Lynna Irby; Jaide Stepter; Anna Cockrell; Courtney Okolo; United States
Silver medal	Natassha McDonald; Aiyanna Stiverne; Kyra Constantine; Sage Watson; Canada
Bronze medal	Stephenie Ann McPherson; Tiffany James; Natoya Goule; Roneisha McGregor; Jamaica

The women's 4 × 400 metres relay competition of the athletics events at the 2019 Pan American Games took place on the 10th of August at the 2019 Pan American Games Athletics Stadium. The defending Pan American Games champion is United States.

== Summary ==
With all 9 lanes filled, USA's Lynna Irby took off from the gun, making up the stagger on Chile's Martina Weil-Restrepo. Though looking impressive, she paid for the early speed by tying up on the home stretch, Jamaica's Olympic relay silver medalist Stephanie Ann McPherson putting her team in a clear lead ahead of Cuba and Canada. As Canada's Aiyanna Stiverne took the break, with Cuba's Rose Mary Almanza Blanco looking for running room, USA's Jaide Stepter calmly worked her way behind them. Coming off the turn she cruised by into second place handing off to 400 hurdle silver medalist Anna Cockrell. Down the backstretch, Cockrell opened up 5 metres on Canada's Kyra Constantine, but through the second turn, Constantine pulled that back in, then pounced to zoom past not only Cockrell but Jamaica's 800 meter champion Natoya Goule. The medals were decided for the anchor leg with Canada's 400 meter champion Sage Watson a step ahead of Jamaica's Roniesha McGregor a step ahead of USA's Courtney Okolo. Cuba was more than 20 metres back. The gap tightened through the final turn as McGregor closed on Watson and Okolo closed on McGregor, moving to her outer shoulder then pouncing, sprinting away from Watson and McGregor for the USA win by 3 metres. Watson separated from McGregor by the same 3 metres for a Canadian silver.

== Records ==
Prior to this competition, the existing world and Pan American Games records were as follows:

World record	Soviet Union	3:15.17	Seoul, South Korea	October 1, 1988
Pan American Games record	United States	3:23.35	Indianapolis, United States	August 16, 1987

== Schedule ==
Date	Time	Round
August 10, 2019	16:40	Final

== Results ==
All times shown are in seconds.

KEY:	q	Fastest non-qualifiers	Q	Qualified	NR	National record	PB	Personal best	SB	Seasonal best	DQ	Disqualified

=== Final ===
The results were as follows:

Rank	Lane	Nation	Name	Time	Notes
1st place, gold medalist(s)	4	United States	Lynna Irby, Jaide Stepter, Anna Cockrell, Courtney Okolo	3:26.46	
2nd place, silver medalist(s)	6	Canada	Natassha McDonald, Aiyanna Stiverne, Kyra Constantine, Sage Watson	3:27.01	SB
3rd place, bronze medalist(s)	7	Jamaica	Stephenie Ann McPherson, Tiffany James, Natoya Goule, Roneisha McGregor	3:27.61	SB
4	8	Cuba	Zurian Hechavarría, Rose Mary Almanza, Marelys Alfonso, Roxana Gómez	3:30.89	SB
5	1	Puerto Rico	Pariis García, Grace Claxton, Alethia Marrero, Gabriella Scott	3:32.03	
6	9	Colombia	Lina Licona, Melissa Gonzalez, Rosangélica Escobar, Jennifer Padilla	3:33.02	
7	5	Chile	Martina Weil-Restrepo, Stephanie Saavedra, María Echeverría, María Fernanda Mackenna	3:39.95	
8	3	Argentina	María Ayelén Diogo, Fiorella Chiappe, Valeria Baron, Noelia Martínez	3:41.39	
9	2	Peru	Triana Alonso, Jimena Copara, Kimberly Cardoza, Maitté Torres	3:45.54	
