= Natalia Bukowiecka =

Polish sprinter (born 1998)

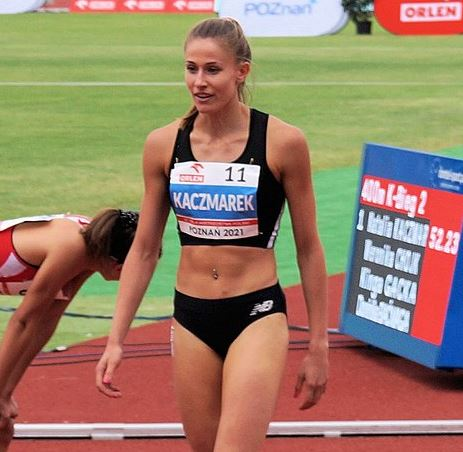
- Bukowiecka at the Polish Athletics Championships in 2021

Personal information
- Born: Natalia Kaczmarek; 17 January 1998 (age 28) Drezdenko, Lubusz Voivodeship, Poland
- Height: 1.74 m (5 ft 9 in)

Sport
- Country: Poland
- Sport: Track and field
- Event: Sprints
- Club: KS Podlasie Białystok

Achievements and titles
- Personal bests: 400 m: 48.90 NR (2024); Outdoors; 400 m: 50.83 NR (2023)
Medal record
Women's athletics
Representing Poland
Olympic Games
Gold medal – first place	2020 Tokyo	4 × 400 m mixed
Silver medal – second place	2020 Tokyo	4 × 400 m relay
Bronze medal – third place	2024 Paris	400 m
World Championships
Silver medal – second place	2023 Budapest	400 m
World Indoor Championships
Silver medal – second place	2018 Birmingham	4 × 400 m relay
Silver medal – second place	2026 Toruń	400 metres
Bronze medal – third place	2022 Belgrade	4 × 400 m relay
World Relays
Silver medal – second place	2021 Chorzów	4 × 400 m relay
Silver medal – second place	2024 Nassau	4 × 400 m relay
European Championships
Gold medal – first place	2018 Berlin	4 × 400 m relay
Gold medal – first place	2024 Rome	400 m
Silver medal – second place	2022 Munich	400 m
Silver medal – second place	2026 Birmingham	400 m
Silver medal – second place	2022 Munich	4 × 400 m relay
European Indoor Championships
Bronze medal – third place	2021 Toruń	4 × 400 m relay
European Games
Silver medal – second place	2023 Kraków-Małopolska	400 m
Silver medal – second place	2023 Kraków-Małopolska	4 × 400 m mixed
European U23 Championships
Gold medal – first place	2019 Gävle	400 m
Gold medal – first place	2019 Gävle	4 × 400 m relay

Natalia Bukowiecka (née Kaczmarek; born 17 January 1998) is a Polish sprinter who specialises in the 400 metres. She is a three-time Olympic Games medallist and won the gold medal in the mixed 4 × 400 metres relay and the silver medal in the 4 × 400 metres relay at the 2020 Summer Olympics, and the bronze medal in the 400 metres at the 2024 Summer Olympics.

Bukowiecka is also a World Championships silver medallist, European Championships gold and two-time silver medallist and European Games silver medallist in the 400 metres, and a World Indoor Championships silver and bronze medallist, two-time World Relays silver medallist, European Championships gold and silver medallist and European Indoors Championships bronze medallist in the 4 × 400 metres relay. Bukowiecka holds the Polish national record in the 300 m and 400 m both outdoors and indoors, and the 4 × 400 m relay and mixed 4 × 400 m relay outdoors.

== Career ==
Running in the heats as part of the women's 4 × 400 metres relays, Bukowiecka won the silver medal at the 2018 World Indoor Championships and a gold at the 2018 European Championships.

In the same relay event, she earned the bronze medal at the 2021 European Indoor Championships. In May, she took two gold medals at the European Team Championships, whose Super League events took place in Chorzów, Poland. Besides women's 4 × 400 metres relay victory she won the individual 400 metres event.

Bukowiecka won two medals at the delayed Tokyo Olympics in 2021, a gold with Poland's mixed 4 × 400 relay team (alongside Karol Zalewski, Justyna Święty-Ersetic and Kajetan Duszyński), and a silver as a member of women's 4 × 400 m relay with Iga Baumgart-Witan, Małgorzata Hołub-Kowalik and Święty-Ersetic. Kaczmarek went out of the individual 400 m event in the third semi-final in a time of 50.79 seconds.

In May 2022, she won 400 m race at the Golden Spike meet in Ostrava, smashing her previous personal best with a time of 50.16 seconds, the second-fastest mark on the Polish all-time list.

On 6 August 2022, she improved her personal best to 49.86 seconds at the Kamila Skolimowska Memorial in Chorzów, becoming only the second Polish woman after Irena Szewińska to run 400 metres under 50 seconds.

On 15 February 2023, Bukowiecka became the first Polish woman to break the 51-second barrier in the indoor 400 m with a time of 50.90 seconds, finishing second behind only Femke Bol at the prestigious Meeting Hauts-de-France Pas-de-Calais in Liévin, France.

On 23 August 2023, she competed in the Women's 400 metres event at the 2023 World Athletics Championships achieving 49.57 seconds and winning the silver medal. She became the first Polish athlete to win a medal in this event since Irena Szewińska.

On 10 June 2024, Bukowiecka won the European title in the 400 metres in a time of 48.98 seconds at the European Athletics Championships in Rome. This time broke the long-standing Polish national record of Irena Szewińska, which had stood since 1976.

== Personal life ==
On 28 September 2024, Bukowiecka married Polish shot putter Konrad Bukowiecki with whom she had been in a relationship since 2018.

== Personal bests ==
Information from her World Athletics profile unless otherwise noted.

=== Individual events ===
- 100 metres – 11.73 (+1.8 m/s, Jelenia Góra 2022)
- 200 metres – 22.70 (Golęcin Stadion, Poznan (POL) 23 JUN 2024)
  - 200 metres indoor – 23.30 (Toruń 2023)
- 300 metres – 35.52 (Potchefstroom 2024) NR
  - 300 metres indoor – 36.20 (Spała 2022) NR
- 400 metres – 48.90 (London 2024) NR
  - 400 metres indoor – 50.83 (Toruń 2023) NR

=== Team events ===
- 4 × 400 metres relay – 3:20.53 (Tokyo 2021) NR
  - 4 × 400 metres relay indoor – 3:28.59 (Belgrade 2022)
- 4 × 400 metres relay mixed – 3:09.87 (Tokyo 2021) NR

== Competition results ==
Information from her World Athletics profile unless otherwise noted.

=== International competitions ===
Representing Poland
Year	Competition	Venue	Position	Event	Time	Notes
2015	World Youth Championships	Cali, Colombia	9th (sf)	400 m	54.25	
2015	World Youth Championships	Cali, Colombia	5th	4 × 400 m mixed	3:24.64	
2016	World U20 Championships	Bydgoszcz, Poland	18th (sf)	400 m	54.32	
2016	World U20 Championships	Bydgoszcz, Poland	6th	4 × 400 m relay	3:36.95	
2017	European U20 Championships	Grosseto, Italy	7th	400 m	54.27	
2017	European U20 Championships	Grosseto, Italy	4th	4 × 400 m relay	3:34.48	
2018	World Indoor Championships	Birmingham, United Kingdom	2nd (heats)	4 × 400 m relay i	3:32.07	(Note: Time from the heats; Bukowiecka was replaced in the final.)
2018	European Championships	Berlin, Germany	1st (heats)	4 × 400 m relay	3:28.52	
2019	European U23 Championships	Gävle, Sweden	1st	400 m	52.34	
2019	European U23 Championships	Gävle, Sweden	1st	4 × 400 m relay	3:32.56	
2021	European Indoor Championships	Toruń, Poland	3rd	4 × 400 m relay i	3:29.94	
2021	World Relays	Chorzów, Poland	2nd	4 × 400 m relay	3:28.81	
2021	European Team Championships Super League	Chorzów, Poland	1st	400 m	51.36	
2021	European Team Championships Super League	Chorzów, Poland	1st	4 × 400 m relay	3:26.37	EL
2021	Olympic Games	Tokyo, Japan	12th (sf)	400 m	50.79	
2021	Olympic Games	Tokyo, Japan	2nd	4 × 400 m relay	3:20.53	NR
2021	Olympic Games	Tokyo, Japan	1st	4 × 400 m mixed	3:09.87	OR AR
2022	World Indoor Championships	Belgrade, Serbia	7th (sf)	400 m i	51.87	
2022	World Indoor Championships	Belgrade, Serbia	3rd	4 × 400 m relay i	3:28.59	SB
2022	World Championships	Eugene, OR, United States	15th (sf)	400 m	51.34	
2022	World Championships	Eugene, OR, United States	4th	4 × 400 m mixed	3:12.31	SB
2022	European Championships	Munich, Germany	2nd	400 m	49.94	
2022	European Championships	Munich, Germany	2nd	4 × 400 m relay	3:21.68	SB
2023	World Championships	Budapest, Hungary	2nd	400 m	49.57	
2023	World Championships	Budapest, Hungary	6th	4 × 400 m relay	3:24.93	
2024	World Relays	Nassau, Bahamas	6th (h)	4 × 400 m mixed	3:13.53	(Note: Time from the heats; The Polish team did not start in the final.)
2024	World Relays	Nassau, Bahamas	2nd	4 × 400 m relay	3:24.71	
2024	European Championships	Rome, Italy	1st	400 m	48.98	NR
2024	European Championships	Rome, Italy	6th	4 × 400 m relay	3:23.91	
2024	Olympic Games	Paris, France	3rd	400 m	48.98	
2025	World Relays	Guangzhou, China	7th (heats)	4 × 400 m mixed	3:12.70	
2025	World Relays	Guangzhou, China	3rd (repechage)	4 × 400 m relay	3:24.56	(Note: Time from the repechage round; The Polish team did not qualify for the final and competed in the repechage round instead.)
2025	European Team Championships, First Division	Madrid, Spain	2nd	400 m	50.14	SB
2025	European Team Championships, First Division	Madrid, Spain	1st	4 × 400 m mixed	3:09.43	CR, NR, WL
2025	World Championships	Tokyo, Japan	4th	4 × 400 m mixed	3:10.63	
2025	World Championships	Tokyo, Japan	4th	400 m	49.27	SB
2025	World Championships	Tokyo, Japan	5th	4 × 400 m relay	3:22.91	SB
2026	World Indoor Championships	Toruń, Poland	2nd	400 m	50.83	=NR
2026	World Indoor Championships	Toruń, Poland	4th	4 × 400 m relay	3:26.17	
2026	World Relays	Gaborone, Botswana	4th (heats)	4 × 400 m mixed	3:13.00	
2026	World Relays	Gaborone, Botswana	3rd (repechage)	4 × 400 m relay	3:24.56	
2026	European Championships	Birmingham, United Kingdom	2nd	400 m	50.04	
2026	European Championships	Birmingham, United Kingdom	4th	4 × 400 m mixed	3:12.07	
2026	World Ultimate Championship	Budapest, Hungary	10th (h)	400 m	50.40	
