= Roxana Gómez =

Cuban sprinter (born 1999)

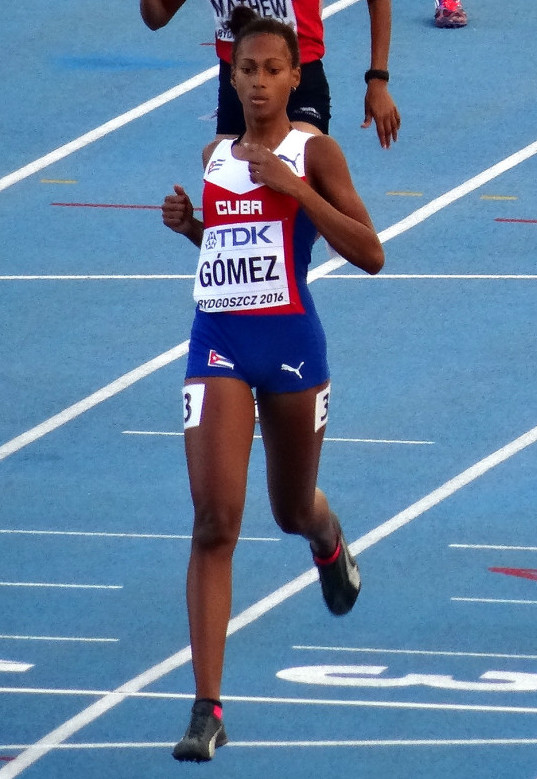
- Gómez in 2016

Personal information
- Full name: Roxana Gómez Calderón
- Born: 7 January 1999 (age 27) Cienfuegos, Cuba
- Height: 170 cm (5 ft 7 in)

Sport
- Country: Cuba
- Sport: Track and field
- Event: Sprint

Achievements and titles
- Personal best: 400 m: 49.71 (2021)
Medal record
Women's athletics
Representing Cuba
World Relays
Gold medal – first place	2021 Chorzów	4×400 m
- Updated on 4 August 2021

Roxana Gómez Calderón (born January 7, 1999) is a Cuban sprinter. She was a member of the national team in the 4×400 metres relay race at the 2016 Summer Olympics. She competed at the 2020 Summer Olympics.

== International competitions ==
Year	Competition	Venue	Position	Event	Notes
Representing Cuba
2015	World Youth Championships	Cali, Colombia	5th	400 m	52.79
2015	Pan American Junior Championships	Edmonton, Canada	6th	400 m	54.80
2016	World U20 Championships	Bydgoszcz, Poland	6th	400 m	52.24
2016	Olympic Games	Rio de Janeiro, Brazil	15th (h)	4 × 400 m	3:30.11
2017	Pan American U20 Championships	Trujillo, Peru	1st	400 m	51.46
2017	World Championships	London, United Kingdom	17th (sf)	400 m	52.01
2018	World U20 Championships	Tampere, Finland	9th (sf)	400 m	53.26
2018	Central American and Caribbean Games	Barranquilla, Colombia	1st	4 × 400 m	3:29.48
2019	Pan American Games	Lima, Peru	4th	400 m	51.65
2019	Pan American Games	Lima, Peru	4th	4 × 400 m	3:30.89
2019	World Championships	Doha, Qatar	12th (sf)	400 m	51.56
2019	World Championships	Doha, Qatar	13th (h)	4 × 400 m	3:29.84
2021	World Relays	Chorzów, Poland	1st	4 × 400 m	3:28.41
2021	Olympic Games	Tokyo, Japan	5th (sf)	400 m	49.71^{1}
2022	World Indoor Championships	Belgrade, Serbia	10th (sf)	400 m	52.28
2022	Ibero-American Championships	La Nucía, Spain	3rd	400 m	51.03
2022	World Championships	Eugene, United States	13th (sf)	400 m	51.12
2022	NACAC Championships	Freeport, Bahamas	4th	400 m	51.31
2023	ALBA Games	Caracas, Venezuela	1st	400 m	50.73
2023	ALBA Games	Caracas, Venezuela	1st	4 × 400 m	3:33.37
2023	Central American and Caribbean Games	San Salvador, El Salvador	2nd	400 m	51.23
2023	Central American and Caribbean Games	San Salvador, El Salvador	1st	4 × 400 m	3:26.08
2023	World Championships	Budapest, Hungary	13th (sf)	400 m	51.07
2023	World Championships	Budapest, Hungary	13th (h)	4 × 400 m	3:29.70
2024	Olympic Games	Paris, France	11th (sf)	400 m	50.48
2024	Olympic Games	Paris, France	16th (h)	4 × 400 m relay	3:33.99
2025	World Championships	Tokyo, Japan	6th	400 m	49.48
2026	Central American and Caribbean Games	Santo Domingo, Dominican Republic	2nd	400 m	49.99
2026	World Ultimate Championship	Budapest, Hungary	7th	400 m	50.21

^{1}Did not finish in the final
