= Stacey-Ann Williams =

Jamaican sprinter (born 1999)

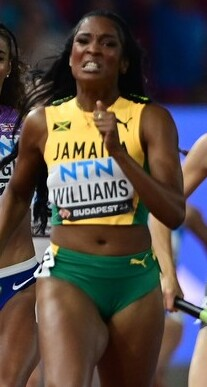
- Williams in 2023

Personal information
- Nationality: Jamaican
- Born: 8 March 1999 (age 27)

Sport
- Sport: Athletics
- Event: 400 metres
- College team: Texas Longhorns
- Club: Elite Performance; Hurdles & Mechanics
- Coached by: Reynaldo Walcott; Boogie Johnson

Achievements and titles
- Personal bests: 200 m: 22.87 (USA, 2025); 300 m: 35.92 NR (USA, 2026); 400 m: 49.48 (Zagreb, 2026)
Medal record
Women's athletics
Representing Jamaica
Olympic Games
Bronze medal – third place	2020 Tokyo	4×400 m relay
World Championships
Silver medal – second place	2022 Eugene	4×400 m relay
Silver medal – second place	2023 Budapest	4×400 m relay
Silver medal – second place	2025 Tokyo	4 × 400 m relay
World U20 Championships
Silver medal – second place	2016 Bydgoszcz	4×400 m relay
Bronze medal – third place	2018 Tampere	4×400 m relay
NACAC Championships
Gold medal – first place	2025 Nassau	Mixed 4×400 m relay
Carifta Games Youth (U18)
Gold medal – first place	2016 St. George's	400 m
Gold medal – first place	2016 St. George's	4×400 m relay

Stacey-Ann Williams (born 8 March 1999) is a Jamaican athlete who runs the 400 metres. She competed in the mixed 4 × 400 metres relay event at the 2020 Summer Olympics and winning a bronze medal in the women's 4 × 400 metres relay event.

== Early life ==
Stacey is from St. Elizabeth, Jamaica, and attended St. Elizabeth Technical High School, where she began her athletics journey.

== Career ==
"In February 2025, Stacey-Ann ran a personal best of 51.31 seconds in the indoor 400m at the Tyson Invitational in the USA, improving her previous indoor best of 51.49 seconds and ranking sixth all-time among Jamaican athletes."

At the 2025 World Athletics Championships in Tokyo, Japan in September, she ran a personal best in the semifinal of the 400 metres 49.59, but did not advance to the final.

At the 2026 Shanghai Diamond League stop, she ran 50.58 for 4th in the 400m. To close the season, she finished 7th (50.52) in semifinal two at the inaugural 2026 World Athletics Ultimate Championship - Women's 400 metres in Budapest, Hungary.

== Personal life ==
She is in a relationship with Jamaican hurdler Rasheed Broadbell.

== Statistics ==
Grand Slam Track results
Slam	Race group	Event	Pl.	Time	Prize money
2025 Kingston Slam	Long sprints	200 m	7th	23.35	US$15,000
2025 Kingston Slam	Long sprints	400 m	5th	50.37	US$15,000
2025 Miami Slam	Long sprints	400 m	6th	50.76	US$15,000
2025 Miami Slam	Long sprints	200 m	7th	22.98	US$15,000
