= 2019 European Athletics U23 Championships – Women's 400 metres =

The women's 400 metres event at the 2019 European Athletics U23 Championships was held in Gävle, Sweden, at Gavlehov Stadium Park on 12 and 13 July.

== Medalists ==
Gold	Silver	Bronze
Natalia Kaczmarek; Poland	Lada Vondrová; Czech Republic	Andrea Miklos; Romania

== Results ==
=== Heats ===
Qualification: First 2 in each heat (Q) and next 2 fastest (q) qualified for the final.

Rank	Heat	Name	Nationality	Time	Notes
1	3	Lada Vondrová	Czech Republic	52.61	Q
2	1	Luna Bulmahn	Germany	52.72	Q, PB
3	3	Nelly Schmidt	Germany	52.99	Q
4	2	Natalia Kaczmarek	Poland	53.11	Q
5	1	Anastasiya Bryzhina	Ukraine	53.26	Q
6	1	Sharlene Mawdsley	Ireland	53.28	q
7	2	Andrea Miklos	Romania	53.42	Q
8	2	Rebecca Borga	Italy	53.51	q
9	3	Sophie Becker	Ireland	53.67	PB
10	3	Kalyl Amaro	France	54.00	
11	3	Natalya Pyrozhenko-Chornomaz	Ukraine	54.64	
12	2	Lily Beckford	Great Britain	54.65	
13	1	Krystsina Muliarchik	Belarus	54.80	SB
14	2	Ivanna Avramchuk	Ukraine	55.10	
15	2	Kalliopi Kountouri	Cyprus	55.44	
16	1	Aurora Casagrande Montesi	Italy	55.61	
17	3	Janet Richard	Malta	55.67	SB
18	1	Simona Malatincová	Slovakia	56.85	
19	3	Rita Hajdini	Kosovo	1:00.49	PB
	1	Diana Iscaye	France	DQ	R163.3 (a)

=== Final ===
Rank	Lane	Name	Nationality	Time	Notes
1st place, gold medalist(s)	5	Natalia Kaczmarek	Poland	52.34	PB
2nd place, silver medalist(s)	4	Lada Vondrová	Czech Republic	52.40	
3rd place, bronze medalist(s)	7	Andrea Miklos	Romania	52.66	SB
4	3	Luna Bulmahn	Germany	52.94	
5	6	Nelly Schmidt	Germany	53.16	
6	8	Anastasiya Bryzhina	Ukraine	53.20	
7	1	Sharlene Mawdsley	Ireland	53.57	
8	2	Rebecca Borga	Italy	53.64	
