= Kendra Clarke =

Canadian sprinter (born 1996)

Personal information
- Born: November 16, 1996 (age 29) Edmonton, Alberta
- Height: 167 cm (5 ft 5 1/2 in)
- Weight: 56 kg (123 lb)

Sport
- Country: Canada
- Sport: Athletics
- Event: Sprints
- Coached by: Lennox Graham, Dwight Francis

Achievements and titles
- Personal best: 400m: 52.19

Kendra Clarke (born November 16, 1996, in Edmonton, Alberta) is a Canadian track and field athlete competing in the sprint events, predominantly the 400m event.

In July 2016, she was officially named to Canada's Olympic team.
