= Lynna Irby =

American sprinter (born 1998)

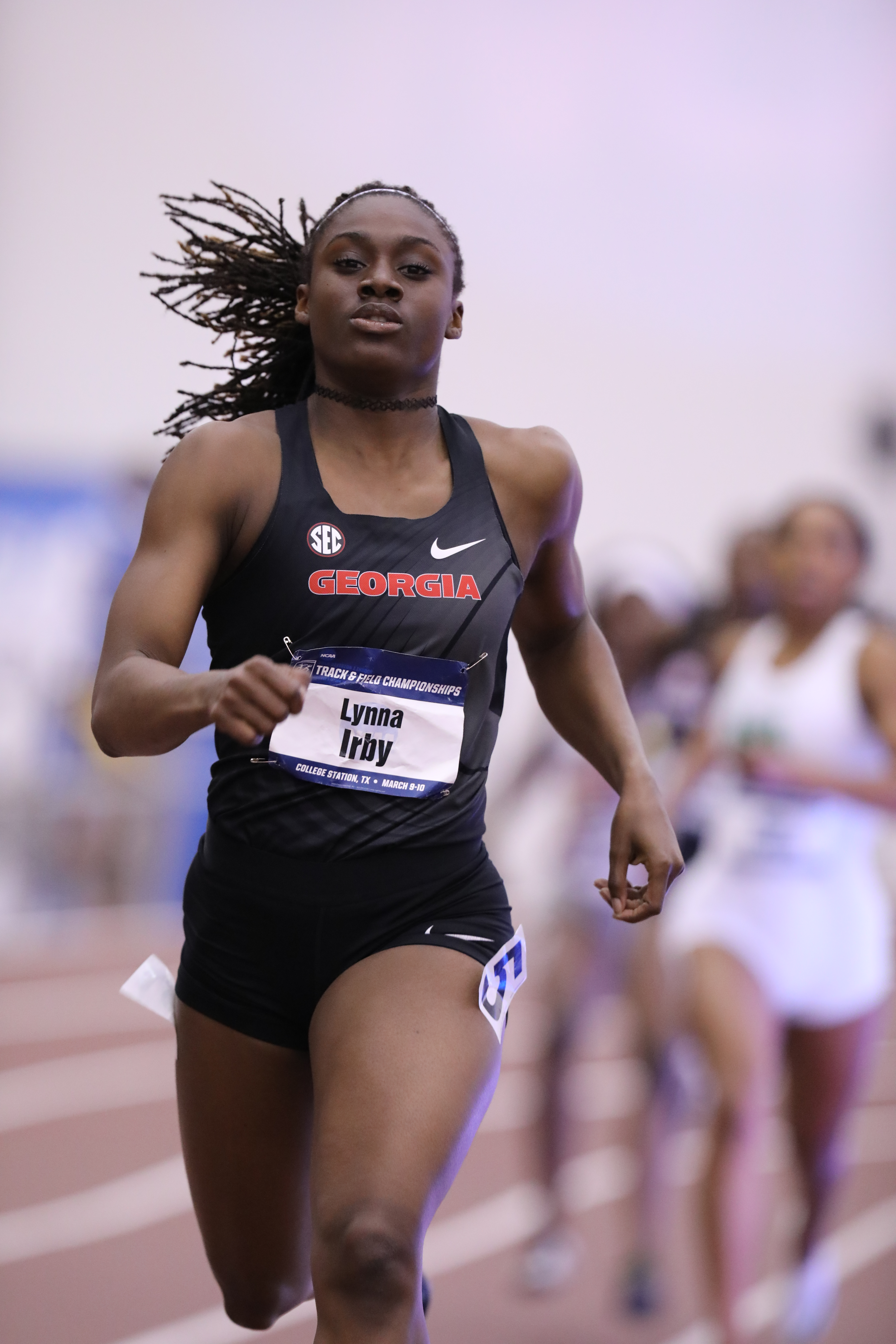
- Irby in 2018

Personal information
- Full name: Lynna Irby-Jackson
- Born: December 6, 1998 (age 27)

Sport
- Country: United States
- Sport: Track and field
- Event: Sprint
- College team: Georgia Bulldogs
- Club: adidas

Achievements and titles
- Personal bests: Outdoor; 100 m: 11.18 (2022); 200 m: 22.25 (2018); 400 m: 49.80 (2018); Indoor; 60 m: 7.25i (2024); 200 m: 22.55i (2018); 400 m: 50.62i (2018)
Medal record
Women's athletics
Representing the United States
Olympic Games
Gold medal – first place	2020 Tokyo	4 × 400 m relay
Bronze medal – third place	2020 Tokyo	4 × 400 m mixed
World Championships
Gold medal – first place	2025 Tokyo	4 × 400 m relay
Gold medal – first place	2025 Tokyo	4 × 400 m mixed
World Relays
Gold medal – first place	2024 Nassau	4 × 400 m mixed
Gold medal – first place	2025 Guangzhou	4 × 400 m mixed
Pan American Games
Gold medal – first place	2019 Lima	4 × 400 m
Bronze medal – third place	2019 Lima	4 × 100 m
NACAC Championships
Bronze medal – third place	2025 Freeport	400 m
World Junior Championships
Gold medal – first place	2016 Bydgoszcz	4 × 100 m
Gold medal – first place	2016 Bydgoszcz	4 × 400 m
Silver medal – second place	2016 Bydgoszcz	400 m
World Youth Championships
Gold medal – first place	2015 Cali	4 × 400 m mixed
Silver medal – second place	2015 Cali	400 m
- Updated on 16 June 2021

Lynna Irby-Jackson (born December 6, 1998) is an American track and field sprinter who competes in the 100 m, 200 m, and 400 m dash events. At the 400 m dash, she set an all-time world record at the age of 12 running 54.57 before becoming the fastest American 400 m high school runner in the last 20 years. She gained 16 national titles from Jr Olympic and Youth National meets. Irby has won silver medals in the event at both the 2015 World Youth Championships and the 2016 World Junior Championships.

== Career ==
Irby started running track at the age of nine for the Indiana Storm Track Club. She attended Pike High School, where she won Gatorade Player of the year for the state of Indiana in 2015 and in 2016. She was also awarded the 2016 Indiana Sports Award presented by the Indianapolis Star newspaper, and earned Pike High School's MVP 3 years straight. Irby led her high school team to runner up at the state meet her Freshman year earning 30 individual points. Her sophomore year Irby again earned 30 individual points plus anchored the 4 × 400 team securing the state championship win for Pike. Irby's Junior year at Pike HS, she once again earned 30 individual points and anchored on the 4 × 400 but it wasn't enough to beat the Lady Warriors of Warren Central High School.

She gained 16 national titles from Jr Olympic and Youth National meets and made world teams for the 2015 World Youth Championships and the 2016 World U20 Championships. While representing USA, Irby got the silver in the 400 meters running 51.79 (U18 – 2015) and 51.39 (U20 – 2016). She also ran on the 4 × 400 relay both years winning gold and in the 4 × 100 prelim (U20 – 2016) also winning gold.

Irby took several AP and Honor courses while in High School and maintained a high GPA. Nationally the Class of 2017 has many top track and field recruits such as Katia Seymour, Lauren Rain Williams (100 m runners), Lauryn Ghee, Jayla Kirkland (200 m runners), and Sydney McLaughlin (400 M-Hurdler), Sammy Watson (800 m runner). Irby was listed in all 3 sprints as one of the top recruits but the absolute top recruit in the 400 m of this national graduating class by Milesplit.

Irby is 45–0 in the state of Indiana postseason having won 9 individual state titles in all sprints. Olympic Gold Medalist Maicel Malone finished her North Central HS track career with 11–12 individual state titles in the 1980s. Irby finished with 12–12 by the end of her Pike high school career in 2017 by sweeping all 3 sprints all 4 years of high school, becoming the first one to ever sweep all 3 sprints all 4 years of high school. Irby owns the Indiana indoor state record in the 60 m with a Personal Best of 7.46 (2016) and the 100 m outdoor record at 11.41 (2017).

== Achievements ==
=== International competitions ===
Year	Competition	Venue	Position	Event	Notes
Representing the United States
2015	World Youth Championships	Cali, Colombia	2nd	400 m	51.79 PB
2015	World Youth Championships	Cali, Colombia	1st	4 × 400 m mixed	3:19.54
2016	World Junior Championships	Bydgoszcz, Poland	2nd	400 m	51.39 PB
2016	World Junior Championships	Bydgoszcz, Poland	1st	4 × 100 m	44.31 (Note: Time from the heats; Irby was replaced in the final.)
2016	World Junior Championships	Bydgoszcz, Poland	1st	4 × 400 m	3:29.11 WJL
2019	Pan American Games	Lima, Peru	(heats)	200 m	23.93
2019	Pan American Games	Lima, Peru	3rd	4 × 100 m	43.39
2019	Pan American Games	Lima, Peru	1st	4 × 400 m	3:26.46
2021	Olympic Games	Tokyo, Japan	1st (h)	4 × 400 m	3:20.86
2022	World Indoor Championships	Belgrade, Serbia	15th (h)	400 m	52.78
2022	World Indoor Championships	Belgrade, Serbia	4th	4 × 400 m	3:28.63
2022	World Championships	Eugene, United States	12th (sf)	400 m	51.00
2023	World Championships	Budapest, Hungary	8th (sf)	400 m	50.71
2023	World Championships	Budapest, Hungary	–	4 × 400 m relay	DQ
2024	World Relays	Nassau, Bahamas	1st	4 × 400 m mixed	3:10.73
2025	World Relays	Guangzhou, China	1st	4 × 400 m mixed	3:09.54
2025	NACAC Championships	Freeport, Bahamas	3rd	400 m	50.47
2025	World Championships	Tokyo, Japan	1st	4 × 400 m mixed	3:08.80 =CR
2025	World Championships	Tokyo, Japan	1st	4 × 400 m relay	3:16.61 CR

=== National competitions ===
Year	Competition	Position	Event	Time
2014	IHSAA Indiana State Track & Field Championships	1st	400 m	54.38
2014	IHSAA Indiana State Track & Field Championships	1st	200 m	24.07
2014	IHSAA Indiana State Track & Field Championships	1st	100 m	11.61
2015	IHSAA Indiana State Track & Field Championships	1st	400 m	54.96
2015	IHSAA Indiana State Track & Field Championships	1st	200 m	24.23
2015	IHSAA Indiana State Track & Field Championships	1st	100 m	11.68
2016	IHSAA Indiana State Track & Field Championships	1st	400 m	53.71
2016	IHSAA Indiana State Track & Field Championships	1st	200 m	23.53
2016	IHSAA Indiana State Track & Field Championships	1st	100 m	11.50
2017	IHSAA Indiana State Track & Field Championships	1st	400 m	54.81
2017	IHSAA Indiana State Track & Field Championships	1st	200 m	23.41
2017	IHSAA Indiana State Track & Field Championships	1st	100 m	11.41
2018	NCAA Div 1 Indoor Track & Field Championships	3rd	400 m	50.87
2018	NCAA Div 1 Indoor Track & Field Championships	3rd	200 m	22.55
2018	NCAA Div 1 Outdoor Track & Field Championships	1st	400 m	49.80
2018	NCAA Div 1 Outdoor Track & Field Championships	3rd	200 m	22.92
