= Andrea Miklós =

Romanian sprinter

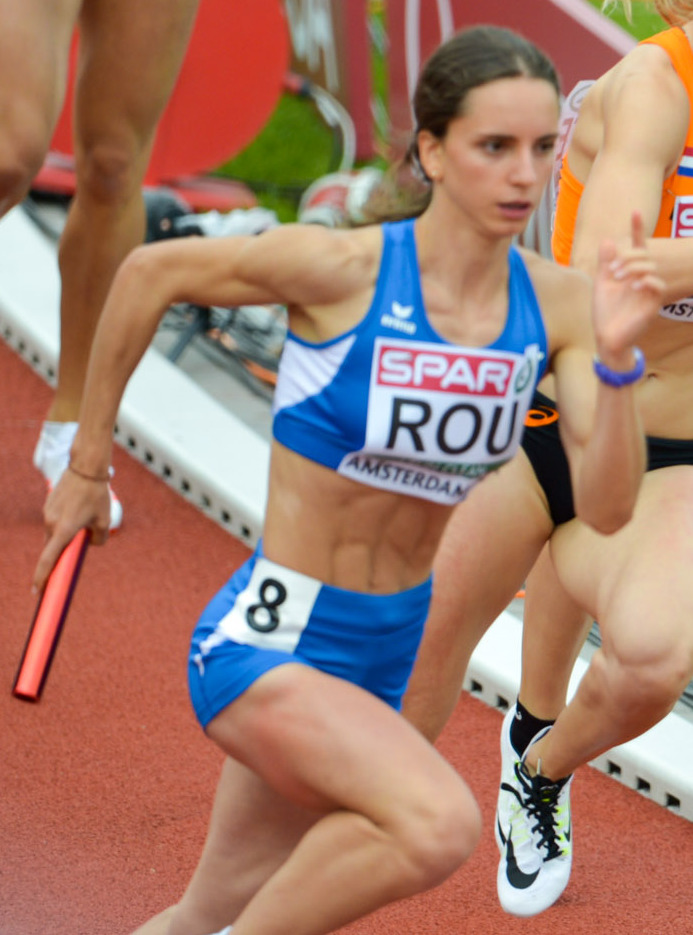

Personal information
- Born: 17 April 1999 (age 27) Cluj-Napoca, Romania
- Height: 1.65 m (5 ft 5 in)
- Weight: 51 kg (112 lb)

Sport
- Sport: Track and field
- Event: 400 metres
- Club: CSS Viitorul Cluj Napoca
Medal record
Women's athletics
Representing Romania
World Indoor Championships
Bronze medal – third place	2016 Portland	4×400 m relay
European Games
Bronze medal – third place	2023 Kraków-Małopolska	400 m
European Youth Championships
Gold medal – first place	2016 Tbilisi	400 m

Andrea Miklós (born 17 April 1999) is a Romanian sprinter specialising in the 400 metres. She competed in the 4 × 400 metres relay at the 2016 IAAF World Indoor Championships winning a bronze medal. Her personal bests in the 400 metres are 50.54 seconds outdoors (Paris, 2024) and 53.82 seconds indoors (Istanbul 2016).

== Competition record ==
Year	Competition	Venue	Position	Event	Notes
Representing Romania
2015	World Youth Championships	Cali, Colombia	7th	400 m	53.29
2015	European Youth Olympic Festival	Tbilisi, Georgia	1st	400 m	53.68
2016	World Indoor Championships	Portland, United States	3rd	4 × 400 m relay	3:31.51
2016	European Championships	Amsterdam, Netherlands	8th	4 × 400 m relay	3:30.63
2016	European Youth Championships	Tbilisi, Georgia	1st	400 m	52.70
2016	Olympic Games	Rio de Janeiro, Brazil	14th (h)	4 × 400 m relay	3:29.87
2018	European Championships	Berlin, Germany	23rd (sf)	400 m	52.49
2018	European Championships	Berlin, Germany	7th	4 × 400 m relay	3:32.15
2019	European Indoor Championships	Glasgow, United Kingdom	31st (h)	400 m	53.87
2019	European U23 Championships	Gävle, Sweden	3rd	400 m	52.66
2019	European U23 Championships	Gävle, Sweden	13th (h)	4 × 100 m relay	45.96
2021	European Indoor Championships	Toruń, Poland	6th	400 m	52.10
2023	World Championships	Budapest, Hungary	10th (sf)	400 m	50.77
2024	World Indoor Championships	Glasgow, United Kingdom	7th (sf)	400 m	51.83
2024	European Championships	Rome, Italy	5th	400 m	50.71
2024	Olympic Games	Paris, France	15th (sf)	400 m	50.78
2025	World Championships	Tokyo, Japan	18th (sf)	400 m	50.90
