= Hannah Williams (athlete) =

British sprinter

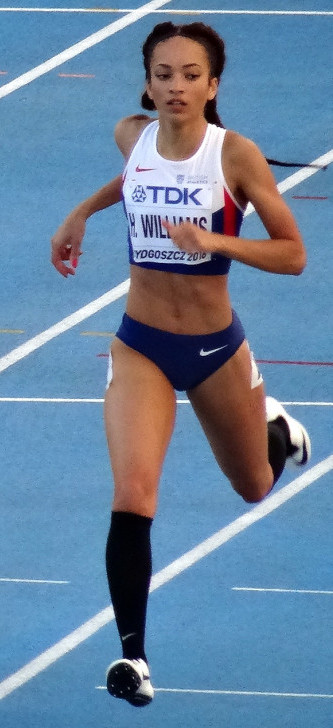
- Hannah Williams in 2016

Personal information
- Nationality: British
- Born: 23 April 1998 (age 28)

Sport
- Sport: Athletics
- Event: Sprinting
Medal record
World Indoor Championships
Bronze medal – third place	2018 Birmingham	4×400 m

Hannah Williams (born 23 April 1998) is a British track and field athlete. She won the bronze medal in the women's 4 × 400 metres relay at the 2018 IAAF World Indoor Championships.

She became British champion when winning the 200 metres event at the 2020 British Athletics Championships in a time of 23.83 secs. Her sister Jodie Williams is a two time British champion.
