= Natassha McDonald =

Canadian sprinter (born 1997)

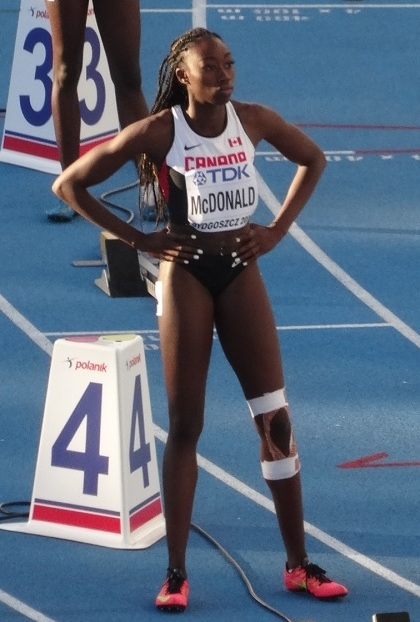
- Natassha McDonald in 2016

Personal information
- Born: 27 January 1997 (age 29) Mississauga, Ontario, Canada

Sport
- Sport: Sprinting
- Event: 4 × 400 metres
Medal record
Representing Canada
Commonwealth Games
Gold medal – first place	2022 Birmingham	4×400 m relay
Pan American Games
Silver medal – second place	2019 Lima	4×400 m relay

Natassha McDonald (born 27 January 1997) is a Canadian sprinter. She competed in the women's 4 × 400 metres relay at the 2017 World Championships in Athletics. She competed at the 2020 Summer Olympics.
