= 2016 IAAF World U20 Championships =

16th edition of global athletics tournament for under-20 athletes

2016 World U20 Championships in Athletics
- Host city: Bydgoszcz, Poland
- Nations: 140
- Athletes: 1359
- Events: 44
- Dates: 19–24 July
- Opened by: Andrzej Duda
- Main venue: Zdzisław Krzyszkowiak Stadium

The 2016 World U20 Championships in Athletics was an international athletics competition for athletes qualifying as juniors (born no earlier than 1 January 1997) which was held at Zdzisław Krzyszkowiak Stadium in Bydgoszcz, Poland on 19–24 July 2016. It was the first time the competition had been held under the new name, having previously been known as World Junior Championships in Athletics.

The championships were originally awarded to Kazan, Russia before the hosting rights were withdrawn as a result of ARAF being suspended by the IAAF. Since then, three cities expressed an interest in hosting the championships; on 7 January 2016, the decision was made to reallocate the championships to Bydgoszcz as it was the only city to submit a bid.

The medal table was topped by the United States with 11 gold, 6 silver, and 4 bronze medals, followed by Kenya and Ethiopia.

== Men's results ==
=== Track ===
Event	Gold		Silver		Bronze	
100 m	Noah Lyles; United States	10.17	Filippo Tortu; Italy	10.24	Mario Burke; Barbados	10.26
200 m	Michael Norman; United States	20.17; CR	Tlotliso Leotlela; South Africa	20.59	Nigel Ellis; Jamaica	20.63
400 m	Abdelalelah Haroun; Qatar	44.81; SB	Wilbert London; United States	45.27; PB	Karabo Sibanda; Botswana	45.45
800 m	Kipyegon Bett; Kenya	1:44.95; SB	Willy Tarbei; Kenya	1:45.50	Mostafa Smaili; Morocco	1:46.02
1500 m	Kumari Taki; Kenya	3:48.63	Taresa Tolosa; Ethiopia	3:48.77	Anthony Kiptoo; Kenya	3:49.00
5000 m	Selemon Barega; Ethiopia	13:21.21; PB	Djamal Direh; Djibouti	13:21.50; NJR	Wesley Ledama; Kenya	13:23.34; PB
10,000 m	Rodgers Kwemoi; Kenya	27:25.23; CR	Aron Kifle; Eritrea	27:26.20; NJR	Jacob Kiplimo; Uganda	27:26.68; PB
110 m hurdles (99.0 cm)	Marcus Krah; United States	13.25; PB	Amere Lattin; United States	13.30; PB	Takumu Furuya; Japan	13.31; AJR
400 m hurdles	Jaheel Hyde; Jamaica	49.03	Taylor McLaughlin; United States	49.45; PB	Kyron McMaster; British Virgin Islands	49.56; NJR
3000 m steeplechase	Amos Kirui; Kenya	8:20.43; WJL	Yemane Haileselassie; Eritrea	8:22.67	Getnet Wale; Ethiopia	8:22.83; PB
4 × 100 m relay	United States; Michael Norman; Hakim Montgomery; Brandon Taylor; Noah Lyles	38.93; WJL	Japan; Ippei Takeda; Jun Yamashita; Wataru Inuzuka; Kenta Oshima	39.01; AJR	Germany; Roger Gurski; Thomas Barthel; Niels Torben Giese; Manuel Eitel	39.13; AJR
4 × 400 m relay	United States; Champion Allison; Ari Cogdell; Kahmari Montgomery; Wilbert London III	3:02:39; WJL	Botswana; Omphemetse Poo; Baboloki Thebe; Karabo Sibanda; Xholani Talane	3:02:81; AJR	Jamaica; Anthony Carpenter; Sean Bailey; Terry Ricardo Thomas; Christopher Taylor	3:04:83; SB
10,000 m walk	Callum Wilkinson; Great Britain	40:41.62; WJL	Jhonatan Amores; Ecuador	40:43.33; PB	Salih Korkmaz; Turkey	40:45.53; NUR

- (World Junior Leader ) -(Championship Record) -( Area Junior Record )- (National Junior Record )( Personal Best)- (Season Best )

=== Field ===
Event	Gold		Silver		Bronze	
High jump	Luis Zayas; Cuba	2.27; WJL	Darius Carbin; United States	2.25; PB	Mohamat Allamine Hamdi; Qatar	2.23; PB
Pole vault	Deakin Volz; United States	5.65; PB	Kurtis Marschall; Australia	5.55	Armand Duplantis; Sweden	5.45
Long jump	Maykel Massó; Cuba	8.00	Miltiadis Tentoglou; Greece	7.91	Darcy Roper; Australia	7.88; SB
Triple jump	Lázaro Martínez; Cuba	17.06; WJL	Cristian Nápoles; Cuba	16.62	Melvin Raffin; France	16.37
Shot put (6 kg)	Bronson Osborn; United States	21.27; PB	Wictor Petersson; Sweden	20.65; PB	Adrian Piperi; United States	20.62; PB
Discus throw (1.750 kg)	Mohamed Ibrahim Moaaz; Qatar	63.63; NJR	Oskar Stachnik; Poland	62.83; PB	Hleb Zhuk; Belarus	61.70; PB
Hammer throw (6 kg)	Bence Halász; Hungary	80.93	Hlib Piskunov; Ukraine	79.58; PB	Aleksi Jaakkola; Finland	77.88
Javelin throw	Neeraj Chopra; India	86.48; WJR	Johan Grobler; South Africa	80.59; PB	Anderson Peters; Grenada	79.65; NJR
Decathlon (junior)	Niklas Kaul; Germany	8162; WJR	Maksim Andraloits; Belarus	8046; NJR	Johannes Erm; Estonia	7879; NJR

- ( World Junior Record ) -(World Junior Leader) - (National Junior Record )-- (National Junior Record )-( Personal Best)- (Season Best )

== Women's results ==
=== Track ===
Event	Gold		Silver		Bronze	
100 m	Candace Hill; United States	11.07; CR	Ewa Swoboda; Poland	11.12; NJR	Khalifa St. Fort; Trinidad and Tobago	11.18
200 m	Edidiong Odiong; Bahrain	22.84; NJR	Evelyn Rivera; Colombia	23.21; PB	Estelle Raffai; France	23.48
400 m	Tiffany James; Jamaica	51.32; WJL	Lynna Irby; United States	51.39; PB	Junelle Bromfield; Jamaica	52.05
800 m	Samantha Watson; United States	2:04.52	Aaliyah Miller; United States	2:05.06	Tigist Ketema; Ethiopia	2:05.13
1500 m	Adanech Anbesa; Ethiopia	4:08.07	Fantu Worku; Ethiopia	4:08.43	Christina Aragon; United States	4:08.71; PB
3000 m	Beyenu Degefa; Ethiopia	8:41.76; CR	Dalila Abdulkadir Gosa; Bahrain	8:46.42; NUR	Konstanze Klosterhalfen; Germany	8:46.74; NUR
5000 m	Kalkidan Fentie; Ethiopia	15:29.64; PB	Emmaculate Chepkirui; Kenya	15:31.12; PB	Bontu Rebitu; Bahrain	15:31.93
100 m hurdles	Elvira Herman; Belarus	12.85; CR	Rushelle Burton; Jamaica	12.87; NJR	Tia Jones; United States	12.89
400 m hurdles	Anna Cockrell; United States	55.20; PB	Shannon Kalawan; Jamaica	56.54	Xahria Santiago; Canada	56.90; SB
3000 m steeplechase	Celliphine Chepteek Chespol; Kenya	9:25.15; CR	Tigist Getnet; Bahrain	9:34.08	Agrie Belachew; Ethiopia	9:37.17; PB
4 × 100 m relay	United States; Tia Jones; Taylor Bennett; Kaylor Harris; Candace Hill	43.69; WJL	France; Tamara Murcia; Cynthia Leduc; Fanny Peltier; Estelle Raffai	44.05	Germany; Katrin Fehm; Keshia Beverly Kwadwo; Eleni Frommann; Chantal Butzek	44.18; SB
4 × 400 m relay	United States; Lynna Irby; Anna Cockrell; Karrington Winters; Samantha Watson	3:29.11; WJL	Jamaica; Shannon Kalawan; Tiffany James; Stacey-Ann Williams; Junelle Bromfield	3:31.01; SB	Canada; Xahria Santiago; Ashlan Best; Natassha McDonald; Victoria Tachinski	3:32.25; NJR
10,000 m walk	Ma Zhenxia; China	45:18.46; WJL	Noemi Stella; Italy	45:23.85; SB	Yehualeye Beletew; Ethiopia	45:33.69; AJR

- WJL ( World Junior Leader ) -(Championship Record) -( Area Junior Record ) - (National Junior Record )- -( Personal Best)- (Season Best )

=== Field ===
Event	Gold		Silver		Bronze	
High jump	Michaela Hrubá; Czech Republic	1.91	Ximena Esquivel; Mexico	1.89	Yuliya Levchenko; Ukraine	1.86
Pole vault	Angelica Moser; Switzerland	4.55; CR	Robeilys Peinado; Venezuela	4.40	Wilma Murto; Finland	4.40
Long jump	Yanis David; France	6.42	Sophie Weissenberg; Germany	6.40	Hilary Kpatcha; France	6.33; PB
Triple jump	Chen Ting; China	13.85; PB	Konstadina Romeou; Greece	13.55; PB	Georgiana Iuliana Anitei; Romania	13.49; SB
Shot put	Alina Kenzel; Germany	17.58; WJL	Song Jiayuan; China	16.36; PB	Alyssa Wilson; United States	16.33
Discus throw	Kristina Rakočević; Montenegro	56.36	Kirsty Williams; Australia	53.91; PB	Alexandra Emilianov; Moldova	53.08
Hammer throw	Beatrice Nedberge Llano; Norway	64.33	Alexandra Hulley; Australia	63.47	Suvi Koskinen; Finland	62.49
Javelin throw	Klaudia Maruszewska; Poland	57.59; PB	Jo-Ane van Dyk; South Africa	57.32; PB	Eda Tuğsuz; Turkey	56.71
Heptathlon	Sarah Lagger; Austria	5960; NUR	Adriana Rodríguez; Cuba	5925; PB	Hanne Maudens; Belgium	5881; PB

- WJL ( World Junior Leader ) -(Championship Record)-- (National Junior Record ) -( Personal Best)- (Season Best )

== Medal table ==
The host country is highlighted in lavender blue

Rank	Nation	Gold	Silver	Bronze	Total
1	United States	12	6	4	22
2	Kenya	5	2	2	9
3	Ethiopia	4	2	4	10
4	Cuba	3	2	0	5
5	Jamaica	2	3	3	8
6	Germany	2	1	3	6
7	China	2	1	0	3
8	Qatar	2	0	1	3
9	Bahrain	1	2	1	4
10	Poland*	1	2	0	3
11	France	1	1	3	5
12	Belarus	1	1	1	3
13	Romania	1	0	1	2
14	Austria	1	0	0	1
14	Czech Republic	1	0	0	1
14	Great Britain	1	0	0	1
14	Hungary	1	0	0	1
14	India	1	0	0	1
14	Montenegro	1	0	0	1
14	Norway	1	0	0	1
14	Switzerland	1	0	0	1
22	Australia	0	3	1	4
23	South Africa	0	3	0	3
24	Eritrea	0	2	0	2
24	Greece	0	2	0	2
24	Italy	0	2	0	2
27	Botswana	0	1	1	2
27	Japan	0	1	1	2
27	Ukraine	0	1	1	2
30	Colombia	0	1	0	1
30	Djibouti	0	1	0	1
30	Ecuador	0	1	0	1
30	Mexico	0	1	0	1
30	Venezuela	0	1	0	1
35	Finland	0	0	3	3
36	Canada	0	0	2	2
36	Sweden	0	0	2	2
36	Turkey	0	0	2	2
39	Barbados	0	0	1	1
39	Belgium	0	0	1	1
39	British Virgin Islands	0	0	1	1
39	Estonia	0	0	1	1
39	Grenada	0	0	1	1
39	Moldova	0	0	1	1
39	Morocco	0	0	1	1
39	Trinidad and Tobago	0	0	1	1
39	Uganda	0	0	1	1
Totals (47 entries)		45	43	45	133

Notes

Updated after Konrad Bukowiecki disqualification in men's shot put.

== Participation ==
- Albania (1)
- Algeria (8)
- Angola (1)
- Antigua and Barbuda (1)
- Argentina (1)
- Armenia (1)
- Aruba (1)
- Australia (53)
- Austria (5)
- Azerbaijan (1)
- Bahamas (13)
- Bahrain (9)
- Barbados (7)
- Belarus (21)
- Belgium (12)
- Bermuda (1)
- Bolivia (2)
- Botswana (9)
- Brazil (13)
- British Virgin Islands (5)
- Bulgaria (4)
- Burkina Faso (1)
- Canada (39)
- Cayman Islands (1)
- Chile (8)
- China (37)
- Chinese Taipei (7)
- Colombia (15)
- Comoros (1)
- Cook Islands (1)
- Costa Rica (1)
- Croatia (9)
- Cuba (14)
- Cyprus (6)
- Czech Republic (25)
- Denmark (3)
- Djibouti (2)
- Dominica (1)
- Dominican Republic (1)
- Ecuador (9)
- Egypt (6)
- Equatorial Guinea (1)
- Eritrea (5)
- Estonia (11)
- Ethiopia (25)
- Finland (19)
- France (41)
- French Polynesia (1)
- Georgia (3)
- Germany (59)
- Gibraltar (1)
- Great Britain (39)
- Greece (15)
- Grenada (3)
- Guam (1)
- Guatemala (5)
- Honduras (1)
- Hong Kong (1)
- Hungary (12)
- Iceland (3)
- India (22)
- Indonesia (1)
- Iran (1)
- Iraq (7)
- Ireland (18)
- Israel (6)
- Italy (50)
- Jamaica (40)
- Japan (43)
- Jordan (1)
- Kazakhstan (7)
- Kenya (26)
- Kosovo (1)
- Kuwait (1)
- Kyrgyzstan (1)
- Latvia (9)
- Lebanon (1)
- Lithuania (8)
- Luxembourg (1)
- Macau (1)
- Macedonia (1)
- Madagascar (1)
- Malaysia (4)
- Malta (1)
- Mexico (11)
- Moldova (4)
- Montenegro (1)
- Morocco (6)
- Netherlands (19)
- New Zealand (14)
- Nicaragua (1)
- Nigeria (9)
- Northern Mariana Islands (1)
- Norway (15)
- Pakistan (1)
- Papua New Guinea (1)
- Paraguay (1)
- Peru (8)
- Philippines (2)
- Poland (45)
- Portugal (12)
- Puerto Rico (9)
- Qatar (6)
- Romania (13)
- Rwanda (5)
- El Salvador (1)
- Samoa (1)
- San Marino (1)
- Saudi Arabia (5)
- Serbia (5)
- Seychelles (2)
- Saint Kitts and Nevis (2)
- Singapore (1)
- Slovakia (4)
- Slovenia (3)
- South Africa (20)
- South Korea (13)
- Spain (35)
- Sri Lanka (3)
- Sudan (1)
- Suriname (1)
- Swaziland (1)
- Sweden (20)
- Switzerland (10)
- Tajikistan (1)
- Thailand (13)
- Tonga (1)
- Trinidad and Tobago (9)
- Tunisia (9)
- Turkey (25)
- Turks and Caicos Islands (1)
- Uganda (7)
- Ukraine (34)
- United Arab Emirates (1)
- United States (79)
- United States Virgin Islands (2)
- Uruguay (1)
- Uzbekistan (2)
- Vanuatu (1)
- Venezuela (6)
