= 2014 World Junior Championships in Athletics – Women's 4 × 400 metres relay =

The women's 4 x 400 metres relay event at the 2014 World Junior Championships in Athletics was held in Eugene, Oregon, USA, at Hayward Field on 26 and 27 July.

== Medalists ==
Gold	Shamier Little; Olivia Baker; Shakima Wimbley; Kendall Baisden; United States
Silver	Shona Richards; Loren Bleaken; Sabrina Bakare; Cheriece Hylton; United Kingdom
Bronze	Laura Müller; Hannah Mergenthaler; Laura Gläsner; Ann-Kathrin Kopf; Germany

== Records ==
Standing records prior to the 2014 World Junior Championships in Athletics
World Junior Record	United States (Alexandria Anderson, Ashlee Kidd, Stephanie Smith, Natasha Hastings)	3:27.60	Grosseto, Italy	18 July 2004
Championship Record	United States (Alexandria Anderson, Ashlee Kidd, Stephanie Smith, Natasha Hastings)	3:27.60	Grosseto, Italy	18 July 2004
World Junior Leading	Cuba	3:36.15	Camagüey, Cuba	9 March 2014
Broken records during the 2014 World Junior Championships in Athletics

== Results ==
=== Final ===
27 July
Start time: 16:31 Temperature: 29 °C Humidity: 35 %

Rank	Name	Nationality	Lane	Reaction Time	Time	Notes
1st place, gold medalist(s)	United States	Shamier Little; Olivia Baker; Shakima Wimbley; Kendall Baisden	3	0.253	3:30.42	WJL
2nd place, silver medalist(s)	United Kingdom	Shona Richards; Loren Bleaken; Sabrina Bakare; Cheriece Hylton	5	0.165	3:32.00	SB
3rd place, bronze medalist(s)	Germany	Laura Müller; Hannah Mergenthaler; Laura Gläsner; Ann-Kathrin Kopf	2	0.205	3:33.02	SB
4	Canada	Taylor Sharpe; Kendra Clarke; Christian Brennan; Madeline Price	6	0.179	3:33.17	NJR
5	Nigeria	Praise Oghenefejiro Idamadudu; Jennifer Adaeze Edobi; Yinka Ajayi; Edidiong Ofonime Odiong	8	0.200	3:35.14	
6	Poland	Natalia Bartosiewicz; Oliwia Pakuła; Aleksandra Szczerbaczewicz; Adrianna Janowicz	7	0.194	3:37.52	SB
7	Australia	Emily Lawson; Georgia Wassall; Georgia Griffith; Samantha Lind	1	0.183	3:39.65	
	Jamaica	Dawnalee Loney; Tiffany James; Asaine Hall; Genekee Leith	4	0.243	DQ	170.19

Note:
IAAF Rule 170.19 - Starting outside the takeover zone

Intermediate times:
400m: 52.28 AUS
800m: 1:45.68 USA
1200m: 2:38.14 USA

=== Heats ===
26 July
First 3 in each heat (Q) and the next 2 fastest (q) advance to the Final

==== Summary ====
Rank	Nation	Time	Notes
1	United States	3:32.73	Q WJL
2	Canada	3:34.88	Q SB
3	Nigeria	3:34.99	Q SB
4	United Kingdom	3:35.37	Q SB
5	Jamaica	3:38.89	Q
6	Australia	3:39.18	q SB
7	Poland	3:39.51	Q SB
8	Germany	3:39.78	q SB
9	Slovenia	3:42.91	NJR
10	Italy	3:43.06	SB
11	France	3:46.68	SB
12	India	3:52.75	
	Czech Republic	DQ	163.5

==== Details ====
First 3 in each heat (Q) and the next 2 fastest (q) advance to the Final

===== Heat 1 =====
27 July
Start time: 15:02 Temperature: 29 °C Humidity: 35%

Rank	Nation	Competitors	Lane	Reaction Time	Time	Notes
1	United Kingdom	Laviai Nielsen; Loren Bleaken; Nikita Campbell-Smith; Sabrina Bakare	4	0.180	3:35.37	Q SB
2	Jamaica	Asaine Hall; Tiffany James; Dawnalee Loney; Yanique McNeil	6	0.238	3:38.89	Q
3	Poland	Karolina Ciesielska; Oliwia Pakuła; Natalia Bartosiewicz; Adrianna Janowicz	3	0.173	3:39.51	Q SB
4	Italy	Ylenia Vitale; Lucia Pasquale; Alessia Baldi; Alice Mangione	5	0.217	3:43.06	SB
5	France	Corane Gazeau; Charlotte Mouchet; Maroussia Paré; Déborah Sananes	7	0.183	3:46.68	SB
6	India	Arachana Ramdas Adhav; Jessy Joseph; Jisha Veendakunnu Velayudhan; Vijayakumari Gowdenahalli Kumara	2	0.207	3:52.75	
	Czech Republic	Helena Jiranová; Dominika Kruparová; Pavla Falharová; Zdenka Seidlová	8	0.195	DQ	163.5

Note:
IAAF Rule 163.5 - Leaving the lane before the breakline

Intermediate times:
400m: 54.02 JAM
800m: 1:47.60 UK
1200m: 2:41.44 UK

===== Heat 2 =====
27 July
Start time: 15:11 Temperature: 30 °C Humidity: 31%

Rank	Nation	Competitors	Lane	Reaction Time	Time	Notes
1	United States	Shakima Wimbley; Felecia Majors; Aaliyah Barnes; Olivia Baker	3	0.327	3:32.73	Q WJL
2	Canada	Taylor Sharpe; Kendra Clarke; Christian Brennan; Madeline Price	7	0.212	3:34.88	Q SB
3	Nigeria	Praise Oghenefejiro Idamadudu; Jennifer Adaeze Edobi; Yinka Ajayi; Edidiong Ofonime Odiong	6	0.207	3:34.99	Q SB
4	Australia	Emily Lawson; Georgia Wassall; Georgia Griffith; Samantha Lind	5	0.187	3:39.18	q SB
5	Germany	Hannah Mergenthaler; Noelya Schonig; Eleni Frommann; Ann-Kathrin Kopf	4	0.232	3:39.78	q SB
6	Slovenia	Maja Pogorevc; Anita Horvat; Aneja Simončič; Julija Praprotnik	2	0.245	3:42.91	NJR

Intermediate times:
400m: 53.09 USA
800m: 1:46.42 USA
1200m: 2:38.84 USA

== Participation ==
According to an unofficial count, 60 athletes from 13 countries participated in the event.

- Australia (4)
- Canada (4)
- Czech Republic (4)
- France (4)
- Germany (6)
- India (4)
- Italy (4)
- Jamaica (5)
- Nigeria (4)
- Poland (5)
- Slovenia (4)
- United Kingdom (6)
- United States (6)
