= 2014 World Junior Championships in Athletics – Women's 400 metres =

The women's 400 metres event at the 2014 World Junior Championships in Athletics was held in Eugene, Oregon, USA, at Hayward Field on 23, 24 and 25 July.

== Medalists ==
Gold	Kendall Baisden; United States
Silver	Gilda Casanova; Cuba
Bronze	Olivia Baker; United States

== Records ==
Standing records prior to the 2014 World Junior Championships in Athletics
World Junior Record	Grit Breuer (GER)	49.42	Tokyo, Japan	27 August 1991
Championship Record	Ashley Spencer (USA)	50.50	Barcelona, Spain	13 July 2012
World Junior Leading	Kendall Baisden (USA)	50.46	Lubbock, United States	18 May 2014
Broken records during the 2014 World Junior Championships in Athletics

== Results ==
=== Final ===
25 July
Start time: 20:29 Temperature: 25 °C Humidity: 41 %

Rank	Name	Nationality	Lane	Reaction Time	Time	Notes
1st place, gold medalist(s)	Kendall Baisden	United States	6	0.250	51.85	
2nd place, silver medalist(s)	Gilda Casanova	Cuba	4	0.207	52.59	
3rd place, bronze medalist(s)	Olivia Baker	United States	3	0.210	53.00	
4	Laura Müller	Germany	8	0.193	53.40	
5	Yana Glotova	Russia	5	0.197	53.63	
6	Edidiong Ofonime Odiong	Nigeria	7	0.335	54.06	
7	Christian Brennan	Canada	1	0.179	54.15	
8	Susanne Walli	Austria	2	0.238	54.61	

=== Semifinals ===
24 July
First 2 in each heat (Q) and the next 2 fastest (q) advance to the Final

==== Summary ====
Rank	Name	Nationality	Time	Notes
1	Gilda Casanova	Cuba	52.45	Q
2	Kendall Baisden	United States	52.52	Q
3	Olivia Baker	United States	53.08	Q
4	Yana Glotova	Russia	53.39	Q
5	Laura Müller	Germany	53.64	Q
6	Edidiong Ofonime Odiong	Nigeria	53.75	Q
7	Christian Brennan	Canada	53.81	q
8	Susanne Walli	Austria	53.94	q PB
9	Ann-Kathrin Kopf	Germany	53.95	
10	Madeline Price	Canada	54.06	
10	Tiffany James	Jamaica	54.06	
12	Adrianna Janowicz	Poland	54.21	
13	Gunta Latiševa-Čudare	Latvia	54.23	
14	Modesta Morauskaitė	Lithuania	54.25	
15	Kateryna Klymiuk	Ukraine	54.63	
16	Maja Pogorevc	Slovenia	54.64	
17	Ylenia Vitale	Italy	54.80	
18	Yanique McNeil	Jamaica	54.98	
19	Helena Jiranová	Czech Republic	55.06	
20	Emily Lawson	Australia	55.33	
21	Melissa Torres	Colombia	55.36	
22	Chelsea Zoller	Switzerland	55.47	
23	Liliya Manasipova	Uzbekistan	56.72	
24	María Simancas	Venezuela	57.10	

==== Details ====
First 2 in each heat (Q) and the next 2 fastest (q) advance to the Final

===== Semifinal 1 =====
25 July
Start time: 19:03 Temperature: 23 °C Humidity: 44%

Rank	Name	Nationality	Lane	Reaction Time	Time	Notes
1	Olivia Baker	United States	6	0.257	53.08	Q
2	Yana Glotova	Russia	4	0.215	53.39	Q
3	Tiffany James	Jamaica	3	0.181	54.06	
4	Kateryna Klymiuk	Ukraine	7	0.195	54.63	
5	Maja Pogorevc	Slovenia	5	0.233	54.64	
6	Emily Lawson	Australia	1	0.195	55.33	
7	Melissa Torres	Colombia	2	0.244	55.36	
8	Liliya Manasipova	Uzbekistan	8	0.314	56.72	

===== Semifinal 2 =====
25 July
Start time: 19:11 Temperature: 22 °C Humidity: 46%

Rank	Name	Nationality	Lane	Reaction Time	Time	Notes
1	Kendall Baisden	United States	4	0.312	52.52	Q
2	Laura Müller	Germany	3	0.177	53.64	Q
3	Madeline Price	Canada	6	0.251	54.06	
4	Gunta Latiševa-Čudare	Latvia	5	0.191	54.23	
5	Ylenia Vitale	Italy	7	0.255	54.80	
6	Yanique McNeil	Jamaica	2	0.181	54.98	
7	Helena Jiranová	Czech Republic	8	0.189	55.06	
8	Chelsea Zoller	Switzerland	1	0.232	55.47	

===== Semifinal 3 =====
25 July
Start time: 19:17 Temperature: 22 °C Humidity: 46%

Rank	Name	Nationality	Lane	Reaction Time	Time	Notes
1	Gilda Casanova	Cuba	5	0.193	52.45	Q
2	Edidiong Ofonime Odiong	Nigeria	4	0.252	53.75	Q
3	Christian Brennan	Canada	8	0.219	53.81	q
4	Susanne Walli	Austria	2	0.259	53.94	q PB
5	Ann-Kathrin Kopf	Germany	3	0.188	53.95	
6	Adrianna Janowicz	Poland	7	0.222	54.21	
7	Modesta Morauskaitė	Lithuania	6	0.249	54.25	
8	María Simancas	Venezuela	1	0.360	57.10	

=== Heats ===
23 July
First 4 in each heat (Q) and the next 4 fastest (q) advance to the Semi-Finals

==== Summary ====
Rank	Name	Nationality	Time	Notes
1	Kendall Baisden	United States	53.28	Q
2	Gilda Casanova	Cuba	53.43	Q
3	Yana Glotova	Russia	53.61	Q
4	Madeline Price	Canada	53.86	Q
5	Olivia Baker	United States	54.09	Q
5	Edidiong Ofonime Odiong	Nigeria	54.09	Q
7	Laura Müller	Germany	54.19	Q
8	Modesta Morauskaitė	Lithuania	54.29	Q
9	Gunta Latiševa-Čudare	Latvia	54.30	Q
10	Kateryna Klymiuk	Ukraine	54.43	Q
11	Helena Jiranová	Czech Republic	54.51	Q
12	Tiffany James	Jamaica	54.58	Q
13	Adrianna Janowicz	Poland	54.70	Q
14	Ann-Kathrin Kopf	Germany	54.71	Q
15	Maja Pogorevc	Slovenia	54.80	Q
16	Melissa Torres	Colombia	54.81	q SB
17	Emily Lawson	Australia	54.83	q
18	Christian Brennan	Canada	54.84	Q
19	Ylenia Vitale	Italy	54.86	Q
20	Susanne Walli	Austria	54.99	q
21	Yanique McNeil	Jamaica	55.01	q
22	Chelsea Zoller	Switzerland	55.12	Q PB
23	Shaquania Dorsett	Bahamas	55.53	
24	Zdenka Seidlová	Czech Republic	55.83	
25	Liliya Manasipova	Uzbekistan	56.00	Q
26	Paola Vázquez	Mexico	56.35	
27	Siti Nur Afiqah Abdul Razak	Malaysia	56.54	
28	María Simancas	Venezuela	56.91	Q
29	Janet Richard	Malta	57.13	
30	Lin Yen-Tong	Chinese Taipei	58.21	
	Kadecia Baird	Guyana	DQ	163.3(a)
	Dora Filipovic	Croatia	DQ	163.3(a)
	Praise Oghenefejiro Idamadudu	Nigeria	DQ	163.3(a)
	Eglay Nafuna Nalyanya	Kenya	DQ	163.3(a)
	Zion Corrales-Nelson	Philippines	DQ	163.3(a)

==== Details ====
First 4 in each heat (Q) and the next 4 fastest (q) advance to the Semi-Finals

===== Heat 1 =====
25 July
Start time: 11:34 Temperature: 16 °C Humidity: 82%

Rank	Name	Nationality	Lane	Reaction Time	Time	Notes
1	Kendall Baisden	United States	4	0.271	53.28	Q
2	Tiffany James	Jamaica	5	0.211	54.58	Q
3	Liliya Manasipova	Uzbekistan	7	0.211	56.00	Q
4	María Simancas	Venezuela	3	0.206	56.91	Q
5	Janet Richard	Malta	6	0.193	57.13	
	Zion Corrales-Nelson	Philippines	2	0.178	DQ	163.3(a)
	Praise Oghenefejiro Idamadudu	Nigeria	8	0.207	DQ	163.3(a)

Note:
IAAF Rule 163.3(a) - Lane infringement

===== Heat 2 =====
25 July
Start time: 11:40 Temperature: 16 °C Humidity: 88%

Rank	Name	Nationality	Lane	Reaction Time	Time	Notes
1	Yana Glotova	Russia	5	0.201	53.61	Q
2	Laura Müller	Germany	2	0.164	54.19	Q
3	Helena Jiranová	Czech Republic	3	0.168	54.51	Q
4	Chelsea Zoller	Switzerland	6	0.209	55.12	Q PB
5	Siti Nur Afiqah Abdul Razak	Malaysia	8	0.239	56.54	
	Kadecia Baird	Guyana	7	0.274	DQ	163.3(a)
	Dora Filipovic	Croatia	4	0.180	DQ	163.3(a)

Note:
IAAF Rule 163.3(a) - Lane infringement

===== Heat 3 =====
25 July
Start time: 11:47 Temperature: 16 °C Humidity: 88%

Rank	Name	Nationality	Lane	Reaction Time	Time	Notes
1	Ann-Kathrin Kopf	Germany	6	0.184	54.71	Q
2	Maja Pogorevc	Slovenia	7	0.307	54.80	Q
3	Christian Brennan	Canada	3	0.160	54.84	Q
4	Ylenia Vitale	Italy	5	0.219	54.86	Q
5	Susanne Walli	Austria	2	0.229	54.99	q
6	Yanique McNeil	Jamaica	8	0.195	55.01	q
7	Lin Yen-Tong	Chinese Taipei	4	0.180	58.21	

===== Heat 4 =====
25 July
Start time: 11:52 Temperature: 16 °C Humidity: 88%

Rank	Name	Nationality	Lane	Reaction Time	Time	Notes
1	Olivia Baker	United States	2	0.263	54.09	Q
2	Modesta Morauskaitė	Lithuania	7	0.260	54.29	Q
3	Gunta Latiševa-Čudare	Latvia	6	0.244	54.30	Q
4	Adrianna Janowicz	Poland	4	0.198	54.70	Q
5	Zdenka Seidlová	Czech Republic	8	0.192	55.83	
6	Paola Vázquez	Mexico	3	0.208	56.35	
	Eglay Nafuna Nalyanya	Kenya	5	0.200	DQ	163.3(a)

Note:
IAAF Rule 163.3(a) - Lane infringement

===== Heat 5 =====
25 July
Start time: 11:57 Temperature: 16 °C Humidity: 88%

Rank	Name	Nationality	Lane	Reaction Time	Time	Notes
1	Gilda Casanova	Cuba	3	0.203	53.43	Q
2	Madeline Price	Canada	7	0.233	53.86	Q
3	Edidiong Ofonime Odiong	Nigeria	4	0.271	54.09	Q
4	Kateryna Klymiuk	Ukraine	2	0.181	54.43	Q
5	Melissa Torres	Colombia	8	0.233	54.81	q SB
6	Emily Lawson	Australia	6	0.193	54.83	q
7	Shaquania Dorsett	Bahamas	5	0.153	55.53	

== Participation ==
According to an unofficial count, 35 athletes from 29 countries participated in the event.

- Australia (1)
- Austria (1)
- Bahamas (1)
- Canada (2)
- Chinese Taipei (1)
- Colombia (1)
- Croatia (1)
- Cuba (1)
- Czech Republic (2)
- Germany (2)
- Guyana (1)
- Italy (1)
- Jamaica (2)
- Kenya (1)
- Latvia (1)
- Lithuania (1)
- Malaysia (1)
- Malta (1)
- Mexico (1)
- Nigeria (2)
- Philippines (1)
- Poland (1)
- Russia (1)
- Slovenia (1)
- Switzerland (1)
- Ukraine (1)
- United States (2)
- Uzbekistan (1)
- Venezuela (1)
