= Kendall Baisden =

American track and field sprinter

Personal information
- Born: March 5, 1995 (age 31) Ann Arbor, Michigan, USA
- Height: 5 ft 11 in (180 cm)
- Weight: 120 lb (54 kg)

Sport
- Sport: Athletics
- University team: University of Texas
Medal record
Women's athletics
Representing United States
Pan American Games
Gold medal – first place	2015 Toronto	400 m
Gold medal – first place	2015 Toronto	4 × 400 m relay
- Updated on September 19, 2015

Kendall Baisden (born March 5, 1995) is an American track and field sprinter who specializes in the 400-meter dash. She holds a personal record of 50.46 seconds for the distance, set in 2014.

She was the double 400 m and 4×400-meter relay champion at both the 2015 Pan American Games and the 2014 World Junior Championships in Athletics. Collegiately she runs for the University of Texas at Austin and has won NCAA relay titles indoors and outdoors.

== Career ==
=== Early life and career ===
Baisden was born in Beverly Hills, Michigan to Tina and Anthony Baisden. She attended Detroit Country Day School and was first interested in playing tennis, looking to follow in the footsteps of Serena Williams. It was during tennis practice that her speed was noticed and the coaches recommended she compete in track and field instead. She ran in a range of sprint distances and at state level won three 400-meter dash and two titles in both the 100-meter dash and 200-meter dash. She quickly showed her skill at the national level, placing in the top three of the 200 m at the 2007 AAU Junior Olympic Games at the age of twelve. A National Junior Olympic double in the short sprints followed in 2009, with her runs of 11.73 seconds and 23.69 seconds being American records for the age group.

Baisden began to progress more in the longer sprint in the 2010, taking the under-16s Junior Olympic title and the national junior title over 400 m. Her time of 52.59 seconds that season placed her among the world's top young sprinters that year. Focusing more on the 400 m in 2011, she was runner-up at the national youth trials and went on to place sixth individually at the 2011 World Youth Championships in Athletics, as well as take her first international medal (a silver) in the sprint medley relay.

Third place at the 2012 USA Junior Championships brought Baisden a place in the relay at the World Junior Championships. At the competition in Barcelona the American team were disqualified in the heats, but were given a second opportunity to qualify after a protest and ultimately a team of Baisden, Erika Rucker, Olivia Ekpone and Ashley Spencer went on to win the gold medals. In 2013, she improved her best to 52.03 seconds while placing second at the national junior championships and later won her first individual international medal at the 2013 Pan American Junior Athletics Championships, coming runner-up behind Courtney Okolo before taking the relay gold with her teammate.

=== College and World Junior champion ===
Baisden enrolled at the University of Texas at Austin in late 2013, majoring in business, and began training with the Texas Longhorns collegiate team. She immediately became a key member of the track team, being a 200 m and 400 m finalist at the Big 12 Conference indoor meet in 2014, and helping Texas to runner-up in the relay at the event. At the 2014 NCAA Division I Indoor Track and Field Championships she ranked fifth in the 400 m and, at 3:27.42 minutes, set the second-fastest-ever indoor 4×400 m relay time for college athletes, although the team of Briana Nelson, Okolo, Baisden and Spencer were beaten by the Oregon Ducks team.

The Big 12 Conference Outdoor Championships saw Baisden score points in four events for Texas: she was a winner in both the 4×100-meter relay and 4×400 m relay, was runner-up in the 400 m, and also fourth in the 200 m. Her time of 50.46 seconds in the 400 m was a personal best and also the fastest by a junior athlete that year. This also marked her rise into a senior standard athlete, as she placed eighth overall on the global rankings for women's 400 m for 2014. In her debut at the competition, Baisden took third place in the 400 m at the 2014 NCAA Division I Outdoor Track and Field Championships, beaten only by teammate Okolo and Phyllis Francis of Oregon. She teamed up with Okolo to help Texas to the 4×400 m relay collegiate title – the time of 3:24.21 minutes set by Nelson, Baisden, Morolake Akinosun and Okolo was a record for the NCAA Division I Women's Outdoor Track and Field Championships and the second-fastest recorded by a collegiate team at that point. It was the eighth fastest time that season by any team. Baisden also teamed up with Akinsun, Okolo and Morgan Snow to claim third in the NCAA 4×100 m relay.

Baisden entered the 2014 USA Outdoor Track and Field Championships, but was disqualified in the first round. She won her first national junior title and followed this with individual and relay gold medals at the 2014 World Junior Championships in Athletics (running with Shamier Little, Olivia Baker and Shakima Wimbley in the relay).

At the start of 2015, she won the Big 12 indoor titles in the 400 m and relay. She sank to eighth in the Big 12 outdoor final, but was also fifth in the 200 m and won both the relay titles. At the 2015 NCAA Division I Indoor Track and Field Championships she won the relay title and ranked twelfth individually. She led the Texas women's sprint team at the 2015 NCAA Division I Outdoor Track and Field Championships, taking runner-up spot in the 400 m behind Kala Funderburk. A team of Melissa Gonzalez, Baisden, Akinosun, and Spencer placed only eighth in the NCAA 4×400 m relay, but Baisden had more success in the 4×100 m, placing fourth alongside Snow, Akinosun, and Shania Collins.

=== Pan American champion ===
After the end of the college season she ran at the 2015 USA Outdoor Track and Field Championships and appeared to be among the top contenders after qualifying for the final with a run of 50.50 seconds. She was over two seconds slower in the final, however, and eventually placed seventh. Still, her performances that year gained her a debut international senior appearance as part of the United States team for the 2015 Pan American Games. With a run of 51.27 seconds in the 400 m final she became the first American champion in the event in 36 years after Sharon Dabney's 1979 win. Baisden teamed up with the individual runner-up Shakima Wimbley, as well as Shamier Little and Kyra Jefferson, to beat the Jamaican women to the 4×400 m relay gold medals.

== Personal records ==
Outdoor

- 100-meter dash – 11.55 (2010)
- 200-meter dash – 22.80 (2015)
- 400-meter dash – 50.46 (2014)

Indoor

- 60-meter dash – 7.39 (2015)
- 200-meter dash – 23.74 (2015)
- 400-meter dash – 52.01 (2014)

== National titles ==
- NCAA Division I Women's Outdoor Track and Field Championships
  - 4 × 400 m relay: 2014
- NCAA Division I Women's Indoor Track and Field Championships
  - 4 × 400 m relay: 2015

== International competitions ==
Year	Competition	Venue	Position	Event	Notes
2011	World Youth Championships	Villeneuve-d'Ascq, France	6th	400 m	53.01
2011	World Youth Championships	Villeneuve-d'Ascq, France	2nd	Medley relay	2:03.92
2012	World Junior Championships	Barcelona, Spain	1st	4 × 400 m relay	3:30.01
2013	Pan American Junior Championships	Medellín, Colombia	2nd	400 m	52.59
2013	Pan American Junior Championships	Medellín, Colombia	1st	4 × 400 m relay	3:36.48
2014	World Junior Championships	Eugene, United States	1st	400 m	51.85
2014	World Junior Championships	Eugene, United States	1st	4 × 400 m relay	3:30.42
2015	Pan American Games	Toronto, Canada	1st	400 m	51.27
2015	Pan American Games	Toronto, Canada	1st	4 × 400 m relay	3:25.68
2023	Pan American Games	Santiago, Chile	5th	4 × 400 m relay	3:35.91

== See also ==
- List of 2015 Pan American Games medal winners
