= Gunta Vaičule =

Latvian sprinter

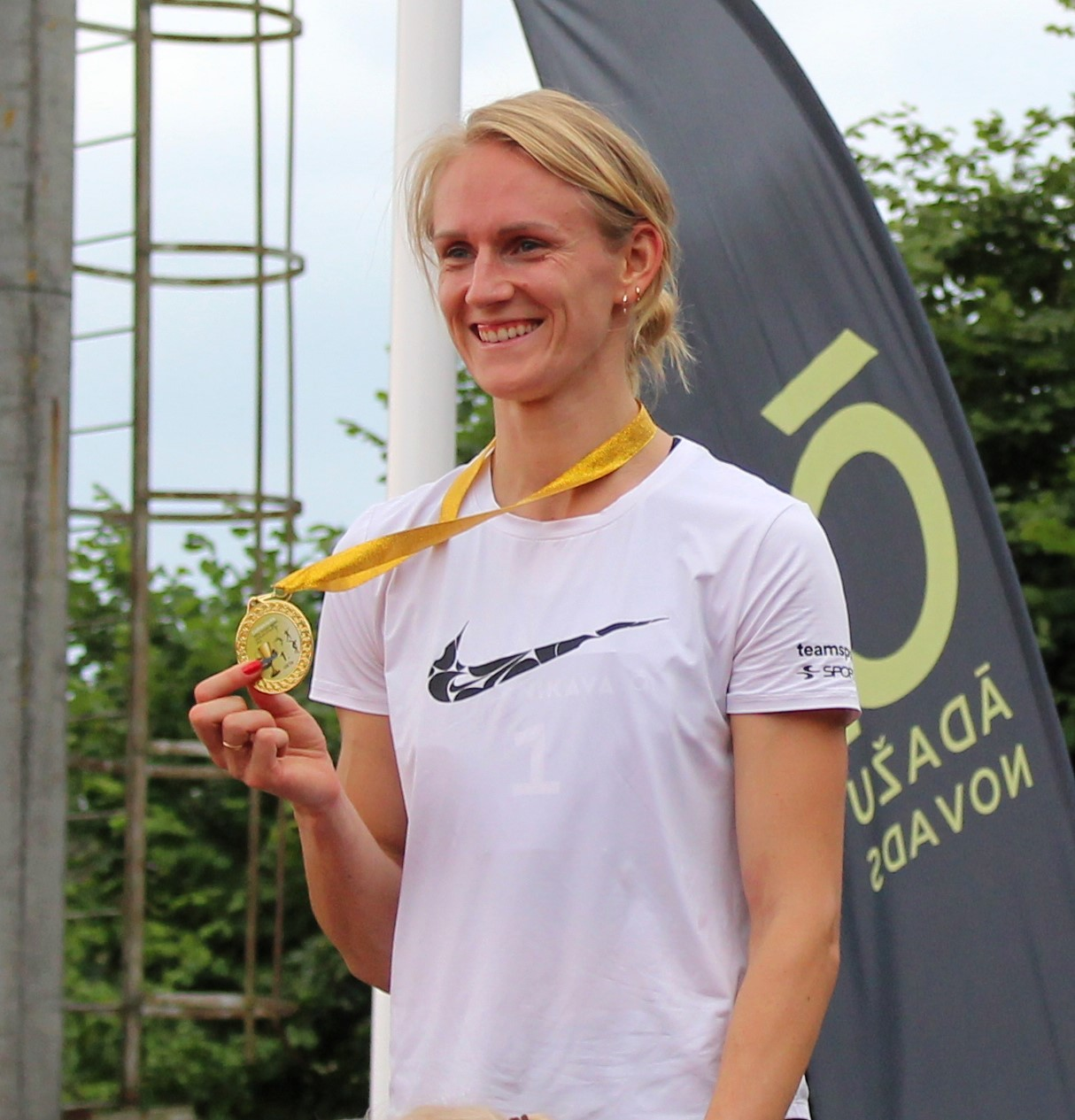

Personal information
- Born: Gunta Latiševa-Čudare; 9 March 1995 (age 30) Rēzekne, Latvia
- Height: 1.79 m (5 ft 10 in)
- Weight: 68 kg (150 lb)

Sport
- Sport: Track and field
- Event: 400 metres

Gunta Vaičule (born Latiševa-Čudare; born 9 March 1995) is a Latvian sprinter specialising in the 400 metres. She represented her country at the 2015 World Championships in Beijing. Her personal best in the event is 50.83 seconds set in Valmiera in 2024.

== International competitions ==
Year	Competition	Venue	Position	Event	Notes
Representing Latvia
2011	World Youth Championships	Lille, France	26th (h)	100 m	12.26
2011	World Youth Championships	Lille, France	15th (sf)	200 m	24.39
2011	European Youth Olympic Festival	Trabzon, Turkey	4th	200 m	24.24
2012	World Junior Championships	Barcelona, Spain	32nd (h)	400 m	55.57
2013	European Junior Championships	Rieti, Italy	4th	400 m	52.76
2014	World Junior Championships	Eugene, United States	13th (sf)	400 m	54.23
2014	European Championships	Zürich, Switzerland	21st (h)	400 m	53.37
2015	European U23 Championships	Tallinn, Estonia	8th (h)	400 m	52.60
2015	European U23 Championships	Tallinn, Estonia	10th (h)	4 × 100 m relay	46.65
2015	World Championships	Beijing, China	30th (h)	400 m	52.17
2016	European Championships	Amsterdam, Netherlands	20th (sf)	400 m	53.11
2016	Olympic Games	Rio de Janeiro, Brazil	45th (h)	400 m	53.08
2017	European U23 Championships	Bydgoszcz, Poland	1st	400 m	52.00
2017	World Championships	London, United Kingdom	12th (sf)	400 m	51.57
2017	Universiade	Taipei, Taiwan	2nd	200 m	23.15
2018	European Championships	Berlin, Germany	10th (sf)	400 m	51.60
2019	European Indoor Championships	Glasgow, United Kingdom	14th (sf)	400 m	53.53
2019	Universiade	Naples, Italy	4th	200 m	23.12
2019	World Championships	Doha, Qatar	30th (h)	200 m	23.32
2022	World Indoor Championships	Belgrade, Serbia	20th (h)	400 m	53.05
2022	World Championships	Eugene, United States	25th (h)	400 m	52.21
2022	European Championships	Munich, Germany	10th (sf)	400 m	51.25
2023	European Indoor Championships	Istanbul, Turkey	10th (sf)	400 m	53.57
2023	World Championships	Budapest, Hungary	25th (h)	400 m	51.36
2024	World Indoor Championships	Glasgow, United Kingdom	17th (h)	400 m	53.09
2024	European Championships	Rome, Italy	24th (sf)	200 m	23.48
2024	Olympic Games	Paris, France	8th (rep)	400 m	50.93
