= Verone Chambers =

Jamaican athletics competitor

Personal information
- Born: 16 December 1988 (age 37) Clarendon Parish, Jamaica

Sport
- Sport: Track and field
Medal record
Representing Jamaica
World Indoor Championships
Silver medal – second place	2014 Sopot	4x400m relay
World Relays
Bronze medal – third place	2017 Nassau	4x400m relay
Pan American Games
Silver medal – second place	2015 Toronto	4x400m relay

Verone Chambers (born December 16, 1988) is a Jamaican sprinter. She ran for Oklahoma Baptist University, graduating in 2012 after winning 18 NAIA championship titles, a record high for OBU women. Chambers was part of Jamaica's silver medal-winning 4 × 400 m relay team at the 2014 IAAF World Indoor Championships, although she only ran in the heats. At the 2015 Pan American Games, she again ran in the 4 × 400 m relay for Jamaica, and won a silver medal along with Anastasia Le-Roy, Chrisann Gordon, and Bobby-Gaye Wilkins. She ran in the 4 × 400 m relay at the 2017 IAAF World Relays, winning third place. Chambers is from in Clarendon, Jamaica.
