= Praise Idamadudu =

Nigerian sprinter

Personal information
- Nationality: Nigerian
- Born: 18 December 1998 (age 27) Ovu, Delta State

Sport
- Country: Nigeria
- Sport: Athletics
- Event(s): 200 metres, 400 metres

Achievements and titles
- Personal best(s): 200 m: 23.48 (2015); 400 m: 52.49 (2018)
Medal record
Representing Nigeria
Women's athletics
Commonwealth Games
Silver medal – second place	2018 Gold Coast	4 × 400 m relay

Praise Oghenefejiro Idamadudu (born 18 December 1998) is a Nigeria female track and field sprinter who competes in the 200 metres and the 400 metres. She was a silver medallist in the 4 × 400 metres relay at the 2018 Commonwealth Games.

== Career ==
Born in Ovu, Delta State, Idamadudu made her international debut at the 2014 African Youth Games, where she was the 200 m gold medallist. Later that year she competed at the 2014 World Junior Championships in Athletics in the 200, 400 and 4 × 400 metres relay. She was also due to compete for Nigeria at the 2014 Summer Youth Olympics, but the whole team was pressured into withdrawal over concerns about the West African Ebola virus epidemic. At the 2015 African Junior Athletics Championships she was a double gold medallist (200 m and 4 × 400 m relay) but was beaten into second in the 200 m at the 2015 African Youth Athletics Championships by South Africa's Nicola de Bruyn. She ended the year with three gold medals at the Commonwealth Youth Games, taking the 200 m and two relay titles.

Idamadudu took her first senior national title in the 200 m at the 2015 Nigerian Athletics Championships. Her performances that year earned her comparisons to Olympic medallist Falilat Ogunkoya from national media. She missed parts of the 2016 season due to a knee injury. She also competed sparingly in 2017, which her season highlight being a runner-up finish in the 200 m at the national championships. Idamadudu made her senior international debut at the 2018 Commonwealth Games, reaching the 200 m semi-finals and sharing in the 4 × 400 metres relay silver medals with Yinka Ajayi, Patience Okon George and Glory Onome Nathaniel.

== International competitions ==
Year	Competition	Venue	Position	Event	Notes
2014	African Youth Games	Gaborone, Botswana	1st	200 m	24.16
2014	World Junior Championships	Eugene, United States	7th (semis)	200 m	24.25
2014	World Junior Championships	Eugene, United States	—	400 m	DQ
2014	World Junior Championships	Eugene, United States	5th	4 × 400 m relay	3:35.14
2015	African Junior Championships	Addis Ababa, Ethiopia	1st	200 m	23.76
2015	African Junior Championships	Addis Ababa, Ethiopia	1st	4 × 400 m relay	3:38.94
2015	African Youth Championships	Moka, Mauritius	2nd	200 m	23.79
2015	African Youth Championships	Moka, Mauritius	1st	Medley relay	2:08.71
2015	Commonwealth Youth Games	Apia, Samoa	1st	200 m	23.30 w
2015	Commonwealth Youth Games	Apia, Samoa	1st	4 × 100 m relay	45.86
2015	Commonwealth Youth Games	Apia, Samoa	1st	4 × 400 m relay	4:02.75
2018	Commonwealth Games	Gold Coast, Australia	7th (semis)	200 m	23.69
2018	Commonwealth Games	Gold Coast, Australia	2nd	4 × 400 m relay	3:25.29
2018	African Championships	Asaba, Nigeria	8th	200 m	23.79
2019	World Relays	Yokohama, Japan	18th (h)	4 × 400 m relay	3:32.10
2022	African Championships	Port Louis, Mauritius	11th (sf)	200 m	23.58
2022	African Championships	Port Louis, Mauritius	9th (sf)	400 m	54.44
2022	African Championships	Port Louis, Mauritius	1st	4 × 100 m relay	44.45

== National titles ==
- Nigerian Athletics Championships
  - 200 m: 2015
