= 2017 World Championships in Athletics – Women's 4 × 400 metres relay =

Women's 4 × 400 metres relay at the 2017 World Championships
- Venue: Olympic Stadium
- Dates: 12 August (heats); 13 August (final)
- Competitors: 72 from 16 nations
- Winning time: 3:19.02

Medalists
gold medal	Quanera Hayes; Allyson Felix; Shakima Wimbley; Phyllis Francis; Kendall Ellis; Natasha Hastings	United States
silver medal	Zoey Clark; Laviai Nielsen; Eilidh Doyle; Emily Diamond; Perri Shakes-Drayton	Great Britain
bronze medal	Małgorzata Hołub; Iga Baumgart; Aleksandra Gaworska; Justyna Święty; Patrycja Wyciszkiewicz; Martyna Dąbrowska	Poland

The women's 4 × 400 metres relay at the 2017 World Championships in Athletics was held at the London Olympic Stadium on 12–13 August.

== Summary ==
In the final, the early leader was Nigeria as Patience Okon George made up the stagger on Botswana to her outside as they entered the far turn. Chrisann Gordon pulled Jamaica close to Nigeria on the inside but lost some ground coming off the turn. Down the home stretch, George faded while Quanera Hayes brought USA into the lead at the handoff to Allyson Felix. Felix ran a fast turn to put some separation on the field by the break. Further outside, Jamaica's Anneisha McLaughlin-Whilby was the next in contention until about 50 metres into her leg she McLaughlin-Whilby began to hop and lean back in pain. The entire field passed her as she tried to continue to the break line before collapsing to the track. Felix and USA had a 20-metre lead over the next best, Nigeria, a metre ahead of Great Britain.

Felix continued to expand the lead. Down the homestretch, Laviai Nielsen ran GBR past Nigeria's Abike Funmilola Egbeniyi, but USA had already passed to Shakima Wimbley almost four seconds before the other teams arrived. Iga Baumgart ran around the outside and after the handoff Aleksandra Gaworska, Poland was behind GBR's Eilidh Doyle breaking away from the other teams. 25 metres behind USA, Doyle opened up almost five metres on Gaworska but on the home stretch Doyle began to fade, Gaworska came back while Wimbley was speeding away. USA passed to world champion Phyllis Francis for their anchor. Over five seconds later, GBR passed to Emily Diamond slightly ahead of Poland's pass to Justyna Święty. Francis continued to expand the lead. Behind her Diamond opened up as much as a 10-metre gap on Święty while Nigeria's Yinka Ajayi and France's Elea-Mariama Diarra almost catching her from behind by the half way mark. Francis finished six seconds ahead of Diamond, a virtual walkover gold for USA, with Święty closing rapidly on the homestretch to get Poland close to GBR by the finish.

The 5.98 second margin of victory was the largest in World Championship 4 × 400 metres history.

== Records ==
Before the competition records were as follows:

Record	Perf.	Team	Date	Location
World	3:15.17	Soviet Union; Tatyana Ledovskaya, Olga Nazarova, Mariya Kulchunova, Olga Bryzgina	1 Oct 1988	Seoul, South Korea
Championship	3:16.71	United States; Gwen Torrence, Maicel Malone-Wallace, Natasha Kaiser-Brown, Jearl Miles Clark	22 Aug 1993	Stuttgart, Germany
World leading	3:23.13	(United States) University of Oregon; Makenzie Dunmore, Deajah Stevens, Elexis Guster, Raevyn Rogers	10 Jun 2017	Eugene, United States
African	3:21.04	Nigeria; Olabisi Afolabi, Fatima Yusuf, Charity Opara, Falilat Ogunkoya	3 Aug 1996	Atlanta, United States
Asian record	3:24.28	China Hebei Province; An Xiaohong, Bai Xiaoyun, Cao Chunying, Ma Yuqin	13 Sep 1993	Beijing, China
NACAC	3:15.51	United States; Denean Howard-Hill, Diane Dixon, Valerie Brisco-Hooks, Florence Griffith-Joyner	1 Oct 1988	Seoul, South Korea
South American	3:26.68	Brazil BM&F Bovespa; Geisa Aparecida Coutinho, Bárbara de Oliveira, Joelma Sousa, Jailma de Lima	7 Aug 2011	São Paulo, Brazil
European	3:15.17	Soviet Union; Tatyana Ledovskaya, Olga Nazarova, Mariya Kulchunova, Olga Bryzgina	1 Oct 1988	Seoul, South Korea
Oceanian	3:23.81	Australia; Nova Peris, Tamsyn Manou, Melinda Gainsford-Taylor, Cathy Freeman	30 Sep 2000	Sydney, Australia

The following records were set at the competition:

Record	Perf.	Team	Date
World leading	3:21.66	United States; Quanera Hayes, Kendall Ellis, Shakima Wimbley, Natasha Hastings	12 Aug 2017
World leading	3:19.02	United States; Quanera Hayes, Allyson Felix, Shakima Wimbley, Phyllis Francis	13 Aug 2017
Botswanan	3:26.90	Botswana; Christine Botlogetswe, Lydia Jele, Galefele Moroko, Amantle Montsho	12 Aug 2017

== Qualification criteria ==
The first eight placed teams at the 2017 IAAF World Relays and the host country qualify automatically for entry with remaining places being filled by teams with the fastest performances during the qualification period.

== Schedule ==
The event schedule, in local time (UTC+1), is as follows:

Date	Time	Round
12 August	11:20	Heats
13 August	20:55	Final

== Results ==
=== Heats ===
Video on YouTube Official Video

The first round took place on 12 August in two heats as follows:

Heat	1	2
Start time	11:20	11:32
Photo finish	link	link

The first three in each heat ( Q ) and the next two fastest ( q ) qualified for the final. The overall results were as follows:

Rank	Heat	Lane	Nation	Athletes	Time	Notes
1	1	3	United States	Quanera Hayes, Kendall Ellis, Shakima Wimbley, Natasha Hastings	3:21.66	Q, WL
2	2	8	Jamaica	Anastasia Le-Roy, Anneisha McLaughlin-Whilby, Chrisann Gordon, Stephenie Ann McPherson	3:23.64	Q, SB
3	1	4	Great Britain & N.I.	Zoey Clark, Laviai Nielsen, Perri Shakes-Drayton, Emily Diamond	3:24.74	Q, SB
4	2	6	Nigeria	Patience Okon George, Glory Onome Nathaniel, Emerald Egwim, Yinka Ajayi	3:25.40	Q, SB
5	2	9	Germany	Ruth Spelmeyer, Nadine Gonska, Svea Köhrbrück, Laura Müller	3:26.24	Q, SB
6	2	9	Poland	Małgorzata Hołub, Patrycja Wyciszkiewicz, Martyna Dąbrowska, Iga Baumgart	3:26.47	q, SB
7	1	5	Botswana	Christine Botlogetswe, Lydia Jele, Galefele Moroko, Amantle Montsho	3:26.90	Q, NR
8	1	6	France	Déborah Sananes, Estelle Perrossier, Agnès Raharolahy, Elea-Mariama Diarra	3:27.59	q, SB
9	2	7	Italy	Maria Benedicta Chigbolu, Maria Enrica Spacca, Libania Grenot, Ayomide Folorunso	3:27.81	SB
10	2	5	Australia	Anneliese Rubie, Ella Connolly, Lauren Wells, Morgan Mitchell	3:28.02	SB
11	1	3	Canada	Carline Muir, Aiyanna Stiverne, Travia Jones, Natassha McDonald	3:28.47	SB
12	2	8	Ukraine	Kateryna Klymiuk, Olha Bibik, Tetyana Melnyk, Anastasiia Bryzhina	3:31.84	
13	2	7	South Africa	Justine Palframan, Gena Löfstrand, Ariane Nel, Wenda Nel	3:37.82	SB
	1	2	Bahamas	Lanece Clarke, Christine Amertil, Anthonique Strachan, Shaquania Dorsett	DNF	
	1	2	India	Jisna Mathew, M. R. Poovamma, Anilda Thomas, Nirmala Sheoran	DQ	R 163.3 (a)
	1	5	Netherlands	Madiea Ghafoor, Lisanne de Witte, Laura de Witte, Eva Hovenkamp	DQ	R 170.6 (c)

=== Final ===
The final took place on 13 August at 20:55. The results were as follows (photo finish):

Rank	Lane	Nation	Athletes	Time	Notes
1st place, gold medalist(s)	4	United States	Quanera Hayes, Allyson Felix, Shakima Wimbley, Phyllis Francis	3:19.02	WL
2nd place, silver medalist(s)	5	Great Britain & N.I.	Zoey Clark, Laviai Nielsen, Eilidh Doyle, Emily Diamond	3:25.00	
3rd place, bronze medalist(s)	3	Poland	Małgorzata Hołub, Iga Baumgart, Aleksandra Gaworska, Justyna Święty	3:25.41	SB
4	2	France	Estelle Perrossier, Déborah Sananes, Agnès Raharolahy, Elea-Mariama Diarra	3:26.56	SB
5	7	Nigeria	Patience Okon George, Abike Funmilola Egbeniyi, Glory Onome Nathaniel, Yinka Ajayi	3:26.72	
6	9	Germany	Ruth Spelmeyer, Laura Müller, Nadine Gonska, Hannah Mergenthaler	3:27.45	
7	8	Botswana	Christine Botlogetswe, Lydia Jele, Galefele Moroko, Amantle Montsho	3:28.00	
	6	Jamaica	Chrisann Gordon, Anneisha McLaughlin-Whilby, Shericka Jackson, Novlene Williams-Mills	DNF	
