= Laviai Nielsen =

British sprinter (born 1996)

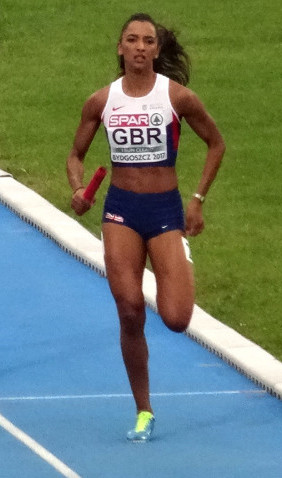
- Nielsen in 2017

Personal information
- Nationality: British
- Born: 13 March 1996 (age 30)
- Home town: London, England
- Height: 1.71 m (5 ft 7 in)
- Weight: 58 kg (128 lb)

Sport
- Sport: Athletics
- Event: 400 metres
- Club: Enfield and Haringey AC
- Coached by: Frank Adams 2013-2017, Rana Reider 2017-2021, Christine Harrison-Bloomfield 2021-2024, Tony Lester 2024-2025, Michael Ford 2026-now

Achievements and titles
- Personal bests: 100 m: 11.47 (Johannesburg 2024); 200 m: 23.32 (Johannesburg 2024); 400 m: 49.87 (London 2024); Indoor; 400 m: 50.89 (Glasgow, 2023)
Medal record
Women's athletics
Representing Great Britain
Olympic Games
Bronze medal – third place	2024 Paris	4×400 m relay
Bronze medal – third place	2024 Paris	4×400 m mixed
World Championships
Silver medal – second place	2017 London	4×400 m relay
Silver medal – second place	2023 Budapest	4×400 m mixed
Bronze medal – third place	2022 Eugene	4×400 m relay
Bronze medal – third place	2023 Budapest	4×400 m relay
World Indoor Championships
Bronze medal – third place	2024 Glasgow	4×400 m relay
World Relays
Bronze medal – third place	2021 Chorzów	4×400 m relay
European Championships
Bronze medal – third place	2022 Munich	4×400 m relay
European Indoor Championships
Silver medal – second place	2017 Belgrade	4×400 m relay
Silver medal – second place	2019 Glasgow	4×400 m relay
World Junior Championships
Silver medal – second place	2014 Eugene	4×400 m relay
European Junior Championships
Gold medal – first place	2015 Eskilstuna	400 m
Gold medal – first place	2015 Eskilstuna	4×400 m relay

Laviai Nielsen (born 13 March 1996) is a British sprinter specialising in the 400 metres.

In 2015, she took a gold medal in the 400 m at the European Junior Championships.

She won several medals as a member of the Great Britain 4x400 metres relay teams, including silver at the 2017 World Championships in the women's 4 x 400 metres, and at the 2023 World Championships in the mixed 4 x 400 metres, and bronze in the women's 4 x 400 metres at the 2022 World Championships. She won two bronze medals at the 2024 Summer Olympics as part of both British 4 x 400 metres relay teams, mixed and women categories.

Nielsen has an identical twin sister, Lina Nielsen, who is also an international athlete in the same events, but who has moved into 400-metre hurdles in recent years.

In August 2022, Nielsen disclosed that she had been diagnosed with multiple sclerosis in the summer of 2021. Her twin sister Lina had been diagnosed with the same condition some years earlier, and, as it has genetic properties, Nielsen was tested for the illness.

== Early life ==
Nielsen grew up in Leytonstone, East London. Her mother is Egyptian-Sudanese and her father is Danish. At the age of 16, she was a bag carrier for British heptathlete Jessica Ennis at the 2012 London Olympics, a pivotal experience in her development as an athlete. "I stood behind Jessica Ennis and when she came out the crowd cheering was the loudest thing I've heard in my life," she recalled. "I thought, 'I want that'."

In 2017, she took a year out from her geography degree at King's College London. Nielsen is an Athlete Ambassador for sport for development charity Right To Play.

== Career ==
=== 2011-19 ===
Nielsen was initially a middle-distance runner, but in 2013 she and her twin sister were approached at an event and persuaded to change specialism to the 400 metres. Laviai proceeded to reduce her 400m personal best by 2 seconds within 2 months, and a further four seconds by the following season.

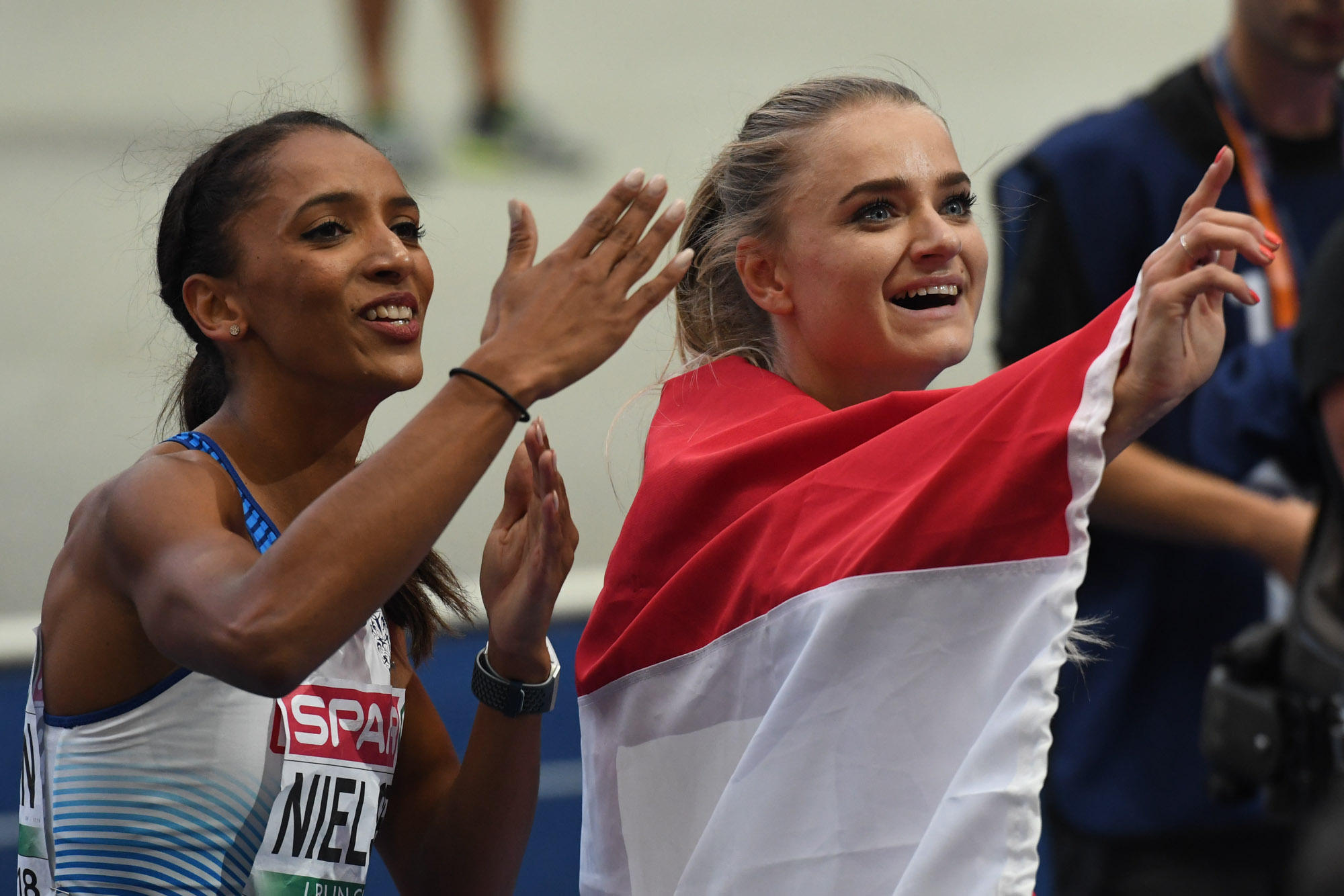
Nielsen (left) with Dutchwoman Lisanne de Witte at the 2018 European Athletics Championships in Berlin

Nielsen's breakthrough year came in 2015, when she won gold in the 400 metres at the 2015 European Junior Championships in Sweden. She topped this off by running the final leg for the winning 4 x 400 metres relay team, with her sister Lina running the second leg. Nielsen also lowered her personal best to 52.25s, the British junior's third-fastest performance of all time and the fastest time since 33 years. She finished the season ranked number 2 in the UK. This success earned Nielsen a place on the Jaguar Land Rover Academy of Sport programme, which offers financial support and mentoring.

In February 2017, she recorded a personal best of 51.90s at an indoor meet in Birmingham. In the summer, she reached the final of the 400 metres at the 2017 European Indoor Championships in Belgrade, finishing fourth to miss out on a bronze medal by just 0.27 seconds. On the final day of the championships, she ran the anchor leg of the 4 x 400 meters relay, winning the silver medal behind a strong Polish team.

=== 2020-present ===
She became a double British champion when successfully defending her 400 metres title at the 2020 British Athletics Championships in a time of 51.72 secs.

In December 2021, Nielsen had her lottery funding removed by UK Athletics after she refused to stop working directly with coach Rana Reider, with UK Athletics saying: "Any athlete working directly with Rana Reider, given the confirmed complaints of sexual misconduct against him from US Safe Sport, will not be able to be supported through the World Class Programme." Nielsen returned to the Olympic relay funding stream at the end of 2022.

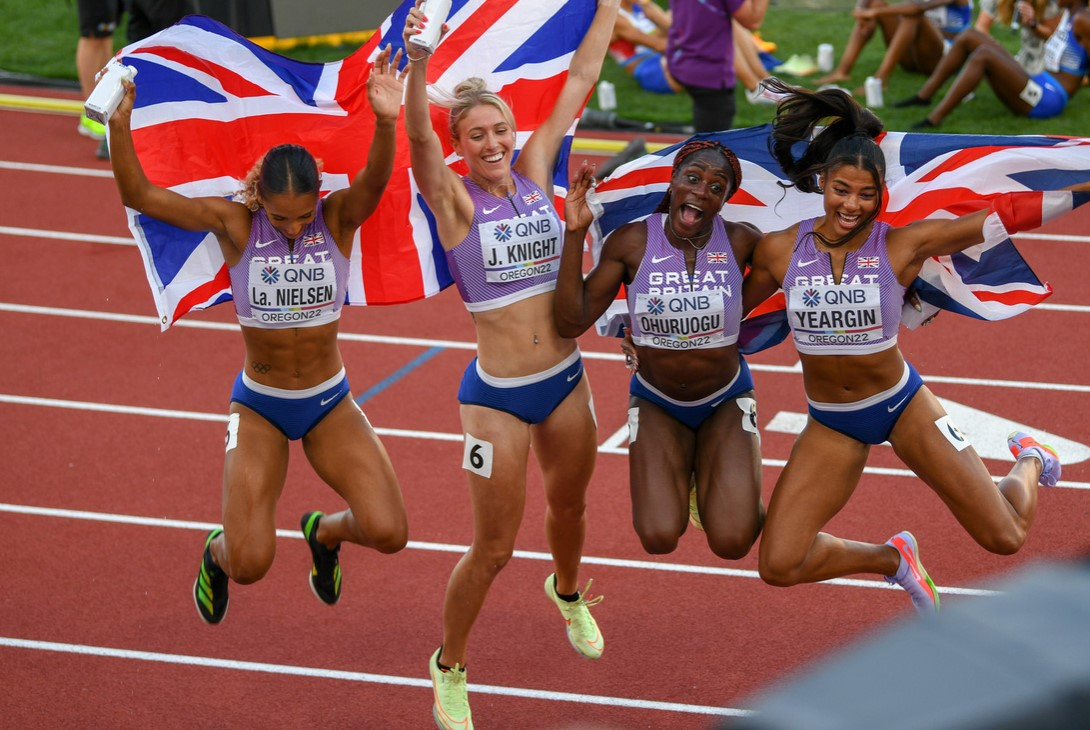
Nielsen celebrating after the 4×400 m relay at the 2022 World Championships.

In 2022, Nielsen won a bronze medal at the World Championships in Eugene, Oregon as part of the 4x400 m relay team.

Nielsen equalled her personal best over 400 m in 2023, clocking 50.83 in Bern. She also won two medals at the 2023 World Championships as she won bronze in the Women's 4x400 and silver in the Mixed 4x400.

In 2024, Nielsen was selected for the British team at the World Indoor Championships in Glasgow. She finished fourth in the final of the 400 m. Still, she won a bronze medal in the 4x400 m relay alongside her twin sister Lina. Nielsen also competed at the European Championships in Rome. She set a new personal over 400m of 50.71 to finish sixth in the final, having also broken her previous personal best in the semi-final, with a time of 50.73.

After winning the 400 metres silver medal at the 2024 British Athletics Championships, Nielsen was subsequently named in the Great Britain team for the 2024 Summer Olympics. Nielsen ran a big personal best at the London Athletics Meet on 20 July 2024, clocking 49.87s and breaking the 50-second barrier for the first time.

At the Olympics, she was part of the mixed 4x400 team which won a bronze medal in a new national record of 3:08.01. She also made the women 4x400 team which won a second bronze medal, setting a new national record of 3:19.72.

== Achievements ==
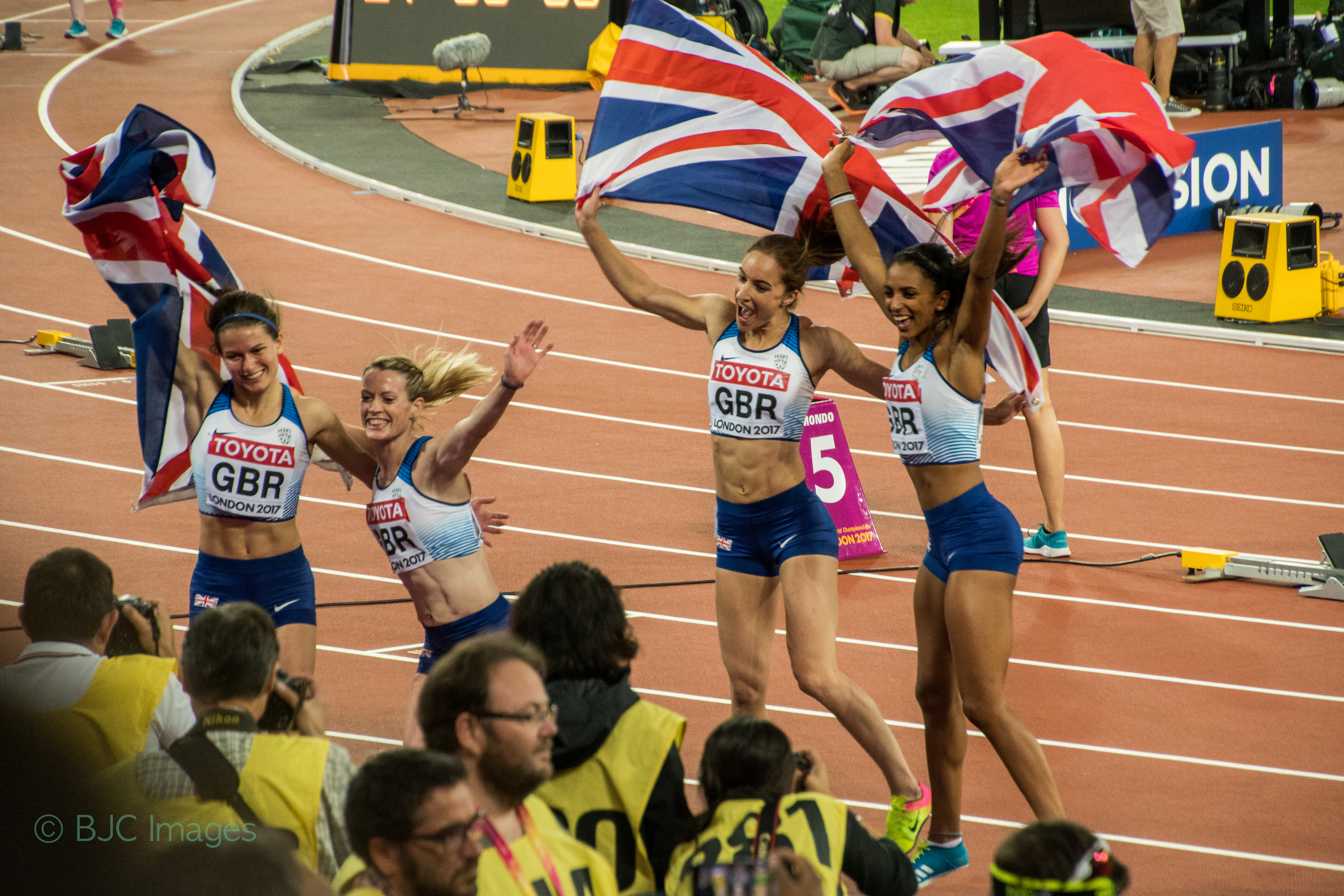
Nielsen (right) with silver 4x400 m relay team at the 2017 World Championships

=== International competitions ===
Representing Great Britain & England
Year	Competition	Venue	Position	Event	Notes
2014	World Junior Championships	Eugene, OR, USA	2nd	4 × 400 m	3:35.37 (Note: Time from the heats; Nielsen was replaced in the final.)
2015	European Junior Championships	Eskilstuna, Sweden	1st	400 m	52.58
2015	European Junior Championships	Eskilstuna, Sweden	1st	4 × 400 m relay	3:34.36
2017	European Indoor Championships	Belgrade, Serbia	4th	400 m	52.79
2017	European Indoor Championships	Belgrade, Serbia	2nd	4 × 400 m relay	3:31.05
2017	World Relays	Nassau, Bahamas	4th	4 × 400 m relay	3:28.72 SB
2017	European Team Championships Super League	Lille, France	3rd	4 × 400 m relay	3:28.96
2017	European U23 Championships	Bydgoszcz, Poland	5th	400 m	53.18
2017	European U23 Championships	Bydgoszcz, Poland	4th	4 × 400 m relay	3:30.74
2017	World Championships	London, United Kingdom	2nd	4 × 400 m relay	3:25.00 (SB h)
2018	European Championships	Berlin, Germany	4th	4 × 400 m relay	51.21
2019	European Indoor Championships	Glasgow, United Kingdom	2nd	4 × 400 m relay	3:29.55
2019	World Relays	Yokohama, Japan	6th	4 × 400 m relay	3:28.96 (SB h)
2019	World Championships	Doha, Qatar	22nd (sf)	400 m	52.94
2019	World Championships	Doha, Qatar	4th	4 × 400 m relay	3:23.02 SB
2021	World Relays	Chorzów, Poland	3rd	4 × 400 m relay	3:29.27
2021	World Relays	Chorzów, Poland	5th	4 × 400 m mixed	3:17.27
2021	Olympic Games	Tokyo, Japan	5th	4 × 400 m relay	3:23.99
2022	World Championships	Eugene, OR, United States	3rd	4 × 400 m relay	3:22.64 SB
2022	World Championships	Eugene, OR, United States	9th (h)	4 × 400 m mixed	3:14.75 SB
2022	European Championships	Munich, Germany	12th (SF)	400 m	51.53 SB
2022	European Championships	Munich, Germany	3rd	4 × 400 m relay	3:23.79
2023	World Championships	Budapest, Hungary	2nd	4 × 400 m mixed	3:11.06 SB
2023	World Championships	Budapest, Hungary	3rd	4 × 400 m relay	3:21.04 SB
2024	World Indoor Championships	Glasgow, United Kingdom	4th	400 m	50.89
2024	World Indoor Championships	Glasgow, United Kingdom	3rd	4 × 400 m relay	3:26.36
2024	European Championships	Rome, Italy	6th	400 m	50.71
2024	Olympic Games	Paris, France	12th (sf)	400 m	50.69
2024	Olympic Games	Paris, France	3rd	4 × 400 m relay	3:19.72
2026	Commonwealth Games	Glasgow, United Kingdom	9th (sf)	400 m	52.17

=== Circuit performances ===
Grand Slam Track results
Slam	Race group	Event	Pl.	Time	Prize money
2025 Philadelphia Slam	Long sprints	400 m	6th	52.01	US$10,000
2025 Philadelphia Slam	Long sprints	200 m	8th	23.34	US$10,000

== Personal life ==
=== Multiple sclerosis ===
In August 2022, Nielsen disclosed that she had been diagnosed with multiple sclerosis in the summer of 2021. Her twin sister, Lina, had revealed that she was suffering from the same condition two weeks earlier, having been diagnosed in 2013, when she was 17. As MS has a genetic element, Nielsen was considered to be at higher risk of the illness following Lina's diagnosis. Nielsen and Lina received support through the diagnosis from friend and Paralympic champion, Kadeena Cox, who took up paralympic sport after her own MS diagnosis. Despite the diagnosis, Nielsen, and her sister, continue to compete in Olympic athletics rather than para-athletics.

Mental Health

In 2026, Nielsen revealed she suffered from burnout following the 2024 Paris Olympic Games and “took three months off to recover from burnout”.
