= 2015 European Athletics Junior Championships =

- Dates: 16–19 July
- Host city: Eskilstuna, Sweden
- Level: Under 20
- Events: 44
- Records set: 4 CRs

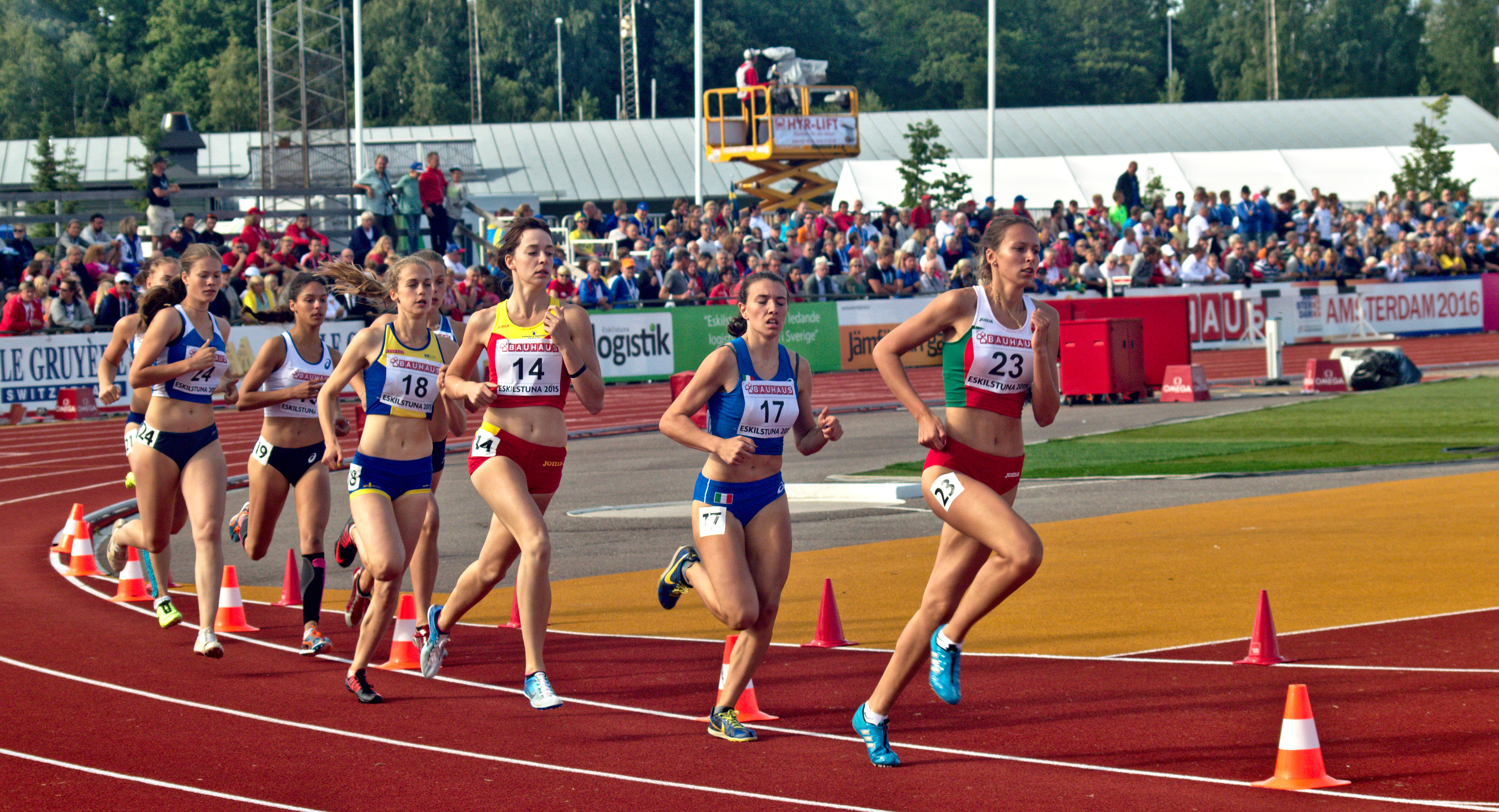
Heptathletes running 800 metres at the 2015 European Athletics Junior Championships

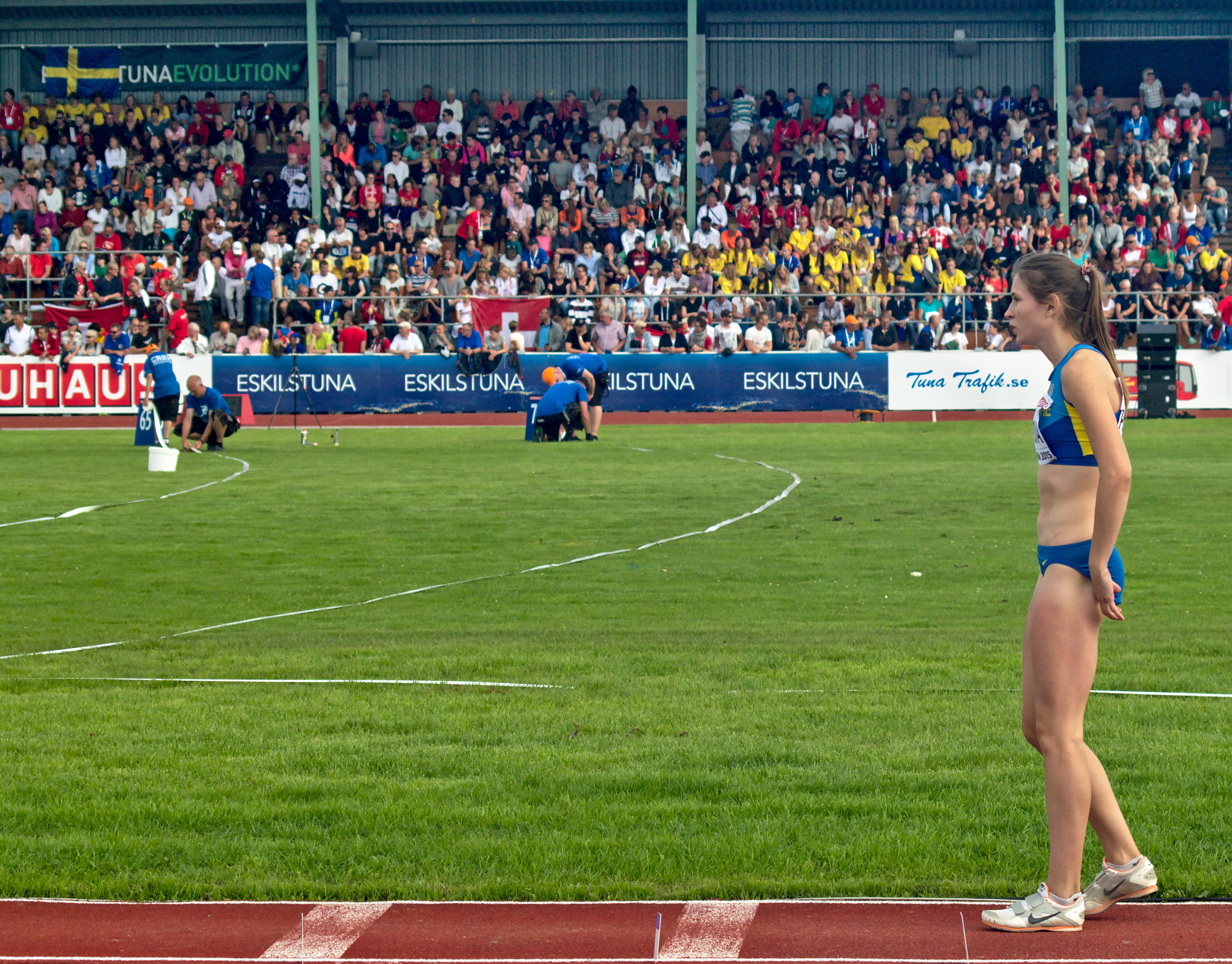
Women's triple jump

The 2015 European Athletics Junior Championships were the 23rd edition of the biennial European U20 athletics championships. They were held in Eskilstuna, Sweden from 16 July to 19 July.

The medal table was topped by Great Britain with 17 medals overall, including 11 golds, ahead of Germany and Russia.

== Medal summary ==
=== Men ===
| Event | Gold | | Silver | | Bronze | |
|---|---|---|---|---|---|---|
| 100 metres | Ojie Edoburun; Great Britain | 10.36 | Joseph Dewar; Great Britain | 10.46 | Emil von Barth; Sweden | 10.64 |
| 200 metres | Tommy Ramdhan; Great Britain | 20.57 | Elliot Powell; Great Britain | 20.72 | Even Meinseth; Norway | 20.94 |
| 400 metres | Benjamin Lobo Vedel; Denmark | 46.48 | Karsten Warholm; Norway | 46.50 | Batuhan Altıntaş; Turkey | 46.95 |
| 800 metres | Kyle Langford; Great Britain | 1:48.99 | Konstantin Tolokonnikov; Russia | 1:49.00 | Mateusz Borkowski; Poland | 1:49.21 |
| 1500 metres | Josh Kerr; Great Britain | 3:49.62 | Baptiste Mischler; France | 3:49.88 | Andriy Aliksiychuk; Ukraine | 3:50.22 |
| 5000 metres | Alex George; Great Britain | 14:34.42 | Simon Debognies; Belgium | 14:34.67 | Yeman Crippa; Italy | 14:35.39 |
| 10,000 metres | Pietro Riva; Italy | 30:20.45 | Fabian Gering; Germany | 30:20.69 | Dieter Kersten; Belgium | 30:21.85 |
| 110 metres hurdles (100 cm) | Kamil Salimullin; Russia | 13.60 | Florian Lickteig; Germany | 13.64 | Henrik Hannemann; Germany | 13.67 |
| 400 metres hurdles | Victor Coroller; France | 50.53 | Joshua Abuaku; Germany | 51.46; PB | Dominik Hufnagl; Austria | 51.74; PB |
| 3000 metres steeplechase | Yohanes Chiappinelli; Italy | 8:47.58 | Patrick Karl; Germany | 8:54.10 | Balázs Juhász; Hungary | 8:58.11; PB |
| 4 × 100 metres relay | Sweden; Emil von Barth; Austin Hamilton; Thobias Nilsson Montler; Gustav Kjell | 39.73; NJR | Poland; Artur Wasilewski; Przemysław Adamski; Krzysztof Wróbel; Eryk Hampel | 40.00 | France; Nans André; Maxime Gardès; Dylan Barbier; Amaury Golitin | 40.02 |
| 4 × 400 metres relay | Russia; Andrey Yefremov; Andrey Kukharenko; Konstantin Tolokonnikov; Ilya Krasnov | 3:08.35 | Italy; Giuseppe Leonardi; Leonardo Vanzo; Simone Serafini; Daniele Corsa; Brayan Lopez (heats) | 3:10.04 | Germany; Constantin Schmidt; Pascal Unbehaun; Jaakkima Rösler; Aleksi Rösler | 3:10.12 |
| 10,000 m walk | Diego García; Spain | 40:05.21; WJL | Vladislav Saraykin; Russia | 40:59.28; PB | Pablo Oliva; Spain | 41:00.73; PB |
| High jump | Jonas Kløjgård Jensen; Denmark | 2.23; PB | Dawid Wawrzyniak; Poland | 2.23; PB | Oleksandr Barannikov; Ukraine | 2.19 |
| Pole vault | Adam Hague; Great Britain | 5.50 | Niko Koskinen; Finland | 5.35; PB | Alioune Sene; France | 5.30 =PB |
| Long jump | Anatoliy Ryapolov; Russia | 7.96 =PB | Jacob Fincham-Dukes; Great Britain | 7.75; PB | Filippo Randazzo; Italy | 7.74; PB |
| Triple jump | Nazim Babayev; Azerbaijan | 17.04; CR, NJR | Tobia Bocchi; Italy | 16.51 | Pavlo Beznits; Ukraine | 16.10 |
| Shot put (6 kg) | Konrad Bukowiecki; Poland | 22.62; CR, NJR | Andrei Toader; Romania | 20.78 | Sebastiano Bianchetti; Italy | 20.71; NJR |
| Discus throw (1.75 kg) | Bartłomiej Stój; Poland | 68.02; CR, NJR | Martin Marković; Croatia | 67.11 | Henning Prüfer; Germany | 64.18 |
| Hammer throw (6 kg) | Bence Halász; Hungary | 79.60; CR | Miguel Alberto Blanco; Spain | 79.05; PB | Matija Gregurić; Croatia | 77.35 |
| Javelin throw | Matija Muhar; Slovenia | 79.20; NJR, WJL | Simon Litzell; Sweden | 78.34 | Edis Matusevičius; Lithuania | 77.48; PB |
| Decathlon | Jan Doležal; Czech Republic | 7929; PB | Karsten Warholm; Norway | 7764; PB | Maksim Andraloits; Belarus | 7717; PB |

=== Women ===
| Event | Gold | | Silver | | Bronze | |
|---|---|---|---|---|---|---|
| 100 metres | Ewa Swoboda; Poland | 11.52 | Lisa Mayer; Germany | 11.64 | Kristina Sivkova; Russia | 11.68 |
| 200 metres | Gina Lückenkemper; Germany | 22.41 | Shannon Hylton; Great Britain | 22.73 | Maroussia Pare; France | 23.05 |
| 400 metres | Laviai Nielsen; Great Britain | 52.58 | Cheriece Hylton; Great Britain | 53.16; PB | Anastasiya Bednova; Russia | 53.27 |
| 800 metres | Renée Eykens; Belgium | 2:02.83 | Sarah Schmidt; Germany | 2:04.55 | Aníta Hinriksdóttir; Iceland | 2:05.04 |
| 1500 metres | Bobby Clay; Great Britain | 4:17.91 | Amy Griffiths; Great Britain | 4:20.41 | Konstanze Klosterhalfen; Germany | 4:20.84 |
| 3000 metres | Alina Reh; Germany | 9:12.29 | Célia Antón; Spain | 9:16.36 | Anna Emilie Møller; Denmark | 9:17.36; PB |
| 5000 metres | Alina Reh; Germany | 16:02.01 | Anna Emilie Møller; Denmark | 16:07.43; PB | Carmela Cardama Báez; Spain | 16:23.81; PB |
| 100 metres hurdles | Elvira Herman; Belarus | 13.15 | Luca Kozák; Hungary | 13.20 | Laura Valette; France | 13.21 |
| 400 metres hurdles | Nenah De Coninck; Belgium | 57.85; PB | Inge Drost; Netherlands | 57.88; PB | Ayomide Folorunso; Italy | 58.44 |
| 3000 metres steeplechase | Sümeyye Erol; Turkey | 10:19.15; PB | Carolina Johnsson; Sweden | 10:28.31 | Alisa Vainio; Finland | 10:30.83 |
| 4 × 100 metres relay | Great Britain; Shannon Malone; Shannon Hylton; Charlotte McLennaghan; Imani Lansiquot | 44.18 | Poland; Weronika Błażek; Zuzanna Kaniecka; Karolina Ciesielska; Ewa Swoboda | 45.28 | France; Caroline Chaillou; Cynthia Leduc; Maroussia Paré; Floriane Gnafoua | 45.35 |
| 4 × 400 metres relay | Great Britain; Cheriece Hylton; Lina Nielsen; Lily Beckford; Laviai Nielsen | 3:34.36 | Italy; Alice Mangione; Virginia Troiani; Federica Putti; Ayomide Folorunso | 3:37.45; NJR | Russia; Anastasiya Kudryavtseva; Yuliya Kondrashkina; Valeriya Tsaplina; Anastasiya Bednova | 3:37.57 |
| 10,000 m walk | Klavdiya Afanasyeva; Russia | 43:36.88; WL | Olga Shargina; Russia | 44:01.08; PB | Mariya Losinova; Russia | 44:07.44 |
| High jump | Morgan Lake; Great Britain | 1.91 | Nawal Meniker; France | 1.86 | Ellen Ekholm; Sweden | 1.83; PB |
| Pole vault | Angelica Moser; Switzerland | 4.35 | Alyona Lutkovskaya; Russia | 4.20 | Kamila Przybyła; Poland | 4.20 |
| Long jump | Florentina Marincu; Romania | 6.78 | Anna Bühler; Germany | 6.55 | Fatima Diame; Spain | 6.55 |
| Triple jump | Valentina Kosolapova; Russia | 13.27 | Kristina Malaya; Russia | 13.25 | Florentina Marincu; Romania | 13.08 |
| Shot put | Emel Dereli; Turkey | 18.40; NR | Claudine Vita; Germany | 17.13; PB | Alyona Bugakova; Russia | 16.81 |
| Discus throw | Claudine Vita; Germany | 57.47 | Veronika Domjan; Slovenia | 56.63; NR | Anastasiya Vityugova; Russia | 54.21; PB |
| Hammer throw | Audrey Ciofani; France | 67.20 | Beatrice Nedberge Llano; Norway | 64.76 | Katarzyna Furmanek; Poland | 63.80 |
| Javelin throw | Maria Andrejczyk; Poland | 59.73; PB | Anete Kociņa; Latvia | 58.88; PB | Aleksandra Ostrowska; Poland | 56.24; PB |
| Heptathlon | Caroline Agnou; Switzerland | 6123; NUR, WJL | Hanne Maudens; Belgium | 5720; PB | Louisa Grauvogel; Germany | 5704 |

== Medal table ==
Host nation

| Rank | Nation | Gold | Silver | Bronze | Total |
|---|---|---|---|---|---|
| 1 | Great Britain (GBR) | 11 | 6 | 0 | 17 |
| 2 | Russia (RUS) | 5 | 5 | 6 | 16 |
| 3 | Germany (GER) | 4 | 8 | 5 | 17 |
| 4 | Poland (POL) | 4 | 3 | 4 | 11 |
| 5 | Italy (ITA) | 2 | 3 | 4 | 9 |
| 6 | France (FRA) | 2 | 2 | 5 | 9 |
| 7 | Belgium (BEL) | 2 | 2 | 1 | 5 |
| 8 | Denmark (DEN) | 2 | 1 | 1 | 4 |
| 9 | Turkey (TUR) | 2 | 0 | 1 | 3 |
| 10 | Switzerland (SUI) | 2 | 0 | 0 | 2 |
| 11 | Spain (ESP) | 1 | 2 | 3 | 6 |
| 12 | Sweden (SWE)* | 1 | 2 | 2 | 5 |
| 13 | Hungary (HUN) | 1 | 1 | 1 | 3 |
| 13 | Romania (ROU) | 1 | 1 | 1 | 3 |
| 15 | Slovenia (SLO) | 1 | 1 | 0 | 2 |
| 16 | Belarus (BLR) | 1 | 0 | 1 | 2 |
| 17 | Azerbaijan (AZE) | 1 | 0 | 0 | 1 |
| 17 | Czech Republic (CZE) | 1 | 0 | 0 | 1 |
| 19 | Norway (NOR) | 0 | 3 | 1 | 4 |
| 20 | Croatia (CRO) | 0 | 1 | 1 | 2 |
| 20 | Finland (FIN) | 0 | 1 | 1 | 2 |
| 22 | Latvia (LAT) | 0 | 1 | 0 | 1 |
| 22 | Netherlands (NED) | 0 | 1 | 0 | 1 |
| 24 | Ukraine (UKR) | 0 | 0 | 3 | 3 |
| 25 | Austria (AUT) | 0 | 0 | 1 | 1 |
| 25 | Iceland (ISL) | 0 | 0 | 1 | 1 |
| 25 | Lithuania (LTU) | 0 | 0 | 1 | 1 |
| Totals (27 entries) | | 44 | 44 | 44 | 132 |
