= Emerald Egwim =

Nigerian-American sprinter

Personal information
- Nationality: American, Nigerian

Sport
- Sport: Sprinting
- Events: 400 and 4 × 400 metres

Emerald Egwim is a Nigerian-American sprinter. She competed in the women's 4 × 400 metres relay at the 2017 World Championships in Athletics.
