= Audrey Jean-Baptiste =

Canadian sprinter (born 1991)

Personal information
- Born: 15 July 1991 (age 34) Montreal, Quebec, Canada
- Education: University of Tulsa

Sport
- Sport: Athletics
- Event: 400 metres

Audrey Jean-Baptiste (born 15 July 1991) is a Canadian sprinter specialising in the 400 metres. She competed at the 2015 World Championships in Beijing finishing 39th overall in the heats.

== International competitions ==
Year	Competition	Venue	Position	Event	Notes
Representing Canada
2014	Commonwealth Games	Glasgow, United Kingdom	19th (sf)	400 m	53.61
2014	Commonwealth Games	Glasgow, United Kingdom	5th	4 × 400 m relay	3:32.45
2015	IAAF World Relays	Nassau, Bahamas	6th	4 × 400 m relay	3:29.65
2015	Pan American Games	Toronto, Ontario, Canada	11th (h)	400 m	54.27
2015	Pan American Games	Toronto, Ontario, Canada	4th (h)	4 × 400 m relay	3:30.61
2015	World Championships	Beijing, China	30th (h)	400 m	53.18
2015	World Championships	Beijing, China	8th	4 × 400 m relay	3:27.69
2017	IAAF World Relays	Nassau, Bahamas	2nd (B)	4 × 400 m relay	3:35.07
