= Athletics at the 2015 Pan American Games – Women's 400 metres =

Women's 400 metres at the 2015 Pan American Games
- Venue: CIBC Pan Am and Parapan Am Athletics Stadium
- Dates: July 22 – July 23
- Competitors: 15 from 10 nations
- Winning time: 51.27

Medalists
Gold medal	Kendall Baisden	United States
Silver medal	Shakima Wimbley	United States
Bronze medal	Kineke Alexander	Saint Vincent and the Grenadines

The women's 400 metres sprint competition of the athletics events at the 2015 Pan American Games took place between July 22nd and 23rd at the CIBC Pan Am and Parapan Am Athletics Stadium in Toronto, Canada. The defending Pan American Games champion is Jennifer Padilla of Colombia.

== Records ==
Prior to this competition, the existing world and Pan American Games records were as follows:

World record	Marita Koch (GDR)	47.60	Canberra, Australia	6 October 1985
Pan American Games record	Ana Fidelia Quirot (CUB)	49.61	Havana, Cuba	August 5, 1991

== Qualification ==
Each National Olympic Committee (NOC) was able to enter up to two entrants providing they had met the minimum standard (52.94) in the qualifying period (January 1, 2014 to June 28, 2015).

== Schedule ==
Date	Time	Round
July 22, 2015	10:30	Semifinals
July 23, 2015	19:10	Final

== Results ==
All times shown are in seconds.

KEY:	q	Fastest non-qualifiers	Q	Qualified	NR	National record	PB	Personal best	SB	Seasonal best	DQ	Disqualified

=== Semifinals ===
Rank	Heat	Name	Nationality	Time	Notes
1	2	Kendall Baisden	United States	51.81	Q
2	2	Kineke Alexander	Saint Vincent and the Grenadines	52.24	Q
3	1	Shakima Wimbley	United States	52.28	Q
4	1	Geisa Coutinho	Brazil	52.46	Q
5	2	Chrisann Gordon	Jamaica	52.47	Q
6	1	Daisurami Bonne	Cuba	52.90	Q, SB
7	1	Anastasia Le-Roy	Jamaica	53.13	q
8	2	Lisneidy Veitia	Cuba	53.59	q
9	2	Taylor Sharpe	Canada	53.82	
10	2	Nercely Soto	Venezuela	54.24	SB
11	1	Audrey Jean-Baptiste	Canada	54.27	
12	1	Lanece Clarke	Bahamas	54.33	
13	1	Janeil Bellille	Trinidad and Tobago	54.41	
	2	Joelma Sousa	Brazil	DNF	
	1	Marlena Wesh	Haiti	DNF	

=== Final ===
Rank	Name	Nationality	Time	Notes
1st place, gold medalist(s)	Kendall Baisden	United States	51.27	
2nd place, silver medalist(s)	Shakima Wimbley	United States	51.36	
3rd place, bronze medalist(s)	Kineke Alexander	Saint Vincent and the Grenadines	51.50	
4	Chrisann Gordon	Jamaica	51.75	
5	Anastasia Le-Roy	Jamaica	52.05	
6	Geisa Coutinho	Brazil	52.05	
7	Daisurami Bonne	Cuba	52.28	SB
8	Lisneidy Veitia	Cuba	52.44	SB
