= Janeil Bellille =

Trinidadian hurdler (born 1989)

Personal information
- Born: June 18, 1989 (age 37) Chaguanas, Trinidad and Tobago
- Education: Texas A&M University
- Height: 1.63 m (5 ft 4 in)
- Weight: 59 kg (130 lb)

Sport
- Country: Trinidad and Tobago
- Sport: Athletics
- Event: 400 m hurdles
- College team: Texas A&M Aggies (2010-14)

Janeil Candis Bellille (born 18 June 1989) is a Trinidadian hurdler. She represented her country at the 2012 and 2016 Summer Olympics.

== International competitions ==
Year	Competition	Venue	Position	Event	Notes
Representing Trinidad and Tobago
2005	World Youth Championships	Marrakesh, Morocco	19th (h)	400 m	56.78
2005	World Youth Championships	Marrakesh, Morocco	–	Medley relay	DQ
2006	CARIFTA Games (U20)	Les Abymes, Guadeloupe	4th	400 m	54.86
2006	CARIFTA Games (U20)	Les Abymes, Guadeloupe	2nd	400 m hurdles	59.76
2006	CARIFTA Games (U20)	Les Abymes, Guadeloupe	3rd	4 × 100 m relay	45.72
2006	CARIFTA Games (U20)	Les Abymes, Guadeloupe	2nd	4 × 400 m relay	3:45.13
2006	Central American and Caribbean; Junior Championships (U20)	Port of Spain, Trinidad and Tobago	3rd	400 m	56.15
2006	Central American and Caribbean; Junior Championships (U20)	Port of Spain, Trinidad and Tobago	2nd	400 m hurdles	60.03
2006	Central American and Caribbean; Junior Championships (U20)	Port of Spain, Trinidad and Tobago	2nd	4 × 400 m relay	3:42.31
2007	CARIFTA Games (U20)	Providenciales, Turks and Caicos Islands	3rd	400 m	54.37
2007	CARIFTA Games (U20)	Providenciales, Turks and Caicos Islands	3rd	400 m hurdles	59.88
2007	Pan American Junior Championships (U20)	São Paulo, Brazil	7th (h)	400 m	54.02^{1}
2007	Pan American Junior Championships (U20)	São Paulo, Brazil	2nd	400 m hurdles	56.94
2007	Pan American Junior Championships (U20)	São Paulo, Brazil	2nd	4 × 400 m relay	3:35.28
2007	Pan American Games	Rio de Janeiro, Brazil	7th	400 m	57.42
2007	Pan American Games	Rio de Janeiro, Brazil	7th	4 × 400 m relay	3:39.67
2008	CARIFTA Games (U20)	Basseterre, Saint Kitts and Nevis	1st	400 m	53.57
2008	CARIFTA Games (U20)	Basseterre, Saint Kitts and Nevis	1st	400 m hurdles	58.08
2008	CARIFTA Games (U20)	Basseterre, Saint Kitts and Nevis	2nd	4 × 400 m relay	3:43.65
2008	World Junior Championships	Bydgoszcz, Poland	2nd	400 m	56.84
2008	World Junior Championships	Bydgoszcz, Poland	10th (h)	4 × 400 m relay	3:38.14
2010	NACAC U23 Championships	Miramar, United States	4th	400 m hurdles	56.95
2010	Central American and Caribbean Games	Mayagüez, Puerto Rico	2nd	400 m hurdles	56.81
2010	Central American and Caribbean Games	Mayagüez, Puerto Rico	3rd	4 × 400 m relay	3:35.66
2012	Olympic Games	London, United Kingdom	31st (h)	400 m hurdles	57.27
2014	Commonwealth Games	Glasgow, United Kingdom	9th (h)	400 m hurdles	57.51
2014	Commonwealth Games	Glasgow, United Kingdom	6th	4 × 400 m relay	3:33.50
2015	IAAF World Relays	Nassau, Bahamas	4th (B)	4 × 400 m relay	3:35.23
2015	Pan American Games	Toronto, Canada	13th (h)	400 m	54.41
2015	Pan American Games	Toronto, Canada	7th	4 × 400 m relay	3:33.31
2016	Olympic Games	Rio de Janeiro, Brazil	16th (sf)	400 m hurdles	56.06
2018	Central American and Caribbean Games	Barranquilla, Colombia	9th (h)	400 m hurdles	57.25
2018	NACAC Championships	Toronto, Canada	10th (h)	400 m hurdles	58.81

^{1}Did not finish in the final

== Personal bests ==
Outdoor

- 400 metres – 51.83 (Port of Spain 2014)
- 400 metres hurdles – 55.41 (Fayetteville 2014)

Indoor

- 200 metres – 23.87 (College Station 2014)
- 400 metres – 52.58 (College Station 2014)
