= Gilda Casanova =

Cuban sprinter (born 1995)

Personal information
- Born: 19 December 1995 (age 30) Nueva Gerona, Cuba

Sport
- Sport: Track and field
Medal record
Representing Cuba
World Junior Championships
Silver medal – second place	2014 Eugene	400 metres
Central American and Caribbean Games
Gold medal – first place	2014 Veracruz	4x400m relay
Gold medal – first place	2018 Barranquilla	4x400m relay

Gilda Isabelis Casanova (born December 19, 1995) is a Cuban sprinter who specializes in the 400 metres.

She won the silver medal at the 2014 World Junior Championships and finished fifth (in the 800 metres) at the 2015 NACAC Championships.

In the 4 × 400 metres relay she won a gold medal at the 2014 Central American and Caribbean Games, finished fourth at the 2015 Pan American Games, and won another gold medal at the 2018 Central American and Caribbean Games. She also competed at the 2016 Summer Olympics. In the 4 × 800 metres relay she finished fourth at the 2015 IAAF World Relays.

Her personal best times are 52.28 seconds in the 400 metres, achieved in May 2014 in Port of Spain; and 2:02.50 minutes in the 800 metres, achieved in June 2014 in Havana.
