= Athletics at the 2015 Pan American Games – Women's 4 × 400 metres relay =

Women's 4 × 400 metres relay at the 2015 Pan American Games
- Venue: CIBC Pan Am and Parapan Am Athletics Stadium
- Dates: July 24–25
- Competitors: 51 from 12 nations
- Winning time: 3:25.68

Medalists
Gold medal	Shamier Little; Kyra Jefferson; Shakima Wimbley; Kendall Baisden; Alysia Montaño	United States
Silver medal	Anastasia Le-Roy; Verone Chambers; Chrisann Gordon; Bobby-Gaye Wilkins	Jamaica
Bronze medal	Brianne Theisen-Eaton; Taylor Sharpe; Sage Watson; Sarah Wells; Audrey Jean-Baptiste	Canada

The women's 4 × 400 metres sprint competition of the athletics events at the 2015 Pan American Games took place between the 24 and 25 of July at the CIBC Pan Am and Parapan Am Athletics Stadium. The defending Pan American Games champions were Aymée Martínez, Diosmely Peña, Susana Clement, Daisurami Bonne of Cuba.

== Records ==
Prior to this competition, the existing world and Pan American Games records were as follows:

World record	Soviet Union	3:15.17	Seoul, South Korea	October 1, 1988
Pan American Games record	United States	3:23.35	Indianapolis, United States	August 16, 1987

== Qualification ==
Each National Olympic Committee (NOC) ranked in the world's top 16 was able to enter one team.

== Schedule ==
Date	Time	Round
July 24, 2015	12:00	Semifinals
July 25, 2015	21:45	Final

== Results ==
All times shown are in seconds.

KEY:	q	Fastest non-qualifiers	Q	Qualified	NR	National record	PB	Personal best	SB	Seasonal best	DQ	Disqualified

=== Semifinals ===
Rank	Heat	Nation	Name	Time	Notes
1	2	United States	Shamier Little, Alysia Montaño, Shakima Wimbley, Kendall Baisden	3:26.40	Q
2	1	Cuba	Lisneidy Veitia, Yameisi Borlot, Gilda Casanova, Daisurami Bonne	3:28.15	Q, SB
3	2	Jamaica	Anastasia Le-Roy, Verone Chambers, Chrisann Gordon, Bobby-Gaye Wilkins	3:30.29	Q
4	2	Canada	Audrey Jean-Baptiste, Taylor Sharpe, Sage Watson, Sarah Wells	3:30.61	Q
5	1	Bahamas	Lanece Clarke, Christine Amertil, Shakeitha Henfield, Katrina Seymour	3:31.18	Q, SB
6	2	Trinidad and Tobago	Janeil Bellille, Romona Modeste, Alena Brooks, Sparkle McKnight	3:31.21	q, SB
7	1	Barbados	Nadia Cummins, Sada Williams, Sade Sealy, Tia-Adana Belle	3:31.72	Q, SB
8	1	Puerto Rico	Carol Rodríguez, Alethia Marrero, Grace Claxton, Pariis García	3:32.04	q, SB
9	2	Mexico	Natali Brito, Gabriela Medina, Paola Moran, Zudikey Rodríguez	3:32.29	SB
10	2	Brazil	Geisa Coutinho, Flávia de Lima, Liliane Fernandes, Jailma de Lima	3:34.97	
11	1	Venezuela	Nercely Soto, Wilmary Álvarez, Magdalena Mendoza, Maryuri Valdez	3:39.01	
12	1	Chile	Carmen Mansilla, Paula Goñi, Fernanda Mackenna, Javiera Errázuriz	3:41.35	

=== Final ===
Rank	Lane	Nation	Athletes	Time	Notes
1st place, gold medalist(s)	6	United States	Shamier Little, Kyra Jefferson, Shakima Wimbley, Kendall Baisden	3:25.68	
2nd place, silver medalist(s)	4	Jamaica	Anastasia Le-Roy, Verone Chambers, Chrisann Gordon, Bobby-Gaye Wilkins	3:27.27	
3rd place, bronze medalist(s)	8	Canada	Brianne Theisen-Eaton, Taylor Sharpe, Sage Watson, Sarah Wells	3:27.74	SB
4	5	Cuba	Lisneidy Veitia, Yameisi Borlot, Gilda Casanova, Daisurami Bonne	3:31.22	
5	3	Bahamas	Lanece Clarke, Christine Amertil, Carmiesha Cox, Katrina Seymour	3:31.60	
6	2	Puerto Rico	Carol Rodríguez, Alethia Marrero, Grace Claxton, Pariis García	3:33.16	
7	1	Trinidad and Tobago	Janeil Bellille, Romona Modeste, Alena Brooks, Sparkle McKnight	3:33.31	
	7	Barbados	Nadia Cummins, Sada Williams, Sade Sealy, Tia-Adana Belle	DSQ	
