= Ariane Nel =

South African sprinter

Personal information
- Nationality: South African
- Born: 6 March 1996 (age 29)

Sport
- Sport: Sprinting
- Event: 4 × 400 metres

Ariane Nel (born 6 March 1996) is a South African sprinter. She competed in the women's 4 × 400 metres relay at the 2017 World Championships in Athletics.
