= Helena Jiranová =

Czech athletics competitor (born 1995)

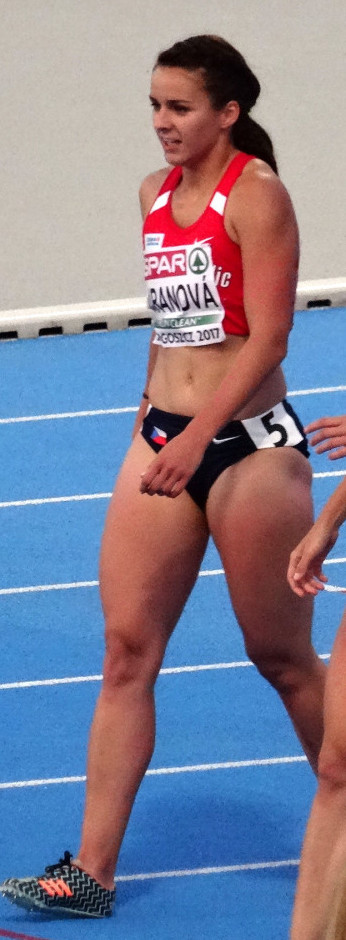
- Jiranová competing in 2017

Personal information
- Born: 5 March 1995 (age 31) Prague, Czech Republic

Sport
- Sport: Athletics
- Events: 400 meters, 110 meter hurdles and 60 meter hurdles

Helena Jiranová (born 5 March 1995) is a Czech runner and sprinter who participates in the 400 metres, 110 metres hurdles and 60 metres hurdles.

Jiranová entered international athletics in 2011 competing in the 2011 European Youth Summer Olympic Festival in Trabzon, Turkey. At the 2013 European Athletics Junior Championships she finished eighth in the 4 × 400 metres relay. In 2015 she reached the semi-finals at the 2015 European Athletics Junior Championships finishing seventh. During the 2017 European Athletics U23 Championships Jiranová finished eighth in the 400 metres dash and sixth in the 100 metres hurdles. In 2019 at the 2019 European Games she finished twelfth in the field of hurdlers and later in 2019 at the 2019 Summer Universiade she retired in the lead of the 110 metres hurdles after a stumble and ended up placing sixth.

Jiranová is a Czech champion in the 400 metres in 2014 and 2019, the 4 × 400 metres relay in 2019, and the 60 metres hurdles in 2019.

== Personal bests ==
- 400 metres: 53.77 sec. on 26 May 2017 in Prague
- 100 metres hurdles: 13.37 sec. on 25 July 2017 in Tábor
- 60 metres hurdles: 8.31 sec on 16 February 2019 in Ostrava
