= Shakima Wimbley =

American sprinter

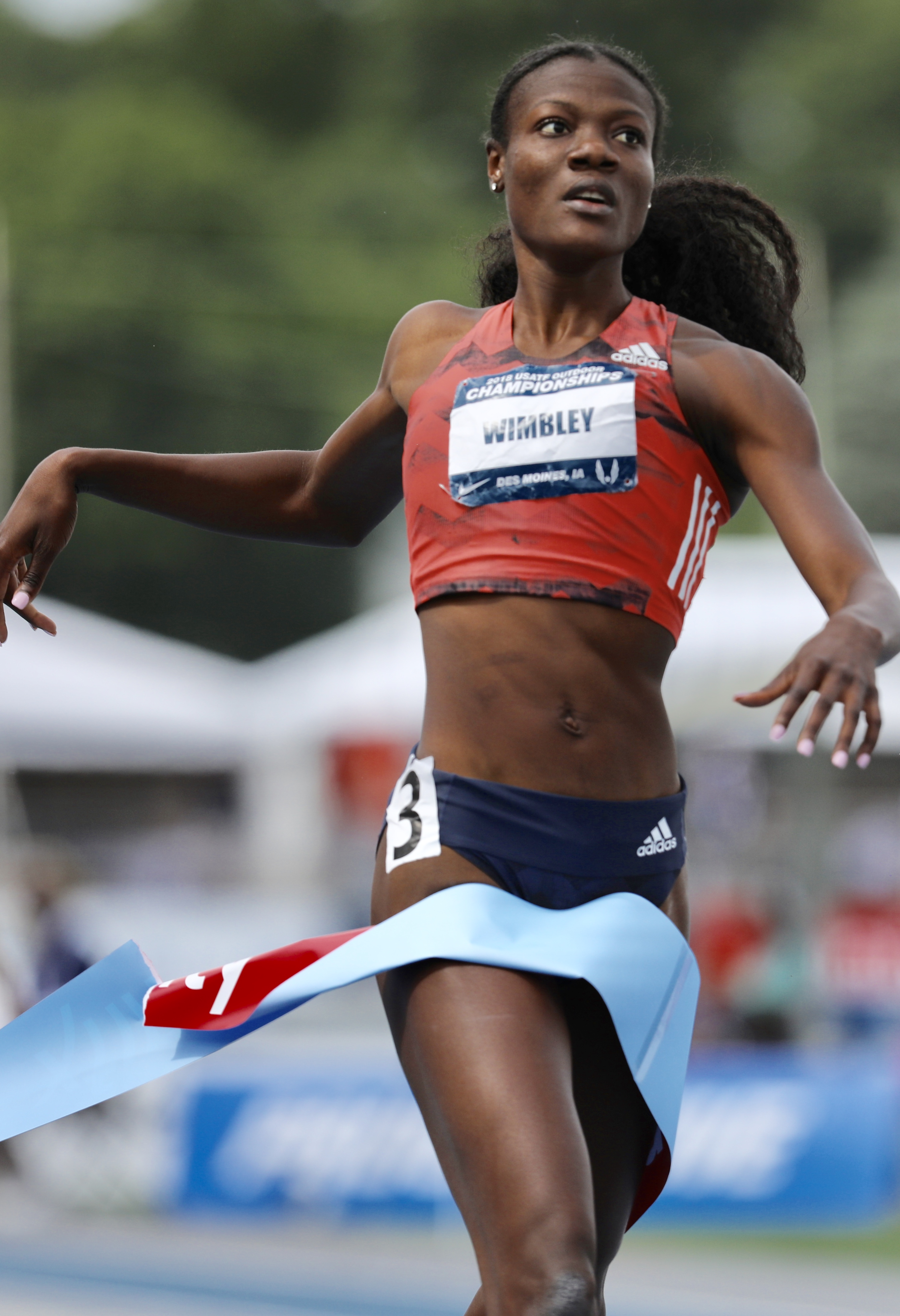
- Wimbley in 2018

Personal information
- Nationality: American
- Born: April 23, 1995 (age 31)

Sport
- Sport: Sprinting
- Event: 400 metres
Medal record
World Championships
Gold medal – first place	2017 London	4 × 400 m relay
World Indoor Championships
Gold medal – first place	2018 Birmingham	4 × 400 m relay
Silver medal – second place	2018 Birmingham	400 m

Shakima Wimbley (born April 23, 1995) is an American sprinter. She competed in the women's 4 × 400 metres relay at the 2017 World Championships in Athletics.

In college, Wimbley competed for the Miami Hurricanes track and field team. She won the NCAA Division I Women's Indoor Track and Field Championships in the 400 m.

== Competition record ==
Year	Competition	Venue	Position	Event	Notes
Representing United States
2014	World Junior Championships	Eugene, United States	1st	4 × 400 m relay	3:30.42
2015	Pan American Games	Toronto, Canada	2nd	400 m	51.36
2015	Pan American Games	Toronto, Canada	1st	4 × 400 m relay	3:25.68
2016	NACAC U23 Championships	San Salvador, El Salvador	6th	400 m	54.71
2016	NACAC U23 Championships	San Salvador, El Salvador	1st	4 × 400 m relay	3:28.45
2017	World Championships	London, United Kingdom	1st	4 × 400 m relay	3:19.02
2018	World Indoor Championships	Birmingham, United Kingdom	2nd	400 m	51.47
2018	World Indoor Championships	Birmingham, United Kingdom	1st	4 × 400 m relay	3:23.85
2019	World Relays	Yokohama, Japan	2nd	4 × 400 m relay	3:27.65
2019	World Championships	Doha, Qatar	23rd (sf)	400 m	1:13.55
