= Olivia Baker (runner) =

American middle-distance runner

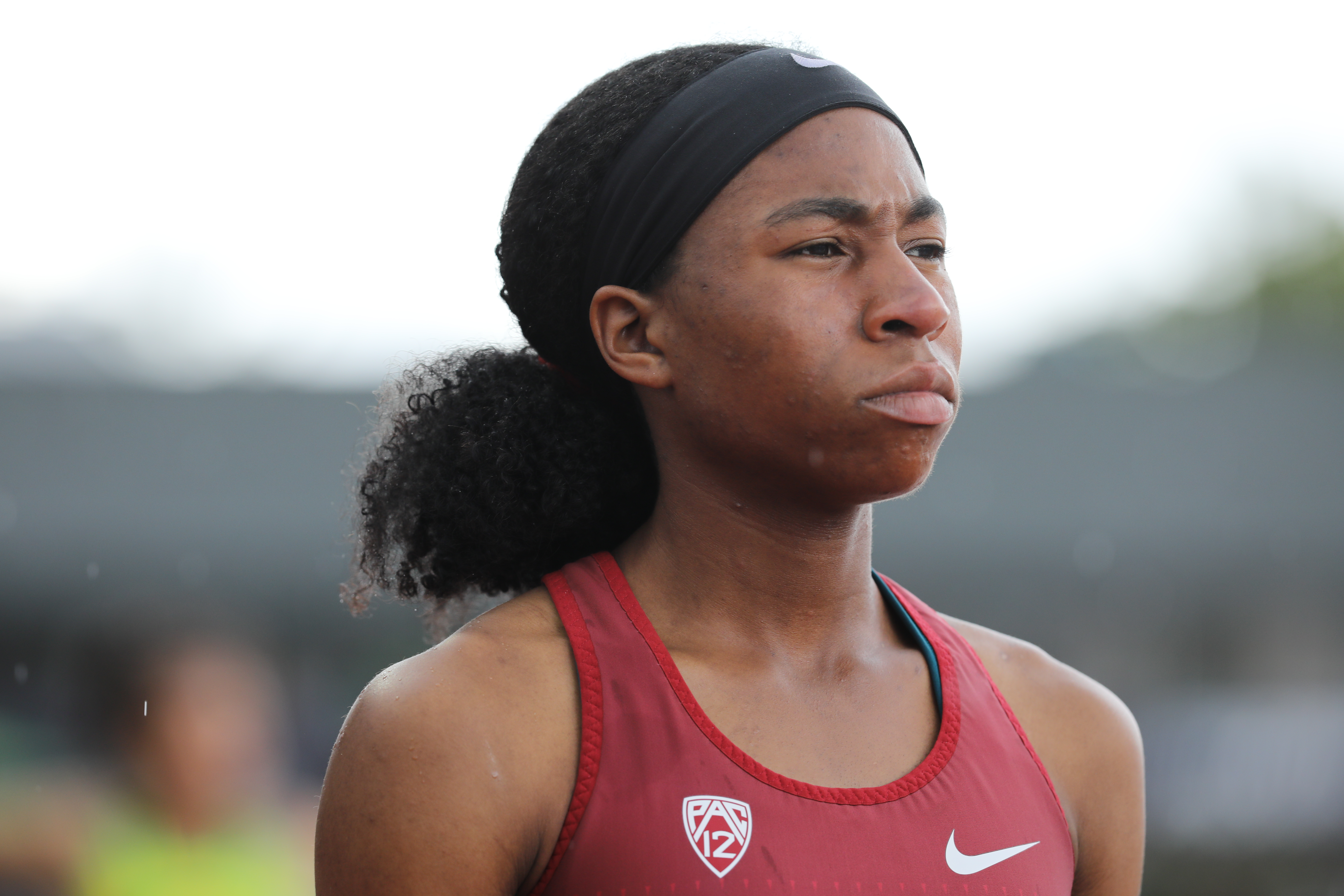
- Olivia Baker at 2018 NCAA Division I Outdoor Track and Field Championships

Personal information
- Nationality: American
- Born: June 12, 1996 (age 30)
- Home town: South Orange, New Jersey, U.S.
- Height: 5 ft 3 in (160 cm)
- Weight: 110 lb (50 kg)

Sport
- Sport: Track and field
- Event: 800 metres
- College team: Stanford University
- Club: Atlanta Track Club

Achievements and titles
- World finals: 2022; 800 m,
- Personal bests: 800 m: 1:58.05 (Monaco 2022); 400 m: 52.46 (Eugene 2014); 100 m: 12.05 (South Plainfield 2013); Indoors; 800 m: 2:00.33 (New York 2022)
Medal record
Women's track and field
Representing the United States
World Athletics Indoor Championships
	2022 Belgrade	800 m
World Athletics Relays
Gold medal – first place	2019 Yokohama	4x400 m Relay Mixed
The Match Europe v USA
	2019 Minsk	800 m
NACAC U23 Championships
	2016 San Salvador	800 m
Pan American U20 Athletics Championships
Gold medal – first place	2015 Edmonton	4x400 m
World Junior Championships
Bronze medal – third place	2014 Eugene	400 m
Gold medal – first place	2014 Eugene	4x400 m
World Youth Championships
Gold medal – first place	2013 Donetsk	Sprint Medley Relay
Silver medal – second place	2013 Donetsk	400 m

Olivia Baker (born June 12, 1996) is an American middle-distance runner who specializes in the 800 meters. Raised in South Orange, New Jersey, Baker attended Columbia High School, Baker graduated from Stanford University.

== High school career ==
Baker was a stand out athlete at Columbia High School. During her time there she never lost a 400 to anyone from New Jersey and won 13 state titles. She also anchored Columbia to a state 4x400 record of 3:40.36 and ran on the sprint medley relay that recorded the No. 2 U.S. high school time ever. In 2013, she became the first to win four events the same year at the New Jersey Meet of Champions, capturing state titles in the 100, 200, 400, and anchoring the 4x400. That same season she also won the 2013 New Balance Outdoor Nationals title in the 400. She was a two-time New Jersey Gatorade Girls Track and Field Athlete of the Year.

While in high school Baker also got to compete for the United States. At the 2013 World U18 Championships she finished 2nd in the 400m and was on the winning Medley relay team. At the 2014 World U20 Championships she finished 3rd in the 400m and was part of the winning 4 × 400 m relay team.

== Collegiate career ==
Baker ran at Stanford and was a 11-Time All-American, the 2016 Pac-12 400 champion, and the 2016 West Region Track Athlete of Year. In 2015 she was on the winning 4 × 400 m team at the Pan Am U20 Championships.

== Professional career ==
Baker runs for the Atlanta Track Club where she also works as the coordinator for marketing and membership engagement. In May 2019 she was in the winning mixed 4 × 400 m team at the IAAF World Relays. In 2022 she ran the 800m at the World Athletics Indoor Championships.

== Achievements ==
Representing the United States
Year	Competition	Venue	Position	Event	Notes
2022	2022 USA Outdoor Track and Field Championships	Eugene, Oregon	5th	800 m	1:58.63
2022	2022 World Athletics Indoor Championships	Belgrade, Serbia	H1 6th	800 m	2:02.35
2022	2022 USA Indoor Track and Field Championships	Spokane, Washington	2nd	800 m	2:02.14
2021	United States Olympic trials	Eugene, Oregon	28th	800 m	2:03.33
2020	2020 USA Indoor Track and Field Championships	Albuquerque, New Mexico	4th	800 m	2:03.56
2019	2019 USA Outdoor Track and Field Championships	Eugene, Oregon	4th	800 m	2:00.94
2019	2019 USA Indoor Track and Field Championships	Staten Island, New York	3rd	600 m	1:26.93
2018	2018 USA Outdoor Track and Field Championships	Des Moines, Iowa	6th	800 m	2:00.08
2017	United States World trials	Sacramento, California	18th	800 m	2:05.41
2016	United States Olympic trials	Eugene, Oregon	10th	800 m	2:01.87
2015	USATF U20 Outdoor Championships	Eugene, Oregon	3rd	400 m	53.28
2014	USATF U20 Outdoor Championships	Eugene, Oregon	2nd	400 m	52.46
2014	New Balance Nationals Outdoor	Greensboro, North Carolina	1st	800 m	2:06.01
2013	2013 United States World Youth Trials (track and field)	Edwardsville, Illinois	6th	800 m	2:20.85
2013	2013 United States World Youth Trials (track and field)	Edwardsville, Illinois	1st	400 m	54.41
2013	New Balance Nationals Outdoor	Greensboro, North Carolina	1st	4x400 m	3:40.36
2013	New Balance Nationals Outdoor	Greensboro, North Carolina	1st	4x800 m	9:01.12
2013	New Balance Indoor Nationals	New York City	1st	4x400 m	3:42.03
2012	New Balance Nationals Outdoor	Greensboro, North Carolina	3rd	400 m	54.83
2012	New Balance Indoor Nationals	New York City	2nd	400 m	54.61
2012	New Balance Indoor Nationals	New York City	24th	4x200 m	1:48.10
2011	New Balance Nationals Outdoor	Greensboro, North Carolina	4th	Sprint Medley Relay; 200-200-400-800 m	4:02.36
2011	New Balance Nationals Outdoor	Greensboro, North Carolina	4th	Sprint Medley Relay; 100-100-200-400 m	1:45.60
2011	New Balance Nationals Outdoor	Greensboro, North Carolina	8th	4x200 m	1:40.15
2011	New Balance Nationals Outdoor	Greensboro, North Carolina	8th	400 m	55.13
2011	New Balance Indoor Nationals	New York City	10th	400 m	56.35
2011	New Balance Indoor Nationals	New York City	4th	4x200 m	1:39.37
2010	New Balance Indoor Nationals	New York City	1st	400 m	57.01
