= Chrisann Gordon =

Jamaican athlete (born 1994)

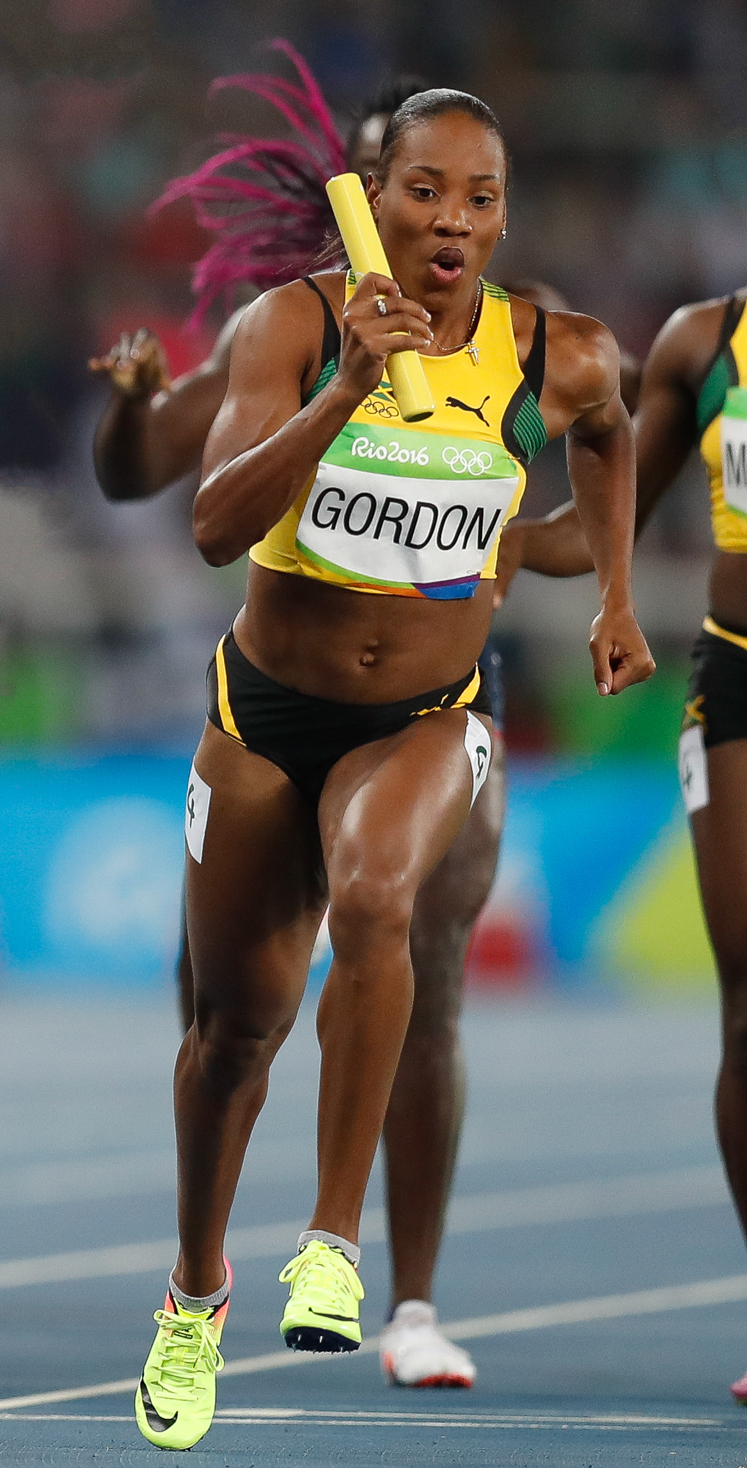
- Gordon at the 2016 Olympics

Personal information
- Full name: Chrisann Gordon-Powell
- Nationality: Jamaican
- Born: 18 September 1994 (age 32)
- Education: University of Texas at Austin

Sport
- Country: Jamaica
- Sport: Track and field
- Events: 400 metres and 800 metres
- College team: Texas Longhorns
Medal record
Olympic Games
Silver medal – second place	2016 Rio de Janeiro	4 × 400 m relay
World Championships
Gold medal – first place	2015 Beijing	4 × 400 m relay
Pan American Games
Silver medal – second place	2015 Toronto	4 × 400 m relay
World Junior Championships
Bronze medal – third place	2010 Moncton	4 × 400 m relay
NACAC U23 Championships
Gold medal – first place	2016 San Salvador	400 m
Silver medal – second place	2016 San Salvador	4 × 400 m relay
Pan American Junior Games
Gold medal – first place	2011 Miramar	400 m
World Youth Championships
Gold medal – first place	2011 Lille	Medley relay
Central American and Caribbean Junior Championships (U17)
Silver medal – second place	2010 Santo Domingo	400 m}

Chrisann Gordon (born 18 September 1994) is a Jamaican sprinter. She competed in the 4 × 400 metres relay at the 2015 World Championships in Beijing. She also competed at the Rio 2016 Summer Olympics in the 4 × 400 metres relay when Jamaica won silver.

== Competition record ==
Year	Competition	Venue	Position	Event	Notes
Representing Jamaica
2009	CARIFTA Games (U17)	Vieux Fort, Saint Lucia	1st	800 m	2:11.43
2009	CARIFTA Games (U17)	Vieux Fort, Saint Lucia	1st	4 × 400 m	3:38:09
2010	Central American and Caribbean; Junior Championships (U17)	Santo Domingo, Dominican Republic	2nd	400 m	54.13
2010	World Junior Championships	Moncton, Canada	3rd	4 × 400 m	3:32.24
2011	CARIFTA Games (U20)	Montego Bay, Jamaica	2nd	400 m	52.74
2011	CARIFTA Games (U20)	Montego Bay, Jamaica	1st	4 × 400 m	3:31.47
2011	World Youth Championships	Barcelona, Spain	7th	400 m	53.31
2011	World Youth Championships	Barcelona, Spain	1st	Medley relay	2:03.42
2011	Pan American Junior Championships	Miramar, United States	1st	400 m	52.62
2012	World Junior Championships	Barcelona, Spain	7th	400 m	52.31
2013	CARIFTA Games (U20)	Nassau, Bahamas	2nd	400 m	53.22
2013	CARIFTA Games (U20)	Nassau, Bahamas	1st	4 × 400 m	3:34.36
2013	Central American and Caribbean Championships	Morelia, Mexico	2nd	400 m	52.52
2013	Central American and Caribbean Championships	Morelia, Mexico	–	4 × 400 m	DQ
2014	World Relays	Nassau, Bahamas	5th	4 × 800 m	8:17.22
2015	Pan American Games	Toronto, Canada	4th	400 m	51.75
2015	Pan American Games	Toronto, Canada	2nd	4 × 400 m	3:27.27
2015	World Championships	Beijing, China	3rd (h)	4 × 400 m	3:23.62
2016	World Indoor Championships	Portland, United States	–	400 m	DNF
2016	World Indoor Championships	Portland, United States	–	4 × 400 m	DNF
2016	NACAC U23 Championships	San Salvador, El Salvador	1st	400 m	51.02 CR
2016	NACAC U23 Championships	San Salvador, El Salvador	2nd	4 × 400 m	3:32.06
2016	Olympic Games	Rio de Janeiro, Brazil	2nd (h)	4 × 400 m	3:22.38
2017	World Championships	London, United Kingdom	10th (sf)	400 m	50.87
2017	World Championships	London, United Kingdom	2nd (h)	4 × 400 m relay	3:23.64^{1}
2019	World Relays	Yokohama, Japan	5th	4 × 400 m relay	3:28.30
2022	World Championships	Eugene, United States	26th (h)	800 m	2:01.91

^{1}Did not finish in the final

== Personal bests ==
Outdoor

- 100 metres – 11.87 (+0.8 m/s, Kingston 2011)
- 200 metres – 23.28 (+2.0 m/s, El Paso 2015)
- 400 metres – 50.13 (Kingston, Jamaica 2017)
- 800 metres - 1:59.52 (Nashville, Tennessee 2022)

Indoor

- 200 metres – 23.90 (Albuquerque 2015)
- 400 metres – 51.69 (Birmingham 2016)
