= Madeline Price =

Canadian sprinter (born 1995)

Personal information
- Full name: Madeline Jane Price
- Nickname: Maddy
- Nationality: Canadian
- Born: 11 September 1995 (age 30) Palo Alto, California, U.S.

Sport
- Sport: Athletics
- Event: Sprinting
- University team: Duke Blue Devils

Madeline Jane "Maddy" Price (born 11 September 1995) is a Canadian athlete. A specialist in the 400 metres distance, she competes as part of the Canadian relay team. In her inaugural World Championships appearance at the 2019 World Athletics Championships in Doha, she was a participant in the mixed 4 × 400 metres relay. As a part of the women's 4 × 400 m relay team in the same championships, the Canadian team was disqualified in the final. She went on to compete as part of the Canadian Olympic team at the 2020 Summer Olympics in Tokyo. The 4 × 400 m relay team finished in fourth place.
