= Emily Lawson =

British management consultant

Dame Emily Lawson DBE
- Born: 1966 or 1967 (age 59–60)
- Education: Gonville and Caius College, Cambridge; University of East Anglia; University of Oxford; University of Pennsylvania
- Scientific career
- Workplaces: NHS England
- Thesis: Molecular and genetic analysis of a modified Ac transposon in Arabidopsis. (1993)

Dame Emily Jane Ruth Lawson (born 1966/67) is a British management consultant and former Chief Operating Officer (COO) of NHS England. She has been the COO of management consultancy Newton Consulting since October 2025. Lawson led the initial rollout of the NHS COVID-19 vaccine programme in 2020 and the subsequent booster programme in 2021. Prior to this, she worked for McKinsey & Company, Morrisons, and Kingfisher plc in human resources.

== Early life and education ==
Lawson grew up in London. She is Jewish. She studied Natural Sciences at Gonville and Caius College, Cambridge, graduating with a first in 1989. While there she was president of the Caius Science Society in her final year. She then completed a doctorate in molecular genetics at the John Innes Centre, University of East Anglia, with a thesis on transposons in Arabidopsis in 1993. After this, she undertook a two-year postdoctoral fellowship at the University of Pennsylvania and then worked as a technology and business development manager at the biotech firm Avitech Diagnostics for two years.

== Career ==
Lawson obtained an MBA at Saïd Business School, University of Oxford in 1998. She joined management consultancy McKinsey & Company in the same year. Lawson was promoted to partner at the firm's London office and led its human capital practice across Europe, Middle East, and Africa, and co-wrote its 2012 report Women Matter 2012: Making the Breakthrough on improving gender diversity in business. She joined supermarket chain Morrisons as their group Human Resources Director in September 2013. Lawson left the company in 2015, and joined Kingfisher plc as their Chief People Officer. She left Kingfisher plc after a year.

In November 2017, Lawson joined NHS England as their National Director for Transformation and Corporate Operations. She was responsible for business transformation and the integration of NHS Improvement into the organisation. Lawson was promoted to Chief Commercial Officer (CCO) in early 2020. She left this role to become the Senior Responsible Officer for the NHS COVID-19 vaccine deployment programme in November 2020 and led its initial rollout. She was seconded to lead Prime Minister Boris Johnson's Delivery Unit for the summer of 2021 before returning to lead the vaccine booster programme in October 2021. Lawson returned to lead the unit in 2022. She left this role in August 2023 and returned to NHS England in October 2023 as its interim Chief Operating Officer (COO) replacing Jim Mackey. She left NHS England in March 2025 and received a redundancy payment of between £175,000 and £180,000. She became COO of management consultancy Newton Consulting in October 2025.

Lawson was appointed Dame Commander of the Order of the British Empire (DBE) in the 2022 New Year Honours for services to the NHS, particularly during the COVID-19 pandemic. She is a founding member of and deputy chair of the 30% Club which aims to improve gender diversity in business.

== Selected publications ==
- Scheres, B.; Wolkenfelt, H.; Willemsen, V.; Terlouw, M.; Lawson, E.; Dean, C.; Weisbeek, P. (1 September 1994). "Embryonic origin of the Arabidopsis primary root and root meristem initials". Development. 120 (9): 2475–2487. doi:10.1242/dev.120.9.2475. hdl:1874/12641. ISSN 1477-9129.
- Guthridge, Matthew; Komm, Asmus B.; Lawson, Emily (2008). Making talent a strategic priority (PDF). McKinsey.
- Lawson, Emily; Price, Colin (2003). The psychology of change management (PDF). McKinsey.
