= Cheriece Hylton =

English sprinter

Personal information
- Born: 19 December 1996 (age 29)
- Height: 1.75 m (5 ft 9 in)
- Weight: 60 kg (132 lb)

Sport
- Sport: Athletics
- Event(s): 400 m, 200 m
- Coached by: David Bruney (2011), John Blackie (2011-2016); Ryan Freckleton (2016-2018) Roy Dickens (2019-)

Cheriece Hylton (born 19 December 1996) is an English sprinter.

Hylton, who runs in the 200m and 400m, won a number of titles as a junior, including silver in the 400m and gold in the 4 × 400 m relay at the 2015 European Junior Championships, silver at the Sainsbury's Indoor British Championships in the 200m, and silver in the 2014 World Junior Championships 4 × 400 m relay. She was invited to the 2018 Commonwealth Games in Australia as part of the 4 × 400 m relay squad.

Her twin sister Shannon Hylton is also a sprinter.

== Early life and education ==
Hylton grew up in Chislehurst, London, England and attended Bullers Wood School for Girls in Chislehurst, where she took A Levels in ICT, PE and economics.

She studied Business Management at City University London and graduated with a bachelor's degree.

Hylton came from a background of dance and netball, but was inspired to take up running after seeing Katrina Johnson-Thompson at the 2012 London Olympics.

== Career ==
Hylton is a member of Blackheath and Bromley Harriers Athletic Club and is coached by Ryan Freckleton. Previously she was coached by John Blackie (2011–2016) who is also coach to Dina Asher-Smith, and prior to that by David Bruney (2011).

Hylton won silver in the World Junior Championships 4 × 400 m relay team. She went on to have a successful 2015, winning silver in the 400m at the European Junior Championships with a personal best of 53.16. She was also part of the gold medal-winning 4 × 400 m relay team at the Championships. In 2015, she was first in the 200m at the Loughborough International and won silver in the Sainsbury's Indoor British Championships in the 200m with a time of 23.80, being beaten by her sister Shannon Hylton who took gold.

In 2016, Hylton took some time out with injury.

She returned to the track in 2017, and decided to focus on the 400m. At the British Team Trials at the Alexander Stadium in Birmingham in July 2017, she ran a personal best of 52.88 in the heats, and went on to come fourth in the finals with a time of 52.98.

Hylton qualified for the 2018 Commonwealth Games as part of the 4 × 400 m relay squad with Emily Diamond, Finette Agyapong, Anyika Onuora, Perri Shakes-Drayton and Margaret Adeoye.

Hylton is a British Athletics Power of 10 athlete. Hylton, along with her sister Shannon, has been selected to be represented by Andy Murray's management agency, 77 Sports Management. She is sponsored by Under Armour.
