= 2014 World Junior Championships in Athletics =

Sportive competition

- Host city: (United States) Eugene, Oregon, USA
- Nations: 175
- Athletes: 1546
- Events: 44
- Dates: 22–27 July
- Opened by: Barack Obama
- Main venue: Hayward Field

The 2014 World Junior Championships in Athletics was an international athletics competition for athletes qualifying as juniors (born 1995 or later) which was held at the Hayward Field in Eugene, Oregon, USA, on 22–27 July 2014. A total of 44 athletics events were contested at the championships, 22 by male and 22 by female athletes. A total of 1546 athletes from 175 countries were participate.

Several medalists from the 2012 championships were eligible to defend their titles, including Wilhem Belocian, Ashraf Amgad Elseify, Falk Wendrich, Jessica Judd, Ana Peleteiro and Sofi Flinck.

== Men's results ==
=== Track ===
Event	Gold		Silver		Bronze	
100 m	Kendal Williams; United States	10.21; PB	Trayvon Bromell; United States	10.28	Yoshihide Kiryu; Japan	10.34
200 m	Trentavis Friday; United States	20.04w	Divine Oduduru; Nigeria	20.25w	Michael O'Hara; Jamaica	20.31w
400 m	Machel Cedenio; Trinidad and Tobago	45.13; WJL	Nobuya Kato; Japan	46.17; SB	Abbas Abubakar Abbas; Bahrain	46.20
800 m	Alfred Kipketer; Kenya	1:43.95; WJL	Joshua Tiampati Masikonde; Kenya	1:45.14; PB	Andreas Almgren; Sweden	1:45.65; NJR
1500 m	Jonathan Kiplimo Sawe; Kenya	3:40.02; SB	Abdi Waiss Mouhyadin; Djibouti	3:41.38	Hillary Cheruiyot Ngetich; Kenya	3:41.61; SB
5000 m	Yomif Kejelcha; Ethiopia	13:25.19; PB	Yasin Haji; Ethiopia	13:26.21; PB	Moses Letoyie; Kenya	13:28.11
10,000 m	Joshua Kiprui Cheptegei; Uganda	28:32.86	Elvis Kipchoge Cheboi; Kenya	28:35.20	Nicholas Mboroto Kosimbei; Kenya	28:38.68
110 m hurdles (99.0 cm)	Wilhem Belocian; France	12.99; WJR	Tyler Mason; Jamaica	13.06; AJR	David Omoregie; Great Britain	13.35
400 m hurdles	Jaheel Hyde; Jamaica	49.29; WJL	Ali Khamis Khamis; Bahrain	49.55; NJR	Tim Holmes; United States	50.07
3000 m steeplechase	Barnabas Kipyego; Kenya	8:25.57	Titus Kipruto Kibiego; Kenya	8:26.15	Evans Rutto Chematot; Bahrain	8:32.61; PB
4×100 m relay	United States; Jalen Miller; Trayvon Bromell; Kendal Williams; Trentavis Friday	38.70; WJL	Japan; Takuya Kawakami; Yoshihide Kiryu; Yuki Koike; Masaharu Mori	39.02; SB	Jamaica; Raheem Robinson; Michael O'Hara; Edward Clarke; Jevaughn Minzie	39.12; SB
4×400 m relay	United States; Josephus Lyles; Tyler Brown; Ricky Morgan; Michael Cherry	3:03.31; WJL	Japan; Julian Jrummi Walsh; Kaisei Yui; Takamasa Kitagawa; Nobuya Kato	3:04.11; AJR	Jamaica; Twayne Crooks; Martin Manley; Nathon Allen; Jaheel Hyde	3:04.47; SB
10,000 m walk	Daisuke Matsunaga; Japan	39:27.19; CR	Diego García; Spain	39:51.59; NJR	Paolo Yurivilca; Peru	40:02.07; NJR

=== Field ===
Event	Gold		Silver		Bronze	
High jump	Mikhail Akimenko; Russia	2.24; PB	Dzmitry Nabokau; Belarus	2.24; PB	Woo Sang-hyeok; South Korea	2.24; PB
Pole vault	Axel Chapelle; France	5.55; WJL	Daniil Kotov; Russia	5.50; PB	Oleg Zernikel; Germany	5.50; PB
Long jump	Wang Jianan; China	8.08	Lin Qing; China	7.94	Shotaro Shiroyama; Japan	7.83
Triple jump	Lázaro Martínez; Cuba	17.13; CR	Max Heß; Germany	16.55; PB	Mateus de Sá; Brazil	16.47; NJR
Shot put (6 kg)	Konrad Bukowiecki; Poland	22.06; WJL	Denzel Comenentia; Netherlands	20.17; PB	Braheme Days, Jr. United States	20.01
Discus throw (1.750 kg)	Martin Marković; Croatia	66.94; WJL	Henning Prüfer; Germany	64.18; PB	Sven Martin Skagestad; Norway	63.21
Hammer throw (6 kg)	Ashraf Amgad Elseify; Qatar	84.71; WJL	Bence Pásztor; Hungary	79.99	Ilya Terentyev; Russia	76.31
Javelin throw	Gatis Čakšs; Latvia	74.04; PB	Matija Muhar; Slovenia	72.97	Andrian Mardare; Moldova	72.81
Decathlon (junior)	Jiří Sýkora; Czech Republic	8135; CR	Cedric Dubler; Australia	8094; AJR	Tim Nowak; Germany	7980; NJR

== Women's results ==
=== Track ===
Event	Gold		Silver		Bronze	
100 m	Dina Asher-Smith; Great Britain	11.23	Ángela Tenorio; Ecuador	11.39	Kaylin Whitney; United States	11.45
200 m	Kaylin Whitney; United States	22.82	Irene Ekelund; Sweden	22.97	Ángela Tenorio; Ecuador	23.15
400 m	Kendall Baisden; United States	51.85	Gilda Casanova; Cuba	52.59	Olivia Baker; United States	53.00
800 m	Margaret Nyairera Wambui; Kenya	2:00.49; PB	Sahily Diago; Cuba	2:02.11	Georgia Wassall; Australia	2:02.71
1500 m	Dawit Seyaum; Ethiopia	4:09.86	Gudaf Tsegay; Ethiopia	4:10.83	Sheila Chepngetich Keter; Kenya	4:11.21; PB
3000 m	Mary Cain; United States	8:58.48; PB	Lilian Kasait Rengeruk; Kenya	9:00.53	Valentina Chepkwemoi Mateiko; Kenya	9:00.79; PB
5000 m	Alemitu Heroye; Ethiopia	15:10.08	Alemitu Hawi; Ethiopia	15:10.46; PB	Agnes Jebet Tirop; Kenya	15:43.12
100 m hurdles	Kendell Williams; United States	12.89; CR	Dior Hall; United States	12.92; PB	Nadine Visser; Netherlands	12.99; NJR
400 m hurdles	Shamier Little; United States	55.66	Shona Richards; Great Britain	56.16; NJR	Jade Miller; United States	56.22; PB
3000 m steeplechase	Ruth Jebet; Bahrain	9:36.74	Rosefline Chepngetich; Kenya	9:40.28; PB	Daisy Jepkemei; Kenya	9:47.65; SB
4×100 m relay	United States; Teahna Daniels; Ariana Washington; Jada Martin; Kaylin Whitney	43.46; WJL	Jamaica; Sashalee Forbes; Kedisha Dallas; Saqukine Cameron; Natalliah Whyte	43.97; SB	Germany; Lisa Marie Kwayie; Lisa Mayer; Gina Lückenkemper; Chantal Butzek	44.65; SB
4×400 m relay	United States; Shamier Little; Olivia Baker; Shakima Wimbley; Kendall Baisden	3:30.42; WJL	Great Britain; Shona Richards; Loren Bleaken; Sabrina Bakare; Cheriece Hylton	3:32.00; SB	Germany; Laura Müller; Hannah Mergenthaler; Laura Gläsner; Ann-Kathrin Kopf	3:33.02; SB
10,000 m walk	Anežka Drahotová; Czech Republic	42:47.25; WJR	Wang Na; China	44:02.64; PB	Ni Yuanyuan; China	44:16.72; PB

=== Field ===
Event	Gold		Silver		Bronze	
High jump	Morgan Lake; Great Britain	1.93	Michaela Hrubá; Czech Republic	1.91; NJR	Irina Ilieva; Russia	1.88
Pole vault	Alayna Lutkovskaya; Russia	4.50; CR	Desiree Freier; United States	4.45; AJR	Eliza McCartney; New Zealand	4.45; NR
Long jump	Akela Jones; Barbados	6.34	Nadia Akpana Assa; Norway	6.31	Maryse Luzolo; Germany	6.24
Triple jump	Rouguy Diallo; France	14.44	Liadagmis Povea; Cuba	14.07	Li Xiaohong; China	14.03
Shot put	Guo Tianqian; China	17.71	Raven Saunders; United States	16.63	Emel Dereli; Turkey	16.55
Discus throw	Izabela da Silva; Brazil	58.03; WJL	Valarie Allman; United States	56.75	Navjeet Kaur Dhillon; India	56.36; PB
Hammer throw	Al'ona Shamotina; Ukraine	66.05	Réka Gyurátz; Hungary	64.68	Iliana Korosidou; Greece	63.67
Javelin throw	Ekaterina Starygina; Russia	56.85; SB	Sofi Flink; Sweden	56.70	Sara Kolak; Croatia	55.74
Heptathlon	Morgan Lake; Great Britain	6148; PB	Yorgelis Rodríguez; Cuba	6006	Nadine Visser; Netherlands	5948

== Medal table ==
* Host nation (United States)

Rank	Nation	Gold	Silver	Bronze	Total
1	United States*	11	5	5	21
2	Kenya	4	5	7	16
3	Ethiopia	3	3	0	6
4	Great Britain	3	2	1	6
5	Russia	3	1	2	6
6	France	3	0	0	3
7	China	2	2	2	6
8	Czech Republic	2	1	0	3
9	Cuba	1	4	0	5
10	Japan	1	3	2	6
11	Jamaica	1	2	3	6
12	Bahrain	1	1	2	4
13	Brazil	1	0	1	2
13	Croatia	1	0	1	2
15	Barbados	1	0	0	1
15	Latvia	1	0	0	1
15	Poland	1	0	0	1
15	Qatar	1	0	0	1
15	Trinidad and Tobago	1	0	0	1
15	Uganda	1	0	0	1
15	Ukraine	1	0	0	1
22	Germany	0	2	5	7
23	Sweden	0	2	1	3
24	Hungary	0	2	0	2
25	Netherlands	0	1	2	3
26	Australia	0	1	1	2
26	Ecuador	0	1	1	2
26	Norway	0	1	1	2
29	Belarus	0	1	0	1
29	Djibouti	0	1	0	1
29	Nigeria	0	1	0	1
29	Slovenia	0	1	0	1
29	Spain	0	1	0	1
34	Greece	0	0	1	1
34	India	0	0	1	1
34	Moldova	0	0	1	1
34	New Zealand	0	0	1	1
34	Peru	0	0	1	1
34	South Korea	0	0	1	1
34	Turkey	0	0	1	1
Totals (40 entries)		44	44	44	132

== Participation ==
According to an unofficial count, 1411 athletes from 153 countries participated in the event. Registered athletes from Afghanistan, Burkina Faso, the Central African Republic, Chad, Côte d'Ivoire, Guinea-Bissau, Iraq and Libya did not show.

- Algeria (11)
- American Samoa (1)
- Andorra (1)
- Anguilla (1)
- Antigua and Barbuda (3)
- Argentina (6)
- Armenia (3)
- Aruba (1)
- Australia (56)
- Austria (10)
- Azerbaijan (2)
- Bahamas (22)
- Bahrain (7)
- Bangladesh (1)
- Barbados (9)
- Belarus (12)
- Belgium (15)
- Bermuda (1)
- Bolivia (2)
- Botswana (8)
- Brazil (22)
- British Virgin Islands (2)
- Bulgaria (1)
- Canada (40)
- Cayman Islands (1)
- Chile (4)
- China (25)
- Chinese Taipei (10)
- Colombia (11)
- DR Congo (1)
- Cook Islands (1)
- Costa Rica (1)
- Croatia (15)
- Cuba (18)
- Cyprus (7)
- Czech Republic (23)
- Denmark (6)
- Djibouti (2)
- Dominica (1)
- Dominican Republic (2)
- Ecuador (8)
- Egypt (5)
- El Salvador (1)
- Eritrea (4)
- Estonia (6)
- Ethiopia (21)
- Fiji (1)
- Finland (14)
- France (34)
- French Polynesia (1)
- Gabon (1)
- Georgia (1)
- Germany (56)
- Ghana (3)
- Gibraltar (1)
- Great Britain (43)
- Greece (11)
- Guam (1)
- Guatemala (3)
- Guyana (2)
- Hong Kong (2)
- Hungary (20)
- Iceland (5)
- India (7)
- Indonesia (1)
- Iran (1)
- Ireland (9)
- Israel (2)
- Italy (48)
- Jamaica (40)
- Japan (42)
- Kazakhstan (4)
- Kenya (26)
- Kiribati (1)
- Kuwait (1)
- Kyrgyzstan (1)
- Latvia (6)
- Lesotho (1)
- Liberia (1)
- Lithuania (11)
- Luxembourg (2)
- Macau (1)
- Macedonia (1)
- Madagascar (1)
- Malaysia (3)
- Maldives (1)
- Malta (1)
- Marshall Islands (1)
- Mauritania (1)
- Mauritius (1)
- Mexico (26)
- Federated States of Micronesia (1)
- Moldova (3)
- Monaco (1)
- Montenegro (2)
- Morocco (6)
- Mozambique (1)
- Namibia (1)
- Netherlands (18)
- New Zealand (3)
- Nicaragua (1)
- Nigeria (19)
- Norway (25)
- Oman (1)
- Pakistan (1)
- Panama (1)
- Papua New Guinea (1)
- Paraguay (1)
- Peru (8)
- Philippines (2)
- Poland (36)
- Portugal (10)
- Puerto Rico (9)
- Qatar (5)
- Romania (18)
- Russia (28)
- Saint Kitts and Nevis (2)
- Saint Vincent and the Grenadines (2)
- Samoa (1)
- San Marino (1)
- Saudi Arabia (3)
- Senegal (1)
- Serbia (1)
- Seychelles (1)
- Sierra Leone (1)
- Singapore (2)
- Slovakia (8)
- Slovenia (20)
- South Africa (24)
- South Korea (11)
- Spain (37)
- Sri Lanka (2)
- Suriname (1)
- Swaziland (1)
- Sweden (26)
- Switzerland (17)
- Thailand (9)
- Tonga (1)
- Trinidad and Tobago (19)
- Turkey (30)
- Turkmenistan (1)
- Turks and Caicos Islands (1)
- Uganda (4)
- Ukraine (21)
- United Arab Emirates (2)
- United States (85)
- Uruguay (2)
- U.S. Virgin Islands (1)
- Uzbekistan (3)
- Vanuatu (1)
- Venezuela (10)
- Zambia (4)
- Zimbabwe (3)
