= Laura Müller (sprinter) =

German sprinter (born 1995)

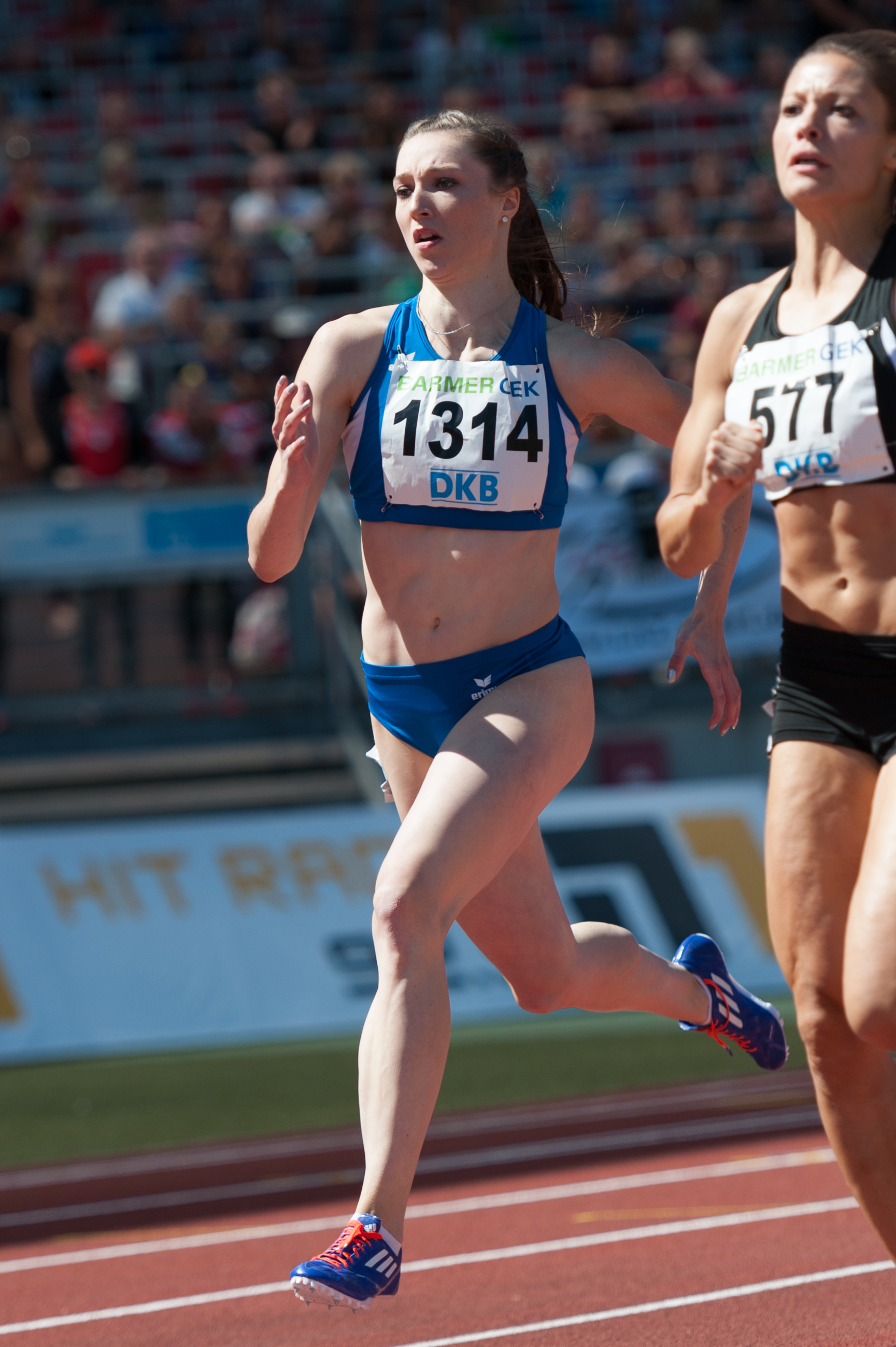
- Laura Müller in 2015

Personal information
- Nationality: German
- Born: 11 December 1995 (age 30) Dudweiler, Germany
- Height: 1.72 m (5 ft 8 in)
- Weight: 58 kg (128 lb)

Sport
- Country: Germany
- Sport: Track and field
- Event: 4×400 meters relay

Laura Marie Müller (born 11 December 1995) is a German sprinter. She competed in the 4×400 meters relay at the 2016 European Athletics Championships. At the 2016 Summer Olympics, she competed in the women's 4x400 meter relay.

== Education ==
Müller attended Gymnasium am Rotenbühl, and completed her abitur in 2015. She then began studying psychology at Saarland University.
