= 2015 European Athletics U23 Championships – Women's 4 × 400 metres relay =

The women's 4 × 400 metres relay event at the 2015 European Athletics U23 Championships was held in Tallinn, Estonia, at Kadriorg Stadium on 12 July.

== Medalists ==
Gold	Seren Bundy-Davies; Zoey Clark; Victoria Ohuruogu; Kirsten McAslan; United Kingdom
Silver	Małgorzata Curyło; Martyna Dąbrowska; Adrianna Janowicz; Patrycja Wyciszkiewicz; Poland
Bronze	Yana Glotova; Yuliya Spiridonova; Tatyana Zotova; Yekaterina Renzhina; Russia

== Results ==
=== Final ===
12 July

Rank	Name	Nationality	Reaction Time	Time	Notes
1st place, gold medalist(s)	United Kingdom	Seren Bundy-Davies; Zoey Clark; Victoria Ohuruogu; Kirsten McAslan	0.192	3:30.07	NUR
2nd place, silver medalist(s)	Poland	Małgorzata Curyło; Martyna Dąbrowska; Adrianna Janowicz; Patrycja Wyciszkiewicz	0.172	3:30.24	
3rd place, bronze medalist(s)	Russia	Yana Glotova; Yuliya Spiridonova; Tatyana Zotova; Yekaterina Renzhina	0.199	3:30.78	
4	Germany	Laura Müller; Luisa Valeske; Anna-Sophie Bellerich; Christina Hering	0.147	3:32.01	
5	Ukraine	Viktoriya Tkachuk; Anastasiya Tkachuk; Olena Kolesnychenko; Kateryna Klymyuk	0.203	3:32.86	
6	Italy	Ylenia Vitale; Joyce Mattagliano; Giulia Teruzzi; Valentina Cavalleri	0.206	3:43.87	
	Austria	Alexandra Toth; Verena Preiner; Ivona Dadic; Carina Schrempf	0.182	DQ	
	France	Déborah Sananes; Brigitte Ntiamoah; Laura Chantrayne; Aurélie Chaboudez	0.239	DQ	

== Participation ==
According to an unofficial count, 32 athletes from 8 countries participated in the event.

- Austria (4)
- France (4)
- Germany (4)
- Italy (4)
- Poland (4)
- Russia (4)
- Ukraine (4)
- United Kingdom (4)
