= 2015 European Athletics U23 Championships – Women's 400 metres =

The women's 400 metres event at the 2015 European Athletics U23 Championships was held in Tallinn, Estonia, at Kadriorg Stadium on 9 and 11 July.

== Medalists ==
Gold	Bianca Răzor; Romania
Silver	Yekaterina Renzhina; Russia
Bronze	Patrycja Wyciszkiewicz; Poland

== Results ==
=== Final ===
11 July

Rank	Name	Nationality	Reaction Time	Time	Notes
1st place, gold medalist(s)	Bianca Răzor	Romania	0.180	51.31	=PB
2nd place, silver medalist(s)	Yekaterina Renzhina	Russia	0.165	51.51	PB
3rd place, bronze medalist(s)	Patrycja Wyciszkiewicz	Poland	0.155	51.63	
4	Seren Bundy-Davies	United Kingdom	0.184	52.26	
5	Kirsten McAslan	United Kingdom	0.203	52.33	
6	Laura Müller	Germany	0.151	52.45	
7	Martyna Dąbrowska	Poland		52.65	
8	Cynthia Bolingo Mbongo	Belgium	0.202	52.82	

=== Heats ===
9 July

==== Heat 1 ====
Rank	Name	Nationality	Reaction Time	Time	Notes
1	Bianca Răzor	Romania	0.178	51.31	PB Q
2	Patrycja Wyciszkiewicz	Poland	0.165	51.62	SB Q
3	Yekaterina Renzhina	Russia	0.164	51.99	SB q
4	Kirsten McAslan	United Kingdom	0.198	52.13	PB q
5	Ylenia Vitale	Italy	0.197	53.20	PB
6	Justien Grillet	Belgium	0.144	53.37	
7	Katya Hristova	Bulgaria	0.238	54.82	

==== Heat 2 ====
Rank	Name	Nationality	Reaction Time	Time	Notes
1	Seren Bundy-Davies	United Kingdom	0.183	52.05	Q
2	Cynthia Bolingo Mbongo	Belgium	0.202	52.71	Q
3	Yana Glotova	Russia	0.177	52.87	
4	Cátia Azevedo	Portugal	0.142	53.49	
5	Kateryna Klymyuk	Ukraine	0.178	53.73	
6	Modesta Morauskaitė	Lithuania	0.162	55.29	SB
7	Lucia Pasquale	Italy	0.194	55.49	

==== Heat 3 ====
Rank	Name	Nationality	Reaction Time	Time	Notes
1	Laura Müller	Germany	0.143	52.39	PB Q
2	Martyna Dąbrowska	Poland	0.133	52.46	Q
3	Gunta Latiševa-Čudare	Latvia	0.196	52.60	PB
4	Déborah Sananes	France	0.195	53.08	
5	Kristina Dudek	Croatia	0.180	53.93	
6	Giulia Teruzzi	Italy	0.162	54.99	

== Participation ==
According to an unofficial count, 20 athletes from 14 countries participated in the event.

- Belgium (2)
- Bulgaria (1)
- Croatia (1)
- France (1)
- Germany (1)
- Italy (3)
- Latvia (1)
- Lithuania (1)
- Poland (2)
- Portugal (1)
- Romania (1)
- Russia (2)
- Ukraine (1)
- United Kingdom (2)
