= Athletics at the 2019 Summer Universiade – Women's 4 × 400 metres relay =

The women's 4 × 400 metres relay event at the 2019 Summer Universiade was held on 12 and 13 July at the Stadio San Paolo in Naples.

== Medalists ==
Gold	Silver	Bronze
Ukraine; Mariia Mykolenko; Anastasiia Holienieva; Kateryna Klymiuk; Tetiana Melnyk	Mexico; Frida Corona; Dania Aguillón; Rosa Cook; Paola Morán	Australia; Genevieve Cowie; Morgan Mitchell; Jessie Stafford; Gabriella O'Grady

== Results ==
=== Heats ===
Qualification: First 3 teams in each heat (Q) and the next 2 fastest (q) qualified for the final.

Rank	Heat	Nation	Athletes	Time	Notes
1	1	Canada	Zoe Sherar, Jenna Westaway, Maïté Bouchard, Maddy Price	3:33.24	Q
2	2	Ukraine	Mariia Mykolenko, Kateryna Klymiuk, Anastasiia Holienieva, Tetiana Melnyk	3:34.02	Q
3	2	Mexico	Frida Corona, Dania Aguillón, Rosa Cook, Paola Morán	3:34.22	Q
4	2	Australia	Genevieve Cowie, Morgan Mitchell, Jessie Stafford, Gabriella O'Grady	3:34.51	Q
5	1	Germany	Djamila Böhm, Christina Hering, Katharina Trost, Jessica-Bianca Wessolly	3:34.67	Q
6	2	Poland	Anna Pałys, Mariola Karaś, Alicja Wrona, Anna Dobek	3:34.83	q
7	1	United States	MacKenzie Kerr, Tanner Ealum, Rachel Pocratsky, Brittany Aveni	3:36.12	Q
8	2	South Africa	Taylon Bieldt, Rogail Joseph, Niene Muller, Zeney van der Walt	3:36.37	q
9	2	Turkey	Zeynep Bas, Derya Yıldırım, Berfe Sancak, Mizgin Ay	3:37.94	
10	1	Japan	Hirosawa Mae, Yanagiya Tomomi, Kanako Yuasa, Ayano Shiomi	3:39.67	
11	1	New Zealand	Georgia Hulls, Mackenzie Keenan, Anna Percy, Briana Stephenson	3:40.00	
12	1	Slovenia	Gala Trajkovič, Mojca Centrih, Ajda Lenardič, Lana Skok	3:58.07	
	1	Ghana	Salomey Agyei, Latifa Ali, Kate Agyemang, Rafiatu Nuhu	DQ	R170.19
	1	Senegal		DNS	
	2	Chile		DNS	
	2	Czech Republic		DNS	

=== Final ===
Rank	Nation	Athletes	Time	Notes
1st place, gold medalist(s)	Ukraine	Mariia Mykolenko, Anastasiia Holienieva, Kateryna Klymiuk, Tetiana Melnyk	3:30.82	
2nd place, silver medalist(s)	Mexico	Frida Corona, Dania Aguillón, Rosa Cook, Paola Morán	3:32.63	
3rd place, bronze medalist(s)	Australia	Genevieve Cowie, Morgan Mitchell, Jessie Stafford, Gabriella O'Grady	3:34.01	
4	Poland	Mariola Karaś, Alicja Wrona, Anna Pałys, Anna Dobek	3:34.04	
5	Canada	Zoe Sherar, Jenna Westaway, Lucia Stafford, Maïté Bouchard	3:34.62	
6	Germany	Djamila Böhm, Jessica-Bianca Wessolly, Katharina Trost, Christine Salterberg	3:34.66	
7	South Africa	Rogail Joseph, Taylon Bieldt, Tamzin Thomas, Zeney van der Walt	3:35.97	
	United States		DNS	
