= Athletics at the 2019 Summer Universiade – Women's 400 metres =

Women's 400 metres event

The women's 400 metres event at the 2019 Summer Universiade was held on 8, 9 and 10 July at the Stadio San Paolo in Naples.

== Medalists ==
Gold	Silver	Bronze
Paola Morán; Mexico	Leni Shida; Uganda	Amandine Brossier; France

== Results ==
=== Heats ===
Qualification: First 4 in each heat (Q) and next 4 fastest (q) qualified for the semifinals.

Rank	Heat	Name	Nationality	Time	Notes
1	2	Leni Shida	Uganda	52.24	Q
2	5	Paola Morán	Mexico	52.82	Q
3	3	Maddy Price	Canada	52.90	Q
4	1	Cátia Azevedo	Portugal	53.05	Q
5	5	Gabriella O'Grady	Australia	53.07	Q
6	3	Amandine Brossier	France	53.12	Q
7	5	Kateryna Klymiuk	Ukraine	53.14	Q, PB
8	4	Tetiana Melnyk	Ukraine	53.17	Q
9	1	Evelin Nádházy	Hungary	53.30	Q, SB
10	4	Zoe Sherar	Canada	53.38	Q
11	5	Laura de Witte	Netherlands	53.77	Q
12	1	Elina Mikhina	Kazakhstan	53.89	Q
13	4	Virginia Troiani	Italy	54.03	Q
14	3	Noelia Martínez	Argentina	54.05	Q
15	3	Anna Dobek	Poland	54.12	Q
16	5	Kristina Dudek	Croatia	54.43	q
17	3	Eva Hovenkamp	Netherlands	54.55	q, SB
18	1	Mariola Karaś	Poland	54.61	Q
19	2	Rosa Cook	Mexico	54.68	Q
20	2	Cliodhna Manning	Ireland	54.76	Q
21	1	Erika Krūminaitė	Lithuania	54.93	q, PB
22	4	Sara Dorthea Jensen	Norway	55.05	Q
23	2	Derya Yıldırım	Turkey	55.10	Q
24	3	Nafy Mane	Senegal	55.17	q
25	4	Rafiatu Nuhu	Ghana	55.37	
26	3	Berfe Sancak	Turkey	55.40	SB
27	2	MacKenzie Kerr	United States	55.49	
28	1	Salomey Agyei	Ghana	55.94	
29	5	Christin Bjelland Jensen	Norway	56.38	
30	5	Djamila Zine	Algeria	56.43	
31	4	Omaya Muthumala	Sri Lanka	56.73	PB
32	2	Poulette Cardoch	Chile	57.59	
33	3	Ajda Lenardič	Slovenia	57.79	
34	1	Rita Hajdini	Kosovo	1:01.00	
35	4	Bertha Maseka	Zambia	1:01.81	
	1	Mariama Barry	Guinea	DNS	
	2	Dahabo Zubeyr	Somalia	DNS	
	2	Ambre Astrid Yelou	Ivory Coast	DNS	
	4	Imane Ennakhli	Morocco	DNS	

=== Semifinals ===
Qualification: First 2 in each heat (Q) and next 2 fastest (q) qualified for the final.

Rank	Heat	Name	Nationality	Time	Notes
1	2	Leni Shida	Uganda	51.59	Q, SB
2	1	Cátia Azevedo	Portugal	51.62	Q, NR
3	3	Paola Morán	Mexico	51.77	Q
4	2	Gabriella O'Grady	Australia	51.87	Q, PB
5	3	Tetiana Melnyk	Ukraine	51.95	Q
6	2	Kateryna Klymiuk	Ukraine	51.97	q
7	2	Amandine Brossier	France	52.17	q
8	1	Maddy Price	Canada	52.23	Q
9	3	Elina Mikhina	Kazakhstan	52.41	SB
10	3	Zoe Sherar	Canada	52.49	
11	1	Evelin Nádházy	Hungary	52.68	PB
12	3	Noelia Martínez	Argentina	53.55	
13	3	Anna Dobek	Poland	53.70	PB
14	2	Mariola Karaś	Poland	54.25	
15	3	Eva Hovenkamp	Netherlands	54.27	SB
16	1	Laura de Witte	Netherlands	54.45	
17	1	Kristina Dudek	Croatia	54.56	
18	1	Rosa Cook	Mexico	54.66	
19	2	Sara Dorthea Jensen	Norway	54.77	
20	3	Derya Yıldırım	Turkey	54.85	
21	1	Erika Krūminaitė	Lithuania	55.01	PB
22	2	Nafy Mane	Senegal	55.24	
	2	Virginia Troiani	Italy	DQ	R163.3a
	1	Cliodhna Manning	Ireland	DNS	

=== Final ===
Official Video

Rank	Lane	Name	Nationality	Time	Notes
1st place, gold medalist(s)	5	Paola Morán	Mexico	51.52	
2nd place, silver medalist(s)	6	Leni Shida	Uganda	51.64	
3rd place, bronze medalist(s)	1	Amandine Brossier	France	51.77	PB
4	8	Tetiana Melnyk	Ukraine	52.02	
5	4	Cátia Azevedo	Portugal	52.07	
6	7	Maddy Price	Canada	52.08	
7	3	Gabriella O'Grady	Australia	52.27	
8	2	Kateryna Klymiuk	Ukraine	52.52	
