= Athletics at the 2017 Summer Universiade – Women's 4 × 400 metres relay =

The women's 4 × 400 metres relay event at the 2017 Summer Universiade was held on 27 and 28 August at the Taipei Municipal Stadium.

== Medalists ==
Gold	Silver	Bronze
Poland (POL); Małgorzata Hołub; Iga Baumgart; Patrycja Wyciszkiewicz; Justyna Święty; Aleksandra Gaworska*; Martyna Dąbrowska*	Mexico (MEX); Dania Aguillón; Natali Brito; Leticia Cook; Paola Morán	Romania (ROM); Anamaria Nesteriuc; Sanda Belgyan; Camelia Florina Gal; Bianca Răzor

*Athletes who competed in heats only

== Results ==
=== Heats ===
Qualification: First 3 teams in each heat (Q) and the next 2 fastest (q) qualified for the final.

Rank	Heat	Nation	Athletes	Time	Notes
1	2	Ukraine	Olena Kolesnychenko, Anastasiia Bryzgina, Olha Bibik, Tetiana Melnyk	3:31.76	Q
2	2	Poland	Aleksandra Gaworska, Martyna Dąbrowska, Patrycja Wyciszkiewicz, Justyna Święty	3:32.62	Q
3	2	Canada	Kelsey Balkwill, Jenna Westaway, Aiyanna Stiverne, Micha Powell	3:34.80	Q, SB
4	1	Mexico	Dania Aguillón, Natali Brito, Leticia Cook, Paola Morán	3:38.16	Q, SB
5	1	Romania	Camelia Florina Gal, Sanda Belgyan, Anamaria Nesteriuc, Bianca Răzor	3:38.78	Q
6	2	Australia	Gabriella O'Grady, Alexandra Bartholomew, Jessie Stafford, Alicia Keir	3:39.67	q
7	1	Uganda	Leni Shida, Docus Ajok, Agnes Amuron, Scovia Ayikoru	3:45.73	Q
8	1	Thailand	Pornpan Hoemhuk, Atchima Eng-Chuan, Thanphimon Kaeodi, Supanich Poolkerd	3:50.55	q
9	1	Slovenia	Tamara Zupanič, Aneja Kodrič, Eva Kavka, Anja Plaznik	3:55.54	

=== Final ===
Rank	Nation	Athletes	Time	Notes
1st place, gold medalist(s)	Poland	Małgorzata Hołub, Iga Baumgart, Patrycja Wyciszkiewicz, Justyna Święty	3:26.75	
2nd place, silver medalist(s)	Mexico	Dania Aguillón, Natali Brito, Leticia Cook, Paola Morán	3:33.98	SB
3rd place, bronze medalist(s)	Romania	Anamaria Nesteriuc, Sanda Belgyan, Camelia Florina Gal, Bianca Răzor	3:34.16	
4	Canada	Kelsey Balkwill, Jenna Westaway, Aiyanna Stiverne, Micha Powell	3:36.44	
5	Australia	Gabriella O'Grady, Jessie Stafford, Alexandra Bartholomew, Alicia Keir	3:41.08	
6	Uganda	Scovia Ayikoru, Leni Shida, Agnes Amuron, Docus Ajok	3:43.38	
7	Thailand	Pornpan Hoemhuk, Atchima Eng-Chuan, Thanphimon Kaeodi, Supanich Poolkerd	3:43.53	
	Ukraine	Kateryna Klymiuk, Olha Bibik, Anastasiia Bryzgina, Tetiana Melnyk	DQ	R170.11
