= 2018 IAAF World Indoor Championships – Women's 4 × 400 metres relay =

Women's 4 × 400 metres relay at the 2018 IAAF World Indoor Championships
- Venue: Arena Birmingham
- Dates: 3–4 March
- Competitors: 40 from 10 nations
- Winning time: 3:23.85 CR

Medalists
gold medal	Quanera Hayes; Georganne Moline; Shakima Wimbley; Courtney Okolo; Joanna Atkins*; Raevyn Rogers*	United States
silver medal	Justyna Święty-Ersetic; Patrycja Wyciszkiewicz; Aleksandra Gaworska; Małgorzata Hołub-Kowalik; Joanna Linkiewicz*; Natalia Kaczmarek*	Poland
bronze medal	Meghan Beesley; Hannah Williams; Amy Allcock; Zoey Clark; Anyika Onuora*	Great Britain

Video on YouTube Official Video

The women's 4 × 400 metres relay at the 2018 IAAF World Indoor Championships took place on 3 and 4 March 2018.

== Summary ==
USA, in lane 5 was led off by Quanera Hayes, opening up a slight lead from the gun, but going in to the second turn, Ukraine's Tetyana Melnyk accelerated and hit the break line ahead. Hayes was unable to get ahead of Melnyk, held to the outside of their penultimate turn. Down the backstretch, Hayes was able to ease into the lead, with Jamaica's Tovea Jenkins on her heels. Through the final turn Hayes and Jenkins put a gap on the next pursuer as Melnyk tied up and Poland's Justyna Święty-Ersetic had to make her way around the obstacle. Hayes's split 51.56. With Jamaica now in second place, Janieve Russell squeezed inside of Ukraine's #2 runner Kateryna Klymiuk to take the handoff just behind USA's Georganne Moline, who, with help from the momentary chaos, opened up an additional 2 metres on Russell. Poland's Patrycja Wyciszkiewicz latched on to Russell as Moline expanded the gap to 5 metres after the first lap. There was more than 15 metres further gap back to the British team represented by Hannah Williams. On her second lap, Moline struggled, at one point losing her balance on the steeply banked turn. Russell pulled in the gap, the two teams passing virtually at the same time, with Wyciszkiewicz just a metre back, the split 50.87. USA's Shakima Wimbley got to the turn first and held a 1 metre lead over Jamaica's Anastasia Le-Roy. Two metres back Aleksandra Gaworska kept Poland in the mix. Through her first lap, Wimbley opened up an additional metre on Le-Roy as the two separated from Gaworska. Wimbley's split 51.27. On the anchor, USA had the world champion Courtney Okolo, while Jamaica had their star Stephenie Ann McPherson untested from these championships, a victim of the lane violation disqualification epidemic. McPherson stayed locked to Okolo, more than a metre behind, with Poland's Małgorzata Hołub-Kowalik another 7 metres back. Down the first backstretch, Okolo stretched the lead, but in the second turn McPherson reeled her back in. The second time down the backstretch Okolo extended the lead again and coming off the final turn McPherson took another run at her, closing the gap slightly but unable to make enough progress. USA crossed the line first, Jamaica second, Poland third and distantly, GBR, Ukraine and Italy.

After the race, there was a flurry of disqualifications and appeals. After the dust settled, Jamaica was disqualified for Russell's maneuver at the handoff, advancing Poland to silver and the home team to bronze. Initially, Great Britain were disqualified for obstruction after a protest from the Ukrainian team. As a result, the originally fifth-placed Ukraine team was briefly boosted to bronze, but then an appeal by the British team against the disqualification was successful and the result reinstated.

== Results ==
=== Heats ===
The heats were started on 3 March at 13:20.

Rank	Heat	Lane	Nation	Athletes	Time	Notes
1	1	5	United States	Quanera Hayes, Joanna Atkins, Georganne Moline, Raevyn Rogers	3:30.54	Q
2	2	3	Jamaica	Janieve Russell, Dominique Blake, Tiffany James, Anastasia Le-Roy	3:32.01	Q, SB
3	2	5	Ukraine	Tetyana Melnyk, Kateryna Klymiuk, Anna Yaroshchuk-Ryzhykova, Anastasiya Bryzhina	3:32.06	Q, SB
4	2	4	Poland	Małgorzata Hołub-Kowalik, Joanna Linkiewicz, Natalia Kaczmarek, Aleksandra Gaworska	3:32.07	q, SB
5	1	4	Great Britain	Amy Allcock, Anyika Onuora, Hannah Williams, Meghan Beesley	3:32.57	Q, SB
6	1	6	Italy	Raphaela Boaheng Lukudo, Ayomide Folorunso, Chiara Bazzoni, Maria Enrica Spacca	3:32.62	q, SB
7	2	2	Czech Republic	Martina Hofmanová, Marcela Pírková, Tereza Petržilková, Lada Vondrová	3:34.90	SB
8	2	6	Portugal	Filipa Martins, Cátia Azevedo, Rivinilda Mentai, Dorothé Évora	3:35.43	NR
9	1	3	Kazakhstan	Svetlana Golendova, Elina Mikhina, Lyubov Ushakova, Adelina Akhmetova	3:40.54	SB
	1	2	Nigeria		DNS	

=== Final ===
The final was started on 4 March at 16:30.

Rank	Lane	Nation	Athletes	Time	Notes
1st place, gold medalist(s)	5	United States	Quanera Hayes, Georganne Moline, Shakima Wimbley, Courtney Okolo	3:23.85	CR, AIR
2nd place, silver medalist(s)	1	Poland	Justyna Święty-Ersetic, Patrycja Wyciszkiewicz, Aleksandra Gaworska, Małgorzata Hołub-Kowalik	3:26.09	NIR
3rd place, bronze medalist(s)	3	Great Britain	Meghan Beesley, Hannah Williams, Amy Allcock, Zoey Clark	3:29.38	SB
4	4	Ukraine	Tetyana Melnyk, Kateryna Klymiuk, Anna Yaroshchuk-Ryzhykova, Anastasiya Bryzhina	3:31.32	SB
5	2	Italy	Raphaela Boaheng Lukudo, Ayomide Folorunso, Chiara Bazzoni, Maria Enrica Spacca	3:31.55	NIR
	6	Jamaica	Tovea Jenkins, Janieve Russell, Anastasia Le-Roy, Stephenie Ann McPherson	DQ	218.4
