= 2011 World Youth Championships in Athletics – Girls' 400 metres =

Girls' 400 metres at the 2011 World Youth Championships in Athletics
- Venue: Stadium Lille Métropole
- Dates: 6 July (heats); 7 July (semifinal); 8 July (final)
- Competitors: 47
- Winning time: 51.84 PB

Medalists
gold medal	Shaunae Miller	Bahamas
silver medal	Christian Brennan	Canada
bronze medal	Olivia James	Jamaica

The girls' 400 metres at the 2011 World Youth Championships in Athletics was held at the Stadium Lille Métropole on 6, 7 and 8 July.

== Medalists ==
Gold	Silver	Bronze
Shaunae Miller; Bahamas	Christian Brennan; Canada	Olivia James; Jamaica

== Records ==
Prior to the competition, the following records were as follows.

World Youth Best	Li Jing (CHN)	50.01	Shanghai, China	18 October 1997
Championship Record	Nawal El Jack (SUD)	51.19	Marrakesh, Morocco	15 July 2005
World Youth Leading	Chrisann Gordon (JAM)	51.62	Kingston, Jamaica	2 April 2011

No new records were set during the competition.

== Heats ==
Qualification rule: first 3 of each heat (Q) plus the 6 fastest times (q) qualified.

=== Heat 1 ===
Rank	Name	Nationality	Time	Notes
1	Bianca Răzor	Romania	54.15	Q
2	Ella Räsänen	Finland	54.43	Q
3	Bárbara Camblor	Spain	55.64	Q
4	Dorotea Rebernik	Slovenia	55.95	q, PB
5	Raphaela Boaheng Lukudo	Italy	56.19	q
6	Ines Futterknecht	Austria	56.49	
7	Ingrid Yahoska Narvaez	Nicaragua	58.74	PB
8	Tahlie Cablayan	Philippines	59.58	

=== Heat 2 ===
Rank	Name	Nationality	Time	Notes
1	Shaunae Miller	Bahamas	54.39	Q
2	Brigitte Ntiamoah	France	57.06	Q
3	Anna Parfenova	Russia	57.07	Q
4	Stephanie Wicksell	South Africa	57.19	
5	Selam Abrhaley	Ethiopia	57.52	PB
6	Elvira Vázquez	Spain	57.98	
7	Bojana Kalicanin	Serbia	58.97	
8	Park Seong-myun	South Korea	59.28	

=== Heat 3 ===
Rank	Name	Nationality	Time	Notes
1	Chrisann Gordon	Jamaica	53.52	Q
2	Patrycja Wyciszkiewicz	Poland	53.71	Q, PB
3	Modesta Morauskaitė	Lithuania	55.81	Q, PB
4	Kristina Dudek	Croatia	55.89	q, PB
5	Anastasiya Aslanidi	Russia	56.38	
6	Lourdes Dallazem	Brazil	57.21	
7	Tiguida Diarouma	France	58.14	

=== Heat 4 ===
Rank	Name	Nationality	Time	Notes
1	Robin Reynolds	United States	54.59	Q
2	Florence Uwakwe	Nigeria	54.72	Q
3	Blanka Kuta	Poland	56.86	Q
4	Ayaka Nagura	Japan	57.01	
5	Frédérique Hansen	Luxembourg	57.13	SB
6	Christine Botlogetswe	Botswana	59.13	
7	Naomi Blaz	Guam	1:03.18	
–	Glenda Davis	Costa Rica	DNF	

=== Heat 5 ===
Rank	Name	Nationality	Time	Notes
1	Olivia James	Jamaica	54.78	Q
2	Kendall Baisden	United States	55.58	Q
3	Anja Benko	Slovenia	55.97	Q
4	Bianka Kéri	Hungary	56.26	q
5	Oksana Ralko	Ukraine	56.41	
6	Mareike Wolhüter	South Africa	58.92	
7	Elina Mikhina	Kazakhstan	1:00.44	SB
8	Loth Toni	Benin	1:01.37	

=== Heat 6 ===
Rank	Name	Nationality	Time	Notes
1	Christian Brennan	Canada	53.83	Q
2	Rita Ossai	Nigeria	55.11	Q
3	Ylenia Vitale	Italy	55.63	Q, PB
4	Kateryna Klymyuk	Ukraine	55.91	q
5	Priyanka Mondal	India	56.27	q, PB
6	Neviah Mongina Michira	Kenya	57.46	PB
7	Lorayna Lima	Brazil	57.55	
8	Asli Arik	Turkey	57.64	

== Semifinal ==
Qualification rule: first 2 of each heat (Q) plus the 2 fastest times (q) qualified.

=== Heat 1 ===
Rank	Lane	Name	Nationality	Time	Notes
1	5	Chrisann Gordon	Jamaica	52.79	Q
2	6	Robin Reynolds	United States	53.21	Q
3	3	Patrycja Wyciszkiewicz	Poland	53.97	
4	8	Ylenia Vitale	Italy	55.29	PB
5	7	Anna Parfenova	Russia	55.40	
6	2	Kristina Dudek	Croatia	56.49	
7	1	Priyanka Mondal	India	57.16	
8	4	Brigitte Ntiamoah	France	57.38	

=== Heat 2 ===
Rank	Lane	Name	Nationality	Time	Notes
1	5	Shaunae Miller	Bahamas	52.92	Q
2	6	Kendall Baisden	United States	53.32	Q
3	4	Bianca Răzor	Romania	53.51	q
4	3	Florence Uwakwe	Nigeria	54.11	
5	8	Modesta Morauskaité	Lithuania	55.55	PB
6	7	Anja Benko	Slovenia	55.89	
7	1	Raphaela Boaheng Lukudo	Italy	56.46	
8	2	Bianka Kéri	Hungary	56.97	

=== Heat 3 ===
Rank	Lane	Name	Nationality	Time	Notes
1	3	Christian Brennan	Canada	53.15	Q
2	4	Olivia James	Jamaica	53.51	Q
3	5	Ella Räsänen	Finland	53.92	q
4	6	Rita Ossai	Nigeria	54.02	
5	1	Kateryna Klymyuk	Ukraine	56.15	
6	8	Bárbara Camblor	Spain	56.25	
7	2	Dorotea Rebernik	Slovenia	57.05	
8	7	Blanka Kuta	Poland	58.35	

== Final ==
Rank	Lane	Name	Nationality	Time	Notes
1st place, gold medalist(s)	6	Shaunae Miller	Bahamas	51.84	
2nd place, silver medalist(s)	5	Christian Brennan	Canada	52.12	
3rd place, bronze medalist(s)	7	Olivia James	Jamaica	52.14	
4	3	Robin Reynolds	United States	52.72	
5	1	Bianca Răzor	Romania	52.82	
6	8	Kendall Baisden	United States	53.01	
7	4	Chrisann Gordon	Jamaica	53.31	
8	2	Ella Räsänen	Finland	54.55	
