= 2019 European Athletics Indoor Championships – Women's 4 × 400 metres relay =

The women's 4 × 400 metres relay event at the 2019 European Athletics Indoor Championships was held on 3 March 2019 at 20:40 (final) local time.

== Records ==
World record	Russia (RUS)	3:23.37	Glasgow, United Kingdom	28 January 2006
European record	Russia (RUS)	3:23.37	Glasgow, United Kingdom	28 January 2006
Championship record	Great Britain (GBR)	3:27.56	Gothenburg, Sweden	3 March 2013
World Leading	Texas A&M University	3:29.15	Fayetteville, United States	23 February 2019
European Leading	Ukraine (UKR)	3:33.76	Istanbul, Turkey	16 February 2019

== Results ==
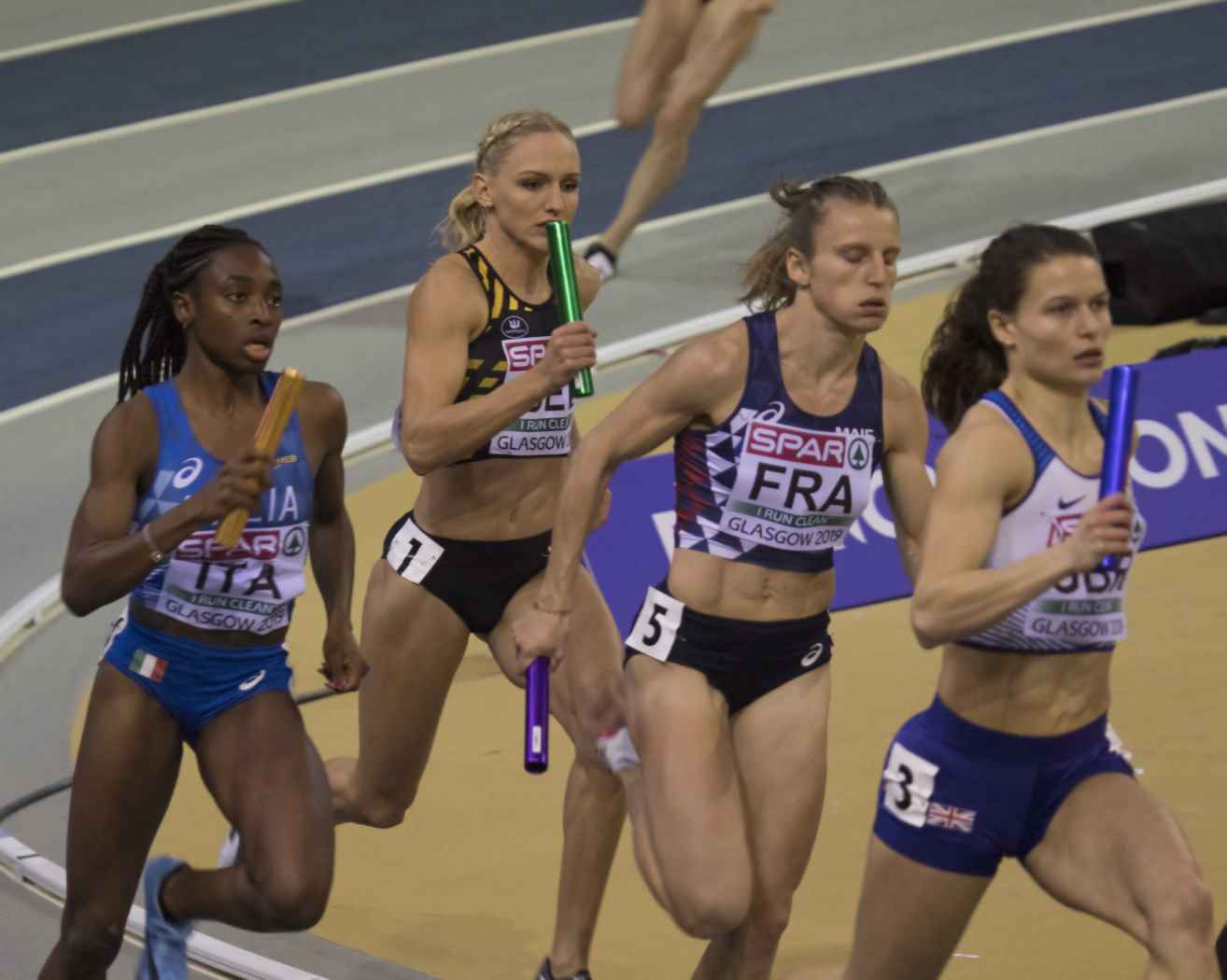
2nd leg

Rank	Nationality	Athlete	Time	Notes
1st place, gold medalist(s)	Poland	Anna Kiełbasińska; Iga Baumgart-Witan; Małgorzata Hołub-Kowalik; Justyna Święty-Ersetic	3:28.77	WL
2nd place, silver medalist(s)	Great Britain	Laviai Nielsen; Zoey Clark; Amber Anning; Eilidh Doyle	3:29.55	
3rd place, bronze medalist(s)	Italy	Raphaela Boaheng Lukudo; Ayomide Folorunso; Chiara Bazzoni; Marta Milani	3:31.90	
4	France	Déborah Sananes; Amandine Brossier; Kalyl Amaro; Agnès Raharolahy	3:32.12	
5	Belgium	Cynthia Bolingo Mbongo; Hanne Claes; Margo Van Puyvelde; Camille Laus	3:32.46	NR
6	Switzerland	Cornelia Halbheer; Léa Sprunger; Fanette Humair; Yasmin Giger	3:33.72	NR
