= Athletics at the 2017 Summer Universiade – Women's 400 metres hurdles =

The women's 400 metres hurdles event at the 2017 Summer Universiade was held on 24 and 25 August at the Taipei Municipal Stadium.

== Medalists ==
Gold	Silver	Bronze
Ayomide Folorunso; Italy (ITA)	Joanna Linkiewicz; Poland (POL)	Olena Kolesnychenko; Ukraine (UKR)

== Results ==
=== Heats ===
Qualification: The winner of each heat (Q) and next 4 fastest (q) qualified for the final.

Rank	Heat	Name	Nationality	Time	Notes
1	4	Olena Kolesnychenko	Ukraine	57.14	Q
2	1	Aleksandra Gaworska	Poland	57.53	Q
3	1	Jessica Turner	Great Britain	57.73	q
4	2	Joanna Linkiewicz	Poland	57.74	Q
5	4	Margo Van Puyvelde	Belgium	57.81	q
6	3	Ayomide Folorunso	Italy	58.07	Q
7	2	Daniela Rojas	Costa Rica	58.40	q, PB
8	1	Jonna Berghem	Finland	58.74	q
9	2	Kelsey Balkwill	Canada	58.75	
10	2	Elif Gören	Turkey	59.11	
11	4	Sanda Belgyan	Romania	59.50	SB
12	4	Andreia Oliveira	Portugal	59.67	
13	2	Daniela Ledecká	Slovakia	59.69	
14	3	Deonca Bookman	United States	59.84	
14	4	Elpida Toka	Greece	59.84	
16	3	Marlen Aakre	Norway	1:00.44	
17	1	Emily Norum	Norway	1:00.74	
18	1	Lin Yu-chieh	Chinese Taipei	1:01.63	
19	4	Diāna Daktere	Latvia	1:01.97	
20	3	Gladys Ngure	Kenya	1:04.87	
21	3	Annemarie Nissen	Denmark	1:05.39	
22	2	Harshani Godagedara Vidanalage	Sri Lanka	1:10.68	
	3	Dihia Haddar	Algeria	DNF	
	1	Vishwa Priya Ramamurthi Venugopa	India	DQ	R168.7a

=== Final ===
Official Video

Rank	Lane	Name	Nationality	Time	Notes
1st place, gold medalist(s)	4	Ayomide Folorunso	Italy	55.63	
2nd place, silver medalist(s)	3	Joanna Linkiewicz	Poland	55.90	
3rd place, bronze medalist(s)	5	Olena Kolesnychenko	Ukraine	56.14	SB
4	6	Aleksandra Gaworska	Poland	57.25	
5	7	Jessica Turner	Great Britain	57.45	
6	2	Jonna Berghem	Finland	57.90	PB
7	8	Margo Van Puyvelde	Belgium	58.47	
8	1	Daniela Rojas	Costa Rica	58.78	
