= 2017 European Athletics U23 Championships – Women's 400 metres hurdles =

The women's 400 metres hurdles event at the 2017 European Athletics U23 Championships was held in Bydgoszcz, Poland, at Zdzisław Krzyszkowiak Stadium on 14, 15 and 16 July.

== Medalists ==
Gold	Ayomide Folorunso; Italy
Silver	Jessica Turner; Great Britain
Bronze	Arna Stefanía Guðmundsdóttir; Iceland

== Results ==
=== Heats ===
14 July

Qualification rule: First 3 (Q) and the next 4 fastest (q) qualified for the semifinals.

Rank	Heat	Name	Nationality	Time	Notes
1	4	Jackie Baumann	Germany	56.96	Q
2	1	Margo Van Puyvelde	Belgium	57.27	Q
3	1	Arna Stefanía Guðmundsdóttir	Iceland	57.45	Q
4	3	Ayomide Folorunso	Italy	57.48	Q
5	4	Nenah De Coninck	Belgium	57.78	Q
6	4	Johanna Holmén Svensson	Sweden	57.86	Q, PB
7	2	Rebecca Sartori	Italy	58.12	Q
8	3	Aleksandra Gaworska	Poland	58.20	Q
9	2	Jessica Turner	Great Britain	58.54	Q
10	4	Anaïs Seiller	France	58.59	q
11	1	Valentina Cavalleri	Italy	58.73	Q
12	3	Julie Hounsinou	France	58.78	Q
13	2	Anna Sjoukje Runia	Netherlands	58.80	Q
14	3	Eveliina Määttänen	Finland	58.85	q, SB
15	3	Hanna Palmqvist	Sweden	58.98	q
16	4	Justyna Saganiak	Poland	59.66	q
17	2	Emma Koistinen	Finland	59.77	
18	1	Liis Roose	Estonia	59.99	
19	2	Julija Praprotnik	Slovenia	1:00.07	
20	4	Valentina Jurić	Croatia	1:00.09	
21	2	Emily Rose Norum	Norway	1:00.16	
22	4	Michaela Bicianová	Czech Republic	1:00.38	
23	3	Nora Kollerød Wold	Norway	1:00.46	
24	3	Jelena Grujić	Serbia	1:00.86	
25	1	Drita Islami	Macedonia	1:01.22	
26	1	Sonia Nasarre	Spain	1:01.37	
26	2	Büşra Yıldırım	Turkey	1:02.06	
27	2	Ida Šimunčić	Croatia	1:02.46	
	3	Daniela Ledecká	Slovakia	DQ	R162.7
	1	Hanneke Oosterwegel	Netherlands	DNS	

=== Semifinals ===
15 July

Qualification rule: First 3 (Q) and the next 2 fastest (q) qualified for the final.

Rank	Heat	Name	Nationality	Time	Notes
1	1	Ayomide Folorunso	Italy	56.35	Q, SB
2	2	Jackie Baumann	Germany	56.92	Q
3	2	Nenah De Coninck	Belgium	56.99	Q, SB
4	1	Arna Stefanía Guðmundsdóttir	Iceland	57.02	Q
5	2	Jessica Turner	Great Britain	57.32	Q
6	1	Margo Van Puyvelde	Belgium	57.34	Q
7	1	Aleksandra Gaworska	Poland	57.35	q
8	1	Anna Sjoukje Runia	Netherlands	57.44	q
9	2	Rebecca Sartori	Italy	57.64	PB
10	2	Valentina Cavalleri	Italy	57.68	PB
11	1	Eveliina Määttänen	Finland	58.07	PB
12	2	Johanna Holmén Svensson	Sweden	58.14	
13	2	Anaïs Seiller	France	58.22	
14	2	Justyna Saganiak	Poland	58.50	
15	1	Hanna Palmqvist	Sweden	58.75	
16	1	Julie Hounsinou	France	58.78	

=== Final ===
16 July

Rank	Lane	Name	Nationality	Time	Notes
1st place, gold medalist(s)	5	Ayomide Folorunso	Italy	55.82	SB
2nd place, silver medalist(s)	8	Jessica Turner	Great Britain	56.08	PB
3rd place, bronze medalist(s)	4	Arna Stefanía Guðmundsdóttir	Iceland	56.37	SB
4	2	Aleksandra Gaworska	Poland	56.94	
5	7	Margo Van Puyvelde	Belgium	57.12	
6	3	Nenah De Coninck	Belgium	57.43	
7	6	Jackie Baumann	Germany	57.74	
8	1	Anna Sjoukje Runia	Netherlands	59.53	
