= 2012 World Junior Championships in Athletics – Women's 4 × 400 metres relay =

The women's 4 × 400 metres relay at the 2012 World Junior Championships in Athletics was held at the Estadi Olímpic Lluís Companys on 14 and 15 July 2012.

== Medalists ==
Gold	Silver	Bronze
United States; Erika Rucker; Olivia Ekpone; Kendall Baisden; Ashley Spencer	Jamaica; Sandrae Farquharson; Olivia James; Shericka Jackson; Janieve Russell	Russia; Yana Glotova; Alina Galitskaya; Yuliya Koltachikhina; Ekaterina Renzhina

== Records ==
Prior to the competition, the existing world junior and championship records were as follows.

World Junior Record & Championship Record	United States (Alexandria Anderson, Ashlee Kidd, Stephanie Smith, Natasha Hastings)	3:27.60	Grosseto, Italy	18 July 2004
World Junior Leading	Jamaica (Genekee Leith, Simoya Campbell, Janieve Russell, Olivia James)	3:34.27	Hamilton, Bermuda	9 April 2012
Broken records during the 2012 World Junior Championships in Athletics
World Junior Leading	United States (Erika Rucker, Olivia Ekpone, Kendall Baisden, Ashley Spencer)	3:30.01	Barcelona, Spain	15 July 2012

== Results ==
=== Heats ===
Qualification: First 3 of each heat (Q) plus the 2 fastest times (q) qualified

Rank	Heat	Lane	Nation	Athletes	Time	Notes
1	3	2	United States	Kendall Baisden, Robin Reynolds, Kiara Porter, Olivia Ekpone	3:34.25	q, WJL
2	2	6	Jamaica	Sandrae Farquharson, Olivia James, Genekee Leith, Shericka Jackson	3:34.96	Q
3	2	9	Canada	Alexandra Courtnall, Devan Wiebe, Julia Zrinyi, Sage Watson	3:35.56	Q, SB
4	2	2	Russia	Yana Glotova, Alina Galitskaya, Yuliya Koltachikhina, Ekaterina Renzhina	3:35.83	Q, SB
5	2	8	Ukraine	Oksana Ralko, Kateryna Slyusarenko, Tetiana Shevchenko, Viktoriya Tkachuk	3:35.97	q, SB
6	2	7	Germany	Maike Schachtschneider, Lea Madlen Meyer, Ann-Kathrin Kopf, Anna-Sophie Bellerich	3:37.90	q, SB
7	2	5	Colombia	Janeth Largacha, Evelis Aguilar, Rosa Escobar, Melisa Torres	3:39.44	
8	1	1	Poland	Agnieszka Karczmarczyk, Patrycja Wyciszkiewicz, Małgorzata Curyło, Martyna Dąbrowska	3:39.54	Q, SB
9	1	7	South Africa	Izelle Neuhoff, Janet Seeliger, Stephanie Wicksell, Justine Palframan	3:40.00	Q, SB
10	1	4	Australia	Abbey de la Motte, Ella Solin, Emily Coppins, Morgan Mitchell	3:40.57	Q, SB
11	2	4	Kazakhstan	Elina Mikhina, Olga Andreyeva, Yekaterina Yermak, Marina Zaiko	3:45.34	
12	2	3	Hungary	Nóra Zajovics, Fanni Dániel, Zsanett Kenesei, Bianka Kéri	3:48.72	SB
	1	2	United States	Kendall Baisden, Robin Reynolds, Kiara Porter, Olivia Ekpone	DQ	
	1	5	Romania	Maria Loredana Carasila, Adelina Pastor, Roxana Ene, Bianca Răzor	DQ	
	1	3	Austria		DNS	
	1	6	Finland		DNS	
	1	8	France		DNS	
	1	9	Nigeria		DNS	
	3	5	Romania		DNS	

=== Final ===
Rank	Lane	Nation	Athletes	Time	Notes
1st place, gold medalist(s)	9	United States	Erika Rucker, Olivia Ekpone, Kendall Baisden, Ashley Spencer	3:30.01	WJL
2nd place, silver medalist(s)	6	Jamaica	Sandrae Farquharson, Olivia James, Shericka Jackson, Janieve Russell	3:32.97	SB
3rd place, bronze medalist(s)	3	Russia	Yana Glotova, Alina Galitskaya, Yuliya Koltachikhina, Ekaterina Renzhina	3:36.42	
4	1	Ukraine	Oksana Ralko, Kateryna Slyusarenko, Viktoriya Tkachuk, Anastasiia Tkachuk	3:37.02	
5	2	Germany	Maike Schachtschneider, Lea Madlen Meyer, Anna-Sophie Bellerich, Sonja Mosler	3:37.23	SB
6	7	Canada	Alexandra Courtnall, Devan Wiebe, Julia Zrinyi, Sage Watson	3:37.84	
7	5	Poland	Agnieszka Karczmarczyk, Patrycja Wyciszkiewicz, Małgorzata Curyło, Martyna Dąbrowska	3:37.90	SB
8	8	Australia	Abbey de la Motte, Ella Solin, Tessa Consedine, Morgan Mitchell	3:38.84	SB
9	4	South Africa	Justine Palframan, Janet Seeliger, Ane Fourie, Stephanie Wicksell	3:40.31	

== Participation ==
According to an unofficial count, 59 athletes from 13 countries participated in the event.

- Australia (5)
- Canada (4)
- Colombia (4)
- Germany (5)
- Hungary (4)
- Jamaica (5)
- Kazakhstan (4)
- Poland (4)
- Romania (4)
- Russia (4)
- South Africa (5)
- Ukraine (5)
- United States (6)
