= 2017 European Athletics U23 Championships – Women's 4 × 400 metres relay =

The women's 4 × 400 metres relay event at the 2017 European Athletics U23 Championships was held in Bydgoszcz, Poland, at Zdzisław Krzyszkowiak Stadium on 16 July.

== Results ==
Rank	Nation	Athletes	Time	Notes
1st place, gold medalist(s)	Poland	Dominika Muraszewska, Adrianna Janowicz, Mariola Karaś, Aleksandra Gaworska	3:29.66	
2nd place, silver medalist(s)	Germany	Hendrikje Richter, Laura Müller, Nelly Schmidt, Hannah Mergenthaler	3:30.18	
3rd place, bronze medalist(s)	Ukraine	Dariya Stavnycha, Yana Kachur, Tetyana Melnyk, Kateryna Klymyuk	3:30.22	
4	Great Britain	Lina Nielsen, Laviai Nielsen, Jessica Turner, Cheriece Hylton	3:30.74	
5	Italy	Ylenia Vitale, Virginia Troiani, Alexandra Troiani, Ayomide Folorunso	3:33.31	
6	Ireland	Sophie Becker, Cliodhna Manning, Jenna Bromell, Síofra Cléirigh Büttner	3:34.87	
7	France	Julie Hounsinou, Corane Gazeau, Anaïs Seiller, Déborah Sananes	3:36.41	
8	Czech Republic	Helena Jiranová, Michaela Bicianová, Martina Hofmanová, Marcela Pírková	3:38.13	
9	Hungary	Evelin Nádházy, Melinda Ferenczi, Anna Sajtos, Krisztina Osváth	3:39.33	

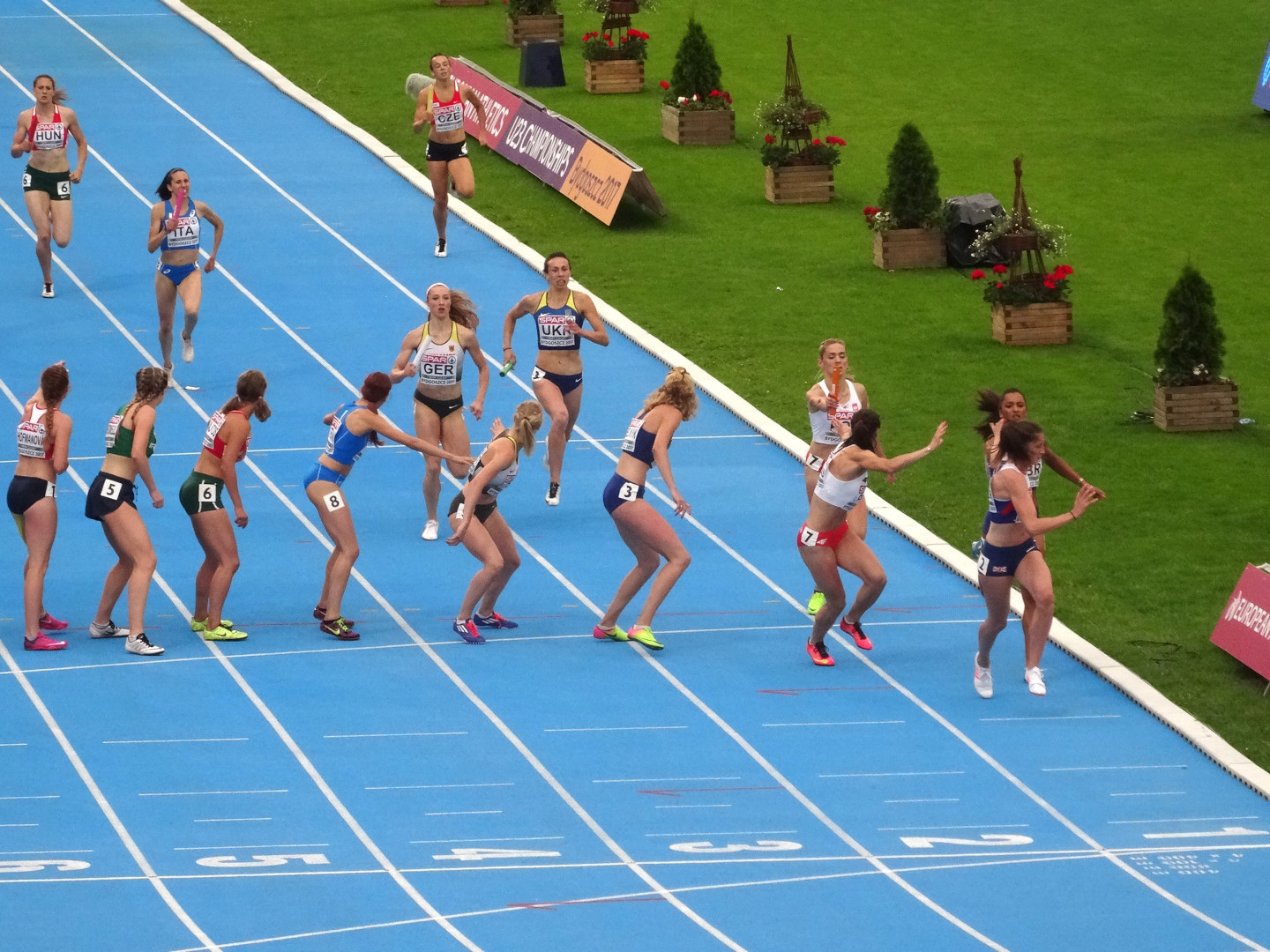
Second exchange

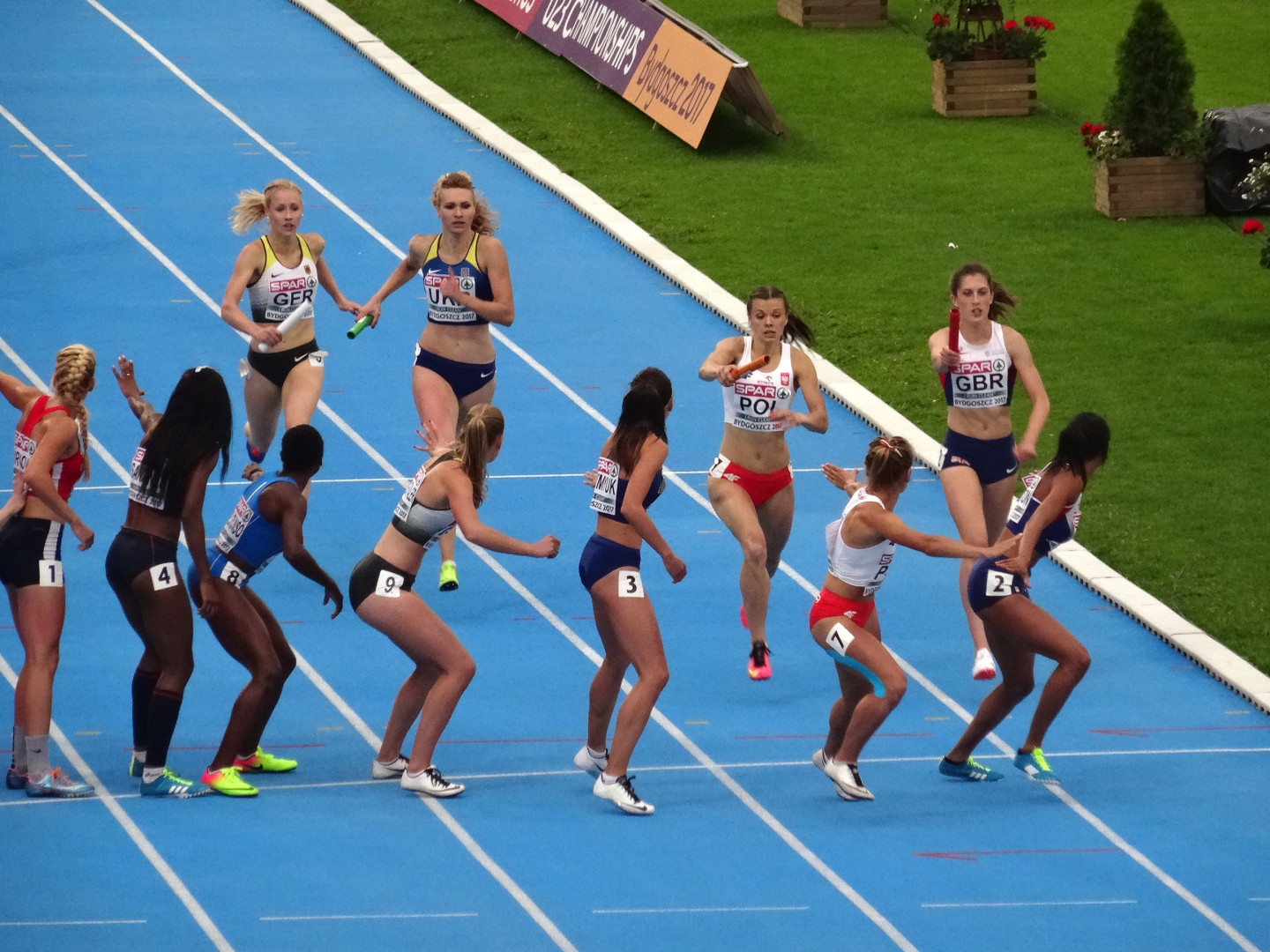
Third exchange

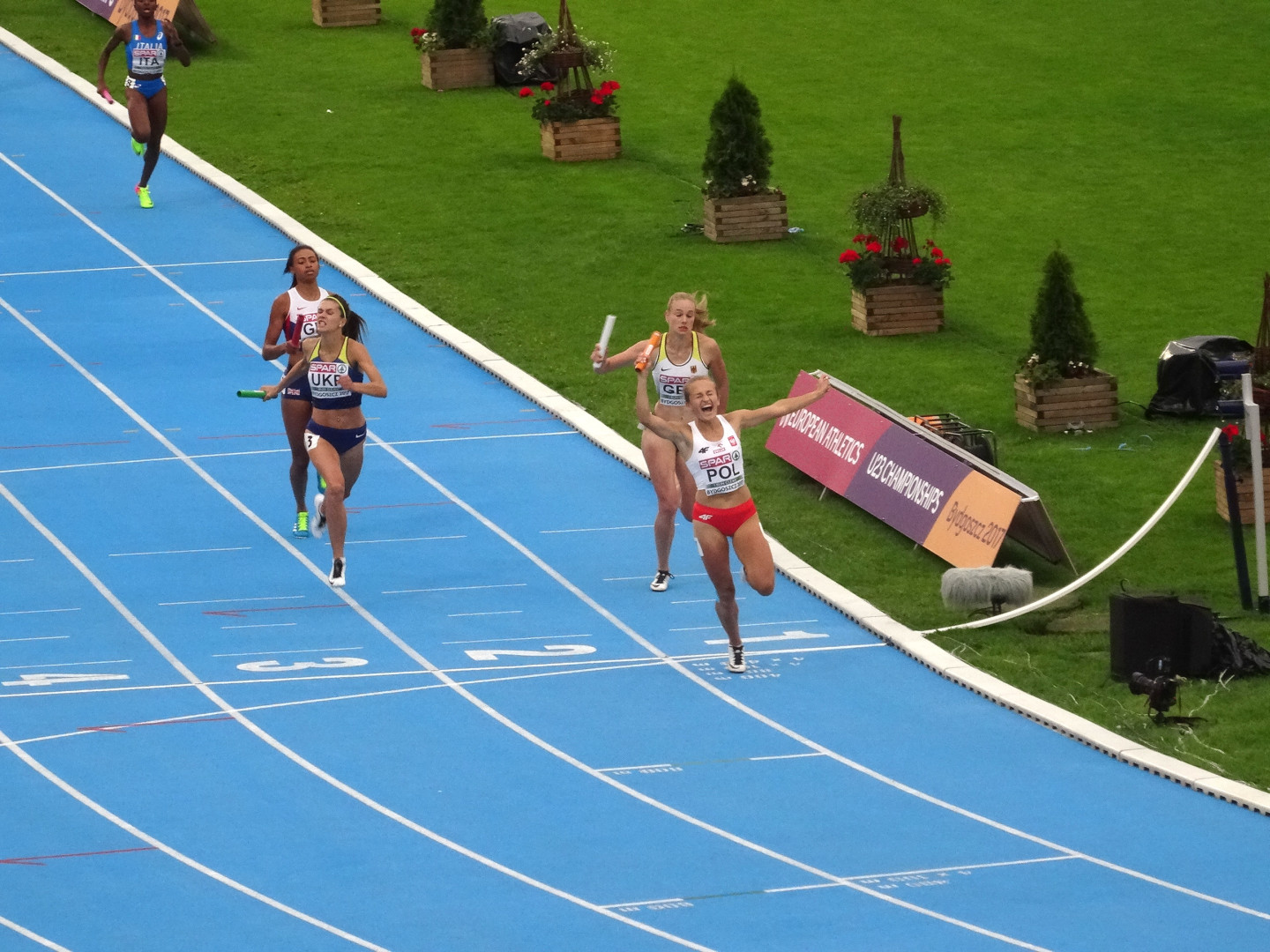
The finish
