= Athletics at the 2017 Summer Universiade – Women's 4 × 100 metres relay =

The women's 4 × 100 metres relay event at the 2017 Summer Universiade was held on 27 and 28 August at the Taipei Municipal Stadium.

== Medalists ==
Gold	Silver	Bronze
Switzerland (SUI); Ajla Del Ponte; Salomé Kora; Cornelia Halbheer; Selina von Jackowski	Poland (POL); Kamila Ciba; Agata Forkasiewicz; Małgorzata Kołdej; Karolina Zagajewska	Japan (JPN); Sayaka Takeuchi; Mizuki Nakamura; Ichiko Iki; Miyu Maeyama

== Results ==
=== Heats ===
Qualification: First 2 teams in each heat (Q) and the next 2 fastest (q) qualified for the final.

Rank	Heat	Nation	Athletes	Time	Notes
1	2	Poland	Kamila Ciba, Agata Forkasiewicz, Małgorzata Kołdej, Karolina Zagajewska	44.10	Q
2	2	Kazakhstan	Rima Kashafutdinova, Viktoriya Zyabkina, Svetlana Golendova, Olga Safronova	44.14	Q
3	1	Switzerland	Ajla Del Ponte, Salomé Kora, Cornelia Halbheer, Selina von Jackowski	44.23	Q
4	2	Italy	Luminosa Bogliolo, Irene Siragusa, Anna Bongiorni, Ayomide Folorunso	44.56	q
5	3	Japan	Sayaka Takeuchi, Mizuki Nakamura, Ichiko Iki, Miyu Maeyama	44.71	Q, SB
6	3	Mexico	Natali Brito, Dania Aguillón, Paola Morán, Iza Daniela Flores	44.87	Q, SB
7	2	United States	Justice Henderson, Samiyah Samuels, Tori Williams, Sierra Smith	45.15	q
8	3	Canada	Nyoka Maxwell, Jellisa Westney, Leah Walkeden, Sandra Latrace	45.25	
9	2	Chinese Taipei	Hsu Ya-ting, Ko Ching-ting, Syu Yong-jie, Hu Chia-chen	45.26	SB
10	1	Australia	Jasmine Everett, Gabriella O'Grady, Elizabeth Hedding, Larissa Pasternatsky	45.47	Q, SB
11	1	Thailand	Parichat Charoensuk, Kanyarat Pakdee, Tassaporn Wannakit, Supawan Thipat	45.60	
12	1	Latvia	Diāna Daktere, Anna Paula Auziņa, Ingūna Čeiko, Gunta Latiševa-Čudare	46.16	SB
13	2	Denmark	Annemarie Nissen, Mathilde Kramer, Astrid Glenner-Frandsen, Mette Graversgaard	46.29	SB
14	3	Serbia	Ivana Petković, Nikoleta Šimić, Katarina Sirmić, Zorana Barjaktarović	46.35	
15	3	Uganda	Scovia Ayikoru, Mary Unyuthfua, Margaret Apolot, Leni Shida	47.05	
16	3	Botswana	Titose Chilume, Tsaone Sebele, Amantle Monwa, Ontiretse Molapisi	48.40	
	1	Dominican Republic	Kiara Rodríguez, Estrella de Aza, Anabel Medina Ventura, Marileidy Paulino	DQ	R170.7
	3	South Africa	Justine Palframan, Maryke Brits, Lynique Prinsloo, Tamzin Thomas	DQ	R163.3a
	1	Slovenia		DNS	

=== Final ===
Rank	Lane	Nation	Athletes	Time	Notes
1st place, gold medalist(s)	6	Switzerland	Ajla Del Ponte, Salomé Kora, Cornelia Halbheer, Selina von Jackowski	43.81	
2nd place, silver medalist(s)	4	Poland	Kamila Ciba, Agata Forkasiewicz, Małgorzata Kołdej, Karolina Zagajewska	44.19	
3rd place, bronze medalist(s)	3	Japan	Sayaka Takeuchi, Mizuki Nakamura, Ichiko Iki, Miyu Maeyama	44.56	SB
4	8	Mexico	Natali Brito, Dania Aguillón, Paola Morán, Iza Daniela Flores	44.79	SB
5	7	Australia	Jasmine Everett, Gabriella O'Grady, Elizabeth Hedding, Larissa Pasternatsky	45.15	SB
	1	Italy	Luminosa Bogliolo, Irene Siragusa, Anna Bongiorni, Ayomide Folorunso	DNF	
	5	Kazakhstan	Rima Kashafutdinova, Viktoriya Zyabkina, Svetlana Golendova, Olga Safronova	DQ	R163.3a
	2	United States	Justice Henderson, Samiyah Samuels, Tori Williams, Sierra Smith	DQ	R170.7
