= Olena Kolesnichenko =

Ukrainian hurdler (born 1993)

Olena Kolesnychenko
Personal information
- Born: 3 June 1993 (age 33) Rivne, Ukraine
- Education: Rivne state university of humanities, National university of water and environmental engineering
- Height: 1.72 m (5 ft 7 1/2 in)
- Weight: 57 kg (126 lb)

Sport
- Sport: Athletics
- Event: 400 metres hurdles
- Club: Rivne Running Club
Medal record
Women's athletics
Representing Ukraine
European Team Championships
Bronze medal – third place	2017 Lille	400 m hurdles
Universiade
Bronze medal – third place	2017 Taipei	400 m hurdles

Olena Kolesnychenko (Ukrainian: Олена Колесниченко; born 3 June 1993 in Rivne) is a Ukrainian athlete specialising in the 400 metres hurdles.

Her personal best in the event is 55.48 seconds set in Lutsk in 2016.

== International competitions ==
Year	Competition	Venue	Position	Event	Notes
Representing Ukraine
2009	European Youth Olympic Festival	Tampere, Finland	7th	400 m hurdles	56.89
2010	Youth Olympic Games	Singapore	3rd	400 m hurdles	59.25
2012	World Junior Championships	Barcelona, Spain	4th	400 m hurdles	58.10
2014	European Championships	Zürich, Switzerland	19th (h)	400 m hurdles	58.04
2015	European U23 Championships	Tallinn, Estonia	6th	400 m hurdles	56.83
2015	European U23 Championships	Tallinn, Estonia	5th	4 × 400 m relay	3:32.86
2016	European Championships	Amsterdam, Netherlands	14th (sf)	400 m hurdles	56.84
2016	Olympic Games	Rio de Janeiro, Brazil	20th (sf)	400 m hurdles	56.77
2017	World Championships	London, United Kingdom	28th (h)	400 m hurdles	56.88
2017	Universiade	Taipei, Taiwan	3rd	400 m hurdles	56.14
2017	Universiade	Taipei, Taiwan	1st (h)	4 × 400 m relay	3:31.76
