= Tetyana Melnyk =

Ukrainian hurdler and sprinter (born 1995)

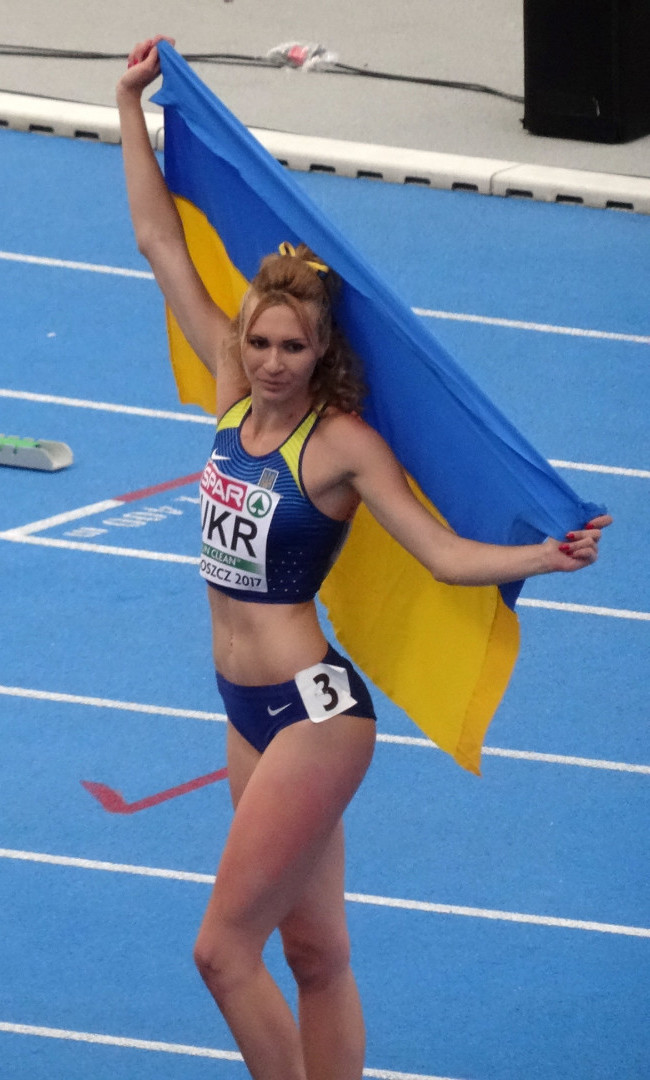
- Tetyana Melnyk in 2017

Personal information
- Nationality: Ukrainian
- Born: April 2, 1995 (age 31) Oleksandrivka, Ukraine
- Height: 1.85 m (6 ft 1 in)
- Weight: 63 kg (139 lb)

Sport
- Sport: Track and field
- Event(s): 400 metres, 400 m hurdles

Achievements and titles
- Personal best(s): 400 m: 51.92 (2016); 400 m hurdles: 57.40 (2016)
Medal record
Women's athletics
Representing Ukraine
European Indoor Championships
Bronze medal – third place	2017 Belgrade	4×400 m relay
Summer Universiade
Gold medal – first place	2019 Naples	4×400 m relay

Tetyana Yuriivna Melnyk (Ukrainian: Тетяна Юріївна Мельник; born 2 April 1995) is a Ukrainian track and field sprinter and hurdler who competes in the 400 metres flat and 400 metres hurdles. She represented her country at the 2016, 2020, and 2024 Summer Olympics. Her personal bests are 51.92 seconds for the 400 m and 57.40 seconds for the 400 m hurdles.

She competed in the hurdles at the 2014 World Junior Championships in Athletics, reaching the semi-finals. She was part of the Ukrainian 4 × 400 metres relay team at the 2016 European Athletics Championships with Yuliya Olishevska, Olha Bibik and Olha Zemlyak. Alina Lohvynenko replaced Olishevska for the Ukrainian Olympic team that took fifth in the relay final.

== Personal bests ==
- 200 metres – 24.29 (2014)
- 400 metres – 51.92 (2016)
- 60 metres hurdles – 8.96 (2013)
- 400 metres hurdles – 57.40 (2016)
- 4 × 400 metres relay – 3:24.54 min (2016)
- 4 × 400 metres relay indoor – 3:44.60 min (2015)

All information from All-Athletics profile.

== International competitions ==
Year	Competition	Venue	Position	Event	Time	Notes
2014	World Junior Championships	Eugene, United States	11th (sf)	400 m hurdles	59.37	
2016	European Championships	Amsterdam, Netherlands	6th	4 × 400 m relay	3:27.64	
2016	Olympic Games	Rio de Janeiro, Brazil	5th	4 × 400 m relay	3:26.64	
2017	European U23 Championships	Bydgoszcz, Poland	3rd	4 × 400 m relay	3:30.22	
2017	World Championships	London, United Kingdom	12th (h)	4 × 400 m relay	3:31.84	
2017	Universiade	Taipei, Taiwan	1st (h)	4 × 400 m relay	3:31.76^{1}	
2018	World Indoor Championships	Birmingham, United Kingdom	4th	4 × 400 m relay	3:31.32	
2018	European Championships	Berlin, Germany	17th (sf)	400 m	52.20	
2018	European Championships	Berlin, Germany	–	4 × 400 m relay		DQ
2019	European Indoor Championships	Glasgow, United Kingdom	20th (h)	400 m	53.39	
2019	World Relays	Yokohama, Japan	–	4 × 400 m relay		DQ
2019	Universiade	Naples, Italy	4th	400 m	52.02	
2019	Universiade	Naples, Italy	1st	4 × 400 m relay	3:30.82	
2019	World Championships	Doha, Qatar	6th	4 × 400 m relay	3:27.48	
2021	Olympic Games	Tokyo, Japan	40th (h)	400 m	54.99	
2024	European Championships	Rome, Italy	20th (h)	400 m	54.06	
2024	Olympic Games	Paris, France	14th (h)	4 × 400 m mixed	3:15.51	
2025	European Indoor Championships	Apeldoorn, Netherlands	–	400 m	DQ	

^{1}Disqualified in the final
