= 2018 IAAF World Indoor Championships – Women's 400 metres =

Women's 400 metres at the 2018 IAAF World Indoor Championships
- Venue: Arena Birmingham
- Dates: 2–3 March
- Competitors: 34
- Winning time: 50.55

Medalists
gold medal	Courtney Okolo	United States
silver medal	Shakima Wimbley	United States
bronze medal	Eilidh Doyle	Great Britain

Video on YouTube Official Video

The women's 400 metres at the 2018 IAAF World Indoor Championships took place on 2 and 3 March 2018.

== Summary ==
The two Americans with the fastest times in the semi-final round, Shakima Wimbley and Courtney Okolo were given the outer two lanes in the final, 5 and 6 respectively. Wimbley started quickly, making up a little ground on Okolo's stagger, while Okolo took a more measured approach to her speed, putting on a burst just before the cones, then taking the tangent to lane 1 to take the lead unobstructed. Wimbley closed in much sooner, forcing Eilidh Doyle to squeeze inside to take second position with a lap to go. Okolo just continued to extend her lead, seven metres by the finish for a clear win. Wimbley ran on Doyle's outside through most of the last lap, finally conceding to run the last part of the last turn behind Doyle. On the final straightaway, Wimbley took one more run at Doyle, passing her for the silver. Justyna Święty-Ersetic also closed quickly but could not catch Doyle for bronze.

== Results ==
=== Heats ===
The heats were started on 2 March at 12:10.

Rank	Heat	Lane	Name	Nationality	Time	Notes
1	1	5	Courtney Okolo	United States	51.54	Q
2	5	4	Stephenie Ann McPherson	Jamaica	52.18	Q, SB
3	1	6	Maria Belibasaki	Greece	52.27	Q, PB
4	5	5	Eilidh Doyle	Great Britain	52.31	Q
5	4	5	Shakima Wimbley	United States	52.43	Q
6	2	6	Léa Sprunger	Switzerland	52.46	Q
7	2	5	Madiea Ghafoor	Netherlands	52.54	Q
8	3	6	Zoey Clark	Great Britain	52.75	Q
9	5	6	Phil Healy	Ireland	52.75	q
10	2	3	Nadine Gonska	Germany	52.77	q, PB
11	5	3	Alexandra Bezeková	Slovakia	52.78	q
12	4	3	Agnė Šerkšnienė	Lithuania	52.81	Q, NR
13	1	2	Anna Yaroshchuk-Ryzhykova	Ukraine	52.96	q, PB
14	4	2	Raphaela Boaheng Lukudo	Italy	52.98	q, PB
15	3	5	Justyna Święty-Ersetic	Poland	53.05	Q
16	1	4	Lada Vondrová	Czech Republic	53.05	q
17	4	4	Patrycja Wyciszkiewicz	Poland	53.22	
18	3	1	Ayomide Folorunso	Italy	53.24	
19	3	3	Kelsey Balkwill	Canada	53.29	
20	2	4	Travia Jones	Canada	53.31	
21	6	5	Tovea Jenkins	Jamaica	53.39	Q
22	3	4	Svetlana Golendova	Kazakhstan	53.44	
23	4	6	Anita Horvat	Slovenia	53.52	
24	5	2	Tamara Salaški	Serbia	53.61	
25	2	1	Laura Bueno	Spain	53.66	
26	1	3	Elina Mikhina	Kazakhstan	53.90	
27	5	1	Grace Claxton	Puerto Rico	53.92	
28	6	4	Iveta Putalová	Slovakia	53.97	Q
29	6	1	Cátia Azevedo	Portugal	54.17	
30	3	2	Kineke Alexander	Saint Vincent and the Grenadines	55.46	
31	6	2	Djénébou Danté	Mali	57.85	SB
	6	3	Maja Ćirić	Serbia	DQ	163.3(a)
	2	2	Miriama Senokonoko	Fiji	DQ	163.3(a)
	6	6	Patience Okon George	Nigeria	DNS	

=== Semifinal ===
The semifinals were started on 2 March at 20:32.

Rank	Heat	Lane	Name	Nationality	Time	Notes
1	1	5	Shakima Wimbley	United States	51.34	Q
2	3	5	Courtney Okolo	United States	51.79	Q
3	1	4	Eilidh Doyle	Great Britain	52.15	Q
4	3	6	Tovea Jenkins	Jamaica	52.42	Q
5	1	3	Agnė Šerkšnienė	Lithuania	52.62	NR
6	2	3	Justyna Święty-Ersetic	Poland	52.63	Q
7	2	6	Zoey Clark	Great Britain	52.63	Q
8	1	2	Anna Yaroshchuk-Ryzhykova	Ukraine	52.74	PB
9	1	1	Alexandra Bezeková	Slovakia	53.05	
10	2	4	Madiea Ghafoor	Netherlands	53.14	
11	2	2	Raphaela Boaheng Lukudo	Italy	53.18	
12	3	1	Phil Healy	Ireland	53.26	
13	3	2	Lada Vondrová	Czech Republic	53.32	
14	2	1	Nadine Gonska	Germany	53.45	
15	3	3	Iveta Putalová	Slovakia	53.46	
	1	6	Léa Sprunger	Switzerland	DQ	163.3(a)
	3	4	Maria Belibasaki	Greece	DQ	163.3(a)
	2	5	Stephenie Ann McPherson	Jamaica	DQ	163.3(a)

=== Final ===
The final was started on 3 March at 20:05.

Rank	Lane	Name	Nationality	Time	Notes
1st place, gold medalist(s)	6	Courtney Okolo	United States	50.55	PB
2nd place, silver medalist(s)	5	Shakima Wimbley	United States	51.47	
3rd place, bronze medalist(s)	4	Eilidh Doyle	Great Britain	51.60	SB
4	3	Justyna Święty-Ersetic	Poland	51.85	
5	1	Tovea Jenkins	Jamaica	52.12	PB
6	2	Zoey Clark	Great Britain	52.16	
