= Ayomide Folorunso =

Italian hurdler (born 1996)

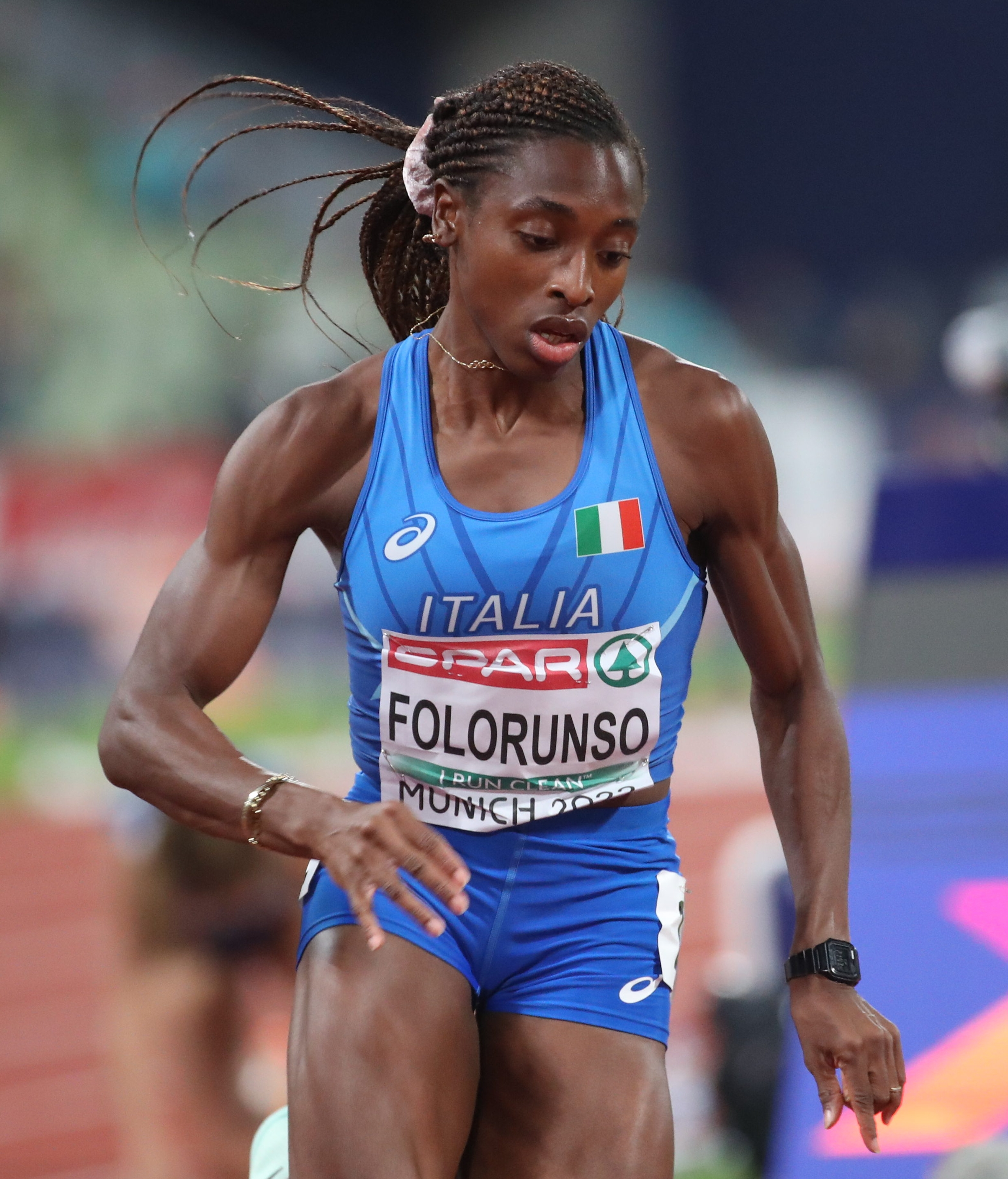
- Folorunso in 2022

Personal information
- Full name: Ayomide Temilade Oluwatoyosi Folorunso
- Nationality: Nigerian, Italian
- Born: 17 October 1996 (age 30) Abeokuta, Nigeria
- Education: University of Parma
- Height: 1.70 m (5 ft 7 in)
- Weight: 55 kg (121 lb)

Sport
- Country: Italy
- Sport: Athletics
- Events: 400 metres, 400 metres hurdles
- Club: Fiamme Oro
- Coached by: Laurent Meuwly

Achievements and titles
- Personal bests: 400 m: 52.01 (2023); 400 m hs: 53.89 (2023)
Medal record
Women's athletics
Representing Italy
European Indoor Championships
Bronze medal – third place	2019 Glasgow	4×400 m relay
IAAF World Relays
Bronze medal – third place	2019 Yokohama	4×400 m relay
European Games
Silver medal – second place	2023 Kraków-Małopolska	400 m hurdles
Universiade
Gold medal – first place	2017 Taipei	400 m hs
Gold medal – first place	2019 Naples	400 m hs
Mediterranean Games
Gold medal – first place	2018 Tarragona	4x400 m relay
Gold medal – first place	2026 Taranto	400 m hs
Silver medal – second place	2018 Tarragona	400 m hs
European U23 Championships
Gold medal – first place	2017 Bydgoszcz	400 m hs
European Junior Championships
Silver medal – second place	2015 Eskilstuna	400 m hs
Bronze medal – third place	2015 Eskilstuna	4x400 m relay

Ayomide Temilade Oluwatoyosi Folorunso (born 17 October 1996) is a Nigerian-Italian athlete specialising in the 400 metres hurdles. She competed in the 4 × 400 metres relay at the 2015 World Championships in Beijing.

== Career ==
Her family is originally from Nigeria, but since 2004 Ayomide has settled with her parents, mother Mariam and father Emmanuel, a mining geologist, in Fidenza. She failed to wear the azzurro at the 2013 World Youth Championships in Athletics despite having obtained the minimum in five specialties, because she received her Italian passport a few days after the world championship, therefore she is member of the Italy national athletics team.

== National records ==
- 400 metres hurdles: 53.89 at the 2023 World Championships semi-finals in Budapest, Hungary, 22 August 2023.
- 4x400 metres relay indoor: 3:31.55 (Birmingham, England, 4 March 2018) - current holder with Chiara Bazzoni, Raphaela Lukudo, Maria Enrica Spacca

== Achievements ==
Year	Competition	Venue	Position	Event	Notes
Representing Italy
2014	World Junior Championships	Eugene, United States	7th	400 m hurdles	58.34
2015	European Junior Championships	Eskilstuna, Sweden	3rd	400 m hurdles	58.44
2015	European Junior Championships	Eskilstuna, Sweden	2nd	4 × 400 m relay	3:37.45
2015	World Championships	Beijing, China	9th (h)	4 × 400 m relay	3:27.07
2016	European Championships	Amsterdam, Netherlands	4th	400 m hurdles	55.50
2016	Olympic Games	Rio de Janeiro, Brazil	19th (sf)	400 m hurdles	56.37
2016	Olympic Games	Rio de Janeiro, Brazil	6th	4 × 400 m relay	3:27.05
2017	European Indoor Championships	Belgrade, Serbia	4th	4 × 400 m relay	3:32.87
2017	European U23 Championships	Bydgoszcz, Poland	1st	400 m hurdles	55.82
2017	European U23 Championships	Bydgoszcz, Poland	5th	4 × 400 m relay	3:33.31
2017	Universiade	Taipei, Taiwan	1st	400 m hurdles	55.63
2017	Universiade	Taipei, Taiwan	4th (h)	4 × 100 m relay	44.56^{1}
2018	World Indoor Championships	Birmingham, United Kingdom	18th (h)	400 m	53.24
2018	World Indoor Championships	Birmingham, United Kingdom	5th	4 × 400 m relay	3:31.55
2018	Mediterranean Games	Tarragona, Spain	2nd	400 m hurdle	55.44
2018	Mediterranean Games	Tarragona, Spain	1st	4 × 400 m relay	3:28.08
2018	European Championships	Berlin, Germany	8th (sf)	400 m hurdles	55.69
2018	European Championships	Berlin, Germany	5th	4 × 400 m relay	3:28.62
2019	European Indoor Championships	Glasgow, United Kingdom	18th (sf)	400 m	57.96
2019	European Indoor Championships	Glasgow, United Kingdom	3rd	4 × 400 m relay	3:31.90
2019	World Relays	Yokohama, Japan	3rd	4 × 400 m relay	3:27.74
2019	Universiade	Naples, Italy	1st	400 m hurdles	54.75
2019	World Championships	Doha, Qatar	13th (sf)	400 m hurdles	55.36
2019	World Championships	Doha, Qatar	9th (h)	4 × 400 m relay	3:27.57
2021	World Relays	Chorzów, Poland	5th	4 × 400 m relay	3:32.69
2022	World Championships	Eugene, United States	10th (sf)	400 m hurdles	54.34
2022	World Championships	Eugene, United States	7th	4 × 400 m relay	3:26.45
2022	European Championships	Munich, Germany	7th	400 m hurdles	55.91
2023	European Indoor Championships	Istanbul, Turkey	2nd	4 × 400 m relay	3:28.61
2023	World Championships	Budapest, Hungary	6th	400 m hurdles	54.19
2023	World Championships	Budapest, Hungary	6th (h)	4 × 400 m relay	3:23.86
2024	World Indoor Championships	Glasgow, United Kingdom	18th (h)	400 m	53.15
2024	European Championships	Rome, Italy	5th	400 m hurdles	55.20
2024	Olympic Games	Paris, France	16th (sf)	400 m hurdles	54.92
2025	World Championships	Tokyo, Japan	12th (sf)	400 m hurdles	54.37
2026	European Championships	Birmingham, United Kingdom	5th	400 m hurdles	54.29
2026	Mediterranean Games	Taranto, Italy	1st	400 m hurdles	54.22
2026	World Ultimate Championship	Budapest, Hungary	13th (h)	400 m hurdles	54.57

^{1}Did not finish in the final

=== Circuit performances ===
Grand Slam Track results
Slam	Race group	Event	Pl.	Time	Prize money
2025 Philadelphia Slam	Long hurdles	400 m hurdles	7th	57.90	US$12,500
2025 Philadelphia Slam	Long hurdles	400 m	7th	53.88	US$12,500

== Personal bests ==
Outdoor

- 100 metres: 11.83 (+0.5 m/s) – Rubiera, Italy, 13 September 2016
- 200 metres: 23.53 (+0.7 m/s) – Casalmaggiore, Italy, 12 September 2016
- 400 metres: 52.25 – Modena, Italy, 5 May 2016
- 400 metres hurdles: 53.89 – Budapest, Hungary, 22 August 2023

Indoor

- 200 metres: 23.86 – Padua, Italy, 2016
- 400 metres: 52.97 – Madrid, Spain, 2017

== National titles ==
Folorunso won 11 national championships at individual senior level.

- Italian Athletics Championships
  - 400 metres hurdles: 2016, 2019, 2020, 2022, 2023, 2026 (6)
- Italian Athletics Indoor Championships
  - 400 metres: 2016, 2017, 2020, 2023, 2024 (5)

== See also ==
- List of Italian records in athletics
- Italian all-time lists - 400 metres hurdles
- Italian national track relay team
- Naturalized athletes of Italy
- List of eligibility transfers in athletics
