= Paola Morán =

Mexican sprinter (born 1997)

- Morán in 2016

Personal information
- Full name: Paola Morán Errejón
- Born: 25 February 1997 (age 29) Guadalajara, Mexico
- Education: ARTE AC Technological Institute of Monterrey
- Height: 1.69 m (5 ft 7 in)

Sport
- Sport: Athletics
- Event: 400 m
Medal record
Representing Mexico
Pan American Games
Silver medal – second place	2019 Lima	400 m

Paola Morán Errejón (born 25 February 1997) is a Mexican sprinter who specializes in the 400 metres. She won two medals at the 2019 Summer Universiade.

She finished 9th at the 2019 World Championships in Doha, Qatar.

== International competitions ==
Year	Competition	Venue	Position	Event	Notes
Representing Mexico
2014	Central American and Caribbean; Junior Championships (U18)	Morelia, Mexico	6th	100 m hurdles (76.2m)	14.36
2014	Central American and Caribbean; Junior Championships (U18)	Morelia, Mexico	1st	400 m hurdles	62.18
2014	Youth Olympic Games	Nanjing, China	1st (B)	400 m hurdles	59.74
2015	Pan American Junior Championships	Edmonton, Canada	4th	400 m	53.10
2015	Pan American Junior Championships	Edmonton, Canada	3rd (h)	400 m hurdles	58.81^{1}
2015	Pan American Games	Toronto, Canada	9th (h)	4 × 400 m relay	3:32.29
2016	World U20 Championships	Bydgoszcz, Poland	11th (sf)	400 m	53.08
2017	Universiade	Taipei, Taiwan	7th	400 m	52.96
2017	Universiade	Taipei, Taiwan	4th	4 × 100 m relay	44.79
2017	Universiade	Taipei, Taiwan	2nd	4 × 400 m relay	3:33.98
2019	Universiade	Naples, Italy	1st	400 m	51.52
2019	Universiade	Naples, Italy	2nd	4 × 400 m relay	3:32.63
2019	Pan American Games	Lima, Peru	2nd	400 m	51.02
2019	World Championships	Doha, Qatar	9th (sf)	400 m	51.08
2021	Olympic Games	Tokyo, Japan	14th (sf)	400 m	51.06
2022	Ibero-American Championships	La Nucía, Spain	9th (h)	400 m	53.83
2022	World Championships	Eugene, United States	27th (h)	400 m	52.28
2023	Central American and Caribbean Games	San Salvador, El Salvador	5th	400 m	51.93
2023	World Championships	Budapest, Hungary	17th (sf)	400 m	51.46
2024	Olympic Games	Paris, France	13th (sf)	400 m	50.73

^{1}Did not finish in the final

== Personal bests ==
Outdoor

- 200 metres – 24.03 (+0.8 m/s, Monterrey 2017)
- 400 metres – 51.02 (Lima, Peru 2019)
- 400 metres hurdles – 56.55 (Chihuahua 2019)
