= Jessica Turner =

English hurdler (born1995)

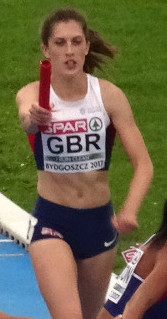
- Turner in 2017

Personal information
- Full name: Jessica Ann Turner
- Born: 8 August 1995 (age 31) Derby, England
- Education: Loughborough University
- Height: 1.77 m (5 ft 10 in)
- Weight: 59 kg (130 lb)

Sport
- Sport: Athletics
- Event: 400 m hurdles
- Club: Amber Valley
- Coached by: Nick Dakin (2013–); Jim and Julie Feeney (2011-2013)

Jessica Ann Turner (born 8 August 1995) is an English athlete specialising in the 400 metres hurdles. She represented Great Britain at the 2017 World Championships reaching the semifinals. In addition, she won a silver medal at the 2017 European U23 Championships.

Her personal best in the event is 50.08 seconds set in Bydgoszcz in 2017.

== International competitions ==
Year	Competition	Venue	Position	Event	Notes
Representing Great Britain and England
2013	European Junior Championships	Rieti, Italy	15th (sf)	400 m hurdles	61.09
2014	World Junior Championships	Eugene, United States	17th (sf)	400 m hurdles	60.39
2017	European U23 Championships	Bydgoszcz, Poland	2nd	400 m hurdles	56.08
2017	European U23 Championships	Bydgoszcz, Poland	4th	4 × 400 m relay	3:30.74
2017	World Championships	London, United Kingdom	31st (h)	400 m hurdles	56.98
2017	Universiade	Taipei, Taiwan	5th	400 m hurdles	57.45
2018	Commonwealth Games	Gold Coast, Australia	14th (h)	400 m hurdles	58.26
2019	World Championships	Doha, Qatar	20th (sf)	400 m hurdles	55.87
2019	World Championships	Doha, Qatar	4th (h)	4 × 400 m relay	3:24.99
2021	World Relays	Chorzów, Poland	5th (h)	4 × 400 m relay	3:28.83
2021	Olympic Games	Tokyo, Japan	23rd (sf)	400 m hurdles	60.36
