= Patrycja Wyciszkiewicz =

Polish sprinter

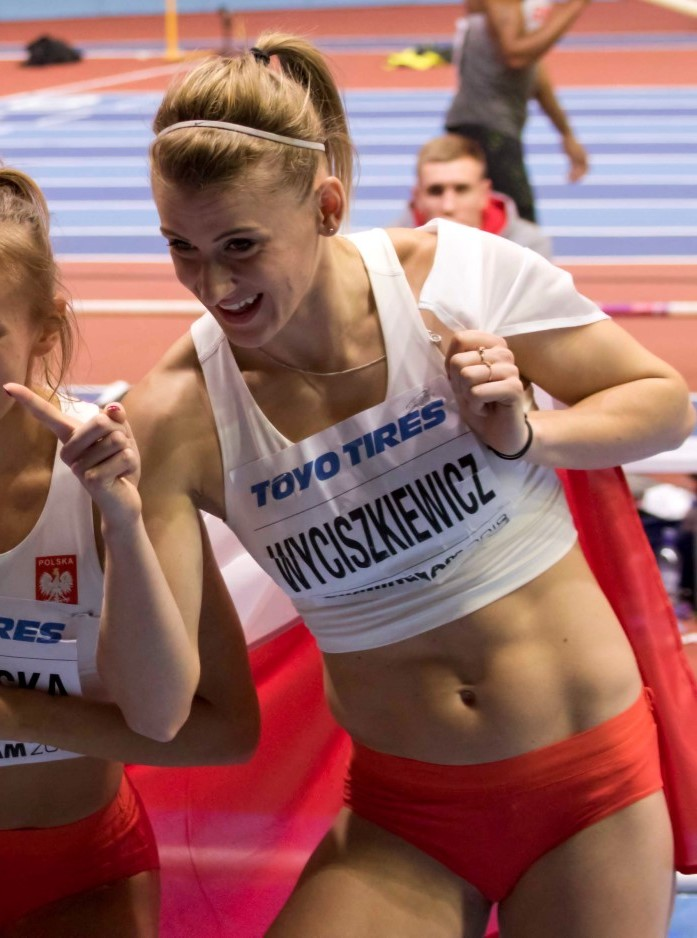
- Wyciszkiewicz in 2018

Personal information
- Nationality: Polish
- Born: 8 January 1994 (age 32) Śrem, Poland
- Height: 1.73 m (5 ft 8 in)
- Weight: 58 kg (128 lb)

Sport
- Country: Poland
- Sport: Athletics
- Event: Sprinting
- Club: SL Olimpia Poznań
- Coached by: Edward Motyl
Medal record
Women's athletics
Representing Poland
World Championships
Silver medal – second place	2019 Doha	4 × 400 m relay
Bronze medal – third place	2017 London	4 × 400 m relay
World Indoor Championships
Silver medal – second place	2018 Birmingham	4 × 400 m relay
European Championships
Gold medal – first place	2018 Berlin	4 × 400 m relay
European Indoor Championships
Gold medal – first place	2017 Belgrade	4 × 400 m relay
World Relay Championships
Gold medal – first place	2019 Yokohama	4 × 400 m relay
Summer Universiade
Gold medal – first place	2017 Taipei	4 × 400 m relay
European U23 Championships
Silver medal – second place	2015 Tallinn	4 × 400 m relay
Bronze medal – third place	2015 Tallinn	400 m

Patrycja Wyciszkiewicz-Zawadzka (Polish pronunciation: [paˈtrɨ.t͡sja vɨ.t͡ɕiʂˈkjɛ.vit͡ʂ]; born 8 January 1994) is a Polish sprinter specialising in the 400 metres. She competed in the 4 × 400 m relay event at the 2012 Summer Olympics.

== International competitions ==
Year	Competition	Venue	Position	Event	Notes
Representing Poland
2011	World Youth Championships	Lille, France	9th (sf)	400 m	53.97
2011	World Youth Championships	Lille, France	7th	Medley relay	2:10.35
2011	European Junior Championships	Tallinn, Estonia	2nd	4 × 400 m relay	3:35.35
2012	World Junior Championships	Barcelona, Spain	11th (sf)	400 m	53.04
2012	World Junior Championships	Barcelona, Spain	7th	4 × 400 m relay	3:37.90
2012	Olympic Games	London, United Kingdom	13th (h)	4 × 400 m relay	3:30.15
2013	European Junior Championships	Rieti, Italy	1st	400 m	51.56
2013	European Junior Championships	Rieti, Italy	1st	4 × 400 m relay	3:32.63
2013	World Championships	Moscow, Russia	9th (h)	4 × 400 m relay	3:29.75
2014	World Indoor Championships	Sopot, Poland	5th	4 × 400 m relay	3:29.89
2014	World Relays	Nassau, Bahamas	5th	4 × 400 m relay	3:27.37
2014	European Championships	Zürich, Switzerland	17th (h)	400 m	52.73
2014	European Championships	Zürich, Switzerland	5th	4 × 400 m relay	3:25.73
2015	European U23 Championships	Tallinn, Estonia	3rd	400 m	51.63
2015	European U23 Championships	Tallinn, Estonia	2nd	4 × 400 m relay	3:30:24
2015	World Championships	Beijing, China	21st (h)	400 m	51.94
2015	World Championships	Beijing, China	15th (h)	4 × 400 m relay	3:32.83
2016	European Championships	Amsterdam, Netherlands	18th (sf)	400 m	52.92
2016	European Championships	Amsterdam, Netherlands	4th	4 × 400 m relay	3:27.60
2016	Olympic Games	Rio de Janeiro, Brazil	22nd (sf)	400 m	52.51
2016	Olympic Games	Rio de Janeiro, Brazil	7th	4 × 400 m relay	3:27.28
2017	European Indoor Championships	Belgrade, Serbia	1st	4 × 400 m relay	3:29.94
2017	World Championships	London, United Kingdom	6th (h)	4 × 400 m relay	3:26.47
2017	Universiade	Taipei, Taiwan	1st	4 × 400 m relay	3:26.75
2018	World Indoor Championships	Birmingham, United Kingdom	17th (h)	400 m	53.22
2018	World Indoor Championships	Birmingham, United Kingdom	2nd	4 × 400 m relay	3:26.09
2018	European Championships	Berlin, Germany	1st	4 × 400 m relay	3:26.59
2019	World Relays	Yokohama, Japan	1st	4 × 400 m relay	3:27.49
2019	World Championships	Doha, Qatar	2nd	4 × 400 m relay	3:21.89
2023	World Championships	Budapest, Hungary	6th	4 × 400 m relay	3:24.93
