= Martyna Dąbrowska =

Polish sprinter (born 1994)

Personal information
- Born: 5 April 1994 (age 32) Szczecin, Poland
- Height: 176 cm (5 ft 9 in) (2016)
- Weight: 56 kg (123 lb) (2016)

Sport
- Sport: Athletics
- Event(s): 200 metres, 400 metres, 4 × 400 metres relay
- Club: KS Podlasie Białystok
Medal record
Women's athletics
Representing Poland
World Championships
Bronze medal – third place	2017 London	4 × 400 m
European U23 Championships
Silver medal – second place	2015 Tallinn	4 x 400 m

Martyna Dąbrowska (born 5 April 1994) is a Polish sprinter who specialises in the 400 metres. She won a bronze medal in the 4 × 400 metres relay at the 2017 World Championships in London, where she run in the heats. In addition, she was a reserve member of the women's 4 × 400 metres relay for Poland at the 2016 Summer Olympics, but did not run.

== Competition record ==
Year	Competition	Venue	Position	Event	Notes
Representing Poland
2012	World Junior Championships	Barcelona, Spain	7th	4 × 400 m relay	3:37.90
2013	European Junior Championships	Rieti, Italy	1st	4 × 400 m relay	3:32.63
2015	European U23 Championships	Tallinn, Estonia	7th	400 m	52.65
2015	European U23 Championships	Tallinn, Estonia	2nd	4 × 400 m relay	3:30.24
2016	European Championships	Amsterdam, Netherlands	2nd (h)	4 × 400 m relay	3:27.72
2017	World Championships	London, United Kingdom	6th (h)	4 × 400 m relay	3:26.47 (Note: Did not compete in the final where Poland won the bronze)
2017	Universiade	Taipei, Taiwan	2nd (h)	4 × 400 m relay	3:32.62
2018	European Championships	Berlin, Germany	3rd (h)	4 × 400 m relay	3:28.52

== Personal bests ==
=== Outdoor ===
Event	Record	Wind	Venue	Date
200 metres	24.29	-0.4	Białystok	23 June 2012
400 metres	52.23		Bydgoszcz	14 June 2015

=== Indoor ===
Event	Record	Venue	Date
200 metres	23.63	Toruń	22 February 2015
