= Cornelia Halbheer =

Swiss sprinter (born 1992)

Personal information
- Born: 16 August 1992 (age 33)

Sport
- Sport: Athletics
- Event: 200 metres
- Club: LV Winterthur
- Coached by: Pål Johansen

Cornelia Halbheer (born 16 August 1992) is a Swiss sprinter who primarily competes in the 200 metres event. She has represented her country at the 2017 World Championships; however, she did not advance to the semifinals.

== International competitions ==
Year	Competition	Venue	Position	Event	Notes
Representing Switzerland
2009	European Youth Olympic Festival	Tampere, Finland	1st	4 × 100 m relay	46.30
2016	European Championships	Amsterdam, Netherlands	17th (h)	200 m	23.61
2017	World Championships	London, United Kingdom	27th (h)	200 m	23.51
2017	Universiade	Taipei, Taiwan	8th (sf)	200 m	23.80
2017	Universiade	Taipei, Taiwan	1st	4 × 100 m relay	43.81
2018	European Championships	Berlin, Germany	23rd (sf)	200 m	23.98
2019	European Indoor Championships	Glasgow, United Kingdom	6th	4 × 400 m relay	3:33.72
2021	World Relays	Chorzów, Poland	4th (h)	4 × 100 m relay	43.71^{1}

^{1}Disqualified in the final

== Personal bests ==
Outdoor

- 100 metres – 11.44 (+1.0 m/s, Zofingen 2017)
- 200 metres – 23.16 (-0.3 m/s, Zürich 2017)
- 400 metres – 62.25 (Basel 2013)
- Long jump – 5.98 (-0.7 m/s, Langenthal 2016)

Indoor

- 60 metres – 7.47 (Magglingen 2017)
- Long jump – 5.78 (Zürich 2016)
