= Aleksandra Gaworska =

Polish athletics competitor

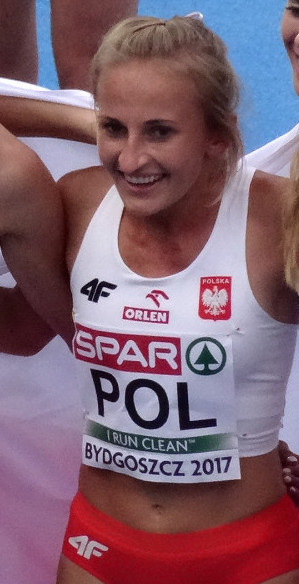
- Aleksandra Gaworska in 2017

Personal information
- Born: 7 November 1995 (age 30) Bełchatów, Poland
- Height: 1.68 m (5 ft 6 in)
- Weight: 51 kg (112 lb)

Sport
- Sport: Athletics
- Event(s): 400 metres, 400 metres hurdles
- Club: BKL Bełchatów (2010–2013); UKS 55 Łódź (2014–2015); KS AZS AWF Kraków
- Coached by: Andrzej Giza
Medal record
Women's athletics
Representing Poland
World Championships
Bronze medal – third place	2017 London	4×400 m relay
World Indoor Championships
Silver medal – second place	2018 Birmingham	4×400 m relay
Bronze medal – third place	2022 Belgrade	4×400 m relay
European Indoor Championships
Bronze medal – third place	2021 Toruń	4×400 m relay
European U23 Championships
Gold medal – first place	2017 Bydgoszcz	4 × 400 m

Aleksandra Gaworska (born 7 November 1995) is a Polish sprinter competing in the 400 metres and 400 metres hurdles. She won a bronze medal in the 4 × 400 metres relay at the 2017 World Championships.

== International competitions ==
Year	Competition	Venue	Position	Event	Notes
Representing Poland
2017	European U23 Championships	Bydgoszcz, Poland	4th	400 m hurdles	56.94
2017	European U23 Championships	Bydgoszcz, Poland	1st	4 x 400 m relay	3:29.66
2017	World Championships	London, United Kingdom	3rd	4 × 400 m relay	3:25.41
2017	Universiade	Taipei, Taiwan	4th	400 m hurdles	57.25
2017	Universiade	Taipei, Taiwan	2nd (h)	4 × 400 m relay	3:32.62
2018	World Indoor Championships	Birmingham, United Kingdom	2nd	4 × 400 m relay	3:26.09
2021	European Indoor Championships	Toruń, Poland	3rd	4 × 400 m relay	3:29.94
2022	World Indoor Championships	Belgrade, Serbia	3rd (h)	4 × 400 m relay	3:30.51

== Personal bests ==
Outdoor

- 400 metres – 52.45 (Bydgoszcz 2017)
- 400 metres hurdles – 56.87 (Radom 2017)

Indoor

- 400 metres – 54.20 (Spała 2017)
