= Zoe Sherar =

Canadian sprinter

Personal information
- Born: November 7, 1999 (age 26) Toronto, Ontario, Canada
- Education: University of Guelph
- Height: 5 ft 8 in (173 cm)

Sport
- Sport: Track and field
- Events: 400 m, 4 × 400 m relay
- University team: Guelph Gryphons

Achievements and titles
- Personal bests: Outdoor; 200 m: 23.02 (Gainesville 2024); 400 m: 51.63 (Miramar 2024); Indoor; 300 m: 37.44 (Windsor 2022); 400 m: 52.50 (Clemson 2023)
Medal record
Women's track and field
Representing Canada
World Athletics Relays
Silver medal – second place	2019 Yokohama	4 × 400 m mixed
Bronze medal – third place	2024 Nassau	4×400 m relay
Bronze medal – third place	2026 Gaborone	4×400 m relay

Zoe Sherar (born November 7, 1999) is a Canadian sprinter who specializes in the 400 metres. As part of the Canadian women's 4 × 400 metres relay team, she finished fourth at the 2022 and 2023 World Athletics Championships.

== Athletics career ==
=== University of Guelph ===
After graduating from Bloor Collegiate Institute in 2017, Sherar enrolled at the University of Guelph where she competed with the Guelph Gryphons track and field team. Competing for Guelph from 2017 to 2023, she won 12 USPORTS individual and relay titles, in addition to contributing to 5 consecutive team titles for the Guelph women.

Her 12 titles:

- 300 metres: 2019, 2020, 2022, 2023
- 4 × 200 m relay: 2019, 2020, 2022, 2023
- 4 × 400 m relay: 2019, 2020, 2022, 2023

In February 2020, alongside Guelph teammates Morgan Byng, Shyvonne Roxborough, and Tessa Hamilton, she set a Canadian record in the indoor 4 × 200 m relay, clocking a time of 1:36.10.

Sherar was named Guelph athlete of the year for the 2019–20 and 2022–23 seasons.

=== International Competitions ===
==== 2019 ====
Sherar made her international debut representing Canada in 2019 at the IAAF World Relays in Yokohoma, Japan. As part of Canada's mixed 4 × 400 m relay team, she won a silver medal with teammates Austin Cole, Aiyanna Stiverne, and Philip Osei. With their time of 3:18.15, the team also set a new Canadian record.

Later that summer, she represented Canada at the World University Games in Napoli, Italy, competing in individual 400 m and the 4 × 400 m relay. Individually, she missed the final despite clocking a time of 52.50 after taking fourth in her semi-final heat. In the relay, she and the Canadian team took fifth place, missing a podium spot by 0.65 seconds.

==== 2022 ====
In 2022, Sherar competed in the 4 × 400 metres relay at the World Championships in Eugene, Oregon. The Canadian quartet of Natassha McDonald, Aiyanna Stiverne, Kyra Constantine, and Sherar took fourth in at time of 3:25.18.

The following year in the 4 × 400 metres relay at the 2023 World Championships in Budapest, Hungary, Sherar and the Canadian team finished fourth once again, clocking a time of 3:22.42 in the final.

== Championship results ==
Representing Canada
Year	Competition	Venue	Position	Event	Time
2019	IAAF World Relays	Yokohama, Japan	2nd	4 × 400 m mixed relay	3:18.15
2019	Universiade	Naples, Italy	10th (sf)	400 m	52.49
2019	Universiade	Naples, Italy	5th	4 × 400 m relay	3:34.62
2022	World Championships	Eugene, Oregon	4th	4 × 400 m relay	3:25.18
2023	World Championships	Budapest, Hungary	4th	4 × 400 m relay	3:22.42
2024	Olympic Games	Paris, France	13th (rep)	400 m	51.43
2024	Olympic Games	Paris, France	6th	4 × 400 m relay	3:22.01
2025	World Relays	Guangzhou, China	7th	4 × 400 m relay	3:27.84
2025	World Championships	Tokyo, Japan	38th (h)	400 m	52.19
2025	World Championships	Tokyo, Japan	13th (h)	4 × 400 m relay	3:26.33
2026	World Indoor Championships	Toruń, Poland	8th	400 m	51.74
