= Kirsten McAslan =

British sprinter

Personal information
- Nationality: British
- Born: 1 September 1993 (age 32) Manchester, England
- Education: University of Bath
- Height: 1.72 m (5 ft 8 in)
- Weight: 60 kg (132 lb)

Sport
- Country: Great Britain
- Sport: Track and field
- Events: 400 m 400 m hurdles 4 x 400 m
- Club: Sale Harriers Manchester
- Coached by: Trevor Painter

Achievements and titles
- Personal bests: 400 m: 52.13 (Tallinn 2015); 600 m: 1:26.22i NB (Manchester 2015); 400 m hurdles: 56.48 (Birmingham 2018)
Medal record
Women's athletics
Representing Great Britain
World Championships
Bronze medal – third place	2015 Beijing	4x400 m
European Indoor Championships
Silver medal – second place	2015 Prague	4x400 m
European U23 Championships
Gold medal – first place	2015 Tallinn	4x400 m
European Junior Championships
Gold medal – first place	2011 Tallinn	4x400 m

Kirsten McAslan (born 1 September 1993) is a British sprinter. She competed in the 4 × 400 metres relay event at the 2015 World Championships in Beijing, China. Her best in the 400 m sprint is 52.13s.

== Personal ==
She is the daughter of Scottish former athletes Ewan McAslan and Fiona Hargreaves. Her father was twice the British Universities triple jump champion. Her mother ran for Scotland at the 1986 Edinburgh Commonwealth Games and was also once the British Student 400m Champion. Kirsten McAslan was the champion of the British Universities and Colleges (BUCS) Championships in 2013. She is also a graduate of biochemistry from the University of Bath.

== Career ==
As a junior, McAslan represented Great Britain at the 2011 European Junior Championships. She finished fourth in her heat. She later anchored the junior quartet to a gold medal in the 4 × 400 m relay three days later.

In 2014, she ran for Scotland in the 4 × 400 m relay at the Glasgow Commonwealth Games. The Scottish team placed fourth in their heat and did not make it to the final of the event.

In 2015, McAslan became the British indoor 400 m champion. She ran the anchor leg for Great Britain in the women's 4 × 400 m relay at the 2015 European U23 Championships. The team consisting of Seren Bundy-Davies, Zoey Clark, Victoria Ohuruogu and McAslan won the gold medal in a national U23 record. McAslan also anchored the British 4 × 400 m quartet that won the silver medal at the 2015 European Athletics Indoor Championships in Prague.

On 4 January 2015, McAslan ran the fastest 600 m by a Scottish athlete in a time of 1:26.22. This was a world lead and personal best for the young athlete. McAslan's time beat the mark of Linsey MacDonald, who ran 1:27.4 in December 1981.
