= Olha Bibik =

Ukrainian sprinter (born 1990)

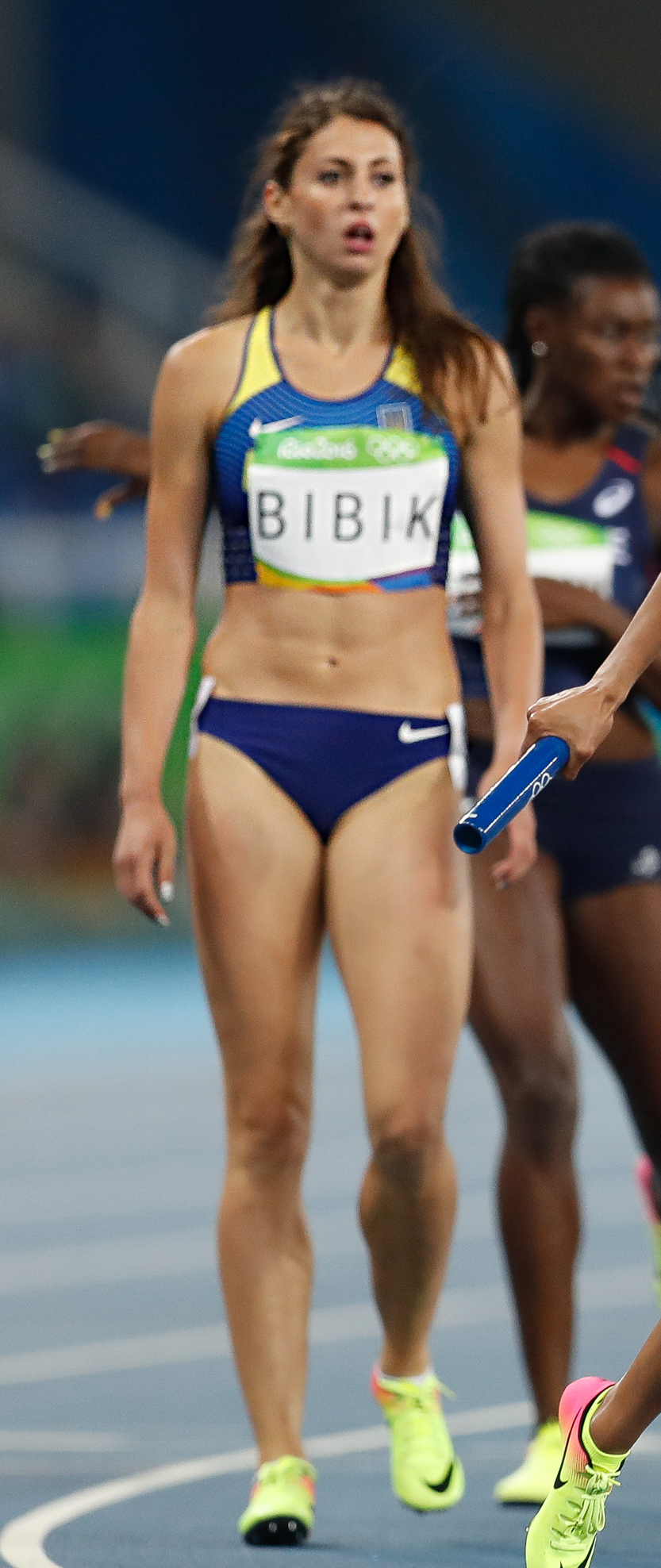
- Bibik at the 2016 Olympic Games

Personal information
- Born: 5 February 1990 (age 36) Dniprodzerzhynsk, Ukrainian SSR, Soviet Union
- Height: 180 cm (5 ft 11 in)
- Weight: 64 kg (141 lb)

Sport
- Sport: Track and field
- Event(s): 400 metres, 800 metres

Achievements and titles
- Personal best(s): 400 m – 51.69 (2016); 800 m – 2:01.53 (2009)
Medal record
Women's athletics
Representing Ukraine
European Team Championships
Bronze medal – third place	2015 Cheboksary	4 x 400 m relay
European Indoor Championships
Bronze medal – third place	2017 Belgrade	4 × 400 m relay

Olha Bibik (Ukrainian: Ольга Бібік; born 5 February 1990) is a Ukrainian sprinter. She represented her country at the 2015 World Championships, 2016 World Indoor Championships, and 2016 Summer Olympics.

== Competition record ==
Year	Competition	Venue	Position	Event	Notes
Representing Ukraine
2007	World Youth Championships	Ostrava, Czech Republic	4th	800 m	2:06.17
2007	European Youth Olympic Festival	Belgrade, Serbia	2nd	800 m	2:07.55
2008	World Junior Championships	Bydgoszcz, Poland	33rd (h)	800 m	2:10.80
2009	European Junior Championships	Novi Sad, Serbia	6th	800 m	2:07.55
2011	European U23 Championships	Ostrava, Czech Republic	14th (h)	800 m	2:08.92
2013	European Indoor Championships	Gothenburg, Sweden	5th	4 × 400 m relay	3:34.61
2015	World Championships	Beijing, China	7th (h)	4 × 400 m relay	3:26.01
2016	World Indoor Championships	Portland, United States	5th	4 × 400 m relay	3:40.42
2016	European Championships	Amsterdam, Netherlands	19th (sf)	400 m	53.02
2016	Olympic Games	Rio de Janeiro, Brazil	29th (h)	400 m	52.33
2016	Olympic Games	Rio de Janeiro, Brazil	5th	4 × 400 m relay	3:26.64
2017	European Indoor Championships	Belgrade, Serbia	13th (sf)	400 m	53.66
2017	European Indoor Championships	Belgrade, Serbia	3rd	4 × 400 m relay	3:32.10
2017	World Championships	London, United Kingdom	12th (h)	4 × 400 m relay	3:31.84
2017	Universiade	Taipei, Taiwan	1st (h)	4 × 400 m relay	3:31.76^{1}

^{1}Disqualified in the final
