= Tovea Jenkins =

Jamaican sprinter

Personal information
- Nationality: Jamaican
- Born: 27 October 1992 (age 33)

Sport
- Sport: Athletics
- Event: Sprinting

Tovea Jenkins (born 27 October 1992) is a Jamaican athlete. She competed in the women's 400 metres at the 2018 IAAF World Indoor Championships.
