= Anna Pałys =

Polish athlete (born 1995)

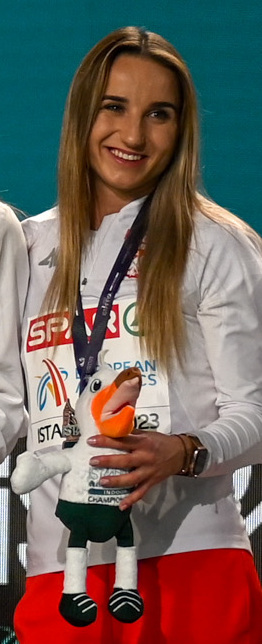

Personal information
- Nationality: Polish
- Born: 2 March 1995 (age 31)

Sport
- Sport: Athletics
- Event: Sprint

Achievements and titles
- Personal best(s): 400m 52.65 (Bydgoszcz, 2024); Indoors; 400m: 53.30 (Toruń, 2023)
Medal record
Women's athletics
Representing Poland
European Indoor Championships
Bronze medal – third place	2023 Istanbul	4x400 m relay

Anna Pałys (born 2 March 1995) is a Polish sprinter.

== Career ==
From Wrocław, she is a member of the Ślęza Wrocław athletics club. She competed at the 2019 Summer Universiade in Naples, and later represented Poland at the 2022 World Athletics Championships in Eugene, Oregon.

She was a bronze medalist in the 4 x 400 metres relay at the 2023 European Athletics Indoor Championships in Istanbul alongside Anna Kielbasinska, Marika Popowicz-Drapala and Alicja Wrona-Kutrzepa in March 2023.

She was selected for the 4x400m relay team for the 2025 World Athletics Indoor Championships in Nanjing in March 2025. She competed at the 2025 World Athletics Relays in China in the Women's 4 × 400 metres relay in May 2025.

== Personal life ==
She is a certified personal trainer.
