= 2015 European Athletics U23 Championships =

- Dates: 8–12 July
- Host city: Tallinn, Estonia
- Level: Under 23
- Type: Outdoor
- Events: 44
- Participation: 934 athletes from 45 nations

The 2015 European Athletics U23 Championships were the 10th edition of the biennial athletics competition between European athletes under the age of twenty-three. It was held in Tallinn, Estonia from 8 to 12 July.

== Medal summary ==
=== Men ===
Event	Gold		Silver		Bronze	
100 metres	Giovanni Galbieri; Italy	10.33	Denis Dimitrov; Bulgaria	10.34	Guy-Elphège Anouman; France	10.39
200 metres	Karol Zalewski; Poland	20.49	Leon Reid; Great Britain	20.63	Jan Jirka; Czech Republic	20.82
400 metres	Thomas Jordier; France	45.50	Pavel Ivashko; Russia	45.73	Luka Janežic; Slovenia	45.73
800 metres	Artur Kuciapski; Poland	1:48.11	Saúl Ordóñez; Spain	1:48.23	Žan Rudolf; Slovenia	1:48.47
1500 metres	Marc Alcalá; Spain	3:44.54	Mohad Abdikadar Sheikh Ali; Italy	3:44.91	Neil Gourley; Great Britain	3:45.04
5000 metres	Ali Kaya; Turkey	13:20.16 CR	Isaac Kimeli; Belgium	13:54.33	Carlos Mayo; Spain	13:55.19
10,000 metres	Ali Kaya; Turkey	27:53.38 CR	Mikhail Strelkov; Russia	28:53.94	Yassine Rachik; Italy	28:53.95
110 metres hurdles	David Omoregie; Great Britain	13.63	Javier Colomo; Spain	13.73	Lorenzo Perini; Italy	13.86
400 metres hurdles	Patryk Dobek; Poland	48.84	Jussi Kanervo; Finland	49.66	Nicolai Hartling; Denmark	50.02
3000 metres steeplechase	Mitko Tsenov; Bulgaria	8:37.79	Viktor Bakharev; Russia	8:40.75	Osama Zoghlami; Italy	8:42.00
4 × 100 metres relay	France; Guy-Elphège Anouman; Mickaël-Meba Zézé; Ken Romain; Stuart Dutamby; Pierre Chalus*	39.36	Czech Republic; Marcel Kadlec; Michal Desenský; Jan Jirka; Zdeněk Stromšík	39.38	Russia; Aleksandr Yeliseyev; Dmitriy Sychev; Denis Ogarkov; Kirill Chernukhin	39.46
4 × 400 metres relay	France; Ludvy Vaillant; Alexandre Divet; Nicolas Courbière; Thomas Jordier	3:04.92	Poland; Kajetan Duszyński; Patryk Dobek; Bartłomiej Chojnowski; Karol Zalewski	3:05.35	Germany; Jakob Krempin; Alexander Gladitz; Torben Junker; Marc Koch	3:05.97
20 kilometres walk	Nikolay Markov; Russia	1:23:49	Álvaro Martín; Spain	1:24:51	Pavel Parshin; Russia	1:25:56
High jump	Ilya Ivanyuk; Russia	2.30	Dmitriy Kroyter; Israel	2.24	Eugenio Meloni; Italy; Chris Kandu; Great Britain	2.21
Pole vault	Robert Renner; Slovenia	5.55	Leonid Kobelev; Russia	5.55	Adrián Vallés; Spain	5.50
Long jump	Fabian Heinle; Germany	8.14	Radek Juška; Czech Republic	8.00	Bachana Khorava; Georgia	7.97
Triple jump	Dmitriy Chizhikov; Russia	17.05	Georgi Tsonov; Bulgaria	16.77	Ilya Potaptsev; Russia	16.46
Shot put	Filip Mihaljević; Croatia	19.35	Bob Bertemes; Luxembourg	19.29	Andrzej Regin; Poland	19.08
Discus throw	Alin Firfirică; Romania	60.64	Wojciech Praczyk; Poland	58.96	Róbert Szikszai; Hungary	58.82
Hammer throw	Nick Miller; Great Britain	74.46	Valeriy Pronkin; Russia	74.29	Bence Pásztor; Hungary	74.06
Javelin throw	Kacper Oleszczuk; Poland	82.29	Maksym Bohdan; Ukraine	81.08	Bernhard Seifert; Germany	80.57
Decathlon	Pieter Braun; Netherlands	8195	Jorge Ureña; Spain	7983	Janek Õiglane; Estonia	7945

=== Women ===
Event	Gold		Silver		Bronze	
100 metres	Rebekka Haase; Germany	11.47	Alexandra Burghardt; Germany	11.54	Stella Akakpo; France	11.55
200 metres	Rebekka Haase; Germany	23.16	Anna-Lena Freese; Germany	23.22	Brigitte Ntiamoah; France	23.49
400 metres	Bianca Răzor; Romania	51.31	Yekaterina Renzhina; Russia	51.51	Patrycja Wyciszkiewicz; Poland	51.63
800 metres	Rénelle Lamote; France	2:00.19	Anastasiya Tkachuk; Ukraine	2:00.43	Christina Hering; Germany	2:00.88
1500 metres	Amela Terzić; Serbia	4:04.77 CR, NR	Sofia Ennaoui; Poland	4:04.90	Nataliya Pryshchepa; Ukraine	4:06.29
5000 metres	Liv Westphal; France	15:30.61	Louise Carton; Belgium	15:32.75	Viktoriya Kalyuzhna; Ukraine	15:38.38
10,000 metres	Jip Vastenburg; Netherlands	32:18.69	Rhona Auckland; Great Britain	32:22.79	Alice Wright; Great Britain	32:46.57
100 metres hurdles	Noemi Zbären; Switzerland	12.71	Karolina Kołeczek; Poland	12.92	Nadine Visser; Netherlands	13.01
400 metres hurdles	Elise Malmberg; Sweden	55.88	Stina Troest; Denmark	56.01	Aurélie Chaboudez; France	56.04
3000 metres steeplechase	Tuğba Güvenç; Turkey	9:36.14	Maeva Danois; France	9:40.89	Emma Oudiou; France	9:44.74
4 × 100 metres relay	Germany; Amelie-Sophie Lederer; Alexandra Burghardt; Rebekka Haase; Anna-Lena Freese	43:47	Italy; Martina Favaretto; Irene Siragusa; Anna Bongiorni; Johanelis Herrera Abreu	44:06	Switzerland; Lena Weiss; Sarah Atcho; Charlène Keller; Noemi Zbären	44:24
4 × 400 metres relay	Great Britain; Seren Bundy-Davies; Zoey Clark; Victoria Ohuruogu; Kirsten McAslan	3:30:07	Poland; Małgorzata Curyło; Martyna Dąbrowska; Adrianna Janowicz; Patrycja Wyciszkiewicz	3:30:24	Russia; Yana Glotova; Yuliya Spiridonova; Tatyana Zotova; Yekaterina Renzhina	3:30:78
20 kilometres walk	Mariya Ponomaryova; Russia	1:27:17	Anezka Drahotova; Czech Republic	1:27:25	Lyudmyla Olyanovska; Ukraine	1:28:41
High jump	Alessia Trost; Italy	1.90	Nafissatou Thiam; Belgium	1.87	Iryna Heraschenko; Ukraine	1.87
Pole vault	Angelica Bengtsson; Sweden	4.55	Michaela Meijer; Sweden	4.50	Natalya Demidenko; Russia	4.35
Long jump	Malaika Mihambo; Germany	6.73	Jazmin Sawyers; Great Britain	6.71	Alina Rotaru; Romania	6.69
Triple jump	Dovilė Dzindzaletaitė; Lithuania	14.23	Elena Andreea Panțuroiu; Romania	14.13	Tetyana Ptashkina; Ukraine	14.05
Shot put	Viktoriya Kolb; Belarus	17.47	Shanice Craft; Germany	17.29	Sara Gambetta; Germany	16.99
Discus throw	Shanice Craft; Germany	63.83	Anna Rüh; Germany	61.27	Kristin Pudenz; Germany	59.94
Hammer throw	Alexandra Tavernier; France	72.50	Alena Sobaleva; Belarus	71.20	Malwina Kopron; Poland	68.57
Javelin throw	Christin Hussong; Germany	65.60	Kateryna Derun; Ukraine	58.60	Liveta Jasiūnaitė; Lithuania	55.77
Heptathlon	Xénia Krizsán; Hungary	6303	Lyubov Tkach; Russia	6055	Ivona Dadic; Austria	6033

== Medal table ==
Host nation

Rank	Nation	Gold	Silver	Bronze	Total
1	Germany (GER)	7	4	5	16
2	France (FRA)	6	1	5	12
3	Russia (RUS)	4	7	5	16
4	Poland (POL)	4	5	3	12
5	Great Britain (GBR)	3	3	3	9
6	Turkey (TUR)	3	0	0	3
7	Italy (ITA)	2	2	4	8
8	Romania (ROU)	2	1	1	4
9	Sweden (SWE)	2	1	0	3
10	Netherlands (NED)	2	0	1	3
11	Spain (ESP)	1	4	2	7
12	Bulgaria (BUL)	1	2	0	3
13	Belarus (BLR)	1	1	0	2
14	Hungary (HUN)	1	0	2	3
15	Lithuania (LTU)	1	0	1	2
15	Slovenia (SLO)	1	0	1	2
15	Switzerland (SUI)	1	0	1	2
18	Croatia (CRO)	1	0	0	1
18	Serbia (SRB)	1	0	0	1
20	Ukraine (UKR)	0	3	5	8
21	Czech Republic (CZE)	0	3	1	4
22	Belgium (BEL)	0	3	0	3
23	Denmark (DEN)	0	1	1	2
24	Finland (FIN)	0	1	0	1
24	Israel (ISR)	0	1	0	1
24	Luxembourg (LUX)	0	1	0	1
27	Austria (AUT)	0	0	1	1
27	Estonia (EST)*	0	0	1	1
27	Georgia (GEO)	0	0	1	1
Totals (29 entries)		44	44	44	132

== Participation ==
According to an unofficial count, 934 athletes from 45 countries participated in the event.

- Armenia (1)
- Austria (6)
- Azerbaijan (3)
- Belarus (23)
- Belgium (25)
- Bosnia and Herzegovina (3)
- Bulgaria (8)
- Croatia (10)
- Cyprus (8)
- Czech Republic (32)
- Denmark (4)
- Estonia (17)
- Finland (38)
- France (51)
- Georgia (7)
- Germany (69)
- Greece (11)
- Hungary (27)
- Iceland (4)
- Ireland (14)
- Israel (15)
- Italy (73)
- Latvia (15)
- Lithuania (20)
- Luxembourg (5)
- Macedonia (1)
- Malta (1)
- Moldova (2)
- Montenegro (2)
- Netherlands (32)
- Norway (25)
- Poland (56)
- Portugal (22)
- Romania (32)
- Russia (58)
- San Marino (1)
- Serbia (8)
- Slovakia (6)
- Slovenia (12)
- Spain (41)
- Sweden (38)
- Switzerland (17)
- Turkey (18)
- Ukraine (37)
- United Kingdom (36)
