= Brigitte Ntiamoah =

French sprinter

Personal information
- Born: 5 March 1994 (age 32) Mulhouse, France
- Height: 172 cm (5 ft 8 in)
- Weight: 67 kg (148 lb)

Sport
- Country: France
- Sport: Athletics
- Event: Sprints
- Club: Entente Grand Mulhouse Athle
- Coached by: Bruno Gajer
Medal record
European Championships
Silver medal – second place	2016 Amsterdam	4x400 m relay

Brigitte Ntiamoah (born 5 March 1994 in Mulhouse) is a French athlete, who specialises in sprinting.

== Biography ==
Running for team l'Entente Grand Mulhouse Athle, Brigitte was champion for cadettes in the 400m in 2011 and junior champion of France for the 200 m in 2012 (outdoor and indoor). In 2013, during the European Junior Championships at RietiIt, she took fifth in the 200m and won the silver medal in the 4 × 100m Relay. She became the Under 21 champion of France in the 200m in 2014.

Early in the 2015 season, Brigitte Ntiamoah won the 200m at the Indoor French championships at Aubière, with a time of 23.57s. In July 2015, she won the bronze medal at the Under 21 European Championships at Tallinn.

Ntiamoah competed for France at the 2016 Summer Olympics.

Her elder brother Edmond was professional footballer and is now the logistics manager for the large confectionery firm Bachmann in Switzerland.

== Prize list ==
=== International ===
International Awards
Date	Competition	Location	Result	Event	Performance
2013	European Junior Championships	Rieti	2nd	4 × 100 m	44.00
2015	European U23 Championships	Tallinn	3rd	200 m	23.49
2017	IAAF World Relays	Nassau, Bahamas	8th	4 × 400 m	3:35.03

=== National ===
- French Championships in Athletics :
  - 3rd in the 200m in 2014
- Indoor French Athletics Championships :
  - winner of the 200 m in 2015 3rd in 2014

== Records ==
personal records
Event	Performance	Location	Date
200 m	23.47s	Geneva	6 June 2015
