= Seren Bundy-Davies =

Welsh sprinter (born 1994)

Personal information
- Nationality: Welsh
- Born: 30 December 1994 (age 31) Manchester, Greater Manchester, England
- Height: 1.75 m (5 ft 9 in)
- Weight: 63 kg (139 lb)

Sport
- Country: Great Britain
- University team: University of Manchester
- Club: Trafford Athletic Club
- Coached by: Steve Ball

Achievements and titles
- World finals: 2015 – 3rd
- Personal best: 400 m 51.26
Medal record
Women's athletics
Representing Great Britain
World Championships
Bronze medal – third place	2015 Beijing	4 × 400 m relay
European Championships
Gold medal – first place	2016 Amsterdam	4 × 400 m
European Indoor Championships
Silver medal – second place	2015 Prague	4 × 400 m relay
Bronze medal – third place	2015 Prague	400 m
- Updated on 31 August 2015

Seren Bundy-Davies (born 30 December 1994) is a Welsh track and field sprinter who competes in the 400 metres for Great Britain. She came to international prominence at the 2015 European Athletics Indoor Championships, winning bronze in the 400 metres and silver in the 4 × 400 metres relay. She won a bronze medal in the 4 × 400 m relay at the 2015 World Championships in Athletics.

== Career ==
=== Early years and breakthrough ===
Born to Welsh parents in Greater Manchester, she grew up in the city and was educated at Wilmslow High School. After playing numerous sports in school, she was picked out at age 17 by coach Steve Ball of Trafford Athletic Club, after finishing 4th over 400 m at English School's Championships.

Joining Trafford Athletic Club and coached by Ball, she now competes for TAC and the University of Manchester, where under a sports scholarship she is studying for a biomedical science degree. She broke through at the national level in 2014, placing fourth at the British Athletics Championships. She was the Welsh senior champion that year and improved her personal best to 52.50 seconds to become the Welsh record holder.

=== 2015 season ===
At the Birmingham Indoor Grand Prix at the start of 2015, she ran a personal best of 51.72 seconds to win the race. This run took Bundy-Davies top of the European Indoor rankings, and despite a fall in the British Athletics Indoor Championships, she was selected to represent Great Britain for the first time at the 2015 European Athletics Indoor Championships. There she won a bronze in the 400 metres, and a silver in 4 × 400 metres relay teamed with Laura Maddox, Kirsten McAslan and Kelly Massey.

In her first outdoor race of the 2015 season at Nivelles, Belgium in June, she lowered her personal best to 51.72secs. She then choose to compete at the 2015 European Athletics U23 Championships in Tallinn, Estonia, finishing fourth in the individual 400 m, and being part of the Great Britain and Northern Ireland team that claimed gold in the 4 × 400 m relay. She then ran a personal best at the London Anniversary Games in July with 51.48 in the 400 m, coming in seventh. However, although these performances gained her selection for the GB relay team at the 2015 World Championships in Athletics in Beijing, China, under UK Athletics policy due to competing in an international Under23 competition she was made ineligible for individual 400 m selection, despite meeting the required standard.
