= Derya Yıldırım =

German singer-song writer

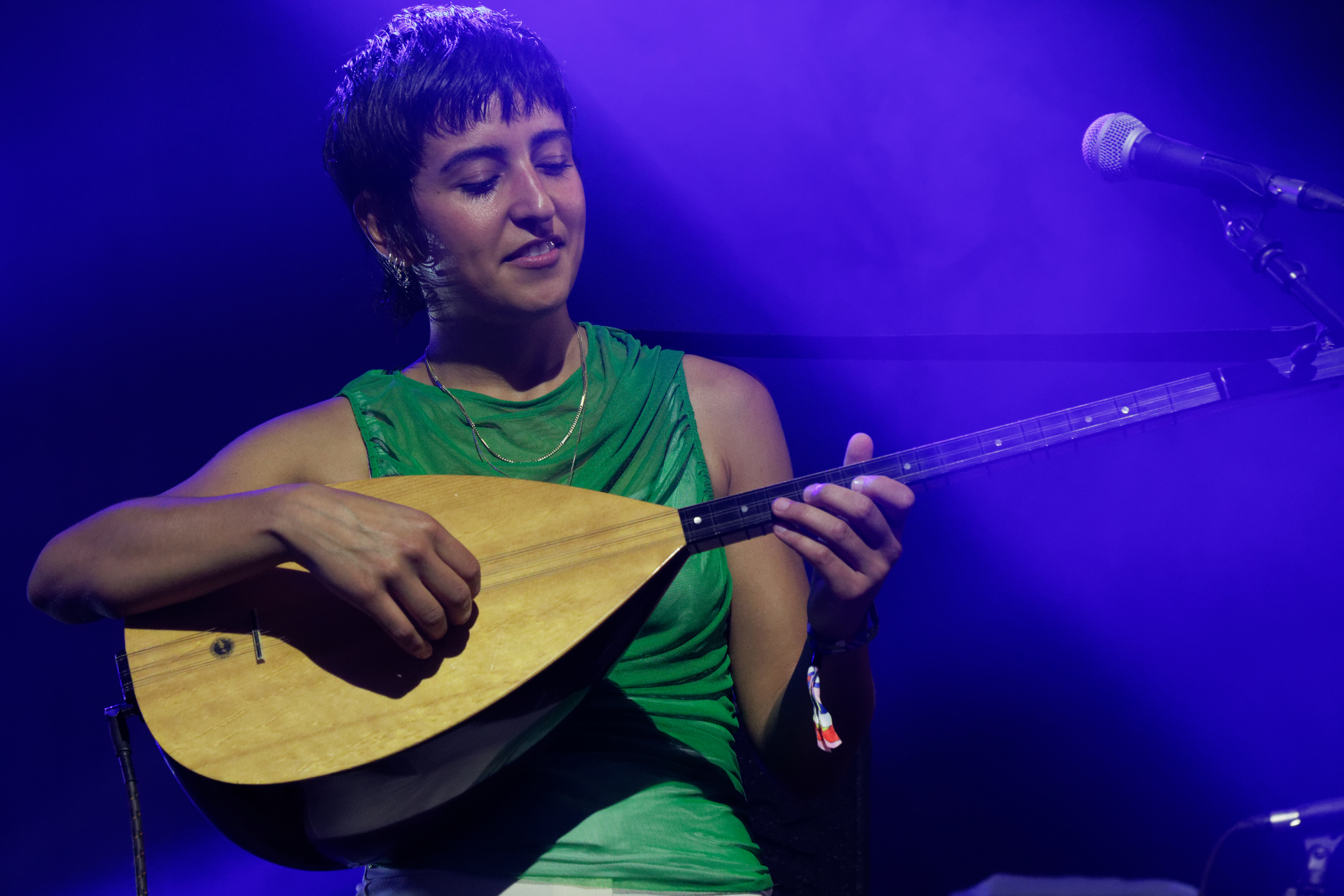
Derya Yıldırım with bağlama (2022)

Derya Yıldırım (1993 in Hamburg) is a German singer-songwriter, composer and music producer. The multi-instrumentalist is particularly associated with the bağlama. Yıldırım sings in the Turkish language and musically draws on Anatolian folk and pop music. She performs together with the band Grup Şimşek or solo, and also works as a lecturer and jury member.

== Biography ==
Derya Yıldırım was born in 1993 in Hamburg and grew up in Veddel. She attended music school and learned piano, guitar, oud, bağlama and saxophone. She also sang in a choir. From 2013 to 2016 she studied at the Hochschule für Musik und Theater Hamburg. From 2016 she studied music education at the Universität der Künste in Berlin. She was the only student in Germany with bağlama as her principal instrument, an instrument that has a special tradition among the minority of Alevis native to eastern Anatolia. Yıldırım's teacher was Taner Akyol. At the beginning of her musical career, Yıldırım performed classical Anatolian music together with her cousin Duygu Ağal.
