= Margo Van Puyvelde =

Belgian hurdler and sprinter (born 1995)

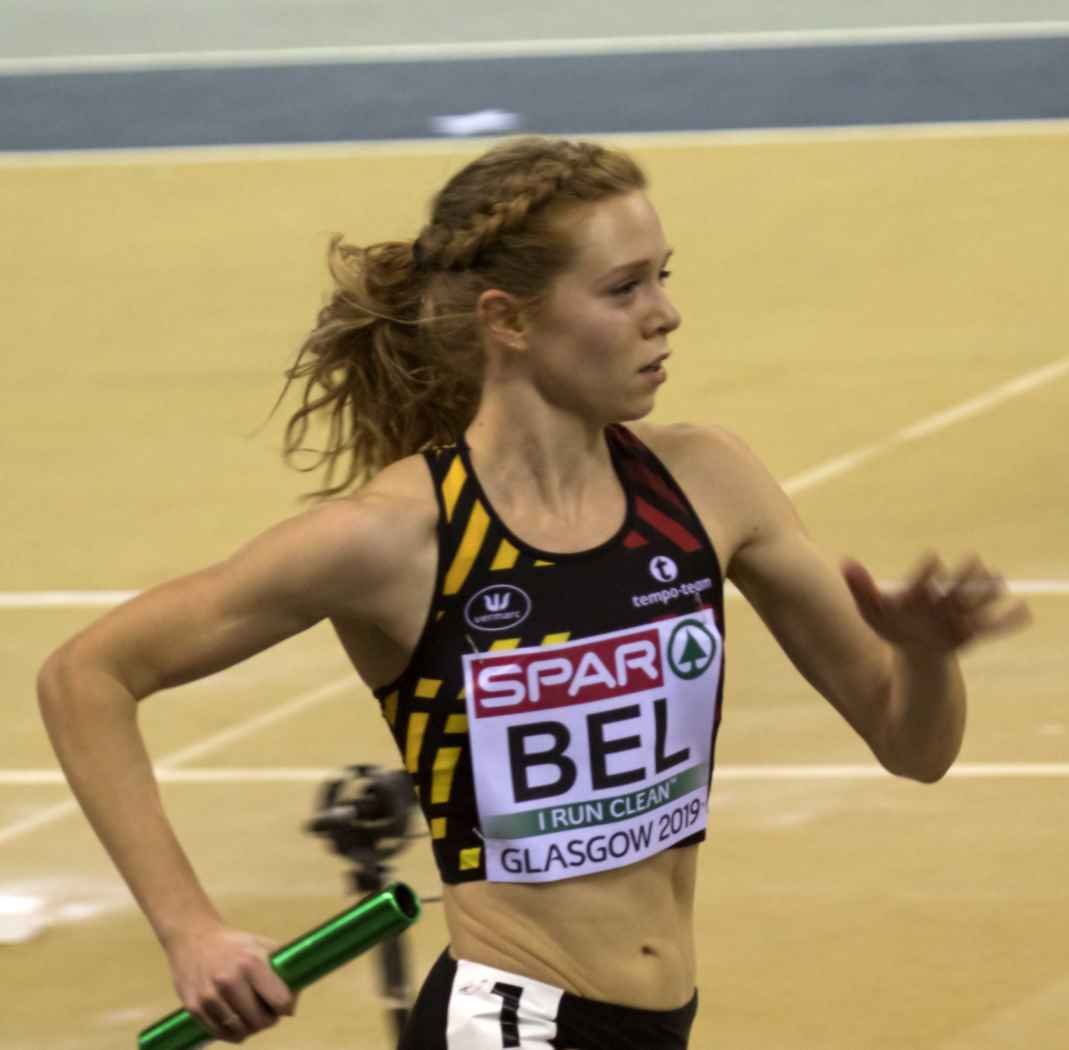
- Van Puyvelde at the 2019 European Athletics Indoor Championships

Personal information
- Born: 21 December 1995 (age 29)

Sport
- Country: Belgium
- Sport: Track and field
- Event(s): 400 metres 400 metres hurdles
- Club: ASV Oudenaarde; Belgian Cheetahs

Margo Van Puyvelde (born 21 December 1995) is a Belgian hurdler and sprinter who competes in international elite events. Her highest achievement is achieving fifth place at the 2019 European Athletics Indoor Championships in Glasgow in the 4 x 400 metre relay and is a national record holder in this event.
