= Gabriella O'Grady =

Australian sprinter

Personal information
- Nationality: Australian
- Born: 18 February 1997 (age 29)

Sport
- Sport: Athletics
- Event: Sprinting

Gabriella O'Grady (born 18 February 1997) is an Australian athlete. She competed in the women's 400 metres event at the 2019 World Athletics Championships. She did not advance to compete in the semi-finals.
