= Ekaterina Renzhina =

Russian sprinter

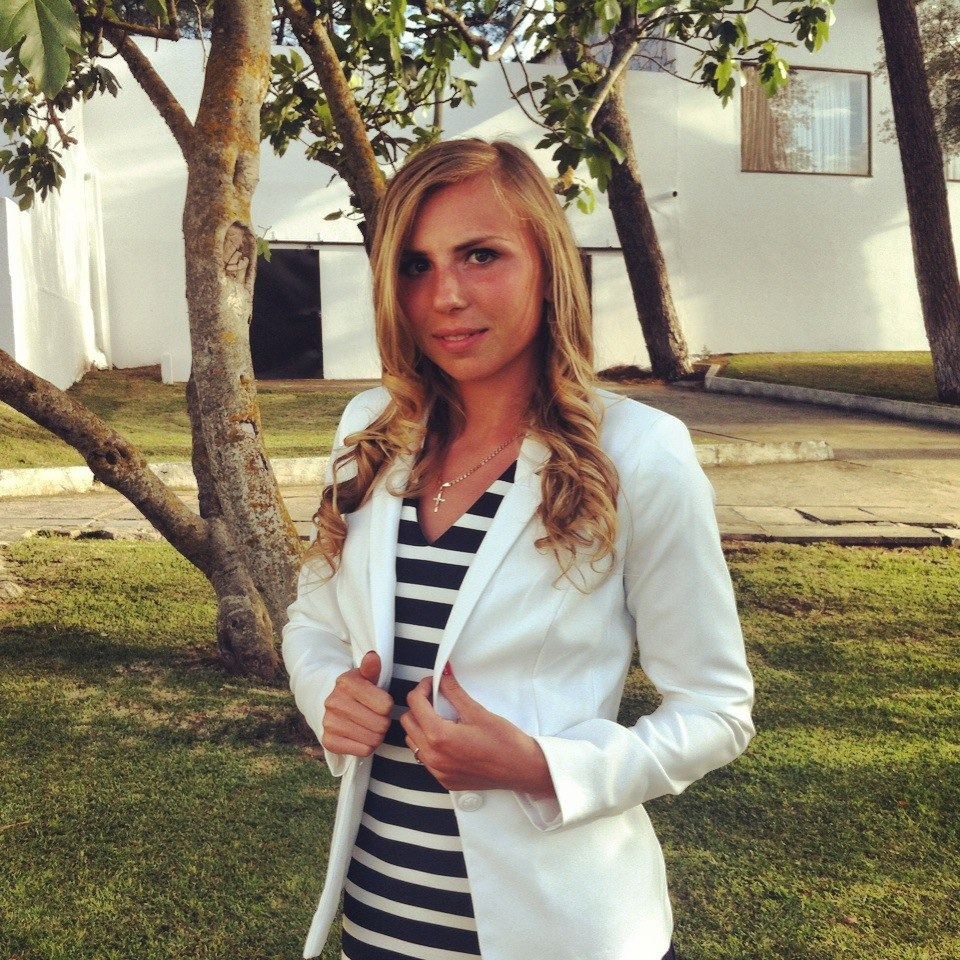
- Ekaterina Renzhina in 2014

Personal information
- Born: 18 October 1994 (age 31)

Sport
- Country: Russia
- Sport: Track and field
- Event: 400 metres

Ekaterina Renzhina (born 18 October 1994) is a Russian sprinter. She competed in the 400 metres event at the 2015 World Championships in Athletics in Beijing, China.
