= Kateryna Karpiuk =

Ukrainian sprinter (born 1995)

Personal information
- Nationality: Ukrainian
- Born: 2 June 1995 (age 31) Rivne, Ukraine

Sport
- Sport: Sprinting
- Event: 4 × 400 metres
Medal record
Women's athletics
Representing Ukraine
European Team Championships
Silver medal – second place	2017 Lille	4x400 m relay
Military World Games
Bronze medal – third place	2019 Wuhan	4×400 m relay
Summer Universiade
Gold medal – first place	2019 Naples	4×400 m relay

Kateryna Volodymyrivna Karpiuk (née Kateryna Klymiuk; Ukrainian: Катерина Володимирівна Карпюк; born 2 June 1995) is a Ukrainian sprinter.

== Career ==
She competed in the women's 4 × 400 metres relay at the 2017 World Championships in Athletics. She also competed in the mixed 4 × 400 metres relay event at the 2020 Summer Olympics.
