= South Sudan at the 2015 World Championships in Athletics =

- WA code: SSD

in Beijing
- Competitors: 0
- Medals: Gold 0 Silver 0 Bronze 0 Total 0

World Championships in Athletics appearances
- 2017; 2019; 2022; 2023

South Sudan was set to compete at the 2015 World Championships in Athletics in Beijing, China, from 22 to 30 August 2015. However, their only athlete did not show up in Beijing.

== Results ==
(q – qualified, NM – no mark, SB – season best)

=== Men ===
Track and road events

Athlete	Event	Heat		Semifinal		Final	
Athlete	Event	Result	Rank	Result	Rank	Result	Rank
Guor Marial	Marathon	—				DNS	
