= Jessica Gulli-Nance =

Australian athlete

Personal information
- Born: 19 March 1988 (age 38) Geelong, Australia

Sport
- Sport: Athletics
- Event(s): 400 m, 400 m hurdles

Jessica Gulli-Nance (born 19 March 1988) is an Australian athlete specialising in the 400 metres and 400 metres hurdles. She competed in the 4 × 400 metres relay event at the 2015 World Championships in Beijing without qualifying for the final. Her personal bests are 53.22 seconds in the 400 metres (Melbourne 2015) and 57.30 seconds in the 400 metres hurdles (Melbourne 2014).

Having been plagued by injuries earlier in her career, in 2020 Nance was free from injuries and running her best times in five years. However, the postponement of the 2020 Olympics cost Nance as she had to wait an additional year to compete at the sport's highest level.

== International competitions ==
Year	Competition	Venue	Position	Event	Notes
Representing Australia
2005	World Youth Championships	Marrakesh, Morocco	35th (h)	100 m	12.11
2005	World Youth Championships	Marrakesh, Morocco	7th	100 m hurdles (76.2 cm)	13.85
2005	World Youth Championships	Marrakesh, Morocco	–	Medley relay	2:06.58
2006	World Junior Championships	Beijing, China	–	4 × 100 m relay	DNF
2014	IAAF World Relays	Nassau, Bahamas	1st (B)	4 × 400 m relay	3:31.01
2014	Commonwealth Games	Glasgow, United Kingdom	6th (h)	4 × 400 m relay	3:32.40
2015	IAAF World Relays	Nassau, Bahamas	7th	4 × 400 m relay	3:30.03
2015	World Championships	Beijing, China	12th (h)	4 × 400 m relay	3:28.61
