= 2015 World Championships in Athletics – Men's masters 800 metres =

Men's Masters 800 metres at the 2015 World Championships
- Venue: Beijing National Stadium
- Dates: 29 August (final)
- Competitors: 9 from 8 nations
- Winning time: 2:00.92

Medalists
gold medal	David Heath	Great Britain
silver medal	Gunnar Rune Durén	Sweden
bronze medal	Michael Sherar	Canada

The men's masters 800 metres at the 2015 World Championships in Athletics was a special demonstration event held at the Beijing National Stadium on 29 August.

From the gun WMA M55 Champion Anselm Lebourne, the oldest athlete in the field, seemed to go out slightly faster than everybody else, but a last moment burst at the break line put home town favorite Chunsheng Wang into the early lead. By the end of the straightaway, he was overtaken by new M50 1500 metres world record holder David Heath. Through the turn Michael Sherar was able to work his way around Wang and Lebourne tried to follow, but tripped and spent several strides trying to regain his balance. Wang entered the home stretch a bit wide giving Lebourne an opening to squeeze through. Heath hit the bell at 59.73 two seconds up, with Lebourne just passing Sherar to take over second place. 1988 Olympian Paul Osland led the rest of the field past Wang along the back stretch while Lebourne separated from pack now more than 20 metres behind Heath who hit 600 metres at 1:28.57. Onto the home stretch, Heath looked powerful way ahead of the field. Lebourne began to struggle, ten metres out from the finish line, Gunnar Rune Durén went by, then Sherar dipped by a step before the finish line for bronze.

Lebourne's time of 2:03.75 fully automatic time is technically better than Stan Immelmann's hand timed 2:03.7 M55 world record from January 2001. Lebrun ran 2:02.16, a significantly faster time, indoors in February. As of December 2015, WMA has not ratified Lebourne for the world record, USATF ratified his 2:04.79 performance in Lyon as the American record.

== Schedule ==
Date	Time	Round
29 August 2015	17:50	Final

All times are local times (UTC+8)

== Results ==
Rank	Lane	Bib	Name (division)	Nationality	Time	Notes
1st place, gold medalist(s)	7	1106	David Heath M50	Great Britain & N.I.	2:00.92	
2nd place, silver medalist(s)	6	1101	Gunnar Rune Durén M50	Sweden	2:03.41	
3rd place, bronze medalist(s)	9	1102	Michael Sherar M50	Canada	2:03.61	
4	5	1107	Anselm Lebourne M55	United States	2:03.75	
5	8	1110	Benoït Zavattero M55	France	2:04.47	
6	3	1105	Peter Oberliessen M50	Germany	2:05.08	
7	8	1108	Allan Francis Cook M50	Australia	2:05.59	
8	2	1104	Giuseppe Romeo M50	Italy	2:07.32	
9	1	1109	Chunsheng Wang M50	China	2:08.78	
10	4	1103	Paul George Osland M50	Canada	2:10.60	
