= 2015 World Championships in Athletics – Women's 4 × 400 metres relay =

Women's 4 × 400 metres relay at the 2015 World Championships
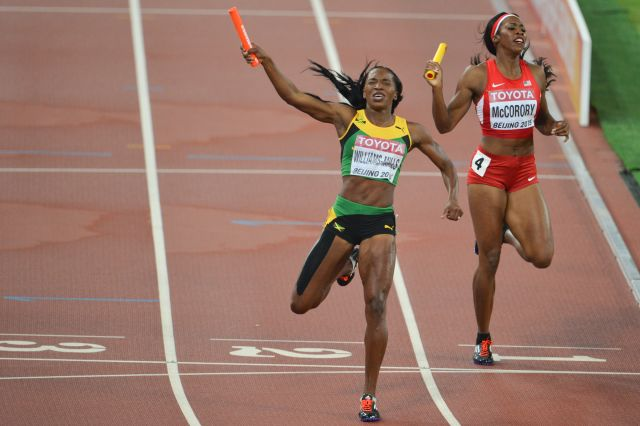
- The finish, Novlene Williams-Mills celebrates ahead of Francena McCorory
- Venue: Beijing National Stadium
- Dates: 29 August (heats); 30 August (final)
- Competitors: 74 from 16 nations
- Winning time: 3:19.13

Medalists
gold medal	Christine Day; Shericka Jackson; Stephenie Ann McPherson; Novlene Williams-Mills; Anastasia Le-Roy*; Chrisann Gordon*	Jamaica
silver medal	Sanya Richards-Ross; Natasha Hastings; Allyson Felix; Francena McCorory; Phyllis Francis*; Jessica Beard*	United States
bronze medal	Christine Ohuruogu; Anyika Onuora; Eilidh Child; Seren Bundy-Davies; Kirsten McAslan*	Great Britain

Video on YouTube Official Video

The women's 4 × 400 metres relay at the 2015 World Championships in Athletics was held at the Beijing National Stadium on 29 and 30 August.

== Summary ==
The Jamaican team announced their intention to win this race early in the championships by placing all four of their relay team members in the top six of the final of the 400 metres. The American squad had two women in that same race, one of them the winner Allyson Felix. Their ace in the hole was having the top two in the world, prior to the American championships, fail to make the individual event but were available for the relay. Both Olympic Champion Sanya Richards-Ross and World Indoor Champion Francena McCorory demonstrated their occasional ability to run excellent 350 meter races in that meet, their flailing last 50 metres is why they didn't qualify for the individual race. All the other teams ran their season best just to make the finals, Bahamas and Japan set National Records and still failed to qualify.

In the final, it was a reminder of 2008 on this same track as Richards-Ross was out aggressively, making up the stagger on Christine Ohuruogu and when she hit the home stretch, she was out of gas. Meanwhile, to their outside, Christine Day was running smoothly to give Jamaica a big lead, Shericka Jackson. Natasha Hastings ran a quick turn to barely hold off Anyika Onuora at the break. Jackson started her leg conservatively, so the gap looked manageable, until she started cranking and the lead gap started growing. Jamaica had an almost two second lead when Jackson handed off to Stephenie Ann McPherson, Hastings helped the USA hold off the British team before handing off to the American's star, Felix. The gap looked impossible at the beginning but Felix closed it down. It took Felix 350 metres to catch McPherson, but it was a steady race throughout and when Felix got there she just continued on by, handing off to world #3 Francena McCorory with the lead. Jamaica had Novlene Williams-Mills on the anchor leg, starting 2 metres down. Down the backstretch and into the final turn, McCorory held the same gap on Williams-Mills, then through the turn the gap started to widen. Onto the home stretch, Williams-Mills moved out to lane 2 to look for running room. 70 metres before the finish, McCorory's arm movement got bigger but her legs got noticeably slower. Williams-Mills cruised on by a helpless McCorory with powerful sprint form across the line for gold. Well behind the leaders, the British team was challenged by Nigeria until Patience Okon George met with a similar collapse. While Seren Bundy-Davies carried the British home for bronze, George was overtaken at the line by Russia's Kseniya Aksyonova.

Felix's leg was timed at 47.72 seconds, the fastest of her career and the third fastest women's relay leg ever measured, just .02 seconds off the fastest measured electronically.

== Records ==
Prior to the competition, the records were as follows:

World record	Soviet Union (Tatyana Ledovskaya, Olga Nazarova, Mariya Kulchunova, Olga Bryzgina)	3:15.17	Seoul, South Korea	1 October 1988
Championship record	United States (Gwen Torrence, Maicel Malone-Wallace, Natasha Kaiser-Brown, Jearl Miles Clark)	3:16.71	Stuttgart, Germany	22 August 1993
World leading	United States (Phyllis Francis, Natasha Hastings, Sanya Richards-Ross, Francena McCorory	3:19.39	Nassau, Bahamas	3 May 2015
African record	Nigeria (Olabisi Afolabi, Fatima Yusuf, Charity Opara, Falilat Ogunkoya)	3:21.04	Atlanta, United States	3 August 1996
Asian record	China Hebei province (An Xiaohong, Bai Xiaoyun, Cao Chunying, Ma Yuqin)	3:24.28	Beijing, China	13 September 1993
North, Central American and Caribbean record	United States (Denean Howard-Hill, Diane Dixon, Valerie Brisco-Hooks, Florence Griffith Joyner)	3:15.51	Seoul, South Korea	1 October 1988
South American record	Brazil BM&F Bovespa (Geisa Aparecida Coutinho, Bárbara de Oliveira, Joelma Sousa, Jailma de Lima)	3:26.68	São Paulo, Brazil	7 August 2011
European record	Soviet Union (Tatyana Ledovskaya, Olga Nazarova, Mariya Kulchunova, Olga Bryzgina)	3:15.17	Seoul, South Korea	1 October 1988
Oceanian record	Australia (Nova Peris, Tamsyn Manou, Melinda Gainsford-Taylor, Cathy Freeman)	3:23.81	Sydney, Australia	30 September 2000
The following records were established during the competition:
World Leading	Jamaica (Christine Day, Shericka Jackson, Stephenie Ann McPherson, Novlene Williams-Mills)	3:19.13	Beijing, China	30 August 2015

== Qualification standards ==
Entry standards
Top 8 at IWR+ 8 from Top Lists

== Schedule ==
Date	Time	Round
29 August 2015	10:15	Heats
30 August 2015	20:05	Final

All times are local times (UTC+8)

== Results ==
=== Heats ===
Qualification: First 2 of each heat (Q) plus the 2 fastest times (q) advance to the final.

Rank	Heat	Lane	Nation	Athletes	Time	Notes
1	2	4	United States	Phyllis Francis, Jessica Beard, Sanya Richards-Ross, Francena McCorory	3:23.05	Q
2	1	8	Nigeria	Regina George, Funke Oladoye, Tosin Adeloye, Patience Okon George	3:23.27	Q, SB
3	1	4	Jamaica	Anastasia Le-Roy, Shericka Jackson, Chrisann Gordon, Christine Day	3:23.62	Q
4	1	2	Russia	Mariya Mikhailyuk, Ksenia Zadorina, Ekaterina Renzhina, Kseniya Aksyonova	3:23.75	Q, SB
5	2	9	Great Britain & N.I.	Eilidh Child, Anyika Onuora, Kirsten McAslan, Seren Bundy-Davies	3:23.90	Q, SB
6	2	3	France	Estelle Perrossier, Marie Gayot, Agnès Raharolahy, Floria Gueï	3:24.86	Q, SB
7	2	2	Ukraine	Yuliya Olishevska, Olha Bibik, Olha Zemlyak, Olha Lyakhova	3:26.01	q, SB
8	1	3	Canada	Carline Muir, Aiyanna Stiverne, Sage Watson, Nicole Sassine	3:26.14	q, SB
9	2	7	Italy	Maria Benedicta Chigbolu, Elena Maria Bonfanti, Ayomide Folorunso, Chiara Bazzoni	3:27.07	SB
10	2	8	Bahamas	Lanece Clarke, Christine Amertil, Katrina Seymour, Shaunae Miller	3:28.46	NR
11	1	7	Romania	Andreea Grecu, Anamaria Ioniță, Sanda Belgyan, Bianca Răzor	3:28.60	SB
12	1	6	Australia	Anneliese Rubie, Jessica Gulli, Lauren Wells, Morgan Mitchell	3:28.61	SB
13	2	6	Japan	Seika Aoyama, Kana Ichikawa, Asami Chiba, Sayaka Aoki	3:28.91	NR
14	2	5	India	Jisna Mathew, Tintu Lukka, Debasree Majumdar, M. R. Poovamma	3:29.08	SB
15	1	9	Poland	Małgorzata Hołub, Patrycja Wyciszkiewicz, Joanna Linkiewicz, Justyna Święty	3:32.83	
16	1	5	China	Huang Guifen, Wang Huan, Li Xue, Cheng Chong	3:34.98	

=== Final ===
The final was held at 20:05

Rank	Lane	Nation	Athletes	Time	Notes
1st place, gold medalist(s)	6	Jamaica	Christine Day, Shericka Jackson, Stephenie Ann McPherson, Novlene Williams-Mills	3:19.13	WL
2nd place, silver medalist(s)	4	United States	Sanya Richards-Ross, Natasha Hastings, Allyson Felix, Francena McCorory	3:19.44	
3rd place, bronze medalist(s)	5	Great Britain & N.I.	Christine Ohuruogu, Anyika Onuora, Eilidh Child, Seren Bundy-Davies	3:23.62	SB
4	8	Russia	Nadezhda Kotlyarova, Ksenia Zadorina, Kseniya Ryzhova, Kseniya Aksyonova	3:24.84	
5	7	Nigeria	Regina George, Funke Oladoye, Tosin Adeloye, Patience Okon George	3:25.11	
6	2	Ukraine	Olha Zemlyak, Nataliia Lupu, Nataliya Pyhyda, Olha Lyakhova	3:25.94	SB
7	9	France	Estelle Perrossier, Marie Gayot, Agnès Raharolahy, Floria Gueï	3:26.45	
8	3	Canada	Carline Muir, Aiyanna Stiverne, Sage Watson, Audrey Jean-Baptiste	3:27.69	
