= Ekaterina Doseykina =

Russian athletics competitor

Personal information
- Born: 30 March 1990 (age 36)

Sport
- Country: Russia
- Sport: Track and field
- Updated on 29 August 2015

Ekaterina Doseykina (born 30 March 1990) is a female middle-distance runner from Russia. She competed in the Women's 3000 metres steeplechase event at the 2015 World Championships in Athletics in Beijing, China.

== See also ==
- Russia at the 2015 World Championships in Athletics
