= Phyllis Francis =

American sprinter (born 1992)

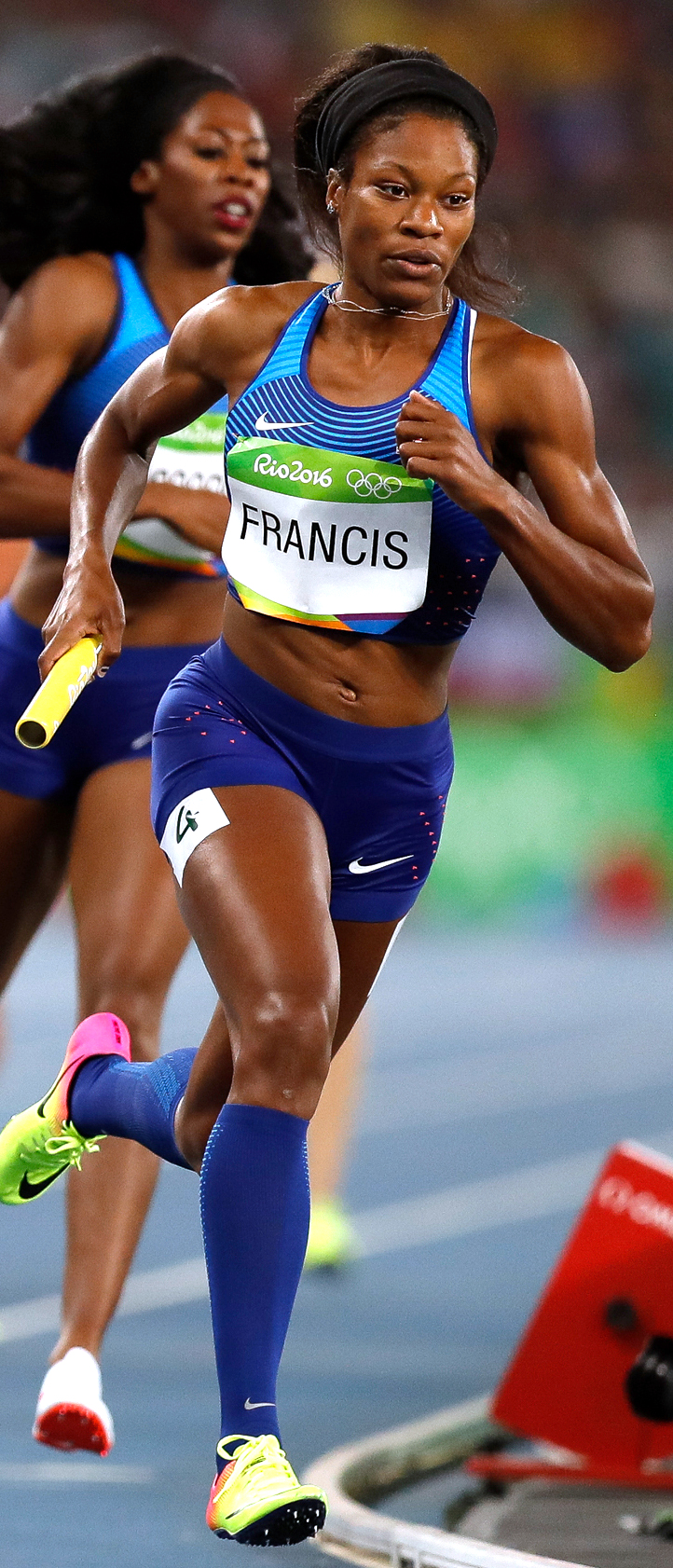
- Francis at the 2016 Summer Olympics

Personal information
- Nationality: American
- Born: May 4, 1992 (age 34) Queens, New York, U.S.
- Height: 5 ft 11 in (180 cm)
- Weight: 157 lb (71 kg)

Sport
- Country: United States
- Sport: Track and field
- Event: Sprinting
- College team: University of Oregon
- Club: Nike Running
- Turned pro: 2014
- Coached by: Vince Anderson

Achievements and titles
- Personal bests: 400 m: 49.61 200 m: 22.50 800 m: 2:04.83
Medal record
Women's track and field
Representing United States
Olympic Games
Gold medal – first place	2016 Rio de Janeiro	4 × 400 m relay
World Championships
Gold medal – first place	2017 London	400 m
Gold medal – first place	2017 London	4 × 400 m relay
Gold medal – first place	2019 Doha	4 × 400 m relay
Silver medal – second place	2015 Beijing	4 × 400 m relay
World Relay Championships
Gold medal – first place	2015 Nassau	4 × 400 m relay
Gold medal – first place	2017 Nassau	4 × 400 m relay
Pan American Junior Championships
Gold medal – first place	2011 Miramar	4 × 400 m relay
Bronze medal – third place	2011 Miramar	400 m
NACAC Championships in Athletics
Bronze medal – third place	2018 Toronto	200 m

Phyllis Chanez Francis (born May 4, 1992) is an American track and field athlete. She won the gold medal at the 2017 World Championships in the 400 metres and 4 × 400 metres relay events.

== Prep ==
Francis was a student at Catherine McAuley High School (Brooklyn) and the University of Oregon, class of 2014.

== NCAA ==
She is the American and Collegiate indoor 400-meter record holder, breaking Olympian Francena McCorory's 2010 record while winning the 2014 NCAA Women's Indoor Track and Field Championship. She is the first woman to win a 400-meter National NCAA Championship for the University of Oregon in its history.

== Professional ==
=== 2016 Olympics ===
Francis placed second in 400 m running a personal best time 49.94 behind Team USA teammates Allyson Felix, ahead of Natasha Hastings at 2016 United States Olympic Trials (track and field) and represented United States at Athletics at the 2016 Summer Olympics where she placed 5th in the women's 400 m final and won a gold medal in 4 × 400 meters.

=== 2017 World Championships ===
In 2017, Francis became the 400 m world champion by beating Allyson Felix – the defending world champion, and Shaunae Miller-Uibo – the Olympic champion at the 2017 World Championships in London, Great Britain. Her winning time of 49.92 seconds was a new personal best for Francis. Four days later, she won her second gold medal by anchoring the US women's 4 × 400 metres relay team to victory.

== International competitions ==
Year	Competition	Venue	Position	Event	Notes
Representing United States
2011	Pan American Junior Championships	Miramar, Florida	3rd	400 m	53.81
2011	Pan American Junior Championships	Miramar, Florida	1st	4 × 400 m relay	3:34.71
2015	World Relays	Nassau, Bahamas	1st	4 × 400 m relay	3:19.39
2015	World Championships	Beijing, China	7th	400 m	50.51
2015	World Championships	Beijing, China	2nd^{1}	4 × 400 m relay	3:23.05^{1}
2016	Olympic Games	Rio de Janeiro, Brazil	5th	400 m	50.41
2016	Olympic Games	Rio de Janeiro, Brazil	1st	4 × 400 m relay	3:19.06
2017	World Relays	Nassau, Bahamas	1st	4 × 400 m relay	3:24.36
2017	World Championships	London, United Kingdom	1st	400 m	49.92
2017	World Championships	London, United Kingdom	1st	4 × 400 m relay	3:19.02
2018	NACAC Championships	Toronto, Canada	3rd	200 m	22.91
2019	World Championships	Doha, Qatar	5th	400 m	49.61 PB
2019	World Championships	Doha, Qatar	1st	4 × 400 m relay	3:18.92

^{1}: Competed only in the heat.
