= 2015 World Championships in Athletics – Women's masters 400 metres =

Women's Masters 400 metres at the 2015 World Championships
- Venue: Beijing National Stadium
- Dates: 29 August (final)
- Competitors: 9 from 7 nations
- Winning time: 1:00.05

Medalists
gold medal	Sarah Louise Read Cayton	Great Britain
silver medal	Virginia Corinne Mitchell	Great Britain
bronze medal	Elizabeth Gail Wilson	New Zealand

The women's masters 400 metres at the 2015 World Championships in Athletics was a special demonstration event held at the Beijing National Stadium on 29 August. All the participants are in the W50 division (older than age 50).

Elizabeth Gail Wilson was the early leader, aggressively running the final turn ahead of Renee Henderson onto the home stretch. Henderson looked spent and started to drop back. Sarah Louise Read Cayton was not too far behind Wilson and moved into another gear that Wilson was unable to match. Clayton continued on to gold. From far back, Virginia Corinne Mitchell matched her British teammate's speed on the straight, sprinting past Henderson and Wilson for a distant, but solid silver.

== Schedule ==
Date	Time	Round
29 August 2015	17:35	Final

All times are local times (UTC+8)

== Results ==
Rank	Lane	Bib	Name	Nationality	Time	Reaction	Notes
1st place, gold medalist(s)	4	1006	Sarah Louise Read Cayton	Great Britain & N.I.	1:00.05	0.216	
2nd place, silver medalist(s)	3	1005	Virginia Corinne Mitchell	Great Britain & N.I.	1:00.81	0.159	
3rd place, bronze medalist(s)	5	1008	Elizabeth Gail Wilson	New Zealand	1:02.54	0.210	
4	1	1002	Julie Anne Forster	Australia	1:02.86	0.197	
5	6	1009	Renee Henderson	United States	1:03.88	0.194	
6	7	1003	Gianna Mogentale	Australia	1:04.96	0.213	
7	2	1007	Yukiko Usui	Japan	1:05.34	0.224	
8	8	1001	Mayka Emmi Garoglio	Argentina	1:06.10	0.169	
9	9	1004	Xiuju Guo	China	1:10.51	0.291	
