= Nicole Sassine =

Canadian sprinter

Personal information
- Born: 24 November 1989 (age 36)

Sport
- Country: Canada
- Sport: Track and field
- Event(s): 400 metres 4 × 400 metres relay

Nicole Sassine (born 24 November 1989) is a Canadian sprinter. She competed in the 4 × 400 metres relay event at the 2015 World Championships in Athletics in Beijing, China.
