= Kukushkin =

Kukushkin (Russian: Кукушкин, from кукушка meaning cuckoo) is a Russian masculine surname, its feminine counterpart is Kukushkina. It may refer to

- Anna Kukushkina (born 1992), Russian sprinter
- Mikhail Kukushkin (born 1987), Kazakhstani tennis player
- Vsevolod Kukushkin (born 1942), Soviet journalist, writer and ice hockey administrator
