= Funke Oladoye =

Nigerian athlete

Personal information
- Born: 5 December 1993 (age 32) Ondo City, Nigeria

Sport
- Sport: Athletics
- Event: 400 metres
Medal record
Women's Athletics
Representing Nigeria
African Games
Gold medal – first place	2015 Brazzaville	4x400 m relay

Funke Oladoye (born 5 December 1993) is a Nigerian sprinter specialising in the 400 metres. She competed in the 4 × 400 metres relay event at the 2015 World Championships in Athletics in Beijing finishing fifth. Her personal best in the 400 metres is 52.55 seconds (Warri 2014).

== International competitions ==
Year	Competition	Venue	Position	Event	Notes
Representing Nigeria
2014	Commonwealth Games	Glasgow, United Kingdom	2nd (h)	4 × 400 m relay	3:28.28
2015	World Championships	Beijing, China	5th	4 × 400 m relay	3:25.11
2015	African Games	Brazzaville, Republic of the Congo	1st	4 × 400 m relay	3:27.12
