= Ekaterina Smirnova =

Russian sprinter (born 1988)

Personal information
- Born: 8 September 1988 (age 37) Kaluga, Russia

Sport
- Sport: Track and field
- Updated on 29 August 2015

Ekaterina Alexandrovna Smirnova (Russian: Екатерина Александровна Смирнова; born 8 September 1988) is a female sprinter from Russia. She competed in the Women's 200 metres event at the 2015 World Championships in Athletics in Beijing, China.

Married to the participant of the Olympic Games, Russian sprinter Roman Smirnov.

== See also ==
- Russia at the 2015 World Championships in Athletics
