= Anna Kukushkina =

Russian sprinter

Personal information
- Born: 13 December 1992 (age 33) Russia

Sport
- Sport: Track and field
- Updated on 29 August 2015

Anna Kukushkina (born 13 December 1992) is a female sprinter from Russia. She competed in the Women's 200 metres event at the 2015 World Championships in Athletics in Beijing, China.

== See also ==
- Russia at the 2015 World Championships in Athletics
