= Russia at the 2015 World Championships in Athletics =

- Flag of Russia
- WA code: RUS
- National federation: All-Russia Athletic Federation
- Website: rusathletics.com (in Russian)

in Beijing, China 22–30 August 2015
- Competitors: 64 (29 men and 35 women) in 34 events
- Medals Ranked 9th: Gold 2 Silver 1 Bronze 1 Total 4

World Championships in Athletics appearances (overview)
- 1993; 1995; 1997; 1999; 2001; 2003; 2005; 2007; 2009; 2011; 2013; 2015; 2017–2025

Other related appearances
- Authorised Neutral Athletes (2017–pres.)

Russia competed at the 2015 World Championships in Athletics in Beijing, China, from 22–30 August 2015.

== Medalists ==
Medal	Athlete	Event	Date
Gold	Sergey Shubenkov	110 metres hurdles	28 August
Gold	Mariya Kuchina	High jump	29 August
Silver	Denis Kudryavtsev	400 metres hurdles	25 August
Bronze	Anna Chicherova	High jump	29 August

== Results ==
(q – qualified, NM – no mark, SB – season best)

=== Men ===
Track and road events

Athlete	Event	Heat		Semifinal		Final	
Athlete	Event	Result	Rank	Result	Rank	Result	Rank
Pavel Ivashko	400 metres	45.25 PB	5	Did not advance			
Konstantin Tolokonnikov	800 metres	1:46.07	4 q	1:48.32	4	Did not advance	
Aleksey Reunkov	Marathon	—N/a				2:18:12	17
Sergey Shubenkov	110 metres hurdles	13.31	3 Q	13.09	1 Q	12.98 NR	1st place, gold medalist(s)
Timofey Chalyy	400 metres hurdles	49.05 SB	2 Q	48.69 PB	3	Did not advance	
Denis Kudryavtsev	400 metres hurdles	48.51 PB	1 Q	48.23 PB	1 Q	48.05 NR	2nd place, silver medalist(s)
Ivan Shablyuyev	400 metres hurdles	49.56	5	Did not advance			
Nikolay Chavkin	3000 metres steeplechase	8:51.22	9	—N/a		Did not advance	
Ilgizar Safiullin	3000 metres steeplechase	8:39.58	9	—N/a		Did not advance	
Artyom Denmukhametov; Pavel Trenikhin; Denis Alekseyev; Pavel Ivashko; Denis Kudryavtsev*	4 × 400 metres relay	2:59.45 SB	4 q	—N/a		3:03.05	8
Aleksandr Yargunkin	50 kilometres walk	—N/a				DNS	

- The race walker Aleksandr Yargunkin never made it to Beijing. According to reports in the Russian press his travel to the Championships was terminated because he had tested positive for EPO.

Field events

Athlete	Event	Qualification		Final	
Athlete	Event	Distance	Position	Distance	Position
Daniil Tsyplakov	High jump	2.29	10 q	2.29	5
Ivan Ukhov	High jump	2.26	24	Did not advance	
Ivan Gertlein	Pole vault	5.70 PB	12 Q	NM	
Georgiy Gorokhov	Pole vault	5.65 PB	23	Did not advance	
Aleksandr Gripich	Pole vault	5.65	17	Did not advance	
Aleksandr Menkov	Long jump	8.08	8 q	8.02	6
Sergey Polyanskiy	Long jump	8.06	9 q	7.97	8
Lyukman Adams	Triple jump	16.85	7 q	17.28	5
Dmitriy Sorokin	Triple jump	16.99	6 q	16.99	7
Maksim Sidorov	Shot put	19.35	22	Did not advance	
Aleksandr Lesnoy	Shot put	19.78	16	Did not advance	
Dmitri Tarabin	Javelin throw	77.48	25	Did not advance	
Valeriy Iordan	Javelin throw	73.43	32	Did not advance	
Sergej Litvinov	Hammer throw	76.79	3 q	77.24 SB	5

Combined events – Decathlon

Athlete	Event	100 m	LJ	SP	HJ	400 m	110H	DT	PV	JT	1500 m	Final	Rank
Ilya Shkurenyov	Result	11.01 SB	7.50	14.09	2.10	47.88 PB	14.27	44.53	5.20	60.99 SB	4:24.98 PB	8538 PB	4
Ilya Shkurenyov	Points	858	935	734	896	915	940	757	972	753	778	8538 PB	4

=== Women ===
Track and road events

Athlete	Event	Heat		Semifinal		Final	
Athlete	Event	Result	Rank	Result	Rank	Result	Rank
Ekaterina Smirnova	200 metres	23.39	5	Did not advance			
Anna Kukushkina	200 metres	23.47	7	Did not advance			
Ekaterina Renzhina	400 metres	51.55	3 Q	51.49 PB	6	Did not advance	
Nadezhda Kotlyarova	400 metres	51.42 PB	3 Q	51.86	6	Did not advance	
Mariya Mikhailyuk	400 metres	52.16	4	Did not advance			
Yevgeniya Subbotina	800 metres	2:01.50	5	Did not advance			
Anna Shchagina	1500 metres	4:05.78	6 Q	4:17.82	9	Did not advance	
Tatyana Tomashova	1500 metres	4:10.79	4 Q	4:08.72	6 q	4:14.18	10
Gulshat Fazlitdinova	5000 metres	15:48.44	10	—N/a		Did not advance	
Yelena Korobkina	5000 metres	DNF	–	—N/a		Did not advance	
Alina Prokopeva	Marathon	—N/a				2:32:44	15
Yekaterina Galitskaya	100 metres hurdles	13.14	4 Q	DNF	–	Did not advance	
Nina Morozova	100 metres hurdles	13.06	5 q	12.91	4	Did not advance	
Vera Rudakova	400 metres hurdles	55.76	3 Q	56.41	7	Did not advance	
Natalya Aristarkhova	3000 metres steeplechase	10:02.79	12	—N/a		Did not advance	
Ekaterina Doseykina	3000 metres steeplechase	10:13.26	15	—N/a		Did not advance	
Lyudmila Lebedeva	3000 metres steeplechase	9:58.65	11	—N/a		Did not advance	
Yelizaveta Demirova; Anna Kukushkina; Marina Panteleyeva; Kseniya Ryzhova; Ekaterina Smirnova*	4 × 100 metres relay	43.09	4 q	—N/a		DNF	
Kseniya Aksyonova; Nadezhda Kotlyarova; Ekaterina Renzhina; Ksenia Zadorina; Mariya Mikhailyuk*	4 × 400 metres relay	3:23.75 SB	3 Q	—N/a		3:24.84	4

Field events

Athlete	Event	Qualification		Final	
Athlete	Event	Distance	Position	Distance	Position
Anna Chicherova	High jump	1.92	1 q	2.01	3rd place, bronze medalist(s)
Mariya Kuchina	High jump	1.92	1 q	2.01 PB	1st place, gold medalist(s)
Anzhelika Sidorova	Pole vault	4.55	11 q	NM	
Darya Klishina	Long jump	6.71	9 q	6.65	10
Yuliya Pidluzhnaya	Long jump	6.57	16	Did not advance	
Yelena Sokolova	Long jump	6.44	23	Did not advance	
Ekaterina Koneva	Triple jump	14.12	7 q	14.37	7
Yuliya Maltseva	Discus throw	57.08	25	Did not advance	
Yelena Panova	Discus throw	60.21	15	Did not advance	
Yekaterina Strokova	Discus throw	59.32	17	Did not advance	
Maria Abakumova	Javelin throw	56.08	30	Did not advance	
Vera Rebrik	Javelin throw	59.67	24	Did not advance	

Combined events – Heptathlon

Athlete	Event	100H	HJ	SP	200 m	LJ	JT	800 m	Final	Rank
Lyubov Tkach	Result	15.05	1.74	13.99	24.64	6.01	38.34	2:22.50	5729	23
Lyubov Tkach	Points	835	903	793	920	853	635	790	5729	23
