= 2015 World Championships in Athletics – Women's 200 metres =

Women's 200 metres at the 2015 World Championships
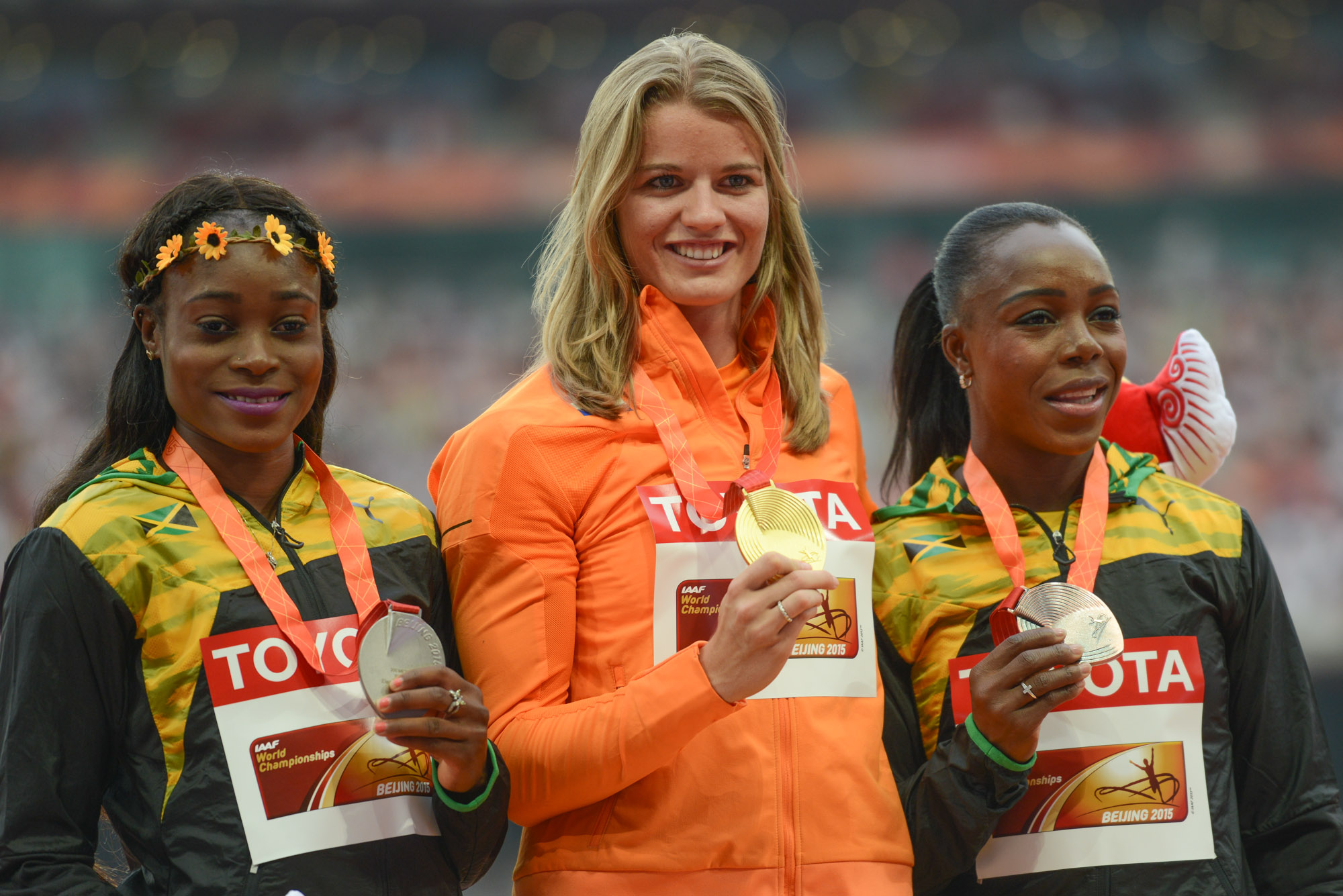
- Medalists L-R: Thompson, Schippers. Campbell-Brown
- Venue: Beijing National Stadium
- Dates: 26 August (heats); 27 August (semifinals); 28 August (final)
- Competitors: 49 from 34 nations
- Winning time: 21.63

Medalists
gold medal	Dafne Schippers	Netherlands
silver medal	Elaine Thompson	Jamaica
bronze medal	Veronica Campbell-Brown	Jamaica

The women's 200 metres at the 2015 World Championships in Athletics was held at the Beijing National Stadium on 26, 27 and 28 August.

== Summary ==
Shelly-Ann Fraser-Pryce of Jamaica entered the competition as defending champion but after winning the 100 metres, decided against running here. Reigning Olympic champion, Allyson Felix won a bye to compete by virtue of winning the 2014 IAAF Diamond League, but passed in order to focus on the 400 metres which would hold its final less than an hour before the semi-final round. 2013 silver medalist Murielle Ahouré did not return, and 2013 bronze medalist Blessing Okagbare did not start in the heats.

In the finals, two time Olympic Champion and 2011 World Champion Veronica Campbell-Brown relegated to lane 2 after finishing 7th in the semis, was the leader out of the blocks with Dina Asher-Smith and Jeneba Tarmoh also getting good starts. Elaine Thompson was last out of the blocks but rocketed around the turn to be the second to hit the straightaway behind "VCB." Candyce McGrone was about even with Asher-Smith and Dafne Schippers behind them with less than 90 metres to the finish. Thompson continued her speed to the front as Schippers let out her long strides to eat up territory. McGrone and Campbell-Brown were in the battle for bronze, Schippers looking too far back to catch Thompson but gaining with every stride. And Schippers caught her with 5 metres to spare, continuing on to the win. Campbell-Brown held off McGrone for bronze.

Schippers time of 21.63 made her the #3 performer of all time, Thompson at 21.66 became #5. Neither of them had been on the list prior to this race. It was a .40 improvement of her personal best for Schippers and a .44 improvement for Thompson. Schippers took down Marita Koch's 36-year-old, drug tainted European record and broke the 28 year old Championship Record held by East Germany's Silke Gladisch Moeller. Both runners were faster than Allyson Felix or Shelly-Ann Fraser-Pryce have ever run. Dina Asher-Smith's 22.07 in fifth place became the new British record and the fastest performance by a teenager, though cannot surpass Felix's junior world record because Asher Smith would turn 20 before the end of the calendar year.

== Records ==
Prior to the competition, the records were as follows:

World record	Florence Griffith-Joyner (USA)	21.34	Seoul, South Korea	29 September 1988
Championship record	Silke Gladisch-Möller (GDR)	21.74	Rome, Italy	3 September 1987
World leading	Allyson Felix (USA)	21.98	Doha, Qatar	15 May 2015
African record	Mary Onyali-Omagbemi (NGR)	22.07	Zürich, Switzerland	14 August 1996
Asian record	Li Xuemei (CHN)	22.01	Shanghai, China	22 October 1997
NACAC record	Florence Griffith-Joyner (USA)	21.34	Seoul, South Korea	29 September 1988
South American record	Ana Claudia Silva (BRA)	22.48	São Paulo, Brazil	6 August 2011
European record	Marita Koch (GDR)	21.71	Karl-Marx-Stadt, East Germany	10 June 1979
European record	Marita Koch (GDR)	21.71	Potsdam, East Germany	21 July 1984
European record	Heike Drechsler (GDR)	21.71	Jena, East Germany	29 June 1986
European record	Heike Drechsler (GDR)	21.71	Stuttgart, West Germany	29 August 1986
Oceanian record	Melinda Gainsford-Taylor (AUS)	22.23	Stuttgart, Germany	13 July 1997
The following records were established during the competition:
Championship record	Dafne Schippers (NED)	21.63	Beijing, China	28 August 2015
World leading	Dafne Schippers (NED)	21.63	Beijing, China	28 August 2015
European record	Dafne Schippers (NED)	21.63	Beijing, China	28 August 2015

== Qualification standards ==
Entry standards
23.20

== Schedule ==
Date	Time	Round
26 August 2015	19:15	Heats
27 August 2015	19:35	Semifinals
28 August 2015	21:00	Final

All times are local times (UTC+8)

== Results ==
KEY:	Q	Qualified	q	Fastest non-qualifiers	NR	National record	PB	Personal best	SB	Seasonal best

=== Heats ===
Qualification: Best 3 (Q) and next 3 fastest (q) qualify for the next round.

Rank	Heat	Name	Nationality	Time	Notes
1	7	Dina Asher-Smith	Great Britain & N.I.	22.22	Q, PB
2	1	Candyce McGrone	United States	22.45	Q
3	7	Sherone Simpson	Jamaica	22.52	Q, SB
4	7	Ivet Lalova	Bulgaria	22.54	Q, SB
5	6	Dafne Schippers	Netherlands	22.58	Q
6	2	Marie-Josée Ta Lou	Ivory Coast	22.73	Q, PB
7	4	Elaine Thompson	Jamaica	22.78	Q
8	3	Jeneba Tarmoh	United States	22.79	Q
8	5	Veronica Campbell-Brown	Jamaica	22.79	Q
10	4	Bianca Williams	Great Britain & N.I.	22.85	Q, SB
11	5	Semoy Hackett	Trinidad and Tobago	22.89	Q
12	4	Khamica Bingham	Canada	22.90	Q
13	1	Mujinga Kambundji	Switzerland	22.92	Q
13	1	Viktoriya Zyabkina	Kazakhstan	22.92	Q
15	2	Jenna Prandini	United States	22.95	Q
15	7	Anna Kiełbasińska	Poland	22.95	q
17	3	Gloria Hooper	Italy	22.99	Q, SB
18	6	Rosângela Santos	Brazil	23.01	Q
19	3	Kimberly Hyacinthe	Canada	23.03	Q
20	4	Maja Mihalinec	Slovenia	23.05	q, PB
21	2	Justine Palframan	South Africa	23.09	Q
22	6	Reyare Thomas	Trinidad and Tobago	23.09	Q
23	5	Margaret Adeoye	Great Britain & N.I.	23.10	Q
24	3	Maria Belibasaki	Greece	23.15	q
25	4	Nercely Soto	Venezuela	23.16	
26	2	Sabina Veit	Slovenia	23.18	
27	6	Hrystyna Stuy	Ukraine	23.21	
28	5	Crystal Emmanuel	Canada	23.22	
28	3	Isidora Jiménez	Chile	23.22	
30	2	Nataliya Strohova	Ukraine	23.25	
30	2	Kamaria Durant	Trinidad and Tobago	23.25	
32	7	Olga Safronova	Kazakhstan	23.28	SB
32	3	Kelly Proper	Ireland	23.28	
34	1	Ramona Papaioannou	Cyprus	23.30	
34	5	Chisato Fukushima	Japan	23.30	
34	2	Kineke Alexander	Saint Vincent and the Grenadines	23.30	
37	7	Vitória Cristina Rosa	Brazil	23.32	
38	1	Ella Nelson	Australia	23.33	
39	1	Celiangeli Morales	Puerto Rico	23.34	
40	7	Arialis Gandulla	Cuba	23.35	
41	6	Ekaterina Smirnova	Russia	23.39	
42	6	Sheniqua Ferguson	Bahamas	23.44	
43	5	Cynthia Bolingo	Belgium	23.45	
44	1	Anna Kukushkina	Russia	23.47	
45	5	Liang Xiaojing	China	23.57	PB
46	6	Olga Lenskiy	Israel	23.63	
47	4	LaVerne Jones-Ferrette	U.S. Virgin Islands	23.83	
48	5	Shanti Pereira	Singapore	24.22	
49	7	Kristina Pronzhenko	Tajikistan	25.77	
	3	Blessing Okagbare	Nigeria	DNS	
	4	Nataliya Pohrebnyak	Ukraine	DNS	

=== Semifinals ===
Qualification: First 2 in each heat (Q) and the next 2 fastest (q) advanced to the final.

Rank	Heat	Name	Nationality	Time	Notes
1	3	Dina Asher-Smith	Great Britain & N.I.	22.12	Q, PB
2	1	Elaine Thompson	Jamaica	22.13	Q
3	1	Candyce McGrone	United States	22.26	Q
4	3	Jeneba Tarmoh	United States	22.30	Q
5	1	Ivet Lalova	Bulgaria	22.32	q, PB
6	2	Dafne Schippers	Netherlands	22.36	Q
7	3	Veronica Campbell-Brown	Jamaica	22.47	q, SB
8	2	Sherone Simpson	Jamaica	22.53	Q
9	2	Marie-Josée Ta Lou	Ivory Coast	22.56	PB
10	1	Mujinga Kambundji	Switzerland	22.64	NR
11	2	Semoy Hackett	Trinidad and Tobago	22.75	
12	1	Viktoriya Zyabkina	Kazakhstan	22.77	NR
13	1	Bianca Williams	Great Britain & N.I.	22.87	
13	2	Jenna Prandini	United States	22.87	
13	3	Rosângela Santos	Brazil	22.87	
16	3	Gloria Hooper	Italy	22.92	PB
17	2	Khamica Bingham	Canada	23.02	
18	1	Reyare Thomas	Trinidad and Tobago	23.03	
19	1	Maja Mihalinec	Slovenia	23.04	PB
19	3	Justine Palframan	South Africa	23.04	
21	2	Anna Kiełbasińska	Poland	23.07	
21	3	Kimberly Hyacinthe	Canada	23.07	
23	3	Maria Belibasaki	Greece	23.28	
24	2	Margaret Adeoye	Great Britain & N.I.	23.34	

=== Final ===
The final was held at 21:00.

Rank	Lane	Name	Nationality	Time	Notes
1st place, gold medalist(s)	6	Dafne Schippers	Netherlands	21.63	CR, AR, WL
2nd place, silver medalist(s)	5	Elaine Thompson	Jamaica	21.66	PB
3rd place, bronze medalist(s)	2	Veronica Campbell-Brown	Jamaica	21.97	SB
4	7	Candyce McGrone	United States	22.01	PB
5	4	Dina Asher-Smith	Great Britain & N.I.	22.07	NR
6	8	Jeneba Tarmoh	United States	22.31	
7	3	Ivet Lalova	Bulgaria	22.41	
8	9	Sherone Simpson	Jamaica	22.50	SB
