= Melissa Caddle =

Guyanese sprinter

Personal information
- Nationality: Guyanese
- Born: 3 September 1992 (age 33)

Sport
- Sport: Track and field
- Event: 400m

Melissa Caddle (born 3 September 1992) is a Guyanese sprinter. She competed in the 400 metres event at the 2014 IAAF World Indoor Championships.
