= 2014 IAAF World Indoor Championships – Women's 400 metres =

The women's 400 metres at the 2014 IAAF World Indoor Championships took place on 7–8 March 2014.

== Medalists ==
Gold	Silver	Bronze
Francena McCorory; United States	Kaliese Spencer; Jamaica	Shaunae Miller; Bahamas

== Records ==
Standing records prior to the 2014 IAAF World Indoor Championships
World record	Jarmila Kratochvílová (TCH)	49.59	Milan, Italy	7 March 1982
Championship record	Olesya Forsheva (RUS)	50.04	Moscow, Russia	12 March 2006
World Leading	Francena McCorory (USA)	50.85	Albuquerque, United States	23 February 2014
African record	Charity Opara (NGR)	50.73	Stuttgart, Germany	1 February 1998
Asian record	Li Yajun (CHN)	52.27	Beijing, China	24 February 1996
European record	Jarmila Kratochvílová (TCH)	49.59	Milan, Italy	7 March 1982
North and Central American and Caribbean record	Christine Amertil (BAH)	50.34	Moscow, Russia	12 March 2006
Oceanian Record	Maree Holland (AUS)	52.17	Budapest, Hungary	4 March 1989
South American record	Aliann Pompey (GUY)	51.83	New York City, United States	26 February 2010

== Qualification standards ==
Indoor	Outdoor
53.15	51.20

== Schedule ==
Date	Time	Round
7 March 2014	10:05	Heats
7 March 2014	20:55	Semifinals
8 March 2014	19:40	Final

== Results ==
=== Heats ===
Qualification: First 2 (Q) and next 4 fastest (q) qualified for the semi-finals.

Rank	Heat	Name	Nationality	Time	Notes
1	1	Regina George	Nigeria	51.60	Q, SB
2	3	Shaunae Miller	Bahamas	52.10	Q, SB
3	1	Justyna Święty	Poland	52.13	Q, PB
4	1	Patricia Hall	Jamaica	52.19	q
5	2	Kaliese Spencer	Jamaica	52.26	Q
6	4	Francena McCorory	United States	52.37	Q
7	4	Denisa Rosolová	Czech Republic	52.37	Q, SB
DQ	3	Kseniya Ryzhova	Russia	~~52.47~~	Q, Doping
8	2	Lisanne de Witte	Netherlands	52.61	Q, PB
9	2	Joanna Atkins	United States	52.61	q
10	1	Margaret Adeoye	United Kingdom	52.69	q, SB
11	4	Esther Cremer	Germany	52.71	q
12	4	Kineke Alexander	Saint Vincent and the Grenadines	52.80	SB
13	3	Małgorzata Hołub	Poland	53.07	
14	2	Shana Cox	United Kingdom	53.10	
15	3	Nicky van Leuveren	Netherlands	53.34	
16	3	Melissa Caddle	Guyana	54.56	
17	4	Samantha Edwards	Antigua and Barbuda	54.74	

=== Semifinals ===
Qualification: First 3 (Q) qualified for the final.

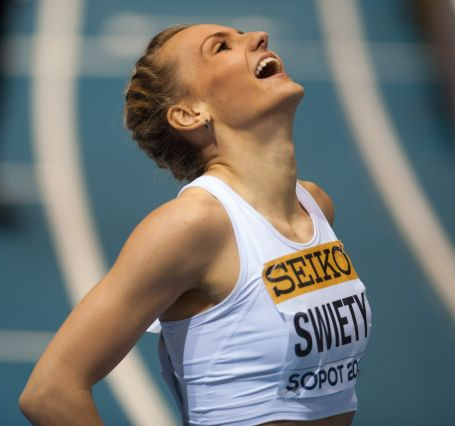
The fourth-placer, Justyna Święty of Poland

Rank	Heat	Name	Nationality	Time	Notes
1	2	Francena McCorory	United States	51.35	Q
2	2	Kaliese Spencer	Jamaica	51.58	Q, PB
3	2	Shaunae Miller	Bahamas	51.63	Q, SB
DQ	2	Kseniya Ryzhova	Russia	~~51.64~~	Doping
4	1	Patricia Hall	Jamaica	52.82	Q
5	1	Justyna Święty	Poland	52.97	Q
6	1	Joanna Atkins	United States	53.20	Q
7	2	Margaret Adeoye	United Kingdom	53.59	
8	2	Esther Cremer	Germany	53.60	
	1	Denisa Rosolová	Czech Republic	DNF	
	1	Lisanne de Witte	Netherlands	DQ	R163.2(b)
	1	Regina George	Nigeria	DNS	

=== Final ===
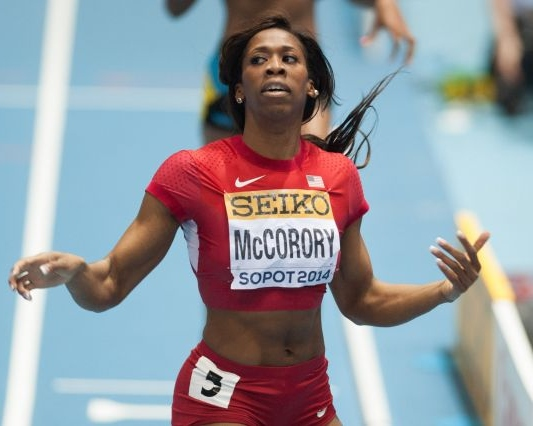
The gold medalist, Francena McCorory

Rank	Name	Nationality	Time	Notes
1st place, gold medalist(s)	Francena McCorory	United States	51.12	
2nd place, silver medalist(s)	Kaliese Spencer	Jamaica	51.54	PB
3rd place, bronze medalist(s)	Shaunae Miller	Bahamas	52.06	
4	Justyna Święty	Poland	52.20	
5	Patricia Hall	Jamaica	52.51	
6	Joanna Atkins	United States	52.55	
