= Jarryd Dunn =

English sprinter (born 1992)

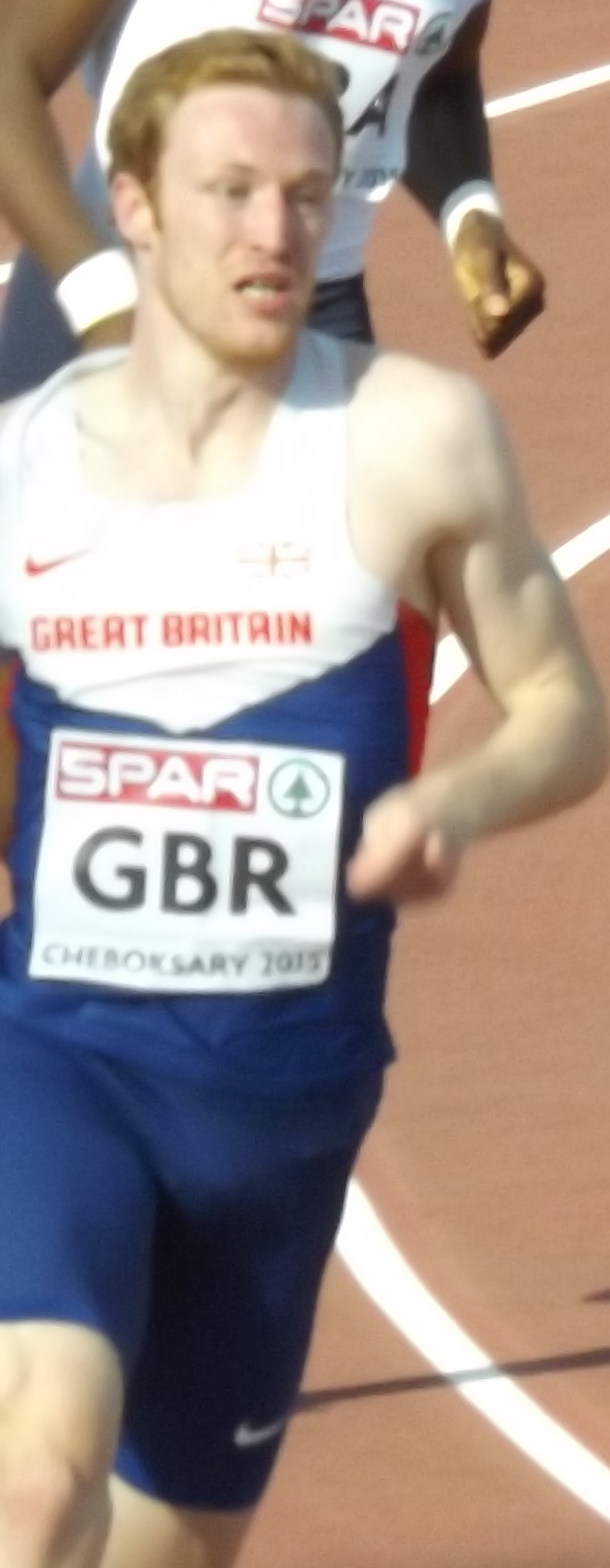
- Jarryd Dunn at the 2015 European Team Championships

Personal information
- Nationality: British (English)
- Born: 30 January 1992 (age 34) Walsall, England
- Education: University of Wolverhampton

Sport
- Sport: Athletics
- Event: 400 metres
- Club: Birchfield Harriers
- Coached by: Keith Holt
Medal record
Men's athletics
Representing Great Britain
World Championships
Bronze medal – third place	2015 Beijing	4×400 m relay
European Championships
Bronze medal – third place	2016 Amsterdam	4×400 m relay

Jarryd Paul Dunn (born 30 January 1992) is an English sprinter specialising in the 400 metres. He represented Great Britain at the 2015 World Championships in Beijing winning the bronze medal in the relay.

He has a personal best time of 45.09 which he achieved at the European Team Championships 2015 in Cheboksary. His indoor best is 46.67 set in Birmingham in 2015. He equalled this time during the 2016 indoor season at the Glasgow Grand Prix.

== Biography ==
He began as a middle-distance runner, winning age group silver medals both indoors and outdoors over 800 metres in 2008 at the Midlands Championships. He continued running 800 metres races up until 2011, having won a bronze medal at the English Schools' Athletics Championships over 400 metres the previous year as he switched over to the shorter distance.

In 2011, he was selected to be in the British team to go to the 2011 European Athletics Junior Championships, racing over 400 metres. He came second in his heat, automatically qualifying for the semi-final. He then ran a slower race in the semi-final, finishing fifth in his race, but he qualified as a fastest loser for the final. In the final he ran his slowest time of the competition, coming in last.

In 2012, he became the BUCS champion over 400 metres both indoors and outdoors. Indoors, he ran the fastest time recorded in the semi-finals before winning the final by 5 hundredths. Outdoors, he ran a PB and the fastest time recorded in the semi-finals to qualify for the final. He ran another PB in the final to win by two tenths of a second.

In 2013, he only competed twice, due to a back injury.

In 2014, he was selected for the European Team Championships as part of the British 4x400 metres relay squad, who finished fourth. He also finished fifth that year at the British Athletics Championships in the 400 metres.

In 2015, he was selected for the European Indoor Championships in the 400 metres. He came third in his heat, to make it through to the semi-finals as a fastest loser, in a race that he described as 'rubbish' and 'dreadful'. He finished fifth in his semi-final, failing to qualify for the final. This year he was selected for the European Team Championships again, but this time in the individual 400 metres. He won his race and the 400 metres overall, setting a PB of 45.09 seconds. That was his second recorded time under the British Athletics qualifying time, and meant that he only needed to come at least second at the British Championships to secure a place at the World Championships. He managed this, even though the event was predicted to be highly competitive, finishing second in the final behind Rabah Yousif. This led to them both being selected for the team to go to Beijing. At the World Championships, he competed in the 400 metres and the 4x400 metres relay. He finished 6th in his heat, meaning that he did not qualify for the semi-finals. He ran third leg for the British team in both the heats and the final to win a bronze medal.

== International competitions ==
Year	Competition	Venue	Position	Event	Notes
Representing Great Britain
2011	European Junior Championships	Tallinn, Estonia	8th	400 m	47.56
2011	European Junior Championships	Tallinn, Estonia	5th	4 × 400 m relay	3:08.56
2015	European Indoor Championships	Prague, Czech Republic	9th (sf)	400 m	47.29
2015	European Indoor Championships	Prague, Czech Republic	5th	4 × 400 m relay	3:08.56
2015	World Championships	Beijing, China	32nd (h)	400 m	45.49
2015	World Championships	Beijing, China	3rd	4 × 400 m relay	2:58.51
2016	European Championships	Amsterdam, Netherlands	14th (sf)	400 m	46.00
2016	European Championships	Amsterdam, Netherlands	1st (h)	4 × 400 m relay	3:01.63
2017	IAAF World Relays	Nassau, Bahamas	6th	4 × 400 m relay	3:03.84
