= Tajikistan at the 2013 World Championships in Athletics =

- WA code: TJK
- National federation: Athletics Federation of the Republic of Tajikistan

in Moscow
- Competitors: 17
- Medals: Gold 0 Silver 0 Bronze 0 Total 0

World Championships in Athletics appearances
- 1993; 1995; 1997; 1999; 2001; 2003; 2005; 2007; 2009; 2011; 2013; 2015; 2017; 2019; 2022; 2023

Tajikistan competed at the 2013 World Championships in Athletics in Moscow, Russia, from 10–18 August 2013. A team of 2 athletes was announced to represent the country in the event.

== Results ==
=== Men ===
Athlete	Event	Preliminaries		Final	
Athlete	Event	Width Height	Rank	Width Height	Rank
Dilshod Nazarov	Hammer throw	77.93	4 Q	78.31	5

=== Women ===
Athlete	Event	Preliminaries		Heats		Semifinals		Final	
Athlete	Event	Time	Rank	Time	Rank	Time	Rank	Time	Rank
Vladislava Ovcharenko	100 metres	12.37	38	Did not advance					
