= Francena McCorory =

American sprinter (born 1988)

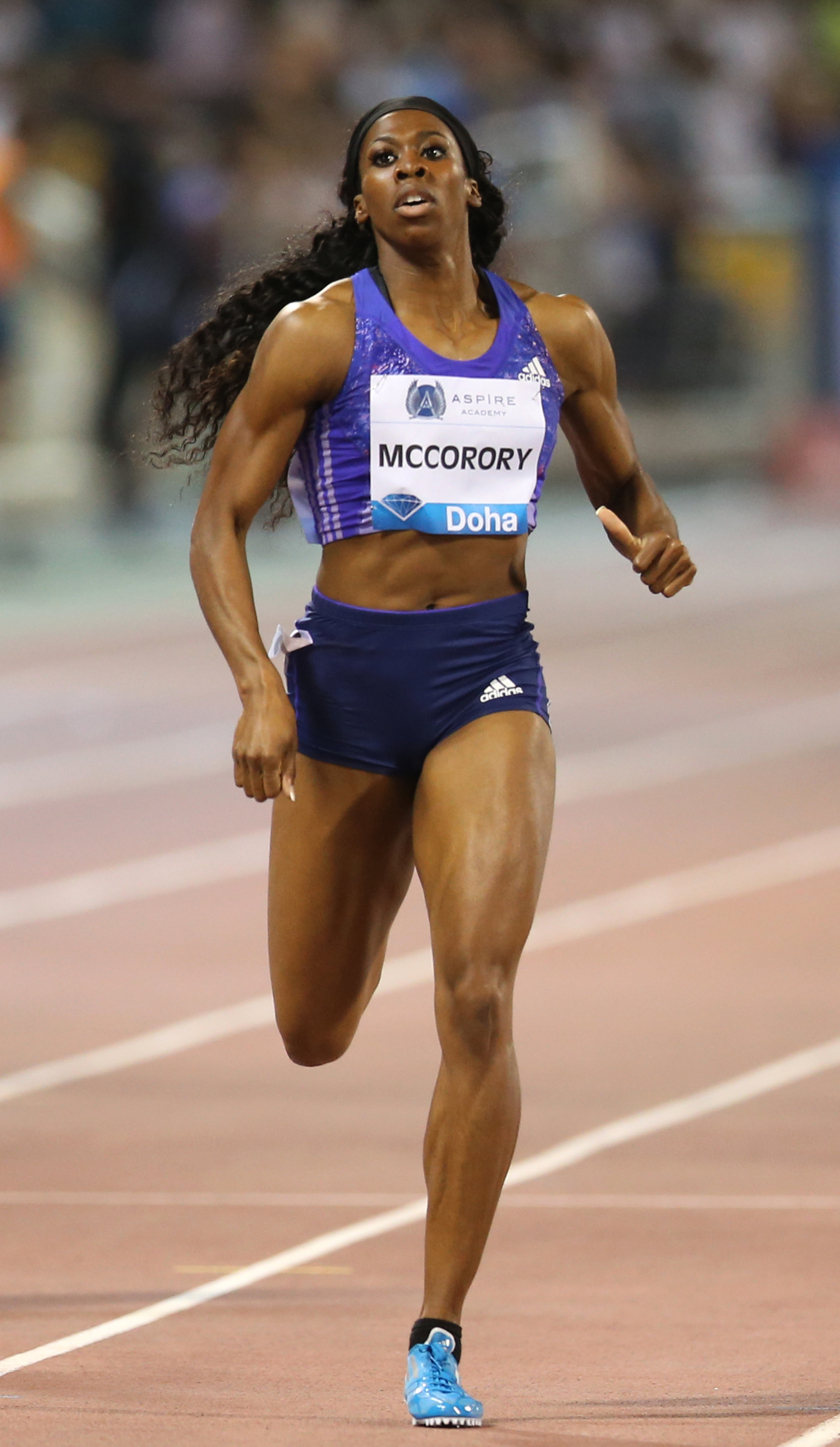
- McCorory in 2015

Personal information
- Full name: Francena Lynette McCorory
- Born: October 20, 1988 (age 38) Los Angeles, California, U.S.
- Height: 5 ft 8 in (173 cm)
- Weight: 150 lb (68 kg)

Sport
- Country: United States
- Sport: Track and field
- Event: 400 meters
- Club: Adidas, Herzogenaurach (GER)
Medal record
Olympic Games
Gold medal – first place	2012 London	4 × 400 m relay
Gold medal – first place	2016 Rio de Janeiro	4 × 400 m relay
World Championships
Gold medal – first place	2011 Daegu	4 × 400 m relay
Gold medal – first place	2013 Moscow	4 × 400 m relay
Silver medal – second place	2015 Beijing	4 × 400 m relay
Bronze medal – third place	2011 Daegu	400 m
World Indoor Championships
Gold medal – first place	2014 Sopot	400 m
Gold medal – first place	2014 Sopot	4 × 400 m relay
World Relay Championships
Gold medal – first place	2015 Nassau	4 × 400 m relay
Representing Americas
Continental Cup
Gold medal – first place	2014 Marrakesh	400 m
Gold medal – first place	2014 Marrakesh	4 × 400 m relay

Francena Lynette McCorory (born October 20, 1988) is an American retired track and field athlete, known primarily for running the 400 meters. She was the 2011 World bronze medalist in the 400 meters and was a member of the gold medal-winning 2012 and 2016 United States Olympic 4 × 400 m relay teams. She was the IAAF 400 meter Indoor World Champion in 2014. McCorory retired in 2021.

== Career ==
McCorory attended Bethel High School in her hometown of Hampton, Virginia where she displayed her talent for the 400 metres. A notable performance was at the 2005 Virginia Group AAA Eastern Region meet, where McCorory took her team's baton as much as 80 metres behind the leaders of the race, but cruised to victory past six other teams. Later, she set the National High School Indoor record at 51.93, a record previously held by future champion World Champion Sanya Richards, in her only attempt at the distance.

Despite being recruited by larger universities, McCorory attended her hometown school of Hampton University. She won the 2009 NCAA Women's Indoor Track and Field Championships and later in the year finished third in the NCAA Women's Outdoor Track and Field Championships. In 2010, she went to Fayetteville, Arkansas to defend her championship. Instead of merely repeating as champion, she won the race by over a second, setting the NCAA record and beating Diane Dixon's 19-year-old American record in the event, running 50.54. Later that year she won the NCAA Outdoor championship, in 50.69, actually slower than her Indoor record. A few weeks later, she improved her personal best to 50.52 while finishing second at the USA Outdoor Track and Field Championships.

After graduating Hampton, she improved her best to 50.49 again in second at the USA Outdoor Track and Field Championships, which qualified her for the 2011 World Championships in Athletics. A month after that, she took her best down to 50.29 at the Herculis meet in Monaco. She took it down one more time to 50.24 in the semi-finals of the 2011 World Championships in Athletics. In the finals, she wasn't quite as fast, finishing in fourth place in her first experience on the world stage. A few days later she anchored the United States team to a gold medal in the 4 × 400 m relay. In 2016, individual 3rd place Anastasia Kapachinskaya's 2008 Olympic samples were retested and found to have stanozol and turinabol. Being her second offense she was banned for life, disqualifying her position ahead of McCorory. In 2017, McCorory was advanced to the bronze medal.

Leading into the Olympic Trials, she improved her personal best to 50.06 at the Adidas Grand Prix. At the Olympic Trials, she qualified for the final and was assigned lane 7, just outside Sanya Richards-Ross in lane 6. Richards-Ross ran hard from the start closing down the stagger on McCorory. Sensing the challenge, McCorory exploded down the backstretch, leading around the turn to the head of the home stretch, but she paid the price for the early effort and struggled to the finish. Richards-Ross charged past her, in the process setting the best time of the year, followed by Dee Dee Trotter, who made her third straight Olympic team. McCorory managed to hold off Debbie Dunn to claim third place and a trip to the Olympics.

At the 2012 Summer Olympics, McCorory competed in the 400 m and 4 × 400 m relay. In the 400 m final, McCorory finished 7th with a time of 50.33. On the relay, McCorory ran the 3rd leg of the women's 4 × 400 m (in a leg time of 49.39), with DeeDee Trotter, Allyson Felix, and Sanya Richards-Ross, with the winning time being 3:16.87, the 3rd fastest time in Olympic history behind the Soviet Union and United States at the 1988 Summer Olympics, and the 5th fastest time overall. In 2012 Penn Relays, Francena McCorory won the 4 × 400 with Allyson Felix, Natasha Hastings, and Sanya Richards Ross.

At the 2013 USA Outdoor Track and Field Championships she improved her personal record to 50.01. In finishing second, she qualified for the 2013 World Championships where she improved her personal best under 50 to 49.86 in the semi-final round and got 2nd place in the 4 × 400 after failing to pass the Russian, but they were upgraded to gold because the Russians cheated. In the 2013 Penn Relays, Francena McCorory held off Great Britain's Perri Shakes Drayton to get gold for the USA.

At the 2014 World Indoor Championships, she was a double gold medal winner taking the 400 metres and the 4 × 400 relay titles. Later in the season at the 2014 USA Outdoor Track and Field Championships another improvement of her personal record to 49.48, defeating Sanya Richards to take the win. Later that year McCorory added to her titles by being named HBCU Top 30 Under 30, in June 2014. McCorory finished 4th at 2015 USA Outdoor Track and Field Championships in 50.88.

== Major competition record ==
Year	Competition	Venue	Position	Event	Notes
Representing the United States
2008	NACAC U-23 Championships	Toluca, Mexico	7th (h)	400 m	53.51 A
2011	World Championships	Daegu, South Korea	3rd	400 m	50.45
2011	World Championships	Daegu, South Korea	1st	4 × 400 m relay	3:18.09
2012	Olympic Games	London, United Kingdom	6th	400 m	50.33
2012	Olympic Games	London, United Kingdom	1st	4 × 400 m relay	3:16.87
2013	World Championships	Moscow, Russia	5th	400 m	50.68
2013	World Championships	Moscow, Russia	1st	4 × 400 m relay	3:20.41
2014	World Indoor Championships	Sopot, Poland	1st	400 m	51.12
2014	World Indoor Championships	Sopot, Poland	1st	4 × 400 m relay	3:24.83
2015	World Relay Championships	Nassau, Bahamas	1st	4 × 400 m relay	3:19.39
2015	World Championships	Beijing, China	2nd	4 × 400 m relay	3:19.44
2016	Olympic Games	Rio de Janeiro, Brazil	1st (h)	4 × 400 m relay	3:21.42
