= Great Britain and Northern Ireland at the 2015 World Championships in Athletics =

- WA code: GBR
- Website: www.britishathletics.org.uk

in Beijing
- Competitors: 59
- Medals Ranked 4th: Gold 4 Silver 1 Bronze 2 Total 7

World Championships in Athletics appearances (overview)
- 1976; 1980; 1983; 1987; 1991; 1993; 1995; 1997; 1999; 2001; 2003; 2005; 2007; 2009; 2011; 2013; 2015; 2017; 2019; 2022; 2023; 2025

Great Britain and Northern Ireland (often referred to as Great Britain) competed at the 2015 World Championships in Athletics in Beijing, China, from 22–30 August 2015. This was their most successful championships to date.

== Medallists ==
The following British competitors won medals at the Championships

| Medal | Name | Event | Date |
|---|---|---|---|
| Gold | Mo Farah | 10,000 metres | 22 August |
| Gold | Jessica Ennis-Hill | Heptathlon | 23 August |
| Gold | Greg Rutherford | Long jump | 25 August |
| Gold | Mo Farah | 5000 metres | 29 August |
| Silver | Shara Proctor | Long jump | 28 August |
| Bronze | Christine Ohuruogu; Anyika Onuora; Eilidh Child; Seren Bundy-Davies; Kirsten McAslan* | 4 × 400 metres relay | 30 August |
| Bronze | Rabah Yousif; Delano Williams; Jarryd Dunn; Martyn Rooney | 4 × 400 metres relay | 30 August |

== Results ==
=== Men ===
Track and road events

| Athlete | Event | Heat | | Semifinal | | Final | |
| Athlete | Event | Result | Rank | Result | Rank | Result | Rank |
|---|---|---|---|---|---|---|---|
| James Dasaolu | 100 metres | 10.13 | 4 | Did not advance | | | |
| Richard Kilty | 100 metres | 10.12 | 4 q | 10.20 | 8 | Did not advance | |
| Chijindu Ujah | 100 metres | 10.05 | 2 Q | 10.05 | 5 | Did not advance | |
| Zharnel Hughes | 200 metres | 20.13 | 1 Q | 20.14 | 1 Q | 20.02 PB | 5 |
| Daniel Talbot | 200 metres | 20.35 | 3 Q | 20.27 PB | 6 | Did not advance | |
| Jarryd Dunn | 400 metres | 45.49 | 6 | Did not advance | | | |
| Martyn Rooney | 400 metres | 44.45 PB | 4 q | 45.29 | 6 | Did not advance | |
| Rabah Yousif | 400 metres | 45.24 | 1 Q | 44.54 PB | 3 q | 44.68 | 6 |
| Kyle Langford | 800 metres | 1:49.78 | 7 | Did not advance | | | |
| Michael Rimmer | 800 metres | 1:48.70 | 4 | Did not advance | | | |
| Charlie Grice | 1500 metres | 3:43.21 | 4 Q | 3:35.58 | 4 Q | 3:36.21 | 9 |
| Chris O'Hare | 1500 metres | 3:38.43 | 5 Q | 3:44.36 | 7 | Did not advance | |
| Tom Farrell | 5000 metres | 13:45.29 | 4 Q | —N/a | | 14:08.87 | 15 |
| Mo Farah | 5000 metres | 13:19.44 | 2 Q | —N/a | | 13:50.38 | 1st place, gold medalist(s) |
| Mo Farah | 10,000 metres | —N/a | | | | 27:01.13 | 1st place, gold medalist(s) |
| Lawrence Clarke | 110 metres hurdles | 13.61 | 5 q | 13.53 | 7 | Did not advance | |
| Niall Flannery | 400 metres hurdles | 48.90 SB | 2 Q | 49.17 | 4 | Did not advance | |
| Jack Green | 400 metres hurdles | DNS | | Did not advance | | | |
| Richard Kilty; Danny Talbot; James Ellington; Chijindu Ujah; Harry Aikines-Aryeetey* | 4 × 100 metres relay | 38.20 SB | 2 Q | —N/a | | DNF | |
| Rabah Yousif; Delano Williams; Jarryd Dunn; Martyn Rooney | 4 × 400 metres relay | 2:59.05 SB | 1 Q | —N/a | | 2:58.51 SB | 3rd place, bronze medalist(s) |
| Tom Bosworth | 20 kilometres walk | —N/a | | | | 1:23.58 | 24 |

Field events

| Athlete | Event | Qualification | | Final | |
| Athlete | Event | Distance | Position | Distance | Position |
|---|---|---|---|---|---|
| Robert Grabarz | High jump | 2.26 | 18 | Did not advance | |
| Dan Bramble | Long jump | 7.83 | 18 | Did not advance | |
| Greg Rutherford | Long jump | 8.25 | 2 Q | 8.41 SB | 1st place, gold medalist(s) |
| Steven Lewis | Pole vault | 5.40 | 15 | Did not advance | |
| Mark Dry | Hammer throw | 73.87 | 9 | Did not advance | |
| Nick Miller | Hammer throw | 77.42 | 2 Q | 72.94 | 11 |

=== Women ===
Track and road events

| Athlete | Event | Heat | | Semifinal | | Final | |
| Athlete | Event | Result | Rank | Result | Rank | Result | Rank |
|---|---|---|---|---|---|---|---|
| Asha Philip | 100 metres | 11.28 | 3 Q | 11.21 | 7 | Did not advance | |
| Margaret Adeoye | 200 metres | 23.10 | 3 Q | 23.34 | 7 | Did not advance | |
| Dina Asher-Smith | 200 metres | 22.22 PB | 1 Q | 22.12 PB | 1 Q | 22:07 NR | 5 |
| Bianca Williams | 200 metres | 22.85 | 2 Q | 22.87 | 6 | Did not advance | |
| Christine Ohuruogu | 400 metres | 51.01 | 1 Q | 50.16 | 1 Q | 50.63 | 8 |
| Anyika Onuora | 400 metres | 51.14 PB | 4 q | 50.87 PB | 5 | Did not advance | |
| Jenny Meadows | 800 metres | 2:00.37 | 4 q | 2:00.53 | 7 | Did not advance | |
| Shelayna Oskan-Clarke | 800 metres | 2:01.72 | 3 Q | 1:58.86 PB | 3 Q | 1:58.99 | 5 |
| Lynsey Sharp | 800 metres | 1:58.98 SB | 2 Q | 1:59.33 | 8 | Did not advance | |
| Laura Muir | 1500 metres | 4:05.53 | 2 Q | 4:07.95 | 3 Q | 4:11.48 | 5 |
| Laura Weightman | 1500 metres | 4:06.13 | 6 Q | DNS | | Did not advance | |
| Stephanie Twell | 5000 metres | 15:34.72 | 7 q | —N/a | | 15:26.24 | 12 |
| Kate Avery | 10,000 metres | —N/a | | | | 32:16.19 | 15 |
| Cindy Ofili | 100 metres hurdles | 12.97 | 4 Q | 12.91 | 6 | Did not advance | |
| Tiffany Porter | 100 metres hurdles | 12.73 | 1 Q | 12.62 | 1 Q | 12.68 | 5 |
| Meghan Beesley | 400 metres hurdles | 54.52 PB | 3 Q | 55.41 | 3 | Did not advance | |
| Eilidh Child | 400 metres hurdles | 54.74 | 2 Q | 54.80 | 3 q | 54.78 | 6 |
| Dina Asher-Smith; Desiree Henry; Asha Philip; Jodie Williams; Bianca Williams* | 4 × 100 metres relay | 42.48 SB | 2 Q | —N/a | | 42.10 NR | 4 |
| Seren Bundy-Davies; Eilidh Child; Christine Ohuruogu; Anyika Onuora; Kirsten McAslan* | 4 × 400 metres relay | 3:23.90 SB | 2 Q | —N/a | | 3:23.62 SB | 3rd place, bronze medalist(s) |

Field events

| Athlete | Event | Qualification | | Final | |
| Athlete | Event | Distance | Position | Distance | Position |
|---|---|---|---|---|---|
| Morgan Lake | High jump | 1.89 | 14 | Did not advance | |
| Isobel Pooley | High jump | 1.89 | 19 | Did not advance | |
| Katarina Johnson-Thompson | Long jump | 6.79 | 5 Q | 6.63 | 11 |
| Shara Proctor | Long jump | 6.68 | 11 q | 7.07 NR | 2nd place, silver medalist(s) |
| Lorraine Ugen | Long jump | 6.87 | 2 Q | 6.85 | 5 |
| Holly Bradshaw | Pole vault | 4.55 SB | =1 q | 4.70 SB | 7 |
| Sophie Hitchon | Hammer throw | 71.07 | 8 'q | 73.86 NR | 4 |
| Goldie Sayers | Javelin throw | 58.28 | 26 | Did not advance | |

Combined events – Heptathlon

| Athlete | Event | 100H | HJ | SP | 200 m | LJ | JT | 800 m | Final | Rank |
|---|---|---|---|---|---|---|---|---|---|---|
| Jessica Ennis-Hill | Result | 12.91 | 1.86 SB | 13.73 | 23.42 SB | 6.43 SB | 42.51 | 2:10.13 | 6669 SB | 1st place, gold medalist(s) |
| Jessica Ennis-Hill | Points | 1138 | 1054 | 776 | 1037 | 985 | 716 | 963 | 6669 SB | 1st place, gold medalist(s) |
| Katarina Johnson-Thompson | Result | 13.37 PB | 1.89 | 12.47 PB | 23.08 SB | NM | 39.52 | 2:50.73 | 5039 SB | 28 |
| Katarina Johnson-Thompson | Points | 1069 | 1093 | 692 | 1071 | 0 | 658 | 456 | 5039 SB | 28 |

Key

- Note–Ranks given for track events are within the athlete's heat only
- Q = Qualified for the next round
- q = Qualified for the next round as a fastest loser or, in field events, by position without achieving the qualifying target
- NR = National record
- PB = Personal best
- N/A = Round not applicable for the event
- Bye = Athlete not required to compete in round

== Sources ==
- British team
