= South Sudan at the 2017 World Championships in Athletics =

- WA code: SSD

in London
- Competitors: 1
- Medals: Gold 0 Silver 0 Bronze 0 Total 0

World Championships in Athletics appearances
- 2017; 2019; 2022; 2023

South Sudan competed at the 2017 World Championships in Athletics in London, United Kingdom, from 4–13 August 2017.

== Results ==
(q – qualified, NM – no mark, SB – season best)

=== Men ===
Track and road events

Athlete	Event	Heat		Final	
Athlete	Event	Result	Rank	Result	Rank
David Kulang	5000 metres	14:53.19 SB	38	Did not advance	
