= 2015 World Championships in Athletics =

Athletics competition in Beijing, China

IAAF World Championships Beijing 2015
- Nations: 205
- Athletes: 1,781
- Events: 47
- Dates: 22 August 2015 – 30 August 2015
- Opened by: Xi Jinping, CCP General Secretary and President of China
- Closed by: IAAF President Lamine Diack
- Main venue: Beijing National Stadium

The 2015 IAAF World Championships (Chinese: 2015年世界田徑錦標賽), the fifteenth edition of the IAAF World Championships, were held from 22 August to 30 August at the National Stadium in Beijing, China. Forty-three nations won medals, 144 of which were awarded. Kenya topped the medal table for the first time, with 7 gold, 6 silver and 3 bronze medals. The United States won 18 medals, six gold, six silver and six bronze, which was the highest tally. Host nation China, finished 11th on the medals table, while Russia finished ninth.

205 IAAF member countries and territories participated, two more than in 2013, with new IAAF member, Kosovo, making its debut. South Sudan was also set to participate for the first time, but its sole athlete did not show up in Beijing.

Eritrea won their first world title at these championships, with Ghirmay Ghebreslassie winning the men's marathon.

The event was the largest sporting event to take place at the Beijing National Stadium ("Bird's Nest") since the 2008 Summer Olympics.

== Bidding process ==
When the seeking deadline passed on 15 March 2010, three candidate cities (Beijing, London and Chorzów) had confirmed their candidatures. London then withdrew citing that they didn't want to seem to be biased towards the bids for the Olympic Stadium by committing themselves to an athletics event, as the host for this event was to be announced before their 2011 stadium bid deadline. London then stated that they would bid for 2017 and had the blessing of the IAAF to do so. The IAAF announced Beijing as the winning candidate at the IAAF Council Meeting in Monaco on 20 November 2010. The Council of IAAF approved the dates of 22 August until 30 August 2015.

== Venue ==
Beijing National Stadium during the championships

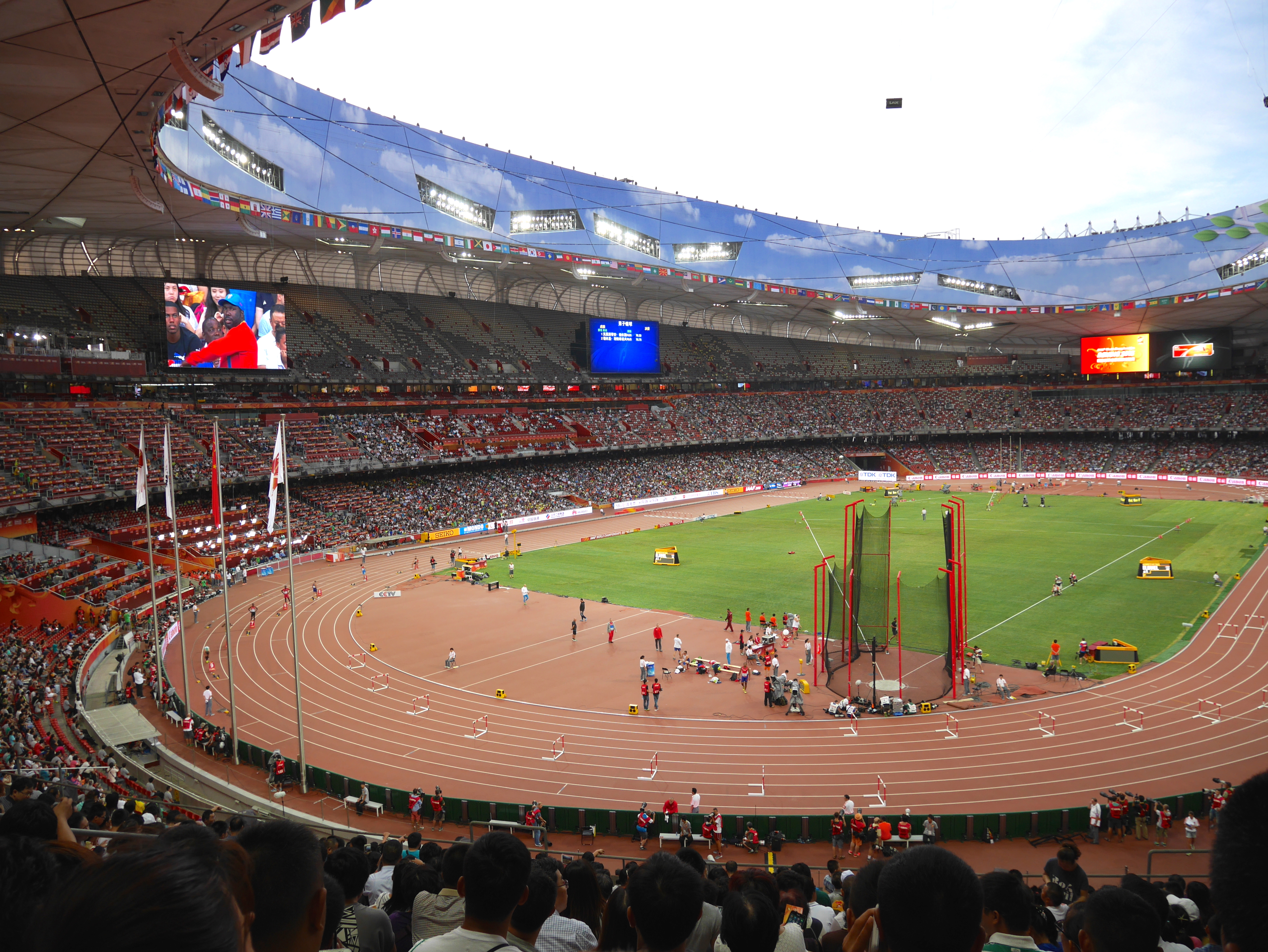
Inside in daylight

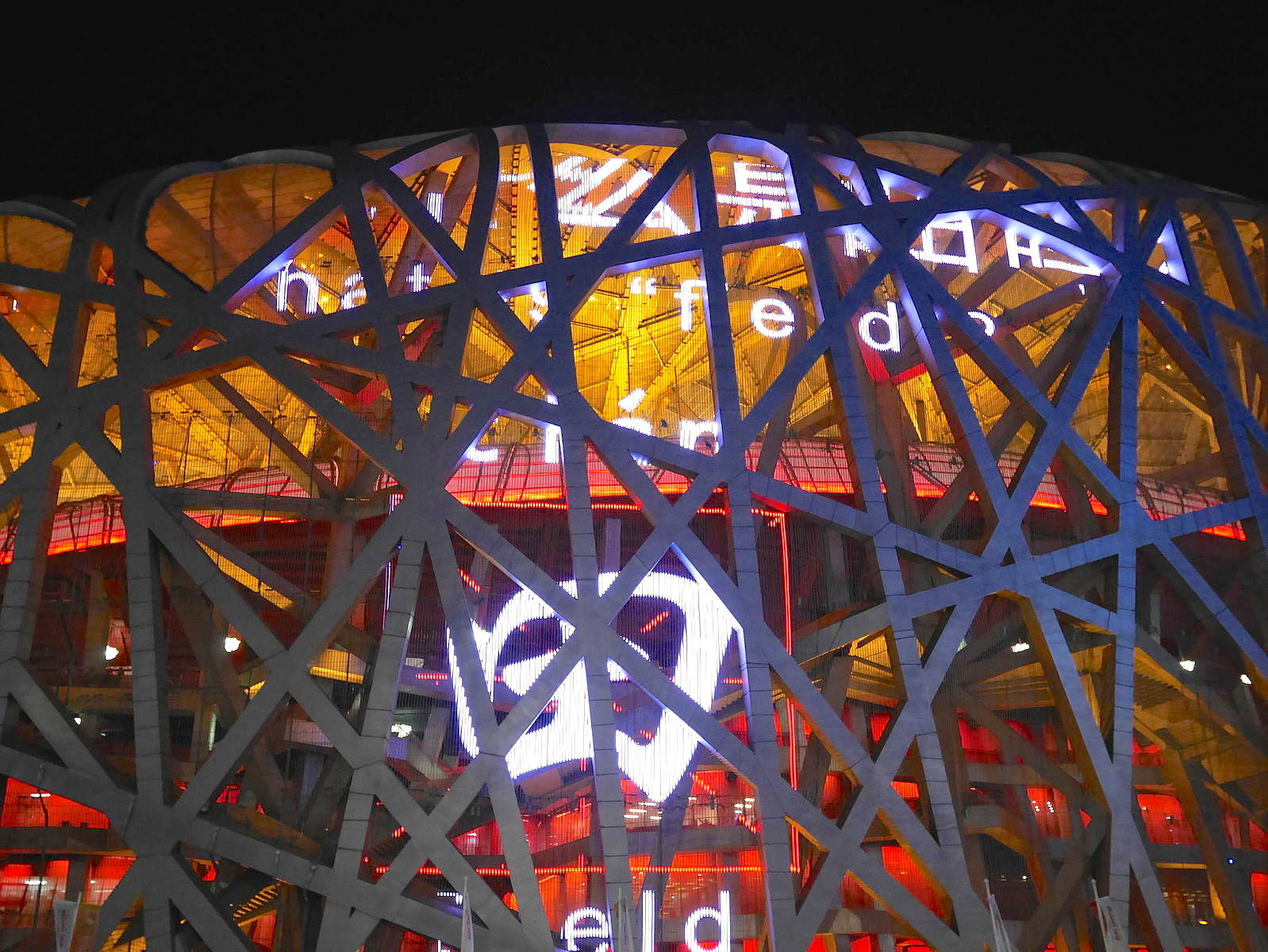
Outside at night

The event was primarily held at the Beijing National Stadium, which served as the athletics venue during the 2008 Summer Olympics. Weather concerns prompted a reduction in capacity for the World Championships in Athletics; only the lower and middle tiers of the stadium were open, capping the venue at around 54,000 spectators rather than its capacity of 80,000. Tickets for the championships were available in three price categories, ranging from 50 RMB to 500 RMB.

== Event schedule ==
Legend
Key	P	Q	H	½	F
Value	Preliminary round	Qualifiers	Heats	Semifinals	Final

All dates are CST (UTC+8)

Men
Date	22 Aug		23 Aug			24 Aug		25 Aug		26 Aug		27 Aug		28 Aug		29 Aug		30 Aug	
Event	M	A	M	A		M	A	M	A	M	A	M	A	M	A	M	A	M	A
100 m	Q	H		½	F														
200 m									H		½		F						
400 m			H				½				F								
800 m	H			½					F										
1500 m												H			½				F
5000 m										H							F		
10,000 m		F																	
Marathon	F																		
110 m hurdles										H			½		F				
400 m hurdles		H		½					F										
3000 m steeplechase	H						F												
4 × 100 m relay																H	F		
4 × 400 m relay																H			F
20 km walk			F																
50 km walk																F			
Long jump						Q			F										
Triple jump										Q			F						
High jump														Q					F
Pole vault	Q						F												
Shot put			Q	F															
Discus throw												Q					F		
Hammer throw	Q			F															
Javelin throw							Q				F								
Decathlon														F					
Masters 800 m																	F		

Women
Date	22 Aug		23 Aug		24 Aug			25 Aug		26 Aug		27 Aug		28 Aug			29 Aug		30 Aug	
Event	M	A	M	A	M	A		M	A	M	A	M	A	M	A		M	A	M	A
100 m			H			½	F													
200 m											H		½		F					
400 m					H				½				F							
800 m										H			½					F		
1500 m	H			½					F											
5000 m												H								F
10,000 m						F														
Marathon																			F	
100 m hurdles												H			½	F				
400 m hurdles			H			½					F									
3000 m steeplechase					H						F									
4 × 100 m relay																	H	F		
4 × 400 m relay																	H			F
20 km walk														F						
Long jump												Q			F					
Triple jump	Q					F														
High jump												Q						F		
Pole vault					Q						F									
Shot put	Q	F																		
Discus throw					Q				F											
Hammer throw										Q			F							
Javelin throw															Q					F
Heptathlon	F																			
Masters 400 m																		F		

== Event summary ==
=== Men ===
==== Track ====
Chronology: 2011 | 2013 | 2015 | 2017 | 2019

Event	Gold		Silver		Bronze	
100 metres	Usain Bolt; Jamaica (JAM)	9.79 SB	Justin Gatlin; United States (USA)	9.80	Trayvon Bromell; United States (USA) Andre De Grasse; Canada (CAN) PB	9.92
200 metres	Usain Bolt; Jamaica (JAM)	19.55 WL	Justin Gatlin; United States (USA)	19.74	Anaso Jobodwana; South Africa (RSA)	19.87 NR
400 metres	Wayde van Niekerk; South Africa (RSA)	43.48 WL AR	LaShawn Merritt; United States (USA)	43.65 PB	Kirani James; Grenada (GRN)	43.78
800 metres	David Rudisha; Kenya (KEN)	1:45.84	Adam Kszczot; Poland (POL)	1:46.08	Amel Tuka; Bosnia and Herzegovina (BIH)	1:46.30
1500 metres	Asbel Kiprop; Kenya (KEN)	3:34.40	Elijah Manangoi; Kenya (KEN)	3:34.63	Abdalaati Iguider; Morocco (MAR)	3:34.67
5000 metres	Mo Farah; Great Britain & N.I. (GBR)	13:50.38	Caleb Ndiku; Kenya (KEN)	13:51.75	Hagos Gebrhiwet; Ethiopia (ETH)	13:51.86
10,000 metres	Mo Farah; Great Britain & N.I. (GBR)	27:01.13	Geoffrey Kamworor; Kenya (KEN)	27:01.76	Paul Tanui; Kenya (KEN)	27:02.83
Marathon	Ghirmay Ghebreslassie; Eritrea (ERI)	2:12:27	Yemane Tsegay; Ethiopia (ETH)	2:13:07	Solomon Mutai; Uganda (UGA)	2:13:29
110 metres hurdles	Sergey Shubenkov; Russia (RUS)	12.98 NR	Hansle Parchment; Jamaica (JAM)	13.03	Aries Merritt; United States (USA)	13.04
400 metres hurdles	Nicholas Bett; Kenya (KEN)	47.79 WL NR	Denis Kudryavtsev; Russia (RUS)	48.05 NR	Jeffery Gibson; Bahamas (BAH)	48.17 NR
3000 metres steeplechase	Ezekiel Kemboi; Kenya (KEN)	8:11.28	Conseslus Kipruto; Kenya (KEN)	8:12.38	Brimin Kipruto; Kenya (KEN)	8:12.54
20 kilometres walk	Miguel Ángel López; Spain (ESP)	1:19:14 PB	Wang Zhen; China (CHN)	1:19:29	Benjamin Thorne; Canada (CAN)	1:19:57 NR
50 kilometres walk	Matej Tóth; Slovakia (SVK)	3:40:32	Jared Tallent; Australia (AUS)	3:42:17	Takayuki Tanii; Japan (JPN)	3:42:55
4 × 100 metres relay	Jamaica; Nesta Carter; Asafa Powell; Nickel Ashmeade; Usain Bolt; Rasheed Dwyer*	37.36 WL	China; Mo Youxue; Xie Zhenye; Su Bingtian; Zhang Peimeng	38.01	Canada; Aaron Brown; Andre De Grasse; Brendon Rodney; Justyn Warner	38.13
4 × 400 metres relay	United States; David Verburg; Tony McQuay; Bryshon Nellum; LaShawn Merritt; Kyle Clemons*; Vernon Norwood*	2:57.82 WL	Trinidad and Tobago; Renny Quow; Lalonde Gordon; Deon Lendore; Machel Cedenio; Jarrin Solomon*	2:58.20 NR	Great Britain & N.I. Rabah Yousif; Delanno Williams; Jarryd Dunn; Martyn Rooney	2:58.51
WR world record | AR area record | CR championship record | GR games record | NR national record | OR Olympic record | PB personal best | SB season best | WL world leading (in a given season) * Runners who participated in the heats only and received medals

==== Field ====
Chronology: 2011 | 2013 | 2015 | 2017 | 2019

Event	Gold		Silver		Bronze	
High jump	Derek Drouin; Canada (CAN)	2.34 m	Bohdan Bondarenko; Ukraine (UKR) Zhang Guowei; China (CHN)	2.33 m	Not awarded	
Pole vault	Shawnacy Barber; Canada (CAN)	5.90 m	Raphael Holzdeppe; Germany (GER)	5.90 m	Renaud Lavillenie; France (FRA) Piotr Lisek; Poland (POL) Paweł Wojciechowski; Poland (POL)	5.80 m
Long jump	Greg Rutherford; Great Britain & N.I. (GBR)	8.41 m	Fabrice Lapierre; Australia (AUS)	8.24 m	Wang Jianan; China (CHN)	8.18 m
Triple jump	Christian Taylor; United States (USA)	18.21 m WL AR	Pedro Pablo Pichardo; Cuba (CUB)	17.73 m	Nelson Évora; Portugal (POR)	17.52 m
Shot put	Joe Kovacs; United States (USA)	21.93 m	David Storl; Germany (GER)	21.74 m	O'Dayne Richards; Jamaica (JAM)	21.69 m NR
Discus throw	Piotr Małachowski; Poland (POL)	67.40 m	Philip Milanov; Belgium (BEL)	66.90 m NR	Robert Urbanek; Poland (POL)	65.18 m
Hammer throw	Paweł Fajdek; Poland (POL)	80.88 m	Dilshod Nazarov; Tajikistan (TJK)	78.55 m	Wojciech Nowicki; Poland (POL)	78.55 m
Javelin throw	Julius Yego; Kenya (KEN)	92.72 m WL AR	Ihab El-Sayed; Egypt (EGY)	88.99 m	Tero Pitkämäki; Finland (FIN)	87.64 m
Decathlon	Ashton Eaton; United States (USA)	9045 pts WR	Damian Warner; Canada (CAN)	8695 pts NR	Rico Freimuth; Germany (GER)	8561 pts PB
WR world record | AR area record | CR championship record | GR games record | NR national record | OR Olympic record | PB personal best | SB season best | WL world leading (in a given season)

=== Women ===
==== Track ====
Chronology: 2011 | 2013 | 2015 | 2017 | 2019

Event	Gold		Silver		Bronze	
100 metres	Shelly-Ann Fraser-Pryce; Jamaica (JAM)	10.76	Dafne Schippers; Netherlands (NED)	10.81 NR	Tori Bowie; United States (USA)	10.86
200 metres	Dafne Schippers; Netherlands (NED)	21.63 CR AR WL	Elaine Thompson; Jamaica (JAM)	21.66 PB	Veronica Campbell-Brown; Jamaica (JAM)	21.97
400 metres	Allyson Felix; United States (USA)	49.26 WL PB	Shaunae Miller; Bahamas (BAH)	49.67 PB	Shericka Jackson; Jamaica (JAM)	49.99 PB
800 metres	Maryna Arzamasava; Belarus (BLR)	1:58.03	Melissa Bishop; Canada (CAN)	1:58.12	Eunice Jepkoech Sum; Kenya (KEN)	1:58.18
1500 metres	Genzebe Dibaba; Ethiopia (ETH)	4:08.09	Faith Kipyegon; Kenya (KEN)	4:08.96	Sifan Hassan; Netherlands (NED)	4:09.34
5000 metres	Almaz Ayana; Ethiopia (ETH)	14:26.83 CR	Senbere Teferi; Ethiopia (ETH)	14:44.07	Genzebe Dibaba; Ethiopia (ETH)	14:44.14
10,000 metres	Vivian Cheruiyot; Kenya (KEN)	31:41.31	Gelete Burka; Ethiopia (ETH)	31:41.77	Emily Infeld; United States (USA)	31:43.49
Marathon	Mare Dibaba; Ethiopia (ETH)	2:27:35	Helah Kiprop; Kenya (KEN)	2:27:36	Eunice Kirwa; Bahrain (BHR)	2:27:39
100 metres hurdles	Danielle Williams; Jamaica (JAM)	12.57 PB	Cindy Roleder; Germany (GER)	12.59 PB	Alina Talay; Belarus (BLR)	12.66 NR
400 metres hurdles	Zuzana Hejnová; Czech Republic (CZE)	53.50 WL	Shamier Little; United States (USA)	53.94	Cassandra Tate; United States (USA)	54.02
3000 metres steeplechase	Hyvin Jepkemoi; Kenya (KEN)	9:19.11	Habiba Ghribi; Tunisia (TUN)	9:19.24	Gesa Felicitas Krause; Germany (GER)	9:19.25 PB
20 kilometres walk	Liu Hong; China (CHN)	1:27:45	Lü Xiuzhi; China (CHN)	1:27:45	Lyudmyla Olyanovska; Ukraine (UKR)	1:28:13
4 × 100 metres relay	Jamaica; Veronica Campbell-Brown; Natasha Morrison; Elaine Thompson; Shelly-Ann Fraser-Pryce; Sherone Simpson*; Kerron Stewart*	41.07 CR WL	United States; English Gardner; Allyson Felix; Jenna Prandini; Jasmine Todd	41.68	Trinidad and Tobago; Kelly-Ann Baptiste; Michelle-Lee Ahye; Reyare Thomas; Semoy Hackett; Khalifa St. Fort*	42.03 NR
4 × 400 metres relay	Jamaica; Christine Day; Shericka Jackson; Stephenie Ann McPherson; Novlene Williams-Mills; Anastasia Le-Roy*; Chrisann Gordon*	3:19.13 WL	United States; Sanya Richards-Ross; Natasha Hastings; Allyson Felix; Francena McCorory; Phyllis Francis*; Jessica Beard*	3:19.44	Great Britain & N.I. Christine Ohuruogu; Anyika Onuora; Eilidh Child; Seren Bundy-Davies; Kirsten McAslan*	3:23.62
WR world record | AR area record | CR championship record | GR games record | NR national record | OR Olympic record | PB personal best | SB season best | WL world leading (in a given season) * Runners who participated in the heats only and received medals

==== Field ====
Chronology: 2011 | 2013 | 2015 | 2017 | 2019

Event	Gold		Silver		Bronze	
High jump	Maria Kuchina; Russia (RUS)	2.01 m PB	Blanka Vlašić; Croatia (CRO)	2.01 m	Anna Chicherova; Russia (RUS)	2.01 m
Pole vault	Yarisley Silva; Cuba (CUB)	4.90 m	Fabiana Murer; Brazil (BRA)	4.85 m =AR	Nikoleta Kyriakopoulou; Greece (GRE)	4.80 m
Long jump	Tianna Bartoletta; United States (USA)	7.14 m WL PB	Shara Proctor; Great Britain & N.I. (GBR)	7.07 m NR	Ivana Španović; Serbia (SRB)	7.01 m NR
Triple jump	Caterine Ibargüen; Colombia (COL)	14.90 m	Hanna Knyazyeva-Minenko; Israel (ISR)	14.78 m NR	Olga Rypakova; Kazakhstan (KAZ)	14.77 m
Shot put	Christina Schwanitz; Germany (GER)	20.37 m	Gong Lijiao; China (CHN)	20.30 m	Michelle Carter; United States (USA)	19.76 m
Discus throw	Denia Caballero; Cuba (CUB)	69.28 m	Sandra Perković; Croatia (CRO)	67.39 m	Nadine Müller; Germany (GER)	65.53 m
Hammer throw	Anita Włodarczyk; Poland (POL)	80.85 m CR	Zhang Wenxiu; China (CHN)	76.33 m	Alexandra Tavernier; France (FRA)	74.02 m
Javelin throw	Katharina Molitor; Germany (GER)	67.69 m WL PB	Lü Huihui; China (CHN)	66.13 m AR	Sunette Viljoen; South Africa (RSA)	65.79 m
Heptathlon	Jessica Ennis-Hill; Great Britain & N.I. (GBR)	6669 pts	Brianne Theisen-Eaton; Canada (CAN)	6554 pts	Laura Ikauniece-Admidiņa; Latvia (LAT)	6516 pts NR
WR world record | AR area record | CR championship record | GR games record | NR national record | OR Olympic record | PB personal best | SB season best | WL world leading (in a given season)

=== Exhibition events ===
Event	Gold		Silver		Bronze	
Masters 800 metres	David Heath; Great Britain & N.I. (GBR)	2:00.92	Gunnar Rune Durén; Sweden (SWE)	2:03.41	Michael Sherar; Canada (CAN)	2:03.61
Masters 400 metres	Sarah Louise Read Cayton; Great Britain & N.I. (GBR)	1:00.05	Virginia Corinne Mitchell; Great Britain & N.I. (GBR)	1:00.81	Elizabeth Gail Wilson; New Zealand (NZL)	1:02.54

== Medal table ==
* Host nation (China)

Rank	Nation	Gold	Silver	Bronze	Total
1	Kenya	7	6	3	16
2	Jamaica	7	2	3	12
3	United States	6	6	6	18
4	Great Britain & N.I.	4	1	2	7
5	Ethiopia	3	3	2	8
6	Poland	3	1	4	8
7	Canada	2	3	3	8
7	Germany	2	3	3	8
9	Russia	2	1	1	4
10	Cuba	2	1	0	3
11	China*	1	7	1	9
12	Netherlands	1	1	1	3
13	South Africa	1	0	2	3
14	Belarus	1	0	1	2
15	Colombia	1	0	0	1
15	Czech Republic	1	0	0	1
15	Eritrea	1	0	0	1
15	Slovakia	1	0	0	1
15	Spain	1	0	0	1
20	Australia	0	2	0	2
20	Croatia	0	2	0	2
22	Bahamas	0	1	1	2
22	Trinidad and Tobago	0	1	1	2
22	Ukraine	0	1	1	2
25	Belgium	0	1	0	1
25	Brazil	0	1	0	1
25	Egypt	0	1	0	1
25	Israel	0	1	0	1
25	Tajikistan	0	1	0	1
25	Tunisia	0	1	0	1
31	France	0	0	2	2
32	Bahrain	0	0	1	1
32	Bosnia and Herzegovina	0	0	1	1
32	Finland	0	0	1	1
32	Greece	0	0	1	1
32	Grenada	0	0	1	1
32	Japan	0	0	1	1
32	Kazakhstan	0	0	1	1
32	Latvia	0	0	1	1
32	Morocco	0	0	1	1
32	Portugal	0	0	1	1
32	Serbia	0	0	1	1
32	Uganda	0	0	1	1
Totals (43 entries)		47	48	49	144

== Participating nations ==
Two hundred and seven countries (or, more accurately, IAAF members) with a total of 1,933 athletes were entered. Of those 1,771 athletes from 205 countries actually competed (thus excluding reserve athletes and non-starters). The biggest delegation was the one from the US with 130 athletes. Two countries, Ghana and South Sudan, were set to participate, but none of their athletes showed up. The number of athletes per nation is shown in parentheses.

- Afghanistan (1)
- Albania (1)
- Algeria (14)
- Andorra (1)
- Angola (1)
- Anguilla (1)
- Antigua and Barbuda (5)
- Argentina (6)
- Armenia (1)
- Aruba (1)
- Australia (43)
- Austria (5)
- Azerbaijan (2)
- Bahamas (23)
- Bahrain (17)
- Bangladesh (1)
- Barbados (6)
- Belarus (18)
- Belgium (18)
- Belize (1)
- Benin (1)
- Bermuda (2)
- Bhutan (1)
- Bolivia (3)
- Bosnia and Herzegovina (2)
- Botswana (5)
- Brazil (53)
- British Virgin Islands (2)
- Brunei (1)
- Bulgaria (10)
- Burkina Faso (2)
- Burundi (2)
- Cambodia (1)
- Cameroon (2)
- Canada (44)
- Cape Verde (1)
- Cayman Islands (2)
- Central African Republic (1)
- Chad (1)
- Chile (6)
- China (66)
- Colombia (12)
- Comoros (1)
- Congo (1)
- Cook Islands (1)
- Costa Rica (2)
- Croatia (6)
- Cuba (24)
- Cyprus (3)
- Czech Republic (25)
- Denmark (3)
- Djibouti (3)
- Dominica (1)
- Dominican Republic (6)
- DR Congo (1)
- Ecuador (5)
- Egypt (3)
- El Salvador (2)
- Equatorial Guinea (1)
- Eritrea (9)
- Estonia (15)
- Ethiopia (32)
- Federated States of Micronesia (1)
- Fiji (2)
- Finland (17)
- France (36)
- French Polynesia (1)
- Georgia (1)
- Germany (62)
- Gibraltar (1)
- Great Britain & N.I. (59)
- Greece (10)
- Grenada (3)
- Guam (1)
- Guatemala (7)
- Guinea (1)
- Guinea-Bissau (1)
- Guyana (2)
- Haiti (1)
- Honduras (1)
- Hong Kong (1)
- Hungary (12)
- Iceland (2)
- India (16)
- Indonesia (1)
- Iran (5)
- Iraq (1)
- Ireland (14)
- Israel (4)
- Italy (30)
- Ivory Coast (4)
- Jamaica (50)
- Japan (51)
- Jordan (1)
- Kazakhstan (10)
- Kenya (52)
- Kiribati (1)
- Kosovo (1)
- Kuwait (1)
- Kyrgyzstan (1)
- Laos (1)
- Latvia (9)
- Lebanon (1)
- Lesotho (2)
- Liberia (1)
- Libya (1)
- Lithuania (11)
- Luxembourg (2)
- Macau (1)
- Macedonia (1)
- Madagascar (1)
- Malawi (1)
- Malaysia (1)
- Maldives (1)
- Mali (1)
- Malta (1)
- Mauritania (1)
- Mauritius (1)
- Mexico (5)
- Moldova (4)
- Monaco (1)
- Mongolia (3)
- Montenegro (1)
- Montserrat (1)
- Morocco (22)
- Mozambique (1)
- Myanmar (1)
- Namibia (2)
- Nauru (1)
- Nepal (1)
- Netherlands (21)
- New Zealand (14)
- Nicaragua (1)
- Nigeria (16)
- North Korea (3)
- Northern Mariana Islands (1)
- Norway (9)
- Oman (1)
- Pakistan (1)
- Palau (1)
- Palestine (2)
- Panama (3)
- Papua New Guinea (2)
- Paraguay (1)
- Peru (6)
- Philippines (1)
- Poland (48)
- Portugal (16)
- Puerto Rico (3)
- Qatar (6)
- Romania (16)
- Russia (62)
- Rwanda (1)
- Saint Kitts and Nevis (3)
- Saint Lucia (2)
- Saint Vincent and the Grenadines (1)
- Samoa (2)
- San Marino (1)
- São Tomé and Príncipe (1)
- Saudi Arabia (3)
- Senegal (1)
- Serbia (5)
- Seychelles (1)
- Sierra Leone (1)
- Singapore (1)
- Slovakia (16)
- Slovenia (8)
- Solomon Islands (1)
- Somalia (1)
- South Africa (33)
- South Korea (12)
- Spain (40)
- Sri Lanka (2)
- Sudan (3)
- Suriname (1)
- Swaziland (1)
- Sweden (24)
- Switzerland (15)
- Syria (2)
- Chinese Taipei (5)
- Tajikistan (2)
- Tanzania (4)
- Thailand (2)
- Gambia (1)
- Togo (1)
- Tonga (1)
- Trinidad and Tobago (19)
- Tunisia (4)
- Turkey (12)
- Turkmenistan (1)
- Turks and Caicos Islands (1)
- Tuvalu (1)
- Uganda (11)
- Ukraine (51)
- United Arab Emirates (3)
- United States (130)
- Uruguay (3)
- Uzbekistan (4)
- Vanuatu (1)
- Venezuela (11)
- Vietnam (1)
- U.S. Virgin Islands (2)
- Yemen (1)
- Zambia (2)
- Zimbabwe (5)

== Anti-doping ==
As part of the event, the IAAF conducted a wide-reaching anti-doping programme. This included information-led targeted tests in the months previous to the championships and testing of athletes in and outside of competition during the championships. In total, the IAAF undertook 1,405 instances of athlete doping controls in Beijing. This included 662 blood tests to inform the longitudinal athlete biological passport programme, 161 blood tests specifically directed at identifying usage of either human growth hormone and/or erythropoiesis-stimulating agents (EPO), 54 out-of-competition urine tests and 528 urine tests conducted on-site (which also incorporates 239 for EPO analysis).

As was the case since the 2005 World Championships, athletes' doping samples were stored for future analysis, which could allow retrospective disqualifications via subsequent improvements to testing technology and methods. The number of tests was a new high for the event and the largest ever conducted by a sport-specific governing body at an event. The testing was undertaken in partnership with the Chinese National Anti-Doping Agency (CHINADA). An anti-doping education programme was also conducted, which included presentations on the risks of doping and a questionnaire designed by the World Anti-Doping Agency.

Initial analysis identified two failed tests, both Kenyan women: hurdler Koki Manunga and sprinter Joy Nakhumicha Sakari. Both were disqualified immediately from the competition.

== See also ==
- 2015 IPC Athletics World Championships
