= 2015 European Athletics Team Championships Super League =

Athletics team competitions

These are the complete results of the 2015 European Team Championships Super League on 20 and 21 June 2015 in Cheboksary, Russia. As with the previous championships there were a couple of rules applying specifically to this competition, such as the limit of three attempts in the throwing events, long jump and triple jump (only the top four were allowed the fourth attempt) and the limit of four misses total in the high jump and pole vault.

== Final standings ==
| Pos | Country | Pts | Note |
|---|---|---|---|
| 1 | Russia | 360.5 | |
| 2 | Germany | 347.5 | |
| 3 | France | 319.5 | |
| 4 | Poland | 317 | |
| 5 | Great Britain | 292 | |
| 6 | Italy | 289 | |
| 7 | Ukraine | 281.5 | |
| 8 | Spain | 231.5 | |
| 9 | Belarus | 217 | |
| 10 | Sweden | 188 | Relegation to the 2017 First League |
| 11 | Finland | 150.5 | Relegation to the 2017 First League |
| 12 | Norway | 122 | Relegation to the 2017 First League |

== Men ==
=== 100 metres ===
Wind:
Heat 1: -3.4 m/s
Heat 2: -1.7 m/s

| Rank | Heat | Lane | Name | Nationality | React | Time | Notes | Points |
|---|---|---|---|---|---|---|---|---|
| 1 | 2 | 5 | Christophe Lemaître | France | 0.140 | 10.26 | | 12 |
| 2 | 2 | 4 | Richard Kilty | Great Britain | 0.130 | 10.35 | | 11 |
| 3 | 2 | 6 | Sven Knipphals | Germany | 0.158 | 10.50 | | 10 |
| 4 | 1 | 5 | Massimiliano Ferraro | Italy | 0.170 | 10.56 | | 9 |
| 5 | 2 | 7 | Vitaliy Korzh | Ukraine | 0.156 | 10.61 | | 8 |
| 6 | 2 | 2 | Aleksandr Brednev | Russia | 0.181 | 10.64 | | 7 |
| 7 | 1 | 2 | Tom Kling-Baptiste | Sweden | 0.153 | 10.69 | SB | 6 |
| 8 | 1 | 4 | Przemysław Słowikowski | Poland | 0.145 | 10.75 | | 5 |
| 9 | 1 | 6 | Salum Ageze Kashafali | Norway | 0.171 | 10.78 | | 4 |
| 10 | 1 | 7 | Samuli Samuelsson | Finland | 0.209 | 10.85 | | 3 |
| 11 | 1 | 3 | Illia Siratsiuk | Belarus | 0.154 | 10.88 | | 2 |
| 12 | 2 | 3 | Ángel David Rodríguez | Spain | 0.189 | 17.39 | | 1 |

=== 200 metres ===
Wind:
Heat 1: m/s
Heat 2: m/s

| Rank | Heat | Lane | Name | Nationality | React | Time | Notes | Points |
|---|---|---|---|---|---|---|---|---|
| 1 | 1 | 5 | Serhiy Smelyk | Ukraine | | 20.45 | SB | 12 |
| 2 | 2 | 3 | Danny Talbot | Great Britain | | 20.62 | SB | 11 |
| 3 | 1 | 6 | Enrico Demonte | Italy | | 20.67 | SB | 10 |
| 4 | 1 | 4 | Johan Wissman | Sweden | | 20.81 | | 8.5 |
| 4 | 2 | 5 | Karol Zalewski | Poland | | 20.81 | | 8.5 |
| 6 | 2 | 7 | Bruno Hortelano | Spain | | 20.88 | | 7 |
| 7 | 2 | 4 | Christophe Lemaître | France | | 20.92 | | 6 |
| 8 | 2 | 6 | Robin Erewa | Germany | | 20.97 | | 5 |
| 9 | 1 | 2 | Samuli Samuelsson | Finland | | 21.08 | | 4 |
| 10 | 1 | 7 | Illia Siratsiuk | Belarus | | 21.11 | PB | 3 |
| 11 | 1 | 3 | Even Meinseth | Norway | | 21.13 | PB | 2 |
| 12 | 2 | 2 | Denis Ogarkov | Russia | | 21.45 | | 1 |

=== 400 metres ===
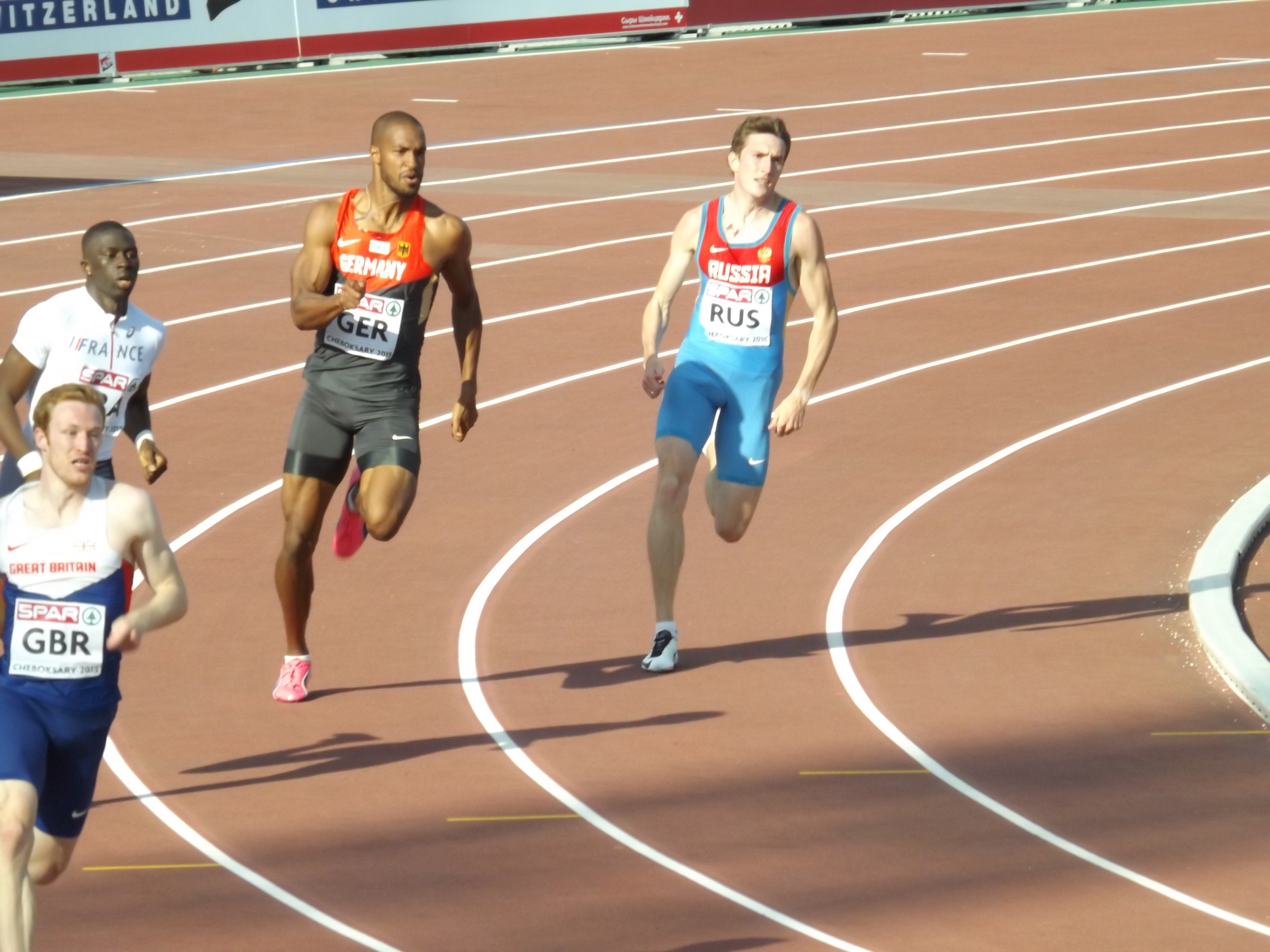
Heat 2

| Rank | Heat | Lane | Name | Nationality | React | Time | Notes | Points |
|---|---|---|---|---|---|---|---|---|
| 1 | 2 | 5 | Jarryd Dunn | Great Britain | 0.164 | 45.09 | PB | 12 |
| 2 | 2 | 4 | Mame-Ibra Anne | France | 0.187 | 45.26 | PB | 11 |
| 3 | 2 | 7 | Aliaksandr Linnik | Belarus | 0.163 | 45.43 | NR | 10 |
| 4 | 2 | 2 | Pavel Ivashko | Russia | 0.164 | 45.48 | SB | 9 |
| 5 | 2 | 6 | Vitaliy Butrym | Ukraine | 0.168 | 45.73 | PB | 8 |
| 6 | 2 | 3 | Kamghe Gaba | Germany | 0.152 | 46.32 | | 7 |
| 7 | 1 | 4 | Karsten Warholm | Norway | 0.172 | 46.40 | | 6 |
| 8 | 1 | 7 | Samuel García | Spain | 0.170 | 46.75 | SB | 5 |
| 9 | 1 | 5 | Davide Manenti | Italy | 0.190 | 46.84 | | 4 |
| 10 | 1 | 6 | Kacper Kozłowski | Poland | 0.159 | 46.92 | | 3 |
| 11 | 1 | 2 | Alexander Nordkvist | Sweden | 0.183 | 48.25 | | 2 |
| 12 | 1 | 3 | Jani Koskela | Finland | 0.159 | 48.36 | | 1 |

=== 800 metres ===
| Rank | Name | Nationality | Time | Notes | Points |
|---|---|---|---|---|---|
| 1 | Giordano Benedetti | Italy | 1:45.11 | CR | 12 |
| 2 | Pierre-Ambroise Bosse | France | 1:45.14 | | 11 |
| 3 | Adam Kszczot | Poland | 1:45.84 | | 10 |
| 4 | Konstantin Tolokonnikov | Russia | 1:46.42 | PB | 9 |
| 5 | Stanislav Maslov | Ukraine | 1:46.85 | PB | 8 |
| 6 | Kalle Berglund | Sweden | 1:46.85 | PB | 7 |
| 7 | Robin Schembera | Germany | 1:47.20 | | 6 |
| 8 | Kevin López | Spain | 1:47.60 | | 5 |
| 9 | Guy Learmonth | Great Britain | 1:47.84 | | 4 |
| 10 | Thomas Roth | Norway | 1:48.01 | | 3 |
| 11 | Ville Lampinen | Finland | 1:48.44 | PB | 2 |
| 12 | Yan Sloma | Belarus | 1:48.45 | PB | 1 |

=== 1500 metres ===
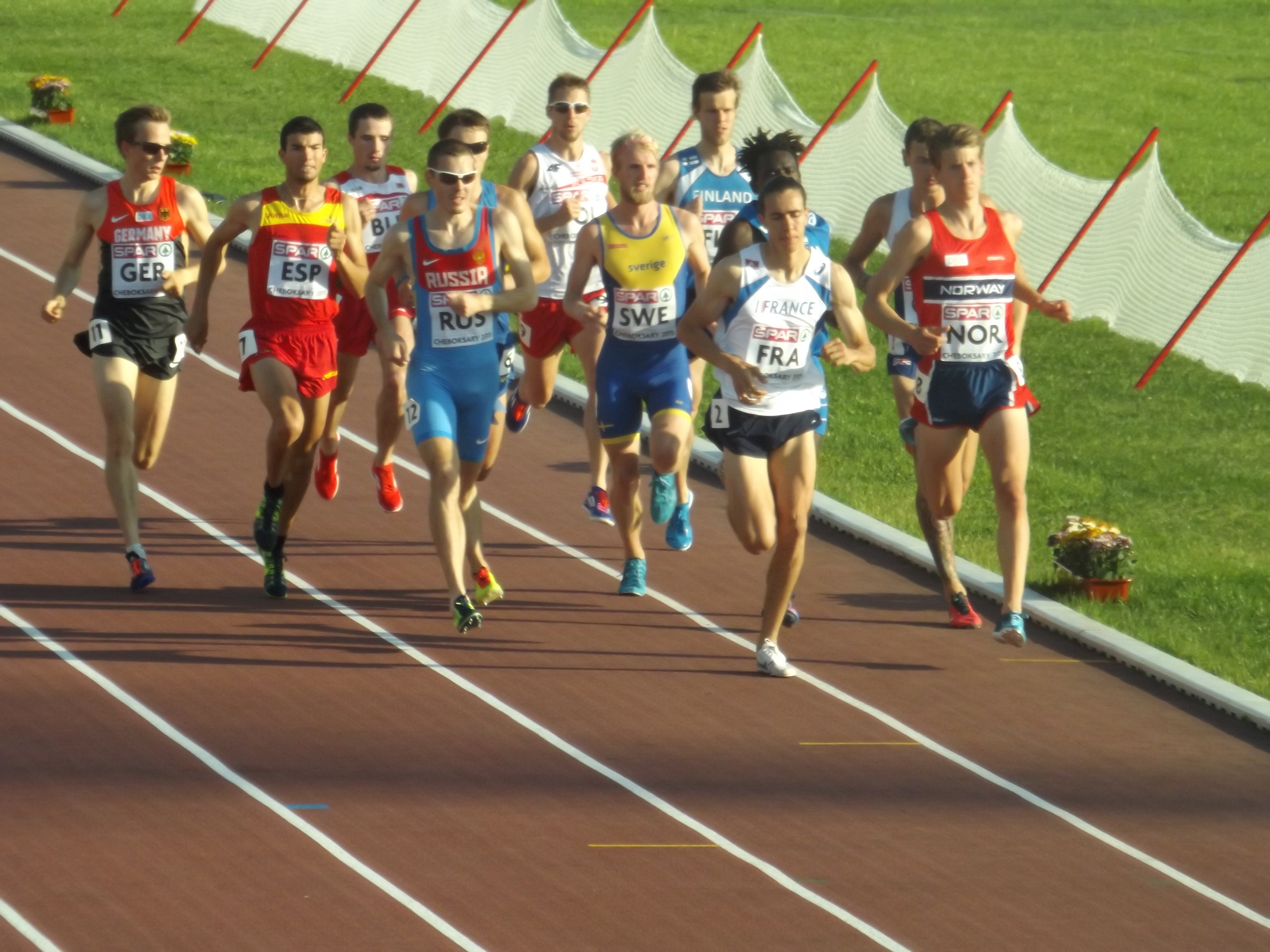

| Rank | Name | Nationality | Time | Notes | Points |
|---|---|---|---|---|---|
| 1 | Valentin Smirnov | Russia | 3:52.03 | | 12 |
| 2 | Marcin Lewandowski | Poland | 3:52.06 | | 11 |
| 3 | Oli Aitchison | Great Britain | 3:52.33 | | 10 |
| 4 | Florian Orth | Germany | 3:52.56 | | 9 |
| 5 | Stanislav Maslov | Ukraine | 3:52.58 | | 8 |
| 6 | Adel Mechaal | Spain | 3:52.69 | | 7 |
| 7 | Snorre Holtan Løken | Norway | 3:52.88 | | 6 |
| 8 | Samir Dahmani | France | 3:53.06 | | 5 |
| 9 | Joao Capistrano Bussotti Neves Junior | Italy | 3:53.06 | | 4 |
| 10 | Elmar Engholm | Sweden | 3:53.90 | | 3 |
| 11 | Siarhei Platonau | Belarus | 3:54.21 | | 2 |
| 12 | Ilari Piipponen | Finland | 3:55.18 | | 1 |

=== 3000 metres ===
| Rank | Name | Nationality | Time | Notes | Points |
|---|---|---|---|---|---|
| 1 | Richard Ringer | Germany | 8:34.35 | | 12 |
| 2 | Roberto Alaiz | Spain | 8:35.07 | | 11 |
| 3 | Andrew Butchart | Great Britain | 8:35.75 | | 10 |
| 4 | Yegor Nikolayev | Russia | 8:35.82 | | 9 |
| 5 | Krzysztof Żebrowski | Poland | 8:36.52 | | 8 |
| 6 | Bryan Cantero | France | 8:37.87 | | 7 |
| 7 | Ivan Strebkov | Ukraine | 8:38.28 | | 6 |
| 8 | Siarhei Platonau | Belarus | 8:38.86 | | 5 |
| 9 | Stefano La Rosa | Italy | 8:39.58 | | 4 |
| 10 | Erik Udø Pedersen | Norway | 8:40.18 | | 3 |
| 11 | Anders Lindahl | Finland | 8:44.65 | | 2 |
| 12 | Johan Hydén | Sweden | 8:48.29 | | 1 |

=== 5000 metres ===
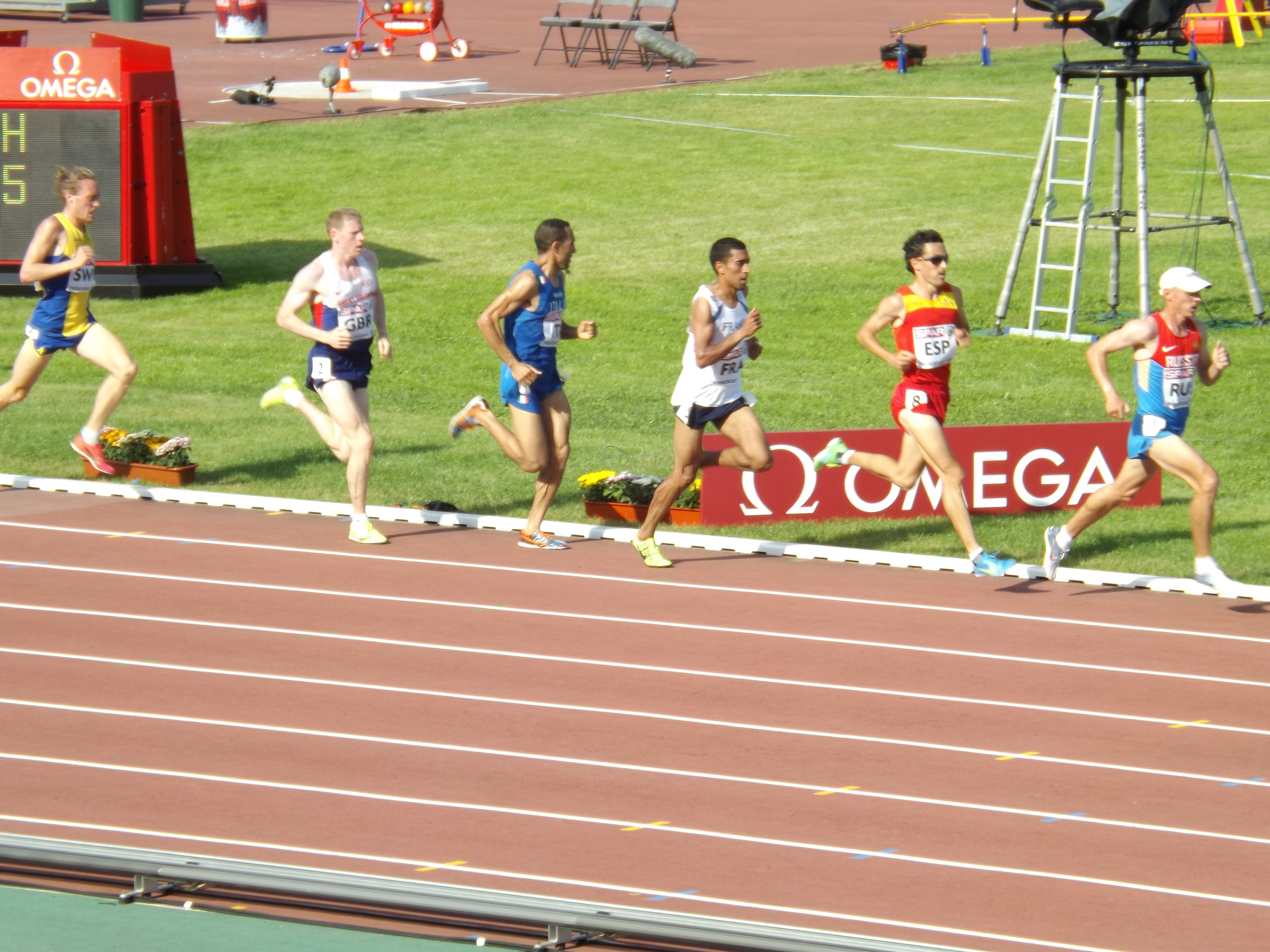

| Rank | Name | Nationality | Time | Notes | Points |
|---|---|---|---|---|---|
| 1 | Mourad Amdouni | France | 14:04.63 | | 12 |
| 2 | Jesús España | Spain | 14:05.09 | | 11 |
| 3 | Andy Vernon | Great Britain | 14:05.85 | | 10 |
| 4 | Anatoliy Rybakov | Russia | 14:07.48 | | 9 |
| 5 | Jamel Chatbi | Italy | 14:16.54 | | 8 |
| 6 | Mikael Ekvall | Sweden | 14:21.03 | | 7 |
| 7 | Volodymyr Kyts | Ukraine | 14:29.19 | | 6 |
| 8 | Mateusz Demczyszak | Poland | 14:30.21 | | 5 |
| 9 | Sondre Nordstad Moen | Norway | 14:31.25 | | 4 |
| 10 | Marcel Fehr | Germany | 14:33.67 | | 3 |
| 11 | Arttu Vattulainen | Finland | 14:44.08 | | 2 |
| 12 | Artsiom Lohish | Belarus | 15:09.00 | | 1 |

=== 3000 metres steeplechase ===
| Rank | Name | Nationality | Time | Notes | Points |
|---|---|---|---|---|---|
| 1 | Krystian Zalewski | Poland | 8:37.51 | | 12 |
| 2 | Nikolay Chavkin | Russia | 8:39.39 | | 11 |
| 3 | Yuri Floriani | Italy | 8:40.47 | | 10 |
| 4 | Martin Grau | Germany | 8:42.58 | | 9 |
| 5 | Janne Ukonmaanaho | Finland | 8:43.67 | | 8 |
| 6 | Fernando Carro | Spain | 8:44.46 | | 7 |
| 7 | Vadym Slobodenyuk | Ukraine | 8:44.93 | | 6 |
| 8 | Daniel Lundgren | Sweden | 8:46.73 | | 5 |
| 9 | Yoann Kowal | France | 8:51.85 | | 4 |
| 10 | Zak Seddon | Great Britain | 8:56.57 | | 3 |
| 11 | Illia Slavinski | Belarus | 8:59.09 | | 2 |
| 12 | Snorre Holtan Løken | Norway | 9:03.07 | | 1 |

=== 110 metres hurdles ===
Wind:
Heat 1: m/s
Heat 2: m/s

| Rank | Heat | Lane | Name | Nationality | React | Time | Notes | Points |
|---|---|---|---|---|---|---|---|---|
| 1 | 2 | 6 | Sergey Shubenkov | Russia | | 13.22 | SB | 12 |
| 2 | 2 | 5 | Pascal Martinot-Lagarde | France | | 13.42 | | 11 |
| 3 | 2 | 7 | Lawrence Clarke | Great Britain | | 13.64 | | 10 |
| 4 | 2 | 4 | Gregor Traber | Germany | | 13.74 | | 9 |
| 5 | 1 | 6 | Hassane Fofana | Italy | | 13.78 | | 8 |
| 6 | 1 | 4 | Damian Czykier | Poland | | 13.78 | =SB | 7 |
| 7 | 2 | 2 | Yidiel Contreras | Spain | | 13.85 | | 6 |
| 8 | 2 | 3 | Maksim Lynsha | Belarus | | 13.89 | | 5 |
| 9 | 1 | 5 | Elmo Lakka | Finland | | 13.98 | | 4 |
| 10 | 1 | 2 | Serhiy Kopanayko | Ukraine | | 14.17 | | 3 |
| 11 | 1 | 7 | Alexander Brorsson | Sweden | | 14.27 | | 2 |
| 12 | 1 | 3 | Vladimir Vukicevic | Norway | | 14.53 | | 1 |

=== 400 metres hurdles ===
| Rank | Heat | Lane | Name | Nationality | React | Time | Notes | Points |
|---|---|---|---|---|---|---|---|---|
| 1 | 2 | 6 | Denis Kudryavtsev | Russia | 0.176 | 48.66 | CR | 12 |
| 2 | 2 | 4 | Patryk Dobek | Poland | 0.191 | 49.04 | PB | 11 |
| 3 | 2 | 7 | Leonardo Capotosti | Italy | 0.200 | 49.93 | PB | 10 |
| 4 | 1 | 5 | Oskari Mörö | Finland | 0.154 | 50.07 | SB | 9 |
| 5 | 2 | 3 | Sebastian Rodger | Great Britain | 0.183 | 50.10 | | 8 |
| 6 | 1 | 4 | Diego Cabello | Spain | 0.170 | 50.22 | SB | 7 |
| 7 | 1 | 6 | Georg Fleischhauer | Germany | 0.156 | 50.31 | SB | 6 |
| 8 | 2 | 2 | Mickaël François | France | 0.193 | 50.37 | | 5 |
| 9 | 2 | 5 | Stanislav Melnykov | Ukraine | 0.205 | 50.47 | | 4 |
| 10 | 1 | 7 | Mikita Yakauleu | Belarus | 0.174 | 51.02 | SB | 3 |
| 11 | 1 | 3 | Øyvind Kjerpeset | Norway | 0.154 | 51.21 | | 2 |
| 12 | 1 | 2 | Jonathan Carbe | Sweden | 0.157 | 51.89 | | 1 |

=== 4 × 100 metres relay ===
| Rank | Heat | Lane | Nation | Athletes | React | Time | Notes | Points |
|---|---|---|---|---|---|---|---|---|
| 1 | 2 | 5 | Great Britain | Richard Kilty, Danny Talbot, James Ellington, Andrew Robertson | 0.148 | 38.21 | CR | 12 |
| 2 | 2 | 4 | France | Pierre Vincent, Christophe Lemaitre, Pierre-Alexis Pessonneaux, Emmanuel Biron | 0.169 | 38.34 | | 11 |
| 3 | 1 | 4 | Italy | Massimiliano Ferraro, Enrico Demonte, Davide Manenti, Delmas Obou | 0.234 | 38.71 | | 10 |
| 4 | 2 | 7 | Germany | Aleixio Platini Menga, Sven Knipphals, Alexander Kosenkow, Robin Erewa | 0.156 | 38.78 | | 9 |
| 5 | 2 | 2 | Ukraine | Emil Ibrahimov, Serhiy Smelyk, Igor Bodrov, Vitaliy Korzh | 0.161 | 38.95 | | 8 |
| 6 | 1 | 7 | Sweden | Alexander Brorsson, Johan Wissman, Tom Kling-Baptiste, Joel Groth | 0.160 | 39.20 | | 7 |
| 7 | 2 | 6 | Russia | Dmitriy Lopin, Aleksandr Brednev, Denis Ogarkov, Aleksandr Yefimov | 0.162 | 39.24 | | 6 |
| 8 | 2 | 3 | Poland | Adam Pawłowski, Przemysław Słowikowski, Artur Zaczek, Kamil Kryński | 0.181 | 39.30 | | 5 |
| 9 | 1 | 6 | Spain | Eduard Viles, Sergio Ruiz, Bruno Hortelano, Arian Olmos Tellez | 0.197 | 39.40 | | 4 |
| 10 | 1 | 3 | Finland | Elmo Lakka, Otto Ahlfors, Samuli Samuelsson, Ville Myllymäki | 0.154 | 39.45 | | 3 |
| 11 | 1 | 5 | Belarus | Yahor Papou, Siarhei Pustabeu, Illia Siratsiuk, Aliaksandr Linnik | 0.192 | 39.67 | | 2 |
| | 1 | 2 | Norway | Jonas Tapani Halonen, Even Meinseth, Even Pettersen, Salum Ageze Kashafali | 0.165 | DSQ | | 0 |

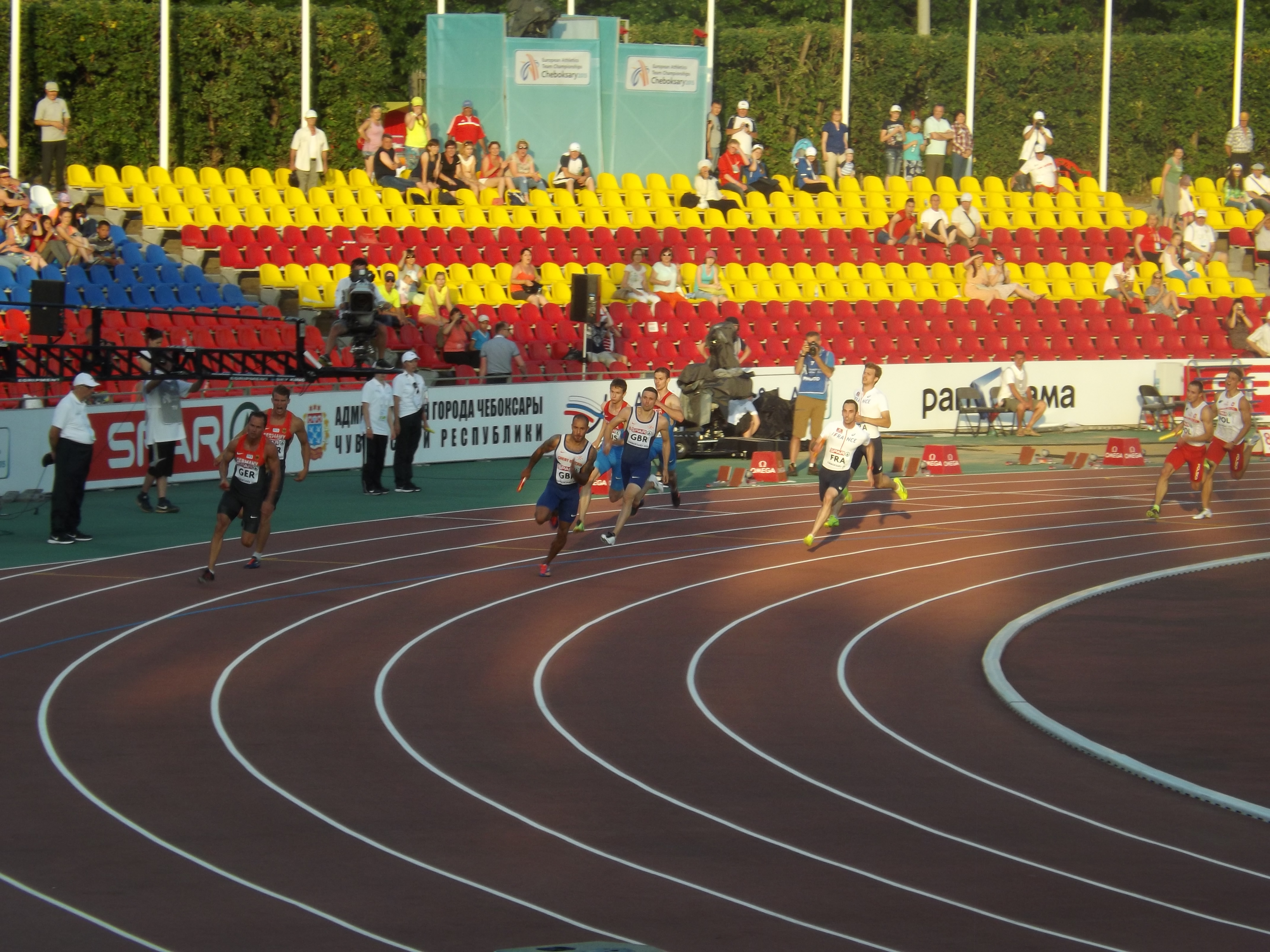
Heat 2 – second changeover

=== 4 × 400 metres relay ===
| Rank | Heat | Nation | Athletes | Time | Notes | Points |
|---|---|---|---|---|---|---|
| 1 | 2 | France | Mame-Ibra Anne, Teddy Venel, Mamoudou Hanne, Thomas Jordier | 3:00.47 | CR | 12 |
| 2 | 2 | Great Britain | Rabah Yousif, Delano Williams, Conrad Williams, Richard Buck | 3:00.54 | | 11 |
| 3 | 2 | Poland | Łukasz Krawczuk, Michał Pietrzak, Rafał Omelko, Patryk Dobek | 3:01.24 | | 10 |
| 4 | 2 | Russia | Artyom Denmukhametov, Pavel Trenikhin, Lev Mosin, Pavel Ivashko | 3:01.71 | | 9 |
| 5 | 2 | Germany | Thomas Schneider, Kamghe Gaba, Eric Krüger, Johannes Trefz | 3:03.55 | | 8 |
| 6 | 1 | Ukraine | Nazariy Dzyubenko, Yevhen Hutsol, Volodymyr Burakov, Vitaliy Butrym | 3:05.16 | | 7 |
| 7 | 1 | Spain | Iñigo Pérez, Samuel García, Lucas Bua, Pau Fradera | 3:06.35 | | 6 |
| 8 | 2 | Italy | Davide Re, Francesco Cappellin, Eusebio Haliti, Davide Manenti | 3:06.71 | | 5 |
| 9 | 1 | Sweden | Felix François, Dennis Forsman, Alexander Nordkvist, Jonathan Carbe | 3:08.83 | | 4 |
| 10 | 1 | Belarus | Aliaksandr Krasouski, Mikita Yakauleu, Maksim Lopauka, Piotr Khadasevich | 3:09.17 | | 3 |
| 11 | 1 | Norway | Mauritz Kåshagen, Josh-Kevin Ramirez Talm, Simen Sigurdsen, Karsten Warholm | 3:10.65 | | 2 |
| 12 | 1 | Finland | Jani Koskela, Oskari Mörö, Petteri Monni, Erik Back | 3:11.60 | | 1 |

=== High jump ===
| Rank | Name | Nationality | 1.99 | 2.04 | 2.09 | 2.14 | 2.18 | 2.22 | 2.25 | 2.28 | 2.31 | 2.33 | 2.35 | Mark | Notes | Points |
|---|---|---|---|---|---|---|---|---|---|---|---|---|---|---|---|---|
| 1 | Daniyil Tsyplakov | Russia | – | – | – | o | o | o | o | o | xo | xo | xf | 2.33 | =PB | 12 |
| 2 | Marco Fassinotti | Italy | – | – | – | – | o | o | o | o | xx– | x | | 2.28 | | 11 |
| 3 | Mateusz Przybylko | Germany | – | o | o | o | xo | o | xxo | x | | | | 2.25 | | 10 |
| 4 | Artsem Naumovich | Belarus | – | – | o | o | xo | o | xxx | | | | | 2.22 | | 9 |
| 5 | Mickaël Hanany | France | – | – | o | o | o | xo | xxx | | | | | 2.22 | | 8 |
| 6 | Dmytro Yakovenko | Ukraine | – | o | o | xo | o | xo | xx | | | | | 2.22 | | 6.5 |
| 6 | Robbie Grabarz | Great Britain | – | – | o | o | xo | xo | xx | | | | | 2.22 | | 6.5 |
| 8 | Miguel Ángel Sancho | Spain | – | o | o | o | o | xxo | xx | | | | | 2.22 | | 5 |
| 9 | Mehdi Katib | Sweden | – | o | o | o | xxo | xx | | | | | | 2.18 | SB | 4 |
| 10 | Sylwester Bednarek | Poland | – | o | o | o | xxx | | | | | | | 2.14 | | 3 |
| 11 | Jussi Viita | Finland | – | o | o | xxx | | | | | | | | 2.09 | | 2 |
| 12 | Kristoffer Nilsen | Norway | o | o | xxx | | | | | | | | | 2.04 | | 1 |

=== Pole vault ===
| Rank | Name | Nationality | 4.75 | 4.95 | 5.15 | 5.30 | 5.45 | 5.55 | 5.65 | 5.75 | 5.80 | 5.85 | 5.90 | 6.02 | Mark | Notes | Points |
|---|---|---|---|---|---|---|---|---|---|---|---|---|---|---|---|---|---|
| 1 | Renaud Lavillenie | France | – | – | – | – | – | – | – | x– | x– | o | – | xxx | 5.85 | | 12 |
| 2 | Raphael Holzdeppe | Germany | – | – | – | – | – | o | o | o | – | xxo | xx | | 5.85 | SB | 11 |
| 3 | Piotr Lisek | Poland | – | – | – | o | xo | o | x– | o | o | xx | | | 5.80 | SB | 10 |
| 4 | Claudio Michel Stecchi | Italy | – | xo | o | xxo | o | x | | | | | | | 5.45 | SB | 9 |
| 5 | Eirik Greibrokk Dolve | Norway | – | xo | xo | o | xo | x | | | | | | | 5.45 | PB | 7.5 |
| 5 | Aleksandr Gripich | Russia | – | – | – | xxo | xo | x | | | | | | | 5.45 | | 7.5 |
| 7 | Ivan Yeryomin | Ukraine | – | o | o | o | xxx | | | | | | | | 5.30 | =SB | 6 |
| 8 | Stanislau Tsivonchyk | Belarus | – | xo | – | xo | xx | | | | | | | | 5.30 | SB | 5 |
| 9 | Jax Thoirs | Great Britain | – | – | o | xxo | xx | | | | | | | | 5.30 | | 4 |
| 10 | Igor Bychkov | Spain | – | xo | – | xxo | x | | | | | | | | 5.30 | | 3 |
| 11 | Carl Stenson | Sweden | o | – | o | xxx | | | | | | | | | 5.15 | SB | 2 |
| 12 | Jouni Marjaniemi | Finland | – | – | xxo | xx | | | | | | | | | 5.15 | | 1 |

=== Long jump ===
| Rank | Name | Nationality | #1 | #2 | #3 | #4 | Mark | Notes | Points |
|---|---|---|---|---|---|---|---|---|---|
| 1 | Aleksandr Menkov | Russia | 8.14 | x | 8.26 | x | 8.26 | | 12 |
| 2 | Kafétien Gomis | France | x | 7.86 | 7.91 | 8.26 | 8.26 | PB | 11 |
| 3 | Alyn Camara | Germany | 8.11 | x | x | 7.84 | 8.11 | | 10 |
| 4 | Andreas Otterling | Sweden | 7.98 | x | x | 7.78 | 7.98 | | 9 |
| 5 | Taras Neledva | Ukraine | x | 7.75 | x | | 7.75 | | 8 |
| 6 | Jean Marie Okutu | Spain | 7.69 | 7.68 | 7.53 | | 7.69 | | 7 |
| 7 | Kristian Pulli | Finland | 7.49 | 7.63 | 7.69 | | 7.69 | | 6 |
| 8 | Dan Bramble | Great Britain | x | x | 7.61 | | 7.61 | | 5 |
| 9 | Tomasz Jaszczuk | Poland | 7.20 | 7.51 | 7.60 | | 7.60 | | 4 |
| 10 | Artsem Bandarenka | Belarus | 7.27 | 7.39 | x | | 7.39 | | 3 |
| 11 | Emanuele Catania | Italy | x | 7.39 | 7.31 | | 7.39 | | 2 |
| 12 | Karsten Warholm | Norway | 7.16 | 7.12 | 7.11 | | 7.16 | | 1 |

=== Triple jump ===
| Rank | Name | Nationality | #1 | #2 | #3 | #4 | Mark | Notes | Points |
|---|---|---|---|---|---|---|---|---|---|
| 1 | Fabrizio Donato | Italy | 17.11 | x | x | – | 17.11 | | 12 |
| 2 | Aleksey Fyodorov | Russia | 16.48 | 16.82 | 16.53 | 16.92 | 16.92 | | 11 |
| 3 | Simo Lipsanen | Finland | 16.47 | 16.04 | 16.62 | 15.88 | 16.62 | | 10 |
| 4 | Maksim Nesterenka | Belarus | 16.39 | 16.59 | x | x | 16.59 | PB | 9 |
| 5 | Sergio Solanas | Spain | 16.26 | 16.57 | 16.35 | | 16.57 | | 8 |
| 6 | Marcel Kornhardt | Germany | 16.12 | 16.56 | 16.19 | | 16.56 | | 7 |
| 7 | Jean-Marc Pontvianne | France | x | 16.42 | 15.97 | | 16.42 | | 6 |
| 8 | Viktor Yastrebov | Ukraine | 16.30 | x | x | | 16.30 | | 5 |
| 9 | Adrian Świderski | Poland | 16.24 | x | x | | 16.24 | | 4 |
| 10 | Isak Persson | Sweden | 16.23 | x | x | | 16.23 | | 3 |
| 11 | Dan Bramble | Great Britain | x | x | 15.92 | | 15.92 | | 2 |
| 12 | Joakim Urdahl | Norway | 14.01 | f | | | 14.01 | | 1 |

=== Shot put ===
| Rank | Name | Nationality | #1 | #2 | #3 | #4 | Mark | Notes | Points |
|---|---|---|---|---|---|---|---|---|---|
| 1 | David Storl | Germany | 21.12 | x | x | 21.20 | 21.20 | | 12 |
| 2 | Tomasz Majewski | Poland | 19.70 | x | 20.23 | x | 20.23 | | 11 |
| 3 | Pavel Lyzhyn | Belarus | 20.15 | 19.79 | x | x | 20.15 | | 10 |
| 4 | Gaëtan Bucki | France | 19.24 | 19.45 | 19.38 | x | 19.45 | | 9 |
| 5 | Aleksandr Lesnoy | Russia | 19.10 | 19.42 | x | | 19.42 | | 8 |
| 6 | Borja Vivas | Spain | 19.03 | x | 19.26 | | 19.26 | | 7 |
| 7 | Daniele Secci | Italy | 18.00 | 18.68 | 18.26 | | 18.68 | | 6 |
| 8 | Arttu Kangas | Finland | x | 18.67 | 18.76 | | 18.76 | | 5 |
| 9 | Daniel Ståhl | Sweden | x | x | 17.56 | | 17.56 | SB | 4 |
| 10 | Dmytro Savytskyy | Ukraine | 16.92 | x | 17.40 | | 17.40 | | 3 |
| 11 | Zane Duquemin | Great Britain | 16.53 | 17.36 | 17.19 | | 17.36 | | 2 |
| 12 | Sven Martin Skagestad | Norway | 16.96 | x | 16.11 | | 16.96 | | 1 |

=== Discus throw ===
| Rank | Name | Nationality | #1 | #2 | #3 | #4 | Mark | Notes | Points |
|---|---|---|---|---|---|---|---|---|---|
| 1 | Robert Urbanek | Poland | 62.26 | 63.03 | 62.64 | 63.03 | 63.03 | | 12 |
| 2 | Martin Wierig | Germany | 58.99 | x | x | 60.23 | 60.23 | | 11 |
| 3 | Frank Casañas | Spain | 58.82 | x | x | 60.01 | 60.01 | SB | 10 |
| 4 | Hannes Kirchler | Italy | 52.64 | 58.05 | 58.98 | 59.03 | 59.03 | | 9 |
| 5 | Lolassonn Djouhan | France | 58.43 | x | 57.43 | | 58.43 | | 8 |
| 6 | Gleb Sidorchenko | Russia | x | 58.21 | x | | 58.21 | | 7 |
| 7 | Sven Martin Skagestad | Norway | 56.83 | x | x | | 56.83 | | 6 |
| 8 | Zane Duquemin | Great Britain | 55.28 | 55.42 | x | | 55.42 | | 5 |
| 9 | Valery Halubkovich | Belarus | 43.33 | x | 54.80 | | 54.80 | | 4 |
| 10 | Roman Ryzhyy | Ukraine | 52.75 | 53.79 | 52.84 | | 53.79 | | 3 |
| 11 | Pyry Niskala | Finland | 46.83 | 51.46 | x | | 51.46 | | 2 |
| | Daniel Ståhl | Sweden | x | x | x | | NM | | 0 |

=== Hammer throw ===
| Rank | Name | Nationality | #1 | #2 | #3 | #4 | Mark | Notes | Points |
|---|---|---|---|---|---|---|---|---|---|
| 1 | Paweł Fajdek | Poland | 79.96 | 81.64 | x | 80.73 | 81.64 | CR | 12 |
| 2 | Nick Miller | Great Britain | 75.53 | 75.91 | 73.94 | x | 75.91 | | 11 |
| 3 | Yevhen Vynohradov | Ukraine | 73.89 | x | 72.90 | 75.91 | 75.91 | | 10 |
| 4 | Sergey Litvinov | Russia | 74.88 | 75.45 | x | 73.15 | 75.45 | | 9 |
| 5 | Marco Lingua | Italy | x | 72.98 | x | | 72.98 | | 8 |
| 6 | Aleh Dubitski | Belarus | x | x | 72.83 | | 72.83 | | 7 |
| 7 | Jérôme Bortoluzzi | France | 72.35 | 72.67 | 72.16 | | 72.67 | | 6 |
| 8 | Eivind Henriksen | Norway | 69.65 | 71.20 | 70.76 | | 71.20 | | 5 |
| 9 | Javier Cienfuegos | Spain | 70.77 | 71.05 | x | | 71.05 | | 4 |
| 10 | Tuomas Seppänen | Finland | 68.90 | 69.89 | 70.94 | | 70.94 | | 3 |
| 11 | Oskar Vestlund | Sweden | x | x | 67.18 | | 67.18 | | 2 |
| 12 | Paul Hützen | Germany | 64.56 | x | 64.42 | | 64.56 | | 1 |

=== Javelin throw ===
| Rank | Name | Nationality | #1 | #2 | #3 | #4 | Mark | Notes | Points |
|---|---|---|---|---|---|---|---|---|---|
| 1 | Tero Pitkämäki | Finland | 81.71 | x | 80.10 | 84.44 | 84.44 | | 12 |
| 2 | Johannes Vetter | Germany | 73.38 | 71.26 | 78.97 | 71.54 | 78.97 | | 11 |
| 3 | Valeriy Iordan | Russia | x | 73.46 | 78.32 | 77.13 | 78.32 | | 10 |
| 4 | Norbert Bonvecchio | Italy | 77.33 | 75.74 | x | 72.76 | 77.33 | | 9 |
| 5 | Hubert Chmielak | Poland | 76.87 | x | x | | 76.87 | | 8 |
| 6 | Uladzimir Kazlou | Belarus | 74.03 | 76.26 | 72.18 | | 76.26 | | 7 |
| 7 | Gabriel Wallin | Sweden | 71.72 | 74.89 | 75.99 | | 75.99 | | 6 |
| 8 | Oleksandr Pyatnytsya | Ukraine | x | 71.75 | 69.00 | | 71.75 | | 5 |
| 9 | Håkon Løvenskiold Kveseth | Norway | 64.27 | 69.62 | 71.53 | | 71.53 | | 4 |
| 10 | Killian Durechou | France | 61.71 | 64.73 | 67.68 | | 67.68 | | 3 |
| 11 | Bonne Buwembo | Great Britain | 66.41 | 61.33 | 67.51 | | 67.51 | | 2 |
| 12 | Pablo Bugallo | Spain | 64.92 | x | 64.44 | | 64.92 | | 1 |

== Women ==
=== 100 metres ===
Wind:
Heat 1: -4,3 m/s
Heat 2: -1,4 m/s

| Rank | Heat | Lane | Name | Nationality | React | Time | Notes | Points |
|---|---|---|---|---|---|---|---|---|
| 1 | 2 | 6 | Asha Philip | Great Britain | 0.137 | 11.27 | | 12 |
| 2 | 2 | 7 | Nataliya Pohrebnyak | Ukraine | 0.155 | 11.29 | | 11 |
| 3 | 2 | 3 | Ewa Swoboda | Poland | 0.155 | 11.48 | | 10 |
| 4 | 2 | 4 | Tatjana Pinto | Germany | 0.197 | 11.52 | | 9 |
| 5 | 2 | 5 | Yelizaveta Demirova | Russia | 0.140 | 11.62 | | 8 |
| 6 | 2 | 2 | Jessica Paoletta | Italy | 0.184 | 11.76 | | 7 |
| 7 | 1 | 5 | Ezinne Okparaebo | Norway | 0.160 | 11.79 | | 6 |
| 8 | 1 | 3 | Alina Talay | Belarus | 0.161 | 11.98 | | 5 |
| 9 | 1 | 6 | Cristina Lara | Spain | 0.151 | 12.12 | | 4 |
| 10 | 1 | 4 | Jennifer Galais | France | 0.216 | 12.12 | | 3 |
| 11 | 1 | 7 | Daniella Busk | Sweden | 0.174 | 12.13 | | 2 |
| 12 | 1 | 2 | Milja Thureson | Finland | 0.176 | 12.15 | | 1 |

=== 200 metres ===
Wind:
Heat 1: m/s
Heat 2: m/s

| Rank | Heat | Lane | Name | Nationality | React | Time | Notes | Points |
|---|---|---|---|---|---|---|---|---|
| 1 | 2 | 4 | Nataliya Pohrebnyak | Ukraine | | 22.76 | PB | 12 |
| 2 | 2 | 6 | Dina Asher-Smith | Great Britain | | 23.16 | | 11 |
| 3 | 2 | 5 | Yekaterina Smirnova | Russia | | 23.29 | | 10 |
| 4 | 2 | 3 | Giulia Riva | Italy | | 23.30 | =PB | 9 |
| 5 | 2 | 7 | Rebekka Haase | Germany | | 23.46 | | 8 |
| 6 | 2 | 2 | Anna Kiełbasińska | Poland | | 23.46 | | 7 |
| 7 | 1 | 6 | Brigitte Ntiamoah | France | | 23.53 | | 6 |
| 8 | 1 | 5 | Moa Hjelmer | Sweden | | 23.66 | | 5 |
| 9 | 1 | 4 | Elisabeth Slettum | Norway | | 23.76 | | 4 |
| 10 | 1 | 2 | Estela García | Spain | | 23.88 | SB | 3 |
| 11 | 1 | 3 | Milja Thureson | Finland | | 24.44 | | 2 |
| 12 | 1 | 7 | Krystsina Tsimanouskaya | Belarus | | 24.61 | | 1 |

=== 400 metres ===
| Rank | Heat | Lane | Name | Nationality | React | Time | Notes | Points |
|---|---|---|---|---|---|---|---|---|
| 1 | 2 | 5 | Floria Gueï | France | 0.199 | 51.55 | | 12 |
| 2 | 2 | 6 | Mariya Mikhailyuk | Russia | 0.167 | 51.59 | | 11 |
| 3 | 2 | 4 | Libania Grenot | Italy | 0.165 | 51.82 | | 10 |
| 4 | 1 | 6 | Margaret Adeoye | Great Britain | 0.206 | 52.07 | SB | 9 |
| 5 | 2 | 3 | Ruth Sophia Spelmeyer | Germany | 0.172 | 52.61 | | 8 |
| 6 | 2 | 2 | Justyna Święty | Poland | 0.182 | 52.67 | | 7 |
| 7 | 1 | 5 | Viktoriya Tkachuk | Ukraine | 0.219 | 53.46 | | 6 |
| 8 | 2 | 7 | Aauri Lorena Bokesa | Spain | 0.184 | 53.56 | | 5 |
| 9 | 1 | 4 | Ilona Usovich | Belarus | 0.167 | 53.92 | | 4 |
| 10 | 1 | 7 | Josefin Magnusson | Sweden | 0.217 | 54.16 | | 3 |
| 11 | 1 | 3 | Tara Marie Norum | Norway | 0.167 | 54.37 | | 2 |
| 12 | 1 | 2 | Katri Mustola | Finland | 0.172 | 55.00 | SB | 1 |

=== 800 metres ===
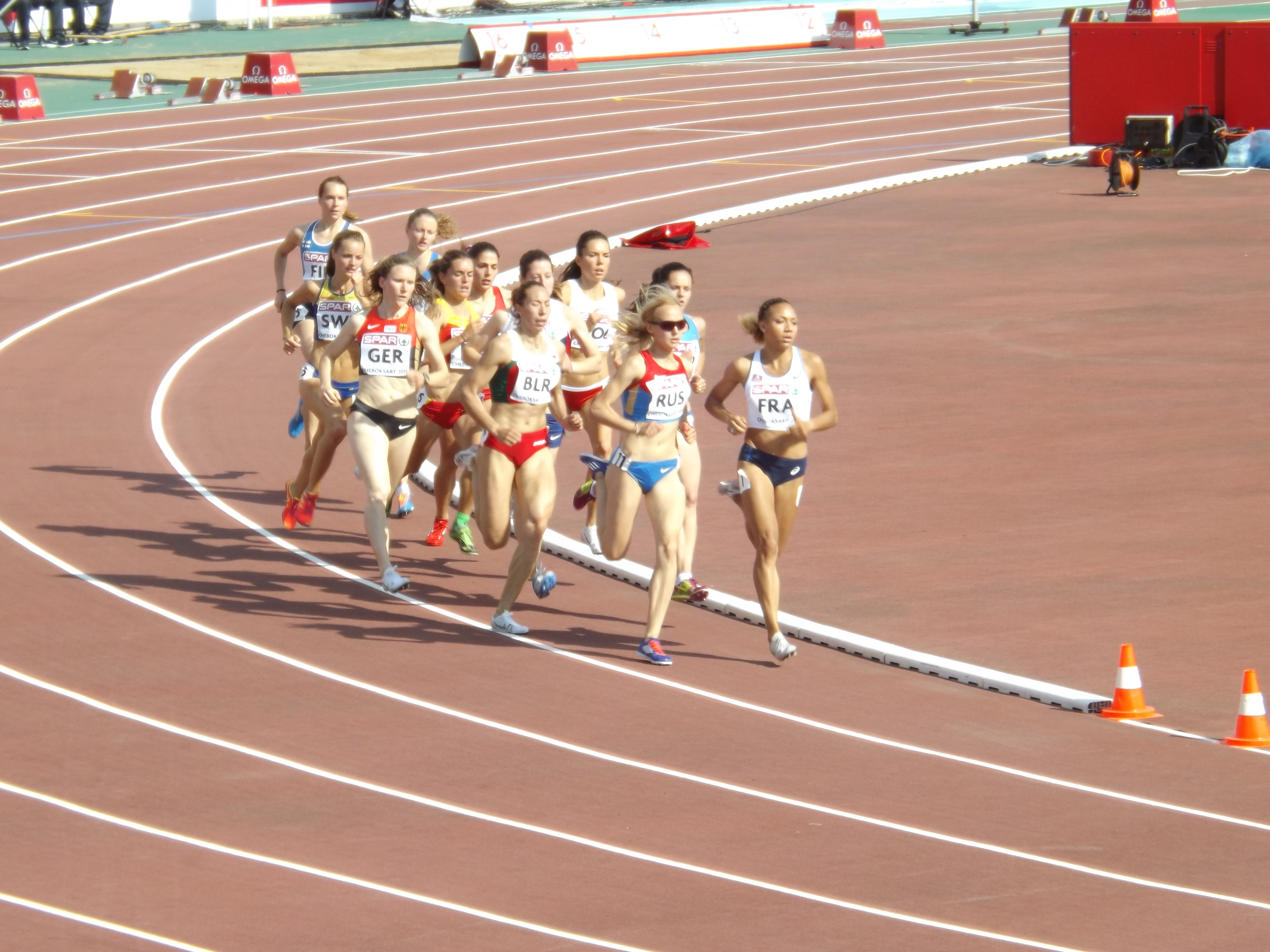

| Rank | Name | Nationality | Time | Notes | Points |
|---|---|---|---|---|---|
| 1 | Rénelle Lamote | France | 2:00.18 | | 12 |
| 2 | Joanna Jóźwik | Poland | 2:00.30 | SB | 11 |
| 3 | Anastasiya Tkachuk | Ukraine | 2:00.72 | SB | 10 |
| 4 | Maryna Arzamasova | Belarus | 2:00.87 | SB | 9 |
| 5 | Fabienne Kohlmann | Germany | 2:01.27 | SB | 8 |
| 6 | Esther Guerrero | Spain | 2:02.99 | | 7 |
| 7 | Alison Leonard | Great Britain | 2:03.06 | | 6 |
| 8 | Trine Mjåland | Norway | 2:03.32 | | 5 |
| 9 | Irene Baldessari | Italy | 2:04.14 | SB | 4 |
| 10 | Lovisa Lindh | Sweden | 2:04.23 | PB | 3 |
| 11 | Aino Paunonen | Finland | 2:06.90 | PB | 2 |
| | Anastasiya Bazdyreva | Russia | 2:01.06 | DSQ | 0 |

=== 1500 metres ===
| Rank | Name | Nationality | Time | Notes | Points |
|---|---|---|---|---|---|
| 1 | Anna Shchagina | Russia | 4:15.22 | | 12 |
| 2 | Karoline Bjerkeli Grøvdal | Norway | 4:16.22 | | 11 |
| 3 | Rhianwedd Price | Great Britain | 4:16.59 | | 10 |
| 4 | Angelika Cichocka | Poland | 4:16.77 | | 9 |
| 5 | Tamara Tverdostup | Ukraine | 4:17.09 | | 8 |
| 6 | Corinna Harrer | Germany | 4:17.81 | | 7 |
| 7 | Margherita Magnani | Italy | 4:18.04 | | 6 |
| 8 | Anna Silvander | Sweden | 4:18.85 | PB | 5 |
| 9 | Ophélie Claude-Boxberger | France | 4:19.07 | | 4 |
| 10 | Solange Andreia Pereira | Spain | 4:20.61 | | 3 |
| 11 | Volha Rulevich | Belarus | 4:21.21 | | 2 |
| 12 | Zenitha Eriksson | Finland | 4:36.40 | SB | 1 |

=== 3000 metres ===
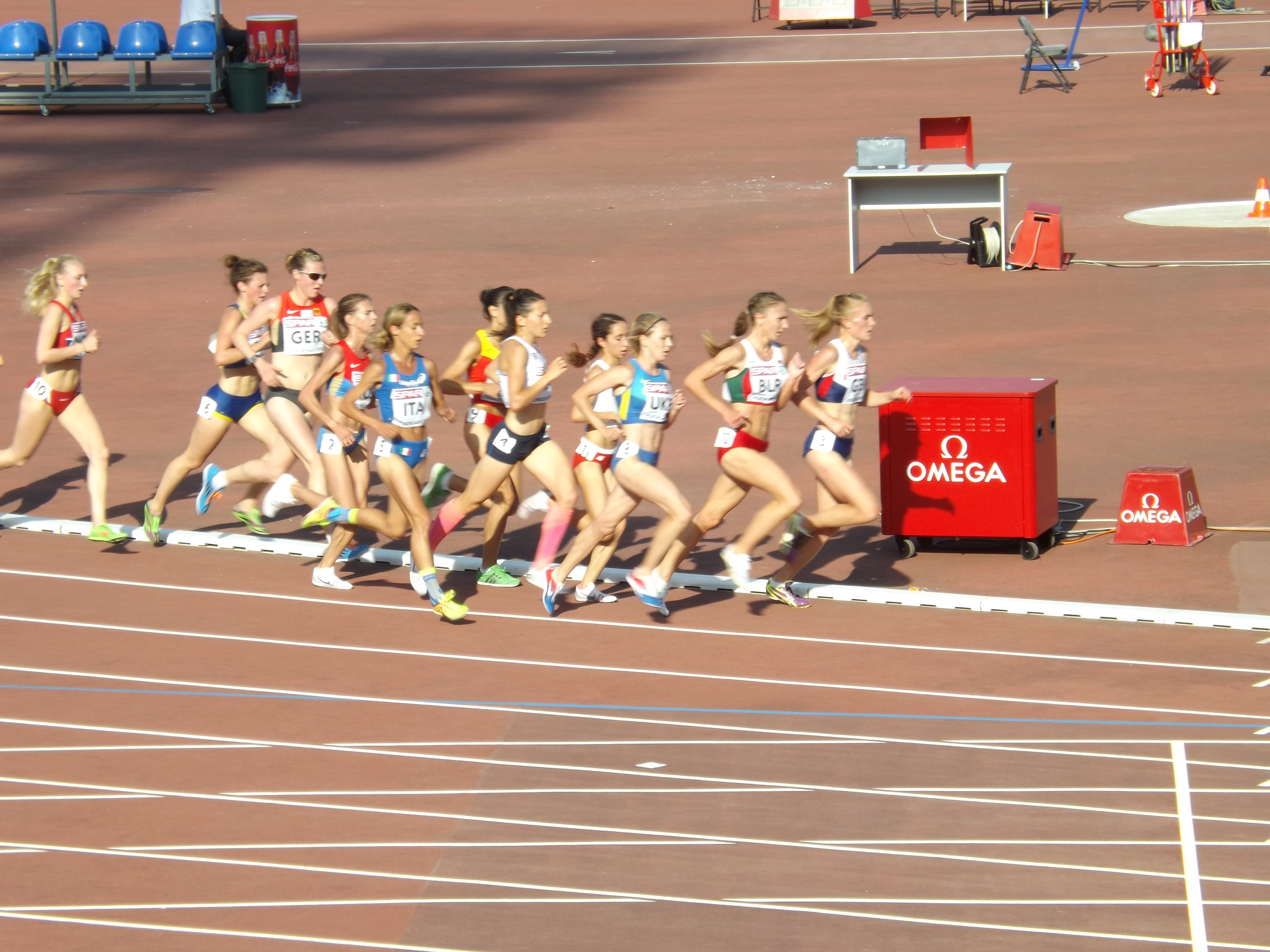

| Rank | Name | Nationality | Time | Notes | Points |
|---|---|---|---|---|---|
| 1 | Sofia Ennaoui | Poland | 9:20.39 | | 12 |
| 2 | Maren Kock | Germany | 9:20.82 | | 11 |
| 3 | Yelena Korobkina | Russia | 9:20.93 | | 10 |
| 4 | Sviatlana Kudzelich | Belarus | 9:24.12 | | 9 |
| 5 | Margherita Magnani | Italy | 9:24.81 | | 8 |
| 6 | Clémence Calvin | France | 9:26.18 | | 7 |
| 7 | Lidia Rodriguez | Spain | 9:27.64 | | 6 |
| 8 | Lauren Deadman | Great Britain | 9:28.84 | | 5 |
| 9 | Klara Bodinson | Sweden | 9:32.84 | PB | 4 |
| 10 | Nataliya Tobias | Ukraine | 9:33.54 | | 3 |
| 11 | Oona Kettunen | Finland | 9:35.20 | | 2 |
| 12 | Elisabeth Angell Bergh | Norway | 10:02.81 | | 1 |

=== 5000 metres ===
| Rank | Name | Nationality | Time | Notes | Points |
|---|---|---|---|---|---|
| 1 | Renata Pliś | Poland | 15:49.29 | | 12 |
| 2 | Volha Mazuronak | Belarus | 15:51.89 | SB | 11 |
| 3 | Clémence Calvin | France | 15:53.28 | | 10 |
| 4 | Gulshat Fazlitdinova | Russia | 15:57.50 | | 9 |
| 5 | Viktoriya Pohoryelska | Ukraine | 15:57.75 | SB | 8 |
| 6 | Silvia Weissteiner | Italy | 16:15.09 | | 7 |
| 7 | Trihas Gebre | Spain | 16:34.94 | | 6 |
| 8 | Lily Partridge | Great Britain | 16:42.61 | | 5 |
| 9 | Diana Sujew | Germany | 16:46.43 | | 4 |
| 10 | Oona Kettunen | Finland | 16:51.54 | | 3 |
| 11 | Louise Nilsson | Sweden | 17:00.94 | | 2 |
| 12 | Live Solheimdal | Norway | 17:21.45 | | 1 |

=== 3000 metres steeplechase ===
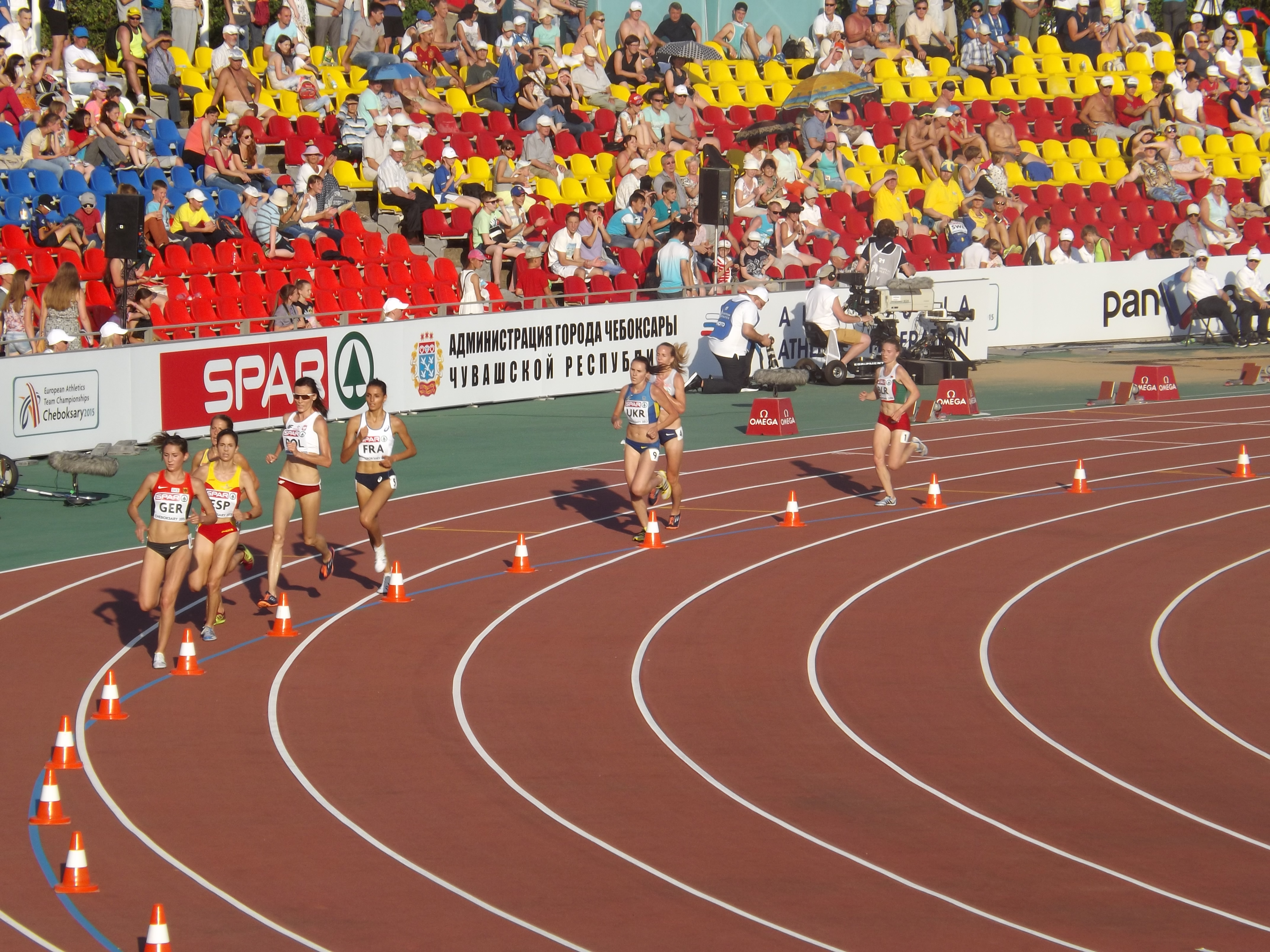

| Rank | Name | Nationality | Time | Notes | Points |
|---|---|---|---|---|---|
| 1 | Gesa-Felicitas Krause | Germany | 9:46.49 | | 12 |
| 2 | Lennie Waite | Great Britain | 9:59.75 | | 11 |
| 3 | Emma Oudiou | France | 10:01.02 | | 10 |
| 4 | Diana Martín | Spain | 10:02.63 | | 9 |
| 5 | Camilla Richardsson | Finland | 10:03.02 | SB | 8 |
| 6 | Katarzyna Kowalska | Poland | 10:03.44 | | 7 |
| 7 | Charlotta Fougberg | Sweden | 10:06.37 | | 6 |
| 8 | Mariya Shatalova | Ukraine | 10:09.34 | | 5 |
| 9 | Nastassia Puzakova | Belarus | 10:11.39 | SB | 4 |
| 10 | Valeria Roffino | Italy | 10:18.10 | | 3 |
| 11 | Yekaterina Ivonina | Russia | 10:34.55 | | 2 |
| 12 | Karoline E. Skatterboe | Norway | 10:44.13 | | 1 |

=== 100 metres hurdles ===
Wind:
Heat 1: m/s
Heat 2: m/s

| Rank | Heat | Lane | Name | Nationality | React | Time | Notes | Points |
|---|---|---|---|---|---|---|---|---|
| 1 | 2 | 6 | Alina Talay | Belarus | 0.203 | 12.80 | | 12 |
| 2 | 2 | 4 | Nina Morozova | Russia | 0.162 | 12.85 | | 11 |
| 3 | 2 | 2 | Cindy Roleder | Germany | 0.172 | 12.92 | =SB | 10 |
| 4 | 2 | 7 | Karolina Kołeczek | Poland | 0.172 | 13.03 | | 9 |
| 5 | 2 | 5 | Cindy Billaud | France | 0.172 | 13.06 | | 8 |
| 6 | 1 | 6 | Hanna Plotitsyna | Ukraine | 0.159 | 13.44 | | 7 |
| 7 | 2 | 3 | Serita Solomon | Great Britain | 0.190 | 13.54 | | 6 |
| 8 | 1 | 5 | Caridad Jerez | Spain | 0.146 | 13.47 | | 5 |
| 9 | 1 | 4 | Isabelle Pedersen | Norway | 0.160 | 13.56 | | 4 |
| 10 | 1 | 2 | Giada Carmassi | Italy | 0.161 | 13.68 | | 3 |
| 11 | 1 | 3 | Caroline Tegel | Sweden | 0.160 | 13.95 | | 2 |
| 12 | 1 | 7 | Viivi Avikainen | Finland | 0.141 | 14.13 | | 1 |

=== 400 metres hurdles ===
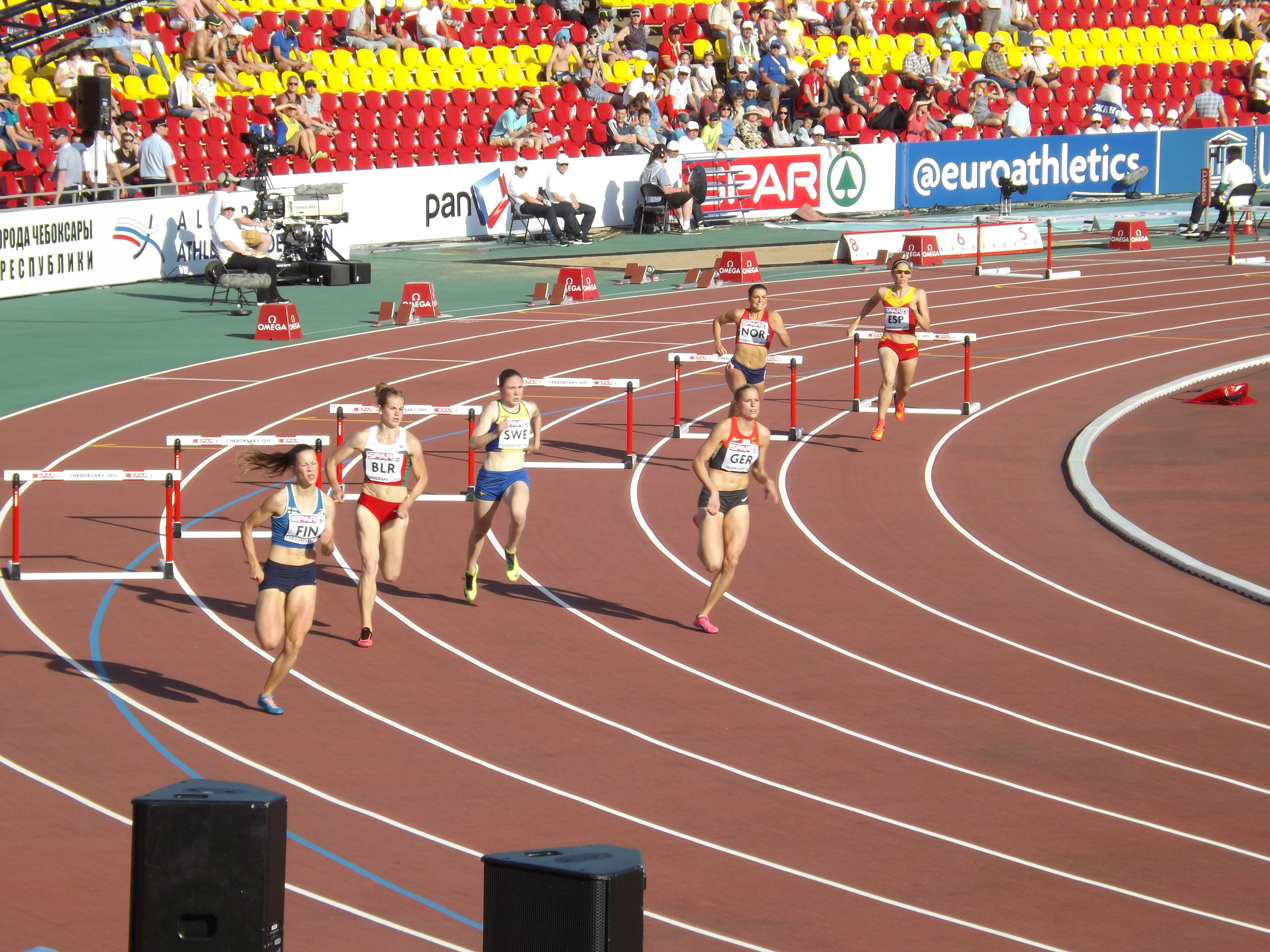
Heat 1

| Rank | Heat | Lane | Name | Nationality | React | Time | Notes | Points |
|---|---|---|---|---|---|---|---|---|
| 1 | 2 | 4 | Eilidh Child | Great Britain | 0.129 | 54.46 | EL | 12 |
| 2 | 2 | 3 | Anna Titimets | Ukraine | 0.175 | 54.75 | SB | 11 |
| 3 | 2 | 2 | Yadisleidy Pedroso | Italy | 0.171 | 55.18 | SB | 10 |
| 4 | 2 | 6 | Vera Rudakova | Russia | 0.316 | 55.83 | | 9 |
| 5 | 1 | 5 | Elise Malmberg | Sweden | 0.220 | 56.06 | PB | 8 |
| 6 | 1 | 6 | Katsiaryna Artsiukh | Belarus | 0.199 | 56.36 | PB | 7 |
| 7 | 2 | 7 | Joanna Linkiewicz | Poland | 0.166 | 56.47 | | 6 |
| 8 | 2 | 5 | Aurélie Chaboudez | France | 0.195 | 56.76 | | 5 |
| 9 | 1 | 4 | Christiane Klopsch | Germany | 0.207 | 56.78 | | 4 |
| 10 | 1 | 7 | Anniina Laitinen | Finland | 0.209 | 58.01 | PB | 3 |
| 11 | 1 | 2 | Laura Sotomayor | Spain | 0.183 | 58.29 | | 2 |
| 12 | 1 | 3 | Marlen Aakre | Norway | 0.166 | 59.76 | SB | 1 |

=== 4 × 100 metres relay ===
| Rank | Heat | Lane | Nation | Athletes | React | Time | Notes | Points |
|---|---|---|---|---|---|---|---|---|
| 1 | 2 | 7 | Ukraine | Nataliya Strohova, Nataliya Pohrebnyak, Viktoriya Kashcheyeva, Hrystyna Stuy | 0.167 | 42.50 | CR | 12 |
| 2 | 2 | 5 | Russia | Marina Panteleyeva, Kseniya Ryzhova, Yelizaveta Demirova, Yekaterina Smirnova | 0.172 | 42.99 | | 11 |
| 3 | 2 | 2 | Germany | Yasmin Kwadwo, Tatjana Pinto, Rebekka Haase, Alexandra Burghardt | 0.175 | 43.21 | | 10 |
| 4 | 2 | 3 | Poland | Marika Popowicz, Anna Kielbasińska, Marta Jeschke, Ewa Swoboda | 0.154 | 43.28 | | 9 |
| 5 | 1 | 5 | Italy | Jessica Paoletta, Irene Siragusa, Anna Bongiorni, Giulia Riva | 0.232 | 43.72 | | 8 |
| 6 | 2 | 4 | France | Brigitte Ntiamoah, Jennifer Galais, Maroussia Paré, Orphée Neola | 0.191 | 43.84 | | 7 |
| 7 | 1 | 3 | Norway | Isabelle Pedersen, Ida Bakke Hansen, Elisabeth Slettum, Ezinne Okparaebo | 0.166 | 43.94 | NR | 6 |
| 8 | 1 | 2 | Sweden | Gladys Bamane, Isabelle Eurenius, Daniella Busk, Moa Hjelmer | 0.156 | 44.04 | | 5 |
| 9 | 1 | 6 | Spain | Paloma Diez, Alazne Furundarena, Estela García, Cristina Lara | 0.164 | 44.19 | | 4 |
| 10 | 1 | 4 | Belarus | Yulia Nestsiarenka, Alina Talay, Volha Astashka, Krystsina Tsimanouskaya | 0.165 | 44.41 | | 3 |
| 11 | 2 | 6 | Great Britain | Louise Bloor, Dina Asher-Smith, Bianca Williams, Laura Maddox | 0.166 | 44.68 | | 2 |
| 12 | 1 | 7 | Finland | Milja Thureson, Jasmin Showlah, Anniina Kortetmaa, Lotta Kemppinen | 0.219 | 45.06 | | 1 |

=== 4 × 400 metres relay ===
| Rank | Heat | Nation | Athletes | Time | Notes | Points |
|---|---|---|---|---|---|---|
| 1 | 2 | Russia | Alena Mamina, Kseniya Zadorina, Kseniya Ryzhova, Mariya Mikhailyuk | 3:24.98 | EL | 12 |
| 2 | 2 | France | Elea-Mariama Diarra, Agnès Raharolahy, Déborah Sananes, Floria Gueï | 3:28.84 | | 11 |
| 3 | 1 | Ukraine | Viktoriya Tkachuk, Alina Lohvynenko, Olha Bibik, Olha Zemlyak | 3:29.79 | | 10 |
| 4 | 2 | Italy | Libania Grenot, Marta Milani, Elena Bonfanti, Chiara Bazzoni | 3:29.79 | | 9 |
| 5 | 2 | Germany | Ruth Spelmeyer, Friederike Möhlenkamp, Christiane Klopsch, Christina Hering | 3:29.86 | | 8 |
| 6 | 2 | Great Britain | Eilidh Child, Meghan Beesley, Laura Maddox, Margaret Adeoye | 3:30.01 | | 7 |
| 7 | 2 | Poland | Martyna Dąbrowska, Ewelina Ptak, Patrycja Wyciszkiewicz, Małgorzata Hołub | 3:30.18 | | 6 |
| 8 | 1 | Belarus | Alena Kievich, Maryna Arzamasova, Yulia Yurenia, Ilona Usovich | 3:32.33 | | 5 |
| 9 | 1 | Spain | Andrea Díez, Indira Terrero, Sara Gómez, Aauri Lorena Bokesa | 3:35.48 | | 4 |
| 10 | 1 | Sweden | Lisa Duffy, Josefin Magnusson, Lovisa Lindh, Elise Malmberg | 3:35.80 | | 3 |
| 11 | 1 | Norway | Emily Rose Norum, Trine Mjåland, Sara Dorthea Jensen, Tara Marie Norum | 3:36.22 | | 2 |
| 12 | 1 | Finland | Anniina Laitinen, Eveliina Määttänen, Kirsi Pekkanen, Aino Paunonen | 3:44.36 | | 1 |

=== High jump ===
| Rank | Name | Nationality | 1.70 | 1.75 | 1.80 | 1.84 | 1.88 | 1.91 | 1.94 | 1.97 | 1.99 | 2.01 | Mark | Notes | Points |
|---|---|---|---|---|---|---|---|---|---|---|---|---|---|---|---|
| 1 | Mariya Kuchina | Russia | – | – | o | o | xo | o | o | o | o | xx | 1.99 | SB | 12 |
| 2 | Ruth Beitia | Spain | – | – | – | o | – | xo | o | o | xx– | x | 1.97 | | 11 |
| 3 | Kamila Lićwinko | Poland | – | – | – | o | o | xo | o | xo | xx | | 1.97 | =SB | 10 |
| 4 | Erika Kinsey | Sweden | – | o | o | o | o | o | xo | xxo | x | | 1.97 | PB | 9 |
| 5 | Iryna Herashchenko | Ukraine | – | – | o | o | o | xo | xo | xx | | | 1.94 | =PB | 8 |
| 6 | Marie-Laurence Jungfleisch | Germany | – | o | o | o | o | xxo | xo | x | | | 1.94 | =SB | 6.5 |
| 6 | Isobel Pooley | Great Britain | – | – | o | o | o | xxo | xo | x | | | 1.94 | SB | 6.5 |
| 8 | Alessia Trost | Italy | – | o | o | xo | o | o | xxo | x | | | 1.94 | SB | 5 |
| 9 | Yana Maksimava | Belarus | – | o | o | o | xxx | | | | | | 1.84 | | 4 |
| 10 | Sini Lällä | Finland | o | o | xo | o | xxx | | | | | | 1.84 | PB | 2.5 |
| 10 | Tonje Angelsen | Norway | – | xo | o | o | xx– | x | | | | | 1.84 | | 2.5 |
| 12 | Mélanie Melfort | France | – | o | xxo | xx | | | | | | | 1.80 | | 1 |

=== Pole vault ===
| Rank | Name | Nationality | 3.50 | 3.75 | 3.95 | 4.10 | 4.25 | 4.40 | 4.50 | 4.60 | 4.70 | 4.75 | 4.80 | 4.85 | Mark | Notes | Points |
|---|---|---|---|---|---|---|---|---|---|---|---|---|---|---|---|---|---|
| 1 | Silke Spiegelburg | Germany | – | – | – | – | o | o | o | xo | x– | xo | – | xxx | 4.75 | =CR | 12 |
| 2 | Anzhelika Sidorova | Russia | – | – | – | – | – | o | o | xo | o | – | xxx | | 4.70 | =PB | 11 |
| 3 | Angelica Bengtsson | Sweden | – | – | o | – | o | xo | o | xxo | x | | | | 4.60 | NR | 10 |
| 4 | Minna Nikkanen | Finland | – | – | – | – | o | o | xxx | | | | | | 4.40 | | 9 |
| 5 | Naroa Agirre | Spain | – | – | o | o | o | xo | xxx | | | | | | 4.40 | | 8.5 |
| 5 | Marion Lotout | France | – | – | – | – | o | xo | xxx | | | | | | 4.40 | | 8.5 |
| 7 | Sally Peake | Great Britain | – | – | xo | o | o | xx– | x | | | | | | 4.25 | | 6 |
| 8 | Katrine Haarklau | Norway | – | o | xo | xo | xo | x | | | | | | | 4.25 | SB | 5 |
| 9 | Iryna Yakaltsevich | Belarus | – | o | o | xxo | xx | | | | | | | | 4.10 | | 4 |
| 10 | Kateryna Kozlova | Ukraine | o | o | xxo | xx | | | | | | | | | 3.95 | | 3 |
| 11 | Justyna Śmietanka | Poland | o | xo | xxx | | | | | | | | | | 3.75 | | 2 |
| | Sonia Malavisi | Italy | – | – | xxx | | | | | | | | | | NM | | 0 |

=== Long jump ===
| Rank | Name | Nationality | #1 | #2 | #3 | #4 | Mark | Notes | Points |
|---|---|---|---|---|---|---|---|---|---|
| 1 | Darya Klishina | Russia | 6.75 | 6.79 | 6.95 | x | 6.95 | CR | 12 |
| 2 | Volha Sudareva | Belarus | 6.50 | 6.79 | x | 6.86 | 6.86 | PB | 11 |
| 3 | Sosthene Taroum Moguenara | Germany | x | 6.79 | 6.75 | x | 6.79 | | 10 |
| 4 | Erica Jarder | Sweden | x | 6.34 | 6.53 | 6.43 | 6.53 | | 9 |
| 5 | Diane Barras | France | 5.86 | 6.52 | 6.24 | | 6.52 | PB | 8 |
| 6 | Jazmin Sawyers | Great Britain | x | x | 6.39 | | 6.39 | | 7 |
| 7 | Krystyna Hryshutyna | Ukraine | 6.33 | x | x | | 6.33 | | 6 |
| 8 | Tania Vicenzino | Italy | 6.29 | x | 6.21 | | 6.29 | | 5 |
| 9 | Concepción Montaner | Spain | x | 6.19 | 6.27 | | 6.27 | | 4 |
| 10 | Nadia Akpana Assa | Norway | 6.06 | x | 6.21 | | 6.21 | | 3 |
| 11 | Karolina Zawiła | Poland | 6.09 | x | 5.81 | | 6.09 | | 2 |
| 12 | Sanna Nygård | Finland | x | x | 5.97 | | 5.97 | | 1 |

=== Triple jump ===
| Rank | Name | Nationality | #1 | #2 | #3 | #4 | Mark | Notes | Points |
|---|---|---|---|---|---|---|---|---|---|
| 1 | Yekaterina Koneva | Russia | 14.41 | 14.98 | 14.72 | 14.87 | 14.98 | CR | 12 |
| 2 | Kristin Gierisch | Germany | x | 14.46 | 14.02 | 13.86 | 14.46 | | 10 |
| 3 | Simona La Mantia | Italy | 14.10 | 14.22 | 14.05 | 13.65 | 14.22 | SB | 10 |
| 4 | Laura Samuel | Great Britain | x | 14.06 | x | x | 14.06 | SB | 9 |
| 5 | Ana Peleteiro | Spain | 13.62 | 14.03 | 13.97 | | 14.03 | | 8 |
| 6 | Jeanine Assani Issouf | France | 13.97 | 13.57 | x | | 13.97 | | 7 |
| 7 | Kristiina Mäkelä | Finland | x | 13.78 | 13.88 | | 13.88 | | 6 |
| 8 | Tetyana Ptashkina | Ukraine | 13.65 | 13.83 | 13.50 | | 13.83 | | 5 |
| 9 | Anna Zych | Poland | 13.45 | 13.55 | 13.40 | | 13.55 | SB | 4 |
| 10 | Ksenia Dziatsuk | Belarus | 13.42 | 13.43 | 13.15 | | 13.43 | | 3 |
| 11 | Malin Marmbrandt | Sweden | 12.75 | x | 12.47 | | 12.75 | | 2 |
| 12 | Monika Benserud | Norway | 12.10 | 11.77 | x | | 12.10 | | 1 |

=== Shot put ===
| Rank | Name | Nationality | #1 | #2 | #3 | #4 | Mark | Notes | Points |
|---|---|---|---|---|---|---|---|---|---|
| 1 | Christina Schwanitz | Germany | 18.85 | 19.82 | 19.34 | x | 19.82 | CR | 12 |
| 2 | Irina Tarasova | Russia | 18.07 | 18.51 | 17.86 | x | 18.51 | | 11 |
| 3 | Aliona Dubitskaya | Belarus | 18.38 | x | x | 17.76 | 18.38 | | 10 |
| 4 | Chiara Rosa | Italy | 17.88 | x | 17.63 | x | 17.88 | SB | 9 |
| 5 | Paulina Guba | Poland | 16.79 | 16.87 | 16.56 | | 16.87 | | 8 |
| 6 | Fanny Roos | Sweden | 15.24 | 15.52 | 16.83 | | 16.83 | | 7 |
| 7 | Jessica Cérival | France | 16.76 | 16.44 | x | | 16.76 | | 6 |
| 8 | Halyna Obleshchuk | Ukraine | 15.41 | 16.68 | 16.69 | | 16.69 | | 5 |
| 9 | Úrsula Ruiz | Spain | 16.05 | x | 16.61 | | 16.61 | | 4 |
| 10 | Rachel Wallader | Great Britain | 15.49 | 15.50 | 15.11 | | 15.50 | | 3 |
| 11 | Kristin Sundsteigen | Norway | 13.59 | 14.21 | 13.95 | | 14.21 | | 2 |
| 12 | Eveliina Rouvali | Finland | 13.21 | 13.18 | x | | 13.21 | | 1 |

=== Discus throw ===
| Rank | Name | Nationality | #1 | #2 | #3 | #4 | Mark | Notes | Points |
|---|---|---|---|---|---|---|---|---|---|
| 1 | Mélina Robert-Michon | France | 62.21 | x | 62.24 | x | 62.24 | | 12 |
| 2 | Żaneta Glanc | Poland | 54.45 | 58.24 | 58.92 | x | 58.92 | | 11 |
| 3 | Sanna Kämäräinen | Finland | 58.53 | x | 58.45 | x | 58.53 | | 10 |
| 4 | Nataliya Semenova | Ukraine | 58.03 | x | 55.88 | x | 58.03 | | 9 |
| 5 | Julia Fischer | Germany | x | 57.74 | x | | 57.74 | | 8 |
| 6 | Sabina Asenjo | Spain | 56.16 | 55.17 | x | | 56.16 | | 7 |
| 7 | Yekaterina Strokova | Russia | x | 51.28 | 56.10 | | 56.10 | | 6 |
| 8 | Sofia Larsson | Sweden | 45.85 | 54.88 | x | | 54.88 | | 5 |
| 9 | Valentina Aniballi | Italy | 45.62 | 52.79 | x | | 52.79 | | 4 |
| 10 | Kirsty Law | Great Britain | 48.90 | 50.93 | 48.56 | | 50.93 | | 3 |
| 11 | Grete Etholm | Norway | 41.51 | 47.85 | 48.04 | | 48.04 | | 2 |
| 12 | Nastassia Kashtanava | Belarus | x | 45.37 | 46.45 | | 46.45 | | 1 |

=== Hammer throw ===
| Rank | Name | Nationality | #1 | #2 | #3 | #4 | Mark | Notes | Points |
|---|---|---|---|---|---|---|---|---|---|
| 1 | Anita Włodarczyk | Poland | x | 74.38 | x | 78.28 | 78.28 | CR | 12 |
| 2 | Betty Heidler | Germany | 68.28 | 68.16 | 72.18 | 75.73 | 75.73 | SB | 11 |
| 3 | Alexandra Tavernier | France | 74.05 | x | 72.13 | x | 74.05 | PB | 10 |
| 4 | Alena Sobaleva | Belarus | 70.35 | 72.86 | x | x | 72.86 | PB | 9 |
| 5 | Sophie Hitchon | Great Britain | 69.67 | x | 71.89 | | 71.89 | SB | 8 |
| 6 | Oksana Kondratyeva | Russia | 69.07 | 71.07 | 69.24 | | 71.07 | | 7 |
| 7 | Iryna Novozhylova | Ukraine | 69.25 | 66.76 | 63.90 | | 69.25 | | 6 |
| 8 | Eleni Larsson | Sweden | 64.92 | x | 68.76 | | 68.76 | PB | 5 |
| 9 | Silvia Salis | Italy | 66.45 | x | 67.80 | | 67.80 | | 4 |
| 10 | Merja Korpela | Finland | 66.17 | 64.38 | 66.50 | | 66.50 | | 3 |
| 11 | Berta Castells | Spain | 65.35 | x | 65.51 | | 65.61 | | 2 |
| 12 | Beatrice Nedberge Llano | Norway | 60.77 | 64.40 | 61.59 | | 64.40 | PB | 1 |

=== Javelin throw ===
| Rank | Name | Nationality | #1 | #2 | #3 | #4 | Mark | Notes | Points |
|---|---|---|---|---|---|---|---|---|---|
| 1 | Christina Obergföll | Germany | x | 61.69 | x | 60.98 | 61.69 | | 12 |
| 2 | Tatsiana Khaladovich | Belarus | 61.08 | x | 58.75 | 57.62 | 61.08 | | 11 |
| 3 | Jenni Kangas | Finland | 51.63 | 55.33 | 51.99 | 52.95 | 55.33 | | 10 |
| 4 | Sara Jemai | Italy | 51.34 | 54.86 | 51.83 | 54.23 | 54.86 | | 9 |
| 5 | Anna Wessman | Sweden | 54.35 | 53.24 | 53.96 | | 54.35 | | 8 |
| 6 | Mercedes Chilla | Spain | 54.02 | 53.34 | 52.90 | | 54.02 | | 7 |
| 7 | Hanna Hatsko-Fedusova | Ukraine | 53.84 | x | x | | 53.84 | | 6 |
| 8 | Laura Whittingham | Great Britain | 53.49 | 51.38 | 49.53 | | 53.49 | SB | 5 |
| 9 | Marta Kąkol | Poland | 53.44 | 50.82 | x | | 53.44 | | 4 |
| 10 | Viktoriya Sudarushkina | Russia | 52.19 | x | x | | 52.19 | | 3 |
| 11 | Matilde Andraud | France | 51.73 | x | 52.93 | | 52.93 | | 2 |
| 12 | Sigrid Borge | Norway | 49.63 | x | 48.05 | | 49.63 | | 1 |
