= 2015 European Athletics Team Championships =

2015 European Team Championships
- Host city: Cheboksary, Russia (Super League)
- Events: 40
- Dates: 20–21 June 2015

The sixth European Athletics Team Championships took place on 20 and 21 June 2015.

== Super League ==
Place: Central Stadium, Cheboksary, Russia

=== Participating countries ===
- Belarus
- Finland
- France
- Germany
- Great Britain
- Italy
- Norway
- Poland
- Russia
- Spain
- Sweden
- Ukraine
- Belarus, Finland and Norway were promoted from 2014 First League.

=== Men's events ===
Event	Gold		Silver		Bronze	
100 m	Christophe Lemaitre; France	10.26	Richard Kilty; Great Britain	10.35	Sven Knipphals; Germany	10.50
200 m	Serhiy Smelyk; Ukraine	20.45; SB	Danny Talbot; Great Britain	20.62; SB	Enrico Demonte; Italy	20.67; SB
400 m	Jarryd Dunn; Great Britain	45.09; PB	Mame-Ibra Anne; France	45.26; PB	Aliaksandr Linnik; Belarus	45.43; NR
800 m	Giordano Benedetti; Italy	1:45.11; CR	Pierre-Ambroise Bosse; France	1:45.14	Adam Kszczot; Poland	1:45.84
1500 m	Valentin Smirnov; Russia	3:52.03	Marcin Lewandowski; Poland	3:52.06	Oli Aitchison; Great Britain	3:52.33
3000 m	Richard Ringer; Germany	8:34.35	Roberto Aláiz; Spain	8:35.07	Andrew Butchart; Great Britain	8:35.75
5000 m	Mourad Amdouni; France	14:04.63	Jesús España; Spain	14:05.09	Andy Vernon; Great Britain	14:05.85
3000 m steeplechase	Krystian Zalewski; Poland	8:37.51	Nikolay Chavkin; Russia	8:39.39	Yuri Floriani; Italy	8:40.47
110 m hurdles	Sergey Shubenkov; Russia	13.22; SB	Pascal Martinot-Lagarde; France	13.42	Lawrence Clarke; Great Britain	13.64
400 m hurdles	Denis Kudryavtsev; Russia	48.67; CR	Patryk Dobek; Poland	49.04; PB	Leonardo Capotosti; Italy	49.93; PB
4 × 100 m	Richard Kilty; Danny Talbot; James Ellington; Andrew Robertson; United Kingdom	38.21; CR	Pierre Vincent; Christophe Lemaître; Pierre-Alexis Pessonneaux; Emmanuel Biron; France	38.34	Massimiliano Ferraro; Enrico Demonte; Davide Manenti; Delmas Obou; Italy	38.71
4 × 400 m	Mame-Ibra Anne; Mamoudou Hanne; Teddy Venel; Thomas Jordier; France	3:00.47 CR	Rabah Yousif; Conrad Williams; Delano Williams; Richard Buck; Great Britain	3:00.54	Łukasz Krawczuk; Michał Pietrzak; Rafał Omelko; Patryk Dobek; Poland	3:01.24
High jump	Daniyil Tsyplakov; Russia	2.33 =PB	Marco Fassinotti; Italy	2.28	Mateusz Przybylko; Germany	2.25
Pole vault	Renaud Lavillenie; France	5.85	Raphael Holzdeppe; Germany	5.85; SB	Piotr Lisek; Poland	5.80<sb>SB
Long jump	Aleksandr Menkov; Russia	8.26	Kafétien Gomis; France	8.26; PB	Alyn Camara; Germany	8.11
Triple jump	Fabrizio Donato; Italy	17.11	Aleksey Fyodorov; Russia	16.92	Simo Lipsanen; Finland	16.62
Shot put	David Storl; Germany	21.20	Tomasz Majewski; Poland	20.23	Pavel Lyzhyn; Belarus	20.15
Discus	Robert Urbanek; Poland	63.03	Martin Wierig; Germany	60.23	Frank Casañas; Spain	60.01; SB
Hammer	Paweł Fajdek; Poland	81.64; CR	Nick Miller; Great Britain	75.91	Yevhen Vynohradov; Ukraine	75.91; SB
Javelin	Tero Pitkämäki; Finland	84.44	Johannes Vetter; Germany	78.97	Valeriy Iordan; Russia	78.32
WR world record | AR area record | CR championship record | GR games record | NR national record | OR Olympic record | PB personal best | SB season best | WL world leading (in a given season)

=== Women's events ===
Event	Gold		Silver		Bronze	
100 m	Asha Philip; Great Britain	11.27	Nataliya Pohrebnyak; Ukraine	11.29	Ewa Swoboda; Poland	11.48
200 m	Nataliya Pohrebnyak; Ukraine	22.76; PB	Bianca Williams; Great Britain	23.16	Yekaterina Smirnova; Russia	23.29
400 m	Floria Gueï; France	51.55	Mariya Mikhailyuk; Russia	51.59	Libania Grenot; Italy	51.82
800 m	Rénelle Lamote; France	2:00.18	Joanna Jóźwik; Poland	2:00.30; SB	Anastasiya Tkachuk; Ukraine	2:00.72; SB
1500 m	Anna Shchagina; Russia	4:15.22	Karoline Bjerkeli Grøvdal; Norway	4:16.22	Rhianwedd Price; Great Britain	4:16.59
3000 m	Sofia Ennaoui; Poland	9:20.39	Maren Kock; Germany	9:20.82	Yelena Korobkina; Russia	9:20.93
5000 m	Renata Pliś; Poland	15:49.31	Volha Mazuronak; Belarus	15:51.89; SB	Clémence Calvin; France	15:53.28
3000 m steeplechase	Gesa-Felicitas Krause; Germany	9:46.49	Lennie Waite; Great Britain	9:59.75	Emma Oudiou; France	10:01.02
100 m hurdles	Alina Talay; Belarus	12.80	Nina Morozova; Russia	12.85	Cindy Roleder; Germany	12.92 =SB
400 m hurdles	Eilidh Child; Great Britain	54.47; EL	Anna Titimets; Ukraine	54.75; SB	Yadisleidy Pedroso; Italy	55.18; SB
4 × 100 m	Nataliya Strohova; Nataliya Pohrebnyak; Viktoriya Kashcheyeva; Hrystyna Stuy; Ukraine	42.50; CR	Marina Panteleyeva; Kseniya Ryzhova; Yelizaveta Demirova; Yekaterina Smirnova; Russia	42.99	Yasmin Kwadwo; Tatjana Pinto; Rebekka Haase; Alexandra Burghardt; Germany	43.21
4 × 400 m	Alena Mamina; Kseniya Zadorina; Kseniya Ryzhova; Mariya Mikhailyuk; Russia	3:24.98; EL	Elea-Mariama Diarra; Agnès Raharolahy; Déborah Sananes; Floria Gueï; France	3:28.84	Viktoriya Tkachuk; Alina Lohvynenko; Olha Bibik; Olha Zemlyak; Ukraine	3:29.79
High jump	Mariya Kuchina; Russia	1.99; SB	Ruth Beitia; Spain	1.97	Kamila Lićwinko; Poland	1.97 =SB
Pole vault	Silke Spiegelburg; Germany	4.75 =CR	Anzhelika Sidorova; Russia	4.70 =PB	Angelica Bengtsson; Sweden	4.60; NR
Long jump	Darya Klishina; Russia	6.95; CR	Volha Sudareva; Belarus	6.86; PB	Sosthene Taroum Moguenara; Germany	6.79
Triple jump	Yekaterina Koneva; Russia	14.98	Kristin Gierisch; Germany	14.46	Simona La Mantia; Italy	14.22; SB
Shot put	Christina Schwanitz; Germany	19.82; CR	Irina Tarasova; Russia	18.51	Aliona Dubitskaya; Belarus	18.38
Discus	Mélina Robert-Michon; France	62.24	Żaneta Glanc; Poland	58.92	Sanna Kämäräinen; Finland	58.53
Hammer	Anita Włodarczyk; Poland	78.28; CR	Betty Heidler; Germany	75.73; SB	Alexandra Tavernier; France	74.05; PB
Javelin	Christina Obergföll; Germany	61.69	Tatsiana Khaladovich; Belarus	61.08	Jenni Kangas; Finland	55.33
WR world record | AR area record | CR championship record | GR games record | NR national record | OR Olympic record | PB personal best | SB season best | WL world leading (in a given season)

=== Score table ===
Event		BLR	FIN	FRA	GER	GBR	ITA	NOR	POL	RUS	ESP	SWE	UKR
100 metres	M	2	3	12	10	11	9	4	5	7	1	6	8
100 metres	W	5	1	3	9	12	7	6	10	8	4	2	11
200 metres	M	3	4	6	5	11	10	2	8.5	1	7	8.5	12
200 metres	W	1	2	6	8	11	9	4	7	10	3	5	12
400 metres	M	10	1	11	7	12	4	6	3	9	5	2	8
400 metres	W	4	1	12	8	9	10	2	7	11	5	3	6
800 metres	M	1	2	11	6	4	12	3	10	9	5	7	8
800 metres	W	9	1	12	7	5	2	4	11	8	6	3	10
1500 metres	M	2	1	5	9	10	4	6	11	12	7	3	8
1500 metres	W	2	1	4	7	10	6	11	9	12	3	5	8
3000 metres	M	5	2	7	12	10	4	3	8	9	11	1	6
3000 metres	W	9	2	7	11	5	8	1	12	10	6	4	3
5000 metres	M	1	2	12	3	10	8	4	5	9	11	7	6
5000 metres	W	11	3	10	4	5	7	1	12	9	6	2	8
3000 metre steeplechase	M	2	8	4	9	3	10	1	12	11	7	5	6
3000 metre steeplechase	W	4	8	10	12	11	3	1	7	2	9	6	5
110/100 metre hurdles	M	5	4	11	9	10	8	1	7	12	6	2	3
110/100 metre hurdles	W	12	1	8	10	5	3	4	9	11	6	2	7
400 metre hurdles	M	3	9	5	6	8	10	2	11	12	7	1	4
400 metre hurdles	W	7	3	5	4	12	10	1	6	9	2	8	11
4 × 100 metres relay	M	2	3	11	9	12	10	0	5	6	4	7	8
4 × 100 metres relay	W	3	1	7	10	2	8	6	9	11	4	5	12
4 × 400 metres relay	M	3	1	12	8	11	5	2	10	9	6	4	7
4 × 400 metres relay	W	5	1	11	8	7	9	2	6	12	4	3	10
High jump	M	9	2	8	10	6.5	11	1	3	12	5	4	6.5
High jump	W	4	2.5	1	6.5	6.5	5	2.5	10	12	11	9	8
Pole vault	M	5	1	12	11	4	9	7.5	10	7.5	3	2	6
Pole vault	W	4	9	7.5	12	6	0	5	2	11	7.5	10	3
Long jump	M	2	6	11	10	5	3	1	4	12	7	9	8
Long jump	W	11	1	8	10	7	5	3	2	12	4	9	6
Triple jump	M	9	10	6	7	2	12	1	4	11	8	3	5
Triple jump	W	3	6	7	11	9	10	1	4	12	8	2	5
Shot put	M	10	6	9	12	2	5	1	11	8	7	4	3
Shot put	W	10	1	6	12	3	9	2	8	11	4	7	5
Discus throw	M	4	2	8	11	5	9	6	12	7	10	0	3
Discus throw	W	1	10	12	8	3	4	2	11	6	7	5	9
Hammer throw	M	7	3	6	1	11	8	5	12	9	4	2	10
Hammer throw	W	9	3	10	11	8	4	1	12	7	2	5	6
Javelin throw	M	7	12	3	11	2	9	4	8	10	1	6	5
Javelin throw	W	11	10	3	12	5	9	1	4	2	7	8	6
Country		BLR	FIN	FRA	GER	GBR	ITA	NOR	POL	RUS	ESP	SWE	UKR
Total													

=== Final standings ===
Pos	Country	Pts	Note
1	Russia	349.5	
2	Germany	348.5	
3	France	320.5	
4	Poland	318	
5	Great Britain	293	
6	Italy	290	
7	Ukraine	281.5	
8	Spain	232.5	
9	Belarus	218	
10	Sweden	189	Relegation to the 2017 First League
11	Finland	151.5	Relegation to the 2017 First League
12	Norway	123	Relegation to the 2017 First League

== First League ==
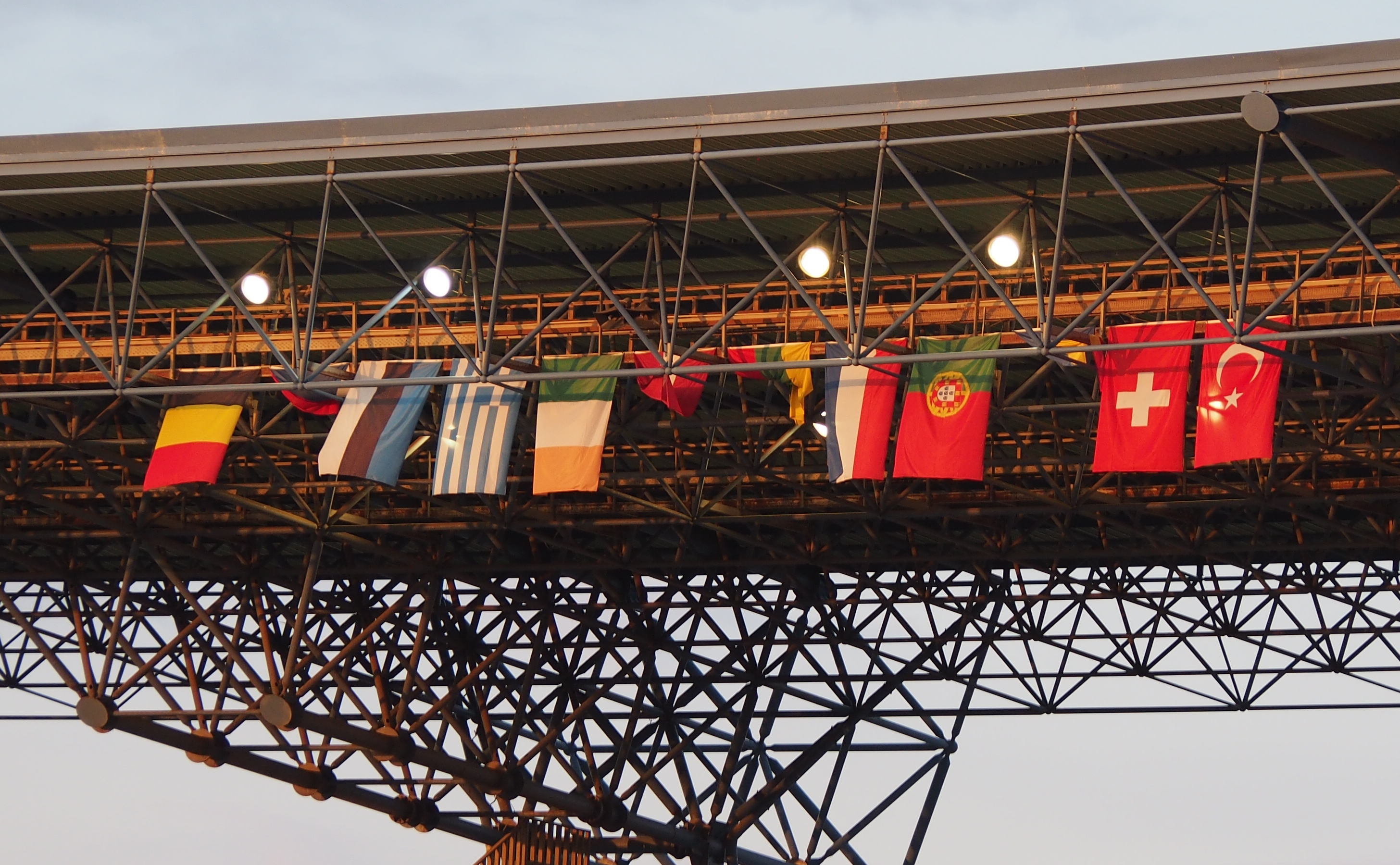
The flags of the participating countries

Place: Pankritio Stadium, Heraklion, Greece

=== Participating countries ===
- Belgium
- Czech Republic
- Estonia
- Greece
- Ireland
- Latvia
- Lithuania
- Netherlands
- Portugal
- Romania
- Switzerland
- Turkey
- Czech Republic, Netherlands and Turkey were relegated from 2014 Super League.
- Latvia and Switzerland were promoted from 2014 Second League.

=== Men's events ===
Event	Gold		Silver		Bronze	
100 m	Likourgos-Stefanos Tsakonas; Greece	10.32	Yazaldes Nascimento; Portugal	10.38	Churandy Martina; Netherlands	10.41
200 m	Likourgos-Stefanos Tsakonas; Greece	20.44	Ramil Guliyev; Turkey	20.67; SB	Terrence Agard; Netherlands	20.79
400 m	Pavel Maslák; Czech Republic	45.57	Liemarvin Bonevacia; Netherlands	45.94	Marek Niit; Estonia	46.11
800 m	İlham Tanui Özbilen; Turkey	1:47.97	Mark English; Ireland	1:48.28	Thijmen Kupers; Netherlands	1:48.90
1500 m	İlham Tanui Özbilen; Turkey	3:38.03	Jakub Holuša; Czech Republic	3:41.39	Pieter-Jan Hannes; Belgium	3:41.54
3000 m	Halil Akkaş; Turkey	8:12.00; SB	Dennis Licht; Netherlands	8:12.28	John Travers; Ireland	8:12.76; SB
5000 m	Bashir Abdi; Belgium	15:17.47	Tiidrek Nurme; Estonia	15:19.73	Nicolae Soare; Romania	15:20.24
3000 m steeplechase	Tarik Langat Akdag; Turkey	8:44.53	Kaur Kivistik; Estonia	8:46.81	Andrei Stefana; Romania	8:47.73; PB
110 m hurdles	Konstadínos Douvalídis; Greece	13.58	Ben Reynolds; Ireland	13.73; SB	Petr Svoboda; Czech Republic	13.74
400 m hurdles	Rasmus Mägi; Estonia	49.59	Thomas Barr; Ireland	49.66	Kariem Hussein; Switzerland	49.96
4 × 100 m	Solomon Bockarie; Churandy Martina; Hensley Paulina; Wouter Brus; Netherlands	39.23	Tobias Furer; Rolf Fongué; Bastien Mouthon; Pascal Mancini; Switzerland	40.00	Panayiótis Andreádis; Víktor Kremmídas; Ioánnis Nifadópoulos; Konstadínos Douvalídis; Greece	40.06
4 × 400 m	Jan Tesař; Michal Desenský; Roman Flaška; Pavel Maslák; Czech Republic	3:04.52	Bjorn Blauwhof; Liemarvin Bonevacia; Tony van Diepen; Terrence Agard; Netherlands	3:04.91	Brian Gregan; Thomas Barr; Craig Lynch; Mark English; Ireland	3:05.07
High jump	Jaroslav Bába; Czech Republic	2.30; SB	Konstadinos Baniotis; Greece	2.28; SB	Mihai Donisan; Romania	2.24
Pole vault	Konstadínos Filippídis; Greece	5.80; SB	Jan Kudlička; Czech Republic	5.75 =SB	Arnaud Art; Belgium	5.65; PB
Long jump	Louis Tsatoumas; Greece	7.77; SB	Radek Juška; Czech Republic	7.73	Bruno Costa; Portugal	7.62; PB
Triple jump	Nelson Évora; Portugal	16.34	Dimítrios Tsiámis; Greece	16.14	Musa Tüzen; Turkey	15.94
Shot put	Tomas Stanek; Czech Republic	19.67	Andrei Gag; Romania	19.43	Tsanko Arnaudov; Portugal	19.30
Discus	Philip Milanov; Belgium	62.02	Andrius Gudžius; Lithuania	60.98	Erik Cadée; Netherlands	60.88
Hammer	Lukas Melich; Czech Republic	74.84	Mihaíl Anastasákis; Greece	72.55; PB	Igors Sokolovs; Latvia	69.94
Javelin	Tanel Laanmäe; Estonia	82.67; PB	Petr Frydrych; Czech Republic	78.93	Rolands Štrobinders; Latvia	77.07
WR world record | AR area record | CR championship record | GR games record | NR national record | OR Olympic record | PB personal best | SB season best | WL world leading (in a given season)

=== Women's events ===
Event	Gold		Silver		Bronze	
100 m	Dafne Schippers; Netherlands	11.12	Lina Grinčikaitė-Samuolė; Lithuania	11.56	Amy Foster; Ireland	11.60
200 m	Dafne Schippers; Netherlands	22.45	María Belibasáki; Greece	23.44	Lina Grinčikaitė-Samuolė; Lithuania	23.68; SB
400 m	Nicky van Leuveren; Netherlands	52.04; PB	Bianca Răzor; Romania	52.04; SB	Denisa Rosolová; Czech Republic	52.30; SB
800 m	Selina Büchel; Switzerland	2:00.56	Lenka Masná; Czech Republic	2:01.93; SB	Renée Eykens; Belgium	2:02.80; PB
1500 m	Claudia Bobocea; Romania	4:14.58; PB	Natalija Piliušina; Lithuania	4:15.01 =SB	Kerry O'Flaherty; Ireland	4:15.79
3000 m	Sara Moreira; Portugal	9:01.67; SB	Louise Carton; Belgium	9:07.61; PB	Sara Treacy; Ireland	9:10.18
5000 m	Jip Vastenburg; Netherlands	15:36.22; SB	Kristiina Mäki; Czech Republic	15:49.47; SB	Dulce Félix; Portugal	15:51.96; SB
3000 m steeplechase	Özlem Kaya; Turkey	9:43.07	Fabienne Schlumpff; Switzerland	9:50.32	Michele Finn; Ireland	9:52.67
100 m hurdles	Anne Zagré; Belgium	13.03; SB	Noemi Zbären; Switzerland	13.09	Nadine Visser; Netherlands	13.16
400 m hurdles	Zuzana Hejnová; Czech Republic	55.11	Axelle Dauwens; Belgium	56.44	Robine Schürmann; Switzerland	57.29
4 × 100 m	Nadine Visser; Dafne Schippers; Naomi Sedney; Jamile Samuel; Netherlands	42.88	María Gátou; Yeoryía Koklóni; Andriána Férra; María Belibasáki; Greece	43.80	Marisa Lavanchy; Léa Sprunger; Joëlle Golay; Sarah Atcho; Switzerland	44.07
4 × 400 m	Denisa Rosolová; Lenka Masná; Zdeňka Seidlová; Zuzana Hejnová; Czech Republic	3:32.37	Petra Fontanive; Léa Sprunger; Robine Schürmann; Selina Büchel; Switzerland	3:33.18	Laura de Witte; Lisanne de Witte; Tessa van Schagen; Nicky van Leuveren; Netherlands	3:33.30
High jump	Oldřiška Marešová; Czech Republic	1.88	Burcu Yüksel; Turkey	1.88; SB	Tatiána Goúsin; Greece	1.85; SB
Pole vault	Nikoléta Kiriakopoúlou; Greece	4.65	Femke Pluim; Netherlands	4.45	Jiřina Svobodová; Czech Republic	4.45
Long jump	Karin Melis Mey; Turkey	6.53	Háido Alexoúli; Greece	6.43	Ksenija Balta; Estonia	6.40
Triple jump	Paraskeví Papahrístou; Greece	13.99 =SB	Susana Costa; Portugal	13.78	Cristina Bujin; Romania	13.59
Shot put	Emel Dereli; Turkey	17.47	Melissa Boekelman; Netherlands	17.00	Jolien Boumkwo; Belgium	16.02
Discus	Zinaida Sendriūtė; Lithuania	60.51	Irina Rodrigues; Portugal	60.48	Hrisoúla Anagnostopoúlou; Greece	58.24
Hammer	Tereza Králová; Czech Republic	64.52	Bianca Lazăr; Romania	64.48; PB	Iliána Korosídou; Greece	62.37
Javelin	Barbora Špotáková; Czech Republic	62.56	Madara Palameika; Latvia	58.86	Sofía Ifadídou; Greece	55.58
WR world record | AR area record | CR championship record | GR games record | NR national record | OR Olympic record | PB personal best | SB season best | WL world leading (in a given season)

=== Score table ===
Event		BEL	CZE	EST	GRE	IRL	LAT	LTU	NED	POR	ROU	CHE	TUR
100 metres	M	1	5	2	12	4	3	7	10	11	9	8	6
100 metres	W	5	7	1	9	10	2	11	12	6	3	8	4
200 metres	M	5	9	6	12	7	3	1	10	8	2	4	11
200 metres	W	2	5	9	11	7	6	10	12	3	4	8	1
400 metres	M	8	12	10	7	9	2	1	11	5	3	4	6
400 metres	W	9	10	1	5	3	6	2	12	7	11	8	4
800 metres	M	8	7	4	6	11	3	2	10	5	1	9	12
800 metres	W	10	11	1	7	9	2	5	8	3	6	12	4
1500 metres	M	10	11	3	9	7	8	1	5	6	4	2	12
1500 metres	W	9	2	1	5	10	7	11	6	4	12	3	8
3000 metres	M	1	6	8	4	10	7	3	11	9	2	5	12
3000 metres	W	11	9	1	3	10	8	4	7	12	2	6	5
5000 metres	M	12	4	11	5	9	2	1	3	7	10	8	6
5000 metres	W	2	11	5	4	9	1	7	12	10	6	3	8
3000 metre steeplechase	M	9	7	11	2	5	3	6	4	8	10	1	12
3000 metre steeplechase	W	6	1	8	4	10	2	5	3	7	9	11	12
110/100 metre hurdles	M	7	10	0	12	11	2	4	8	6	5	9	3
110/100 metre hurdles	W	12	8	1	9	7	5.5	5.5	10	3	4	11	2
400 metre hurdles	M	4	8	12	5	11	7	1	3	2	6	10	9
400 metre hurdles	W	11	12	8	2	6	1	9	3	5	4	10	7
4 × 100 metres relay	M	5	7	9	10	6	3	4	12	0	0	11	8
4 × 100 metres relay	W	8	9	3	11	7	4	5	12	6	0	10	2
4 × 400 metres relay	M	9	12	8	5	10	3	2	11	6	1	7	4
4 × 400 metres relay	W	9	12	2	6	3	1	7	10	5	8	11	4
High jump	M	8	12	4	11	5	1	9	6	7	10	3	2
High jump	W	8.5	12	4	10	8.5	4	4	8.5	8.5	1.5	1.5	11
Pole vault	M	10	11	4.5	12	3	2	1	8	9	6.5	4.5	6.5
Pole vault	W	7	10	3	12	6	1.5	1.5	11	9	4	8	5
Long jump	M	7	11	2	12	9	5	8	4	10	6	3	1
Long jump	W	5	4	10	11	2	9	7	3	6	1	8	12
Triple jump	M	2	6	7	11	4	1	3	8	12	9	5	10
Triple jump	W	6	9	3	12	2	8	7	5	11	10	1	4
Shot put	M	3	12	8	7	4	6	9	0	10	11	2	5
Shot put	W	10	9	6	8	5	4	7	11	1	3	2	12
Discus throw	M	12	5	9	6	3	1	11	10	4	7	2	8
Discus throw	W	7	9	3	10	6	2	12	8	11	5	1	4
Hammer throw	M	3	12	5	11	8	10	4	0	9	6	7	0
Hammer throw	W	7	12	9	10	3	2	1	4	8	11	6	5
Javelin throw	M	6	11	12	9	1	10	8	4	3	7	2	5
Javelin throw	W	3	12	1	10	2	11	8	5	9	6	4	7
Country		BEL	CZE	EST	GRE	IRL	LAT	LTU	NED	POR	ROU	CHE	TUR
Total													

=== Final standings ===
Pos	Country	Pts	Note
1	Czech Republic	351	Champion and promoted to 2017 Super League
2	Greece	327	Promoted to 2017 Super League
3	Netherlands	299.5	Promoted to 2017 Super League
4	Belgium	276.5	
5	Portugal	270.5	
6	Ireland	261.5	
7	Turkey	260	
8	Switzerland	239.5	
9	Romania	226.5	
10	Estonia	216	
11	Lithuania	214.5	Relegated to 2017 Second League
12	Latvia	169.5	Relegated to 2017 Second League

== Second League ==
Place: Stara Zagora (Bulgaria)

As the 2017 Second League will feature 12 teams, no teams were relegated this year.

=== Participating countries ===
- Bulgaria
- Croatia
- Cyprus
- Denmark
- Hungary
- Iceland
- Serbia
- Slovenia
- Hungary and Slovenia were relegated from 2014 First League.
- Cyprus and Iceland were promoted from 2014 Third League.

=== Men's events ===
Event	Gold		Silver		Bronze	
100 m	Denis Dimitrov; Bulgaria	10.34	Dávid Ónodi; Hungary	10.59	Zvonimir Ivašković; Croatia	10.70
200 m	Denis Dimitrov; Bulgaria	21.38	Dávid Ónodi; Hungary	21.39	Kolbeinn Höður Gunnarsson; Iceland	21.63
400 m	Nick Ekelund-Arenander; Denmark	46.32	Krasimir Braikov; Bulgaria	46.90	Kolbeinn Höður Gunnarsson; Iceland	47.52
800 m	Andreas Bube; Denmark	1:50.38	Rudolf Kralj; Croatia	1:50.97	Christos Demetriou; Cyprus	1:51.07
1500 m	Mitko Tsenov; Bulgaria	3:46.31	Andreas Bueno; Denmark	3:46.35	Tamás Kazi; Hungary	3:46.46
3000 m	Mads Tærsbøi; Denmark	8:29.09	Goran Nava; Serbia	8:29.66	Dino Bošnjak; Croatia	8:30.86
5000 m	Thijs Nijhuis; Denmark	14:28.66	Hlynur Andrésson; Iceland	14:46.79	Goran Grdenic; Croatia	14:54.31
3000 m steeplechase	Mitko Tsenov; Bulgaria	9:07.37	Áron Dani; Hungary	9:12.43	Kasper Skov; Denmark	9:23.07
110 m hurdles	Andreas Martinsen; Denmark	13.71	Balázs Baji; Hungary	13.71	Milan Trajkovic; Cyprus	13.82
400 m hurdles	Nicolai Hartling; Denmark	50.16 NR	Tibor Koroknai; Hungary	51.06	Yann Senjaric; Croatia	51.24
4 × 100 m	Zalán Kádasi; Dávid Ónodi; János Sipos; Dániel Ecseki; Hungary	39.88	Festus Asante; Nick Ekelund-Arenander; Nicklas Hyde; Frederik Thomsen; Denmark	40.40	Petar Peev; Borislav Tonev; Georgi Ganchev; Denis Dimitrov; Bulgaria	40.62
4 × 400 m	Nicolai Hartling; Nicklas Hyde; Frederic Peschardt; Nick Ekelund-Arenander; Denmark	3:08.01	Zhivko Stoyanov; Yuri Bozherianov; Simeon Gerinski; Krasimir Braikov; Bulgaria	3:11.06	Hrvoje Čukman; Mateo Ružić; Petar Melnjak; Željko Vincek; Croatia	3:11.19
High jump	Janick Klausen; Denmark	2.24	Péter Bakosi; Hungary	2.20	Vasilios Constantinou; Cyprus	2.15
Pole vault	Ivan Horvat; Croatia	5.40	Rasmus Wejnold Jørgensen; Denmark	5.20	Nikandros Stylianou; Cyprus	5.20
Long jump	Marko Prugovečki; Croatia	7.65	Denis Eradiri; Bulgaria	7.56	Benjamin Gabrielsen; Denmark	7.52
Triple jump	Georgi Tsonov; Bulgaria	16.36	Zacharias Arnos; Cyprus	15.75	Dávid László; Hungary	15.09
Shot put	Asmir Kolašinac; Serbia	20.75	Georgi Ivanov; Bulgaria	20.18	Ódinn Björn Thorsteinsson; Iceland	18.55
Discus	Zoltán Kővágó; Hungary	64.73	Roland Varga; Croatia	62.00	Apostolos Parellis; Cyprus	60.27
Hammer	Krisztián Pars; Hungary	77.27	Nejc Pleško; Slovenia	70.87	Aykhan Apti; Bulgaria	70.02
Javelin	Vedran Samac; Serbia	79.52	Matija Muhar; Slovenia	76.97	Gudmundur Sverrisson; Iceland	69.66
WR world record | AR area record | CR championship record | GR games record | NR national record | OR Olympic record | PB personal best | SB season best | WL world leading (in a given season)

=== Women's events ===
Event	Gold		Silver		Bronze	
100 m	Ivet Lalova; Bulgaria	11.11; CR	Ramona Papaioannou; Cyprus	11.36	Andrea Ivančević; Croatia	11.49
200 m	Ivet Lalova; Bulgaria	22.90	Eleni Artymata; Cyprus	23.60	Lucija Pokos; Croatia	24.06
400 m	Tamara Salaški; Serbia	53.29	Maja Pogorevic; Slovenia	53.90	Hafdís Sigurdardóttir; Iceland	54.13
800 m	Amela Terzić; Serbia	1:59.90 NR	Aníta Hinriksdóttir; Iceland	2:03.17	Natalia Evangelidou; Cyprus	2:04.34
1500 m	Amela Terzić; Serbia	4:16.13	Natalia Evangelidou; Cyprus	4:18.33	Maria Larsen; Denmark	4:19.90
3000 m	Sonja Stolić; Serbia	9:19.88	Matea Parlov; Croatia	9:25.39	Militsa Mircheva; Bulgaria	9:27.75
5000 m	Militsa Mircheva; Bulgaria	16:30.14	Anna Emilie Møller; Denmark	16:39.03	Teodora Simović; Serbia	16:49.93
3000 m steeplechase	Silvia Danekova; Bulgaria	9:43.34	Viktória Gyürkés; Hungary	10:20.56	Simone Glad; Denmark	10:36.23
100 m hurdles	Andrea Ivančević; Croatia	13.38	Joni Tomičić Prezelj; Slovenia	13.84	Natalia Christofi; Cyprus	13.98
400 m hurdles	Sara Petersen; Denmark	55.13 NR	Vania Stambolova; Bulgaria	58.56	Arna Stefanía Gudmundsdóttir; Iceland	58.79
4 × 100 m	Olivia Fotopoulou; Ramona Papaioannou; Demetra Kyriakidou; Eleni Artymata; Cyprus	44.75 NR	Fanni Schmelcz; Éva Kaptur; Fanni Reizinger; Anasztázia Nguyen; Hungary	44.83	Zorana Barjaktarovic; Maja Ciric; Katarina Sirmić; Milana Tirnanić; Serbia	45.58
4 × 400 m	Nadezhda Racheva; Vania Stambolova; Karin Okoliye; Katya Hristova; Bulgaria	3:38.78	Anne Sofie Kirkegaard; Anna Thestrup Andersen; Mette Graversgaard; Sara Petersen; Denmark	3:41.06	Dora Filipović; Marija Hižman; Wanda Haber; Kristina Dudek; Croatia	3:42.98
High jump	Mirela Demireva; Bulgaria	1.91	Barbara Szabó; Hungary	1.88	Sandra Christensen; Denmark	1.75
Pole vault	Iben Høgh-Pedersen; Denmark	4.00	Fanni Juhász; Hungary; Hulda Thorsteinsdóttir; Iceland	4.00		
Long jump	Hafdís Sigurðardóttir; Iceland	6.45 =NR	Nektaria Panagi; Cyprus	6.31	Andriana Banova; Bulgaria	6.17
Triple jump	Gabriela Petrova; Bulgaria	14.85 w	Saša Babšek; Slovenia	13.58	Janne Nielsen; Denmark	13.29
Shot put	Anita Márton; Hungary	18.36	Radoslava Mavrodieva; Bulgaria	17.84	Trine Mulbjerg; Denmark	16.38
Discus	Dragana Tomašević; Serbia	58.16	Anita Márton; Hungary	56.13	Androniki Lada; Cyprus	51.36
Hammer	Barbara Špiler; Slovenia	63.80	Sara Savatović; Serbia	62.37	Celina Julin; Denmark	60.81
Javelin	Ásdís Hjálmsdóttir; Iceland	60.06	Marija Vučenović; Serbia	52.65	Annabella Bogdán; Hungary	52.29
WR world record | AR area record | CR championship record | GR games record | NR national record | OR Olympic record | PB personal best | SB season best | WL world leading (in a given season)

=== Score table ===
Event		BUL	CRO	CYP	DEN	HUN	ISL	SRB	SLO
100 metres	M	8	6	5	4	7	3	1.5	1.5
100 metres	W	8	6	7	3	5	2	4	1
200 metres	M	8	4	3	5	7	6	2	1
200 metres	W	8	6	7	4	5	1	3	2
400 metres	M	7	4	1	8	3	6	5	2
400 metres	W	3	5	2	4	1	6	8	7
800 metres	M	2	7	6	8	3	4	5	1
800 metres	W	4	1	6	3	5	7	8	2
1500 metres	M	8	4	0	7	6	3	5	2
1500 metres	W	5	4	7	6	3	1	8	2
3000 metres	M	4	6	0	8	3	5	7	2
3000 metres	W	6	7	4	5	3	2	8	1
5000 metres	M	1	6	4	8	5	7	3	2
5000 metres	W	8	4	2	7	5	1	6	3
3000 metre steeplechase	M	8	1	4	6	7	5	2	3
3000 metre steeplechase	W	8	3	2	6	7	4	5	0
110/100 metre hurdles	M	4	2	6	8	7	3	5	1
110/100 metre hurdles	W	5	8	6	4	0	2	3	7
400 metre hurdles	M	3	6	0	8	7	2	5	4
400 metre hurdles	W	7	2	4	8	5	6	1	3
4 × 100 metres relay	M	6	1	2	7	8	5	4	3
4 × 100 metres relay	W	0	5	8	3	7	4	6	2
4 × 400 metres relay	M	7	6	1	8	5	4	3	2
4 × 400 metres relay	W	8	6	2	7	3	1	4	5
High jump	M	5	0	6	8	7	3	4	2
High jump	W	8	2	2	6	7	2	4	5
Pole vault	M	3	8	6	7	5	4	2	0
Pole vault	W	1	3	4	8	6.5	6.5	2	5
Long jump	M	7	8	4	6	5	1	3	2
Long jump	W	6	5	7	4	1	8	2	3
Triple jump	M	8	4	7	3	6	1	2	5
Triple jump	W	8	5	1	6	4	3	2	7
Shot put	M	7	4	1	3	2	6	8	5
Shot put	W	7	1	4	6	8	5	3	2
Discus throw	M	4	7	6	1	8	5	2	3
Discus throw	W	3	1	6	5	7	4	8	1
Hammer throw	M	6	5	0	3	8	0	4	7
Hammer throw	W	3	0	5	6	0	4	7	8
Javelin throw	M	4	1	2	3	5	6	8	7
Javelin throw	W	2	3	1	4	6	8	7	5
Country		BUL	CRO	CYP	DEN	HUN	ISL	SRB	SLO
Total		218	167	151	224	202.5	156.5	179.5	127.5

=== Final standings ===
Pos	Country	Pts	Note
1	Denmark	224	Champions and promoted to 2017 First League
2	Bulgaria	218	Promoted to 2017 First League
3	Hungary	202.5	
4	Serbia	179.5	
5	Croatia	167	
6	Iceland	156.5	
7	Cyprus	151	
8	Slovenia	127.5	

== Third League ==
Place: Baku National Stadium, Baku, Azerbaijan

The third league of the 2015 European Athletics Team Championships will be a part of the 2015 European Games, held in Baku, Azerbaijan.

=== Participating countries ===
- AASSE
- Albania
- Andorra
- Armenia (forfait)
- Austria
- Azerbaijan
- Bosnia and Herzegovina
- Georgia
- Israel
- Luxembourg
- Macedonia
- Malta
- Moldova
- Montenegro
- Slovakia
- Austria and Slovakia were relegated from 2014 Second League.

=== Men's events ===
Event	Gold		Silver		Bronze	
100 m	Tomáš Benko; Slovakia	10.60	Riste Pandev; Macedonia	10.70; SB	Markus Fuchs; Austria	10.74
200 m	Ján Volko; Slovakia	21.08	Nika Karatavtsevi; Georgia	21.29; PB	Imri Persiado; Israel	21.30; PB
400 m	Donald Sanford; Israel	45.75	Alexandru Babian; Moldova	47.35; PB	Borislav Dragoljević; Bosnia and Herzegovina	47.89; PB
800 m	Amel Tuka; Bosnia and Herzegovina	1:50.16	Jozef Repčík; Slovakia	1:51.51	Ion Siuris; Moldova	1:51.91
1500 m	Hayle Ibrahimov; Azerbaijan	3:49.69	Jozef Pelikán; Slovakia	3:51.07	Andreas Vojta; Austria	3:51.28
3000 m	Hayle Ibrahimov; Azerbaijan	7:54.14	Brenton Jon Rowe; Austria	8:05.62; SB	Roman Prodius; Moldova	8:06.34; PB
5000 m	Hayle Ibrahimov; Azerbaijan	14:02.16	Roman Prodius; Moldova	14:21.42; PB	Haimro Alame; Israel	14:38.96
3000 m steeplechase	Nicolai Gorbușco; Moldova	8:49.83	Christian Steinhammer; Austria	8:53.98	Osman Junuzović; Bosnia and Herzegovina	8:54.55; PB
110 m hurdles	Dominik Siedlaczek; Austria	14.07; PB	Rahib Məmmədov; Azerbaijan	14.22; SB	Mahir Kurtalić; Bosnia and Herzegovina	14.43; PB
400 m hurdles	Martin Kučera; Slovakia	50.70	Thomas Kain; Austria	51.15; SB	Maor Seged; Israel	52.18; SB
4 × 100 m	Amir Hamidulin; Aviv Dayan; Amit Cohen; Imri Persiado; Israel	40.25	Christoph Haslauer; Markus Fuchs; Benjamin Grill; Ekemini Bassey; Austria	40.36	Denis Danáč; Roman Turčani; Ján Volko; Tomáš Benko; Slovakia	40.80
4 × 400 m	Lukáš Privalinec; Jozef Repčík; Denis Danáč; Martin Kučera; Slovakia	3:08.80	Rusmir Malkočević; Semir Avdić; Borislav Dragoljević; Amel Tuka; Bosnia and Herzegovina	3:10.50	Donald Sanford; Maor Seged; Aviv Dayan; Hai Cohen; Israel	3:11.09
High jump	Matúš Bubeník; Slovakia	2.26	Andrei Mîțîcov; Moldova	2.24 =PB	Dmitry Kroytor; Israel	2.20
Pole vault	Ján Zmoray; Slovakia	5.15	Paul Kilbertus; Austria	5.10 =SB	Etamar Bhastekar; Israel	5.00
Long jump	Bachana Khorava; Georgia	7.64	İzmir Smajlaj; Albania	7.52	Dominik Distelberger; Austria	7.30
Triple jump	Nazim Babayev; Azerbaijan	16.38	Vladimir Letnicov; Moldova	16.34 =SB	Tom Ya'acobov; Israel	15.87
Shot put	Hamza Alić; Bosnia and Herzegovina	20.26	Ivan Emilianov; Moldova	18.76	Lukas Weißhaidinger; Austria	18.48
Discus	Gerhard Mayer; Austria	59.48	Nicolai Ceban; Moldova	53.95	Kemal Mešić; Bosnia and Herzegovina	50.26
Hammer	Marcel Lomnický; Slovakia	75.41	Serghei Marghiev; Moldova	73.09	Dzmitry Marshin; Azerbaijan	72.79
Javelin	Patrik Žeňúch; Slovakia	74.89	Rostomi Tchintcharauli; Georgia	71.32; SB	Alan Ferber; Israel	70.18
WR world record | AR area record | CR championship record | GR games record | NR national record | OR Olympic record | PB personal best | SB season best | WL world leading (in a given season)

=== Women's events ===
Event	Gold		Silver		Bronze	
100 m	Olga Lenskiy; Israel	11.61	Charlotte Wingfield; Malta	11.69; NR	Lenka Krsakova; Slovakia	11.76
200 m	Olga Lenskiy; Israel	23.40	Alexandra Bezekova; Slovakia	23.72; PB	Viola Kleiser; Austria	23.85
400 m	Iveta Putalova; Slovakia	53.07	Susanne Walli; Austria	53.65; PB	Olesea Cojuhari; Moldova	54.20; SB
800 m	Charline Mathias; Luxembourg	2:01.77	Luiza Gega; Albania	2:02.36	Anastasiya Komarova; Azerbaijan	2:02.50; PB
1500 m	Luiza Gega; Albania	4:11.58	Maor Tiyouri; Israel	4:26.86; PB	Martine Nobili; Luxembourg	4:27.46
3000 m	Jennifer Wenth; Austria	9:11.98	Maor Tiyouri; Israel	9:32.11; PB	Bontu Megersa; Azerbaijan	9:42.14
5000 m	Anita Baierl; Austria	16:33.09	Bontu Megersa; Azerbaijan	16:44.57	Lucia Kimani; Bosnia and Herzegovina	16:47.13; SB
3000 m steeplechase^{[nb1]}	Olesea Smovjenco; Moldova	10:55.61; PB	Rahima Zukic; Bosnia and Herzegovina	10:59.76	Dana Levinn; Israel	11:02.57
100 m hurdles	Beate Schrott; Austria	13.18	Lucia Mokrasova; Slovakia	13.92; SB	Gorana Cvijetic; Bosnia and Herzegovina	14.11; SB
400 m hurdles	Verena Menapace; Austria	58.94	Kim Reuland; Luxembourg	59.80	Andrea Holleyova; Slovakia	59.81
4 × 100 m	Lenka Krsakova; Iveta Putalova; Jana Veldakova; Alexandra Bezekova; Slovakia	44.92	Dikla Goldenthal; Olga Lenskiy; Diana Vaisman; Efat Zelikovich; Israel	45.23	Eva-Maria Wimberger; Viola Kleiser; Alexandra Toth; Julia Schwarzinger; Austria	45.24
4 × 400 m	Silvia Salgovicova; Alexandra Stukova; Alexandra Bezekova; Iveta Putalova; Slovakia	3:35.03	Julia Schwarzinger; Susanne Walli; Verena Menapace; Carina Schrempf; Austria	3:37.51	Alina Bordea; Vergilia Rotaru; Anna Berghii; Olesea Cojuhari; Moldova	3:41.94
High jump	Marija Vuković; Montenegro	1.86	Valentyna Liashenko; Georgia	1.84; SB	Maayan Shahaf; Israel	1.84
Pole vault	Kira Grünberg; Austria	4.35	Gina Reuland; Luxembourg	4.20	Olga Dogadko Bronshtein; Israel	3.70; SB
Long jump	Jana Veldakova; Slovakia	6.68	Rebecca Camilleri; Malta	6.38; SB	Sarah Lagger; Austria	6.17
Triple jump	Hanna Knyazyeva-Minenko; Israel	14.41	Dana Veldakova; Slovakia	13.95; SB	Yekaterina Sariyeva; Azerbaijan	13.27
Shot put	Kristina Rakocevic; Montenegro	14.85	Dimitriana Surdu; Moldova	14.34	Anastasiya Muchkayev; Israel	14.30
Discus	Natalia Stratulat; Moldova	55.08	Kristina Rakocevic; Montenegro	53.91; NR	Hanna Skydan; Azerbaijan	49.50; PB
Hammer	Martina Hrasnova; Slovakia	69.31	Hanna Skydan; Azerbaijan	68.32	Marina Nichisenco; Moldova	65.08
Javelin	Marharyta Dorozhon; Israel	58.00	Elisabeth Eberl; Austria	49.45	Mihaela Tacu; Moldova	46.55
WR world record | AR area record | CR championship record | GR games record | NR national record | OR Olympic record | PB personal best | SB season best | WL world leading (in a given season)

- ^{nb1} The original women's steeplechase winner, Chaltu Beji of Azerbaijan, was disqualified after giving a positive doping test for ostarine.

=== Score table ===
Event		AASSE	ALB	AND	AUT	AZE	BIH	GEO	ISR	LUX	MKD	MLT	MDA	MNE	SVK
100 metres	M	2	0	3	12	11	4	8	10	5	13	6	7	9	14
100 metres	W	1	6	7	11	9	4	5	14	10	2	13	8	3	12
200 metres	M	1	4	3	7	10	6	13	12	2	8	5	9	11	14
200 metres	W	1	4	5	12	8	7	6	14	10	2	11	9	3	13
400 metres	M	2	7	1	11	10	12	8	14	3	6	5	13	4	9
400 metres	W	3	4	1	13	10	9	7	8	6	5	11	12	2	14
800 metres	M	9	11	6	8	7	14	5	10	4	1	3	12	2	13
800 metres	W	1	13	4	11	12	8	5	7	14	2	6	9	3	10
1500 metres	M	7	0	5	12	14	10	3	9	8	2	4	11	6	13
1500 metres	W	1	14	6	11	8	9	7	13	12	2	4	5	3	10
3000 metres	M	8	2	4	13	14	6	5	9	11	3	7	12	1	10
3000 metres	W	5	0	4	14	12	11	2	13	8	3	6	7	9	10
5000 metres	M	0	9	5	11	14	2	8	12	6	4	7	13	3	10
5000 metres	W	5	0	0	14	13	12	7	9	10	0	6	4	8	11
3000 metre steeplechase	M	0	10	5	13	6	12	9	11	4	3	7	14	2	8
3000 metre steeplechase	W	0	0	0	10	14	12	8	11	6	0	7	13	5	9
110/100 metre hurdles	M	0	0	5	14	13	12	8	10	11	6	0	9	0	7
110/100 metre hurdles	W	0	0	4	14	9	12	0	10	11	5	7	8	6	13
400 metre hurdles	M	9	0	3	13	7	10	5	12	8	4	0	11	6	14
400 metre hurdles	W	0	3	2	14	6	9	5	10	13	8	7	11	4	12
4 × 100 metres relay	M	4	0	5	13	10	7	9	14	6	0	0	8	11	12
4 × 100 metres relay	W	0	0	7	12	11	8	0	13	0	0	10	9	6	14
4 × 400 metres relay	M	0	0	3	8	11	13	9	12	6	4	5	7	10	14
4 × 400 metres relay	W	0	0	5	13	10	8	7	0	11	6	9	12	0	14
High jump	M	9	0	4	10	8	6	11	12	7	2	4	13	4	14
High jump	W	0	0	8.5	7	6	11	13	12	10	4	3	5	14	8.5
Pole vault	M	0	0	10	13	0	7	6	12	11	0	5	9	8	14
Pole vault	W	9	0	5.5	14	11	0	7	12	13	0	5.5	8	0	10
Long jump	M	5	13	1	12	8	4	14	11	6	3	10	2	7	9
Long jump	W	0	3	4	12	10	7	11	0	8	6	13	9	5	14
Triple jump	M	5	10	2	8	14	4	11	12	3	0	7	13	6	9
Triple jump	W	0	0	7	11	12	6	10	14	4	3	8	9	5	13
Shot put	M	0	6	2	12	7	14	4	8	11	3	5	13	9	10
Shot put	W	0	0	3	7	10	8	6	12	9	5	4	13	14	11
Discus throw	M	0	0	3	14	6	12	7	11	9	4	5	13	10	8
Discus throw	W	7	0	2	10	12	9	4	11	6	5	3	14	13	8
Hammer throw	M	0	0	4	11	12	5	10	9	8	3	7	13	6	14
Hammer throw	W	0	0	7	10	13	9	0	11	8	4	5	12	6	14
Javelin throw	M	0	0	3	10	4	7	13	12	9	5	8	11	6	14
Javelin throw	W	4	0	2	13	5	11	7	14	9	3	6	12	10	8
Country		AASSE	ALB	AND	AUT	AZE	BIH	GEO	ISR	LUX	MKD	MLT	MDA	MNE	SVK
Total		99	115	162	458	387	337	283	430	317	143	244.5	401	237	458.5

=== Final standings ===
Pos	Country	Pts	Note
1	Slovakia	458.5	Champions and Promoted to 2017 Second League
2	Austria	458	Promoted to 2017 Second League
3	Israel	430	Promoted to 2017 Second League
4	Moldova	401	Promoted to 2017 Second League
5	Azerbaijan	387	
6	Bosnia and Herzegovina	337	
7	Luxembourg	317	
8	Georgia	283	
9	Malta	244.5	
10	Montenegro	237	
11	Andorra	162	
12	Macedonia	143	
13	Albania	115	
14	AASSE	99	
