= Yadisleidy Pedroso =

Cuban-born Italian hurdler

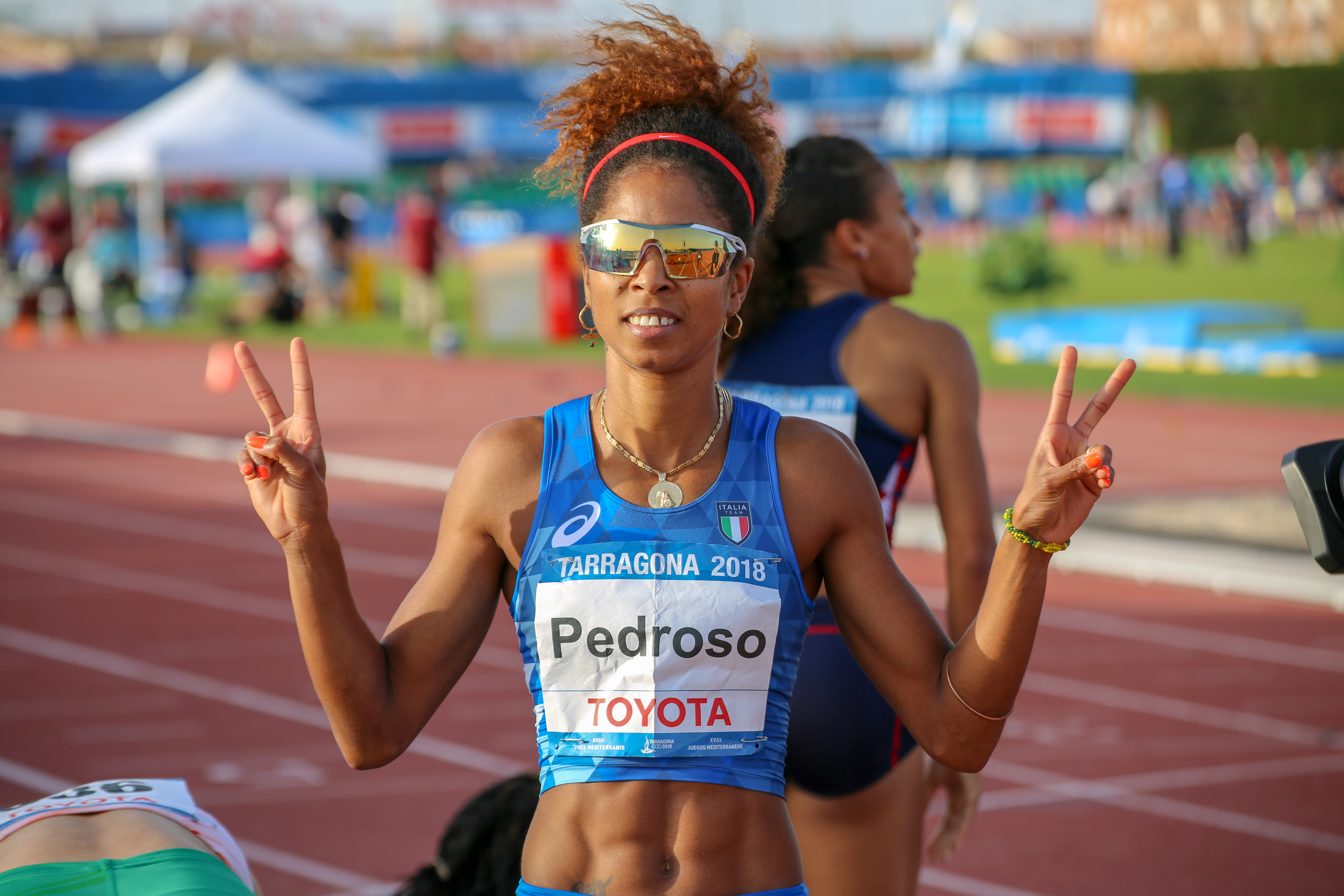
- Yadisleidy Pedroso in 2018

Personal information
- Full name: Yadisleidis Pedroso González
- Nickname: Yadis
- Nationality: Italian
- Born: 28 January 1987 (age 39) Havana, Cuba
- Height: 1.70 m (5 ft 7 in)
- Weight: 50 kg (110 lb)

Sport
- Country: Italy
- Sport: Athletics
- Event: 400 metres hurdles
- Club: CUS Pisa Atletica Cascina
- Coached by: Massimo Matrone

Achievements and titles
- Personal best: 400 m hs: 54.54 (2013)
Medal record
Representing Cuba
CAC Championships
| Silver medal – second place | 2009 Havana | 400 m hs |
Representing Italy
European Team Championships
| Silver medal – second place | 2017 Lille | 400 m hs |
| Bronze medal – third place | 2015 Cheboksary | 400 m hs |
Mediterranean Games
| Gold medal – first place | 2018 Tarragona | 400 m hs |

Yadisleidy Pedroso (Havana, 28 January 1987) is an Italian hurdler. She competed at the 2020 Summer Olympics, in 400 m hurdles.

== Biography ==
She has been an Italian citizen from 7 February 2013, but she was unable compete for the Italian national athletics team before 13 December 2013. Pedroso formerly represented Cuba and became an Italian citizen through her marriage to her coach Massimo Matrone.

== National records ==
Italian records in athletics

- 400 metres hurdles: 54.54 ( (China) Shanghai, 18 May 2013)

== Achievements ==
| Year | Competition | Venue | Position | Event | Notes |
Representing Cuba
| 2009 | ALBA Games | Havana, Cuba | 1st | 400 m hurdles | 58.23 |
| 2009 | Central American and Caribbean Championships | Havana, Cuba | 2nd | 400 m hurdles | 57.73 |
Representing Italy
| 2014 | European Championships | Zurich, Switzerland | 5th | 400 m hurdles | 55.90 |
| 2015 | European Team Championships | Cheboksary, Russia | 3rd | 400 m hurdles | 55.18 |
| 2016 | Olympic Games | Rio de Janeiro, Brazil | 12th | 400 m hurdles | 55.78 |
| 2017 | European Team Championships | Lille, France | 2nd | 400 m hurdles | 55.39 |
| 2017 | World Championships | London, United Kingdom | 13th (sf) | 400 m hurdles | 55.95 |
| 2018 | Mediterranean Games | Tarragona, Spain | 1st | 400 m hurdles | 55.40 |
| 2018 | European Championships | Berlin, Germany | 5th | 400 m hurdles | 55.80 |
| 2019 | World Championships | Doha, Qatar | 15th (sf) | 400 m hurdles | 55.40 |
| 2021 | Olympic Games | Tokyo, Japan | 16th (sf) | 400 m hurdles | 55.80 |

== National titles ==
He won five national championships.

- Italian Athletics Championships
  - 400 metres hurdles: 2013, 2014, 2015, 2017, 2018

== See also ==
- Italian records in athletics
- Italian all-time lists - 400 metres hurdles
- List of eligibility transfers in athletics
