= Nataliya Strohova =

Ukrainian sprinter

Personal information
- Born: 26 December 1992 (age 33)

Sport
- Country: Ukraine
- Sport: Track and field
- Event: 200 metres
Medal record
Women's athletics
Representing Ukraine
European Team Championships
Gold medal – first place	2015 Cheboksary	4x100 m relay

Nataliya Strohova (born 26 December 1992) is a Ukrainian sprinter. She competed in the 200 metres event at the 2015 World Championships in Athletics in Beijing, China.
