= Mariya Mikhailyuk =

Russian sprinter

Personal information
- Born: 29 January 1991 (age 35)

Sport
- Country: Russia
- Sport: Track and field
- Event: 400 metres

Mariya Mikhailyuk (born 29 January 1991) is a Russian sprinter. She competed in the 400 metres event at the 2015 World Championships in Athletics in Beijing, China.
