= Enrico Demonte =

Italian sprinter

Personal information
- Nationality: Italian
- Born: 25 September 1988 (age 37) Genoa, Italy
- Height: 1.80 m (5 ft 11 in)
- Weight: 73 kg (161 lb)

Sport
- Country: Italy
- Sport: Athletics
- Event: Sprint
- Club: G.S. Fiamme Oro
- Coached by: Umberto Pegoraro

Achievements and titles
- Personal bests: 100 m: 10.28 (2014); 200 m: 20.45 (2013)

Enrico Demonte (born 25 September 1988) is a former Italian sprinter.

== Biography ==
On 7 July 2013 Enrico Demonte ran the 200 metres in La Chaux-de-Fonds, Suisse in the time of 20.45, that in addition to being the eighth-best performance all-time Italian on the distance, is also the granting of Standard's A (20:52) for participation at the 2013 World Championships in Athletics.

== Achievements ==
Year	Competition	Venue	Position	Event	Time	Notes
2007	European junior Championships	(Netherlands) Hengelo	Qual	200 metres	21.36	

== See also ==
- Italian all-time lists - 200 metres
- Italy at the 2013 World Championships in Athletics
