= 2014 Mediterranean Athletics U23 Championships – Results =

Listed below are the official results of the 2014 Mediterranean Athletics U23 Championships which took place on 14–15 June 2014 in Aubagne, France.

== Men's results ==
=== 100 metres ===
Heats
Wind: Heat 1: +3.0 m/s / Heat 2: +2.8 m/s

Rank	Heat	Name	Nationality	Time	Notes
1	1	Ken Romain	France	10.35	Q
2	2	Adriá Burriel	Spain	10.38	Q
3	2	Lorenzo Bilotti	Italy	10.39	Q
4	2	Stuart Dutamby	France	10.40	Q
5	1	Aykut Ay	Turkey	10.41	Q
6	1	Federico Cattaneo	Italy	10.54	Q
7	1	Blaž Brulc	Slovenia	10.59	Q
8	1	Alberto Gavaldá	Spain	10.69	Q
9	2	Steve Camilleri	Malta	10.89	
10	2	Riste Pandev	Macedonia	10.90	

Final
Wind: +1.7 m/s

Rank	Name	Nationality	Time
1st place, gold medalist(s)	Ken Romain	France	10.29
2nd place, silver medalist(s)	Lorenzo Bilotti	Italy	10.33
3rd place, bronze medalist(s)	Adriá Burriel	Spain	10.34
4	Aykut Ay	Turkey	10.44
5	Stuart Dutamby	France	10.47
6	Blaž Brulc	Slovenia	10.63
7	Alberto Gavaldá	Spain	10.68
8	Federico Cattaneo	Italy	10.72

=== 200 metres ===
Heats
Wind: Heat 1: +2.1 m/s / Heat 2: +2.9 m/s

Rank	Heat	Name	Nationality	Time	Notes
1	1	Vincent Pierre	France	20.47	Q
2	1	Eseosa Desalu	Italy	20.67	Q
3	2	Jeffrey John	France	20.63	Q
4	1	Fatim Aktas	Turkey	21.02	Q
5	2	Lamont Marcell Jacobs	Italy	21.11	Q
6	2	Yiğitcan Hekimoğlu	Turkey	21.57	Q
7	1	Oscar Husillos	Spain	21.85	Q
8	2	Steve Camilleri	Malta	22.25	
-	1	Ahac Moretti	Slovenia	DNF	
-	1	Ricardo Santos	Portugal	DQ	
-	2	Adria Burriel	Spain	DQ	
-	2	Haddad Noureddine	Lebanon	DNS	

Final
Wind: +0.2 m/s

Rank	Name	Nationality	Time
1st place, gold medalist(s)	Jeffrey John	France	20.63
2nd place, silver medalist(s)	Eseosa Desalu	Italy	20.78
3rd place, bronze medalist(s)	Vincent Pierre	France	20.87
4	Fatim Aktas	Turkey	21.24
5	Lamont Marcell Jacobs	Italy	21.26
6	Oscar Husillos	Spain	21.75
7	Yiğitcan Hekimoğlu	Turkey	21.98

=== 400 metres ===
Heats

Rank	Heat	Name	Nationality	Time	Notes
1	2	Thomas Jordier	France	46.38	Q
2	2	Mateo Ruzic	Croatia	46.83	Q
3	2	Davide Re	Italy	47.11	Q
4	2	Bertran Alcaraz	Spain	47.20	q
5	2	Batuhan Altıntaş	Turkey	47.25	q
6	1	Bastien Mandrou	France	47.32	Q
7	1	Halit Kılıç	Turkey	47.54	Q
8	1	Michele Tricca	Italy	47.69	Q
9	1	Lucas Bua	Spain	48.24	
-	1	Georgios Avraam	Cyprus	DQ	
-	2	Noureddine Haddad	Lebanon	DNS	

Final

Rank	Name	Nationality	Time
1st place, gold medalist(s)	Thomas Jordier	France	46.42
2nd place, silver medalist(s)	Davide Re	Italy	46.49
3rd place, bronze medalist(s)	Mateo Ruzic	Croatia	46.51
4	Bastien Mandrou	France	46.89
5	Batuhan Altıntaş	Turkey	46.95
6	Halit Kılıç	Turkey	47.05
7	Michele Tricca	Italy	47.38
8	Bertran Alcaraz	Spain	47.52

=== 800 metres ===
Rank	Name	Nationality	Time
1st place, gold medalist(s)	Daniel Andújar	Spain	1:50.16
2nd place, silver medalist(s)	Leo Morgana	France	1:50.23
3rd place, bronze medalist(s)	Hasan Basri Güdük	Turkey	1:50.42
4	Soufiane El Kabbouri	Italy	1:50.52
5	Gaëtan Manceaux	France	1:50.76
6	Jacopo Lahbi	Italy	1:50.95
7	Alejandro Estévez	Spain	1:51.19

=== 1500 metres ===
Rank	Name	Nationality	Time
1st place, gold medalist(s)	Marc Alcalá	Spain	3:51.47
2nd place, silver medalist(s)	Abdikadar Sheikh Ali	Italy	3:51.95
3rd place, bronze medalist(s)	Antoine Martinet	France	3:52.29
4	Joao Bussotti	Italy	3:52.67
5	Süleyman Bekmezci	Turkey	3:53.01
6	Abdessalem Ayouni	Tunisia	3:55.03
7	Yimer Getahun	Israel	3:55.06

=== 5000 metres ===
Rank	Name	Nationality	Time
1st place, gold medalist(s)	Rui Pinto	Portugal	14:11.58
2nd place, silver medalist(s)	Suat Kabulakra	Turkey	14:32.65
3rd place, bronze medalist(s)	Sonmez Dag	Turkey	14:43.72

=== 10000 metres ===
Rank	Name	Nationality	Time
1st place, gold medalist(s)	Seref Dirli	Turkey	30:47,27
2nd place, silver medalist(s)	Youssef Mekdagou	France	30:52.54
3rd place, bronze medalist(s)	Houssame Benabbou	Spain	30:54.06
4	Daniele D'Onofrio	Italy	31:32.88
5	Demeke Teshale	Israel	32:37.67
6	Maxime Selderon	France	33:01.83
-	Suat Kabulakra	Turkey	AB
-	Ángel Ronco	Spain	AB
-	Maru Teferi	Israel	AB

=== 110 metres hurdles ===
Wind: +0.2 m/s

Rank	Name	Nationality	Time
1st place, gold medalist(s)	Simon Krauss	France	13.64
2nd place, silver medalist(s)	Aurel Manga	France	13.76
3rd place, bronze medalist(s)	Javier Colomo	Spain	13.86
4	Hassane Fofana	Italy	13.88
5	Lorenzo Perini	Italy	13.89
6	Andre Costa	Portugal	14.31
7	Samir Akovali	Turkey	14.54
-	Milan Trajkovic	Cyprus	DQ

=== 400 metre hurdles ===
Rank	Name	Nationality	Time
1st place, gold medalist(s)	Stephane Yato	France	51.12
2nd place, silver medalist(s)	Sayeh Riadh	Tunisia	51.56
3rd place, bronze medalist(s)	Sergio Fernández	Spain	51.59
4	Enis Ünsal	Turkey	53.66

=== 3000 metre steeplechase ===
Rank	Name	Nationality	Time
1st place, gold medalist(s)	Fernando Carro	Spain	9:02.11
2nd place, silver medalist(s)	Jorge Blanco	Spain	9:02.70
3rd place, bronze medalist(s)	Giuseppe Gerratana	Italy	9:02.88
4	Ala Zoghlami	Italy	9:03.57
5	Djilali Bedrani	France	9:09.08
6	Miguel Borges	Portugal	9:14.08
7	Ersin Tekal	Turkey	9:15.64
8	Fernando Serrão	Portugal	9:18.13
9	Gatien Airiau	France	9:19.08
10	Davorin Cimermančič	Slovenia	9:33.58
11	Muhammet Emin Tan	Turkey	9:57.51
12	Malek Ben Amor	Tunisia	DNS

=== 10,000 metres walk ===
Rank	Name	Nationality	Time
1st place, gold medalist(s)	Álvaro Martín	Spain	42:50.87
2nd place, silver medalist(s)	Marc Tur	Spain	42:52.19
3rd place, bronze medalist(s)	Francesco Fortunato	Italy	42:54.52
4	Muratcan Karapınar	Turkey	43:03.74
5	Francisco Durán	Spain	43:12.09
6	Leonardo Dei Tos	Italy	43:16.83
7	Vito Minei	Italy	43:34.45
8	Miguel Carvalho	Portugal	43:56.88
9	Hugo Andrieu	France	44:48.82
10	Aurélien Quinion	France	46:19.00
-	Sahin Senocuncu	Turkey	DQ

=== 4x100 m relay ===
Rank	Nation	Team	Time
1st place, gold medalist(s)	Italy	Alberto Boretti / Eseosa Desalu / Giacomo Tortu / Lorenzo Bilotti	39,99
2nd place, silver medalist(s)	Turkey	Miklat Kaya / Yigitcan Hekimoglu / Fatim Aktas / Aykut Ay	41.59
-	Spain	Alejandro David / Alberto Gavaldá / Adria Burriel / Mario López Moure	DNF
-	France	Pierre Vicent / Aurel Manga / Ken Romain / Stuart Dutamby	DQ

=== 4x400 m relay ===
Rank	Nation	Team	Time
1st place, gold medalist(s)	France	Ijacques François / Léo Morgana / Bastien Mandrou / Pierre Chalus	3:07.20
2nd place, silver medalist(s)	Italy	Paolo Danesini / Matteo Lachini / Marco Lorenzi / Davide Re	3:08.24
3rd place, bronze medalist(s)	Spain	Julio Arenas / Bertrán Alcaraz / Lucas Búa / Daniel Andújar	3:08.46
4	Turkey	Batutan Altuntas / Halit Kılıç / Hasan Basri Güdük / Abdullah Tutuneu	3:13.76

=== High jump ===
Rank	Athlete	Nationality	1.95	2.00	2.05	2.09	2.12	2.15	2.18	2.21	Result
1st place, gold medalist(s)	Vasilios Konstantinou	Cyprus	-	o	o	o	o	o	o	xxx	2.18
2nd place, silver medalist(s)	Paulo Conceição	Portugal	-	-	-	xo	xo	o	xxx		2.15
3rd place, bronze medalist(s)	Eugenio Rossi	San Marino	o	o	o	xo	xo	xo	xxx		2.15
4	Gianmarco Tamberi	Italy	o	o	o	xo	xo	xxx			2.12
5	Eugenio Meloni	Italy	o	o	o	xxx					2.09
6	Clément Gicquel	France	-	xo	xxo	xxx					2.09
7	Joris Chapon	France	-	xo	-	xxx					2.05
-	Ibrahim Halil Sağlam	Turkey	xxx								NM

=== Pole vault ===
Rank	Athlete	Nationality	4.52	4.82	5.02	5.17	5.32	5.42	5.52	5.57	5.72	5.85	Result
1st place, gold medalist(s)	Kevin Menaldo	France	-	-	-	-	o	-	xxo	-	xo	xxx	5.72
2nd place, silver medalist(s)	Didac Salas	Spain	-	-	-	o	-	xo	-	o	xxx		5.57
3rd place, bronze medalist(s)	Ivan Horvat	Croatia	-	o	xo	o	o	o	xxx				5.42
4	Medhi Amar-Rouana	France	-	xxo	o	xo	xxx						5.17
5	Lev Skorish	Israel	-	xo	xo	xxo	xxx						5.17
6	Mohamed Amine Romadhana	Turkey	-	xxo	xo	xxo	xxx						5.17
7	Alessandro Sinno	Italy	-	-	o	xxx							5.02
8	Miquel Vilchez	Andorra	o	xxo	xxx								4.82
9	Umit Sungur	Turkey	xxo	xxx									4.52
-	Eloi Guimera	Spain	-	xxx									NM
-	Simone Fusiani	Italy	-	-	xxx								NM

=== Long jump ===
Rank	Athlete	Nationality	#1	#2	#3	#4	#5	#6	Result
1st place, gold medalist(s)	Alper Kulaksız	Turkey	7.52	7.83	7.52	7.55	x	7.75	7.83
2nd place, silver medalist(s)	Raihau Maiau	France	7.69	x	x	x	7.68	7.76	7.76
3rd place, bronze medalist(s)	Anastásios Galazoulas	Greece	7.44	7.33	7.40	x	7.61	7.49	7.61
4	Musa Tüzen	Turkey	X	X	X	X	X	7.54	7.54
5	Sanjin Šimić	Croatia	7.52	7.28	7.43	5.83	7.33	6.90	7.52
6	Stefano Braga	Italy	X	X	7.05	7.29	7.19	7.47	7.47
7	Sergio Ripodas	Spain	X	X	7.27	7.35	X	7.36	7.36
8	Florent Szezesny	France	7.29	X	7.29	5.90	X	-	7.29
-	Rodrigo de la Oliva	Spain							DNS

=== Triple jump ===
Rank	Athlete	Nationality	#1	#2	#3	#4	#5	#6	Result
1st place, gold medalist(s)	Pablo Torrijos	Spain	x	x	15.9	16.24	16.06	16.32	16.32
2nd place, silver medalist(s)	Daniele Cavazzani	Italy	5.97	x	x	15.69	15.80	16.12	16.12
3rd place, bronze medalist(s)	Jean-Marc Pontvianne	France	15.27	15.23	16.01	x	16.09	x	16.09
4	Tiago Pereira	Portugal	15.50	X	15.90	14.89	15.80	16.05	16.05
5	Jean-Noël Cretinoir	France	16.04	15.81	X	15.92	X	16.00	16.04
6	Vicente Docavo	Spain	X	15.48	X	15.79	15.25	X	15.79
7	Musa Tüzen	Turkey	15.46	1.36	X	15.74	15.77	X	15.77
8	Tom Yakubov	Israel	X	15.60	X	X	15.23	15.49	15.60
9	Riccardo Appoloni	Italy	15.28	x	15.40				15.40
-	Antonino Trio	Italy							DNS

=== Shot put ===
Rank	Athlete	Nationality	#1	#2	#3	#4	#5	#6	Result
1st place, gold medalist(s)	Alejandro Noguera	Spain	17.75	17.92	X	18.58	18.03	X	18.58
2nd place, silver medalist(s)	Daniele Secci	Italy	16.92	18.16	X	X	18.14	18.48	18.48
3rd place, bronze medalist(s)	Frédéric Dagée	France	17.43	17.97	17.51	18.09	17.86	18.22	18.22
4	Tomaš Djurovic	Montenegro	17.12	17.82	17.76	X	X	X	17.82
5	Tsanko Arnaudov	Portugal	16.53	17.12	17.81	17.76	X	17.70	17.81
6	Osman Can Özdeveci	Turkey	X	X	16.23	17.18	16.63	X	17.18
7	Boris Vain	France	X	X	16.06	X	X	X	16.06

=== Discus throw ===
Rank	Athlete	Nationality	#1	#2	#3	#4	#5	#6	Result
1st place, gold medalist(s)	Danijel Furtula	Montenegro	X	58.32	62.03	X	X	X	62.03
2nd place, silver medalist(s)	Stefano Petrei	Italy	51.86	X	51.08	52.00	52.46	51.44	52.46
3rd place, bronze medalist(s)	Dean-Nick Allen	France	50.49	X	X	48.69	50.78	46.35	50.78
4	Tuna Ceylan	Turkey	46.45	X	45.41	X	X	48.73	48.73

=== Hammer throw ===
Rank	Athlete	Nationality	#1	#2	#3	#4	#5	#6	Result
1st place, gold medalist(s)	Özkan Baltacı	Turkey	59.44	67.45	68.88	67.47	X	64.86	68.88
2nd place, silver medalist(s)	Pedro José Martín	Spain	66.28	65.01	X	X	X	61.94	66.28
3rd place, bronze medalist(s)	Marco Bortolato	Italy	66.09	62.92	65.35	X	64.58	X	66.09
4	Antoine Nabialek	France	58.47	58.00	61.54	59.54	59.18	X	61.54

=== Javelin throw ===
Rank	Athlete	Nationality	#1	#2	#3	#4	#5	#6	Result
1st place, gold medalist(s)	Killian Duréchou	France	63.84	68.02	X	X	69.17	71.55	71.55
2nd place, silver medalist(s)	Ante-Roko Zemunik	Croatia	X	X	61.03	X	63.15	69.79	69.79
3rd place, bronze medalist(s)	Joseph Figliolini	Italy	61.00	63.86	68.09	66.03	35.07	66.50	68.09
4	Tiago Arpata	Portugal	65.35	64.75	65.71	67.16	66.19	66.74	67.16
5	David Dušan Kastrevc	Slovenia	64.32	63.42	X	53.68	66.65	-	66.65
6	Alan Ferber	Israel	66.03	62.33	66.06	62.01	59.76	61.75	66.06
7	Muhammed Mavis	Turkey	63.76	X	X	62.07	X	64.05	64.05
-	Mauro Fraresso	Italy							DNS

== Women's results ==
=== 100 meters ===
Rank	Name	Nationality	Time
1st place, gold medalist(s)	Stella Akakpo	France	11.42
2nd place, silver medalist(s)	Irene Siragusa	Italy	11.57
3rd place, bronze medalist(s)	Nimet Karakuş	Turkey	11.91
4	Olivia Mazeau	France	12.00
5	Gizem Demirel	Turkey	12.45
6	Valbona Selimi	Macedonia	12.73
7	Annalise Vassallo	Malta	12.82

=== 200 meters ===
Rank	Name	Nationality	Time
1st place, gold medalist(s)	Jennifer Galais	France	23.06
2nd place, silver medalist(s)	Irene Siragusa	Italy	23.79
3rd place, bronze medalist(s)	Brigitte Ntiamoah	France	23.92
4	Elena Moreno	Spain	24.15
5	Filipa Martins	Portugal	24.63
6	Nimet Karakuş	Turkey	24.68
7	Gizem Demirel	Turkey	25.99

=== 400 meters ===
Rank	Name	Nationality	Time
1st place, gold medalist(s)	Agnès Raharolahy	France	53.07
2nd place, silver medalist(s)	Cátia Azevedo	Portugal	53.14
3rd place, bronze medalist(s)	Louise-Anne Bertheau	France	55.03
4	Derya Yildirim	Turkey	58.00
5	Dorotea Rebernik	Slovenia	1:00.76

=== 800 metres ===
Rank	Name	Nationality	Time
1st place, gold medalist(s)	Marta Pen	Portugal	2:07.14
2nd place, silver medalist(s)	Lisa Blamèble	France	2:08.28
3rd place, bronze medalist(s)	Rene Balderassi	Italy	2:08.40
4	Hatice Ünzir	Turkey	2:17.35
-	Victoria Sauleda	Spain	DNS

=== 1500 metres ===
Rank	Name	Nationality	Time
1st place, gold medalist(s)	Federica Del Buono	Italy	4:14.20
2nd place, silver medalist(s)	Gamze Bulut	Turkey	4:15.03
3rd place, bronze medalist(s)	Blanca Fernández	Spain	4:17.89
4	Marta Pen	Portugal	4:18.61
5	Cristina Espejo	Spain	4:30.18

=== 10.000 metres ===
Rank	Name	Nationality	Time
1st place, gold medalist(s)	Esma Aydemir	Turkey	34:33.86
2nd place, silver medalist(s)	Ana Vega	Spain	34:40.58
3rd place, bronze medalist(s)	Sevilay Eytemis	Turkey	34:42.78
4	Marta Martins	Portugal	34:55.00
5	Virginia Maria Abate	Italy	35:04.10
6	Beatriz Álvarez	Spain	35:22.66
7	Catia Santos	Portugal	35:25.37
8	Giulia Mattioli	Italy	35:42.49
9	Meritxell Soler	Spain	37:12.08
10	Sonia Ruffini	Italy	37:33.83
-	Suzana Godinho	Portugal	DNF

=== 100 metres hurdles ===
Rank	Name	Nationality	Time
1st place, gold medalist(s)	Mathilde Raibaut	France	13.23
2nd place, silver medalist(s)	Edith Doekoe	France	13.52
3rd place, bronze medalist(s)	Silvia Zuin	Italy	13.78
4	Teresa Errandonea	Spain	13.84
5	Ilkay Avci	Turkey	14.27
6	Krystel Saneh	Lebanon	15.32
-	Eva Vital	Portugal	DNF

=== 400 metres hurdles ===
Rank	Name	Nationality	Time
1st place, gold medalist(s)	Aurélie Chaboudez	France	56.67
2nd place, silver medalist(s)	Ayomide Folorunso	Italy	58.50
3rd place, bronze medalist(s)	Fanny Lefevre	France	58.58
4	Emel Şanlı	Turkey	58.97
5	Raphaela Lukudo	Italy	59.52
6	Meryem Kasap	Turkey	59.87
7	Andreia Crespo	Portugal	1:00.31
8	Karla Ljubi	Slovenia	1:06.28
-	Alba Casanovas	Spain	DNS

=== 3000 metres steeplechase ===
Rank	Name	Nationality	Time
1st place, gold medalist(s)	Maeva Danois	France	10:01.18
2nd place, silver medalist(s)	María José Pérez	Spain	10:06.78
3rd place, bronze medalist(s)	Sebahat Akpınar	Turkey	10:07.63
4	Catarina Carvalho	Portugal	10:17.83
5	Seyran Adanır	Turkey	10:20.33
6	Irene Sánchez-Escribano	Spain	10:30.33
7	Joana Soares	Portugal	10:34.22
8	Matea Parlov	Croatia	10:39.78
9	Valentine Huzé	France	11:05.80
10	Klara Ljubi	Slovenia	11:08.28

=== 10.000 metres race walk ===
Rank	Name	Nationality	Time
1st place, gold medalist(s)	Federica Curiazzi	Italy	10:01.18
2nd place, silver medalist(s)	Emilie Tissot	France	10:06.78
3rd place, bronze medalist(s)	Amanda Cano	Spain	10:07.63
4	Mar Juárez	Spain	10:17.83
5	Filipa Ferrera	Portugal	10:20.33
6	María Larios	Spain	10:30.33
7	Nadia Cancela	Portugal	10:34.22
8	Maria Vittoria Becchetti	Italy	10:39.78
9	Ines Pastorino	France	11:05.80
10	Victoria Olivera	Portugal	11:08.28
-	Chahinez Nasri	Tunisia	DNF
-	Ana Clemente	Italy	DNF
-	Derya Karakurt	Turkey	DNF

=== 4x100 m relay ===
Rank	Nation	Team	Time
1st place, gold medalist(s)	France	Ornella Ezoua / Brigitte Ntiamoah / Jennifer Galais / Stella Akakpo	45.29
2nd place, silver medalist(s)	Turkey	Erzoi Sayir / Gizem Demirel / Rubia Gigek / Nimet Karakuş	49.28

=== 4x400 m relay ===
Rank	Nation	Team	Time
1st place, gold medalist(s)	France	Fanny Lefevre / Agnès Raharolahy / Louise-Anne Bertheau / Aurélie Chaboudez	3:38.22
2nd place, silver medalist(s)	Portugal	Murcia Cardoso / Filipa Martins / Andreia Crespo / Cátia Azevedo	3:39.69
3rd place, bronze medalist(s)	Turkey	Derya Yildirim / Hatice Ünzir / Meryem Kasap / Emel Şanlı	3:50.50

=== High jump ===
Rank	Athlete	Nationality	1.65	1.70	1.74	1.77	1.80	1.83	Result
1st place, gold medalist(s)	Desirée Rossit	Italy	-	o	o	o	o	xxx	1.80
2nd place, silver medalist(s)	Cristina Ferrando	Spain	o	o	xxo	o	xo	xxx	1.80
3rd place, bronze medalist(s)	Claudia García	Spain	o	o	o	o	xxo	xxx	1.80
4	Marine Vallet	France	-	o	o	o	xxx		1.77
5	Solène Gicquel	France	o	xxo	o	xo	xxx		1.77
6	Aikaterini Kyriakopoulou	Greece	-	o	o	xxx			1.74
7	Esmanur Alkaç	Turkey	o	o	xxx				1.70

=== Pole vault ===
Rank	Athlete	Nationality	3.66	3.86	4.06	4.26	Result
1st place, gold medalist(s)	Sonia Malavisi	Italy	-	-	o	xxx	4.06
2nd place, silver medalist(s)	Roberta Bruni	Italy	-	-	xo	xxx	4.06
3rd place, bronze medalist(s)	Solene Guiloineau	France	o	xo	xxx		3.86
4	Demet Parlak	Turkey	xo	xo	xxx		3.86
5	Ninon Guillon-Romarin	France	-	xxo	xxx		3.86
6	Raquel Cosme	Spain	xo	xxx			3.66
-	Maialen Axpe	Spain	xxx				NM
-	Dorra Mafhoudhi	Tunisia					DNS

=== Long jump ===
Rank	Athlete	Nationality	#1	#2	#3	#4	#5	#6	Result
1st place, gold medalist(s)	Teresa Carvalho	Portugal	6.52	X	X	6.03	X	5.94	6.52
2nd place, silver medalist(s)	Awa Sene	France	5.91	6.10	5.94	5.92	5.87	5.66	6.10
3rd place, bronze medalist(s)	Dariya Derkach	Italy	X	5.86	6.08	5.90	6.04	6.09	6.09
4	Anna Visibelli	Italy	X	5.92	6.04	X	5.75	5.72	6.04
5	Amandine Raffin	France	6.01	5.96	X	X	5.66	X	6.01
6	Nesibe Atacan	Turkey	5.40	5.72	5.76	5.79	5.63	5.63	5.79
7	Tubor Aydin	Turkey	5.65	X	5.33	5.42	5.30	X	5.65
8	Krystel Saneh	Lebanon	5.29	5.14	5.24	5.04	5.07	4.95	5.29
-	Ana Martín-Sacristán	Spain	x	x	x				NM

=== Triple jump ===
Rank	Athlete	Nationality	#1	#2	#3	#4	#5	#6	Result
1st place, gold medalist(s)	Jeanine Assani Issouf	France	13.61	13.95	13.57	13.45	X	X	13.95
2nd place, silver medalist(s)	Dariya Derkach	Italy	13.14	13.81	13.74	12.90	11.04	13.48	13.81
3rd place, bronze medalist(s)	Ottavia Cestonaro	Italy	X	13.06	13.27	13.52	13.41	13.64	13.64
4	Rouguy Diallo	France	13.53	13.48	13.31	13.59	X	X	13.59
5	Andrea Calleja	Spain	12.56	13.35	X	13.04	11.93	13.26	13.35
6	Ariadna Ramos	Spain	12.94	X	13.10	13.06	X	13.11	13.11
7	Tuğba Aydın	Turkey	12.79	X	12.71	12.32	12.58	12.75	12.79

=== Shot put ===
Rank	Athlete	Nationality	#1	#2	#3	#4	#5	#6	Result
1st place, gold medalist(s)	Emel Dereli	Turkey	17.19	X	16.99	X	X	X	17.19
2nd place, silver medalist(s)	María Belén Toimil	Spain	14.56	15.16	14.83	14.50	15.31	14.93	15.31
3rd place, bronze medalist(s)	Monia Cantarella	Italy	14.41	14.25	14.53	14.86	X	14.76	14.76
4	Rose Sharon Pierre-Louis	France	13.77	14.51	14.69	X	14.21	X	14.69
5	Caroline Metayer	France	14.35	14.48	X	X	14.34	14.43	14.48
6	Francesca Stevanato	Italy							DNS

=== Discus throw ===
Rank	Athlete	Nationality	#1	#2	#3	#4	#5	#6	Result
1st place, gold medalist(s)	Natalina Capoferri	Italy	49.81	51.88	53.15	47.76	X	49.60	53.15
2nd place, silver medalist(s)	Elçin Kaya	Turkey	47.36	46.50	52.25	X	X	X	52.25
3rd place, bronze medalist(s)	Elisa Boaro	Italy	44.69	49.23	48.58	51.33	X	48.22	51.33
4	Caroline Metayer	France	47.18	46.83	X	47.32	47.76	47.64	47.76
5	Charline Duval	France	43.00	45.74	46.03	46.16	X	46.48	46.48

=== Hammer throw ===
Rank	Athlete	Nationality	#1	#2	#3	#4	#5	#6	Result
1st place, gold medalist(s)	Alexandra Tavernier	France	66.37	66.30	X	X	X	X	66.37
2nd place, silver medalist(s)	Aline Salut	France	56.06	61.67	63.36	60.15	X	X	63.36
3rd place, bronze medalist(s)	Francesca Massobrio	Italy	X	57.68	X	57.06	57.78	55.72	57.78
4	Petra Jakeljic	Croatia	54.26	54.94	54.65	57.26	56.16	56.32	57.26
5	María Acebedo	Spain	X	56.75	56.47	57.08	56.98	56.28	57.08
5	Elif Kocaz	Turkey	41.22	X	X	X	46.62	X	46.62

=== Javelin throw ===
Rank	Athlete	Nationality	#1	#2	#3	#4	#5	#6	Result
1st place, gold medalist(s)	Alexie Alaïs	France	56.30	55.61	55.70	51.83	48.85	52.30	56.30
2nd place, silver medalist(s)	Prescilla Lecurieux	France	X	53.33	55.48	49.65	X	49.89	55.48
3rd place, bronze medalist(s)	Sara Jemai	Italy	51.57	X	49.75	X	50.49	-	51.57
4	Berivan Şakır	Turkey	44.21	X	46.36	47.28	51.32	49.91	51.32
5	Lidia Parada	Spain	49.11	X	X	X	X	X	49.11
