= 2014 Mediterranean Athletics U23 Championships =

I Mediterranean Athletics U23 Championships
- Dates: 14–15 June 2014
- Host city: Aubagne, France
- Venue: Estadio Municipal Bahía Sur
- Events: 42
- Participation: 25 nations

The 2014 Mediterranean Athletics U23 Championships was an athletics competition which was held in Aubagne, France, from 14 to 15 June 2014. A total of 42 events were contested, of which 21 by male and 21 by female athletes. A total of 25 nations participated in the championships.

== Medal summary ==
=== Men ===
| Event | Gold | | Silver | | Bronze | |
|---|---|---|---|---|---|---|
| 100 metres | Ken Romain (FRA) | 10,29 | Lorenzo Bilotti (ITA) | 10.33 | Adria Burriel (ESP) | 10.34 |
| 200 metres | Jeffrey John (FRA) | 20.63 | Eseosa Desalu (ITA) | 20.78 | Pierre Vincent (FRA) | 20.87 |
| 400 metres | Thomas Jordier (FRA) | 46.39 | Davide Re (ITA) | 46.42 | Mateo Ruzic (CRO) | 46,51 |
| 800 metres | Daniel Andújar (ESP) | 1:50,16 | Leo Morgana (FRA) | 1:50.23 | Hasan Basri Guduk (TUR) | 1:50.42 |
| 1500 metres | Marc Alcalá (ESP) | 3:51.74 | Mohad Abdikadar Sheikh Ali (ITA) | 3:51.95 | Antoine Martinet (FRA) | 3:52.29 |
| 5000 metres | Rui Pinto (POR) | 14:11.58 | Suat Kabulakra (TUR) | 14:32.65 | Sonmez Dag (TUR) | 14:43.72 |
| 10,000 metres | Seref Dirli (TUR) | 30:47.27 | Youssef Mekdagou (FRA) | 30:52.54 | Houssame Benabbou (ESP) | 30:54.06 |
| 110 metre hurdles | Simon Krauss (FRA) | 13.64 | Aurel Manga (FRA) | 13.76 | Javier Colomo (ESP) | 13.86 |
| 400 metre hurdles | Stephane Yato (FRA) | 51.12 | Riadh Sayeh (TUR) | 51.56 | Sergio Fernández (ESP) | 51.59 |
| 3000 metre steeplechase | Fernando Carro (ESP) | 9:02.11 | Jorge Blanco (ESP) | 9:02.70 | Giuseppe Gerratana (ITA) | 9:02.88 |
| 4 × 100 metre relay | Italy (ITA); Alberto Boretti; Eseosa Desalu; Giacomo Tortu; Lorenzo Bilotti | 39.99 | Turkey (TUR); Miklat Kaya; Yigitcan Hekimoglu; Fatim Aktas; Aykut Ay | 41.59 | not assigned | N/A |
| 4 × 400 metre relay | France (FRA); Jacques François; Leo Morgana; Bastien Mandrou; Pierre Chalus | 3:07,20 | Italy (ITA); Paolo Danesini; Matteo Lachini; Marco Lorenzi; Davide Re | 3:08,24 | Spain (ESP); Julio Arenas; Bertran Alcaraz; Lucas Bua; Daniel Andújar | 3:08,46 |
| 10,000 metres walk | Álvaro Martín (ESP) | 42:50 | Marc Tur (ESP) | 42:52 | Francesco Fortunato (ITA) | 42:54 |
| High jump | Vasilis Konstantinou (CYP) | 2.18 m | Paulo Conceicao (POR) | 2.15 m | Eugenio Rossi (SMR) | 2.15 m |
| Pole vault | Kévin Menaldo (FRA) | 5.750 m | Didac Salas (ESP) | 5.57 m | Ivan Horvat (CRO) | 5.42 m |
| Long jump | Alper Kulaksiz (TUR) | 7.83 (w) | Raihau Maiau (FRA) | 7.76 m | Anastasios Galazoulas (GRE) | 7.61 m |
| Triple jump | Pablo Torrijos (ESP) | 16,32 | Daniele Cavazzani (ITA) | 16.12 m | Jean-Marc Pontvianne (FRA) | 16.09 m |
| Shot put | Alejandro Noguera (ESP) | 18.58 m | Daniele Secci (ITA) | 18.48 m | Frederic Dagee (FRA) | 18.22 m |
| Discus throw | Danijel Furtula (MNE) | 62.03 m | Stefano Petrei (ITA) | 52.46 m | Dean-Nick Allen (FRA) | 50.78 m |
| Hammer throw | Ozkan Baltaci (TUR) | 68.88 m | Pedro Martín (ESP) | 66.28 m | Marco Bortolato (ITA) | 66.09 m |
| Javelin throw | Killian Durechou (FRA) | 71.55 m | Ante Roko Zemunik (CRO) | 69.79 m | Joseph Figliolini (ITA) | 68.09 m |

=== Women ===
| Event | Gold | | Silver | | Bronze | |
|---|---|---|---|---|---|---|
| 100 metres | Stella Akakpo (FRA) | 11.42 | Irene Siragusa (ITA) | 11.57 | Nimet Karakuş (TUR) | 11.91 |
| 200 metres | Jennifer Galais (FRA) | 23.06 | Irene Siragusa (ITA) | 23.79 | Brigitte Ntiamoah (FRA) | 23.92 |
| 400 metres | Agnès Raharolahy (FRA) | 53.07 | Cátia Azevedo (POR) | 53.14 | Louise-Anne Bertheau (FRA) | 55.03 |
| 800 metres | Marta Pen (POR) | 2:07.14 | Lisa Blamèble (FRA) | 2:08.28 | Irene Baldessari (ITA) | 2:08.40 |
| 1500 metres | Federica Del Buono (ITA) | 4:14.20 | Gamze Bulut (TUR) | 4:15.03 | Blanca Fernández (ESP) | 4:17.89 |
| 10,000 metres | Esma Aydemir (TUR) | 34:33:88 | Ana Vega (ESP) | 34:40:58 | Sevilay Eytemiş (TUR) | 34:42:78 |
| 100 metre hurdles | Mathilde Raibaut (FRA) | 13.23 | Edith Doekoe (FRA) | 13.52 | Silvia Zuin (ITA) | 13.78 |
| 400 metre hurdles | Aurélie Chaboudez (FRA) | 56.67 | Ayomide Folorunso (ITA) | 58.50 | Fanny Lefevre (FRA) | 58.58 |
| 3000 metre steeplechase | Maëva Danois (FRA) | 10:01:18 | María José Pérez (ESP) | 10:06:78 | Sebahat Akpınar (TUR) | 10:07:63 |
| 4 × 100 metre relay | France (FRA); Ornella Ezoua; Brigitte Ntiamoah; Jennifer Galais; Stella Akakpo | 45.29 | Turkey (TUR); Erzoi Sayir; Girem Demirez; Rubia Gigek; Nimet Karakus | 49.28 | not assigned | N/A |
| 4 × 400 metre relay | France (FRA); Fanny Lefevre; Agnès Raharolahy; Louise-Anne Bertheau; Aurélie Chaboudez | 3:38,22 | Portugal (POR); Murcia Cardoso; Filipa Martins; Andreia Crespo; Catia Azevedo | 3:39,69 | Turkey (TUR); Derya Yildirim; Hatice Unzir; Meryem Kasap; Emel Sanli | 3:50,50 |
| 10,000 metres walk | Federica Curiazzi (ITA) | 46:33.33 | Émilie Tissot (FRA) | 47:16.80 | Amanda Cano (ESP) | 48:19.41 |
| High jump | Desiree Rossit (ITA) | 1.80 m | Cristina Ferrando (ESP) | 1.80 m | Claudia García (ESP) | 1.80 m |
| Pole vault | Sonia Malavisi (ITA) | 4.06 m | Roberta Bruni (ITA) | 4.06 m | Solene Guiloineau (FRA) | 4.86 m |
| Long jump | Teresa Carvalho (POR) | 6.52 m | Awa Sene (FRA) | 6.10 m | Dariya Derkach (ITA) | 6.09 m |
| Triple jump | Jeanine Assani-Issouf (FRA) | 13.95 m | Dariya Derkach (ITA) | 13.81 m | Ottavia Cestonaro (ITA) | 13.64 m |
| Shot put | Emel Dereli (TUR) | 17.19 m | María Belén Toimil (ESP) | 15.31 m | Monia Cantarella (ITA) | 14.86 m |
| Discus throw | Natalina Capoferri (ITA) | 53.13 m | Elçin Kaya (TUR) | 52.25 m | Elisa Boaro (ITA) | 51.33 m |
| Hammer throw | Alexandra Tavernier (FRA) | 66.37 m | Aline Salut (FRA) | 63.36 m | Francesca Massobrio (ITA) | 57.78 m |
| Javelin throw | Alexie Alaïs (FRA) | 56.30 m | Prescilla Lecurieux (FRA) | 55.48 m | Sara Jemai (ITA) | 51.57 m |

== Medal table ==
* Host nation (France)

| Rank | Nation | Gold | Silver | Bronze | Total |
|---|---|---|---|---|---|
| 1 | France* | 19 | 10 | 9 | 38 |
| 2 | Italy | 6 | 13 | 12 | 31 |
| 3 | Spain | 6 | 8 | 8 | 22 |
| 4 | Turkey | 5 | 6 | 6 | 17 |
| 5 | Portugal | 3 | 3 | 0 | 6 |
| 6 | Cyprus | 1 | 0 | 0 | 1 |
| 6 | Montenegro | 1 | 0 | 0 | 1 |
| 8 | Croatia | 0 | 1 | 2 | 3 |
| 9 | Greece | 0 | 0 | 1 | 1 |
| 9 | San Marino | 0 | 0 | 1 | 1 |
| Totals (10 entries) | | 41 | 41 | 39 | 121 |

== Participating countries ==
- Algeria
- Albania
- Andorra
- Bosnia and Herzegovina
- Croatia
- Cyprus
- Egypt
- France
- Greece
- Israel
- Italy
- Lebanon
- North Macedonia
- Malta
- Morocco
- Monaco
- Montenegro
- Palestine
- Portugal
- San Marino
- Serbia
- Slovenia
- Spain
- Tunisia
- Turkey
