= Filipa Martins =

Filipa Martins may refer to:

- Ana Filipa Martins (born 1996), Portuguese artistic gymnast
- Filipa Martins (athlete) (born 1992), Portuguese sprinter
