= Yiğitcan Hekimoğlu =

Turkish Cypriot sprinter (born 1992)

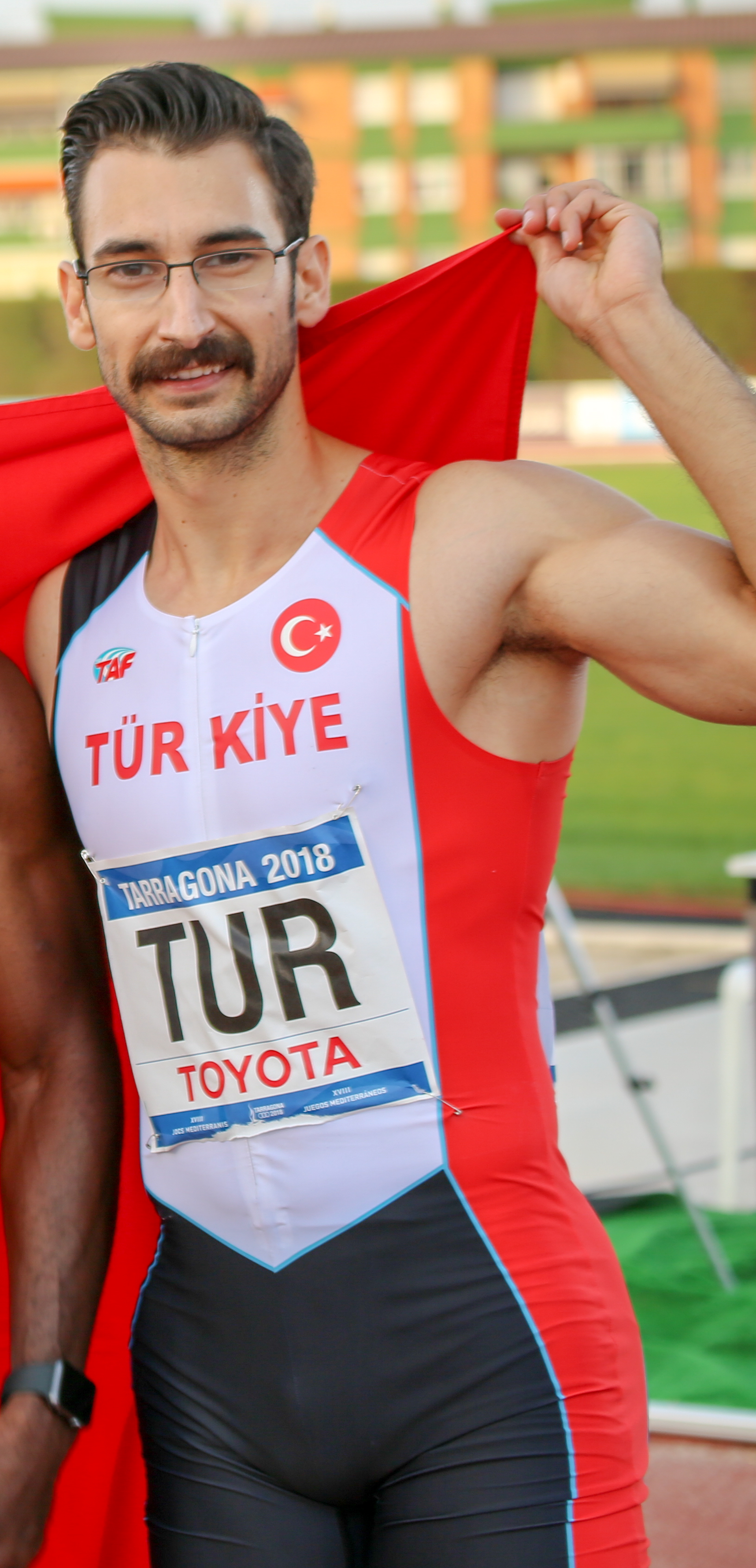
- Yiğitcan Hekimoğlu in 2018

Personal information
- Born: 27 April 1992 (age 34) Limassol, Cyprus
- Height: 1.83 m (6 ft 0 in)
- Weight: 76 kg (168 lb)

Sport
- Sport: Athletics
- Events: 100 m, 200 m

Yiğitcan Hekimoğlu (born 27 April 1992) is a Turkish Cypriot sprinter who represents Turkey internationally. He won a silver medal in the 4 × 100 metres relay at the 2018 European Championships. In addition, he represented his country in the same event at the 2017 World Championships finishing seventh in the final.

== International competitions ==
| Year | Competition | Venue | Position | Event | Notes |
Representing Turkey
| 2010 | World Junior Championships | Moncton, Canada | 38th (h) | 100 m | 10.82 |
| 2011 | European Junior Championships | Tallinn, Estonia | 8th | 100 m | 10.80 |
| 2011 | European Junior Championships | Tallinn, Estonia | 13th (h) | 200 m | 21.94 |
| 2011 | European Junior Championships | Tallinn, Estonia | 7th | 4 × 100 m relay | 41.57 |
| 2012 | European Championships | Helsinki, Finland | 14th (h) | 4 × 100 m relay | 41.42 |
| 2014 | Mediterranean U23 Championships | Aubagne, France | 7th | 200 m | 21.98 |
| 2014 | Mediterranean U23 Championships | Aubagne, France | 2nd | 4 × 100 m relay | 41.59 |
| 2017 | Islamic Solidarity Games | Baku, Azerbaijan | 2nd | 4 × 100 m relay | 39.56 |
| 2017 | World Championships | London, United Kingdom | 7th | 4 × 100 m relay | 38.73 |
| 2018 | Mediterranean Games | Tarragona, Spain | 11th (h) | 200 m | 21.15 |
| 2018 | Mediterranean Games | Tarragona, Spain | 2nd | 4 × 100 m relay | 38.50 |
| 2018 | European Championships | Berlin, Germany | 15th (h) | 100 m | 10.40 |
| 2018 | European Championships | Berlin, Germany | 2nd | 4 × 100 m relay | 37.98 |
| 2018 | Continental Cup | Ostrava, Czech Republic | 2nd | 4 × 100 m relay | 38.96^{1} |

^{1}Representing Europe

== Personal bests ==
Outdoor

- 100 metres – 10.34 (-0.9 m/s, Erzurum 2018)
- 200 metres – 21.15 (+1.1 m/s, Bursa 2018)

Indoor

- 60 metres – 6.82 (Istanbul 2013)
