= Ken Romain =

French sprinter

Personal information
- Born: 17 April 1993 (age 33)
- Height: 186 cm (6 ft 1 in)
- Weight: 77 kg (170 lb)

Sport
- Sport: Athletics
- Club: Trembley AC Athletisme

Achievements and titles
- Personal best(s): 100 m: 10.29; 200 m: 20.94
Medal record
Representing France
Men's athletics
IAAF World Relays
| Bronze medal – third place | 2014 Nassau | 4 × 200 m relay |

Ken Romain (born 17 April 1993) is a French track and field sprinter who competes in the 100 metres and 200 metres. He holds personal bests of 10.29 and 20.94 seconds for those events. He was the 100 m gold medallist at the 2014 Mediterranean Athletics U23 Championships. He has competed internationally with the French men's relay teams on several occasions. At the 2014 IAAF World Relays he won a bronze medal in the 4 × 200 metres relay, setting a European record time of 1:20.66 for the event.

Romain also represented his country at the 2017 IAAF World Relays and won age category gold medals in the 4 × 100 metres relay at the 2011 European Athletics Junior Championships and the European Athletics U23 Championships.

== International competitions ==
| Year | Competition | Venue | Position | Event | Notes |
|---|---|---|---|---|---|
| 2011 | European Junior Championships | Tallinn, Estonia | 10th (h) | 100 m | 10.75 |
| 2011 | European Junior Championships | Tallinn, Estonia | 1st | 4 × 100 m relay | 39.35 |
| 2012 | World Junior Championships | Barcelona, Spain | 24th (h) | 200 m | 21.34 |
| 2012 | World Junior Championships | Barcelona, Spain | — | 4 × 100 m relay | DQ |
| 2013 | European U23 Championships | Tampere, Finland | 6th | 4 × 100 m relay | 39.46 |
| 2014 | World Relays | Nassau, Bahamas | 3rd | 4 × 200 m relay | 1:20.66 AR |
| 2014 | Mediterranean U23 Championships | Aubagne, France | 1st | 100 m | 10.29 |
| 2014 | Mediterranean U23 Championships | Aubagne, France | — | 4 × 100 m relay | DQ |
| 2014 | European Team Championships | Braunschweig, Germany | — | 4 × 100 m relay | DQ |
| 2015 | European U23 Championships | Tallinn, Estonia | 1st | 4 × 100 m relay | 39.36 |
| 2017 | World Relays | Nassau, Bahamas | — | 4 × 200 m relay | DQ |
