= Blanca Fernández (runner) =

Spanish athletics competitor

Personal information
- Full name: Blanca Fernández de la Granja
- Born: 1 April 1992 (age 34) León, Spain
- Height: 1.71 m (5 ft 7 in)

Sport
- Sport: Athletics
- Event(s): Middle distance Cross Country
- Club: F.C. Barcelona
- Coached by: José Enrique Villacorta

Blanca Fernández de la Granja (born 1 April 1992 in León) is a Spanish runner competing primarily in middle-distance events. She has represented her country at several World and European cross country championships through different age group categories.

== International competitions ==
| Year | Competition | Venue | Position | Event | Notes |
Representing Spain
| 2009 | World Youth Championships | Brixen, Italy | 8th (s) | 800 m | 2:14.49 |
| 2009 | European Youth Olympic Festival | Tampere, Finland | 4th (h) | 800 m | 2:11.67 |
| 2009 | Gymnasiade | Doha, Qatar | 4th | 1000 m | 2:54.50 |
| 2013 | European U23 Championships | Tampere, Finland | 8th (h) | 1500 m | 4:20.71 |
| 2014 | Mediterranean U23 Championships | Aubagne, France | 3rd | 1500 m | 4:17.89 |
| 2017 | European Indoor Championships | Belgrade, Serbia | 15th (h) | 3000 m | 9:13.38 |
| 2017 | World Cross Country Championships | Kampala, Uganda | 8th | 4 x 2 km mixed relay | 24:29 |
| 2019 | World Cross Country Championships | Aarhus, Denmark | 59th | 10 km cross | 40:14 |
| 2021 | European Indoor Championships | Toruń, Poland | 19th (h) | 3000 m | 9:11.06 |
| 2022 | European Championships | Munich, Germany | 23rd (h) | 3000 m steeplechase | 10:00.26 |
| 2024 | European Championships | Rome, Italy | 30th (h) | 3000 m steeplechase | 10:08.59 |
