= Alper Kulaksız =

Turkish long jumper (born 1992)

Personal information
- Born: 6 April 1992 (age 34)
- Education: Cumhuriyet University; Anadolu University
- Height: 1.85 m (6 ft 1 in)
- Weight: 78 kg (172 lb)

Sport
- Sport: Athletics
- Event: Long jump

Alper Kulaksız (born 6 April 1992) is a Turkish athlete specialising in the long jump. He represented his country at the 2012 World Indoor Championships without qualifying for the final.

His personal bests in the long jump are 7.86 metres outdoors (+1.9 m/s, Istanbul 2016) and 7.94 metres indoors (Istanbul 2018).

== International competitions ==
Year	Competition	Venue	Position	Event	Notes
Representing Turkey
2009	World Youth Championships	Brixen, Italy	35th (q)	Long jump	6.69 m
2009	World Youth Championships	Brixen, Italy	20th (q)	Javelin (700 g)	63.27 m
2009	European Youth Olympic Festival	Tampere, Finland	22nd (q)	Long jump	6.53 m
2010	World Junior Championships	Moncton, Canada	33rd (q)	Long jump	6.89 m
2011	European Junior Championships	Tallinn, Estonia	8th	Long jump	7.49 m
2012	World Indoor Championships	Istanbul, Turkey	14th (q)	Long jump	7.42 m
2013	Mediterranean Games	Mersin, Turkey	6th	Long jump	7.61 m
2013	Universiade	Kazan, Russia	7th	Long jump	7.68 m
2013	Islamic Solidarity Games	Palembang, Indonesia	–	4 × 100 m relay	DQ
2013	Islamic Solidarity Games	Palembang, Indonesia	6th	Long jump	7.44 m
2014	Mediterranean U23 Championships	Aubagne, France	1st	Long jump	7.83 m (w)
2015	Universiade	Gwangju, South Korea	16th (q)	Long jump	7.32 m
2017	Islamic Solidarity Games	Baku, Azerbaijan	6th	Long jump	7.55 m
2017	Universiade	Taipei, Taiwan	23rd (q)	Long jump	7.37 m
2018	Mediterranean Games	Tarragona, Spain	5th	Long jump	7.79 m
2018	European Championships	Berlin, Germany	21st (q)	Long jump	7.58 m
