= Simon Krauss =

French hurdler

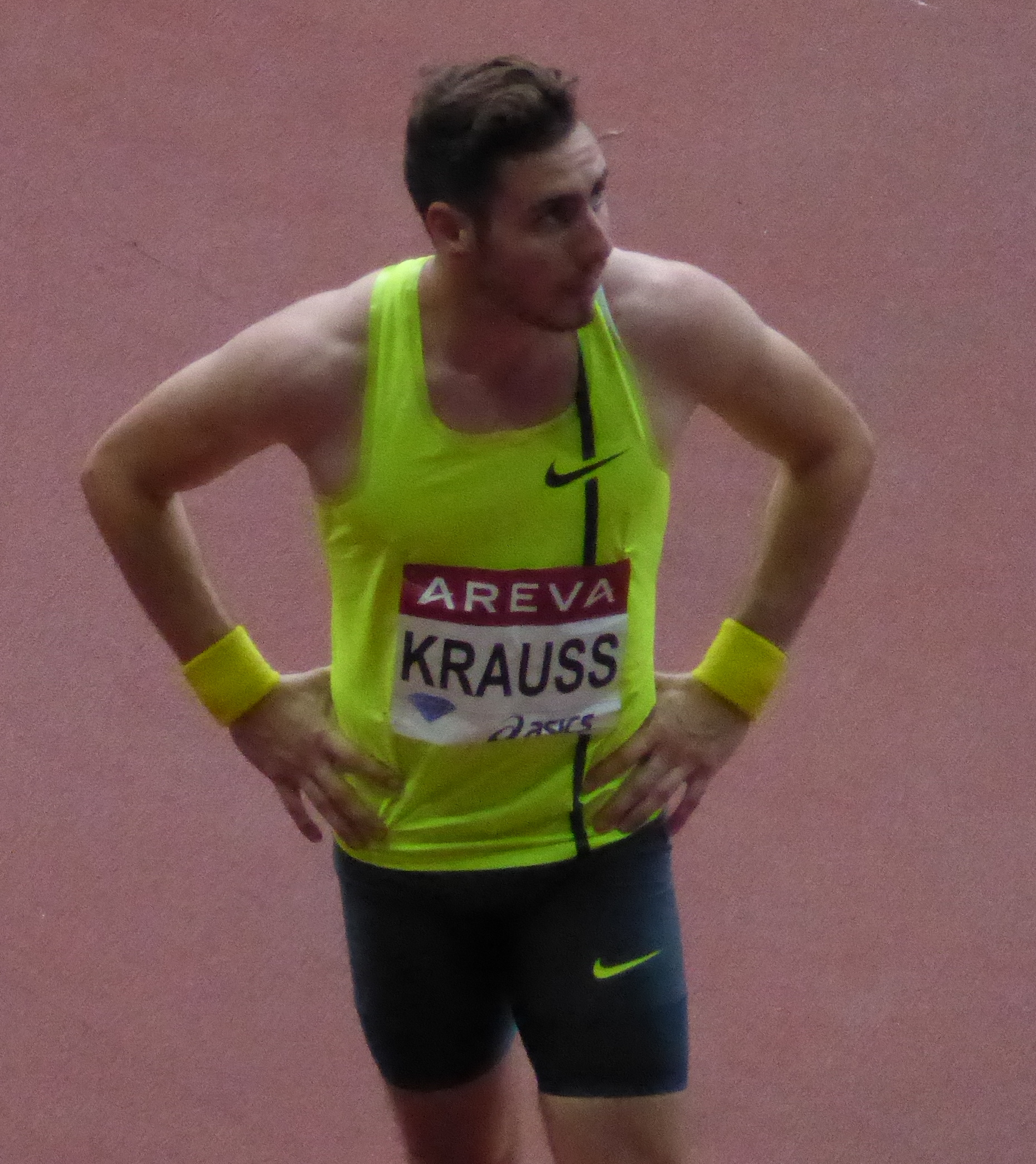
- Simon Krauss in 2015

Personal information
- Born: 12 February 1992 (age 34) Orléans, France
- Education: Paris 12 Val de Marne University
- Height: 1.82 m (6 ft 0 in)
- Weight: 77 kg (170 lb)

Sport
- Sport: Athletics
- Event: 110 m hurdles
- Club: Avia Club Athlétisme
- Coached by: Olivier Vallaeys

Simon Krauss (born 12 February 1992) is a French athlete specialising in the high hurdles. He won a gold medal at the 2013 European U23 Championships.

His personal bests are 13.51 seconds in the 110 metres hurdles (-0.3 m/s, Montreuil-sous-Bois 2014) and 7.63 seconds in the 60 metres hurdles (Reims 2018).

== International competitions ==
Year	Competition	Venue	Position	Event	Notes
Representing France
2013	European U23 Championships	Tampere, Finland	1st	110 m hurdles	13.55
2013	Jeux de la Francophonie	Nice, France	5th	110 m hurdles	14.18
2014	Mediterranean U23 Championships	Aubagne, France	1st	110 m hurdles	13.64
2017	Universiade	Taipei, Taiwan	5th (h)	110 m hurdles	13.91^{1}
2018	Mediterranean Games	Tarragona, Spain	4th	110 m hurdles	13.77

^{1}Disqualified in the semifinals
