= Julio Arenas =

Spanish sprinter (born 1993)

Personal information
- Born: 23 April 1993 (age 33)

Sport
- Country: Spain
- Sport: Athletics
- Event: 400 metres
- Club: Atletismo Numantino
Medal record
Men's athletics
Representing Spain
Mediterranean U23 Championships
| Bronze medal – third place | 2014 Aubagne | 4 × 400 m relay |

Julio Arenas Robles (born 23 April 1993) is a Spanish sprinter. He anchored his team to Olympic qualification at the 2024 World Athletics Relays and competed in the men's 4 × 400 metres relay at the 2024 Summer Olympics.

== Career ==
Arenas first competed at the 2011 European Athletics U20 Championships in both the 4 × 400 m and individual 400 m. He didn't advance from the first round in either event.

Arenas represented the Club Lynze de Parla as a junior before transferring to the Club Puerto de Alicante, coached by Gonzalo F. Rioja Cuesta. He placed first in the 400 m at the Spanish U20 Championships to qualify in that event and the 4 × 400 m at the 2012 World Junior Championships in Athletics. Though his team didn't advance in the relay, he placed 2nd in his first-round 400 m heat to advance to the semi-finals where he placed 8th. His time of 46.42 seconds made him the second-fastest Spanish under-20 athlete over the distance, and it would take him nine years to run under 47 seconds again.

Arenas placed 6th in the 400 m at the 2013 Spanish Athletics Championships. The following year, he qualified for the 2014 Mediterranean Athletics U23 Championships where he led off the Spanish 4 × 400 m team. His team won the bronze medal in 3:08.46 behind France and Italy. Later that month, he finished 2nd in his heat and 8th overall at the European Team Championships Super League 4 × 400 m. He ended the season 5th at the Spanish U23 Championships and 7th at the 2014 Spanish Athletics Championships.

He was 4th at both the 2016 Spanish indoor and outdoor athletics championships in the 400 m. After placing 5th at the 2017 Spanish Athletics Championships, he failed to make the finals at both the 2018 outdoor and 2019 indoor national championships but placed runner-up at the 2019 Spanish Athletics Championships, qualifying him for the 2019 World Athletics Championships men's 4 × 400 m. At the World Championships, Arenas ran 3rd leg for the team to place 6th in their heat.

Arenas was 4th in the 400 m at the 2020 Spanish Athletics Championships held in September and 5th the following year. He qualified for the 2021 World Athletics Relays mixed 4 × 400 m, where he placed 2nd in his heat to qualify Spain for the 2021 Olympics though he was substituted out in the finals, where Spain placed 6th. After not recording results in 2022, he was 6th at the 2023 Spanish Athletics Championships.

He did not compete at the 2024 Spanish Championships but was selected to represent Spain at the 2024 World Athletics Relays in both the men's and mixed 4 × 400 m relays. Running third leg, he placed 5th in the mixed first round and 3rd in the repechage round. In the men's race, he only ran in the repechage round, anchoring the team to win their heat and secure qualification to the 2024 Summer Olympics.

Arenas was seeded in the 2nd 4 × 400 m semi-final at the 2024 Olympics. He anchored the Spanish team to a 6th-place finish in 3:01.60 and did not advance to the finals.

In 2025, Arenas competed at the World Athletics Relays in the men's 4 × 400 m. He was 3rd in his first-round heat and 4th anchoring his team in their repechage heat, failing to qualify for the 2025 World Athletics Championships by one place. In the 2025 European Athletics Team Championships First Division, Arenas was 4th in the 'A' heat mixed 4 × 400 m which was also 4th overall.

== Personal life ==
Arenas is from Parla in the Community of Madrid. He trained in Fuenlabrada beginning in 2017.
