= Daniel Andújar =

Spanish middle-distance runner

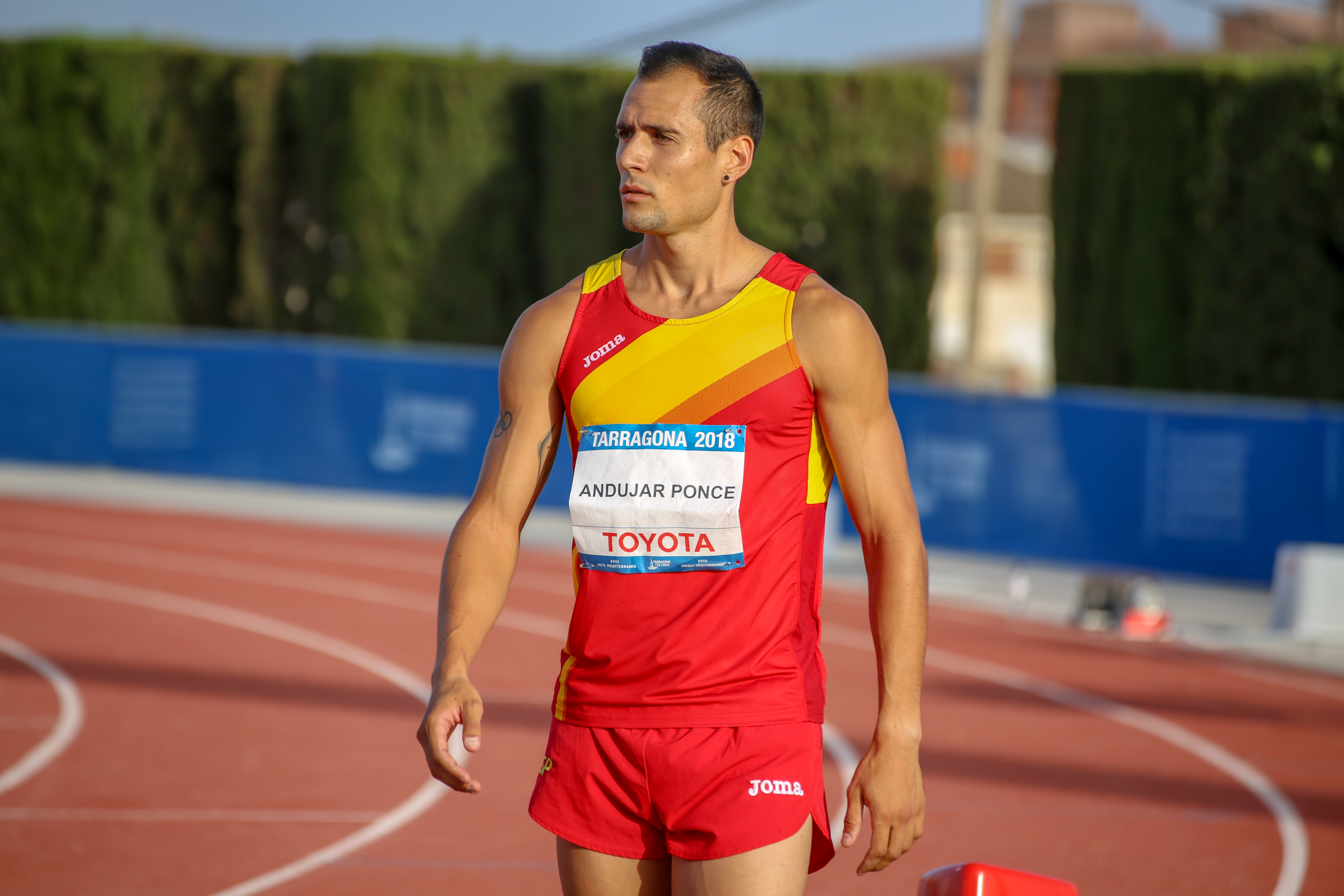
- Daniel Andújar in 2018

Personal information
- Born: 14 May 1994 (age 32) San Vicente del Raspeig, Spain
- Height: 1.83 m (6 ft 0 in)
- Weight: 78 kg (172 lb)

Sport
- Sport: Track and field
- Event: 800 metres
- Club: Playas de Castellón
- Coached by: Llorenç Solbes

Daniel Andújar Ponce (born 14 May 1994) is a Spanish middle-distance runner specialising in 800 metres. He represented his country at the 2014 and 2016 World Indoor Championships.

== Competition record ==
Year	Competition	Venue	Position	Event	Notes
Representing Spain
2011	World Youth Championships	Lille, France	36th (h)	800 m	1:54.83
2012	World Junior Championships	Barcelona, Spain	21st (h)	800 m	1:50.30
2013	European Junior Championships	Rieti, Italy	4th	800 m	1:50.14
2014	World Indoor Championships	Sopot, Poland	9th (h)	4 × 400 m relay	3:10.17
2014	Mediterranean U23 Championship	Aubagne, France	1st	800 m	1:50.16
2014	Mediterranean U23 Championship	Aubagne, France	3rd	4 × 400 m relay	3:08.46
2015	European U23 Championships	Tallinn, Estonia	7th	800 m	1:49.14
2016	World Indoor Championships	Portland, United States	8th (h)	800 m	1:49.49
2016	European Championships	Amsterdam, Netherlands	11th (sf)	800 m	1:47.64
2016	Olympic Games	Rio de Janeiro, Brazil	36th (h)	800 m	1:48.50
2017	European Indoor Championships	Belgrade, Serbia	4th	800 m	1:50.28
2017	World Championships	London, United Kingdom	—	800 m	DQ
2018	Mediterranean Games	Tarragona, Spain	5th	800 m	1:48.72
2018	European Championships	Berlin, Germany	16th (sf)	800 m	1:48.10

== Personal bests ==
Outdoor

- 400 metres – 46.87 (Toledo 2016)
- 800 metres – 1:45.17 (Madrid 2017)

Indoor

- 400 metres – 47.91 (Antequera 2014)
- 800 metres – 1:47.16 (Sabadell 2017)
