= Lorenzo Bilotti =

Italian bobsledder (born 1994)

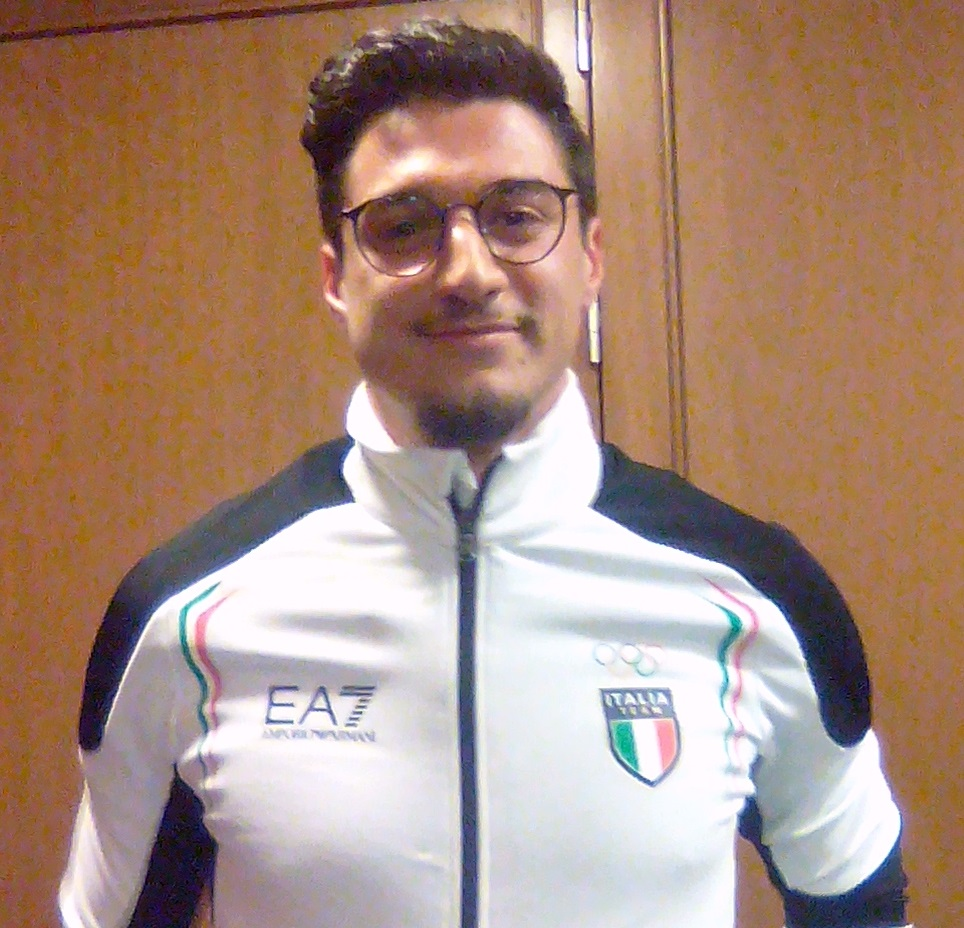
- Lorenzo Bilotti in 2018

Personal information
- Nationality: Italian
- Born: 21 September 1994 (age 31) Faenza, Italy
- Height: 1.81 m (5 ft 11 in)
- Weight: 81 kg (179 lb)

Sport
- Sport: Bobsleigh

Lorenzo Bilotti (born 21 September 1994) is an Italian bobsledder. He competed at the 2018 and 2022 Winter Olympics.

== Career ==
In 2011, at age 17, he was able to jump 6.99 m in the long jump. That year, Bilotti wore the blue jersey for the first time at the World Student Championships in Lille, France. He ends the year by winning his first national title: he is a gold medalist in the 100 meters at the Italian student championships (Rieti, Oct. 2).
