= Lisa Blamèble =

French middle-distance runner

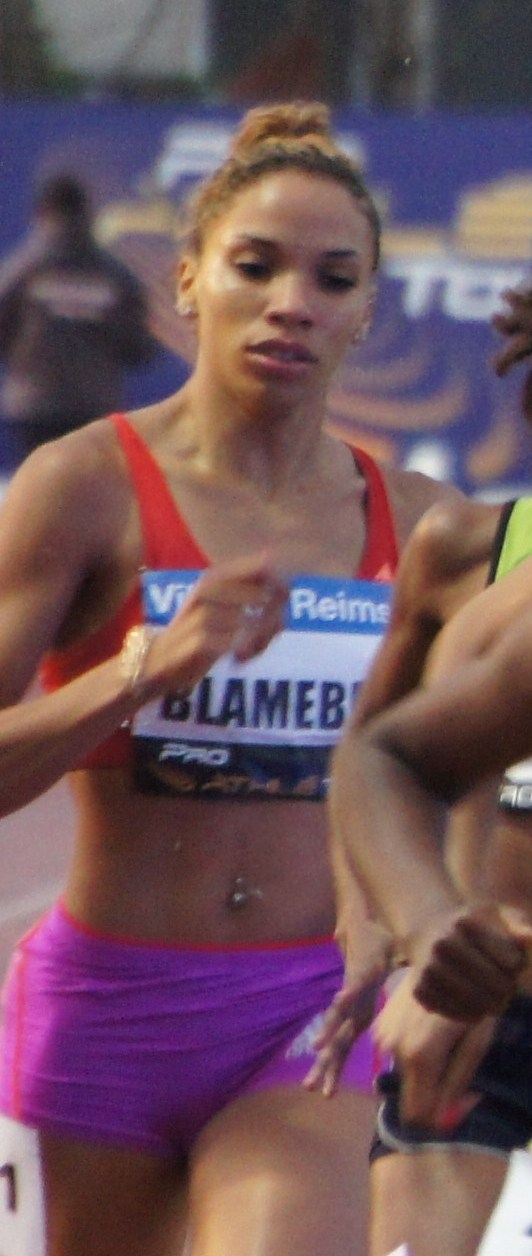
- Lisa Blamèble in 2013

Personal information
- Nationality: French
- Born: 15 September 1992 (age 33) Paris
- Years active: 2010s
- Height: 1.68 m (5 ft 6 in)

Sport
- Event: 800 metres
- Club: CA Montreuil 93
- Coached by: Bruno Gajer

Lisa Blamèble (born 15 September 1992, in Paris) is a French athlete, who specializes in the 800 meters.

== Biography ==
A junior champion of France in 2009 and in 2010, she placed fourth in the 2011 Junior European Championships. In 2012 and 2013, she won the Under -23 national title, and won also that year's French Elite National Indoor Championships for the 800m in the time 2:04.87.

In May 2014, at the IAAF World Relay Championships, at Nassau, Lisa Blamèble set a new French record in the 4 × 800 m relay in 8:17.54 together with Justine Fedronic, Clarisse Moh and Renelle Lamote.

She won the 2015 French Championships at Villeneuve d'Ascq in a time 2:05.00.

=== Prize list ===
- French Championships in Athletics :
  - winner of the 800m 2015
- French Indoor Athletics Championships:
  - winner of the 800m 2013

=== Records ===
Personal Bests
Event	Performance	Location	Date
800 m	2:03.49	Sotteville-lès-Rouen	6 July 2015
