= Jennifer Galais =

French sprinter (born 1992)

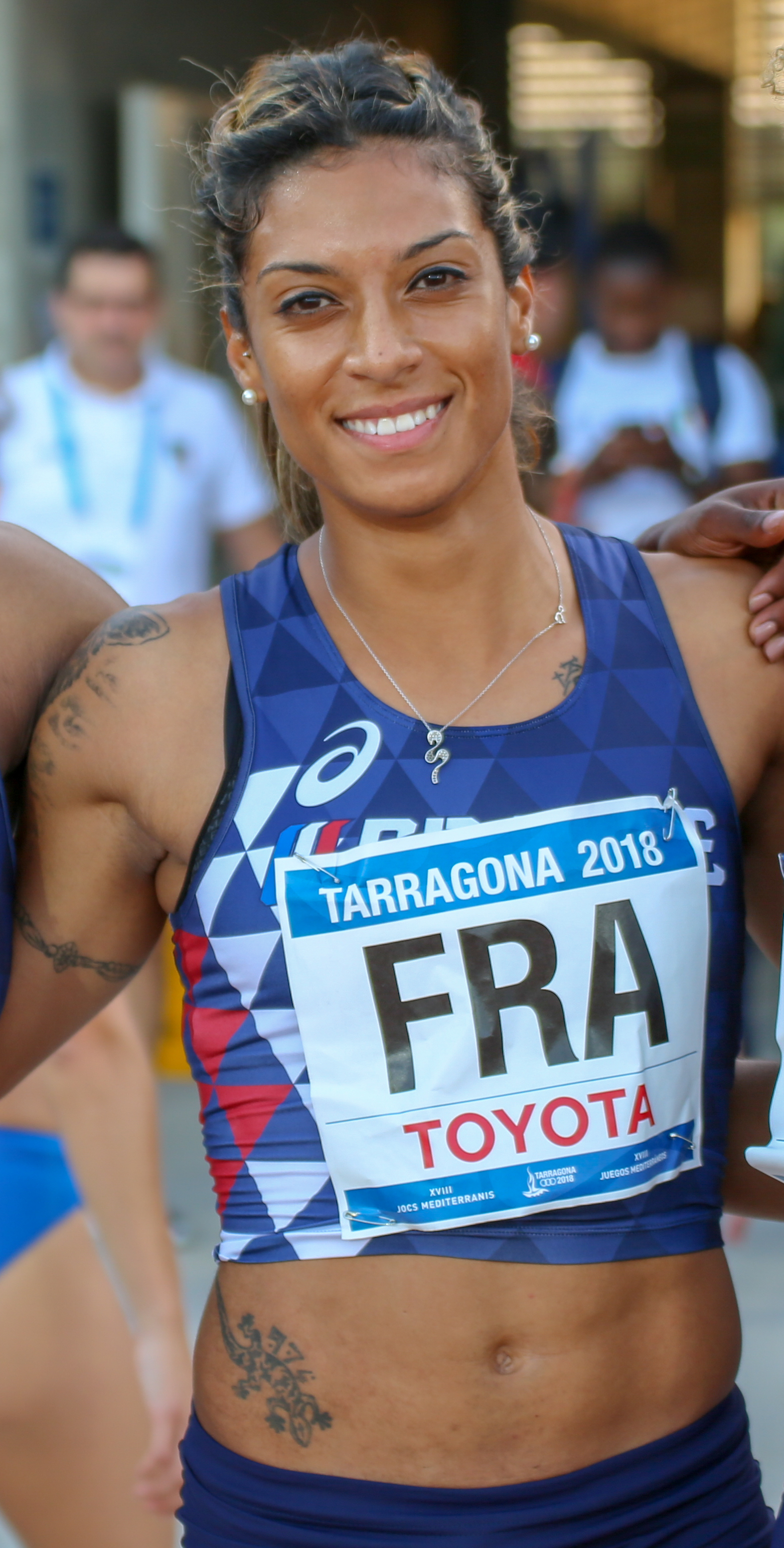
- Galais in 2018

Personal information
- Born: 7 March 1992 (age 34) Lyon, France
- Height: 170 cm (5 ft 7 in)
- Weight: 60 kg (132 lb)

Sport
- Country: France
- Sport: Athletics
- Events: 4 × 100m relay, 100 m, 200 m

Achievements and titles
- Regional finals: 2011 European Athletics Junior Championships
Medal record
Representing France
European Athletics Championships
Bronze medal – third place	2011 Tallinn	200 m

Jennifer Galais (born 7 March 1992 in Lyon) is a French athlete, specialising in the sprints.

== Career ==
She won the bronze medal 200 meters during the 2011 European Junior Championships, at Tallinn in Estonia, behind British Jodie Williams and Dutch Jamile Samuel.

On 10 July 2016, she was part of the team that placed 6th in the finals of the 4 × 100 m relay at the 2016 European Athletics Championships, in 43.05 seconds.

Galais competed for France at the 2016 Summer Olympics in the 4 × 100 m relay event.

=== Prize list ===
Palmarès international
Date	Competition	Location	Result	Event	Time
2011	Junior European Championships	Tallinn	3rd	200 m	23 s 55
2014	European Team Championships	Brunswick	2nd	4 × 100 m	43 s 19
2015	European Team Championships	Cheboksary	10th	100 m	12 s 12
2015	European Team Championships	Cheboksary	6th	4 × 100 m	43 s 84
2016	European Championships	Amsterdam	6th	4 × 100 m	43 s 05
2017	World Relays	Nassau	6th	4 × 200 m	1 min 35 s 11

=== Records ===
Personal records
Event	Performance	Location	Date
100 m	11 s 40	Forbach	24 May 2014
200 m	23 s 06	Aubagne	15 June 2014
