= Paulo Conceição =

Portuguese high jumper (born 1993)

Personal information
- Full name: Paulo Jorge da Silva Conceição
- Nationality: Portuguese
- Born: 29 December 1993 (age 32) Coimbra, Portugal
- Height: 1.87 m (6 ft 2 in)
- Weight: 74 Kg

Sport
- Country: Portugal
- Sport: High jump
- Club: S.L. Benfica
- Now coaching: Ana Oliveira

Achievements and titles
- Personal best(s): 2.20 m 2.24 m (indoors)
Medal record
Men's Athletics
Mediterranean U23 Championships
Silver medal – second place	2014 Aubagne	High jump

Paulo Jorge da Silva Conceição (born 29 December 1993) is a Portuguese high jumper who has competed for S.L. Benfica since 2011.

Paulo Conceição jumped 2.28m in 2020, setting a new Portuguese record. The previous record was 2.24m, also by Paulo Conceição, back in 2016. With 2.20 metres (7 feet 3 inches), Paulo Conceição holds the Portuguese U-23 record in men's high jump. His 2014 record 2.20m – set in Lisbon on 16 July 2014 – is the third best in national history, and only Rafael Gonçalves has achieved a higher jump, which he did on three occasions. He is also an indoor Portuguese U-23 record holder with a mark of 2.16 m (2014).

Paulo Conceição has a silver medal from the Mediterranean U23 Championships, in the city of Aubagne (France, near Marseille).

At young age he practiced all of the sports at school: gymnastics, volleyball, badminton, handball, and basketball and he did best in basketball. He won a Complete Athlete youth tournament, and in school he did well in the high jump and was already thinking about going into athletics professionally when he found professor Paulo Barrigana.

He joined Paulo Barrigana's group and had a great progression in this discipline. In 2011 he jumped over 2m and only three years later Paulo Conceição already represented Portugal at the Mediterranean U23 Championships, in Aubagne, where he became a silver medallist with 2.15m.

Paulo Conceição also represented Portugal at the European Athletics U23 Championships Tampere 2013 (Finland) at the Ibero American Championships São Paulo 2014 (Brazil), at the European Championships Under 23 Dublin 2014 (Ireland) and at the European Athletics Team Championships Tallinn 2014 (Estonia).

Yearly Progression: High Jump (outdoors/indoors): 2009: 1.91/-i; 2010: 1.98/-i; 2011: 2.04/-i; 2012: -/2.02i; 2013: 2.19/2.12i; 2014: 2.20/2.16i
