= Filipa Martins (athlete) =

Portuguese sprinter (born 1992)

Filipa Martins (born 13 November 1992) is a Portuguese sprinter who specializes in the 400 metres.

Individually she finished fifth at the 2014 Mediterranean U23 Championships and competed at the 2018 Mediterranean Games without reaching the final.

In the 4 × 400 metres relay she won a silver medal at the 2014 Mediterranean U23 Championships, a gold medal at the 2018 Ibero-American Championships and finished fifth at the 2018 Mediterranean Games. She also competed at the 2014 European Championships, the 2016 European Championships and the 2018 World Indoor Championships without reaching the final. At the 2018 World Indoor Championships the team did however set a new Portuguese indoor record of 3:35.43 minutes.

Her personal best time is 53.83 seconds, achieved in July 2018 in Ávila.
