= Slovakia at the 2022 European Championships =

in (Germany) Munich 11 August 2022 – 22 August 2022
- Competitors: 76 in 11 sports
- Medals Ranked 32nd: Gold 0 Silver 1 Bronze 1 Total 2

European Championships appearances
- 2018; 2022

Slovakia competed at the 2022 European Championships in Munich from August 11 to August 22, 2022.

== Medallists ==
Medal	Name	Sport	Event	Date
Silver	Samuel Baláž; Denis Myšák; Csaba Zalka; Adam Botek	Canoeing	Men's K–4 500 metres	20 August
Bronze	Ľubomír Pištej; Barbora Balážová	Table tennis	Mixed doubles	15 August

== Competitors ==
The following is the list of number of competitors in the Championships:

Sport	Men	Women	Total
Athletics	13	6	19
Gymnastics (men and women)	1	5	6
Canoe sprint	13	4	17
Cycling BMX	2	2	4
Cycling mountain bike	2	0	2
Cycling road	6	0	6
Cycling track	2	2	4
Rowing	2	0	2
Sport climbing	2	2	4
Table tennis	4	4	8
Triathlon	1	3	4
Total	48	28	76

== Athletics ==
Slovakia entered the following athletes.

Key

- Q = Qualified for the next round
- q = Qualified for the next round as a fastest loser or, in field events, by position without achieving the qualifying target
- NR = National record
- PB = Personal best
- SB = Season best
- N/A = Round not applicable for the event

=== Men ===
Track and road events

Athlete	Event	Heat		Semifinal		Final	
Athlete	Event	Result	Rank	Result	Rank	Result	Rank
Ján Volko	100 m	10.22 SB	2 Q	10.13 =NR	5 q	10.16	4
Ján Volko	200 m	20.48 SB	3 Q	20.39 SB	8	Did not advance	
Šimon Bujna	400 m	46.79	25	Did not advance			
Matej Baluch	400 m hurdles	50.49	14 Q	50.93	23	Did not advance	
Martin Kučera	400 m hurdles	50.82	18	Did not advance			
Miroslav Marček; Patrik Dömötör; Martin Kučera; Šimon Bujna	4 × 400 m relay	3:06.98	15	—N/a		Did not advance	
Dominik Černý	20 km walk	—N/a				1:25:38	14
Miroslav Úradník	35 km walk	—N/a				2:35:44	6
Michal Morvay	35 km walk	—N/a				2:36:04	7

=== Women ===
Track and road events

Athlete	Event	Heat		Semifinal		Final	
Athlete	Event	Result	Rank	Result	Rank	Result	Rank
Viktória Forster	100 m	11.72	23	Did not advance			
Viktória Forster	100 m hurdles	13.19	3 Q	13.50	23	Did not advance	
Daniela Ledecká	400 m hurdles	56.98	12 Q	57.08	19	Did not advance	
Emma Zapletalová	400 m hurdles	58.65 SB	23	Did not advance			
Hana Burzalová	20 km walk	—N/a				1:40:31 SB	18
Ema Hačundová	35 km walk	—N/a				3:06:13 PB	14

Field events

Athlete	Event	Qualification		Final	
Athlete	Event	Distance	Position	Distance	Position
Veronika Kaňuchová	Hammer throw	65.33	21	Did not advance	

== Gymnastics ==
Slovakia has entered one male and five female athletes.

=== Men ===
Qualification

Athlete	Qualification						Total	Rank
Athlete	Apparatus						Total	Rank
Athlete	F	PH	R	V	PB	HB	Total	Rank
Matej Nemčovič								

=== Women ===
Qualification

Athlete	Event	Qualification						Final					
Athlete	Event	Apparatus				Total	Rank	Apparatus				Total	Rank
Athlete	Event	V	UB	BB	F	Total	Rank	V	UB	BB	F	Total	Rank
Adela Balcová	Team											—N/a	
Radoslava Kalamárová	Team											—N/a	
Barbora Mokošová	Team											—N/a	
Sára Surmanová	Team											—N/a	
Elena Ušáková	Team											—N/a	
Total	Team												

== Triathlon ==
Athlete	Event	Swim (1.5 km)	Trans 1	Bike (40 km)	Trans 2	Run (10 km)	Total Time	Rank
Richard Varga	Men's							
Margaréta Bičanová	Women's							
Romana Gajdošová	Women's							
Ivana Kuriačková	Women's							
Zuzana Michaličková	Women's							
