= Slovakia at the 2026 European Athletics Championships =

- Flag of Slovakia
- WA code: SVK

in Birmingham, United Kingdom 10–16 August 2026
- Competitors: 23 (9 men and 14 women)
- Medals: Gold 1 Silver 0 Bronze 0 Total 1

European Athletics Championships appearances
- 1994; 1998; 2002; 2006; 2010; 2012; 2014; 2016; 2018; 2022; 2024; 2026

Other related appearances
- Czechoslovakia (1934–1990)

Slovakia competed at the 2026 European Athletics Championships in Birmingham, United Kingdom from 10–16 August 2026.

== Medallists ==
Medal	Name	Event	Date
Gold	Emma Zapletalová	Women's 400 metres hurdles	12 August

== Results ==
Slovakia entered the following athletes.

Key

- Q = Qualified for the next round
- q = Qualified for the next round as a fastest loser or, in field events, by position without achieving the qualifying target
- NR = National record
- PB = Personal best
- SB = Season best
- N/A = Round not applicable for the event

Track and road events
Men

Athlete	Event	Heat		Semifinal		Final	
Athlete	Event	Result	Rank	Result	Rank	Result	Rank
Ján Volko	100 m	10.53	9 q	10.55	7	Did not advance	
Ján Volko	200 m	21.45	23	Did not advance			
Peter Dávid	110 m hurdles	13.94	12 q	14.04	8	Did not advance	
Matej Baluch	400 m hurdles	48.94 =NR	2 q	49.19	4	Did not advance	
Patrik Dömötör	400 m hurdles	49.71	10 q	49.67	7	Did not advance	
Dominik Černý	Marathon walk	—N/a				3:20:40	24
Michal Duda	Marathon walk	—N/a				3:20:04 PB	23
Michal Morvay	Marathon walk	—N/a				3:11:00 PB	18

Women

Athlete	Event	Heat		Semifinal		Final	
Athlete	Event	Result	Rank	Result	Rank	Result	Rank
Viktória Forster	100 m	11.51	20	Did not advance			
Viktória Korbová	200 m	23.51	17	Did not advance			
Gabriela Gajanová	800 m	2:00.27	2 Q	1:59.32	4	Did not advance	
Veronika Páleníková	Marathon	—N/a				DNS	
Viktória Forster	100 m hurdles	Bye		13.43	8	Did not advance	
Daniela Ledecká	400 m hurdles	55.93	7 q	55.22 SB	5	Did not advance	
Emma Zapletalová	400 m hurdles	Bye		54.09	1 Q	52.91	1st place, gold medalist(s)
Hana Černá	Half marathon walk	—N/a				1:39:47	19
Ema Bendová; Delia Farajpour; Viktória Forster; Viktória Korbová; Lenka Kovačovicová; Monika Weigertová	4 × 100 m relay	44.20	5	—N/a		Did not advance	
Viktória Korbová; Emma Zapletalová; Gabriela Gajanová; Daniela Ledecká	4 × 400 m relay	3:27.02 NR	6	—N/a		Did not advance	

Field events

Athlete	Event	Qualification		Final	
Athlete	Event	Distance	Position	Distance	Position
Jakub Kubínec	Men's javelin throw	77.63	16	Did not advance	
Patrik Michalec	Men's javelin throw	72.82	27	Did not advance	
Veronika Kaňuchová	Women's hammer throw	62.71	26	Did not advance	
