= Slovakia at the 2022 European Athletics Championships =

- Flag of Slovakia
- WA code: SVK
- National federation: Slovak Athletic Federation

in Munich, Germany 15 August 2022 – 21 August 2022
- Competitors: 15 (9 men and 6 women) in 13 events
- Medals: Gold 0 Silver 0 Bronze 0 Total 0

European Athletics Championships appearances
- 1994; 1998; 2002; 2006; 2010; 2012; 2014; 2016; 2018; 2022; 2024

Other related appearances
- Czechoslovakia (1934–1990)

Slovakia competed at the 2022 European Athletics Championships in Munich, Germany, between 15 and 21 August 2022

== Results ==
Slovakia entered the following athletes.

Key

- Q = Qualified for the next round
- q = Qualified for the next round as a fastest loser or, in field events, by position without achieving the qualifying target
- NR = National record
- PB = Personal best
- SB = Season best
- N/A = Round not applicable for the event

=== Men ===
Track and road events

Athlete	Event	Heat		Semifinal		Final	
Athlete	Event	Result	Rank	Result	Rank	Result	Rank
Ján Volko	100 m	10.22 SB	2 Q	10.13 =NR	5 q	10.16	4
Ján Volko	200 m	20.48 SB	3 Q	20.39 SB	8	Did not advance	
Šimon Bujna	400 m	46.79	25	Did not advance			
Matej Baluch	400 m hurdles	50.49	14 Q	50.93	23	Did not advance	
Martin Kučera	400 m hurdles	50.82	18	Did not advance			
Miroslav Marček; Patrik Dömötör; Martin Kučera; Šimon Bujna	4 × 400 m relay	3:06.98	15	—N/a		Did not advance	
Dominik Černý	20 km walk	—N/a				1:25:38	14
Miroslav Úradník	35 km walk	—N/a				2:35:44	6
Michal Morvay	35 km walk	—N/a				2:36:04	7

=== Women ===
Track and road events

Athlete	Event	Heat		Semifinal		Final	
Athlete	Event	Result	Rank	Result	Rank	Result	Rank
Viktória Forster	100 m	11.72	23	Did not advance			
Viktória Forster	100 m hurdles	13.19	3 Q	13.50	23	Did not advance	
Daniela Ledecká	400 m hurdles	56.98	12 Q	57.08	19	Did not advance	
Emma Zapletalová	400 m hurdles	58.65 SB	23	Did not advance			
Hana Burzalová	20 km walk	—N/a				1:40:31 SB	18
Ema Hačundová	35 km walk	—N/a				3:06:13 PB	14

Field events

Athlete	Event	Qualification		Final	
Athlete	Event	Distance	Position	Distance	Position
Veronika Kaňuchová	Hammer throw	65.33	21	Did not advance	
