= Slovakia at the 2025 World Athletics Championships =

- Flag of Slovakia
- WA code: SVK

in Tokyo, Japan 13 September 2025 – 21 September 2025
- Competitors: 9 (3 men and 6 women)
- Medals Ranked 41st: Gold 0 Silver 0 Bronze 1 Total 1

World Athletics Championships appearances
- 1993; 1995; 1997; 1999; 2001; 2003; 2005; 2007; 2009; 2011; 2013; 2015; 2017; 2019; 2022; 2023; 2025

Slovakia competed at the 2025 World Athletics Championships in Tokyo, Japan, from 13 to 21 September 2025.

Emma Zapletalová won a bronze medal in the 400 metres hurdles, marking the nation's first medal in the championships since the 2015 edition, when Matej Tóth won gold in the 50 km walk.

== Medalists ==
Medal	Athlete	Event	Date
Bronze	Emma Zapletalová	Women's 400 metres hurdles	September 19

== Results ==
Slovakia entered 9 athletes to the championships: 6 women and 3 men.

Key

- Q = Qualified for the next round
- q = Qualified for the next round as a fastest loser or, in field events, by position without achieving the qualifying target
- NR = National record
- PB = Personal best
- SB = Season best
- N/A = Round not applicable for the event

=== Men ===
Track and road events

Athlete	Event	Heat		Semifinal		Final	
Athlete	Event	Result	Rank	Result	Rank	Result	Rank
Patrik Dömötör	400 metres hurdles	49.91	7	Did not advance			
Dominik Černý	20 kilometres walk	—N/a				1:21:29	22
Dominik Černý	35 kilometres walk	—N/a				2:31:17	7
Michal Morvay	35 kilometres walk	—N/a				DNF	

=== Women ===
Track and road events

Athlete	Event	Heat		Semifinal		Final	
Athlete	Event	Result	Rank	Result	Rank	Result	Rank
Viktória Forster	100 metres	11.43	6	Did not advance			
Gabriela Gajanová	800 metres	2:00.44	3 Q	1:59.16	7	Did not advance	
Viktória Forster	100 metres hurdles	13.18	6	Did not advance			
Daniela Ledecká	400 metres hurdles	54.86	4 Q	54.94	6	Did not advance	
Emma Zapletalová	400 metres hurdles	54.15	2 Q	53.22	3 q	53.00	3rd place, bronze medalist(s)
Hana Burzalová	20 kilometres walk	—N/a				1:32:28	25
Hana Burzalová	35 kilometres walk	—N/a				2:51:15	12
Ema Hačundová	35 kilometres walk	—N/a				3:10:21	29
