= Slovakia at the 2024 European Athletics Championships =

- Flag of Slovakia
- WA code: SVK

in Rome, Italy 7 June 2024 – 12 June 2024
- Competitors: 18 (9 men and 9 women)
- Medals Ranked 23rd: Gold 0 Silver 1 Bronze 0 Total 1

European Athletics Championships appearances
- 1994; 1998; 2002; 2006; 2010; 2012; 2014; 2016; 2018; 2022; 2024

Other related appearances
- Czechoslovakia (1934–1990)

Slovakia competed at the 2024 European Athletics Championships in Rome, Italy from 7–12 June 2024.

== Medallists ==
Medal	Name	Event	Date
Silver	Gabriela Gajanová	Women's 800 metres	12 June

== Results ==
Slovakia entered the following athletes.

Key

- Q = Qualified for the next round
- q = Qualified for the next round as a fastest loser or, in field events, by position without achieving the qualifying target
- NR = National record
- PB = Personal best
- SB = Season best
- N/A = Round not applicable for the event

=== Men ===
Track and road events

Athlete	Event	Heat		Semifinal		Final	
Athlete	Event	Result	Rank	Result	Rank	Result	Rank
Ján Volko	100 metres	10.35 SB	13 q	10.38	18	Did not advance	
Ján Volko	200 metres	21.09	20	Did not advance			
Šimon Bujna	400 metres	46.52	20	Did not advance			
Matej Baluch	400 metres hurdles	52.17	22	Did not advance			
Patrik Dömötör	400 metres hurdles	51.16	19	Did not advance			
Dominik Černý	20 kilometres walk	—N/a				1:22:56	13
Miroslav Úradník	20 kilometres walk	—N/a				1:24:04	19

Field events

Athlete	Event	Qualification		Final	
Athlete	Event	Distance	Position	Distance	Position
Tomáš Veszelka	Triple jump	16.31	15	Did not advance	
Marcel Lomnický	Hammer throw	68.15	30	Did not advance	
Jakub Kubínec	Javelin throw	72.16	23	Did not advance	

=== Women ===
Track and road events

Athlete	Event	Heat		Semifinal		Final	
Athlete	Event	Result	Rank	Result	Rank	Result	Rank
Viktória Forster	100 metres	11.50	16	Did not advance			
Viktória Forster	100 metres hurdles	Bye		12.83 SB	8 q	13.25	8
Stanislava Škvarková	100 metres hurdles	13.44	18	Did not advance			
Gabriela Gajanová	800 metres	2:00.31	2 Q	1:59.43 SB	5 Q	1:58.79 SB	2nd place, silver medalist(s)
Daniela Ledecká	400 metres hurdles	56.17 SB	11 q	55.83 PB	20	Did not advance	
Hana Burzalová	20 kilometres walk	—N/a				1:34:43	21
Mária Czaková	20 kilometres walk	—N/a				1:34:32	20
Ema Hačundová	20 kilometres walk	—N/a				1:39:18	27

Field events

Athlete	Event	Qualification		Final	
Athlete	Event	Distance	Position	Distance	Position
Martina Hrašnová	Hammer throw	61.46	29	Did not advance	
Veronika Kaňuchová	Hammer throw	63.85	27	Did not advance	
