= Slovakia at the 2016 European Athletics Championships =

- WA code: SVK
- National federation: SAZ

in Amsterdam
- Competitors: 21
- Medals: Gold 0 Silver 0 Bronze 0 Total 0

European Athletics Championships appearances
- 1994; 1998; 2002; 2006; 2010; 2012; 2014; 2016; 2018; 2022; 2024; 2026

Other related appearances
- Czechoslovakia (1934–1990)

Slovakia competed at the 2016 European Athletics Championships in Amsterdam, Netherlands, between 6 and 10 July 2016.

== Results ==
=== Men ===
Track & road events

Athlete	Event	Heat		Semifinal		Final	
Athlete	Event	Result	Rank	Result	Rank	Result	Rank
Jakub Matúš	100 m	10.51	19	did not advance			
Ján Volko	100 m	10.42	14 Q	10.43	21	did not advance	
Ján Volko	200 m	21.00	10 Q	21.28	20	did not advance	
Jozef Repčík	800 m	1:49.32	12	did not advance			
Martin Kučera	400 m hurdles	49.56 PB	1 Q	49.08 PB	5 q	49.82	7

Field events

Athlete	Event	Qualification		Final	
Athlete	Event	Distance	Rank	Distance	Rank
Matúš Bubeník	High jump	2.23	15	did not advance	
Marcel Lomnický	Hammer throw	74.68	4 q	75.84	5
Patrik Ženúch	Javelin throw	69.38	30	did not advance	

=== Women ===
Track & road events

Athlete	Event	Heat		Semifinal		Final	
Athlete	Event	Result	Rank	Result	Rank	Result	Rank
Alexandra Bezeková	100 m	11.71	18	did not advance			
Alexandra Bezeková	200 m	23.56	15 q	23.71	23	did not advance	
Iveta Putalová	400 m	53.96	12 q	54.04	23	did not advance	
Alexandra Štuková	800 m	2:04.58	18 q	2:03.27	19	did not advance	
Lucia Hrivnák Klocová	1500 m	4:10.90	2 Q	—N/a		4:35.61	10
Lucia Slaničková	400 m hurdles	57.55	11 q	57.86	23	did not advance	
Vladimíra Šibová; Lenka Kršáková; Denis Bučková; Alexandra Bezeková	4 × 100 m relay	45.31	15	—N/a		did not advance	
Silvia Šalgovičová; Alexandra Štuková; Iveta Putálová; Alexandra Bezeková	4 × 400 m relay	3:31.66 NR	=10	—N/a		did not advance	

Field events

Athlete	Event	Qualification		Final	
Athlete	Event	Distance	Rank	Distance	Rank
Jana Velďáková	Long jump	6.47w	9 q	6.47w	10
Dana Velďáková	Triple jump	14.11 SB	4 Q	13.74	11
Martina Hrašnová	Hammer throw	68.37	10 q	70.62	7
Veronika Kaňuchová	Hammer throw	62.86	27	did not advance	
