= Slovakia at the 2022 World Athletics Championships =

- Flag of Slovakia
- WA code: SVK

in Eugene, United States 15 July 2022 – 24 July 2022
- Competitors: 5 (2 men and 3 women) in 4 events
- Medals: Gold 0 Silver 0 Bronze 0 Total 0

World Athletics Championships appearances
- 1993; 1995; 1997; 1999; 2001; 2003; 2005; 2007; 2009; 2011; 2013; 2015; 2017; 2019; 2022; 2023; 2025

Slovakia competed at the 2022 World Athletics Championships in Eugene, United States, from 15 to 24 July 2022.

== Results ==
Slovakia entered 5 athletes.

Key

- Q = Qualified for the next round
- q = Qualified for the next round as a fastest loser or, in field events, by position without achieving the qualifying target
- NR = National record
- PB = Personal best
- SB = Season best
- N/A = Round not applicable for the event

=== Men ===
Track and road events

Athlete	Event	Final	
Athlete	Event	Result	Rank
Dominik Černý	20 km walk	1:29:41	37
Miroslav Úradník	20 km walk	1:25:40	26
Dominik Černý	35 km walk	2:35:39	31 PB
Miroslav Úradník	35 km walk	2:31:16	21 PB

=== Women ===
Track and road events

Athlete	Event	Heat		Semi-final		Final	
Athlete	Event	Result	Rank	Result	Rank	Result	Rank
Daniela Ledecká	400 m hurdles	DNF		Did not advance			
Hana Burzalová	35 km walk	—N/a				2:59:32 NR	23
Ema Hačundová	35 km walk	—N/a				3:07:02 PB	32
