= Slovakia at the 2023 World Athletics Championships =

- Flag of Slovakia
- WA code: SVK

in Budapest, Hungary 19 August 2023 – 27 August 2023
- Competitors: 9 (3 men and 6 women)
- Medals: Gold 0 Silver 0 Bronze 0 Total 0

World Athletics Championships appearances
- 1993; 1995; 1997; 1999; 2001; 2003; 2005; 2007; 2009; 2011; 2013; 2015; 2017; 2019; 2022; 2023; 2025

Slovakia competed at the 2023 World Athletics Championships in Budapest, Hungary, from 19 to 27 August 2023.

== Results ==
Slovakia entered 9 athletes.

Key

- Q = Qualified for the next round
- q = Qualified for the next round as a fastest loser or, in field events, by position without achieving the qualifying target
- NR = National record
- PB = Personal best
- SB = Season best
- N/A = Round not applicable for the event

=== Men ===
Track and road events

Athlete	Event	Heat		Semifinal		Final	
Athlete	Event	Result	Rank	Result	Rank	Result	Rank
Ján Volko	100 metres	10.25	7	Did not advance			
Ján Volko	200 metres	20.69	5	Did not advance			
Dominik Černý	20 kilometres walk	—N/a				1:23:42 PB	34
Dominik Černý	35 kilometres walk	—N/a				2:32:56 PB	19
Michal Morvay	35 kilometres walk	—N/a				DQ	

=== Women ===
Track and road events

Athlete	Event	Heat		Semifinal		Final	
Athlete	Event	Result	Rank	Result	Rank	Result	Rank
Gabriela Gajanová	800 metres	2:00.39	6	Did not advance			
Viktória Forster	100 metres hurdles	13.47	8	Did not advance			
Hana Burzalová	35 kilometres walk	—N/a				3:02:47 SB	28
Ema Hačundová	35 kilometres walk	—N/a				3:05:43 SB	31
Mária Czaková	35 kilometres walk	—N/a				3:01:53 PB	25

Field events

Athlete	Event	Qualification		Final	
Athlete	Event	Distance	Position	Distance	Position
Martina Hrašnová	Hammer throw	66.28	34	Did not advance	
