= Slovakia at the 2012 European Athletics Championships =

- WA code: SVK
- National federation: SAZ

in Helsinki
- Competitors: 12
- Medals: Gold 0 Silver 1 Bronze 0 Total 1

European Athletics Championships appearances
- 1994; 1998; 2002; 2006; 2010; 2012; 2014; 2016; 2018; 2022; 2024; 2026

Other related appearances
- Czechoslovakia (1934–1990)

Slovakia competed at the 2012 European Athletics Championships held in Helsinki, Finland, between 27 June to 1 July 2012. 12 competitors, 7 men and 5 women took part in 9 events.

== Medals ==
Medal	Name	Event	Date
Silver	Martina Hrašnová	Women's hammer throw	1 July

== Results ==
=== Men ===
Track events

Event	Athletes	Heat		Semifinal		Final	
Event	Athletes	Result	Rank	Result	Rank	Result	Rank
800 m	Jozef Repčík	1:47.41	7 Q	1:46.62	2 Q	1:49.42	7
400 m hurdles	Martin Kučera	51.50	25	did not advance			

Field events

Event	Athletes	Qualification		Final	
Event	Athletes	Result	Rank	Result	Rank
High jump	Michal Kabelka	2.23	7 q	2.24	6
High jump	Peter Horák	2.19	19	did not advance	
Javelin throw	Martin Benák	70.60	26	did not advance	
Hammer throw	Marcel Lomnický	73.84	8 q	73.41	11
Hammer throw	Libor Charfreitag	69.65	26	did not advance	

=== Women ===
Track events

Event	Athletes	Heat		Semifinal		Final	
Event	Athletes	Result	Rank	Result	Rank	Result	Rank
800 m	Lucia Klocová	2:02.55	10 Q	—N/a		2:01.38	6

Field events

Event	Athletes	Qualification		Final	
Event	Athletes	Result	Rank	Result	Rank
Long jump	Jana Velďáková	6.41	11 q	6.31	10
Long jump	Renáta Medgyesová	5.95	28	did not advance	
Triple jump	Dana Velďáková	14.36	4 Q	14.24	5
Hammer throw	Martina Hrašnová	69.67	3 q	73.34	2nd place, silver medalist(s)
