= Slovakia at the 2013 World Championships in Athletics =

- WA code: SVK
- National federation: Slovak Athletic Federation
- Website: www.atletikasvk.sk

in Moscow
- Competitors: 11
- Medals: Gold 0 Silver 0 Bronze 0 Total 0

World Championships in Athletics appearances
- 1993; 1995; 1997; 1999; 2001; 2003; 2005; 2007; 2009; 2011; 2013; 2015; 2017; 2019; 2022; 2023; 2025

Slovakia competed at the 2013 World Championships in Athletics in Moscow, Russia, from 10–18 August 2013. A team of 11 athletes was announced to represent the country in the event.

== Results ==
(q – qualified, NM – no mark, SB – season best)

=== Men ===
Athlete	Event	Preliminaries		Heats		Semifinals		Final	
Athlete	Event	Time Width Height	Rank	Time Width Height	Rank	Time Width Height	Rank	Time Width Height	Rank
Adam Závacký	100 metres			10.46	41	Did not advance			
Jozef Repčík	800 metres			1:47.93	31	Did not advance			
Marcel Lomnický	Hammer throw	76.97	6 q					77.57	8
Anton Kučmín	20 kilometres walk							1:24:38	21
Matej Tóth	50 kilometres walk							3:41:07	5
Dušan Majdán	50 kilometres walk							3:57:50	29

=== Women ===
Athlete	Event	Preliminaries		Heats		Semifinals		Final	
Athlete	Event	Time Width Height	Rank	Time Width Height	Rank	Time Width Height	Rank	Time Width Height	Rank
Mária Czaková	20 kilometres walk							1:36:34	51
Mária Gáliková	20 kilometres walk							DNF	–
Jana Velďáková	Long jump	6.48	19					Did not advance	
Dana Velďáková	Triple jump	13.88	12 q					13.84	11
Martina Hrašnová	Hammer throw	68.00	21					Did not advance	

== See also ==
Slovakia at other World Championships in 2013

- Slovakia at the 2013 UCI Road World Championships
- Slovakia at the 2013 World Aquatics Championships
