= Slovakia at the 2015 World Championships in Athletics =

- WA code: SVK
- National federation: Slovak Athletic Federation
- Website: www.atletikasvk.sk

in Beijing
- Competitors: 16
- Medals Ranked 15th: Gold 1 Silver 0 Bronze 0 Total 1

World Championships in Athletics appearances
- 1993; 1995; 1997; 1999; 2001; 2003; 2005; 2007; 2009; 2011; 2013; 2015; 2017; 2019; 2022; 2023; 2025

Slovakia competed at the 2015 World Championships in Athletics in Beijing, China, from 22 to 30 August 2015.

== Medalists ==
The following competitors from Slovakia won medals at the Championships

Medal	Athlete	Event	Date
Gold	Matej Tóth	50 kilometres walk	August 29

== Results ==
(q – qualified, NM – no mark, SB – season best)

=== Men ===
Track and road events

Athlete	Event	Heat		Semifinal		Final	
Athlete	Event	Result	Rank	Result	Rank	Result	Rank
Jozef Repčík	800 metres	1:46.28	5	Did not advance			
Anton Kučmín	20 kilometres walk	—N/a				1:27.46	44
Matej Tóth	50 kilometres walk	—N/a				3:40:32	1st place, gold medalist(s)
Dušan Majdán	50 kilometres walk	—N/a				3:58:57 SB	30
Martin Tišťan	50 kilometres walk	—N/a				DQ	

Field events

Athlete	Event	Qualification		Final	
Athlete	Event	Distance	Position	Distance	Position
Matúš Bubeník	High jump	2.17	37	Did not advance	
Patrik Žeňúch	Javelin throw	69.31	33	Did not advance	
Marcel Lomnický	Hammer throw	74.51	12 q	75.79	8

=== Women ===
Track and road events

Athlete	Event	Heat		Semifinal		Final	
Athlete	Event	Result	Rank	Result	Rank	Result	Rank
Iveta Putalová	400 metres	52.52	7	Did not advance			
Lucia Klocová	800 metres	2:01.35	3 Q	1:59.14 SB	7	Did not advance	
Katarína Berešová	Marathon	—N/a				2:37:24	22
Mária Gáliková	20 kilometres walk	—N/a				1:40:06	41
Mária Czaková	20 kilometres walk	—N/a				1:36:08	30

Field events

Athlete	Event	Qualification		Final	
Athlete	Event	Distance	Position	Distance	Position
Jana Velďáková	Long jump	6.56	17	Did not advance	
Dana Velďáková	Triple jump	13.76	15	Did not advance	
Martina Hrašnová	Hammer throw	68.80	16	Did not advance	
