= Slovakia at the 2010 European Athletics Championships =

Sporting event delegation

- WA code: SVK
- National federation: SAZ

in Barcelona
- Competitors: 19
- Medals: Gold 1 Silver 0 Bronze 1 Total 2

European Athletics Championships appearances
- 1994; 1998; 2002; 2006; 2010; 2012; 2014; 2016; 2018; 2022; 2024; 2026

Other related appearances
- Czechoslovakia (1934–1990)

Slovakia was represented by 19 athletes at the 2010 European Athletics Championships held in Barcelona, Spain, from 27 July to 1 August 2010.

== Participants ==
Event	Men	Women
400 m	Peter Žňava	
800 m	Jozef Pelikán; Jozef Repčík	Lucia Klocová
100 m hurdles		Miriam Cupáková
20 km walk	Anton Kučmín; Matej Tóth	Zuzana Malíková
50 km walk	Miloš Bátovský; Dušan Majdán	
High jump	Peter Horák	
Long jump		Renáta Medgyesová; Jana Velďáková
Triple jump	Dmitrij Vaľukevič	Dana Velďáková
Hammer throw	Libor Charfreitag; Miloslav Konopka; Marcel Lomnický	
Javelin throw	Martin Benák	

== Results ==
2010 Barcelona	Gold	Silver	Bronze	Total
Slovakia (SVK)	1	0	1	2
