= Slovakia at the 2011 World Championships in Athletics =

- WA code: SVK
- National federation: Slovenský atletický zväz
- Website: www.atletikasvk.sk

in Daegu
- Competitors: 8
- Medals: Gold 0 Silver 0 Bronze 0 Total 0

World Championships in Athletics appearances
- 1993; 1995; 1997; 1999; 2001; 2003; 2005; 2007; 2009; 2011; 2013; 2015; 2017; 2019; 2022; 2023

Slovakia competed at the 2011 World Championships in Athletics from 27 August to 4 September in Daegu, South Korea. A team of 8 athletes was announced to represent the country in the event. The team is led by walker Matej Tóth competing in both 20 km and 50 km race walking events, and European Athletics Indoor Championships triple jump bronze medalist Dana Veldaková.

== Results ==
=== Men ===
Athlete	Event	Preliminaries		Heats		Semifinals		Final	
Athlete	Event	Time Width Height	Rank	Time Width Height	Rank	Time Width Height	Rank	Time Width Height	Rank
Matej Tóth	20 kilometres walk							1:22:55	14
Anton Kučmín	20 kilometres walk							1:23:57	18
Miloš Bátovský	50 kilometres walk							DSQ	
Matej Tóth	50 kilometres walk							DNF	
Libor Charfreitag	Hammer throw	72.20	22					Did not advance	
Marcel Lomnický	Hammer throw	72.68	21					Did not advance	

=== Women ===
Athlete	Event	Preliminaries		Heats		Semifinals		Final	
Athlete	Event	Time Width Height	Rank	Time Width Height	Rank	Time Width Height	Rank	Time Width Height	Rank
Lucia Klocová	800 metres			2:02.81	23	2:01.85	20	Did not advance	
Mária Czaková	20 kilometres walk							1:39:07	31
Dana Velďáková	Triple jump	14.28	9					13.96	11
