= Slovakia at the 2017 World Championships in Athletics =

- WA code: SVK
- Website: www.atletikasvk.sk

in London
- Competitors: 5
- Medals: Gold 0 Silver 0 Bronze 0 Total 0

World Championships in Athletics appearances
- 1993; 1995; 1997; 1999; 2001; 2003; 2005; 2007; 2009; 2011; 2013; 2015; 2017; 2019; 2022; 2023; 2025

Slovakia participated in the 2017 World Championships in Athletics in London, Great Britain, from 4–13 August 2017. The five-member Slovak contingent did not win any medals at this edition of the Games.

== Results ==
(q – qualified, NM – no mark, SB – season best)

=== Men ===
Track and road events

Athlete	Event	Preliminary Round		Heat		Semifinal		Final	
Athlete	Event	Result	Rank	Result	Rank	Result	Rank	Result	Rank
Ján Volko	100 metres	10.15 NR	1 Q	10.25	28	Did not advance			
Ján Volko	200 metres	—N/a		20.52	20 Q	20.61	15	Did not advance	
Dušan Majdán	50 kilometres walk	—N/a						DNF	–

Field events

Athlete	Event	Qualification		Final	
Athlete	Event	Distance	Position	Distance	Position
Marcel Lomnický	Hammer throw	74.26	13	Did not advance	

=== Women ===
Track and road events

Athlete	Event	Final	
Athlete	Event	Result	Rank
Mária Czaková	20 kilometres walk	1:35:11	36

Field events

Athlete	Event	Qualification		Final	
Athlete	Event	Distance	Position	Distance	Position
Nikola Lomnická	Hammer throw	64.60	28	Did not advance	
