= Gabriela Hanuláková =

Slovak athlete (1957–2024)

Personal information
- Nationality: Slovak
- Born: 6 March 1957 Trnava, Czechoslovakia
- Died: 22 January 2024 (aged 66)

Sport
- Sport: Track and Field
- Events: Shot put, discus throw

Achievements and titles
- Personal bests: Shot put: 16.98m (1985, NR); Discus throw: 64m (1984, NR)

Gabriela Hanuláková (6 March 1957 – 22 January 2024) was a Slovak track and field athlete and athletic coach. She set Slovak national records in shot put (in 1985) and discus throw (in 1986), which still stood at the time of her death in 2024.

== Biography ==
Gabriela Hanuláková was born on 6 March 1957 in Trnava. In the beginning of her career she competed out of her hometown and was coached by Anna Vávrová, Anton Hajmássy and Libor Charfreitag senior. From 1977 she competed for Slávia Bratislava, under coach Anton Ihring.

Hanuláková made her debut internationally at the 1975 European Athletics Junior Championships in Athens, where she finished eighth in the shot put. At the 1985 Summer Universiade in Kobe she placed fifth in the same discipline. Hanuláková became the Slovak champion in shot put eight times and six times in the discus throw. In 1986 she became the Czechoslovak champion in the discus throw, interrupting 5 years of dominance from Zdeňka Šilhavá.

Hanuláková was the first Slovak woman to beat the thresholds of 15 and 16 metres in the shot put as well as 50 and 60 metres in the discus throw. In the shot put she improved the Slovak national record nine times and in the discus throw thirteen times. At the time of her death, she still held the national record in both disciplines.

After retiring from active athletics, Hanuláková was active as a coach. Among others, she was a coach of the hurdler Martin Kučera.

== Recognition ==
In November 2023 Hanuláková was awarded the European Athletics Women Leadership Award.

== Death ==
Hanuláková died on 22 January 2024, at the age of 66.
