= 2011 European Athletics U23 Championships – Men's 400 metres hurdles =

The Men's 400 metres hurdles event at the 2011 European Athletics U23 Championships was held in Ostrava, Czech Republic, at Městský stadion on 14, 15 and 16 July.

== Medalists ==
Gold	Jack Green; United Kingdom
Silver	Nathan Woodward; United Kingdom
Bronze	Emir Bekrić; Serbia

== Results ==
=== Final ===
16 July 2011 / 16:15

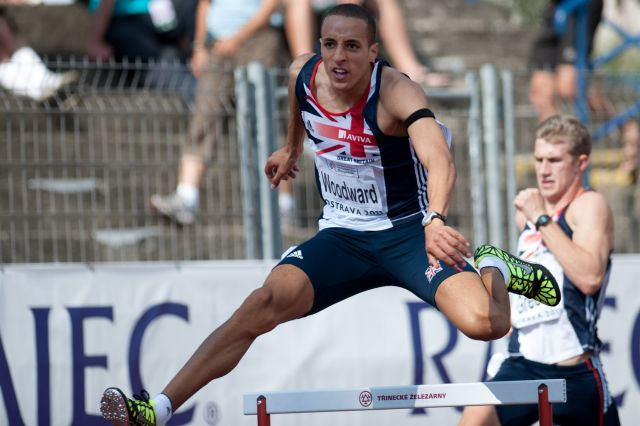
Silver medalist, Nathan Woodward

Rank	Name	Nationality	Lane	Reaction Time	Time	Notes
1st place, gold medalist(s)	Jack Green	United Kingdom	7	0.194	49.13	
2nd place, silver medalist(s)	Nathan Woodward	United Kingdom	6	0.178	49.28	
3rd place, bronze medalist(s)	Emir Bekrić	Serbia	3	0.198	49.61	NR
4	Nikita Andriyanov	Russia	5	0.180	49.62	PB
5	Hugo Grillas	France	1	0.202	49.76	PB
6	David Gollnow	Germany	2	0.201	49.97	PB
7	Tibor Koroknai	Hungary	8	0.225	50.28	PB
8	Niall Flannery	United Kingdom	4	0.188	50.32	

=== Semifinals ===
Qualified: First 2 in each heat (Q) and 2 best performers (q) advance to the Final

==== Summary ====
Rank	Name	Nationality	Time	Notes
1	Nathan Woodward	United Kingdom	49.59	Q
2	Nikita Andriyanov	Russia	50.12	Q PB
3	Niall Flannery	United Kingdom	50.16	Q
4	David Gollnow	Germany	50.21	q PB
5	Tibor Koroknai	Hungary	50.31	Q PB
6	Emir Bekrić	Serbia	50.41	Q
7	Hugo Grillas	France	50.45	q
8	Tobias Giehl	Germany	50.56	PB
9	Jack Green	United Kingdom	50.86	Q
10	Petteri Monni	Finland	51.09	PB
10	Denys Teslenko	Ukraine	51.09	
12	Simon Thieury	France	51.10	PB
13	Giacomo Panizza	Italy	51.31	
14	Jonathan Puemi	Switzerland	51.70	
15	Michał Pietrzak	Poland	51.76	
16	Robert Bryliński	Poland	51.77	
17	Paul Byrne	Ireland	51.93	
18	Karim Manaoui	Switzerland	51.97	
19	Tim Crowe	Ireland	52.44	
20	Kariem Hussein	Switzerland	52.55	
21	Mikita Yakauleu	Belarus	52.59	
22	Xavier Carrión	Spain	52.65	
23	Christian Heimann	Germany	52.69	
24	Andrea Gallina	Italy	53.41	

==== Details ====
===== Semifinal 1 =====
15 July 2011 / 15:50

Rank	Name	Nationality	Lane	Reaction Time	Time	Notes
1	Nathan Woodward	United Kingdom	6	0.169	49.59	Q
2	Nikita Andriyanov	Russia	5	0.182	50.12	Q PB
3	David Gollnow	Germany	4	0.193	50.21	q PB
4	Petteri Monni	Finland	7	0.232	51.09	PB
5	Simon Thieury	France	8	0.224	51.10	PB
6	Jonathan Puemi	Switzerland	2	0.182	51.70	
7	Tim Crowe	Ireland	3	0.179	52.44	
8	Xavier Carrión	Spain	1	0.160	52.65	

===== Semifinal 2 =====
15 July 2011 / 15:56

Rank	Name	Nationality	Lane	Reaction Time	Time	Notes
1	Niall Flannery	United Kingdom	4	0.234	50.16	Q
2	Tibor Koroknai	Hungary	7	0.292	50.31	Q PB
3	Hugo Grillas	France	6	0.269	50.45	q
4	Tobias Giehl	Germany	3	0.188	50.56	PB
5	Giacomo Panizza	Italy	5	0.241	51.31	
6	Robert Bryliński	Poland	8	0.198	51.77	
7	Paul Byrne	Ireland	1	0.239	51.93	
8	Karim Manaoui	Switzerland	2	0.188	51.97	

===== Semifinal 3 =====
15 July 2011 / 16:02

Rank	Name	Nationality	Lane	Reaction Time	Time	Notes
1	Emir Bekrić	Serbia	5	0.239	50.41	Q
2	Jack Green	United Kingdom	4	0.216	50.86	Q
3	Denys Teslenko	Ukraine	6	0.253	51.09	
4	Michał Pietrzak	Poland	7	0.286	51.76	
5	Kariem Hussein	Switzerland	2	0.204	52.55	
6	Mikita Yakauleu	Belarus	3	0.226	52.59	
7	Christian Heimann	Germany	8	0.220	52.69	
8	Andrea Gallina	Italy	1	0.180	53.41	

=== Heats ===
Qualified: First 4 in each heat (Q) and 4 best performers (q) advance to the Semifinals

==== Summary ====
Rank	Name	Nationality	Time	Notes
1	Nathan Woodward	United Kingdom	50.85	Q
2	Emir Bekrić	Serbia	50.96	Q
2	Hugo Grillas	France	50.96	Q
4	Nikita Andriyanov	Russia	50.99	Q
5	Niall Flannery	United Kingdom	51.14	Q
6	Jack Green	United Kingdom	51.23	Q
7	Tim Crowe	Ireland	51.24	Q PB
8	Mikita Yakauleu	Belarus	51.27	Q SB
9	Denys Teslenko	Ukraine	51.29	Q
10	David Gollnow	Germany	51.30	Q
11	Tibor Koroknai	Hungary	51.33	Q
12	Tobias Giehl	Germany	51.42	Q
13	Giacomo Panizza	Italy	51.46	Q
14	Petteri Monni	Finland	51.56	Q
15	Michał Pietrzak	Poland	51.59	Q
16	Karim Manaoui	Switzerland	51.66	q
17	Robert Bryliński	Poland	51.72	Q
18	Kariem Hussein	Switzerland	51.75	q SB
19	Simon Thieury	France	51.77	Q
20	Jonathan Puemi	Switzerland	51.78	Q
21	Andrea Gallina	Italy	51.86	q
22	Christian Heimann	Germany	51.87	Q
23	Paul Byrne	Ireland	51.90	Q
24	Xavier Carrión	Spain	51.97	q SB
25	Artem Ahkozov	Ukraine	52.04	
26	Anders Erlend Idås	Norway	52.07	
26	Lazar Katuchev	Bulgaria	52.07	
28	Radek Fischer	Czech Republic	52.09	
29	Florian Mayrhofer	Austria	52.21	PB
30	Francisco Colomar	Spain	52.72	
31	Javier Cartagena	Spain	52.82	
31	Valdas Valintėlis	Lithuania	52.82	
33	Ilia Eligulashvili	Israel	53.77	
	Tomáš Krikal	Czech Republic	DNS	

==== Details ====
===== Heat 1 =====
14 July 2011 / 12:00

Rank	Name	Nationality	Lane	Reaction Time	Time	Notes
1	Emir Bekrić	Serbia	5	0.200	50.96	Q
2	Nikita Andriyanov	Russia	3	0.189	50.99	Q
3	Mikita Yakauleu	Belarus	6	0.244	51.27	Q SB
4	Simon Thieury	France	8	0.217	51.77	Q
5	Andrea Gallina	Italy	4	0.188	51.86	q
6	Xavier Carrión	Spain	7	0.167	51.97	q SB
	Tomáš Krikal	Czech Republic	2		DNS	

===== Heat 2 =====
14 July 2011 / 12:07

Rank	Name	Nationality	Lane	Reaction Time	Time	Notes
1	Niall Flannery	United Kingdom	4	0.197	51.14	Q
2	Tobias Giehl	Germany	5	0.174	51.42	Q
3	Robert Bryliński	Poland	6	0.181	51.72	Q
4	Jonathan Puemi	Switzerland	3	0.192	51.78	Q
5	Lazar Katuchev	Bulgaria	7	0.192	52.07	
6	Javier Cartagena	Spain	8	0.214	52.82	
7	Ilia Eligulashvili	Israel	2	0.202	53.77	

===== Heat 3 =====
14 July 2011 / 12:14

Rank	Name	Nationality	Lane	Reaction Time	Time	Notes
1	Hugo Grillas	France	3	0.236	50.96	Q
2	Giacomo Panizza	Italy	4	0.283	51.46	Q
3	Christian Heimann	Germany	6	0.175	51.87	Q
4	Paul Byrne	Ireland	2	0.198	51.90	Q
5	Artem Ahkozov	Ukraine	5	0.198	52.04	
6	Radek Fischer	Czech Republic	7	0.182	52.09	

===== Heat 4 =====
14 July 2011 / 12:21

Rank	Name	Nationality	Lane	Reaction Time	Time	Notes
1	Jack Green	United Kingdom	3	0.182	51.23	Q
2	Denys Teslenko	Ukraine	6	0.210	51.29	Q
3	Petteri Monni	Finland	4	0.212	51.56	Q
4	Michał Pietrzak	Poland	5	0.211	51.59	Q
5	Kariem Hussein	Switzerland	7	0.198	51.75	q SB
6	Anders Erlend Idås	Norway	2	0.161	52.07	
7	Francisco Colomar	Spain	8	0.153	52.72	

===== Heat 5 =====
14 July 2011 / 12:28

Rank	Name	Nationality	Lane	Reaction Time	Time	Notes
1	Nathan Woodward	United Kingdom	5	0.187	50.85	Q
2	Tim Crowe	Ireland	4	0.176	51.24	Q PB
3	David Gollnow	Germany	6	0.192	51.30	Q
4	Tibor Koroknai	Hungary	3	0.228	51.33	Q
5	Karim Manaoui	Switzerland	2	0.189	51.66	q
6	Florian Mayrhofer	Austria	7	0.228	52.21	PB
7	Valdas Valintėlis	Lithuania	8	0.207	52.82	

== Participation ==
According to an unofficial count, 33 athletes from 20 countries participated in the event.

- Austria (1)
- Belarus (1)
- Bulgaria (1)
- Czech Republic (1)
- Finland (1)
- France (2)
- Germany (3)
- Hungary (1)
- Ireland (2)
- Israel (1)
- Italy (2)
- Lithuania (1)
- Norway (1)
- Poland (2)
- Russia (1)
- Serbia (1)
- Spain (3)
- Switzerland (3)
- Ukraine (2)
- United Kingdom (3)
