= Kariem Hussein =

Swiss hurdler (born 1989)

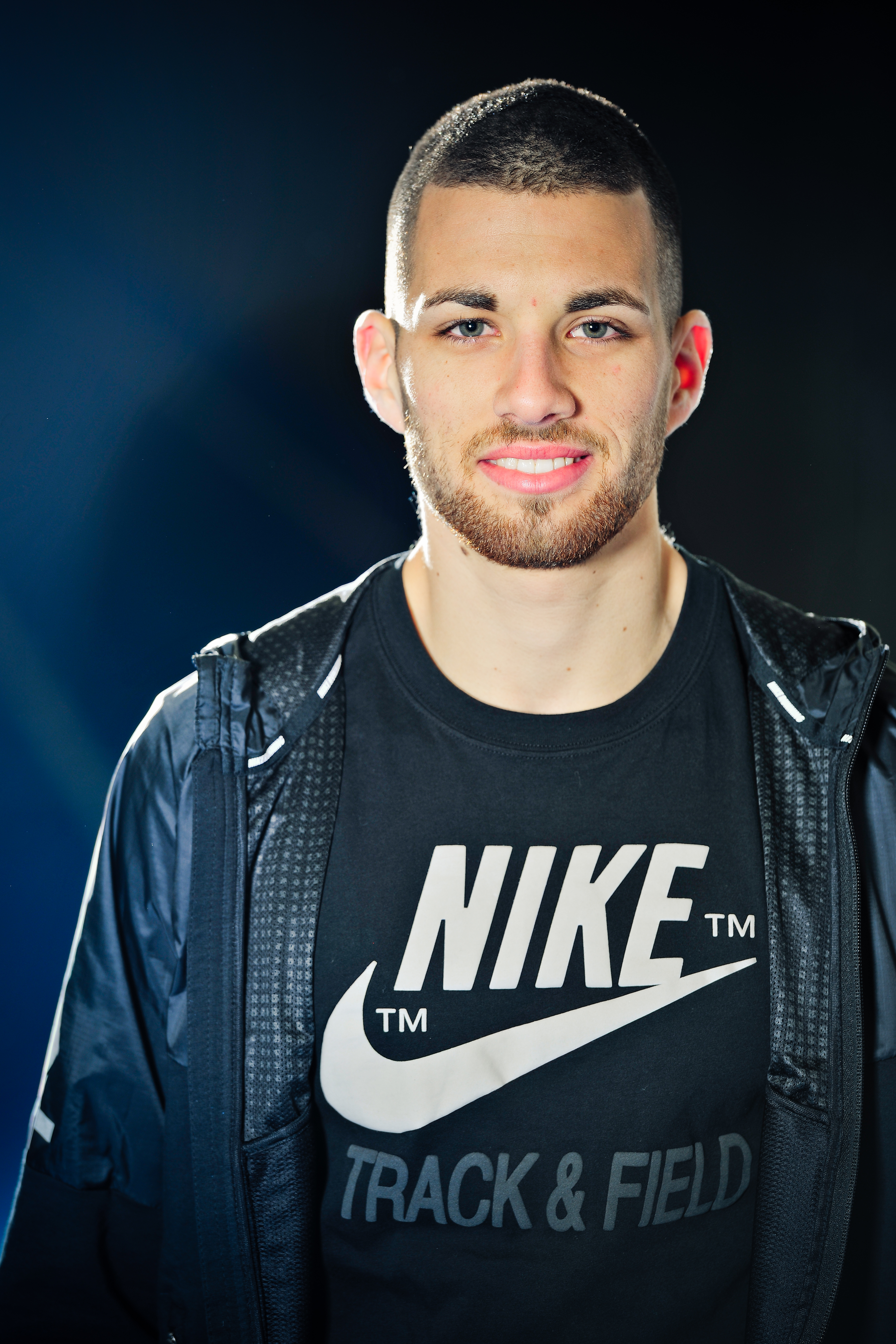
- Hussein in 2014

Personal information
- Nationality: Swiss, Egyptian
- Born: 4 January 1989 (age 37) Münsterlingen, Switzerland
- Education: University of Fribourg
- Height: 1.90 m (6 ft 3 in)
- Weight: 77 kg (170 lb)

Sport
- Country: Switzerland
- Sport: Athletics
- Event: 400 m hurdles
- Club: LC Zürich
- Coached by: Flavio Zberg (2012-2017); Laurent Meuwly (since 2017)
Medal record
European Championships
Gold medal – first place	2014 Zurich	400 m hurdles
Bronze medal – third place	2016 Amsterdam	400 m hurdles
Continental Cup
Silver medal – second place	2014 Marrakesh	400 m hurdles

Kariem Hussein (born 4 January 1989) is a Swiss athlete who specialises in the 400 metres hurdles. His first major success was the gold medal at the 2014 European Championships in Zurich. His personal best in the event is 48.45, set at a meeting in Zug in 2015 and again at Weltklasse Zürich in 2017. It is also technically his fastest flat 400 m because he has not attempted the distance since 2009 when his PR was 48.58.

Hussein was born in Münsterlingen. His father, a former international volleyball player, is Egyptian and his mother is Swiss.

== Doping ==
On 23 July 2021 he was banned by the Swiss Anti-Doping Agency from competing for 9 months, after a banned substance (nikethamide) was confirmed in the probes taken from him. This decision meant Hussein missed the 2020 Summer Olympics in Tokyo.

== Competition record ==
Year	Competition	Venue	Position	Event	Notes
Representing Switzerland
2011	European U23 Championships	Ostrava, Czech Republic	20th (sf)	400 m hurdles	52.55
2011	European U23 Championships	Ostrava, Czech Republic	5th (h)	4 × 400 m relay	3:15.11
2012	European Championships	Helsinki, Finland	19th (sf)	400 m hurdles	50.81
2013	Universiade	Kazan, Russia	13th (sf)	400 m hurdles	51.94
2013	Jeux de la Francophonie	Nice, France	3rd	4 × 400 m relay	3:07.21
2014	European Championships	Zurich, Switzerland	1st	400 m hurdles	48.96
2015	World Championships	Beijing, China	9th (sf)	400 m hurdles	48.59
2016	European Championships	Amsterdam, Netherlands	3rd	400 m hurdles	49.10
2016	Olympic Games	Rio de Janeiro, Brazil	31st (h)	400 m hurdles	49.80
2017	World Championships	London, United Kingdom	8th	400 m hurdles	50.07
2019	World Championships	Doha, Qatar	28th (h)	400 m hurdles	50.62
