= 2016 European Athletics Championships – Men's 400 metres hurdles =

Men's 400 metres hurdles at the European Athletics Championships
- Venue: Olympic Stadium
- Location: Amsterdam
- Dates: 6 July (round 1); 7 July (semifinals); 8 July (final)
- Competitors: 39 from 21 nations
- Winning time: 48.98

Medalists
gold medal	Yasmani Copello	Turkey
silver medal	Sergio Fernández	Spain
bronze medal	Kariem Hussein	Switzerland

The men's 400 metres hurdles at the 2016 European Athletics Championships took place at the Olympic Stadium on 6, 7 and 8 July.

== Records ==
Standing records prior to the 2016 European Athletics Championships
World record	Kevin Young (USA)	46.78	Barcelona, Spain	6 August 1992
European record	Stéphane Diagana (FRA)	47.37	Lausanne, Switzerland	5 July 1995
Championship record	Harald Schmid (FRG)	47.48	Athens, Greece	8 September 1982
World Leading	Johnny Dutch (USA)	48.10	Kingston, Jamaica	11 June 2016
European Leading	Yasmani Copello (TUR)	48.79	Oslo, Norway	9 June 2016

== Schedule ==
Date	Time	Round
6 July 2016	17:05	Round 1
7 July 2016	16:15	Semifinals
8 July 2016	19:40	Final

All times are local times (UTC+2)

== Results ==
=== Round 1 ===
First 2 in each heat (Q) and the next fastest 4 (q) advance to the Semifinals.

Rank	Heat	Lane	Name	Nationality	Time	Note
1	4	7	Martin Kučera	Slovakia	49.56	Q, PB
2	1	8	Thomas Barr	Ireland	50.17	Q, SB
3	2	2	Tobias Giehl	Germany	50.30	Q
4	4	6	Oskari Mörö	Finland	50.37	Q
5	1	4	Jaak-Heinrich Jagor	Estonia	50.54	Q
6	4	8	Stanislav Melnykov	Ukraine	50.57	q, SB
7	1	7	Robert Bryliński	Poland	50.74	q
8	1	5	Vít Müller	Czech Republic	50.80	q
9	4	5	Michal Brož	Czech Republic	50.83	q
10	3	6	Patryk Adamczyk	Poland	51.00	Q
11	1	6	Øyvind Kjerpeset	Norway	51.05	
12	3	7	Mario Lambrughi	Italy	51.06	Q
13	3	5	Felix Franz	Germany	51.21	
14	2	6	Mattia Contini	Italy	51.26	Q
14	4	3	Janis Baltušs	Latvia	51.26	
16	3	8	Tibor Koroknai	Hungary	51.32	
17	2	3	Nicolai Hartling	Denmark	51.49	
18	1	2	Denys Nechyporenko	Ukraine	51.53	
19	1	3	Dany Brand	Switzerland	51.60	
20	3	4	Dominik Hufnagl	Austria	51.88	
21	3	2	Javier Delgado	Spain	52.15	
22	3	3	Jussi Kanervo	Finland	52.35	
23	4	2	Maor Szeged	Israel	52.52	
24	2	5	Paul Byrne	Ireland	53.12	
25	4	4	Jakub Smoliński	Poland	53.27	
26	2	7	Arnaud Ghislain	Belgium	53.65	
	2	4	Anatoliy Synyanskyy	Ukraine	DNF	

=== Semifinals ===
First 2 (Q) and next 2 fastest (q) qualify for the final.

Rank	Heat	Lane	Name	Nationality	Time	Note
1	2	5	Yasmani Copello*	Turkey	48.42	Q, NR
2	1	3	Karsten Warholm*	Norway	48.84	Q, NR
3	1	5	Kariem Hussein*	Switzerland	48.87	Q, SB
4	1	6	Jack Green*	Great Britain	48.98	q, SB
5	1	4	Martin Kučera	Slovakia	49.08	q, PB
6	3	5	Sergio Fernández*	Spain	49.20	Q
7	2	3	Rhys Williams*	Great Britain	49.22	Q, =SB
8	2	4	Mamadou Kasse Hann*	France	49.28	
9	3	3	Oskari Mörö	Finland	49.37	Q, SB
10	1	8	Tobias Giehl	Germany	49.50	PB
10	3	6	Rasmus Mägi*	Estonia	49.50	
12	2	2	Mario Lambrughi	Italy	49.60	PB
13	2	7	Jaak-Heinrich Jagor	Estonia	49.65	SB
14	3	4	Tom Burton*	Great Britain	49.71	
15	2	8	Michaël Bultheel*	Belgium	49.72	
16	1	7	José Reynaldo Bencosme*	Italy	49.77	
17	3	2	Thomas Barr	Ireland	50.09	SB
18	1	1	Patryk Adamczyk	Poland	50.12	PB
19	3	7	Robert Bryliński	Poland	50.42	
20	1	2	Vít Müller	Czech Republic	50.70	
21	3	8	Mattia Contini	Italy	50.78	
22	3	1	Michal Brož	Czech Republic	50.85	
23	2	1	Stanislav Melnykov	Ukraine	51.06	
	2	6	Mark Ujakpor*	Spain	DNF	

*Athletes who received a bye to the semifinals

=== Final ===
Rank	Lane	Name	Nationality	Time	Note
1st place, gold medalist(s)	6	Yasmani Copello	Turkey	48.98	
2nd place, silver medalist(s)	5	Sergio Fernández	Spain	49.06	
3rd place, bronze medalist(s)	3	Kariem Hussein	Switzerland	49.10	
4	7	Oskari Mörö	Finland	49.24	SB
5	8	Rhys Williams	Great Britain	49.63	
6	4	Karsten Warholm	Norway	49.82	
7	1	Martin Kučera	Slovakia	49.82	
	2	Jack Green	Great Britain	DNF	
