= Tobias Giehl =

German hurdler (born 1991)

Personal information
- Born: 25 July 1991 (age 34)

Sport
- Sport: Athletics
- Event: 400 metres hurdles
- Club: LG Stadtwerke München
- Coached by: Peter Rabenseifner; Korbinian Mayr

Tobias Giehl (born 25 July 1991 in Munich) is a German athlete specialising in the 400 metres hurdles. He won the gold medal at the 2009 European Junior Championships.

His personal best in the event is 49.48 seconds set in Mönchengladbach in 2016.

== International competitions ==
Year	Competition	Venue	Position	Event	Notes
Representing Germany
2009	European Junior Championships	Novi Sad, Serbia	1st	400 m hurdles	50.85
2010	World Junior Championships	Moncton, Canada	10th (sf)	400 m hurdles	51.77
2010	World Junior Championships	Moncton, Canada	6th	4 × 400 m relay	3:09.08
2011	European U23 Championships	Ostrava, Czech Republic	8th (sf)	400 m hurdles	50.56
2012	European Championships	Helsinki, Finland	9th (sf)	400 m hurdles	49.95
2016	European Championships	Amsterdam, Netherlands	10th (sf)	400 m hurdles	49.50
