= Slovakia at the 2018 European Championships =

- IOC code: SVK

in (United Kingdom) Glasgow (Germany) Berlin 2 August 2018 – 12 August 2018
- Competitors: 64 in 6 sports
- Medals Ranked 29th: Gold 0 Silver 1 Bronze 0 Total 1

European Championships appearances
- 2018; 2022

Slovakia competed at the inaugural 7 sports 2018 European Championships from 2 to 12 August 2018. It competed in 6 sports.

== Medallists ==
Medal	Name	Sport	Event	Date
Silver	Matej Tóth	Athletics	Men's 50 kilometres walk	7 August
