= 2011 European Athletics U23 Championships – Women's 800 metres =

The women's 800 metres at the 2011 European Athletics U23 Championships were held at the Městský stadion on 14 and 15 July.

On 30 April 2013, it was announced that the winner of the gold medal, Elena Arzhakova had been suspended for two years from January 2013 for a doping violation, and was to be stripped of all results gained since July 11, 2011.

== Medalists ==
Gold	Merve Aydın; Turkey (TUR)
Silver	(United Kingdom) Lynsey Sharp; Great Britain (GBR)
Bronze	Aleksandra Bulanova; Russia (GBR)

=== Before reclassification under IAAF antidoping rules ===
Gold	Elena Arzhakova; Russia (RUS)
Silver	Merve Aydın; Turkey (TUR)
Bronze	(United Kingdom) Lynsey Sharp; Great Britain (GBR)

== Schedule ==
Date	Time	Round
14 July 2011	16:35	Round 1
15 July 2011	16:40	Final

== Results ==
=== Heats ===
Qualification: First 3 in each heat (Q) and 2 best performers (q) advance to the Final.

Rank	Heat	Name	Nationality	React	Time	Notes
1	2	Mirela Lavric	Romania		2:04.00	Q
2	2	Katarzyna Broniatowska	Poland		2:04.45	Q
3	1	Merve Aydın	Turkey		2:04.48	Q
4	1	Lynsey Sharp	Great Britain		2:04.58	Q
5	2	Elena Arzhakova	Russia		DQ	Q
6	1	Alexandra Bulanova	Russia		2:04.72	Q
7	1	Selina Büchel	Switzerland		2:04.85	q, PB
8	2	Anne Kesselring	Germany		2:04.90	q
9	2	Natalija Piliušina	Lithuania		2:05.56	
10	1	Joanna Jóźwik	Poland		2:06.07	
11	1	Eléni Theodorakopoúlou	Greece		2:07.04	
11	2	Monika Flis	Poland		2:07.04	
13	1	Mihaela Nunu	Romania		2:07.49	
14	2	Olha Bibik	Ukraine		2:08.92	

=== Final ===
Rank	Name	Nationality	React	Time	Notes
1st place, gold medalist(s)	Merve Aydın	Turkey		2:00.46	SB
2nd place, silver medalist(s)	Lynsey Sharp	Great Britain		2:00.65	PB
3rd place, bronze medalist(s)	Alexandra Bulanova	Russia		2:01.40	
4	Anne Kesselring	Germany		2:02.97	
5	Selina Büchel	Switzerland		2:04.25	PB
6	Katarzyna Broniatowska	Poland		2:04.62	
7	Mirela Lavric	Romania		2:12.99	
DQ	~~Elena Arzhakova~~	Russia		DQ	

== Participation ==
According to an unofficial count, 14 athletes from 10 countries participated in the event.

- Germany (1)
- Greece (1)
- Lithuania (1)
- Poland (3)
- Romania (2)
- Russia (2)
- Switzerland (1)
- Turkey (1)
- Ukraine (1)
- United Kingdom (1)
