= Nathan Woodward =

British track and field athlete

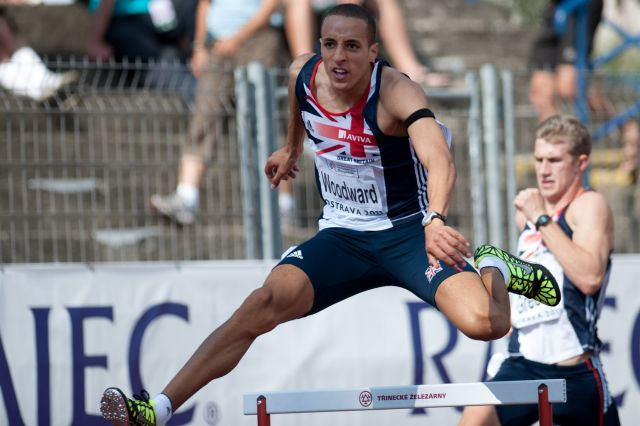
- Woodward at the 2011 European Athletics U23 Championships

Personal information
- Born: 17 October 1989 (age 36) Solihull, England

Sport
- Sport: Track and field
- Event: 400 metre hurdles
- College team: Loughborough University
- Club: Tamworth Athletics Club
- Coached by: Nick Dakin

Achievements and titles
- Personal best: 400 m hurdles 48.71 (La Chaux-de-Fonds 2011)

Nathan Steven Woodward (born 17 October 1989) is a British former track and field athlete who competed in the 400 metre hurdles.

== Biography ==
Born in Solihull, he attended Water Orton Primary School and The Coleshill Secondary School. At age 11 he took up athletics and excelled in the 800 metres and in combined events, before switching to the 400 metre hurdles at age 16. After his A levels he moved to Loughborough University to study Human Biology and pursue his athletics career.

He competed at his first senior championship in 2010, finishing fourth in his semi-final at the 2010 European Athletics Championships.

Woodward became the British 400 metres hurdles champion after winning the 2011 British Athletics Championships.

He won a silver medal at the 2011 European Athletics U23 Championships, behind countryman Jack Green. Nathan was selected for the British team for the 2011 World Championships in Athletics, in the 400m hurdles. He finished second in his heat to advance to the semi-finals, in which he finished sixth and was eliminated.

In 2012, he finished third in the UK Olympic trials, behind Dai Greene and Jack Green, who secured their places, leaving the third place to be decided at the European Championships. Rhys Williams won gold in the 400 hurdles at the 2012 European Athletics Championships, whereas Woodward finished seventh as he was just recovering from an injury. He was therefore not selected for the 2012 Olympic team despite having the A Standard.
