= 2012 European Athletics Championships – Men's 400 metres hurdles =

Men's 400 metres hurdles at the European Athletics Championships

The men's 400 metres hurdles at the 2012 European Athletics Championships was held at the Helsinki Olympic Stadium on 27, 28 and 29 June.

== Medalists ==
Gold	Rhys Williams; Great Britain
Silver	Emir Bekrić; Serbia
Bronze	Stanislav Melnykov; Ukraine

== Records ==
Standing records prior to the 2012 European Athletics Championships
World record	Kevin Young (USA)	46.78	Barcelona, Spain	6 August 1992
European record	Stéphane Diagana (FRA)	47.37	Lausanne, Switzerland	5 July 1995
Championship record	Harald Schmid (FRG)	47.48	Athens, Greece	8 September 1982
World Leading	Javier Culson (PUR)	47.92	Oslo, Norway	7 June 2012
European Leading	Dai Greene (GBR)	48.96	Rabat, Morocco	27 May 2012

== Schedule ==
Date	Time	Round
27 June 2012	10:50	Round 1
28 June 2012	13:15	Semifinals
29 June 2012	22:05	Final

== Results ==
=== Round 1 ===
First 3 in each heat (Q) and 6 best performers (q) advance to the Semifinals.

Rank	Heat	Lane	Name	Nationality	Time	Note
1	2	7	Michaël Bultheel	Belgium	49.65	Q
2	2	8	Adrien Clémenceau	France	49.84	Q, SB
3	1	5	Tobias Giehl	Germany	49.98	Q
4	3	5	Nathan Woodward	Great Britain	50.02	Q
5	4	7	Georg Fleischhauer	Germany	50.22	Q
6	1	3	Periklis Iakovakis	Greece	50.25	Q
7	2	4	Aleksandr Derevyagin	Russia	50.32	Q
8	5	8	Stanislav Melnykov	Ukraine	50.33	Q
9	6	7	Rhys Williams	Great Britain	50.40	Q
10	1	7	Mikita Yakauleu	Belarus	50.47	Q, PB
11	3	6	Josef Prorok	Czech Republic	50.57	Q
12	6	3	Václav Barák	Czech Republic	50.58	Q
13	4	5	Thomas Barr	Ireland	50.59	Q, SB
14	3	2	Rasmus Mägi	Estonia	50.61	Q
15	4	8	Emir Bekrić	Serbia	50.73	Q
16	5	4	Jorge Paula	Portugal	50.74	Q, SB
17	5	6	Diego Cabello	Spain	50.89	Q
18	2	3	Michal Brož	Czech Republic	50.91	q, PB
19	1	4	Vladimir Antmanis	Russia	50.92	q
20	6	8	Kariem Hussein	Switzerland	50.94	Q
21	5	5	Marek Plawgo	Poland	50.96	q
22	3	7	Spirídon Papadópoulos	Greece	51.01	q
23	6	2	Silvestras Guogis	Lithuania	51.25	q
24	4	6	Javier Sagredo	Spain	51.37	q
25	1	6	Martin Kučera	Slovakia	51.50	
26	3	8	Jacques Frisch	Luxembourg	51.59	
26	5	7	Oskari Mörö	Finland	51.59	SB
28	3	3	Petteri Monni	Finland	51.73	
29	6	5	Jason Harvey	Ireland	51.83	
30	6	4	Denys Teslenko	Ukraine	51.92	
31	1	8	Attila Nagy	Romania	52.04	
32	4	3	Richard Yates	Great Britain	52.12	
33	1	2	Juan Enrique Valles	Spain	52.43	
34	2	5	Tuncay Örs	Turkey	52.63	
35	4	4	Jussi Heikkilä	Finland	52.95	
36	3	4	Ricardo Lima	Portugal	53.00	
37	5	2	Tibor Koroknai	Hungary	53.22	
	2	2	João Ferreira	Portugal	DNF	
	4	2	Øyvind Kjerpeset	Norway	DNF	
	2	6	Brent LaRue	Slovenia	DQ	
	5	3	José Reynaldo Bencosme de Leon	Italy	DQ	
	6	6	David Gollnow	Germany	DQ	

=== Semifinals ===
First 2 in each heat (Q) and 2 best performers (q) advance to the Semifinals.

Rank	Heat	Lane	Name	Nationality	Time	Note
1	1	8	Emir Bekrić	Serbia	49.37	Q, NR
2	1	4	Georg Fleischhauer	Germany	49.52	Q, SB
3	1	7	Rasmus Mägi	Estonia	49.54	q, NR
4	3	4	Rhys Williams	Great Britain	49.63	Q
5	1	6	Nathan Woodward	Great Britain	49.68	q
6	2	6	Stanislav Melnykov	Ukraine	49.72	Q
7	3	3	Adrien Clémenceau	France	49.80	Q, SB
8	2	5	Periklis Iakovakis	Greece	49.83	Q
9	2	3	Tobias Giehl	Germany	49.95	
10	3	6	Michaël Bultheel	Belgium	49.98	
11	2	7	Mikita Yakauleu	Belarus	50.02	PB
11	3	7	Aleksandr Derevyagin	Russia	50.02	SB
13	1	5	Thomas Barr	Ireland	50.22	SB
14	2	2	Vladimir Antmanis	Russia	50.25	
15	2	4	Václav Barák	Czech Republic	50.33	
16	2	8	Diego Cabello	Spain	50.52	
17	3	5	Jorge Paula	Portugal	50.58	SB
18	1	2	Marek Plawgo	Poland	50.77	
19	3	8	Kariem Hussein	Switzerland	50.81	PB
20	2	1	Silvestras Guogis	Lithuania	51.15	SB
21	3	1	Michal Brož	Czech Republic	51.35	
22	3	2	Javier Sagredo	Spain	51.66	
23	1	1	Spirídon Papadópoulos	Greece	51.89	
	1	3	Josef Prorok	Czech Republic	DQ	

=== Final ===
Rank	Lane	Name	Nationality	Time	Note
1st place, gold medalist(s)	5	Rhys Williams	Great Britain	49.33	SB
2nd place, silver medalist(s)	6	Emir Bekrić	Serbia	49.49	
3rd place, bronze medalist(s)	4	Stanislav Melnykov	Ukraine	49.69	
4	7	Adrien Clémenceau	France	49.70	PB
5	1	Rasmus Mägi	Estonia	50.01	
6	3	Georg Fleischhauer	Germany	50.11	
7	2	Nathan Woodward	Great Britain	50.20	
8	8	Periklis Iakovakis	Greece	50.57	
