= Alica Javadová =

Slovak high jumper

Alica Javadová (born 26 June 1969) is a retired Slovak high jumper.

She finished eighth at the 1996 European Indoor Championships. She also competed at the 1995 World Championships and the 1996 Olympic Games without reaching the final.

Her personal best jump is 1.95 metres, achieved in May 1996 in Bratislava.
