= Jack Green (hurdler) =

British sprint athlete (born 1991)

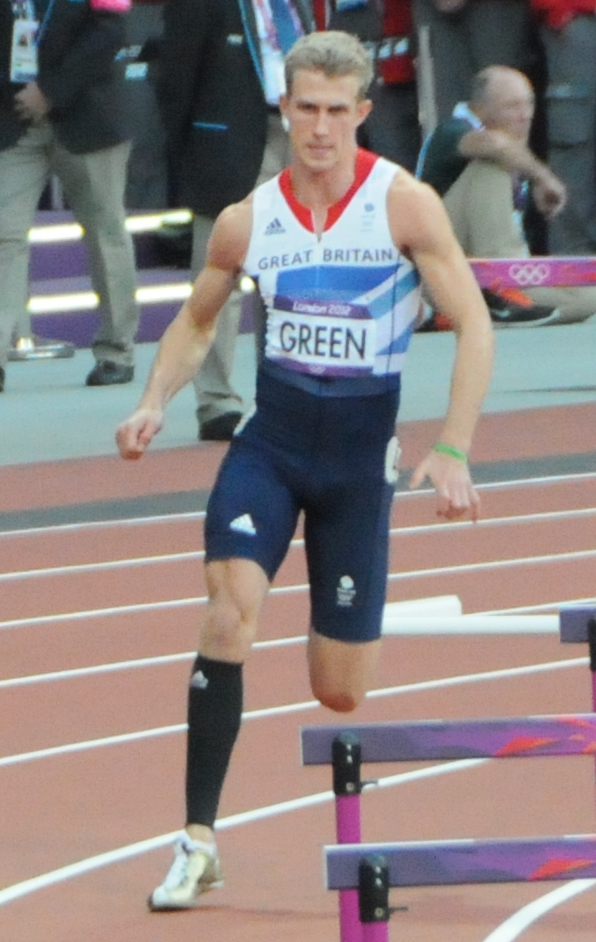
- Jack Green at the 2012 Summer Olympics

Personal information
- Nationality: British (English)
- Born: 6 October 1991 (age 34) Maidstone, England
- Height: 1.93 m (6 ft 4 in)
- Weight: 83 kg (183 lb)

Sport
- Sport: Athletics
- Events: 400m, 400m hurdles and 4x400m relay
- Club: Kent AC

Achievements and titles
- Highest world ranking: UK - 1, EUR - 2, WORLD - 11
- Personal bests: 400m - 45.99s 400m hurdles - 48.60s 4x400m relay - 44.42s
Medal record
Men's athletics
Representing Great Britain
World Championships
Bronze medal – third place	2017 London	4×400 m relay
European Championships
Bronze medal – third place	2016 Amsterdam	4 x 400 m relay

Jack Green (born 6 October 1991) is a retired British sprint athlete who specialised in the 400m distance, along with the hurdles and the 4 × 400 m relay. He competed for the Great Britain team at the 2012 Summer Olympics in London and at the 2016 Summer Olympics in Rio de Janeiro.

== Career ==
Since late 2010, Jack Green has trained with Malcolm Arnold at the University of Bath alongside fellow hurdler Dai Greene. At the 2011 World Championships, he finished fifth in his semi-final, a performance he described as "embarrassing, a waste of my time and the team's money", despite finishing where expected.

He also won a gold medal at the 2011 European U23 Championships in the 400m hurdles.

Following his experience at the previous year's World Championships, Green skipped the European Championships in 2012 to concentrate on the Olympics. In May 2012, he won both the 400m and the 400m hurdles at the BUCS Championships which were held at the Olympic Stadium in London. During 2012, he trialled a new technique which involved taking fewer strides. He first tested the technique at the Bislett Games in Oslo, finishing in sixth place after hitting seven out of ten of the hurdles on the course. After the Bislett Games, he spoke to former hurdler Kriss Akabusi who gave him advice as he suffered from similar issues during his career. Green placed second in the 400m hurdles at the British Olympic Trials, behind his training partner and World Champion, Dai Greene.

At the start of July 2012, Green was named to the athletics squad for the 2012 Summer Olympics, to compete in the 400 metres hurdles and 4x400 relay. Two weeks prior to the games, he ran at a meet at Crystal Palace National Sports Centre, setting a new personal best in both the 400m and the 400m hurdles, at 45.99 seconds and 48.60 seconds. The media coverage of the event noted the fact that Green had written "CHIN DOWN, FLAT BACK" in capital letters on the inside of his left forearm prior to the 400 metre race.

In the 2012 Olympics, Jack Green was eliminated in the semi-finals of the 400 m hurdles, hitting a hurdle and falling. He performed well in the 4 × 400 metres relay, running 44.42s, as Great Britain finished fourth, just 0.13 seconds outside of a medal.

Having suffered from depression throughout 2012, Green announced in 2013 that, despite a full recovery, he was taking a break from the sport to allow his health to improve further, and leaving the British Athletics high-performance funding programme to do so. In August 2014, Green announced his intention to return to the track for the 2015 season and returned to full-time training in Florida. He had to miss the 2015 World Championships due to sciatica, but raced at the 2017 World Championships, where as well as the 400 m hurdles, he ran in the heat of the 4 × 400 m relay. In 2018, he finished 4th at the Commonwealth Games.

Green retired from athletics in November 2019. Since then has worked as head of wellbeing at BBC Studios and founded his own wellbeing consultancy, Olywel; in April 2021 he became head of performance of the workplace wellbeing platform Champion Health.

== Personal life ==
Green attended the University of Bath, where he studied Sports Performance. He had previously attended Brockhill Park Performing Arts College.
