= Matej Baluch =

Slovak athlete

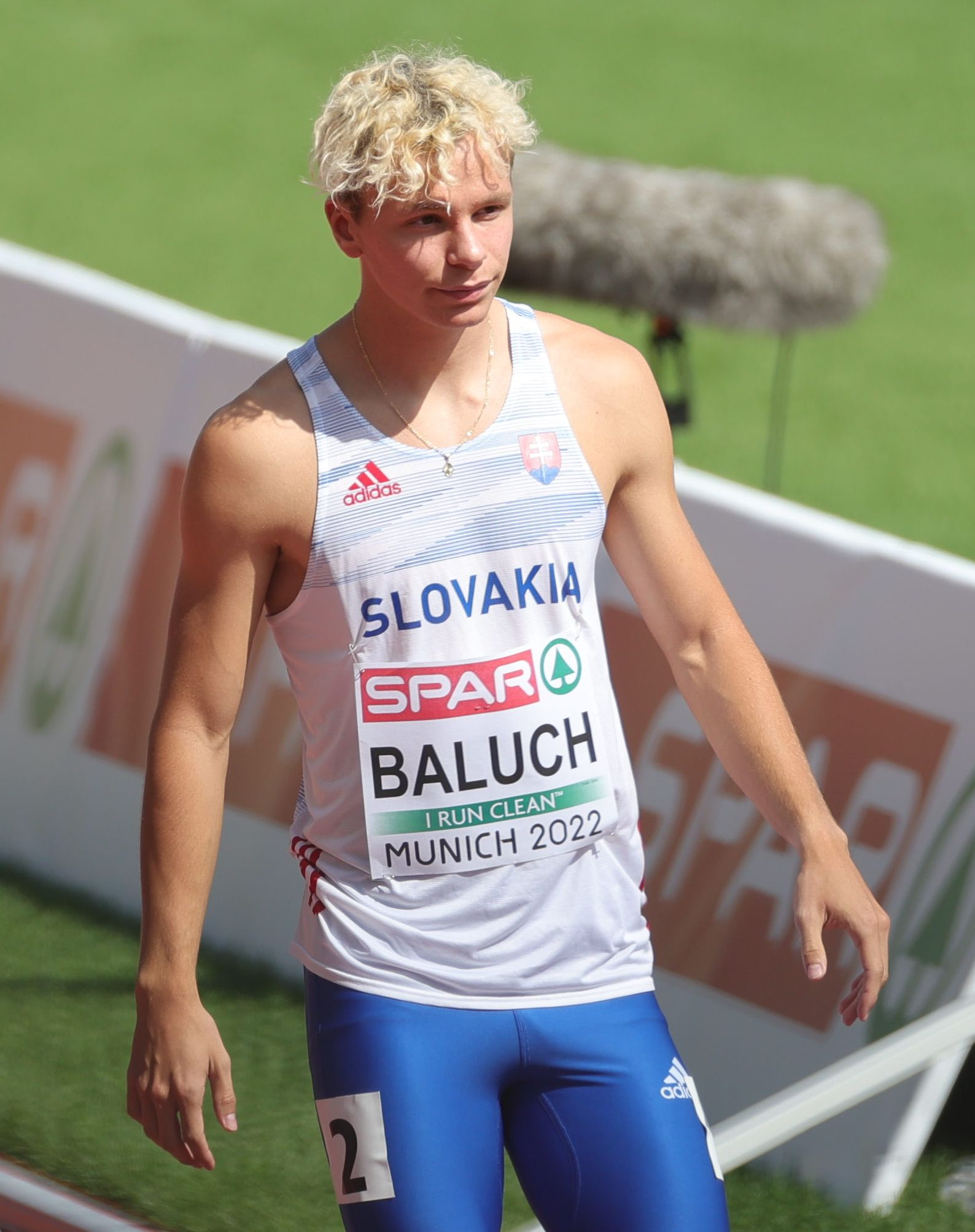
- Baluch in 2022

Personal information
- Born: 14 October 2000 (age 25)

Sport
- Sport: Athletics
- Events: Sprint, hurdles

Achievements and titles
- Personal bests: 200m: 20.93 (2025); 400mH: 48.94 (2026) NR
Medal record
Men's athletics
Representing Slovakia
European Athletics U20 Championships
Bronze medal – third place	2019 Boras	400m hurdles

Matej Baluch (born 16 October 2000) is a Slovak athlete. He has won multiple national championship titles in the 400 metres hurdles and is the joint-national record holder. He is also the national indoor record holder over 200 metres.

== Biography ==
A member of Dukla Banská Bystrica, Baluch won the bronze medal in the 400 metres hurdles at the 2019 European Athletics U20 Championships in Sweden. In 2021, he competed in the 400 m hurdles at the 2021 European Athletics U23 Championships in Tallinn, finishing seventh overall in 51.17 seconds.

As part of the Slovakian 4 x 40 relay team, he helped set a new national indoor record of 3:09.79 at the 2022 World Athletics Indoor Championships in Belgrade. Baluch competed for Slovakia at the 2022 European Athletics Championships in Munich, his debut as an individual at a major championships. In 2022, he improved his personal best in the 400m hurdles) to 50.21 seconds, and achieved a performance under 51 seconds nine times in the season.

Baluch was eliminated in the preliminary round at the 2024 European Athletics Championships in Rome, with a time of 52.17 seconds. In 2025, he improved the Slovakian indoor record in the 200 meters to 20.93 seconds in Ostrava. In March he represented Slovakia at the 2025 World Athletics Indoor Championships in Nanjing, China. In July 2025, Baluch improved his personal record in the 400 m hurdles (49.39) at the ISTAF meeting in Berlin.

At the 2026 Slovakian Indoor Championships he won the 200 metres title for the fourth year in a row, and his sixth title in total. Baluch competed in the 400 metres hurdles for Slovakia at the 2026 European Athletics Championships in Birmingham, where he ran a time of 48.94 seconds, equaling the national record of Jozef Kucej and Patrik Dömötör.

== Personal life ==
He studied at the Matej Bel University.
