= List of Slovak records in athletics =

The following are the national records in athletics in Slovakia maintained by its national athletics federation: Slovak Athletic Federation (SAZ). Of the records from the era of Czechoslovakia, those who represented a Slovak club at the time of the record are included.

== Outdoor ==
Key to tables: Awaiting ratification Record not kept by SAZ Not ratified or later rescinded by SAZ

=== Men ===
Event	Record	Athlete	Date	Meet	Place	Ref.
60 m	6.69 (+0.9 m/s)	Ján Volko	5 June 2020		Ostrava, Czech Republic	
100 y	9.76+ (+0.8 m/s)	Adam Zavacký	27 June 2013	Golden Spike Ostrava	Ostrava, Czech Republic	
100 m	10.13 (+0.3 m/s)	Ján Volko	16 August 2022	European Championships	Munich, Germany	
100 m	10.13 (+1.1 m/s) (Note: not ratified by federation but recognised by World Athletics)	Ján Volko	29 June 2018	PTS Meeting	Šamorín, Slovakia	
150 m	15.33 (−0.8 m/s)	Ján Volko	27 July 2017		Cheb, Czech Republic	
150 m	15.33 (+0.1 m/s)	Ján Volko	5 June 2020		Ostrava, Czech Republic	
200 m	20.24 (+1.6 m/s)	Ján Volko	8 July 2018		Trnava, Slovakia	
400 m	45.32	Štefan Balošák	27 July 1996	Olympic Games	Atlanta, United States	
600 m	1:19.35	Leonard Lendvorský	8 May 2016	26. Internationales Läufermeeting	Pliezhausen, Germany	
800 m	1:44.94	Jozef Repčík	12 June 2008	Golden Spike Ostrava	Ostrava, Czech Republic	
1000 m	2:17.76	Jozef Repčík	17 June 2014	Golden Spike Ostrava	Ostrava, Czech Republic	
1500 m	3:39.41	Jozef Lenčéš	26 June 1977		Athens, Greece	
1500 m	3:39.4 h	Ivan Kovác	30 May 1974		Bratislava, Slovakia	
3000 m	7:46.83	Róbert Štefko	14 June 1997		Sopot, Poland	
5000 m	13:19.40	Róbert Štefko	1 June 1995		Saint Denis, France	
5 km (road)	14:20+	Peter Ďurec	11 January 2026	10K Valencia	Valencia, Spain	
10,000 m	27:42.98	Róbert Štefko	29 June 1997		Lille, France	
10 km (road)	28:28	Peter Ďurec	22 February 2026	10K Facsa Castellón	Castellón de la Plana, Spain	
15 km (road)	43:25	Róbert Štefko	30 April 1995		La Courneuve, France	
20 km (road)	58:38	Róbert Štefko	16 October 1994		Paris, France	
One hour	19836 m	Martin Vrabel	25 September 1980		Ostrava, Czechoslovakia	
Half marathon	1:01:51	Róbert Štefko	3 November 1996		Saint Denis, France	
25 km (road)	1:15:10	Martin Vrabel	7 May 1989	Berlin 25K	West Berlin, West Germany	
Marathon	2:09:53	Róbert Štefko	26 April 1998	London Marathon	London, United Kingdom	
110 m hurdles	13.13	Igor Kováč	7 July 1997	DN Galan	Stockholm, Sweden	
300 m hurdles	35.04	Matej Baluch	18 May 2025	Internationales Läufermeeting	Pliezhausen, Germany	
400 m hurdles	48.94	Jozef Kucej	21 June 1989		Prague, Czechoslovakia	
400 m hurdles	48.94	Patrik Dömötör	8 August 2025	TIPOS P-T-S Meeting	Banská Bystrica, Slovakia	
400 m hurdles	48.94	Matej Baluch	11 August 2026	European Championships	Birmingham, United Kingdom	
3000 m steeplechase	8:32.7 h	Milan Slovák	6 August 1978		Banská Bystrica, Czechoslovakia	
High jump	2.34 m	Róbert Ruffíni	3 July 1988		Prague, Czechoslovakia	
Pole vault	5.41 m	Rudolf Haraksim	23 August 2003		Fribourg, Switzerland	
Long jump	8.05 m	Róbert Széli	6 July 1988		Budapest, Hungary	
Triple jump	17.46 m	Dmitrij Vaľukevič	15 June 2008		Zhukovsky, Russia	
Shot put	20.87 m	Milan Haborák	23 May 2004		Turnov, Czech Republic	
Discus throw	67.20 m	Jaroslav Žitňanský	18 August 2002		Beveren, Belgium	
Hammer throw	81.81 m	Libor Charfreitag	29 June 2003		Prague, Czech Republic	
Javelin throw	87.66 m	Jan Železný	31 May 1987		Nitra, Czechoslovakia	
Decathlon	7799 pts	Peter Sóldos	9–10 June 2001		Arles, France	
Decathlon	100m (wind) / Long jump (wind) / Shot put / High jump / 400m / 110m H (wind) / Discus / Pole vault / Javelin / 1500m; 11.03 / 7.22 m / 15.20 m / 1.90 m / 49.27 / 14.60 / 46.54 m / 4.55 m / 57.73 m / 5:04.01					
Mile walk (track)	5:48.36	Miroslav Úradník	5 June 2022	Janusz Kusociński Memorial	Chorzów, Poland	
10 km walk (road)	38:49	Jozef Pribilinec	3 September 1986		Bad Salzdetfurth, West Germany	
20 km walk (road)	1:18:13	Pavol Blažek	16 September 1990		Hildesheim, West Germany	
30 km walk (road)	2:09:20+	Matej Tóth	21 March 2015	Dudinská Päťdesiatka	Dudince, Slovakia	
35 km walk (road)	2:30:34+	Matej Tóth	21 March 2015	Dudinská Päťdesiatka	Dudince, Slovakia	
50 km walk (road)	3:34:38	Matej Tóth	21 March 2015	Dudinská Päťdesiatka	Dudince, Slovakia	
4 × 100 m relay	39.81	Slovakia; Igor Kováč; Marián Vanderka; Ladislav Noskovič; Martin Briňarský	1 July 2000		Banská Bystrica, Slovakia	
4 × 200 m relay	1:27.17	Slávia TU Košice; Melich; L. Jošák; M. Sedlák; M. Lopuchovký	30 April 1994		Košice, Slovakia	
4 × 400 m relay	3:05.72	Slovakia; Dömötör; Kučera; Murcko; Bujna	21 May 2022		Košice, Slovakia	
4 × 800 m relay	7:32.87	Slovakia; Jozef Repčík; Jozef Pelikán; Dušan Páleník; Tomas Timoransky	24 May 2014	IAAF World Relays	Nassau, Bahamas	

=== Women ===
Event	Record	Athlete	Date	Meet	Place	Ref.
100 y	11.20+ (−0.6 m/s)	Barbora Šimková	27 May 2010	Golden Spike Ostrava	Ostrava, Czech Republic	
100 m	11.19 (+0.6 m/s)	Viktória Forster	17 June 2025	Kritérium SNP	Banská Bystrica, Slovakia	
200 m	22.67 (−0.1 m/s)	Emma Zapletalová	25 July 2026	Slovak Championships	Banská Bystrica, Slovakia	
400 m	50.59	Emma Zapletalová	16 June 2026	Golden Spike Ostrava	Ostrava, Czech Republic	
600 m	1:26.61	Gabriela Gajanová	18 May 2023	Nationales Auffahrts-Meeting	Langenthal, Switzerland	
800 m	1:58.22	Gabriela Gajanová	4 August 2024	Olympic Games	Paris, France	
1000 m	2:36.42	Gabriela Gajanová	25 August 2024	Kamila Skolimoswka Memorial	Chorzów, Poland	
1000 m	2:35.55	Gabriela Gajanová	24 August 2026	Folksam Grand Prix	Göteborg, Sweden	
1500 m	4:02.99	Lucia Klocová	8 August 2012	Olympic Games	London, United Kingdom	
3000 m	8:56.49	Jana Kučeríková	8 July 1986		Cork, Ireland	
5000 m	15:43.67	Alena Močáriová	21 June 1988		Grudziądz, Poland	
5 km (road)	16:09	Alena Močáriová	9 June 1991		Bern, Switzerland	
10,000 m	32:47.24	Ľudmila Melicherová	30 August 1986	European Championships	Stuttgart, West Germany	
10 km (road)	33:30	Dana Janečková	3 November 2001		Frýdek-Místek, Czech Republic	
15 km (road)	52:58	Alena Močáriová	4 June 2000		Ratekau, Germany	
One hour	16154 m	Katarína Berešová	12 June 2008	Golden Spike Ostrava	Ostrava, Czech Republic	
Half marathon	1:12:08	Mária Starovská	5 April 1992	Berlin Half Marathon	Berlin, Germany	
25 km (road)	1:27:00	Ludmila Melicherová	May 1988	Berlin 25K	West Berlin, West Germany	
Marathon	2:33:19	Ľudmila Melicherová	22 April 1990	Vienna City Marathon	Vienna, Austria	
100 m hurdles	12.63 (+1.4 m/s)	Viktória Forster	8 August 2025	P-T-S Meeting	Banská Bystrica, Slovakia	
300 m hurdles	38.97	Emma Zapletalová	8 September 2020	Golden Spike Ostrava	Ostrava, Czech Republic	
400 m hurdles	52.30	Emma Zapletalová	19 June 2026	Doha Diamond League	Doha, Qatar	
3000 m steeplechase	9:57.11	Anna Švrček	27 September 2025	Japanese U20 Championships	Shizuoka, Japan	
High jump	1.95 m	Alica Javadová	29 May 1996		Bratislava, Slovakia	
Pole vault	4.10 m	Slavomíra Sľúková	12 July 2006		Novo Mesto, Slovenia	
Pole vault	4.10 m	Slavomíra Sľúková	30 June 2007		Dubnica nad Váhom, Slovakia	
Pole vault	4.10 m	Slavomíra Sľúková	27 May 2012	ECCC Track and Field Seniors Group B	Dubnica nad Váhom, Slovakia	
Long jump	7.01 m (−0.2 m/s)	Eva Murková	26 May 1984		Bratislava, Czechoslovakia	
Triple jump	14.51 m (+1.3 m/s)	Dana Velďáková	11 May 2008		Pavia, Italy	
Shot put	16.96 m	Gabriela Hanuláková	14 July 1985		Bratislava, Czechoslovakia	
Discus throw	64.00 m	Gabriela Hanuláková	26 August 1984		Nitra, Czechoslovakia	
Hammer throw	76.90 m	Martina Hrašnová	16 May 2009		Trnava, Slovakia	
Javelin throw	53.25 m	Petra Hanuliaková	21 July 2026	P-T-S Meeting	Banská Bystrica, Slovakia	
Heptathlon	6103 pts	Lucia Slanicková	17–18 June 2017	TNT – Fortuna Meeting	Kladno, Czech Republic	
Heptathlon	100m H (wind) / High jump / Shot put / 200m (wind) / Long jump (wind) / Javelin / 800m; 13.97 (+1.3 m/s) / 1.77 m / 11.08 m / 24.30 (+2.3 m/s) / 6.31 m (+1.6 m/s) / 43.81 m / 2:11.71					
Mile walk	7:30.36	Timea Indrišková	1 July 2026	Raiffeisen Austrian Open	Eisenstadt, Austria	
10 km walk (road)	45:20+	Mária Gáliková	9 April 2016	Poděbrady Walking Race	Poděbrady, Czech Republic	
15 km walk (road)	1:08:00+	Mária Gáliková	9 April 2016	Poděbrady Walking Race	Poděbrady, Czech Republic	
20,000 m walk (track)	1:36:39.1	Mária Gáliková	14 June 2009		Banská Bystrica, Slovakia	
20 km walk (road)	1:30:53	Mária Gáliková	9 April 2016	Poděbrady Walking Race	Poděbrady, Czech Republic	
35 km walk (road)	2:57:36	Mária Katerinka Czaková	23 March 2019		Dudince, Slovakia	
50 km walk (road)	4:14:25	Mária Czaková	24 March 2018	Dudinská Päťdesiatka	Dudince, Slovakia	
4 × 100 m relay	44.65	Slovakia; Vladimíra Šibová; Lenka Kršáková; Iveta Putalová; Alexandra Bezeková	4 June 2016	51st Pravda-Televízia-Slovnaft Meeting	Šamorín, Slovakia	
4 × 400 m relay	3:31.66	Slovakia; Silvia Šalgovičová; Alexandra Štuková; Alexandra Bezeková; Iveta Putalová	9 July 2016	European Championships	Amsterdam, Netherlands	
4 × 400 m relay	3:27.02	Slovakia; Viktória Korbová; Emma Zapletalová; Gabriela Gajanová; Daniela Ledecká	16 August 2026	European Championships	Birmingham, United Kingdom	

=== Mixed ===
Event	Record	Athlete	Date	Meet	Place	Ref.
4 × 100 m relay	42.46	Slovakia; Matej Baluch; Viktória Strýcková; Šimon Bujna; Delia Farajpour	22 August 2025	Memorial Van Damme	Brussels, Belgium	
4 × 400 m relay	3:14.05	Slovakia; Patrik Dömötör; Daniela Ledecká; Matej Baluch; Emma Zapletalová	29 June 2025	European Team Championships	Maribor, Slovenia	

== Indoor ==
=== Men ===
Event	Record	Athlete	Date	Meet	Place	Ref.
50 m	5.79+	Ján Volko	4 February 2025	Czech Indoor Gala	Ostrava, Czech Republic	
60 m	6.55	Ján Volko	21 February 2020	Villa de Madrid Indoor Meeting	Madrid, Spain	
200 m	20.93	Matej Baluch	21 February 2025	Slovak Championships	Ostrava, Czech Republic	
400 m	46.61	Patrik Dömötör	15 February 2025	The Keely Klassic	Birmingham, United Kingdom	
500 m	1:04.07	Denis Danáč	25 February 2014	Prague Indoor	Prague, Czech Republic	
800 m	1:47.06	Jozef Repčík	16 February 2008	AVIVA Indoor Grand Prix	Birmingham, United Kingdom	
1500 m	3:42.5 h	Jozef Lencés	2 March 1977		Bratislava, Czechoslovakia	
3000 m	7:54.59	Miroslav Vanko	17 February 2000	GE Galan	Stockholm, Sweden	
5000 m	13:54.39	Miroslav Vanko	14 February 1999	Aviva Indoor Grand Prix	Birmingham, United Kingdom	
60 m hurdles	7.55	Igor Kováč	20 February 1999		Prague, Czech Republic	
High jump	2.32 m	Róbert Ruffíni	26 February 1988		West Berlin, West Germany	
High jump	2.32 m	Róbert Ruffíni	7 March 1990		Piraeus, Greece	
Pole vault	5.32 m	Jan Zmoray	16 January 2016		Vienna, Austria	
Long jump	7.80 m	Jaroslav Dobrovodský	20 February 2011	Slovak Championships	Bratislava, Slovakia	
Triple jump	17.19 m	Dmitrij Valukevic	29 January 2006		Bratislava, Slovakia	
Shot put	21.57 m (Note: outdoor mark ratified as absolute record)	Mikuláš Konopka	2 March 2007	European Championships	Birmingham, United Kingdom	
Weight throw	25.68 m	Libor Charfreitag	5 March 2005		Sterling, United States	
Heptathlon	5712 pts	Slaven Dizdarević	7-8 February 2009		Prague, Czech Republic	
Heptathlon	60m / Long jump / Shot put / High jump / 60m H / Pole vault / 1000m; 7.00 / 7.12 m / 14.86 m / 1.93 m / 7.94 / 4.40 m / 2:52.58					
3000 m walk	10:57.32	Matej Toth	12 February 2011	ASVÖ Vienna Indoor Gala	Vienna, Austria	
5000 m walk	18:27.80	Jozef Pribilinec	7 March 1987	World Championships	Indianapolis, United States	
4 × 200 m relay	1:27.52	Naša atletika Federič; Košík; Benda; Ján Volko	26 February 2022		Bratislava, Slovakia	
4 × 400 m relay	3:09.21	Slovakia; Mário Hanic; Šimon Bujna; Patrik Dömötör; Miroslav Marček	3 March 2024	World Championships	Glasgow, United Kingdom	

=== Women ===
Event	Record	Athlete	Date	Meet	Place	Ref.
50 m	6.28+	Viktória Forster	4 February 2025	Czech Indoor Gala	Ostrava, Czech Republic	
60 m	7.21	Eva Murková	9 February 1985		Jablonec, Czechoslovakia	
200 m	23.47	Lucia Ivanová	14 March 2003	World Championships	Birmingham, United Kingdom	
300 m	37.70	Alexandra Bezeková	25 January 2018	Czech Indoor Gala	Ostrava, Czech Republic	
400 m	52.61	Emma Zapletalová	25 January 2025	Regional Championships	Ostrava, Czech Republic	
400 m	51.24	Emma Zapletalová	3 February 2026	Czech Indoor Gala	Ostrava, Czech Republic	
400 m	50.78	Emma Zapletalová	8 February 2026	Meeting Metz Moselle Athlélor Crédit Mutuel	Metz, France	
600 m	1:25.83	Gabriela Gajanová	31 January 2026	Biel Hallenmeeting	Magglingen, Switzerland	
800 m	2:01.70	Gabriela Gajanová	4 March 2023	European Championships	Istanbul, Turkey	
800 m	2:00.45	Gabriela Gajanová	3 February 2026	Czech Indoor Gala	Ostrava, Czech Republic	
1000 m	2:39.74	Lucia Klocová	16 February 2003		Bratislava, Slovakia	
1500 m	4:19.49	Andrea Sollárová	1 February 1992		Vienna, Austria	
1500 m	4:16.2 h Mx	Andrea Sollárová	February 1992		Bratislava, Czechoslovakia	
3000 m	9:19.17	Ludmila Melicherová	3 March 1985	European Championships	Piraeus, Greece	
3000 m	9:15.66 OT	Ludmila Melicherová	7 February 1987		Jablonec, Czechoslovakia	
5000 m	16:52.60	Silvia Pajanová	22 February 1984		Bratislava, Czechoslovakia	
60 m hurdles	8.01	Viktória Forster	12 February 2025	Memorijal Josip Gašparac	Osijek, Croatia	
High jump	1.96 m (Note: outdoor mark ratified as absolute record)	Mária Melová	12 February 1997		Banská Bystrica, Slovakia	
High jump	1.96 m	Mária Melová	27 February 1999		Otterberg, Germany	
Pole vault	4.12 m (Note: outdoor mark ratified as absolute record)	Slavomira Slúková	2 February 2008		Budapest, Hungary	
Long jump	6.99 m	Eva Murková	2 March 1985	European Championships	Piraeus, Greece	
Triple jump	14.40 m	Dana Velďáková	8 March 2009	European Championships	Turin, Italy	
Shot put	15.79 m	Gabriela Hanuláková	22 February 1984		Bratislava, Czechoslovakia	
Pentathlon	4488 pts	Lucia Slaničková	18 January 2020		Ostrava, Czech Republic	
Pentathlon	60m H / High jump / Shot put / Long jump / 800m; 8.54 / 1.81 m / 11.32 m / 6.44 m / 2:15.56					
3000 m walk	12:34.31	Zuzana Zemková	5 February 1993		Budapest, Hungary	
4 × 200 m relay	1:39.44	Slávia UK Bratislava; Polyaková; Weigertová; Štuková; Iveta Putalová	12 February 2015		Bratislava, Slovakia	
4 × 400 m relay	4:01.07	Spartak Dubnica; Veronika Veselá; Dominika Bodnárová; Andrea Holleyová; Lucia Slaničková	25 February 2007		Bratislava, Slovakia	
4 × 400 m relay	3:29.87	Slovakia; Daniela Ledecká; Viktória Korbová; Martina Segečová; Emma Zapletalová	22 March 2026	World Championships	Toruń, Poland	
