= Anton Kučmín =

Slovak racewalker

Anton Kučmín (born 6 July 1984 in Ilava) is a Slovak racewalker. He competed in the 20 km walk at the 2012 Summer Olympics, where he placed 23rd.

Kučmín competed representing the VŠC Dukla Banská Bystrica club. He is coached by Juraj Benčík.

== Competition record ==
Year	Competition	Venue	Position	Event	Notes
Representing Slovakia
2003	European Junior Championships	Tampere, Finland	11th	10,000 m walk	44:43.31
2004	World Race Walking Cup	Naumburg, Germany	84th	20 km walk	1:32:49
2005	European Race Walking Cup	Miskolc, Hungary	27th	20 km walk	1:30:48
2007	European Race Walking Cup	Royal Leamington Spa, United Kingdom	21st	50 km walk	3:57:41
2007	World Championships	Osaka, Japan	–	50 km walk	DNF
2009	European Race Walking Cup	Metz, France	23rd	20 km walk	1:33:55
2010	World Race Walking Cup	Chihuahua, Mexico	36th	20 km walk	1:28:28
2010	European Championships	Barcelona, Spain	16th	20 km walk	1:25:12
2011	European Race Walking Cup	Olhão, Portugal	15th	20 km walk	1:28:14
2011	World Championships	Daegu, South Korea	18th	20 km walk	1:23:57
2012	Olympic Games	London, United Kingdom	23rd	20 km walk	1:22:25
2013	European Race Walking Cup	Dudince, Slovakia	–	20 km walk	DNF
2013	World Championships	Moscow, Russia	21st	20 km walk	1:22:12
2014	World Race Walking Cup	Taicang, China	35th	20 km walk	1:22:12
2014	European Championships	Zürich, Switzerland	20th	20 km walk	1:25:07
2015	European Race Walking Cup	Murcia, Spain	28th	20 km	1:26:53
2015	European Race Walking Cup	Murcia, Spain	6th	20 km - Team	68 pts
2015	World Championships	Beijing, China	44th	20 km walk	1:27:46
