= Martin Kučera =

Slovak hurdler (born 1990)

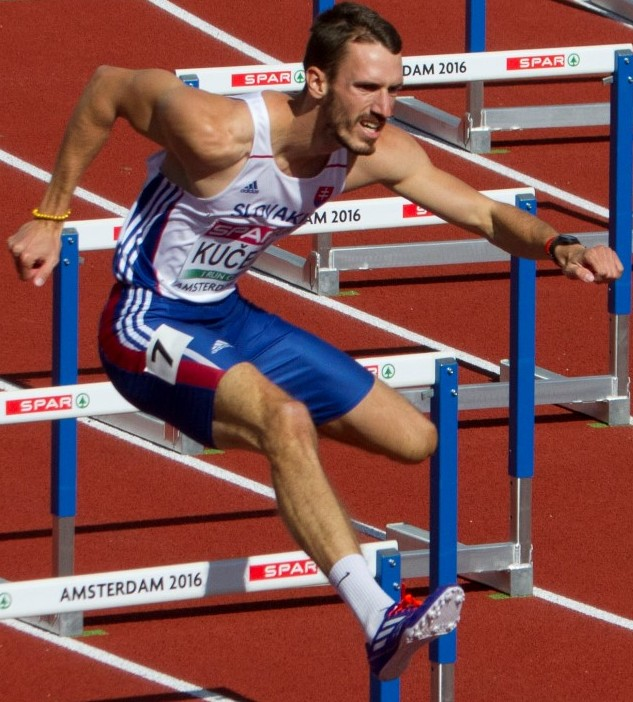
- Kučera in 2016

Personal information
- Born: 10 May 1990 (age 36) Bratislava, Czechoslovakia
- Education: Comenius University
- Height: 1.93 m (6 ft 4 in)
- Weight: 74 kg (163 lb)

Sport
- Sport: Athletics
- Event: 400 metres hurdles
- Coached by: Vladimír Bezdíček
Medal record
Men's athletics
Representing Slovakia
European Games
Gold medal – first place	2015 Baku	Mixed team
Universiade
Gold medal – first place	2013 Kazan	400 metres hurdles

Martin Kučera (born 10 May 1990 in Bratislava) is a Slovak athlete specialising in the 400 metres hurdles. He won the gold medal at the 2013 Summer Universiade.

His personal best in the event is 49.08 seconds set in Amsterdam in 2016.

== International competitions ==
Year	Competition	Venue	Position	Event	Notes
Representing Slovakia
2012	European Championships	Helsinki, Finland	25th (h)	400 m hurdles	51.50
2013	Universiade	Kazan, Russia	1st	400 m hurdles	49.79
2016	European Championships	Amsterdam, Netherlands	7th	400 m hurdles	49.82
2016	Olympic Games	Rio de Janeiro, Brazil	44th (h)	400 m hurdles	51.47
2018	European Championships	Berlin, Germany	18th (sf)	400 m hurdles	50.30
2021	European Indoor Championships	Toruń, Poland	45th (h)	400 m	48.44
2022	European Championships	Munich, Germany	18th (h)	400 m hurdles	50.82
2022	European Championships	Munich, Germany	15th (h)	4 × 400 m relay	3:06.98
