= Slovak Athletic Federation =

Governing body for athletics in Slovakia

- Slovenský atletický zväz
- Sport: Athletics
- Abbreviation: SAZ
- Founded: 1939
- Affiliation: World Athletics
- Regional affiliation: EAA
- Headquarters: Bratislava, Slovakia
- President: Peter Korčok
- Secretary: Vladimír Gubrický
- Coach: Martin Pupiš

Official website
- www.atletika.sk
- (Slovakia)

The Slovak Athletic Federation (Slovak: Slovenský atletický zväz) is the governing body for the sport of athletics in Slovakia.

== Affiliations ==
- World Athletics
- European Athletic Association (EAA)
- Slovak Olympic Committee

== National records ==
SAZ maintains the Slovak records in athletics.
