= Hana Burzalová =

Slovak racewalker (born 2000)

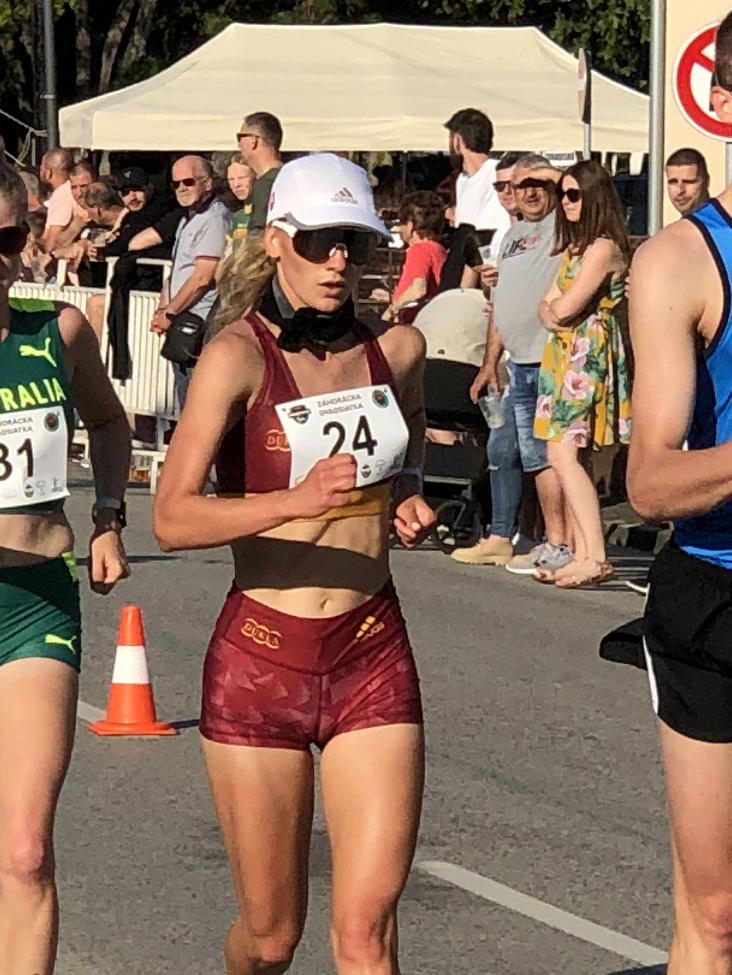
- Burzalová in 2023

Personal information
- Nationality: Slovak
- Born: 3 November 2000 (age 25) Ilava, Slovakia
- Height: 165 cm (5 ft 5 in)
- Weight: 47 kg (104 lb)

Sport
- Sport: Athletics
- Event: Racewalking

Hana Burzalová (born 3 November 2000) is a Slovak race walker. She represented Slovakia at the 2024 Summer Olympics in Paris, taking part in the women's 20 kilometres walk and mixed marathon walk relay.

== Biography ==
Hana Burzalová was born on 3 November 2000 in Ilava. She started competing internationally in 2015.

Her biggest career success has been the 23rd place in the 35 kilometres race walk event at the 2022 World Athletics Championships in Eugene, Oregon. During the event she set her personal best at the 35 kilometre distance, with a time of 2 hours, 39 minutes and 32 seconds. The following month, Burzalová recorded a season's best time in the 20 kilometre walk at the 2022 European Athletics Championships, finishing in 18th place with a time of 1 hour, 40 minutes and 31 seconds.

Her engagement to her fellow athlete Dominik Černý who proposed at the finish line of the 35 kilometer race at the 2023 World Athletics Championships in Budapest attracted worldwide media attention.

She was the runner up in the Slovakia's racewalker of the year award by the Slovak Athletic Federation in 2023, won by Černý.

Burzalová qualified for the 2024 Summer Olympics after finishing in 21st place at the 2024 World Athletics Race Walking Team Championships in Antalya together with her partner Černý. In Paris, Burzalová finished 37th in the women's 20 kilometres walk with a time over 3 minutes slower than her personal best. In her second event of the Games, Burzalová teamed up with Černý to finish the mixed marathon walk relay in a national record time of 3 hours, 3 minutes and 54 seconds, finishing 18th overall.
