= Patrik Dömötör =

Slovak athlete

Personal information
- Born: 13 December 2000 (age 25)

Sport
- Sport: Athletics
- Events: Sprint, hurdles

Achievements and titles
- Personal bests: 400m 46.61 (2025); 400m hurdles 48.94 (2025) NR
Medal record
Men's athletics
Representing Slovakia
Summer World University Games
Bronze medal – third place	2025 Bochum	400m hurdles

Patrik Dömötör (born 13 December 2000) is a Slovak athlete. He has won multiple national championship titles in the 400 metres hurdles and is the joint national record holder. He is also the national indoor record holder over 400 metres.

== Biography ==
Running as a member of TJ Olympia Galanta, he won his first senior Slovak championship title in the 400 metres at the Slovak Indoor Championships in Bratislava, running a new personal record of 48.49 seconds in February 2019. At the 2021 World Athletics Relays in Chorzów, Poland, he finished sixth overall in the 2 x 2 x 400 m relay with Daniela Ledecká.

He competed in the 400 metres relay at the 2024 World Athletics Indoor Championships in Glasgow, Scotland. He competed for Slovakia at the 2024 European Athletics Championships in Rome, Italy but did not progress through the preliminary heats.

In February 2025, running for Slávia STU Bratislava he set a Slovak national indoor record over 400 metres at the Czech Indoor Gala in Ostrava. That month, he also won the 400m race at the Keely Klassic in Birmingham, England and improved his own record by two hundredths of a second with a time of 46.61 seconds. He ran the 400 metres at the 2025 World Athletics Indoor Championships in Nanjing, China but did not qualify from his heat.

He won the 400 metres hurdles race at the 2025 European Athletics Team Championships Second Division event in Maribor, Slovenia in June 2025. The following month, he won the bronze medal at the 2025 World University Games in Germany, running the second best time of his career 49.45 seconds. On 2 August, he lowered his personal best to 49.23 seconds and set a championship record in winning the Slovak Athletics Championships. The following week, whilst competing in Štiavničky he ran a time of 48.94 seconds, equaling the 36-year-old national record of Jozef Kucej. He placed seventh in the 400 metres hurdles at the 2025 Athletissima in wet conditions in Lausanne.

He competed at the 2025 World Athletics Championships in the men's 400 metres hurdles in Tokyo, Japan, in September 2025, without advancing to the semi-finals.
