= Dominik Černý =

Slovak racewalker (born 1997)

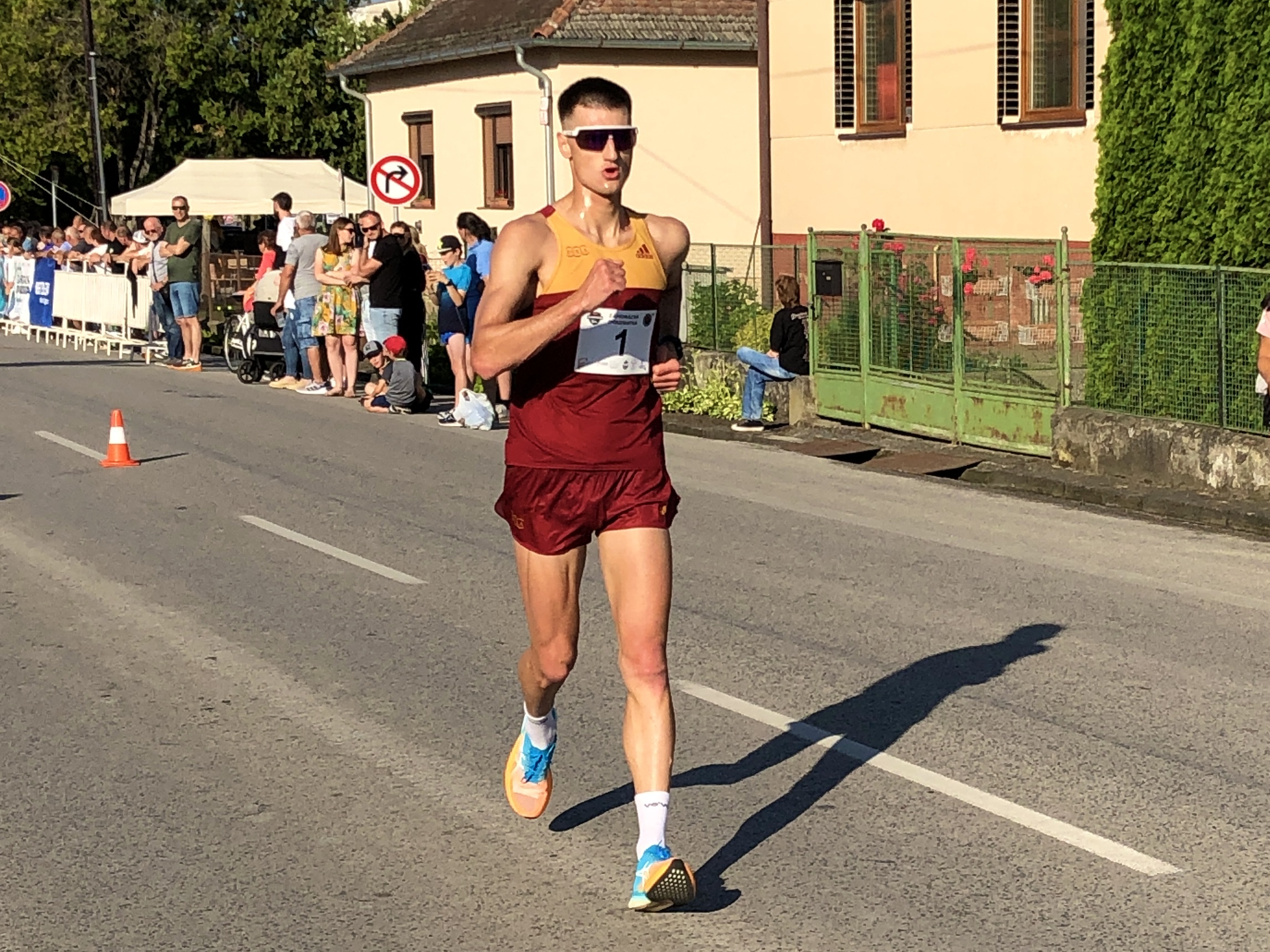
- Černý in 2023

Personal information
- Nationality: Slovak
- Born: 1 November 1997 (age 28) Nové Mesto nad Váhom, Slovakia

Sport
- Sport: Athletics
- Event: Racewalking

Dominik Černý (born 1 November 1997) is a Slovak race walker.

== Biography ==
Dominik Černý was born 1 November 1997 in Nové Mesto nad Váhom.

His engagement to his fellow athlete Hana Burzalová whom he proposed at the finish line of the 35 kilometer race at the 2023 World Athletics Championships in Budapest attracted worldwide media attention.

Černý qualified for the 2024 Summer Olympics at the 2024 World Athletics Race Walking Team Championships in Antalya together with his partner Burzalová.

He was named the Slovakia's racewalker of the year by the Slovak Athletic Federation in 2023.
