= Daniela Ledecká =

Slovak athlete

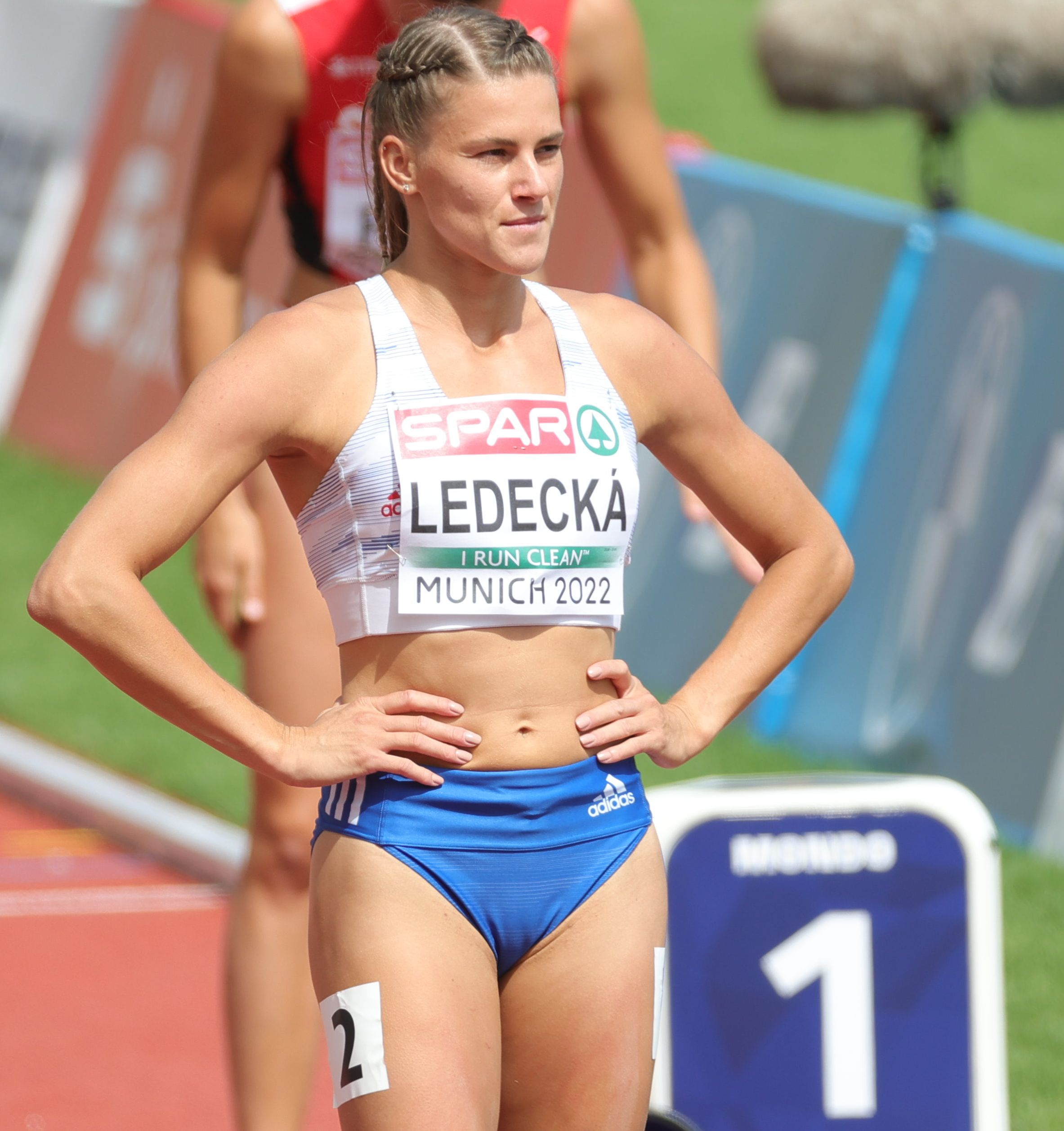
- Ledecká in 2022

Personal information
- Born: 4 November 1996 (age 29)

Sport
- Sport: Athletics
- Events: Sprint, Hurdles

Achievements and titles
- Personal bests: 400m 52.71 (2025); 400m hurdles 54.69 (2025)

Daniela Ledecká (born 4 November 1996) is a Slovak athlete. She has won multiple national championship titles in the 400 metres hurdles. She competed in the 400 metres at the 2025 World Athletics Indoor Championships.

== Biography ==
Ledecká competes as a member of VŠC Dukla Banská Bystrica. She ran in the Slovak 4 x 400 metres relay team at the 2018 European Athletics Championships, in which they placed eighth overall. She also competed in the 400 metres hurdles at the championships, held in Berlin. In June 2019, she set a new personal best for the 400 m hurdles in Šamorín with a time of 56.79 seconds for the 400 metres hurdles.

At the 2021 World Athletics Relays in Chorzów, Poland, she finished sixth in the 2 x 2 x 400 m relay with Patrik Dömötör.

She ran at the 2022 World Athletics Championships in Eugene, Oregon, where she became the first Slovak women to compete in the 400 metres hurdles at the world championships. Later that summer she competed at the 2022 European Athletics Championships in Germany. In August 2023, she finished fourth at the delayed 2021 World University Games in Chengdu, finishing in 56.71 seconds.

She reached the semi-finals competing for Slovakia at the 2024 European Athletics Championships in Rome, Italy in June 2024.

She was a semi-finalist in the 400 metres at the 2025 World Athletics Indoor Championships in Nanjing, China, finishing with the tenth fastest time of 53.39 seconds. She took part in the 2025 Diamond League at the 2025 London Athletics Meet in July 2025.

She was a semi-finalist in the women's 400 metres hurdles at the 2025 World Athletics Championships in Tokyo, Japan, in September 2025.

She was selected for the 2026 World Athletics Indoor Championships in Poland, running the 400 metres without advancing to the semi-finals.

Competing at the 2026 European Athletics Championships in Birmingham, England, she was a semi-finalist in the 400 metres hurdles. She also competed in the women's 4 × 400 metres relay at the championships.

== Personal life ==
In 2023, she appeared on Slovak television quiz show Riskuj! alongside her national teammate and friend Viktória Forster.
