= Mária Czaková =

Slovak racewalker

Personal information
- Full name: Mária Katerinka Czaková
- Born: 2 October 1988 (age 37) Nitra, Czechoslovakia
- Height: 166 cm (5 ft 5 in)

Sport
- Country: Slovakia
- Sport: Athletics
- Event: Racewalking
Medal record
European Cup
Bronze medal – third place	2009 Metz	20 km team

Mária Katerinka Czaková (born 2 October 1988 in Nitra) is a Slovak race walker. She competed in the 20 km kilometres event at the 2012 and 2016 Summer Olympics. She also represented Slovakia at four World Championships (2011, 2013, 2015 and 2017). In 2019, she competed in the women's 50 kilometres walk at the 2019 World Athletics Championships held in Doha, Qatar. She did not finish her race.

She also competed at the 2020 Summer Olympics in Tokio and she qualified for the 2024 Summer Olympics in Paris.
