= 2010 World Junior Championships in Athletics – Women's 400 metres hurdles =

The women's 400 metres hurdles event at the 2010 World Junior Championships in Athletics was held in Moncton, New Brunswick, Canada, at Moncton Stadium on 22 and 24 July.

== Medalists ==
Gold	Vera Rudakova; Russia
Silver	Evonne Britton; United States
Bronze	Shiori Miki; Japan

== Results ==
=== Final ===
24 July

Rank	Name	Nationality	Time	Notes
1st place, gold medalist(s)	Vera Rudakova	Russia	57.16	
2nd place, silver medalist(s)	Evonne Britton	United States	57.32	
3rd place, bronze medalist(s)	Shiori Miki	Japan	57.35	
4	Lisa Hofmann	Germany	57.74	
5	Ristananna Tracey	Jamaica	57.77	
6	Kelsey Balkwill	Canada	57.94	
7	Cristina Holland	United States	60.12	
	Katsiaryna Artyukh	Belarus	DQ	IAAF rule 32.2

=== Heats ===
22 July

==== Heat 1 ====
Rank	Name	Nationality	Time	Notes
1	Ristananna Tracey	Jamaica	58.61	Q
2	Lisa Hofmann	Germany	59.18	q
3	Ashlea Maddex	Canada	60.41	
4	Svetlana Zagorodneva	Kazakhstan	60.44	
5	Sanda Belgyan	Romania	61.75	
	Eva Jeníková	Czech Republic	DQ	IAAF rule 162.7
	Katsiaryna Artyukh	Belarus	DQ	IAAF rule 32.2 Q

==== Heat 2 ====
Rank	Name	Nationality	Time	Notes
1	Vera Rudakova	Russia	58.52	Q
2	Evonne Britton	United States	59.62	Q
3	Gabriela Cumberbatch	Trinidad and Tobago	59.86	
4	Déborah Rodríguez	Uruguay	60.39	
5	Jean-Marie Senekal	South Africa	60.53	
6	Miel Ayedou	Benin	61.15	
7	Ewa Marcinkiewicz	Sweden	61.41	
8	Thiru Piriyah	Singapore	66.08	

==== Heat 3 ====
Rank	Name	Nationality	Time	Notes
1	Shiori Miki	Japan	58.45	Q
2	Kelsey Balkwill	Canada	59.04	Q
3	Cristina Holland	United States	59.11	q
4	Danielle Dowie	Jamaica	59.28	
5	Christine McMahon	Ireland	60.19	
6	Giulia Latini	Italy	60.20	
7	Abir Barkaoui	Tunisia	64.58	

== Participation ==
According to an unofficial count, 22 athletes from 19 countries participated in the event.

- Belarus (1)
- Benin (1)
- Canada (2)
- Czech Republic (1)
- Germany (1)
- Ireland (1)
- Italy (1)
- Jamaica (2)
- Japan (1)
- Kazakhstan (1)
- Romania (1)
- Russia (1)
- Singapore (1)
- South Africa (1)
- Sweden (1)
- Trinidad and Tobago (1)
- Tunisia (1)
- United States (2)
- Uruguay (1)
