= 2016 European Athletics Championships – Women's 400 metres hurdles =

Women's 400 metres hurdles at the European Athletics Championships
- Venue: Olympic Stadium
- Location: Amsterdam
- Dates: 8 July (round 1); 9 July (semifinals); 10 July (final)
- Competitors: 32 from 23 nations
- Winning time: 55.12 s

Medalists
gold medal	Sara Slott Petersen	Denmark
silver medal	Joanna Linkiewicz	Poland
bronze medal	Léa Sprunger	Switzerland

The women's 400 metres hurdles at the 2016 European Athletics Championships took place at the Olympic Stadium on 8, 9 and 10 July.

== Records ==
Standing records prior to the 2016 European Athletics Championships
World record	Yuliya Pechenkina (RUS)	52.34	Tula, Russia	8 August 2003
European record	Yuliya Pechenkina (RUS)	52.34	Tula, Russia	8 August 2003
Championship record	Natalya Antyukh (RUS)	52.92	Barcelona, Spain	30 July 2010
World Leading	Shamier Little (USA)	53.51	Eugene, United States	11 June 2016
European Leading	Eilidh Doyle (GBR)	54.53	Doha, Qatar	6 May 2016

== Schedule ==
Date	Time	Round
8 July 2016	14:15	Round 1
9 July 2016	20:20	Semifinals
10 July 2016	17:05	Final

All times are local times (UTC+2)

== Results ==
=== Round 1 ===
First 2 in each heat (Q) and the next fastest 6 (q) advance to the Semifinals.

Rank	Heat	Lane	Name	Nationality	Time	Note
1	3	6	Stina Troest	Denmark	56.32	Q, SB
2	4	7	Emilia Ankiewicz	Poland	56.43	Q, PB
3	3	2	Aurélie Chaboudez	France	56.69	Q
4	2	6	Bianca Baak	Netherlands	56.88	Q
5	4	3	Phara Anarchasis	France	56.95	Q
6	1	4	Amalie Hammild Iuel	Norway	56.98	Q
7	2	5	Arna Stefanía Gudmundsdóttir	Iceland	57.14	Q, PB
8	1	2	Līga Velvere	Latvia	57.38	Q
9	2	7	Nenah de Coninck	Belgium	57.45	q
10	2	4	Petra Fontanive	Switzerland	57.49	q
11	4	8	Lucia Slaničková	Slovakia	57.55	q
12	3	4	Hilla Uusimäki	Finland	57.59	q, PB
13	4	6	Christine McMahon	Ireland	57.73	q
14	1	3	Vera Barbosa	Portugal	57.84	q
15	1	6	Robine Schürmann	Switzerland	57.91	SB
16	3	3	Tereza Vokálová	Czech Republic	57.97	
17	3	5	Jackie Baumann	Germany	58.17	
18	3	7	Frida Persson	Sweden	58.26	
19	1	7	Maëva Contion	France	58.31	
20	4	4	Elif Yıldırım	Turkey	58.40	
21	1	5	Alena Hrusoci	Croatia	58.98	
22	2	2	Tina Matusińska	Poland	59.22	
23	2	3	Anniina Laitinen	Finland	1:01.56	
24	4	2	Drita Islami	Macedonia	1:02.36	
	4	5	Vania Stambolova	Bulgaria	DQ	

=== Semifinals ===
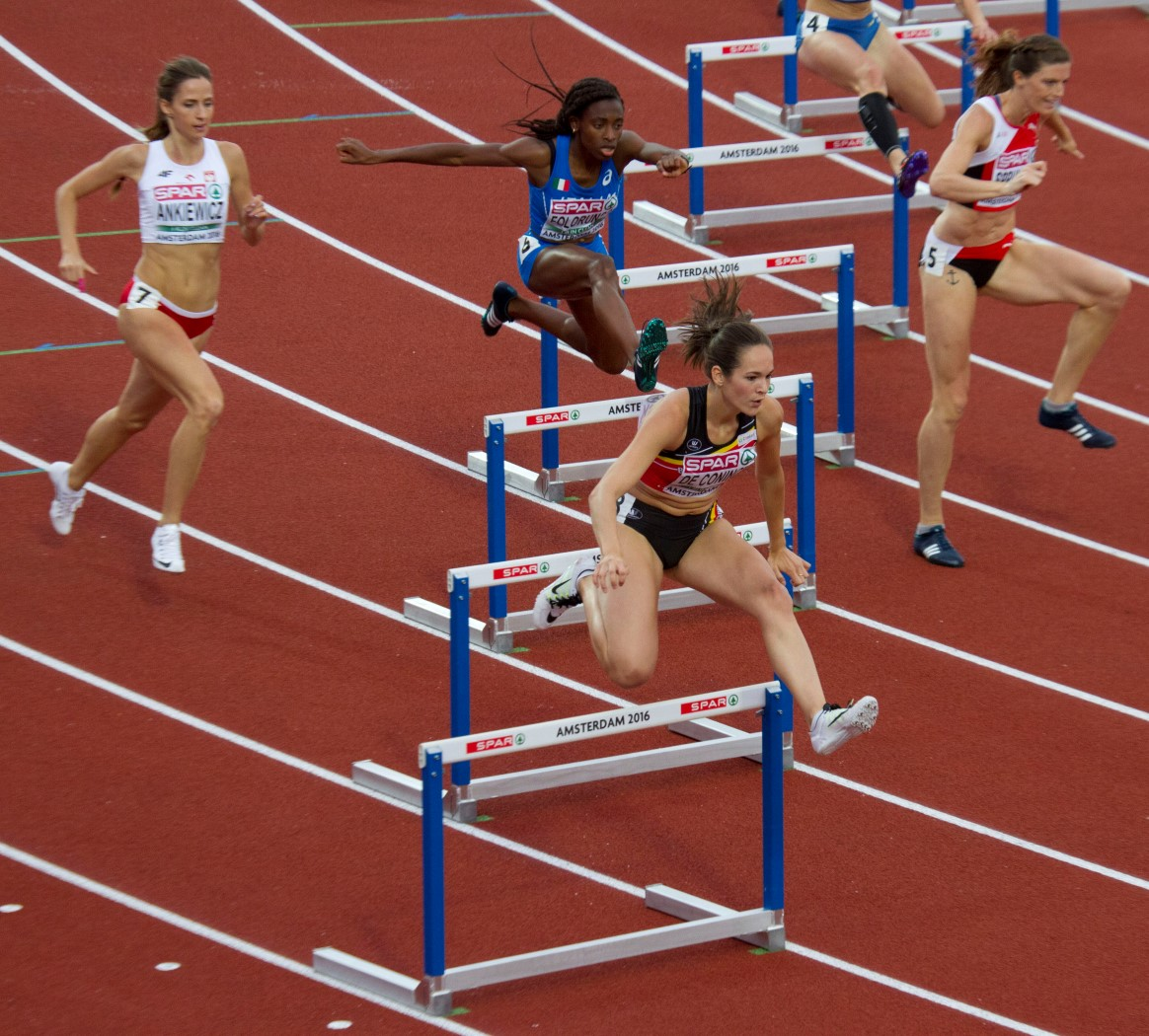
Heat 1

First 2 in each heat (Q) and the next fastest 2 (q) advance to the Final.

Rank	Heat	Lane	Name	Nationality	Time	Note
1	2	5	Sara Slott Petersen*	Denmark	55.59	Q
2	1	5	Léa Sprunger*	Switzerland	55.72	Q
3	3	5	Joanna Linkiewicz*	Poland	55.74	Q
4	2	8	Amalie Hammild Iuel	Norway	55.79	Q, NR
5	3	6	Katsiaryna Belanovich*	Belarus	55.82	Q
6	1	6	Ayomide Folorunso*	Italy	55.87	Q
7	3	8	Stina Troest	Denmark	56.03	q, SB
8	1	7	Emilia Ankiewicz	Poland	56.05	q, PB
9	2	4	Viktoriya Tkachuk*	Ukraine	56.17	
10	3	4	Anna Titimets*	Ukraine	56.18	
11	2	7	Bianca Baak	Netherlands	56.34	PB
12	2	3	Marzia Caravelli*	Italy	56.45	
13	2	6	Axelle Dauwens*	Belgium	56.62	
14	1	4	Olena Kolesnychenko*	Ukraine	56.84	
15	3	7	Christine McMahon	Ireland	56.87	
16	3	3	Phara Anacharsis	France	57.05	
17	2	2	Līga Velvere	Latvia	57.11	
18	2	1	Arna Stefanía Gudmundsdóttir	Iceland	57.24	
19	3	1	Petra Fontanive	Switzerland	57.42	
20	1	2	Aurélie Chaboudez	France	57.50	
21	1	8	Nenah de Coninck	Belgium	57.63	
22	1	1	Hilla Uusimäki	Finland	57.76	
23	3	2	Lucia Slaničková	Slovakia	57.86	
24	1	3	Vera Barbosa	Portugal	57.92	

*Athletes who received a bye to the semifinals

=== Final ===
Rank	Lane	Name	Nationality	Time	Note
1st place, gold medalist(s)	3	Sara Slott Petersen	Denmark	55.12	SB
2nd place, silver medalist(s)	5	Joanna Linkiewicz	Poland	55.33	
3rd place, bronze medalist(s)	4	Léa Sprunger	Switzerland	55.41	
4	7	Ayomide Folorunso	Italy	55.50	PB
5	8	Katsiaryna Belanovich	Belarus	56.10	
6	6	Amalie Hammild Iuel	Norway	56.24	
7	1	Stina Troest	Denmark	56.34	
8	2	Emilia Ankiewicz	Poland	57.31	
