= Athletics at the 2015 Summer Universiade – Women's 400 metres hurdles =

The women's 400 metres hurdles event at the 2015 Summer Universiade was held on 8 and 10 July at the Gwangju Universiade Main Stadium.

== Medalists ==
Gold	Silver	Bronze
Joanna Linkiewicz; Poland	Emilia Ankiewicz; Poland	Irina Takuncheva; Russia

== Results ==
=== Heats ===
Qualification: First 2 in each heat (Q) and next 2 fastest (q) qualified for the final.

Rank	Heat	Name	Nationality	Time	Notes
1	3	Joanna Linkiewicz	Poland	56.80	Q
2	1	Emilia Ankiewicz	Poland	57.06	Q, SB
3	3	Irina Takuncheva	Russia	57.19	Q
4	1	Christiane Klopsch	Germany	57.25	Q
5	2	Valeriya Khramova	Russia	57.38	Q, SB
6	2	Maris Mägi	Estonia	57.58	Q, SB
7	2	Ronda Whyte	Jamaica	57.70	q
8	2	Robine Schürmann	Switzerland	57.82	q
9	1	Anneri Ebersohn	South Africa	57.91	
10	3	Kelsey Balkwill	Canada	58.44	
11	1	Anniina Laitinen	Finland	58.50	
12	3	Lucia Slaničková	Slovakia	58.92	SB
13	2	Lynette Morgan	Sweden	59.33	SB
14	1	Desiré Bermúdez	Costa Rica	59.74	PB
15	2	Sanda Belgyan	Romania	1:00.26	
16	3	Aleksandra Romanova	Kazakhstan	1:00.52	
17	1	Iva Dimova	Bulgaria	1:00.55	
18	1	Karmen Veerme	Estonia	1:01.59	
19	3	Jineth Rodríguez	Venezuela	1:03.07	
20	2	Inese Negle	Latvia	1:03.58	
21	3	Josefina Baloloy	Philippines	1:06.38	
22	2	Brina Mljač	Slovenia	1:07.40	PB

=== Final ===
Official Video

Rank	Lane	Name	Nationality	Time	Notes
1st place, gold medalist(s)	6	Joanna Linkiewicz	Poland	55.62	
2nd place, silver medalist(s)	5	Emilia Ankiewicz	Poland	56.55	SB
3rd place, bronze medalist(s)	4	Irina Takuncheva	Russia	56.57	PB
4	7	Christiane Klopsch	Germany	56.75	
5	3	Valeriya Khramova	Russia	56.93	SB
6	1	Ronda Whyte	Jamaica	57.26	
7	2	Robine Schürmann	Switzerland	57.92	
8	8	Maris Mägi	Estonia	59.49	
