= Evonne Britton =

American hurdler (born 1991)

Personal information
- Full name: Evonne Fatimah Britton; Evonne Alisa Britton
- Nickname: Evowings
- Nationality: GHA
- Born: 28 July 1991 (age 35) Hyattsville, Maryland
- Home town: El Paso, Texas

Sport
- Sport: Athletics
- Events: 60 metres hurdles, 100 metres hurdles, 400 metres hurdles
- College team: Penn State Nittany Lions

Achievements and titles
- World finals: 2010 World U20s; • 100m hurdles, 6th; • 400m hurdles, 2nd (silver)
- National finals: 2010 USA U20s; • 100m hurdles, 2nd (silver); • 400m hurdles, 1st (gold); 2017 USA Indoors; • 60m hurdles, 5th; 2019 USA Indoors; • 60m hurdles, 2nd (silver); 2022 USA Indoors; • 60m hurdles, 6th
- Personal bests: 60mH: 7.86 (2019); 100mH: 12.78 (+1.2) (2016); 400mH: 57.32 (2010)
Medal record
Women's athletics
Representing United States
World U20 Championships
Silver medal – second place	2010 Moncton	400 m hurdles

Evonne Fatimah Britton (born 28 July 1991) is an American-born athlete who has represented Ghana in hurdling since 2024. In 2010, she was the silver medalist in the 400 metres hurdles at the World U20 Championships. Since 2015, Britton has focused on the short hurdles, where she was the runner up at the 2019 USA Indoor Track and Field Championships.

== Biography ==
Though Britton was born in Hyattsville, Maryland, she grew up in El Paso, Texas and began competitive sports in middle school. Attending Captain John L. Chapin High School, she was a Texas UIL state champion in the 100 metres hurdles.

At the 2010 World Junior Championships in Athletics, Britton won a bronze medal in the 400 m hurdles, which was later upgraded to a silver medal after the drugs disqualification of race winner Katsiaryna Artyukh.

She joined the Penn State Nittany Lions track and field team on a full athletic scholarship. At the end of her second year, she had meniscus surgery on her left knee due to a fall while hurdling. She was an eight-time outdoor and indoor NCAA championship meet qualifier, though all eight times she was eliminated in the heats or semi-finals.

At the 2016 United States Olympic trials, Britton set her personal best of 12.78 seconds in the 100 metres hurdles but did not qualify for the finals.

Britton achieved her first senior national podium finish in 2019, when she finished 2nd in the 60 m hurdles at the 2019 USA Indoor Track and Field Championships.

In 2021, Britton was studying for a master's degree in public education. She competed at the 2021 United States Olympic trials, but did not qualify for the finals.

Britton was born in the United States and is of Ghanaian descnet. In April 2024, Britton transferred her allegiance in athletics events from the United States to Ghana.

== Statistics ==
=== Personal bests ===
Event	Mark	Place	Competition	Venue	Date
60 metres hurdles	7.86	2nd place, silver medalist(s)	USA Indoor Track and Field Championships	Staten Island, New York	24 February 2019
100 metres hurdles	12.78 (+1.2 m/s)	2nd place, silver medalist(s)	Atlanta Georgia Relays International	Fairburn, Georgia	29 May 2016
400 metres hurdles	57.32	2nd place, silver medalist(s)	World Athletics U20 Championships	Moncton, Canada	24 July 2010

== Coaching career ==
Britton signed with Athletes Untapped as a private track and field coach on 3 November 2024.
