= Athletics at the 2009 European Youth Summer Olympic Festival =

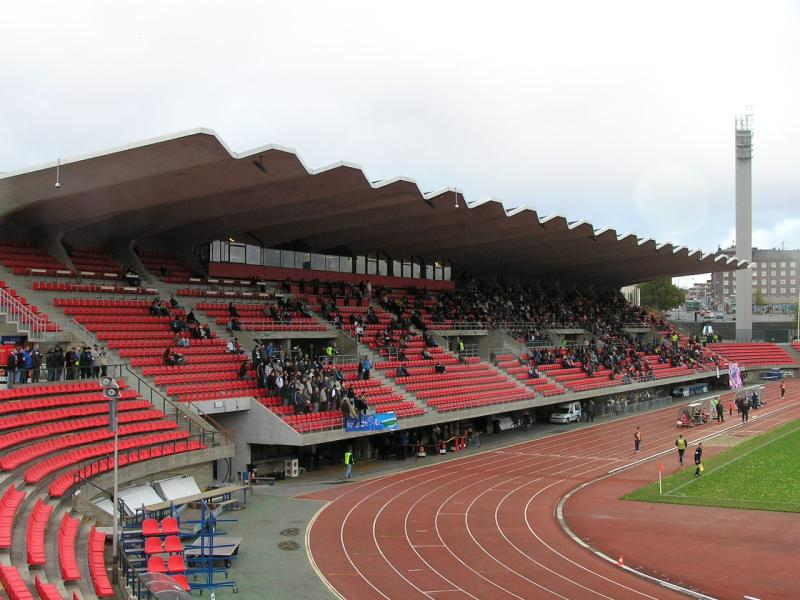
Tampere Stadium was the host venue for the athletics events

The athletics competition at the 2009 European Youth Summer Olympic Festival was held from 20 to 24 July. The events took place at the Tampere Stadium in Tampere, Finland. Boys and girls born 1992 or 1993 or later participated 36 track and field events, divided evenly between the sexes.

The event was held shortly after the 2009 World Youth Championships in Athletics. Vera Rudakova (400 m hurdles), Barbara Špiler (hammer throw) and high jumpers Dmitriy Kroyter and Alessia Trost were the four world youth champions to win at this European competition. The most successful athletes of the tournament were Jennie Batten, who did a 100 metres/200 metres double, and Lukas Weisshaidinger, who won both shot put and discus throw events. Sprinter Julien Watrin and middle-distance runner Ioana Doaga each won one gold and one silver, while 3000 metres champion Amela Terzić also made the 1500 metres podium.

== Medal summary ==
=== Men ===
Event	Gold		Silver		Bronze	
100 metres	Alberto Gavaldá (ESP)	10.77	Julien Watrin (BEL)	10.82	Giovanni Galbieri (ITA)	10.82
200 metres	Julien Watrin (BEL)	21.06	Jeffrey John (FRA)	21.15	Liam Clowes (GBR)	21.50
400 metres	Martin Vinš (CZE)	48.23	Olufemi Atibioke (GER)	48.32	Davide Re (ITA)	48.57
800 metres	Halit Kiliç (TUR)	1:55.79	Miroslav Burian (CZE)	1:56.47	Alejandro Estévez (ESP)	1:56.73
1500 metres	Rui Pinto (POR)	3:57.46	László Gregor (HUN)	3:58.00	Alexander Schwab (GER)	3:58.49
3000 metres	Callum Hawkins (GBR)	8:23.62	Shane Quinn (IRL)	8:30.12	Ilgizar Safiulin (RUS)	8:32.53
110 metres hurdles	Arnau Erta (ESP)	13.46	Charis Koutras (CYP)	13.57	Ivan Mach di Palmstein (ITA)	13.72
400 metres hurdles	Stef Vanhaeren (BEL)	51.09	José Bencosme De Leon (ITA)	52.27	Rasmus Mägi (EST)	52.85
2000 metres steeplechase	Benjámin Szalai (HUN)	5:53.31	Romain Collenot-Spiret (FRA)	5:54.13	Stephan Abisch (GER)	5:54.30
4 × 100 m relay	Spain (ESP); José Antonio Vizuete; Bertrán Alcaraz; Alberto Gavaldá; Arnau Erta	41.20	France (FRA); Nicolas Borome; Jeffrey John; Victor Barroso; Vincent Michalet	41.31	Belgium (BEL); Rodric Seutin; Frederick Claes; Stef Vanhaeren; Julien Watrin	41.69
High jump	Daniil Tsyplakov (RUS)	2.21 m	Dmitry Kroyter (ISR)	2.19 m	Janick Klausen (DEN)	2.14 m
Pole vault	Arnaud Art (BEL)	4.85 m	Ivan Horvat (CRO)	4.75 m	Thomas Pastl (AUT)	4.75 m
Long jump	Andreas Trajkovski (DEN)	7.37 m	Jean-Pierre Bertrand (FRA)	7.30 m	Daniel Dobrev (BUL)	7.30 m
Triple jump	Aleksandr Yurchenko (RUS)	15.30 m	Aliaksandr Khryshchanovich (BLR)	15.24 m	Yevgeniy Strokan (UKR)	15.19 m
Shot put	Lukas Weisshaidinger (AUT)	20.35 m	Daniele Secci (ITA)	19.08 m	Maksim Afonin (RUS)	19.06 m
Discus throw	Lukas Weisshaidinger (AUT)	60.94 m	Marek Bárta (CZE)	60.49 m	Michael Klatsia (CYP)	59.83 m
Hammer throw	Tomáš Kružliak (SVK)	74.24 m	Yevgeniy Korotovskiy (RUS)	72.63 m	Edgars Timermanis (LAT)	71.49 m
Javelin throw	Valeriy Iordan (RUS)	75.59 m	Arnolds Strenga (LAT)	69.73 m	Aleksandr Nychyporchuk (UKR)	67.67 m

=== Women ===
Event	Gold		Silver		Bronze	
100 metres	Jennie Batten (GBR)	11.73	Mujinga Kambundji (SUI)	11.84	Anasztázia Nguyen (HUN)	11.85
200 metres	Jennie Batten (GBR)	23.80 w	Imke Vervaet (BEL)	24.35 w	Klaudia Konopko (POL)	24.41 w
400 metres	Yuliya Yurenia (BLR)	53.90	Christina Zwirner (GER)	54.59	Adelina Pastor (ROU)	54.72
800 metres	Ioana Doaga (ROU)	2:09.56	Adelle Tracey (GBR)	2:09.92	Andrina Schläpfer (SUI)	2:09.93
1500 metres	Ciara Mageean (IRL)	4:15.46	Ioana Doaga (ROU)	4:18.44	Amela Terzić (SRB)	4:22.46
3000 metres	Amela Terzić (SRB)	9:17.90	Gulshat Fazlitdinova (RUS)	9:30.82	Aleksandra Oliynyk (UKR)	9:37.59
100 metres hurdles	Nooralotta Neziri (FIN)	13.23	Yekaterina Bleskina (RUS)	13.24	Eva Vital (POR)	13.39
400 metres hurdles	Vera Rudakova (RUS)	58.01	Christine McMahon (IRL)	59.55	Bianca Baak (NED)	60.31
2000 metres steeplechase	Sofie Gallein (BEL)	6:42.71	Teodora Simovic (SRB)	6:47.43	Gamze Bulut (TUR)	6:50.24
4 × 100 m relay	Switzerland (SUI); Silja Muhlebach; Mujinga Kambundji; Nora Frey; Cornelia Halbheer	46.30	Hungary (HUN); Anasztázia Nguyen; Kriszta Komiszár; Gréta Kerekes; Lilla Loránd	46.38	Ireland (IRL); Christine McMahon; Joanna Mills; Caoimhe King; Joan Healy	46.56
High jump	Alessia Trost (ITA)	1.85 m	Mariya Kuchina (RUS)	1.85 m	Laura Ikauniece (LAT)	1.82 m
Pole vault	Tatyana Stetsyuk (RUS)	3.90 m	Reetta Hämäläinen (FIN)	3.85 m	Aurélie De Ryck (BEL)	3.80 m
Long jump	Lena Malkus (GER)	6.33 m	Alina Rotaru (ROU)	6.24 m	Lotta Harala (FIN)	6.14 m
Triple jump	Tatiana Cicanci (MDA)	13.37 m	Kristiina Mäkelä (FIN)	13.14 m	Andreea Todereanu (ROU)	13.14 m
Shot put	Corinne Nugter (NED)	14.58 m	Natalya Troneva (RUS)	13.84 m	Elçin Kaya (TUR)	13.71 m
Discus throw	Viktoriya Klochko (UKR)	48.32 m	Corinne Nugter (NED)	45.54 m	Kristin Pudenz (GER)	44.71 m
Hammer throw	Barbara Špiler (SLO)	63.57 m	Kıvılcım Kaya (TUR)	60.30 m	Bianca Lazar (ROU)	56.97 m
Javelin throw	Liina Laasma (EST)	53.66 m	Marija Vucenovic (SRB)	51.46 m	Nathalie Meier (SUI)	47.20 m
