= 2013 European Athletics U23 Championships – Women's 400 metres hurdles =

The Women's 400 metres hurdles event at the 2013 European Athletics U23 Championships was held in Tampere, Finland, at Ratina Stadium on 12 and 13 July.

== Medalists ==
Gold	Vera Rudakova; Russia
Silver	Bianca Baak; Netherlands
Bronze	Anastasiya Lebid; Ukraine

== Results ==
=== Final ===
13 July 2013

Rank	Name	Nationality	Lane	Reaction Time	Time	Notes
1st place, gold medalist(s)	Vera Rudakova	Russia	4	0.272	55.92	PB
2nd place, silver medalist(s)	Bianca Baak	Netherlands	5	0.235	56.75	PB
3rd place, bronze medalist(s)	Anastasiya Lebid	Ukraine	6	0.294	56.92	
4	Aurélie Chaboudez	France	3	0.211	57.13	
5	Joanna Banach	Poland	2	0.223	57.27	PB
6	Klaudia Żurek	Poland	8	0.194	58.24	
7	Frederike Hogrebe	Germany	1	0.243	58.52	
8	Agnieszka Karczmarczyk	Poland	7	0.200	58.55	

=== Heats ===
Qualified: First 2 in each heat (Q) and 2 best performers (q) advance to the Final

==== Summary ====
Rank	Name	Nationality	Time	Notes
1	Vera Rudakova	Russia	57.15	Q
2	Aurélie Chaboudez	France	57.40	Q
3	Bianca Baak	Netherlands	57.58	Q PB
4	Joanna Banach	Poland	57.87	q
5	Anastasiya Lebid	Ukraine	58.20	Q
6	Agnieszka Karczmarczyk	Poland	58.54	Q
7	Klaudia Żurek	Poland	58.94	Q
8	Frederike Hogrebe	Germany	59.11	q
9	Marina Reznikova	Russia	59.31	
10	Sanda Belgyan	Romania	59.45	SB
10	Gabrielle Coveney	Ireland	59.45	
12	Maëva Contion	France	59.87	
13	Katsiaryna Khairullina	Belarus	1:00.52	
14	Fanny Lefèvre	France	1:00.53	
15	Andreia Crespo	Portugal	1:01.66	
16	Stefanía Valdimarsdóttir	Iceland	1:01.68	
17	Irma Mačiukaitė	Lithuania	1:03.02	
	Emel Şanlı	Turkey	DQ	R 162.7

==== Details ====
===== Heat 1 =====
12 July 2013 / 17:00

Rank	Name	Nationality	Lane	Reaction Time	Time	Notes
1	Aurélie Chaboudez	France	7	0.200	57.40	Q
2	Bianca Baak	Netherlands	4	0.179	57.58	Q PB
3	Joanna Banach	Poland	5	0.252	57.87	q
4	Katsiaryna Khairullina	Belarus	2	0.264	1:00.52	
5	Stefanía Valdimarsdóttir	Iceland	3	0.146	1:01.68	
	Emel Şanlı	Turkey	6		F1F2	DQ R 162.7

===== Heat 2 =====
12 July 2013 / 17:08

Rank	Name	Nationality	Lane	Reaction Time	Time	Notes
1	Anastasiya Lebid	Ukraine	4	0.315	58.20	Q
2	Klaudia Żurek	Poland	7	0.213	58.94	Q
3	Marina Reznikova	Russia	2	0.215	59.31	
4	Sanda Belgyan	Romania	6	0.218	59.45	SB
5	Maëva Contion	France	5	0.182	59.87	
6	Andreia Crespo	Portugal	3	0.181	1:01.66	

===== Heat 3 =====
12 July 2013 / 17:16

Rank	Name	Nationality	Lane	Reaction Time	Time	Notes
1	Vera Rudakova	Russia	7	0.262	57.15	Q
2	Agnieszka Karczmarczyk	Poland	6	0.206	58.54	Q
3	Frederike Hogrebe	Germany	2	0.178	59.11	q
4	Gabrielle Coveney	Ireland	4	0.231	59.45	
5	Fanny Lefèvre	France	5	0.255	1:00.53	
6	Irma Mačiukaitė	Lithuania	3	0.170	1:03.02	

== Participation ==
According to an unofficial count, 18 athletes from 13 countries participated in the event.

- Belarus (1)
- France (3)
- Germany (1)
- Iceland (1)
- Ireland (1)
- Lithuania (1)
- Netherlands (1)
- Poland (3)
- Portugal (1)
- Romania (1)
- Russia (2)
- Turkey (1)
- Ukraine (1)
