= 2015 European Athletics U23 Championships – Women's 400 metres hurdles =

The women's 400 metres hurdles event at the 2015 European Athletics U23 Championships was held in Tallinn, Estonia, at Kadriorg Stadium on 10, 11 and 12 July.

== Medalists ==
| Gold | Elise Malmberg; Sweden |
| Silver | Stina Troest; Denmark |
| Bronze | Aurélie Chaboudez; France |

== Results ==
=== Final ===
12 July

| Rank | Name | Nationality | Reaction Time | Time | Notes |
|---|---|---|---|---|---|
| 1st place, gold medalist(s) | Elise Malmberg | Sweden | 0.198 | 55.88 | PB |
| 2nd place, silver medalist(s) | Stina Troest | Denmark | 0.165 | 56.01 | |
| 3rd place, bronze medalist(s) | Aurélie Chaboudez | France | 0.226 | 56.04 | |
| 4 | Shona Richards | United Kingdom | 0.153 | 56.05 | PB |
| 5 | Amalie Hammild Iuel | Norway | 0.177 | 56.36 | NUR |
| 6 | Olena Kolesnychenko | Ukraine | 0.164 | 56.83 | SB |
| 7 | Anastasiya Lebid | Ukraine | 0.243 | 57.58 | |
| 8 | Jackie Baumann | Germany | 0.240 | 58.14 | |

=== Semifinals ===
11 July

==== Semifinal 1 ====
| Rank | Name | Nationality | Reaction Time | Time | Notes |
|---|---|---|---|---|---|
| 1 | Stina Troest | Denmark | 0.164 | 55.91 | Q |
| 2 | Elise Malmberg | Sweden | 0.186 | 56.86 | Q |
| 3 | Olena Kolesnychenko | Ukraine | 0.131 | 56.86 | Q |
| 4 | Anastasiya Lebid | Ukraine | 0.264 | 56.97 | SB q |
| 5 | Shona Richards | United Kingdom | 0.179 | 56.99 | SB q |
| 6 | Joan Medjid | France | 0.189 | 58.52 | |
| 7 | Lucie Taclíková | Czech Republic | 0.209 | 59.53 | |
| 8 | Emel Şanlı | Turkey | | 59.89 | |

==== Semifinal 2 ====
| Rank | Name | Nationality | Reaction Time | Time | Notes |
|---|---|---|---|---|---|
| 1 | Amalie Hammild Iuel | Norway | 0.166 | 56.60 | NUR Q |
| 2 | Jackie Baumann | Germany | 0.233 | 56.62 | PB Q |
| 3 | Aurélie Chaboudez | France | 0.219 | 56.97 | Q |
| 4 | Viktoriya Tkachuk | Ukraine | 0.199 | 57.30 | |
| 5 | Agnieszka Karczmarczyk | Poland | 0.215 | 58.02 | SB |
| 6 | Margaux Soriano | France | 0.194 | 58.25 | |
| 7 | Andreia Crespo | Portugal | 0.198 | 58.60 | |
| 8 | Eveliina Määttänen | Finland | 0.211 | 59.37 | |

=== Heats ===
10 July

==== Heat 1 ====
| Rank | Name | Nationality | Reaction Time | Time | Notes |
|---|---|---|---|---|---|
| 1 | Shona Richards | United Kingdom | 0.169 | 57.40 | Q |
| 2 | Stina Troest | Denmark | 0.160 | 57.42 | Q |
| 3 | Anastasiya Lebid | Ukraine | 0.242 | 58.18 | Q |
| 4 | Lucie Taclíková | Czech Republic | 0.227 | 59.03 | q |
| 5 | Eveliina Määttänen | Finland | 0.195 | 59.29 | SB q |
| 6 | Marlen Aakre | Norway | 0.168 | 60.15 | |
| 7 | Laura Oberto | Italy | 0.196 | 60.59 | |

==== Heat 2 ====
| Rank | Name | Nationality | Reaction Time | Time | Notes |
|---|---|---|---|---|---|
| 1 | Viktoriya Tkachuk | Ukraine | 0.211 | 58.02 | Q |
| 2 | Joan Medjid | France | 0.186 | 58.61 | Q |
| 3 | Elise Malmberg | Sweden | 0.200 | 58.93 | Q |
| 4 | Andreia Crespo | Portugal | 0.192 | 59.21 | q |
| 5 | Emel Şanlı | Turkey | 0.248 | 59.29 | q |
| 6 | Anna Berghii | Moldova | 0.175 | 59.78 | |
| 7 | Aleksandra Lokshin | Israel | 0.140 | 61.62 | |

==== Heat 3 ====
| Rank | Name | Nationality | Reaction Time | Time | Notes |
|---|---|---|---|---|---|
| 1 | Olena Kolesnychenko | Ukraine | 0.175 | 58.24 | Q |
| 2 | Amalie Hammild Iuel | Norway | 0.151 | 58.51 | Q |
| 3 | Margaux Soriano | France | 0.203 | 58.64 | Q |
| 4 | Valentina Cavalleri | Italy | 0.196 | 59.47 | PB |
| 5 | Arna Stefanía Gudmundsdóttir | Iceland | 0.160 | 60.03 | |
| 6 | Viktoriya Shymanskaya | Belarus | 0.148 | 60.49 | |
| 7 | Derya Yıldırım | Turkey | 0.212 | 64.36 | |

==== Heat 4 ====
| Rank | Name | Nationality | Reaction Time | Time | Notes |
|---|---|---|---|---|---|
| 1 | Aurélie Chaboudez | France | 0.198 | 57.91 | Q |
| 2 | Jackie Baumann | Germany | 0.273 | 58.49 | Q |
| 3 | Agnieszka Karczmarczyk | Poland | 0.183 | 58.50 | Q |
| 4 | Yelizaveta Anikiyenko | Russia | | 59.29 | |
| 5 | Kirsi Pekkanen | Finland | 0.166 | 59.90 | PB |
| 6 | Effrosíni Theodórou | Greece | 0.197 | 60.35 | |
| 7 | Alena Hrusoci | Croatia | 0.207 | 61.90 | |

== Participation ==
According to an unofficial count, 28 athletes from 20 countries participated in the event.

- Belarus (1)
- Croatia (1)
- Czech Republic (1)
- Denmark (1)
- Finland (2)
- France (3)
- Germany (1)
- Greece (1)
- Iceland (1)
- Israel (1)
- Italy (2)
- Moldova (1)
- Norway (2)
- Poland (1)
- Portugal (1)
- Russia (1)
- Sweden (1)
- Turkey (2)
- Ukraine (3)
- United Kingdom (1)
