= Sanda Belgyan =

Romanian sprinter (born 1992)

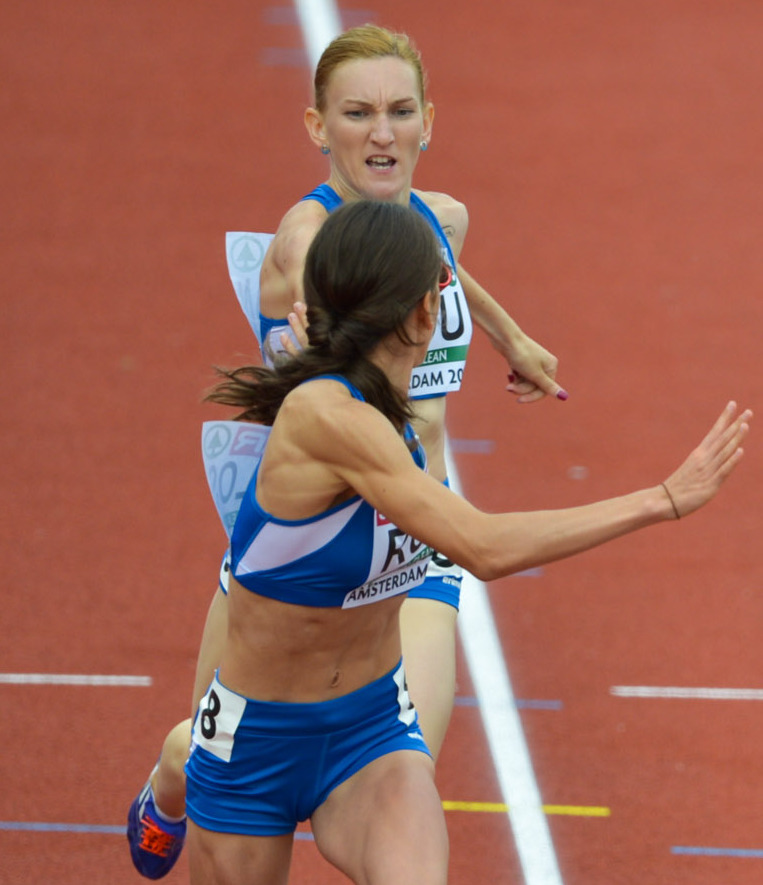
- 2016 European Championships

Personal information
- Born: 17 December 1992 (age 33)
- Education: Babeș-Bolyai University

Sport
- Sport: Athletics
- Event(s): 400 m, 400 m hurdles

Sanda Belgyan (born 17 December 1992) is a Romanian athlete specialising in the 400 metres and 400 metres hurdles. She competed in the 4 × 400 metres relay at the 2013 and 2015 World Championships reaching the final on the first occasion.

== International competitions ==
Year	Competition	Venue	Position	Event	Notes
Representing Romania
2009	World Youth Championships	Brixen, Italy	9th (h)	400 m hurdles	61.68
2009	World Youth Championships	Brixen, Italy	3rd	Medley relay	2:09.25
2010	World Junior Championships	Moncton, Canada	18th (h)	400 m hurdles	61.75
2010	World Junior Championships	Moncton, Canada	–	4 × 400 m relay	DQ
2011	European Junior Championships	Tallinn, Estonia	10th (sf)	400 m hurdles	59.15
2011	European Junior Championships	Tallinn, Estonia	–	4 × 400 m relay	DQ
2012	European Championships	Helsinki, Finland	17th (h)	400 m	53.32
2012	European Championships	Helsinki, Finland	7th	4 × 400 m relay	3:29.80
2013	European U23 Championships	Tampere, Finland	10th (h)	400 m hurdles	59.45
2013	European U23 Championships	Tampere, Finland	2nd	4 × 400 m relay	3:30.28
2013	World Championships	Moscow, Russia	7th	4 × 400 m relay	3:28.40
2013	Jeux de la Francophonie	Nice, France	7th	400 m hurdles	59.08
2013	Jeux de la Francophonie	Nice, France	1st	4 × 400 m relay	3:29.81
2014	World Indoor Championships	Sopot, Poland	8th (h)	4 × 400 m relay	3:38.18
2015	Universiade	Gwangju, South Korea	8th	400 m	53.36
2015	Universiade	Gwangju, South Korea	15th (h)	400 m hurdles	60.26
2015	World Championships	Beijing, China	11th (h)	4 × 400 m relay	3:28.60
2016	European Championships	Amsterdam, Netherlands	15th (h)	400 m	54.33
2016	European Championships	Amsterdam, Netherlands	8th	4 × 400 m relay	3:30.63
2017	Universiade	Taipei, Taiwan	11th (h)	400 m hurdles	59.50
2017	Universiade	Taipei, Taiwan	3rd	4 × 400 m relay	3:34.16
2018	European Championships	Berlin, Germany	22nd (sf)	400 m hurdles	57.51
2018	European Championships	Berlin, Germany	7th	4 × 400 m relay	3:32.15

== Personal bests ==
Outdoor

- 400 metres – 52.47 (Bucharest 2012)
- 400 metres hurdles – 58.13 (Stara Zagora 2013)

Indoor

- 400 metres – 54.49 (Istanbul 2014)
