= 2018 European Athletics Championships – Women's 400 metres hurdles =

Women's 400 metres hurdles at the 2018 European Athletics Championships
- Venue: Olympic Stadium
- Location: Berlin
- Dates: August 7 (round 1); August 8 (semifinals); August 10 (final)
- Competitors: 33 from 19 nations
- Winning time: 54.33

Medalists
gold medal	Léa Sprunger	Switzerland
silver medal	Hanna Ryzhykova	Ukraine
bronze medal	Meghan Beesley	Great Britain

The women's 400 metres hurdles at the 2018 European Athletics Championships takes place at the Olympic Stadium on 7, 8 and 10 August.

== Records ==
Standing records prior to the 2018 European Athletics Championships
World record	Yuliya Pechenkina (RUS)	52.34	Tula, Russia	8 August 2003
European record	Yuliya Pechenkina (RUS)	52.34	Tula, Russia	8 August 2003
Championship record	Natalya Antyukh (RUS)	52.92	Barcelona, Spain	30 July 2010
World Leading	Sydney McLaughlin (USA)	52.75	Knoxville, United States	13 May 2018
European Leading	Léa Sprunger (SUI)	54.79	Lausanne, Switzerland	5 July 2018
Broken records during the 2018 European Athletics Championships
European Leading	Léa Sprunger (SUI)	54.33	Berlin, Germany	10 August 2018

== Schedule ==
Date	Time	Round
7 August 2018	10:00	Round 1
8 August 2018	19:05	Semifinals
10 August 2018	20:50	Final

All times are local times (UTC+2)

== Results ==
=== Round 1 ===
First 3 in each heat (Q) and the next fastest 3 (q) advance to the Semifinals. 12 fastest entrants awarded bye to Semifinals.

Rank	Heat	Lane	Name	Nationality	Time	Note
1	2	6	Vera Rudakova	Authorised Neutral Athletes	56.24	Q
2	3	8	Robine Schürmann	Switzerland	56.35	Q
3	3	7	Mariya Mykolenko	Ukraine	56.39	Q
4	1	2	Joanna Linkiewicz	Poland	56.66	Q
5	2	5	Sanda Belgyan	Romania	56.68	Q, SB
6	2	7	Margo Van Puyvelde	Belgium	56.70	Q
7	1	8	Kirsten McAslan	Great Britain	56.78	Q
8	3	4	Justien Grillet	Belgium	56.94	Q
9	1	5	Aurélie Chaboudez	France	57.08	Q
10	3	6	Sara Gallego	Spain	57.18	q
11	2	3	Justyna Saganiak	Poland	57.24	q
12	1	3	Yasmin Giger	Switzerland	57.40	q
13	1	4	Elif Gören	Turkey	57.53	
14	3	3	Johanna Holmén Svensson	Sweden	57.55	=PB
15	3	2	Anna Sjoukje Runia	Netherlands	57.76	
16	1	7	Daniela Ledecká	Slovakia	57.81	PB
17	2	8	Viivi Lehikoinen	Finland	58.43	
18	2	4	Emma Zapletalová	Slovakia	58.46	
19	1	6	Linda Olivieri	Italy	58.47	
20	3	5	Elisabeth Slettum	Norway	58.56	
21	2	2	Drita Islami	Macedonia	1:02.23	

=== Semifinals ===
First 2 (Q) and next 2 fastest (q) qualify for the final.

Rank	Heat	Lane	Name	Nationality	Time	Note
1	3	3	Hanna Ryzhykova*	Ukraine	54.82	Q, SB
2	2	3	Léa Sprunger*	Switzerland	55.04	Q
3	3	4	Yadisleidy Pedroso*	Italy	55.13	Q
4	1	4	Eilidh Doyle*	Great Britain	55.16	Q
5	3	6	Meghan Beesley*	Great Britain	55.21	q, SB
6	3	8	Vera Rudakova	Authorised Neutral Athletes	55.24	q, SB
7	2	5	Viktoriya Tkachuk*	Ukraine	55.37	Q
8	2	4	Ayomide Folorunso*	Italy	55.69	
9	1	3	Hanne Claes*	Belgium	55.75	Q
10	2	6	Line Kloster*	Norway	55.78	
11	1	6	Amalie Iuel*	Norway	55.81	
12	1	7	Robine Schürmann	Switzerland	55.89	
13	3	5	Zuzana Hejnová*	Czech Republic	56.03	
14	2	8	Joanna Linkiewicz	Poland	56.06	
15	2	7	Aurélie Chaboudez	France	56.19	SB
16	1	8	Mariya Mykolenko	Ukraine	56.35	
17	3	1	Yasmin Giger	Switzerland	56.81	EU20L
18	1	5	Sara Petersen*	Denmark	56.91	
19	3	2	Sara Gallego	Spain	57.25	
20	2	2	Kirsten McAslan	Great Britain	57.33	
21	2	1	Justien Grillet	Belgium	57.40	
22	1	1	Sanda Belgyan	Romania	57.51	
23	1	2	Justyna Saganiak	Poland	57.71	
	3	7	Margo Van Puyvelde	Belgium	DNS	

=== Final ===
Rank	Lane	Name	Nationality	Time	Note
1st place, gold medalist(s)	3	Léa Sprunger	Switzerland	54.33	EL
2nd place, silver medalist(s)	5	Hanna Ryzhykova	Ukraine	54.51	SB
3rd place, bronze medalist(s)	1	Meghan Beesley	Great Britain	55.31	
4	7	Hanne Claes	Belgium	55.75	
5	4	Yadisleidy Pedroso	Italy	55.80	
6	2	Vera Rudakova	Authorised Neutral Athletes	55.89	
7	8	Viktoriya Tkachuk	Ukraine	56.15	
8	6	Eilidh Doyle	Great Britain	56.23	
