= Petra Fontanive =

Swiss hurdler

Personal information
- Born: 10 October 1988 (age 37)
- Height: 1.70 m (5 ft 7 in)
- Weight: 60 kg (132 lb)

Sport
- Sport: Track and field
- Event: 400 metres hurdles
- Club: LAC TV Unterstrass Zürich

Petra Fontanive (born 10 October 1988) is a Swiss athlete specialising in the 400 metres hurdles. She represented her country at the 2015 World Championships in Beijing and 2017 World Championships in London reaching the semifinals on both occasions. Fontanive also participated in 2016 Summer Olympics in Rio de Janeiro, where she finished sixth in her heat and did not advance to the semifinal. Her personal best in the event is 54.56 seconds set in Geneva in 2017.

== International competitions ==
Year	Competition	Venue	Position	Event	Notes
Representing Switzerland
2007	European Junior Championships	Hengelo, Netherlands	22nd (h)	400 m hurdles	61.08
2009	European U23 Championships	Kaunas, Lithuania	29th (h)	100 m hurdles	14.16
2009	European U23 Championships	Kaunas, Lithuania	25th (h)	400 m hurdles	61.03
2014	European Championships	Zurich, Switzerland	16th (sf)	400 m hurdles	57.53
2015	World Championships	Beijing, China	18th (sf)	400 m hurdles	56.35
2016	European Championships	Amsterdam, Netherlands	19th (sf)	400 m hurdles	57.42
2016	Olympic Games	Rio de Janeiro, Brazil	30th (h)	400 m hurdles	56.80
2017	World Championships	London, United Kingdom	12th (sf)	400 m hurdles	55.79
