= 2010 World Junior Championships in Athletics – Women's 100 metres hurdles =

The women's 100 metres hurdles event at the 2010 World Junior Championships in Athletics was held in Moncton, New Brunswick, Canada, at Moncton Stadium on 20, 21 and 22 July.

== Medalists ==
Gold	Isabelle Pedersen; Norway
Silver	Jenna Pletsch; Germany
Bronze	Miriam Hehl; Germany

== Results ==
=== Final ===
22 July
Wind: +0.9 m/s

Rank	Name	Nationality	Time	Notes
1st place, gold medalist(s)	Isabelle Pedersen	Norway	13.30	
2nd place, silver medalist(s)	Jenna Pletsch	Germany	13.35	
3rd place, bronze medalist(s)	Miriam Hehl	Germany	13.46	
4	Danielle Williams	Jamaica	13.46	
5	Nooralotta Neziri	Finland	13.49	
6	Evonne Britton	United States	13.50	
7	Jessica Alcan	France	13.55	
8	Gayathri Govindharaj	India	13.72	

=== Semifinals ===
21 July

==== Semifinal 1 ====
Wind: +2.0 m/s

Rank	Name	Nationality	Time	Notes
1	Isabelle Pedersen	Norway	13.49	Q
2	Jenna Pletsch	Germany	13.62	Q
3	Gayathri Govindharaj	India	13.71	Q
4	Jessica Alcan	France	13.76	q
5	Doniqué Flemings	United States	13.79	
6	Caroline Lundahl	Sweden	13.97	
7	Eva Vital	Portugal	14.18	
	Rosie Lawson	Australia	DNF	

==== Semifinal 2 ====
Wind: +1.6 m/s

Rank	Name	Nationality	Time	Notes
1	Evonne Britton	United States	13.58	Q
2	Danielle Williams	Jamaica	13.63	Q
3	Nooralotta Neziri	Finland	13.63	Q
4	Miriam Hehl	Germany	13.73	q
5	Ivanique Kemp	Bahamas	13.77	
6	Ivana Loncarek	Croatia	13.83	
7	Helena Tomková	Czech Republic	13.83	
8	Emma Tuvesson	Sweden	13.84	

=== Heats ===
20 July

==== Heat 1 ====
Wind: +1.3 m/s

Rank	Name	Nationality	Time	Notes
1	Doniqué Flemings	United States	13.50	Q
2	Jessica Alcan	France	13.56	Q
3	Gayathri Govindharaj	India	13.59	Q
4	Eva Vital	Portugal	13.66	q
5	Ivana Loncarek	Croatia	13.80	q
6	Caroline Lundahl	Sweden	13.80	q
7	Lotta Harala	Finland	13.92	
8	Kine Aaltvedt	Norway	13.96	

==== Heat 2 ====
Wind: -0.6 m/s

Rank	Name	Nationality	Time	Notes
1	Nooralotta Neziri	Finland	13.54	Q
2	Evonne Britton	United States	13.57	Q
3	Danielle Williams	Jamaica	13.78	Q
4	Emma Tuvesson	Sweden	13.81	q
5	Sandra Sogoyou	France	13.87	
6	Caridad Jerez	Spain	13.98	
7	Chanice Chase	Canada	14.32	
8	Huang Wen-Lin	Chinese Taipei	14.75	

==== Heat 3 ====
Wind: -0.2 m/s

Rank	Name	Nationality	Time	Notes
1	Jenna Pletsch	Germany	13.37	Q
2	Isabelle Pedersen	Norway	13.56	Q
3	Ivanique Kemp	Bahamas	13.58	Q
4	Ashlea Maddex	Canada	13.82	
5	Alina Antipova	Russia	13.92	
6	Alessandra Feudatari	Italy	14.00	
7	Eleni Nikolaou	Cyprus	14.14	
8	Aigerim Shynazbekova	Kazakhstan	14.21	

==== Heat 4 ====
Wind: +1.8 m/s

Rank	Name	Nationality	Time	Notes
1	Miriam Hehl	Germany	13.49	Q
2	Helena Tomková	Czech Republic	13.77	Q
3	Rosie Lawson	Australia	13.83	Q
4	Tonique Sobah	Jamaica	13.96	
5	Aoi Kawasaki	Japan	14.07	
6	Mihaela Gutu	Romania	14.25	
7	Agustina Bawele	Indonesia	14.79	
	Gréta Kerekes	Hungary	DNF	

== Participation ==
According to an unofficial count, 32 athletes from 24 countries participated in the event.

- Australia (1)
- Bahamas (1)
- Canada (2)
- Chinese Taipei (1)
- Croatia (1)
- Cyprus (1)
- Czech Republic (1)
- Finland (2)
- France (2)
- Germany (2)
- Hungary (1)
- India (1)
- Indonesia (1)
- Italy (1)
- Jamaica (2)
- Japan (1)
- Kazakhstan (1)
- Norway (2)
- Portugal (1)
- Romania (1)
- Russia (1)
- Spain (1)
- Sweden (2)
- United States (2)
