= Elise Malmberg =

Swedish athlete

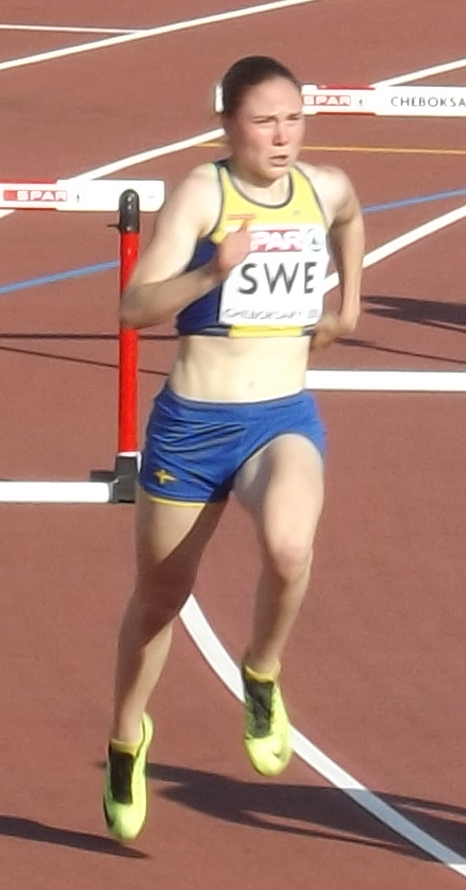
- Elise Malmberg at the 2015 European Team Championships

Personal information
- Born: 13 July 1995 (age 30)

Sport
- Sport: Track and field
- Event: 400 metres hurdles

Elise Malmberg (born 13 July 1995) is a Swedish athlete specialising in the 400 metres hurdles. She represented her country at the 2015 World Championships in Beijing reaching the semifinals. In addition she won the gold at the 2015 European U23 Championships. Her personal best in the 400 metres hurdles is 55.88 seconds set in Tallinn in 2015. Her indoor 400 metres best is 53.81 (Prague 2015).

== International competitions ==
Year	Competition	Venue	Position	Event	Notes
Representing Sweden
2011	World Youth Championships	Lille, France	5th	Heptathlon (youth)	5335 pts
2012	World Junior Championships	Barcelona, Spain	15th (q)	Long jump	6.15 m
2013	European Junior Championships	Rieti, Italy	11th (sf)	100 m hurdles	13.88
2013	European Junior Championships	Rieti, Italy	6th	Long jump	6.15 m
2014	World Junior Championships	Eugene, United States	31st (h)	100 m hurdles	14.19
2014	World Junior Championships	Eugene, United States	8th	Long jump	5.95 m
2015	European Indoor Championships	Prague, Czech Republic	17th (h)	400 m	53.81
2015	European U23 Championships	Tallinn, Estonia	1st	400 m hurdles	55.88
2015	World Championships	Beijing, China	23rd (sf)	400 m hurdles	56.58
