= Maëva Contion =

French hurdler (born 1992)

Personal information
- Born: 31 May 1992 (age 33) Creil, France
- Years active: 2010s
- Height: 1.68 m (5 ft 6 in)

Sport
- Country: France
- Sport: Track and field
- Event: 400 m hurdles
- Club: Entente Oise athlétisme
- Coached by: Laurent Hernu

Maëva Contion (born 31 May 1992 at Creil) is a French athlete, who specializes in the 400 meters hurdles.

== Biography ==
Junior Champion of France in 2010 and 2011, she won the bronze medal at the 2011 European Junior Championships where she ran 58.03. She was champion of France U23s in 2012 and 2014.

In 2015, at Villeneuve d'Ascq she won the French Elite Championships in 56.03, a personal best.

== Prize list ==
=== International competitions ===
Year	Competition	Venue	Position	Event	Notes
Representing France
2011	European Junior Championships	Tallinn, Estonia	3rd	400 m hurdles	58.03
2011	European Junior Championships	Tallinn, Estonia	5th	4 × 400 m relay	3:37.57
2013	European U23 Championships	Tampere, Finland	12th (h)	400 m hurdles	59.87
2016	European Championships	Amsterdam, Netherlands	19th (h)	400 m hurdles	58.31
2017	Jeux de la Francophonie	Abidjan, Ivory Coast	1st	400 m hurdles	57.38
2017	Jeux de la Francophonie	Abidjan, Ivory Coast	5th	4 × 100 m relay	46.31

=== National ===
- French Championships in Athletics :
  - winner of the 400m hurdles in 2015; 2nd in 2014

== Records ==
Personal Bests
Event	Performance	Location	Date
400 hurdles	56.03	Villeneuve-d'Ascq	12 July 2015
