= Hanami Sekine =

Japanese long-distance runner

Personal information
- Born: 26 February 1996 (age 30) Tokyo, Japan
- Height: 1.56 m (5 ft 1 in)
- Weight: 43 kg (95 lb)

Sport
- Country: Japan

Achievements and titles
- Personal best: 10,000 m: 31:22.92 min

Hanami Sekine (関根 花観 (Sekine Hanami); born 26 February 1996) is a Japanese female long-distance runner who competes in track events. She competed for Japan at the 2016 Rio Olympics.

Born in Tokyo, Sekine showed her promise for distance running by winning a leg at the Inter-Prefectural Women's Ekiden as a junior high school athlete. Her first international medal came over 3000 metres at the 2014 Asian Junior Athletics Championships, where she was silver medallist behind Kyrgyz athlete Darya Maslova. She continued to perform well in national ekiden competitions, winning her stage at the Inter-Prefectural race in 2014 and 2016, and coming runner-up at the All-Japan Women's Corporate Ekiden Championships in 2015.

Sekine showed much improvement on the track in the 2016 season and at the 2016 Japan Championships in Athletics she set a personal best of 31:22.92 minutes to take second behind Ayuko Suzuki in the 10,000 metres, then placed third in the 5000 metres with another best of 15:24.74 minutes. She was chosen to represent Japan at the 2016 Summer Olympics over the longer distance. At the competition she was near the top of the field in the opening stages, but fell away as the leading pack took on a world record pace. She finished 20th, two places behind national rival Yuka Takashima.

== Personal bests ==
- 3000 metres – 9:06.97 min (2013)
- 5000 metres – 15:24.74 min (2016)
- 10,000 metres – 31:22.92 min (2016)

== International competitions ==
Year	Competition	Venue	Position	Event	Notes
2014	Asian Junior Championships	Taipei, Taiwan	2nd	3000 m	9:17.55
2016	Olympic Games	Rio de Janeiro, Brazil	20th	10,000 m	31:44.44
