= Vera Rudakova =

Russian hurdler (born 1992)

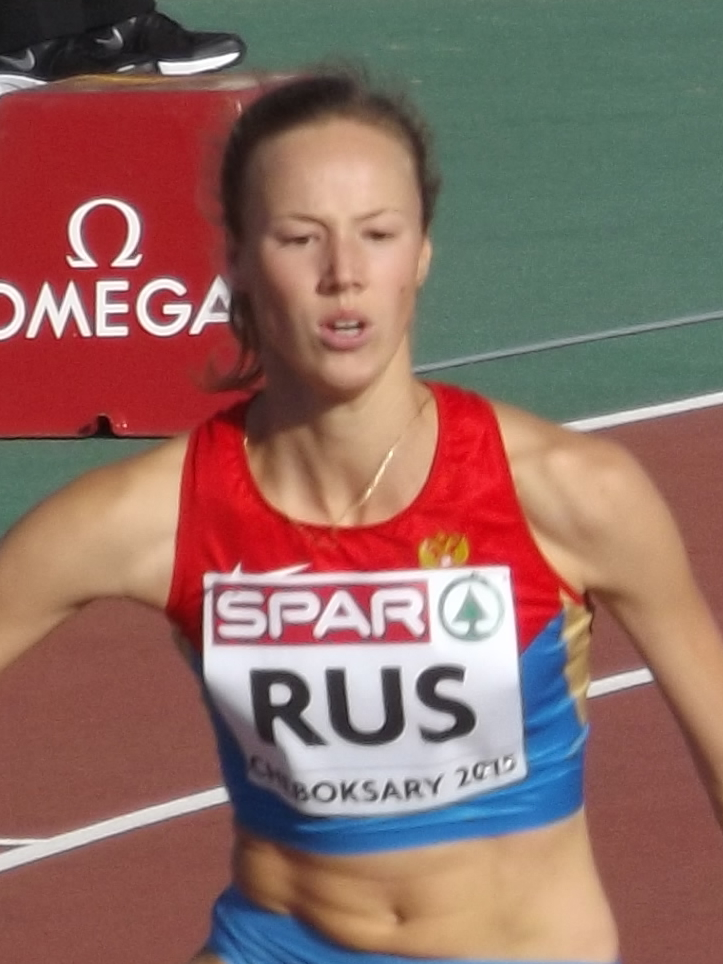
- Vera Rudakova at the 2015 European Team Championships

Personal information
- Full name: Vera Viktorovna Rudakova
- Born: 20 March 1992 (age 34)

Sport
- Country: Russia
- Sport: Track and field
- Event: 400 m hurdles

Vera Viktorovna Rudakova (Russian: Вера Викторовна Рудакова; born 20 March 1992) is a Russian athlete who specialises in the 400 metres hurdles. She won several titles for her country in various junior categories. She reached her first major final at the 2014 European Championships finishing sixth.

Her personal best in the event is 54.42, set in Moscow 2016.

== International competitions ==
Representing Russia
Year	Competition	Venue	Position	Event	Notes
2009	World Youth Championships	Brixen, Italy	1st	400 m hurdles	57.83
2009	European Youth Olympics	Tampere, Finland	1st	400 m hurdles	58.01
2010	World Junior Championships	Moncton, Canada	1st	400 m hurdles	57.16
2010	World Junior Championships	Moncton, Canada	6th	4 × 400 m relay	3:36.94
2011	European Junior Championships	Tallinn, Estonia	1st	400 m hurdles	57.24
2013	European U23 Championships	Tampere, Finland	1st	400 m hurdles	55.92
2014	European Championships	Zürich, Switzerland	6th	400 m hurdles	56.22
2015	World Championships	Beijing, China	19th (sf)	400 m hurdles	56.38
Competing as Authorised Neutral Athlete
2018	European Championships	Berlin, Germany	6th	400 m hurdles	55.89
2019	World Championships	Doha, Qatar	18th (sf)	400 m hurdles	55.57
