= 2014 World Junior Championships in Athletics – Women's long jump =

The women's long jump event at the 2014 World Junior Championships in Athletics was held in Eugene, Oregon, USA, at Hayward Field on 22 and 23 July.

== Medalists ==
Gold	Akela Jones; Barbados
Silver	Nadia Akpana Assa; Norway
Bronze	Maryse Luzolo; Germany

== Results ==
=== Final ===
23 July
Start time: 19:03 Temperature: 18 °C Humidity: 56 %
End time: 20:35 Temperature: 17 °C Humidity: 63 %

Rank	Name	Nationality	Attempts						Result	Notes
Rank	Name	Nationality	1	2	3	4	5	6	Result	Notes
1st place, gold medalist(s)	Akela Jones	Barbados	6.32 (w: -1.6 m/s)	6.34 (w: -2.7 m/s)	x (w: +0.7 m/s)	6.20 (w: -2.7 m/s)	6.20 (w: -1.9 m/s)	6.31 (w: -1.6 m/s)	6.34 (w: -2.7 m/s)	
2nd place, silver medalist(s)	Nadia Akpana Assa	Norway	6.22 (w: -0.5 m/s)	6.31 (w: -0.4 m/s)	x (w: -0.8 m/s)	x (w: -0.9 m/s)	5.97 (w: -2.8 m/s)	6.20 (w: -1.2 m/s)	6.31 (w: -0.4 m/s)	
3rd place, bronze medalist(s)	Maryse Luzolo	Germany	6.24 (w: -1.5 m/s)	6.17 (w: -2.3 m/s)	5.97 (w: -1.0 m/s)	x (w: -1.1 m/s)	6.06 (w: -1.7 m/s)	6.04 (w: -1.2 m/s)	6.24 (w: -1.5 m/s)	
4	Jogailė Petrokaitė	Lithuania	6.08 (w: -1.7 m/s)	6.11 (w: -1.5 m/s)	6.08 (w: -1.4 m/s)	6.13 (w: -2.6 m/s)	6.08 (w: -2.8 m/s)	x (w: -1.3 m/s)	6.13 (w: -2.6 m/s)	
5	Quanesha Burks	United States	6.04 (w: +0.9 m/s)	5.46 (w: -3.0 m/s)	5.87 (w: -2.0 m/s)	5.64 (w: -3.0 m/s)	5.63 (w: -1.8 m/s)	6.04 (w: -1.2 m/s)	6.04 (w: -1.2 m/s)	
6	Jazmin McCoy	United States	6.01 (w: -0.4 m/s)	5.88 (w: +1.5 m/s)	x (w: -1.8 m/s)	5.65 (w: -1.4 m/s)	5.62 (w: -2.9 m/s)	5.70 (w: -2.4 m/s)	6.01 (w: -0.4 m/s)	
7	Rougui Sow	France	5.91 (w: -0.8 m/s)	5.98 (w: -1.8 m/s)	5.90 (w: -1.8 m/s)	5.75 (w: -2.3 m/s)	5.76 (w: -1.8 m/s)	x (w: -1.1 m/s)	5.98 (w: -1.8 m/s)	
8	Elise Malmberg	Sweden	5.95 (w: 0.0 m/s)	5.80 (w: -2.3 m/s)	5.86 (w: -1.5 m/s)	5.78 (w: -2.0 m/s)	5.83 (w: -2.3 m/s)	5.78 (w: -1.8 m/s)	5.95 (w: 0.0 m/s)	
9	Maryna Bekh	Ukraine	5.95 (w: -1.8 m/s)	5.84 (w: -2.2 m/s)	x (w: +1.4 m/s)				5.95 (w: -1.8 m/s)	
10	Génesis Romero	Venezuela	5.88 (w: -2.6 m/s)	x (w: -1.3 m/s)	5.87 (w: -1.1 m/s)				5.88 (w: -2.6 m/s)	
11	Yulimar Rojas	Venezuela	5.81 (w: -0.3 m/s)	5.64 (w: -0.6 m/s)	5.72 (w: -0.5 m/s)				5.81 (w: -0.3 m/s)	
12	Martha Traoré	Denmark	x (w: -1.7 m/s)	5.78 (w: -0.3 m/s)	x (w: -2.4 m/s)				5.78 (w: -0.3 m/s)	

=== Qualifications ===
22 July
With qualifying standard of 6.30 (Q) or at least the 12 best performers (q) advance to the Final

==== Summary ====
Rank	Name	Nationality	Result	Notes
1	Nadia Akpana Assa	Norway	6.39 (w: +1.3 m/s)	Q NJR
2	Akela Jones	Barbados	6.32 (w: -1.1 m/s)	Q
3	Jogailė Petrokaitė	Lithuania	6.30 (w: -0.2 m/s)	Q
4	Rougui Sow	France	6.19 (w: -0.5 m/s)	q
5	Jazmin McCoy	United States	6.18 (w: +1.3 m/s)	q
6	Génesis Romero	Venezuela	6.17 (w: +1.0 m/s)	q
7	Maryse Luzolo	Germany	6.15 (w: +1.0 m/s)	q
8	Martha Traoré	Denmark	6.14 (w: +0.3 m/s)	q
9	Quanesha Burks	United States	6.12 (w: +0.1 m/s)	q
10	Yulimar Rojas	Venezuela	6.05 (w: +0.8 m/s)	q
11	Elise Malmberg	Sweden	6.04 (w: +0.8 m/s)	q
12	Maryna Bekh	Ukraine	6.03 (w: +1.0 m/s)	q
13	Audrey Kyriacou	Australia	6.02 (w: +0.2 m/s)	
14	Anna Bühler	Germany	6.00 (w: +1.3 m/s)	
15	Fátima Diame	Spain	6.00 (w: +0.5 m/s)	
16	Teresa Carvalho	Portugal	5.97 (w: -1.3 m/s)	
17	Naa Anang	Australia	5.97 (w: -1.3 m/s)	
18	Claudette Allen	Jamaica	5.97 (w: -0.6 m/s)	
19	Zinzi Chabangu	South Africa	5.95 (w: -0.7 m/s)	
20	Annastacia Forrester	Jamaica	5.87 (w: +0.1 m/s)	
21	Mari Dzagnidze	Georgia	5.84 (w: +1.9 m/s)	
22	Paola Borović	Croatia	5.83 (w: -1.1 m/s)	
23	Kristal Liburd	Saint Kitts and Nevis	5.82 (w: +0.8 m/s)	
24	Yumi Uchinokura	Japan	5.77 (w: +0.7 m/s)	
25	Li Xiaohong	China	5.72 (w: +0.5 m/s)	
26	Cora Salas	Spain	5.72 (w: +0.1 m/s)	
27	Filippa Fotopoulou	Cyprus	5.72 (w: -1.0 m/s)	
28	Janaina Fernandes	Brazil	5.71 (w: -0.3 m/s)	
29	Satenik Hovhannisyan	Armenia	5.66 (w: +0.4 m/s)	
30	Lucinda Gomes	Portugal	5.61 (w: +0.4 m/s)	
31	Wang Rong	China	5.52 w (w: +2.3 m/s)	
32	Carla Johnson	South Africa	5.50 (w: +0.5 m/s)	
33	Ese Brume	Nigeria	5.18 (w: -0.3 m/s)	
	Dannielle Gibson	Bahamas	NM	

==== Details ====
With qualifying standard of 6.30 (Q) or at least the 12 best performers (q) advance to the Final

===== Group A =====
23 July
Start time; 18:45 Temperature: 27 °C Humidity: 39 %
End time: 19:54 Temperature: 26 °C Humidity: 42 %

Rank	Name	Nationality	Attempts			Result	Notes
Rank	Name	Nationality	1	2	3	Result	Notes
1	Jogailė Petrokaitė	Lithuania	x (w: +0.3 m/s)	x (w: -0.1 m/s)	6.30 (w: -0.2 m/s)	6.30 (w: -0.2 m/s)	Q
2	Jazmin McCoy	United States	6.18 (w: +0.1 m/s)	6.18 (w: +1.3 m/s)	6.07 (w: +1.1 m/s)	6.18 (w: 1.3 m/s)	q
3	Martha Traoré	Denmark	6.14 (w: +0.3 m/s)	5.72 (w: -1.0 m/s)	6.00 (w: -0.8 m/s)	6.14 (w: 0.3 m/s)	q
4	Yulimar Rojas	Venezuela	5.81 (w: +0.2 m/s)	6.05 (w: +0.8 m/s)	5.83 (w: +0.9 m/s)	6.05 (w: 0.8 m/s)	q
5	Elise Malmberg	Sweden	6.04 (w: +0.8 m/s)	5.82 (w: +0.3 m/s)	5.90 (w: +0.1 m/s)	6.04 (w: 0.8 m/s)	q
6	Maryna Bekh	Ukraine	5.87 (w: -0.2 m/s)	6.03 (w: +1.0 m/s)	5.98 (w: +0.2 m/s)	6.03 (w: 1.0 m/s)	q
7	Audrey Kyriacou	Australia	5.79 (w: -0.2 m/s)	x (w: +0.1 m/s)	6.02 (w: +0.2 m/s)	6.02 (w: 0.2 m/s)	
8	Anna Bühler	Germany	5.85 (w: +0.2 m/s)	6.00 (w: +1.3 m/s)	5.96 (w: +0.4 m/s)	6.00 (w: 1.3 m/s)	
9	Fátima Diame	Spain	5.67 (w: +0.2 m/s)	6.00 (w: +0.5 m/s)	5.91 (w: -0.6 m/s)	6.00 (w: 0.5 m/s)	
10	Claudette Allen	Jamaica	x (w: +1.5 m/s)	5.97 (w: -0.6 m/s)	x (w: +1.0 m/s)	5.97 (w: -0.6 m/s)	
11	Zinzi Chabangu	South Africa	x (w: -0.6 m/s)	x (w: +0.5 m/s)	5.95 (w: -0.7 m/s)	5.95 (w: -0.7 m/s)	
12	Mari Dzagnidze	Georgia	5.78 (w: +0.1 m/s)	5.84 (w: +1.9 m/s)	5.58 (w: +0.1 m/s)	5.84 (w: 1.9 m/s)	
13	Paola Borović	Croatia	x (w: +0.8 m/s)	x (w: +1.1 m/s)	5.83 (w: -1.1 m/s)	5.83 (w: -1.1 m/s)	
14	Satenik Hovhannisyan	Armenia	5.66 (w: +0.4 m/s)	5.64 (w: -0.3 m/s)	x (w: m/s)	5.66 (w: 0.4 m/s)	
15	Lucinda Gomes	Portugal	x (w: +0.6 m/s)	5.46 (w: +0.4 m/s)	5.61 (w: m/s)	5.61 (w: 0.4 m/s)	
16	Wang Rong	China	5.49 (w: -0.1 m/s)	5.52 w (w: +2.3 m/s)	5.45 (w: +0.4 m/s)	5.52 w (w: 2.3 m/s)	
17	Ese Brume	Nigeria	x w (w: +2.2 m/s)	x (w: +1.7 m/s)	5.18 (w: -0.3 m/s)	5.18 (w: -0.3 m/s)	

===== Group B =====
23 July
Start time; 18:45 Temperature: 27 °C Humidity: 39 %
End time: 19:59 Temperature: 26 °C Humidity: 42 %

Rank	Name	Nationality	Attempts			Result	Notes
Rank	Name	Nationality	1	2	3	Result	Notes
1	Nadia Akpana Assa	Norway	4.76 (w: +0.4 m/s)	6.39 (w: +1.3 m/s)		6.39 (w: 1.3 m/s)	Q NJR
2	Akela Jones	Barbados	6.18 (w: +1.6 m/s)	6.08 (w: -0.5 m/s)	6.32 (w: -1.1 m/s)	6.32 (w: -1.1 m/s)	Q
3	Rougui Sow	France	5.80 (w: -0.1 m/s)	6.19 (w: -0.5 m/s)	x (w: -1.1 m/s)	6.19 (w: -0.5 m/s)	q
4	Génesis Romero	Venezuela	5.96 (w: 0.0 m/s)	6.17 (w: +1.0 m/s)	5.94 (w: -0.8 m/s)	6.17 (w: 1.0 m/s)	q
5	Maryse Luzolo	Germany	6.15 (w: +1.0 m/s)	x (w: -0.3 m/s)	6.05 (w: +1.0 m/s)	6.15 (w: 1.0 m/s)	q
6	Quanesha Burks	United States	5.81 (w: +0.5 m/s)	6.12 (w: +0.1 m/s)	5.85 (w: -1.8 m/s)	6.12 (w: 0.1 m/s)	q
7	Teresa Carvalho	Portugal	5.78 (w: +1.3 m/s)	x (w: +0.8 m/s)	5.97 (w: -1.3 m/s)	5.97 (w: -1.3 m/s)	
8	Naa Anang	Australia	x (w: +0.6 m/s)	5.76 (w: -0.7 m/s)	5.97 (w: -1.3 m/s)	5.97 (w: -1.3 m/s)	
9	Annastacia Forrester	Jamaica	5.70 (w: -0.3 m/s)	5.87 (w: +0.1 m/s)	5.61 (w: -0.1 m/s)	5.87 (w: 0.1 m/s)	
10	Kristal Liburd	Saint Kitts and Nevis	5.80 (w: +0.5 m/s)	5.82 (w: +0.8 m/s)	5.49 (w: -1.6 m/s)	5.82 (w: 0.8 m/s)	
11	Yumi Uchinokura	Japan	x (w: -0.4 m/s)	x (w: +0.6 m/s)	5.77 (w: +0.7 m/s)	5.77 (w: 0.7 m/s)	
12	Li Xiaohong	China	5.51 (w: -0.4 m/s)	5.72 (w: +0.5 m/s)	5.67 (w: -1.6 m/s)	5.72 (w: 0.5 m/s)	
13	Cora Salas	Spain	5.72 (w: +0.1 m/s)	x (w: -0.7 m/s)	5.66 (w: -0.3 m/s)	5.72 (w: 0.1 m/s)	
14	Filippa Fotopoulou	Cyprus	5.72 (w: -1.0 m/s)	x (w: +0.8 m/s)	5.61 (w: -1.6 m/s)	5.72 (w: -1.0 m/s)	
15	Janaina Fernandes	Brazil	5.71 (w: -0.3 m/s)	5.46 (w: +1.4 m/s)	5.59 (w: -0.4 m/s)	5.71 (w: -0.3 m/s)	
16	Carla Johnson	South Africa	5.50 (w: +0.5 m/s)	x (w: +0.4 m/s)	4.35 (w: -1.1 m/s)	5.50 (w: 0.5 m/s)	
	Dannielle Gibson	Bahamas	x (w: -0.7 m/s)	x (w: +0.4 m/s)	x (w: -0.7 m/s)	NM	

== Participation ==
According to an unofficial count, 34 athletes from 25 countries participated in the event.

- Armenia (1)
- Australia (2)
- Bahamas (1)
- Barbados (1)
- Brazil (1)
- China (2)
- Croatia (1)
- Cyprus (1)
- Denmark (1)
- France (1)
- Georgia (1)
- Germany (2)
- Jamaica (2)
- Japan (1)
- Lithuania (1)
- Nigeria (1)
- Norway (1)
- Portugal (2)
- Saint Kitts and Nevis (1)
- South Africa (2)
- Spain (2)
- Sweden (1)
- Ukraine (1)
- United States (2)
- Venezuela (2)
