= Emilia Ankiewicz =

Polish hurdler (born 1990)

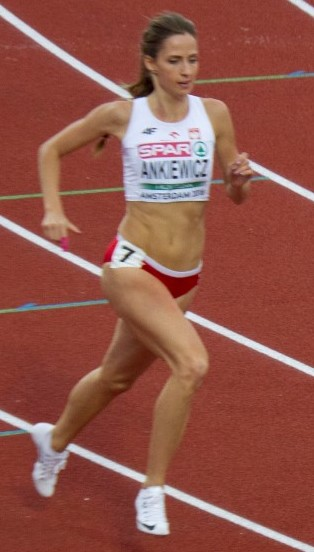
- Emilia Ankiewicz in 2016

Personal information
- Born: 22 November 1990 (age 35) Elbląg, Poland
- Education: Academy of Physical Education in Warsaw
- Height: 1.78 m (5 ft 10 in)
- Weight: 64 kg (141 lb)

Sport
- Sport: Track and field
- Event: 400 metres hurdles
- Club: AZS-AWF Warszawa
- Coached by: Andrzej Wołkowycki
Medal record
Women's athletics
Representing Poland
Universiade
Silver medal – second place	2015 Gwangju	400 metres hurdles

Emilia Ankiewicz (Polish pronunciation: [ɛˈmilja anˈkjɛvit͡ʂ]; born 22 November 1990 in Elbląg) is a Polish athlete specialising in the 400 metres hurdles. She won the silver medal at the 2015 Summer Universiade. In addition, she made the final at the 2016 European Championships finishing eighth.

== Competition record ==
Representing Poland
Year	Competition	Venue	Position	Event	Notes
2015	Universiade	Gwangju, South Korea	2nd	400 m hurdles	56.66
2016	European Championships	Amsterdam, Netherlands	8th	400 m hurdles	57.31
2016	Olympic Games	Rio de Janeiro, Brazil	23rd (sf)	400 m hurdles	56.99

== Personal bests ==
- 400 metres hurdles – 55.89 (Rio de Janeiro 2016)
