= Stina Troest =

Danish hurdler (born 1994)

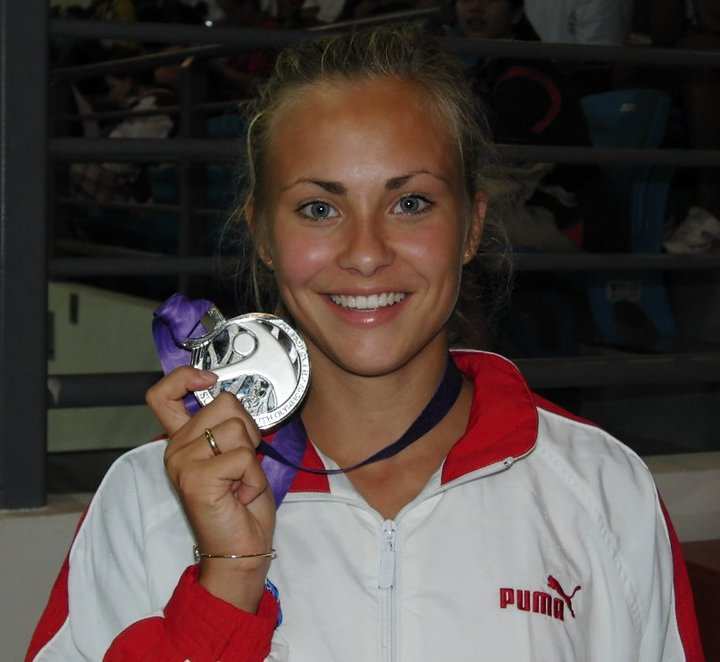
- Stina Troest in 2011

Personal information
- Nationality: Danish
- Born: 17 January 1994 (age 32) Copenhagen
- Height: 1.70 m (5 ft 7 in)
- Weight: 59 kg (130 lb)

Sport
- Country: Denmark
- Sport: Hurdling
- Team: Amager Atletik Club
- Coached by: Anita Sølyst

Achievements and titles
- Olympic finals: Youth Olympic Games
Medal record
Women's athletics
Representing Denmark
Summer Youth Olympics
Silver medal – second place	2010 Singapore	400 m hurdles

Stina Troest (born 17 January 1994) is a Danish hurdler. She ran the 400 meter hurdles at the Youth Olympic Games in Singapore 2010 and won silver.

Stina Troest has been practicing athletics since she started "mini athletics" (3-7 year olds) at Amager AC at the age of 3, which her mother started there in 1998. She still coaches her daughter in hurdles.

== Competition record ==
Year	Competition	Venue	Position	Event	Notes
Representing the Denmark
2010	Youth Olympic Games	Singapore	2nd	400 m hurdles	58.88
2013	European Junior Championships	Rieti, Italy	3rd	400 m hurdles	57.41
2014	World Indoor Championships	Sopot, Poland	11th (h)	800 m	2:02.95
2014	European Championships	Zürich, Switzerland	12th (sf)	400 m hurdles	56.81
2015	European U23 Championships	Tallinn, Estonia	2nd	400 m hurdles	56.01
2015	World Championships	Beijing, China	15th (sf)	400 m hurdles	56.13
2016	European Championships	Amsterdam, Netherlands	7th	400 m hurdles	56.34
2016	Olympic Games	Rio de Janeiro, Brazil	15th (sf)	400 m hurdles	56.00
2017	European Indoor Championships	Belgrade, Serbia	5th	800 m	2:02.93
