= Maryse Luzolo =

German long jumper (born 1995)

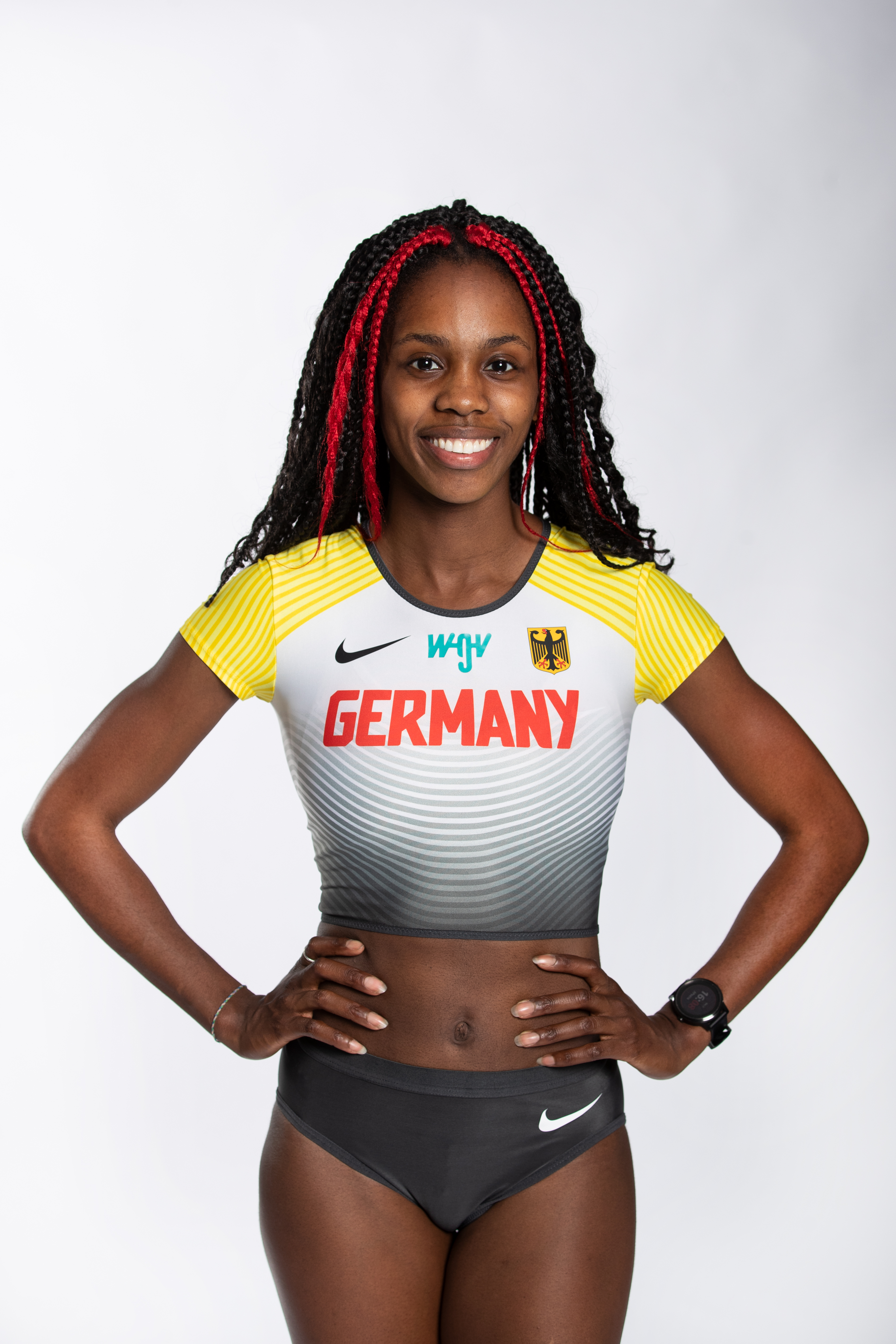

Personal information
- Nationality: German
- Born: Maryse Luzolo; 15 March 1995 (age 31) Frankfurt

Sport
- Sport: Track and Field
- Event: Long jump

Maryse Luzolo (born 15 March 1995) is a German long jumper. She competed for Germany at the 2020 Olympic Games and 2023 World Athletics Championships. She became national champion at the German Athletics Championships in 2024.

== Early and personal life ==
She was born and raised in Frankfurt to parents from the Democratic Republic of the Congo. She attended the Carl von Weinberg School in Frankfurt. She began as member of the German Armed Forces in 2016. In 2018, she started studying sports and geography at the Goethe University in Frankfurt.

== Career ==
At the age of 18 years-old, she set a long jump personal best of 6.45 metres. Luzolo won the bronze medal at the 2014 World Junior Athletics Championships. In 2017, aged 21 years-old she extended her lifetime best to 6.61m. She won the 2017 German U23 title with 6.57m, but three days later she suffered a serious knee injury to her left knee- multiple tears to the cruciate ligaments and joint capsule caused by incorrectly adjusted training equipment.

In December 2019, she won the silver medal at the World Military Championship in Wuhan, China. It was her first international competition after two and a half years.

She won the long jump title at the European Athletics Team Championships in 2021 and subsequently competed as a member l of the Germany Olympic Team at the delayed 2020 Summer Games in Tokyo.

In May 2023, she jumped a wind assisted 6.79 metres (+2.5 m/ps) whilst competing in Yokohama, Japan. She finished ninth in the final of the 2023 World Athletics Championships long jump competition in Budapest.

She became German long jump champion in June 2024 at the German Athletics Championships in Braunschweig.

=== Retirement ===
In 2026, she returned to competition, recording a wind-legal 6.21m (+1.0m/s) in Dessau on 19 June. In late August 2026, after fifteen years in the sport, she announced her retirement from competitive athletics and was farewelled at an official ceremony at the Olympic training centre in Frankfurt-Niederrad, with Malaika Mihambo among the guests.
