= Li Xiaohong (athlete) =

Chinese triple jumper (born 1995)

Personal information
- Born: 8 January 1995 (age 31) Fujian, China
- Height: 1.62 m (5 ft 4 in)
- Weight: 48 kg (106 lb)

Sport
- Country: China
- Sport: Track and field
- Event: Triple jump
Medal record
Women's athletics
Representing China
Asian Indoor Championships
Bronze medal – third place	2014 Hangzhou	Triple jump

Li Xiaohong (Chinese: 李小红；born 8 January 1995) is a Chinese female triple jumper.

She competed in the Women's triple jump event at the 2015 World Championships in Athletics in Beijing, China. The following year she competed in the 2016 Olympics.

Her personal bests in the event are 14.20 metres outdoors (+1.6 m/s, Chanthaburi 2015) and 14.06 metres indoors (Nanjing 2013). She set her personal best in the long jump of 6.27m while winning the 2014 Asian Junior Athletics Championships.

== Competition record ==
Year	Competition	Venue	Position	Event	Notes
Representing China
2013	Asian Championships	Pune, India	4th	Triple jump	13.57 m
2014	Asian Indoor Championships	Hangzhou, China	3rd	Triple jump	13.43 m
2014	Asian Junior Championships	Taipei City, Taiwan	1st	Long jump	6.27 m
2014	Asian Junior Championships	Taipei City, Taiwan	2nd	Triple jump	13.62 m
2014	World Junior Championships	Eugene, United States	25th (q)	Long jump	5.72 m
2014	World Junior Championships	Eugene, United States	3rd	Triple jump	14.03 m
2015	World Championships	Beijing, China	21st (q)	Triple jump	13.52 m
2016	Asian Indoor Championships	Hangzhou, China	5th	Triple jump	13.14 m
2016	Olympic Games	Rio de Janeiro, Brazil	34th (q)	Triple jump	13.30 m
