= Lucia Vadlejch =

Slovak heptathlete

Lucia Slaničková-Vadlejch
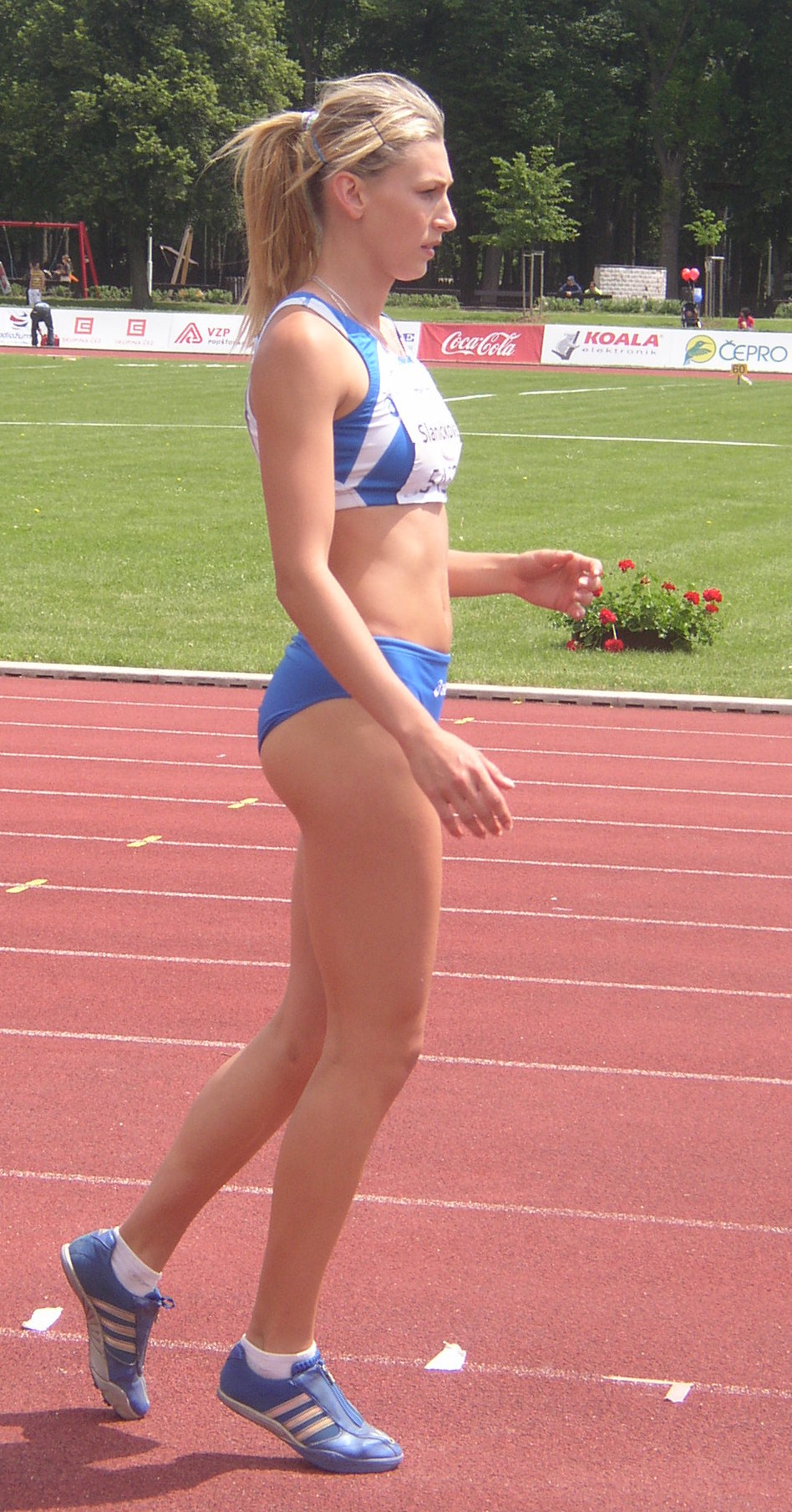
- Slaničková in 2010

Personal information
- Full name: Lucia Slaničková
- Born: 8 November 1988 (age 37) Považská Bystrica, Czechoslovakia
- Height: 1.79 m (5 ft 10 in)

Sport
- Country: Slovakia
- Sport: Athletics
- Event: Heptathlon

Achievements and titles
- World finals: 6th at the 2005 World Youth Championships (400 m hurdles)
- Personal bests: 200 m: 24.99; 800 m: 2:13.69; 100 m hurdles: 14.25; 400 m hurdles: 56.96; High jump: 1.75; Long jump: 6.37; Shot put: 11.72; Javelin: 42.69; Heptathlon: 5780
Medal record
Women's athletics
Representing Slovakia
European Games
| Gold medal – first place | 2015 Baku | Mixed team |

Lucia Slaničková-Vadlejch (born 8 November 1988) is a Slovak retired athlete who specialises in the heptathlon.

Slaničková currently holds the national indoor record for the 4 × 400 metres relay.

== International competitions ==
| Year | Competition | Venue | Position | Event | Notes |
Representing Slovakia
| 2005 | World Youth Championships | Marrakesh, Morocco | 20th (h) | 400 m hurdles | 63.19 |
| 2007 | European Junior Championships | Hengelo, Netherlands | 13th (sf) | 400 m hurdles | 60.40 |
| 2014 | European Championships | Zurich, Switzerland | 18th (h) | 400 m hurdles | 57.56 |
| 2015 | European Indoor Championships | Prague, Czech Republic | 18th (q) | Long jump | 6.17 m |
| 2015 | Universiade | Gwangju, South Korea | 12th (h) | 400 m hurdles | 58.92 |
| 2015 | Universiade | Gwangju, South Korea | 5th | 4 × 100 m relay | 46.01 |
| 2016 | European Championships | Amsterdam, Netherlands | 23rd (sf) | 400 m hurdles | 57.86 |
| 2017 | European Indoor Championships | Belgrade, Serbia | 9th | Pentathlon | 4409 pts |
