= 2014 Asian Junior Athletics Championships =

Youth athletics tournament

- Dates: 12–15 June
- Host city: Taipei, Republic of China
- Venue: Taipei Municipal Stadium
- Level: Junior (under-20)
- Events: 44
- Participation: ? athletes from 24 nations
- Records set: 3 Championship records

The 2014 Asian Junior Athletics Championships was the 16th edition of the international athletics competition for Asian under-20 athletes, organised by the Asian Athletics Association and the Chinese Taipei Track & Field Association. Events were held at Taipei Municipal Stadium in Taipei, Republic of China from 12–15 June. A total of 44 events were contested, with the events being evenly split between the sexes.

China narrowly beat Japan to extend its long-running undefeated streak at the competition. China had the most gold medals with twelve and also the highest tally with 24. Japan won eleven events and gathered 21 medals. Qatar had the next most gold medals, with six, while the hosts Chinese Taipei had the third highest medal total at 15. Twenty-two of the participating nations reached the medal table; Pakistan and Oman were the only participants not to medal. China had particular success in the jumps, winning all such events on both the men's and women's programmes. Qatar won no women's medals, but its male athletes won at all distances from 400 metres to 5000 metres.

Three championship records were broken at the event. Iran's men's 200 metres winner Mohammadhossein Abareghi set a championship record of 20.63 seconds in the first round of the event. Oanh Nguyen Thi of Vietnam broke the women's 3000 metres steeplechase with 10:27.29 seconds (nearly twenty seconds ahead of the runner-up). All three medallists in the men's 110 metres hurdles were under the previous record mark, but Japan's Taio Kanai was still clear above the field in 13.33 seconds.

Some of the top performing athletes will go on to compete at the 2014 World Junior Championships in Athletics. Ashraf Amgad Elseify added the global title to his Asian men's hammer crown. Men's long jumper Shotaro Shiroyama and women's shot putter Navjeet Kaur Dhillon repeated their bronze medallist placings there. Li Xiaohong, women's triple jump runner-up, also took the bronze in Eugene, Oregon.

After the competition, Shahin Mehrdelan, Iran's original winner in the men's shot put, was disqualified after failing his post-event doping test. Shahin Jafari, another Iranian, was elevated to the gold medal.

== Medal summary ==
=== Men ===
Event	Gold		Silver		Bronze	
100 metres	Takuya Kawakami; Japan	10.47	Himasha Eashan; Sri Lanka	10.49	Mohammadhossein Abareghi; Iran	10.50
200 metres	Mohammadhossein Abareghi; Iran	20.69^{[nb1]}	Liang Jingsheng; China	20.96	Katsumi Hiyoshi; Japan	21.05
400 metres	Mohamed Nasir Abbas; Qatar	47.31	Mazen Al-Yasen; Saudi Arabia	47.40	Sina Rohanimoayed; Iran	47.50
800 metres	Mohamed Elnour Mohamed; Qatar	1:52.73	Gao Dongxu; China	1:53.25	Mustafa Al-Elayawi; Iraq	1:53.31
1500 metres	Idriss Moussa Youssouf; Qatar	3:53.36	Abubaker Haydar Abdalla; Qatar	3:54.74	Gao Dongxu; China	3:56.11
5000 metres	Musaab Adam Ali; Qatar	14:34.07	Makoto Mitsunobu; Japan	14:38.99	Sharwan Kharb; India	14:39.41
10,000 metres	Hazuma Hattori; Japan	31:10.60	Sharwan Kharb; India	31:52.37	Yaser Salem Bagharab; Yemen	32:22.42
110 metres hurdles	Taio Kanai; Japan	13.33 CR	Masahiro Kagimoto; Japan	13.51	Mohammad Amin Barzi Ghamsari; Iran	13.56
400 metres hurdles	Yu Chia-Hsuan; Chinese Taipei	50.49	Wang Guozhong; China	50.61	Yusuke Sakanashi; Japan	50.76
3000 metres steeplechase	Musaab Adam M Ali; Qatar	9:02.80	Takumi Murashima; Japan	9:03.35	Khalil Naseri; Iran	9:03.54
4×100 metres relay	Japan (JPN); Takuya Kawakami; Masaharu Mori; Katsumi Hiyoshi; Rei Tokuyama	39.49	Thailand (THA); Teerasak Sunthanon; Kacha Sawangyen; Natthawut Chuchuai; Pooriphat Kaijun	39.74	Chinese Taipei (TPE); Cheng Po-Yu; Li Hsiang; Huang Shu-Wei; Yang Chun-Han	39.91
4×400 metres relay	Thailand (THA); Jaturong Chimruang; Witthawat Thumcha; Treenate Krittanukulwong; Vitsanu Phosri	3:08.89	Iran (IRI); Javad Shooryabi; Mohammad Cheshmehzarkordestani; Mohammad Sababkar; Sina Rohanimoayed	3:09.61	Qatar (QAT); Mohamed Nasir Abbas; Abubaker Haydar Abdalla; Khalid Mohammed Al-Shahrani; Mohamed Elnour Mohamed	3:09.89
10,000 m walk	Fumitaka Oikawa; Japan	44:08.2	Lo Po-Ying; Chinese Taipei	45:51.62	Chang Wei-Lin; Chinese Taipei	46:14.69
High jump	Bai Jiaxu; China	2.10 m	Roman Loshkarev; Kazakhstan	2.08 m	Aryan Zarekani; Iran	2.08 m
Pole vault	Huang Bokai; China	5.25 m	Park Taewon; South Korea	4.90 m	Jhang Rihhao; Chinese Taipei	4.90 m
Long jump	Lin Qing; China	7.99 m	Chan Ming Tai; Hong Kong	7.70 m	Shotaro Shiroyama; Japan	7.70 m
Triple jump	Fang Yaoqing; China	16.32 m	Supot Boonnun; Thailand	15.59 m	Timur Khusnulin; Uzbekistan	15.55 m
Shot put^{[nb2]}	Shahin Jafari; Iran	18.64 m	Shakti Solanki; India	17.09 m	Artyom Davletov; Uzbekistan	16.63 m
Discus throw	Mustafa Dagher Al-Saamah; Iraq	59.35 m	Yang Jingkai; China	57.49 m	Muhammad Irfan Shamshuddin; Malaysia	56.07 m
Hammer throw	Ashraf Amgad Elseify; Qatar	79.71 m	Ahmed Amgad Elseify; Qatar	68.90 m	Abdurauf Musoev; Tajikistan	68.35 m
Javelin throw	Hsu Shui-Chang; Chinese Taipei	67.24 m	Kim Woo-jung; South Korea	66.15 m	Piyasiri Intaprasong; Thailand	66.08 m
Decathlon	Wang Chen-Yuan; Chinese Taipei	6566 pts	Lien Hung-Yu; Chinese Taipei	5920 pts	Leung Xavier Anthony; Hong Kong	5687 pts

- ^{nb1} Iran's men's 200 metres winner Mohammadhossein Abareghi set a championship record of 20.63 seconds in the first round of the event, but was a little slower in the final.
- ^{nb2} Iran's men's shot-put winner Shahin Mehrdelan got disqualified after failing in doping control test in the championships. Minor medallists Shahin Jafari (Iran) and Shakti Solanki (India) were promoted to the gold and silver medals while fourth placer Artyom Davletov (Uzbekistan) was given the bronze medal.

=== Women ===
Event	Gold		Silver		Bronze	
100 metres	Liang Xiaojing; China	11.58	Yuan Qiqi; China	11.64	Shanti Veronica Pereira; Singapore	11.79
200 metres	Dutee Chand; India	23.74	Shanti Veronica Pereira; Singapore	23.99	Nigina Sharipova; Uzbekistan	24.24
400 metres	Siti Nur Afiqah Abd Razak; Malaysia	53.93	Liliya Manasipova; Uzbekistan	54.11	Ngoc Hoang Thi; Vietnam	55.36
800 metres	Ryoko Hirano; Japan	2:06.75	Jessy Joseph; India	2:06.77	Archana Adhav; India	2:09.11
1500 metres	O Song Mi; North Korea	4:28.38	Yuki Nakamura; Japan	4:28.75	Xu Shuangshuang; China	4:28.78
3000 metres	Daria Maslova; Kyrgyzstan	9:16.23	Hanami Sekine; Japan	9:17.55	Sanjivini Jadhav; India	9:35.02
5000 metres	Maki Izumida; Japan Daria Maslova; Kyrgyzstan	16:18.35	Not awarded		Kim Ji Hyang; North Korea	16:28.13
100 metres hurdles	Mako Fukube; Japan	13.98	Meghana Shetty; India	14.09	Wong Min Jannah; Singapore	14.14
400 metres hurdles	Akiko Ito; Japan	58.80	Kawshalya Madushani Edirippulilage; Sri Lanka	62.31	Alvin Tehupeiory; Indonesia	62.39
3000 metres steeplechase	Oanh Nguyen Thi; Vietnam	10:27.29 CR	Ju Ok Byol; North Korea	10:45.41	Jang Un Hwa; North Korea	10:55.51
4×100 metres relay	China (CHN); Wang Rong; Cui Yanan; Liang Xiaojing; Yuan Qiqi	45.34	Thailand (THA); Sirilak Palapha; Parichat Charoensuk; Wanwisa Kongthong; On-Uma Chattha	45.89	Chinese Taipei (TPE); Chuang Hsin-Ju; Lin Yi-Ting; Wang Yu-Hsuan; Hu Chia-Chen	45.94
4×400 metres relay	India (IND); Jisha V.V. Jessy Joseph; Vijaya Kumari G.K; Dutee Chand	3:40.53	Thailand (THA); Supanich Poolkerd; Nawaporn Saekhow; Chamaiphon Thongsuk; Thanphimon Kaeodi	3:42.27	Chinese Taipei (TPE); Pan Pei-Yu; Lin Yen-Tong; Lu Yi-Hsuan; Lin Yu-Chieh	3:43.00
10,000 m walk	Kaori Kawazoe; Japan	50:38.05	Diana Aidossova; Kazakhstan	51:39.77	Dana Aidossova; Kazakhstan	52:13.42
High jump	Wang Lin; China	1.88 m	Lee Ching-Ching; Chinese Taipei	1.75 m	Nadia Anggraini; Indonesia	1.72 m
Pole vault	Li Chaoqun; China	4.05 m	Yang Yang; China	4.00 m	Megumi Mizushima; Japan	3.80 m
Long jump	Li Xiaohong; China	6.27 m	Wang Rong; China	6.15 m	Wen Wan-Ju; Chinese Taipei	5.89 m
Triple jump	Wang Rong; China	13.64 m	Li Xiaohong; China	13.62 m	Vidusha Lakshani Heenatimullage Dona; Sri Lanka	12.87 m
Shot put	Xu Jiaqi; China	16.50 m	Wang Ningyue; China	15.05 m	Navjeet Kaur Dhillon; India	14.99 m
Discus throw	Xie Yuchen; China	55.65 m	Navjeet Kaur Dhillon; India	53.66 m	Natsumi Fujimori; Japan	46.16 m
Hammer throw	Hung Hsiu-Wen; Chinese Taipei	56.81 m	Panwat Gimsrang; Thailand	54.66 m	Diana Nussupbekova; Kazakhstan	53.81 m
Javelin throw	Shiori Touma; Japan	55.75 m	Kang Qiyan; China	51.97 m	Chang Chu; Chinese Taipei	50.45 m
Heptathlon	Kotchakorn Khamrueangsri; Thailand	5290 pts	Swapana Barman; India	4962 pts	Tsao Ya-Han; Chinese Taipei	4806 pts

== 2014 Medal table ==
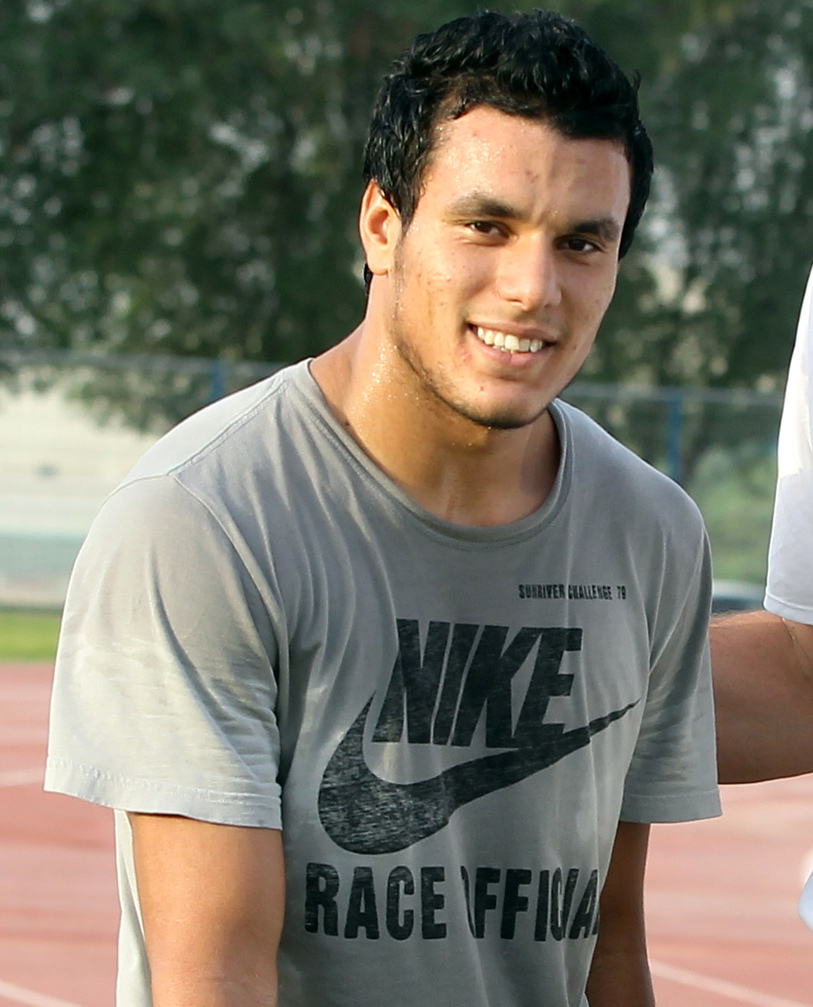
Egyptian-born Ashraf Amgad Elseify won the men's hammer for Qatar

* Host nation (Chinese Taipei)

Rank	Nation	Gold	Silver	Bronze	Total
1	China	12	10	2	24
2	Japan	11	5	5	21
3	Qatar	6	2	1	9
4	Chinese Taipei*	4	3	8	15
5	India	2	6	4	12
6	Thailand	2	5	1	8
7	Iran	2	1	5	8
8	Kyrgyzstan	2	0	0	2
9	North Korea	1	1	2	4
10	Iraq	1	0	1	2
10	Malaysia	1	0	1	2
10	Vietnam	1	0	1	2
13	Kazakhstan	0	2	2	4
14	Sri Lanka	0	2	1	3
15	South Korea	0	2	0	2
16	Uzbekistan	0	1	3	4
17	Singapore	0	1	2	3
18	Hong Kong	0	1	1	2
19	Saudi Arabia	0	1	0	1
20	Indonesia	0	0	2	2
21	Tajikistan	0	0	1	1
21	Yemen	0	0	1	1
Totals (22 entries)		45	43	44	132

== Participation ==
- China
- Hong Kong
- India
- Indonesia
- Iran
- Iraq
- Japan
- Kazakhstan
- Kyrgyzstan
- Malaysia
- North Korea
- Oman
- Pakistan
- Qatar
- Saudi Arabia
- Singapore
- South Korea
- Sri Lanka
- Tajikistan
- Thailand
- Chinese Taipei
- Uzbekistan
- Vietnam
- Yemen

== See also ==
- List of sporting events in Taiwan
