= Aurélie Chaboudez =

French hurdler

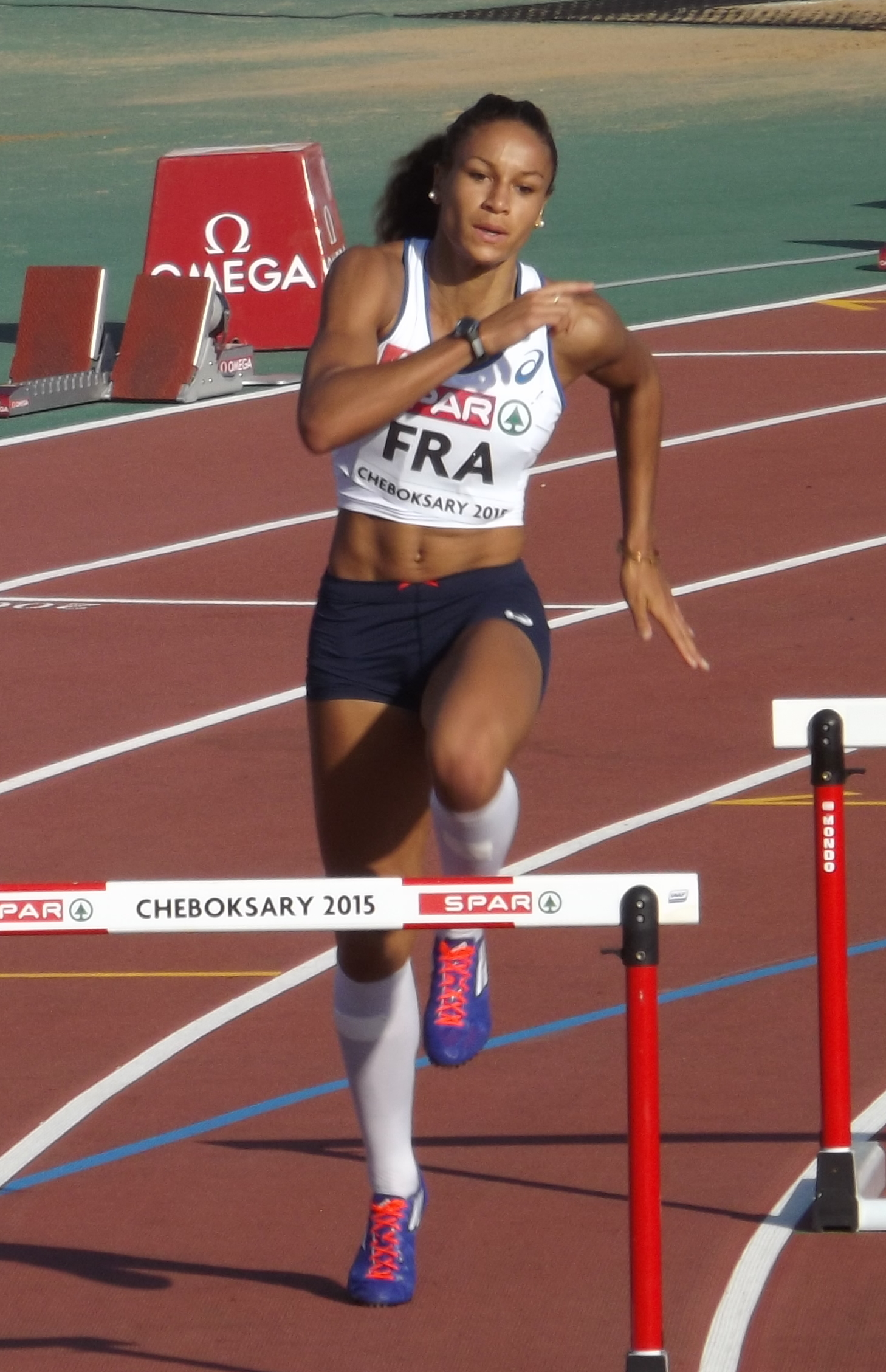
- Chaboudez at the 2015 European Team Championships

Personal information
- Born: 9 May 1993 (age 33) Montbéliard, France
- Height: 173 cm (5 ft 8 in)
- Weight: 57 kg (126 lb)

Sport
- Sport: Track and field
- Event: 400 metres hurdles
- Club: Montbéliard Belfort Athlétisme
- Coached by: Bruno Gajer

Aurélie Chaboudez (born 9 May 1993) is a French athlete specialising in the 400 metres hurdles. She represented her country at the 2015 World Championships in Beijing, reaching the semifinals. She was the first French athlete to attain this level of competition. Her personal best in the event is 55.51 set in Marseille in 2015.

== International competitions ==
Year	Competition	Venue	Position	Event	Result
Representing France
2010	Youth Olympic Games	Singapore	1st	400 m hurdles	58.41
2011	European Junior Championships	Tallinn, Estonia	2nd	400 m hurdles	57.35
2011	European Junior Championships	Tallinn, Estonia	5th	4 × 400 m relay	3:37.57
2012	World Junior Championships	Barcelona, Spain	2nd	400 m hurdles	57.14
2013	European U23 Championships	Tampere, Finland	4th	400 m hurdles	57.13
2015	European U23 Championships	Tallinn, Estonia	3rd	400 m hurdles	56.04
2015	European U23 Championships	Tallinn, Estonia	–	4 × 400 m relay	DQ
2015	World Championships	Beijing, China	16th (sf)	400 m hurdles	56.13
2016	European Championships	Amsterdam, Netherlands	20th (sf)	400 m hurdles	57.50
2018	Mediterranean Games	Tarragona, Spain	3rd	400 m hurdle	56.77
2018	European Championships	Berlin, Germany	15th (sf)	400 m hurdles	56.19

=== Personal bests ===
Chaboudez personal records
Event	Performance	Location	Date
400 metres hurdles	55.51 sec	France (Marseille)	6 June 2015
Heptathlon	5,660 pts	France (Albi)	29 July 2011
