= Robine Schürmann =

Swiss hurdler

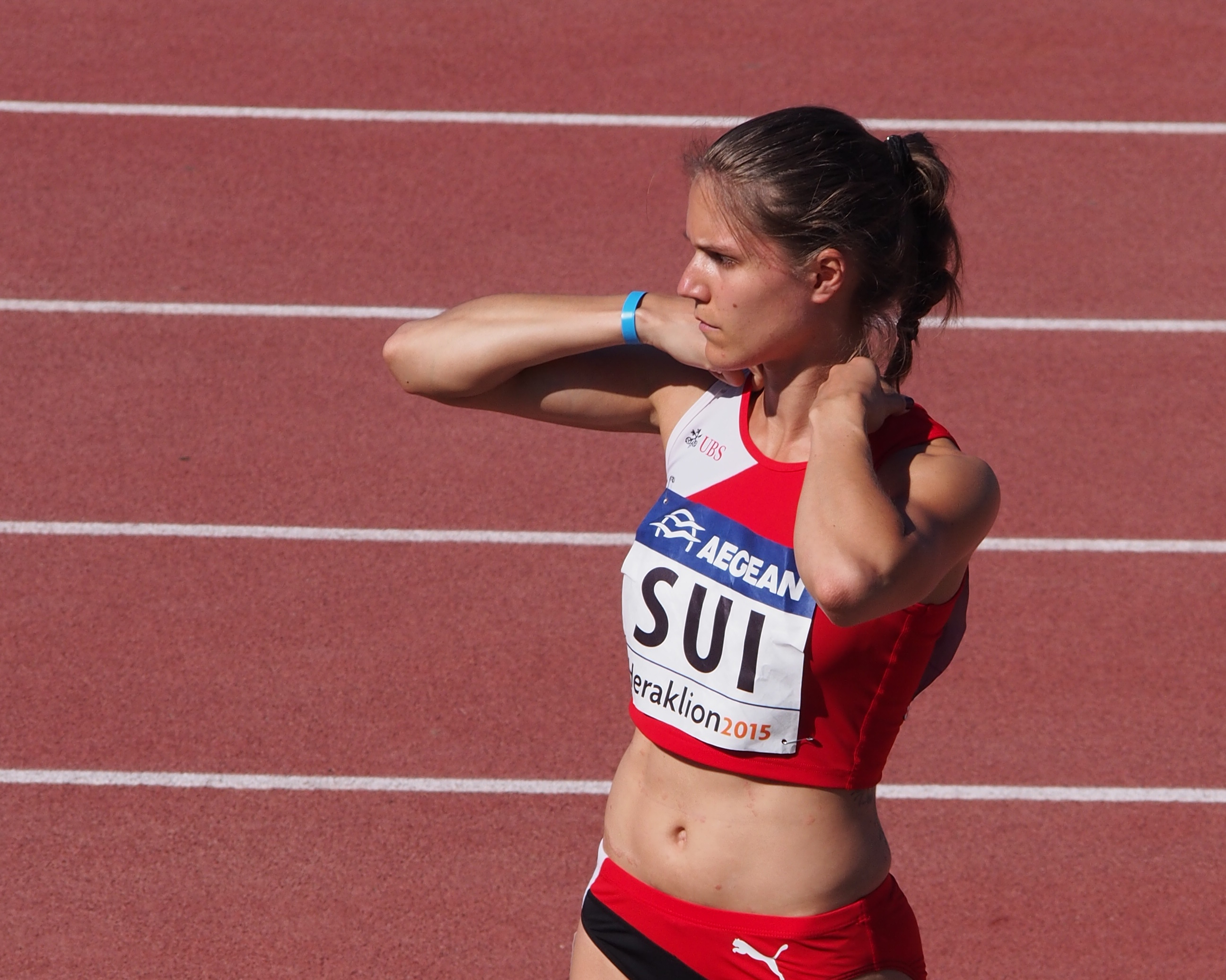
- Robine Schürmann in 2015

Personal information
- Born: 31 January 1989 (age 36)
- Height: 1.65 m (5 ft 5 in)
- Weight: 56 kg (123 lb)

Sport
- Sport: Athletics
- Event: 400 m hurdles
- Club: Leichtathletik Club Zürich

Robine Schürmann (born 31 January 1989) is a Swiss athlete specialising in the 400 metres hurdles. She represented her country at three consecutive European Championships.

Her personal best in the event is 55.53 seconds set in Basel in 2018.

== International competitions ==
Year	Competition	Venue	Position	Event	Notes
Representing Switzerland
2014	European Championships	Zürich, Switzerland	2 1st(h)	400 m hurdles	58.16
2015	Universiade	Gwangju, South Korea	7th	400 m	57.92
2016	European Championships	Amsterdam, Netherlands	15th (h)	400 m hurdles	57.91
2018	European Championships	Berlin, Germany	12th (sf)	400 m hurdles	55.89
2018	European Championships	Berlin, Germany	10th (h)	4 × 400 m relay	3:32.86
