= Christine McMahon =

Irish hurdler

Personal information
- Born: 6 July 1992 (age 33) Belfast, Northern Ireland, United Kingdom

Sport
- Sport: Athletics
- Event: 400 metres hurdles

Christine McMahon (born 6 July 1992) is an Irish athlete specialising in the 400 metres. She represented Northern Ireland at the 2010 and 2014 Commonwealth Games.

Her personal best in the event is 56.06 seconds set in Heusden-Zolder in 2016.

== International competitions ==
Year	Competition	Venue	Position	Event	Notes
Representing Ireland and Northern Ireland
2009	European Youth Olympic Festival	Tampere, Finland	2nd	400 m hurdles	59.55
2009	European Youth Olympic Festival	Tampere, Finland	3rd	4 × 100 m relay	46.56
2010	Commonwealth Games	Delhi, India	11th (h)	400 m hurdles	61.27
2010	Commonwealth Games	Delhi, India	10th (h)	4 × 400 m relay	3:40.92
2010	World Junior Championships	Moncton, Canada	10th (h)	400 m hurdles	60.19
2014	Commonwealth Games	Glasgow, United Kingdom	15th (h)	400 m hurdles	58.67
2014	European Championships	Zürich, Switzerland	15th (sf)	400 m hurdles	57.31
2016	European Championships	Amsterdam, Netherlands	15th (sf)	400 m hurdles	56.87
