= Bianca Baak =

Dutch middle-distance runner

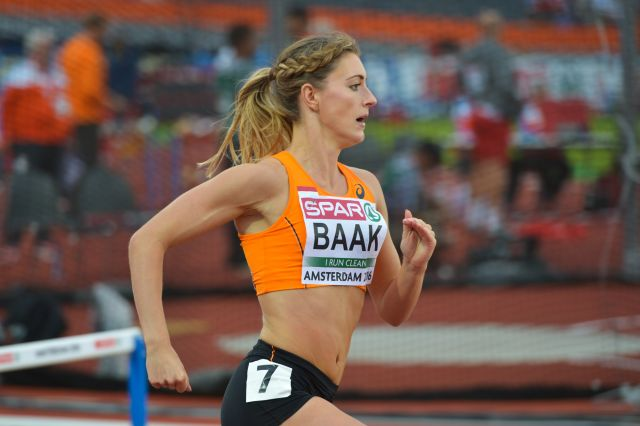

Personal information
- Nationality: Dutch
- Born: 25 January 1992 (age 33) Almere, Netherlands

Sport
- Sport: Track and field
- Event: 400 metres

Bianca Baak (Dutch: [biˈjɑnkaː ˈbaːk]; born 25 January 1992) is a Dutch track and field athlete who specializes in middle-distance running. She represented Netherlands at the 2019 World Athletics Championships, competing in women's 4 × 400 metres relay.
