= Katsiaryna Belanovich =

Belarusian hurdler

Katsiaryna Belanovich (née Artsiukh; born October 14, 1991) is a Belarusian hurdler. She competed at the 2016 Summer Olympics in the women's 400 metres hurdles race; her time of 56.55 seconds in the heats did not qualify her for the semifinals.

She originally won a won gold medal at the 2010 World Junior Championships in Athletics, but was subsequently disqualified for doping.

== See also ==
- List of doping cases in athletics
