= Athletics at the 2015 African Games – Women's 4 × 400 metres relay =

The women's 4 × 400 metres relay event at the 2015 African Games was held on 17 September.

== Results ==
Rank	Nation	Athletes	Time	Notes
1st place, gold medalist(s)	Nigeria	Rita Ossai, Funke Oladoye, Tosin Adeloye, Patience Okon George	3:27.12	
2nd place, silver medalist(s)	Botswana	Lydia Jele, Goitseone Seleka, Galefele Moroko, Christine Botlogetswe	3:32.84	
3rd place, bronze medalist(s)	Kenya	Hellen Syombua, Annet Mwanzi, Winnie Chebet, Maureen Nyatichi	3:35.91	
4	Ethiopia	Tegest Tamagnu, Kore Tola, Nema Sefa, Chaltu Shume	3:39.99	
5	Congo	Sarah Nguet, Ruth Okounikala, Duval Moliba, Natacha Ngoye Akamabi	3:49.46	NR
	Cameroon	Marie Jaine Eba, Irene Bell Bonong, Germaine Abessolo Bivina, Audrey Nkamsao	DQ	
	Sudan		DNS	
