= Athletics at the 2018 Commonwealth Games – Women's 400 metres =

Women's 400 metres at the 2018 Commonwealth Games
- Venue: Carrara Stadium
- Dates: 9 April (heats); 10 April (semifinals); 11 April (final)
- Competitors: 39 from 21 nations
- Winning time: 50.15

Medalists
gold medal	Amantle Montsho	Botswana
silver medal	Anastasia Le-Roy	Jamaica
bronze medal	Stephenie Ann McPherson	Jamaica

The women's 400 metres at the 2018 Commonwealth Games, as part of the athletics programme, took place in the Carrara Stadium between 9 and 11 April 2018.

== Records ==
Prior to this competition, the existing world and Games records were as follows:

World record	Marita Koch (GDR)	47.60	Canberra, Australia	6 October 1985
Games record	Amantle Montsho (BOT)	50.10	Delhi, India	8 October 2010

== Schedule ==
The schedule was as follows:

Date	Time	Round
Monday 9 April 2018	10:30	First round
Tuesday 10 April 2018	21:16	Semifinals
Wednesday 11 April 2018	21:45	Final

All times are Australian Eastern Standard Time (UTC+10)

== Results ==
=== First round ===
The first round consisted of five heats. The four fastest competitors per heat (plus four fastest losers) advanced to the semifinals.

Heat 1

Rank	Lane	Name	Reaction Time	Result	Notes	Qual.
1	2	Amantle Montsho (BOT)	0.163	51.20		Q
2	5	Anastasia Le-Roy (JAM)	0.166	51.37	SB	Q
3	1	Emily Diamond (ENG)	0.167	52.26		Q
4	4	Quincy Malekani (ZAM)	0.145	52.40		Q
5	3	Poovamma Raju Machettira (IND)	0.175	53.72		
6	6	Dolly Mustapha (SLE)	0.248	55.26		
7	7	Artesha Richardson (AIA)	0.140	58.43		
–	8	Samantha Dirks (BIZ)		DNS		

Heat 2

Rank	Lane	Name	Reaction Time	Result	Notes	Qual.
1	5	Stephenie Ann McPherson (JAM)	0.138	50.80		Q
2	8	Zoey Clark (SCO)	0.157	52.07		Q
3	7	Akua Obeng-Akrofi (GHA)	0.142	52.44	PB	Q
4	6	Leni Shida (UGA)	0.231	52.79		Q
5	4	Anyika Onuora (ENG)	0.169	53.13		q
6	2	Gladys Musyoki (KEN)	0.200	53.41	PB	q
–	3	Folasade Abugan (NGR)	0.261	DQ	R 163.3a	

Heat 3

Rank	Lane	Name	Reaction Time	Result	Notes	Qual.
1	3	Maximila Imali (KEN)	0.190	51.74		Q
2	4	Tovea Jenkins (JAM)	0.204	52.58		Q
3	2	Eleni Artymata (CYP)	0.217	52.90		Q
4	5	Kanika Beckles (GRN)	0.197	53.34		Q
5	8	Rafiatu Nuhu (GHA)	0.241	54.02		
6	6	Bendere Oboya (AUS)		55.62		
7	1	Najma Parveen (PAK)	0.171	57.12	SB	
8	7	Roslyn Nalin (VAN)	0.160	1:00.72		

Heat 4

Rank	Lane	Name	Reaction Time	Result	Notes	Qual.
1	8	Anneliese Rubie (AUS)	0.149	52.32		Q
2	3	Galefele Moroko (BOT)	0.218	53.28	PB	Q
3	1	Ashley Kelly (IVB)	0.188	53.45		Q
4	4	Emily Nanziri (UGA)	0.201	54.10	SB	Q
5	5	Mariama Conteh (SLE)	0.267	56.66		
6	7	Elenani Tinai (FIJ)	0.262	57.45	PB	
7	2	Valentine Hello (VAN)	0.183	58.62	PB	
–	6	Patience Okon George (NGR)	0.206	DQ	R 163.3a	

Heat 5

Rank	Lane	Name	Reaction Time	Result	Notes	Qual.
1	4	Yinka Ajayi (NGR)	0.198	51.71		Q
2	2	Christine Botlogetswe (BOT)	0.211	51.73	PB	Q
3	6	Hima Das (IND)	0.165	52.11		Q
4	5	Veronica Kamumbe Mutua (KEN)	0.179	52.70		Q
5	1	Morgan Mitchell (AUS)	0.153	52.81		q
6	3	Kineke Alexander (SVG)	0.191	53.63		q
7	8	Scovia Ayikoru (UGA)	0.188	54.65		
8	7	Miriama Senokonoko (FIJ)	0.313	58.31		

=== Semifinals ===
Three semi-finals were held. The two fastest competitors per semi (plus two fastest losers) advanced to the final.

Semifinal 1

Rank	Lane	Name	Reaction Time	Result	Notes	Qual.
1	5	Anastasia Le-Roy (JAM)	0.175	51.08	SB	Q
2	3	Amantle Montsho (BOT)	0.174	51.26		Q
3	6	Hima Das (IND)	0.157	51.53	PB	q
4	4	Zoey Clark (SCO)	0.152	52.06		
5	7	Eleni Artymata (CYP)	0.227	52.38		
6	2	Emily Nanziri (UGA)	0.166	54.10	=SB	
7	1	Kineke Alexander (SVG)	0.151	54.35		
8	8	Veronica Kamumbe Mutua (KEN)	0.182	54.85		

Semifinal 2

Rank	Lane	Name	Reaction Time	Result	Notes	Qual.
1	3	Maximila Imali (KEN)	0.212	51.52		Q
2	5	Yinka Ajayi (NGR)	0.217	51.81		Q
3	2	Morgan Mitchell (AUS)	0.139	52.65		
4	1	Anyika Onuora (ENG)	0.153	52.73		
5	8	Ashley Kelly (IVB)	0.174	53.00		
6	4	Galefele Moroko (BOT)	0.202	54.27		
7	7	Quincy Malekani (ZAM)	0.153	54.36		
–	6	Tovea Jenkins (JAM)		DNS		

Semifinal 3

Rank	Lane	Name	Reaction Time	Result	Notes	Qual.
1	5	Stephenie Ann McPherson (JAM)	0.140	51.21		Q
2	6	Christine Botlogetswe (BOT)	0.210	51.41	PB	Q
3	4	Anneliese Rubie (AUS)	0.142	51.51	PB	q
4	3	Emily Diamond (ENG)	0.161	52.02		
5	7	Akua Obeng-Akrofi (GHA)	0.161	53.16		
6	1	Kanika Beckles (GRN)	0.157	53.80		
7	2	Gladys Musyoki (KEN)	0.219	54.40		
8	8	Leni Shida (UGA)	0.247	54.50		

=== Final ===
The medals were determined in the final.

Rank	Lane	Name	Reaction Time	Result	Notes
1st place, gold medalist(s)	6	Amantle Montsho (BOT)	0.222	50.15	SB
2nd place, silver medalist(s)	3	Anastasia Le-Roy (JAM)	0.159	50.57	PB
3rd place, bronze medalist(s)	5	Stephenie Ann McPherson (JAM)	0.137	50.93	
4	8	Christine Botlogetswe (BOT)	0.222	51.17	PB
5	4	Maximila Imali (KEN)	0.207	51.32	
6	1	Hima Das (IND)	0.154	51.32	PB
7	2	Anneliese Rubie (AUS)	0.165	52.03	
8	7	Yinka Ajayi (NGR)	0.233	52.26	
