= 2016 African Championships in Athletics – Women's 4 × 400 metres relay =

The women's 4 × 400 metres relay event at the 2016 African Championships in Athletics was held on 26 June in Kings Park Stadium.

== Results ==
Rank	Nation	Competitors	Time	Notes
1st place, gold medalist(s)	South Africa	Jeanelle Griesel, Wenda Nel, Justine Palframan, Caster Semenya	3:28.49	CR, NR
2nd place, silver medalist(s)	Nigeria	Omolara Omotosho, Regina George, Yinka Ajayi, Patience Okon George	3:29.94	
3rd place, bronze medalist(s)	Kenya	Jacinta Shikanda, Maureen Jelagat, Maureen Thomas, Margaret Wambui	3:30.21	
4	Botswana	Christine Botlogetswe, Lydia Jele, Galefele Moroko, Goitseone Seleka	3:31.54	
5	Ghana	Agnes Abrocqua, Shawkia Iddrisu, Bless Dupeh, Akua Obeng-Akrofi	3:40.09	
	Cameroon		DNS	
