= 2016 African Championships in Athletics – Women's 400 metres =

The women's 400 metres event at the 2016 African Championships in Athletics was held on 22, 23 and 24 June in Kings Park Stadium.

== Medalists ==
Gold	Silver	Bronze
Kabange Mupopo; Zambia	Margaret Wambui; Kenya	Patience Okon George; Nigeria

== Results ==
=== Heats ===
Qualification: First 3 of each heat (Q) and the next 4 fastest (q) qualified for the semifinals.

Rank	Heat	Name	Nationality	Time	Notes
1	2	Patience Okon George	Nigeria	51.84	Q
2	1	Kabange Mupopo	Zambia	52.11	Q
3	3	Margaret Wambui	Kenya	52.27	Q
4	2	Regina George	Nigeria	52.67	Q
5	1	Maureen Thomas	Kenya	53.12	Q
5	4	Lydia Jele	Botswana	53.12	Q
7	3	Christine Botlogetswe	Botswana	53.16	Q
8	1	Tegest Tamagnu	Ethiopia	53.18	Q
9	3	Yinka Ajayi	Nigeria	53.32	Q
10	1	Leni Shida	Uganda	53.49	q
11	4	Djénébou Danté	Mali	53.70	Q
12	2	Goitseone Seleka	Botswana	53.84	Q
13	4	Fatoumata Diop	Senegal	53.93	Q
14	1	Akua Obeng-Akrofi	Ghana	53.95	q
15	2	Jeanelle Griesel	South Africa	54.20	q
16	4	Vivian Mills	Ghana	54.79	q
17	2	Aurélie Alcindor	Mauritius	54.93	
18	3	Zoe Engler	South Africa	55.93	
19	1	Tsitsi Mahachi	Zimbabwe	56.03	
20	3	Mariama Mamoudou	Niger	57.36	
21	4	Hellen Syombua	Kenya	58.29	
22	3	Suzan Bumanga	South Sudan	1:03.93	
	2	Agnes Abrocquah	Ghana	DQ	
	4	Zinash Tesfaye	Ethiopia	DNF	
	1	Viola Lado	South Sudan	DNS	
	1	Mireille Tshakwiza	Democratic Republic of the Congo	DNS	
	2	Margret Hassan	South Sudan	DNS	
	3	Natacha Ngoye Akamabi	Republic of the Congo	DNS	
	4	Amal Mohamed Bashir	Somalia	DNS	

=== Semifinals ===
Qualification: First 3 of each heat (Q) and the next 2 fastest (q) qualified for the final.

Rank	Heat	Name	Nationality	Time	Notes
1	2	Margaret Wambui	Kenya	51.97	Q
2	2	Kabange Mupopo	Zambia	52.05	Q
3	1	Patience Okon George	Nigeria	52.42	Q
4	2	Lydia Jele	Botswana	52.51	Q
5	2	Djénébou Danté	Mali	52.72	q
6	1	Regina George	Nigeria	52.89	Q
7	1	Christine Botlogetswe	Botswana	52.89	Q
8	2	Leni Shida	Uganda	52.96	q
9	1	Maureen Thomas	Kenya	53.17	
10	1	Fatoumata Diop	Senegal	53.31	
11	2	Yinka Ajayi	Nigeria	53.54	
12	2	Vivian Mills	Ghana	53.87	
13	1	Tegest Tamagnu	Ethiopia	53.97	
14	2	Jeanelle Griesel	South Africa	54.37	
15	1	Goitseone Seleka	Botswana	54.41	
16	1	Akua Obeng-Akrofi	Ghana	54.49	

=== Final ===
Rank	Lane	Athlete	Nationality	Time	Notes
1st place, gold medalist(s)	4	Kabange Mupopo	Zambia	51.56	
2nd place, silver medalist(s)	3	Margaret Wambui	Kenya	52.24	
3rd place, bronze medalist(s)	5	Patience Okon George	Nigeria	52.33	
4	6	Lydia Jele	Botswana	52.41	
5	8	Djénébou Danté	Mali	52.65	
6	2	Christine Botlogetswe	Botswana	53.31	
7	7	Regina George	Nigeria	53.45	
8	1	Leni Shida	Uganda	53.91	
