= Athletics at the 2013 Summer Universiade – Women's 400 metres =

The women's 400 metres event at the 2013 Summer Universiade was held on 7–9 July.

== Medalists ==
Gold	Silver	Bronze
Kseniya Ustalova; Russia	Alena Tamkova; Russia	Anastasia Le-Roy; Jamaica

== Results ==
=== Heats ===
Qualification: First 3 in each heat and 4 best performers advance to the Semifinals.

Rank	Heat	Name	Nationality	Time	Notes
1	4	Kseniya Ustalova	Russia	52.98	Q
2	1	Aauri Lorena Bokesa	Spain	52.99	Q
3	2	Anastasia Le-Roy	Jamaica	53.33	Q
4	4	Briana Nelson	United States	53.35	Q
5	1	Lydia Mashila	Botswana	53.37	Q
6	3	Alena Tamkova	Russia	53.46	Q
7	2	Jitka Bartoničková	Czech Republic	53.57	Q
8	1	Caitlin Sargent	Australia	53.60	Q
9	2	Olesea Cojuhari	Moldova	53.66	Q
10	4	Sonja van der Merwe	South Africa	53.67	Q
11	4	Yuliya Baraley	Ukraine	53.81	q
12	3	Alicia Brown	Canada	53.86	Q
13	3	Elena Bonfanti	Italy	53.88	Q
14	2	Agata Bednarek	Poland	53.93	q
15	1	Fatoumata Diop	Senegal	54.02	q
16	4	Liona Rebernik	Slovenia	54.51	q
17	2	Justine Palframan	South Africa	55.43	
18	1	Helin Meier	Estonia	55.85	PB
19	3	Desire Bermudez	Costa Rica	56.71	
20	2	Elisabeth Mandaba	Central African Republic	58.35	NR
21	2	Leong Ka Man	Macau	58.48	PB
22	3	Inese Nagle	Latvia	59.09	
23	4	Iao Si Teng	Macau	1:01.98	
	1	Salamatu Kamara	Sierra Leone	DNS	
	1	Regina George	Nigeria	DNS	
	3	Viktoriya Pyatachenko	Ukraine	DNS	
	3	Ikabongo Ikabongo	Zambia	DNS	
	3	Patience Okon George	Nigeria	DNS	
	4	Isha Sesay	Sierra Leone	DNS	

=== Semifinals ===
Qualification: First 3 in each heat and 2 best performers advance to the Finals.

Rank	Heat	Name	Nationality	Time	Notes
1	1	Kseniya Ustalova	Russia	51.71	Q
2	1	Anastasia Le-Roy	Jamaica	52.14	Q
3	1	Caitlin Sargent	Australia	52.16	Q, PB
4	2	Alena Tamkova	Russia	52.30	Q
5	2	Aauri Lorena Bokesa	Spain	52.38	Q
6	1	Alicia Brown	Canada	52.46	q, PB
7	1	Elena Bonfanti	Italy	52.66	q, SB
8	2	Olesea Cojuhari	Moldova	52.81	Q
9	1	Briana Nelson	United States	53.08	
10	1	Yuliya Baraley	Ukraine	53.50	
11	2	Jitka Bartoničková	Czech Republic	53.57	
12	2	Lydia Mashila	Botswana	53.57	
13	2	Agata Bednarek	Poland	53.71	
14	1	Liona Rebernik	Slovenia	53.97	
15	2	Fatoumata Diop	Senegal	55.19	
	2	Sonja van der Merwe	South Africa	DQ	

=== Final ===
Rank	Lane	Name	Nationality	Time	Notes
1st place, gold medalist(s)	6	Kseniya Ustalova	Russia	50.60	SB
2nd place, silver medalist(s)	4	Alena Tamkova	Russia	51.17	PB
3rd place, bronze medalist(s)	3	Anastasia Le-Roy	Jamaica	51.72	
4	5	Aauri Lorena Bokesa	Spain	52.04	PB
5	2	Alicia Brown	Canada	52.08	PB
6	8	Caitlin Sargent	Australia	52.40	
7	1	Elena Bonfanti	Italy	52.99	
8	7	Olesea Cojuhari	Moldova	53.44	
