= Athletics at the 2015 African Games – Women's 400 metres =

The women's 400 metres event at the 2015 African Games was held between 13 and 15 September.

== Medalists ==
Gold	Silver	Bronze
Kabange Mupopo; Zambia	Patience Okon George; Nigeria	Tjipekapora Herunga; Namibia

== Results ==
=== Heats ===
Qualification: First 3 in each heat (Q) and the next 4 fastest (q) advanced to the semifinals.

Rank	Heat	Name	Nationality	Time	Notes
1	1	Kabange Mupopo	Zambia	51.19	Q
2	1	Tosin Adeloye	Nigeria	51.86	Q
2	2	Lydia Jele	Botswana	52.86	Q
4	3	Patience Okon George	Nigeria	52.87	Q
5	3	Djénébou Danté	Mali	52.97	Q
6	1	Leni Shida	Uganda	53.00	Q
7	1	Fatoumata Diop	Senegal	53.07	q
8	1	Phumlile Ndzinisa	Swaziland	53.14	q
9	2	Margaret Etim	Nigeria	53.18	Q
10	1	Goitseone Seleka	Botswana	53.27	q
11	4	Tjipekapora Herunga	Namibia	53.40	Q
12	3	Justine Palframan	South Africa	53.56	Q
13	4	Maureen Nyatichi	Kenya	53.87	Q
14	2	Hellen Syombua	Kenya	53.88	Q
15	3	Christine Botlogetswe	Botswana	54.30	q
16	3	Rhoda Njobvu	Zambia	54.35	
17	3	Natacha Ngoye Akamabi	Republic of the Congo	54.91	
18	3	Tegest Tamagnu	Ethiopia	55.59	
19	4	Audrey Nkamsao	Cameroon	56.26	Q
20	2	Nema Sefa	Ethiopia	56.96	
21	4	Mariama Conteh	Sierra Leone	57.15	
22	2	Sarah Nguet	Republic of the Congo	57.72	
23	4	Saoudatou Touré	Guinea	58.64	
24	1	Medihb Gebremariam	Ethiopia	58.65	
25	4	Mireille Tshakwiza	DR Congo	59.92	
26	2	Nawal El Jack	Sudan	1:01.51	
27	4	Suzan Loui Saleh Bamanga	South Sudan	1:05.69	
28	2	Maryam Nuh Muse	Somalia	1:09.83	

=== Semifinals ===
Qualification: First 3 in each semifinal (Q) and the next 2 fastest (q) advanced to the final.

Rank	Heat	Name	Nationality	Time	Notes
1	2	Kabange Mupopo	Zambia	50.94	Q
2	2	Tosin Adeloye	Nigeria	51.24	Q
3	2	Tjipekapora Herunga	Namibia	51.51	Q, SB
4	1	Patience Okon George	Nigeria	51.77	Q
5	1	Margaret Etim	Nigeria	52.34	Q
6	1	Djénébou Danté	Mali	52.51	Q, NR
6	2	Leni Shida	Uganda	52.51	q
8	1	Lydia Jele	Botswana	52.57	q, SB
9	1	Justine Palframan	South Africa	52.75	
10	2	Fatoumata Diop	Senegal	52.79	SB
11	1	Phumlile Ndzinisa	Swaziland	53.02	NR
12	1	Hellen Syombua	Kenya	53.05	SB
13	2	Maureen Nyatichi	Kenya	53.11	
14	1	Goitseone Seleka	Botswana	53.23	
15	2	Christine Botlogetswe	Botswana	54.32	
16	2	Audrey Nkamsao	Cameroon	56.33	

=== Final ===
Rank	Lane	Name	Nationality	Time	Notes
1st place, gold medalist(s)	4	Kabange Mupopo	Zambia	50.22	NR
2nd place, silver medalist(s)	5	Patience Okon George	Nigeria	50.71	
3rd place, bronze medalist(s)	8	Tjipekapora Herunga	Namibia	51.55	
4	7	Tosin Adeloye	Nigeria	51.82	
5	6	Margaret Etim	Nigeria	52.64	
6	3	Leni Shida	Uganda	52.86	
7	9	Djénébou Danté	Mali	53.41	
8	2	Lydia Jele	Botswana	53.85	
