= Ada Benjamin =

Nigerian sprinter (born 1994)

Personal information
- Nationality: Nigerian
- Born: 18 May 1994 (age 32) Lagos, Nigeria

Sport
- Country: Nigeria
- Sport: Track and field
- Event: 400 metres
Medal record
Women's athletics
Representing Nigeria
African Championships
Gold medal – first place	2014 Marrakesh	4×400 m
Commonwealth Games
Silver medal – second place	2014 Glasgow	4x400 m
Continental Cup
Bronze medal – third place	2014 Marrakesh	4x400 m

Ada Benjamin (born 18 May 1994) is a Nigerian athlete, specializing in sprinting.

== Life ==
In 2014, at the Commonwealth Games in Glasgow she won the silver medal in the 4 × 400 m relay with Patience Okon George, Regina George and Folashade Abugan.

She is studying at University of Texas, El Paso (UTEP), majoring in business. Benjamin is a member of the UTEP's indoor and outdoor track team.

== Medals ==
	Competition	Venue	Place	Event	Result
2014	Athletics at the 2014 Commonwealth Games	Glasgow, United Kingdom	2nd	4 × 400 m	3' 24.71"
2014	2014 African Championships in Athletics	Marrakesh, Morocco	1st	4 × 400 m	3' 28.87"
2014	2014 IAAF Continental Cup	Marrakesh, Morocco	3rd	4 × 400 m	3 min 25 s 51
