= 2014 IAAF World Relays – Women's 4 × 400 metres relay =

Women's 4 × 400 metres relay at the 2014 IAAF World Relays
- Venue: Thomas Robinson Stadium
- Dates: 24 May (heats) & 25 May (final)

The women's 4 × 400 metres relay at the 2014 IAAF World Relays was held at the Thomas Robinson Stadium on 24 and 25 May.

== Records ==
Prior to the competition, the records were as follows:

World record	Soviet Union (Tatyana Ledovskaya, Olga Nazarova, Mariya Pinigina, Olga Bryzgina)	3:15.17	Seoul, South Korea	1 October 1988
Championship record	New event			
World Leading	(United States) University of Texas	3:25.05	Philadelphia, United States	26 April 2014
African Record	Nigeria (Olabisi Afolabi, Fatima Yusuf, Charity Opara, Falilat Ogunkoya)	3:21.04	Atlanta, United States	3 August 1996
Asian Record	(China) Hebei province (An Xiaohong, Bai Xiaoyun, Cao Chunying, Ma Yuqin)	3:24.28	Beijing, China	13 September 1993
North, Central American and Caribbean record	United States (Denean Howard, Diane Dixon, Valerie Brisco-Hooks, Florence Griffith Joyner)	3:15.51	Seoul, South Korea	1 October 1988
South American Record	(Brazil) BM&F Bovespa (Geisa Aparecida Coutinho, Bárbara de Oliveira, Joelma Sousa, Jailma de Lima)	3:26.68	São Paulo, Brazil	7 August 2011
European Record	Soviet Union (Tatyana Ledovskaya, Olga Nazarova, Mariya Pinigina, Olga Bryzgina)	3:15.17	Seoul, South Korea	1 October 1988
Oceanian record	Australia (Nova Peris, Tamsyn Manou, Melinda Gainsford-Taylor, Cathy Freeman)	3:23.81	Sydney, Australia	30 September 2000

== Schedule ==
Date	Time	Round
24 May 2014	18:26	Heats
25 May 2014	18:12	Final

All times are local times (UTC−4)

== Results ==
KEY:	q	Fastest non-qualifiers	Q	Qualified	NR	National record	PB	Personal best	SB	Seasonal best

=== Heats ===
Qualification: First 3 of each heat (Q) plus the 2 fastest times (q) advanced to the final.

Rank	Heat	Lane	Nation	Athletes	Time	Notes
1	2	5	United States	DeeDee Trotter, Sanya Richards-Ross, Monica Hargrove, Jessica Beard	3:23.84	Q, CR
2	2	3	Jamaica	Christine Day, Anastasia Le-Roy, Shericka Jackson, Kaliese Spencer	3:24.95	Q, SB
3	1	4	Nigeria	Folasade Abugan, Regina George, Bukola Abogunloko, Patience Okon George	3:27.07	Q, SB
4	2	4	Great Britain	Eilidh Child, Shana Cox, Emily Diamond, Margaret Adeoye	3:27.30	Q, SB
5	2	6	Poland	Małgorzata Hołub, Patrycja Wyciszkiewicz, Agata Bednarek, Justyna Święty	3:27.37	q, SB
6	2	8	France	Marie Gayot, Lenora Guion-Fermin, Estelle Perrossier, Floria Gueï	3:28.93	q, SB
7	1	7	Brazil	Joelma Sousa, Liliane Fernandes, Jailma de Lima, Geisa Aparecida Coutinho	3:30.37	Q, SB
8	1	3	Italy	Chiara Bazzoni, Maria Enrica Spacca, Elena Maria Bonfanti, Libania Grenot	3:30.67	Q, SB
9	1	8	Trinidad and Tobago	Shawna Fermin, Domonique Williams, Romona Modeste, Alena Brooks	3:30.91	SB
10	2	7	Australia	Anneliese Rubie, Jessica Gulli, Lyndsay Pekin, Morgan Mitchell	3:30.92	SB
11	1	6	Canada	Carline Muir, Jenna Martin, Wendy Fawn Dorr, Noelle Montcalm	3:34.60	SB
12	1	5	Bahamas	Lanece Clarke, Shakeitha Henfield, Christine Amertil, Miriam Byfield	3:54.95	
	1	2	Russia	Yelena Zuykevich, Nadezhda Kotlyarova, Ayvika Malanova, Svetlana Rogozina	DNS	

=== Final ===
==== Final B ====
Rank	Lane	Nation	Athletes	Time	Notes
9	3	Australia	Anneliese Rubie, Morgan Mitchell, Jessica Gulli, Lyndsay Pekin	3:31.01	
10	6	Bahamas	Lanece Clarke, Christine Amertil, Shakeitha Henfield, Miriam Byfield	3:31.71	SB
11	4	Canada	Jenna Martin, Carline Muir, Sarah-Lynn Wells, Wendy Fawn Dorr	3:32.58	SB
12	5	Trinidad and Tobago	Shawna Fermin, Alena Brooks, Magnolia Howell, Romona Modeste	3:33.21	

==== Final A ====
Rank	Lane	Nation	Athletes	Time	Notes	Points
1st place, gold medalist(s)	5	United States	DeeDee Trotter, Sanya Richards-Ross, Natasha Hastings, Joanna Atkins	3:21.73	CR	8
2nd place, silver medalist(s)	4	Jamaica	Kaliese Spencer, Novlene Williams-Mills, Anastasia Le-Roy, Shericka Jackson	3:23.26	SB	7
3rd place, bronze medalist(s)	6	Nigeria	Folasade Abugan, Regina George, Omolara Omotoso, Patience Okon George	3:23.41	SB	6
4	1	France	Marie Gayot, Lénora Guion-Firmin, Agnès Raharolahy, Floria Gueï	3:25.84	SB	5
5	2	Poland	Małgorzata Hołub, Patrycja Wyciszkiewicz, Joanna Linkiewicz, Justyna Święty	3:27.37	=SB	4
6	7	Italy	Chiara Bazzoni, Maria Enrica Spacca, Elena Maria Bonfanti, Libania Grenot	3:27.44	SB	3
7	8	Great Britain	Eilidh Child, Shana Cox, Christine Ohuruogu, Margaret Adeoye	3:28.03		2
8	3	Brazil	Joelma Sousa, Liliane Fernandes, Jailma de Lima, Geisa Aparecida Coutinho	3:31.59		1
