= Athletics at the 2018 Commonwealth Games – Women's 4 × 400 metres relay =

Women's 4 × 400 metres relay at the 2018 Commonwealth Games
- Venue: Carrara Stadium
- Dates: 14 April (final)
- Nations: 8
- Winning time: 3:24.00

Medalists
gold medal	Christine Day; Anastasia Le-Roy; Janieve Russell; Stephenie Ann McPherson	Jamaica
silver medal	Patience Okon George; Glory Onome Nathaniel; Praise Idamadudu; Yinka Ajayi	Nigeria
bronze medal	Galefele Moroko; Christine Botlogetswe; Loungo Matlhaku; Amantle Montsho	Botswana

The women's 4 × 400 metres relay at the 2018 Commonwealth Games, as part of the athletics programme, took place in the Carrara Stadium on 14 April 2018.

== Records ==
Prior to this competition, the existing world and Games records were as follows:

World record	Soviet Union (Tatyana Ledovskaya, Olga Nazarova, Mariya Pinigina, Olga Bryzhina)	3:15.17	Seoul, South Korea	1 October 1988
Games record	Jamaica (Stephenie Ann McPherson, Christine Day, Novlene Williams-Mills, Anastasia Le-Roy)	3:23.82	Glasgow, Scotland	2 August 2014

== Schedule ==
The schedule was as follows:

Date	Time	Round
Saturday 14 April 2018	16:38	Final

All times are Australian Eastern Standard Time (UTC+10)

== Results ==
With eight teams, the event was held as a straight final.

=== Final ===
Rank	Nation	Athletes	Result	Notes
1st place, gold medalist(s)	Jamaica	Christine Day; Anastasia Le-Roy; Janieve Russell; Stephenie Ann McPherson	3:24.00	
2nd place, silver medalist(s)	Nigeria	Patience Okon George; Glory Onome Nathaniel; Praise Idamadudu; Yinka Ajayi	3:25.29	
3rd place, bronze medalist(s)	Botswana	Galefele Moroko; Christine Botlogetswe; Loungo Matlhaku; Amantle Montsho	3:26.86	NR
4	England	Anyika Onuora; Finette Agyapong; Perri Shakes-Drayton; Emily Diamond	3:27.21	
5	Australia	Anneliese Rubie; Caitlin Sargent-Jones; Lauren Wells; Morgan Mitchell	3:27.43	SB
6	Scotland	Zoey Clark; Kirsten McAslan; Lynsey Sharp; Eilidh Doyle	3:29.18	NR
7	India	Sonia Baishya; M. R. Poovamma; Sarita Gayakwad; Hima Das	3:33.61	
8	Uganda	Leni Shida; Emily Nanziri; Halima Nakaayi; Scovia Ayikoru	3:35.03	
