= 2014 African Championships in Athletics – Women's 400 metres =

The women's 400 metres event at the 2014 African Championships in Athletics was held August 11–12 on Stade de Marrakech.

== Medalists ==
Gold	Silver	Bronze
Folashade Abugan; Nigeria	Kabange Mupopo; Zambia	Patience Okon George; Nigeria

== Results ==
=== Heats ===
Qualification: First 2 of each heat (Q) and the next 2 fastest (q) qualified for the final.

Rank	Heat	Name	Nationality	Time	Notes
1	3	Kabange Mupopo	Zambia	51.54	Q
2	2	Patience Okon George	Nigeria	51.55	Q
3	3	Ada Benjamin	Nigeria	51.68	Q
4	1	Folashade Abugan	Nigeria	52.09	Q
5	2	Maureen Jelagat	Kenya	52.62	Q
6	1	Djénébou Danté	Mali	53.19	Q
7	1	Justine Palframan	South Africa	53.34	q
8	3	Phumlile Ndzinisa	Swaziland	53.36	q
9	3	Lydia Mashila	Botswana	53.37	
10	2	Fatoumata Diop	Senegal	53.95	
11	1	Jacinter Shikanda	Kenya	54.25	
12	2	Audrey Nkamsao	Cameroon	54.98	
13	3	Shawkia Iddrisu	Ghana	55.01	
14	3	Kore Tola	Ethiopia	55.04	
15	2	Kadia Dembele	Mali	55.38	
16	1	Natacha Ngoye Akamabi	Republic of the Congo	55.40	
17	2	Goitseone Seleka	Botswana	55.67	
18	2	Chaltu Shumi	Ethiopia	55.72	
19	1	Rhoda Njovu	Zambia	55.79	
20	1	Hasna Grioui	Morocco	56.30	
21	1	Fantu Magiso	Ethiopia	58.27	
22	3	Mberihonga Kanduvazu	Namibia	1:01.40	
23	3	Anissa Emile	Seychelles	1:02.20	

=== Final ===
Rank	Lane	Name	Nationality	Time	Notes
1st place, gold medalist(s)	4	Folashade Abugan	Nigeria	51.21	
2nd place, silver medalist(s)	5	Kabange Mupopo	Zambia	51.21	NR
3rd place, bronze medalist(s)	3	Patience Okon George	Nigeria	51.68	
4	6	Ada Benjamin	Nigeria	52.59	
5	8	Maureen Jelagat	Kenya	52.96	
6	2	Justine Palframan	South Africa	53.70	
7	7	Djénébou Danté	Mali	54.34	
8	1	Phumlile Ndzinisa	Swaziland	54.96	
