= 2015 World Championships in Athletics – Women's 400 metres =

Women's 400 metres at the 2015 World Championships
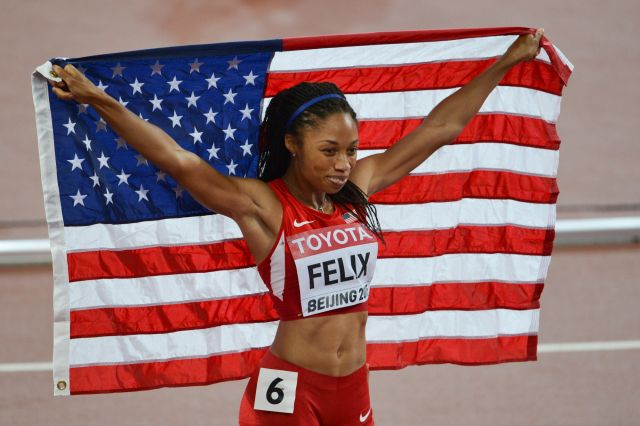
- Allyson Felix shortly after winning the title.
- Venue: Beijing National Stadium
- Dates: 24 August (heats); 25 August (semifinals); 27 August (final)
- Competitors: 42 from 24 nations
- Winning time: 49.26

Medalists
gold medal	Allyson Felix	United States
silver medal	Shaunae Miller	Bahamas
bronze medal	Shericka Jackson	Jamaica

The women's 400 metres at the 2015 World Championships in Athletics was held at the Beijing National Stadium on 24, 25 and 27 August. Christine Ohuruogu of Great Britain entered the competition as the defending champion.

== Summary ==
Allyson Felix was known as a 200 metres specialist, but two years earlier, her string of 200 meter championships was broken when she sustained a hamstring injury in the final. Based on winning the 2014 Diamond League, Felix was qualified to enter the 200 metres at the World Championships but chose to forgo that opportunity to focus on the 400 metres. This was her bid to win the one title she didn't have under her belt; in the same event at the 2011 World Championships, she narrowly lost to Amantle Montsho of Botswana. With world leader Francena McCorory unable to qualify at the American Championships, Felix was the favorite. Defending champion Christine Ohuruogu, known for her late rush, also made the final.

With high expectations, Felix took off strongly running her first 200 metres. She kept building on her lead, coming off the final turn several steps ahead of Shericka Jackson the next out of the turn. While Felix didn't further advance her lead, she kept her margin on Jackson for a clear win. Shaunae Miller made a powerful rush to the finish, passing Jackson for the silver and gaining on Felix down the home stretch. Jackson beat three other Jamaican teammates for the bronze.

== Records ==
Prior to the competition, the records were as follows:

World record	Marita Koch (GDR)	47.60	Canberra, Australia	6 October 1985
Championship record	Jarmila Kratochvílová (TCH)	47.99	Helsinki, Finland	10 August 1983
World leading	Francena McCorory (USA)	49.83	Fontvieille, Monaco	17 July 2015
African record	Falilat Ogunkoya (NGR)	49.10	Atlanta, United States	29 July 1996
Asian record	Ma Yuqin (CHN)	49.81	Beijing, China	11 September 1993
NACAC record	Sanya Richards-Ross (USA)	48.70	Athens, Greece	16 September 2006
South American record	Ximena Restrepo (COL)	49.64	Barcelona, Spain	5 August 1992
European record	Marita Koch (GDR)	47.60	Canberra, Australia	6 October 1985
Oceanian record	Cathy Freeman (AUS)	48.63	Atlanta, United States	29 July 1996
The following records were established during the competition:
World leading	Allyson Felix (USA)	49.26	Beijing, China	27 August 2015

== Qualification standards ==
Entry standards
52.00

== Schedule ==
Date	Time	Round
24 August 2015	10:45	Heats
25 August 2015	19:05	Semifinals
27 August 2015	20:40	Final

All times are local times (UTC+8)

== Results ==
KEY:	Q	Qualified	q	Fastest non-qualifiers	NR	National record	PB	Personal best	SB	Seasonal best

=== Heats ===
Qualification: First 3 in each heat (Q) and the next 6 fastest (q) advanced to the semifinals.

Rank	Heat	Name	Nationality	Time	Notes
1	4	Stephenie Ann McPherson	Jamaica	50.34	Q, SB
2	5	Bianca Răzor	Romania	50.37	Q, PB
3	5	Shericka Jackson	Jamaica	50.41	Q
4	4	Phyllis Francis	United States	50.52	Q, SB
5	6	Shaunae Miller	Bahamas	50.53	Q
6	3	Christine Day	Jamaica	50.58	Q
7	1	Allyson Felix	United States	50.60	Q
8	3	Joy Sakari	Kenya	50.71	Q, NR
9	5	Patience Okon George	Nigeria	50.87	Q
10	1	Floria Gueï	France	50.89	Q, PB
11	2	Christine Ohuruogu	Great Britain & N.I.	51.01	Q
12	6	Novlene Williams-Mills	Jamaica	51.07	Q, SB
12	1	Nataliya Pyhyda	Ukraine	51.07	Q, SB
14	5	Anyika Onuora	Great Britain & N.I.	51.14	q, PB
15	2	Marie Gayot	France	51.24	Q, PB
16	2	Natasha Hastings	United States	51.25	Q
17	1	Patrycja Wyciszkiewicz	Poland	51.31	q, PB
18	2	Maureen Jelagat Maiyo	Kenya	51.40	q, PB
19	4	Nadezhda Kotlyarova	Russia	51.42	Q, PB
20	6	Ekaterina Renzhina	Russia	51.55	Q
20	3	Kabange Mupopo	Zambia	51.55	Q
22	6	Libania Grenot	Italy	51.64	q
23	1	Anneliese Rubie	Australia	51.69	q, PB
24	5	Carline Muir	Canada	51.70	q, SB
25	4	Regina George	Nigeria	51.74	
25	4	Małgorzata Hołub	Poland	51.74	PB
27	6	Olha Zemlyak	Ukraine	52.00	
28	6	Iga Baumgart	Poland	52.02	PB
29	3	Mariya Mikhailyuk	Russia	52.16	
30	3	Gunta Latiševa-Čudare	Latvia	52.17	PB
31	1	Kineke Alexander	Saint Vincent and the Grenadines	52.24	
32	5	Lisneidy Veitia	Cuba	52.25	
33	2	Tosin Adeloye	Nigeria	52.42	
34	4	Justine Palframan	South Africa	52.45	
35	3	Maria Benedicta Chigbolu	Italy	52.48	
36	1	Iveta Putalová	Slovakia	52.52	
37	2	Geisa Coutinho	Brazil	52.72	
38	6	Aauri Bokesa	Spain	52.98	
39	3	Audrey Jean-Baptiste	Canada	53.18	
40	2	Amaliya Sharoyan	Armenia	54.16	
41	4	Dil Maya Karki	Nepal	1:00.99	
	5	Jacinter Shikanda	Kenya	DQ	

=== Semifinals ===
Qualification: First 2 in each heat (Q) and the next 2 fastest (q) advanced to the final.

Rank	Heat	Name	Nationality	Time	Notes
1	3	Allyson Felix	United States	49.89	Q, SB
2	3	Shericka Jackson	Jamaica	50.03	Q, PB
3	1	Shaunae Miller	Bahamas	50.12	Q
4	2	Christine Ohuruogu	Great Britain & N.I.	50.16	Q, SB
5	2	Stephenie Ann McPherson	Jamaica	50.32	Q, SB
6	3	Novlene Williams-Mills	Jamaica	50.47	q, SB
7	2	Phyllis Francis	United States	50.50	q, SB
8	3	Nataliya Pyhyda	Ukraine	50.62	PB
9	2	Patience Okon George	Nigeria	50.76	PB
10	1	Christine Day	Jamaica	50.82	Q
11	3	Anyika Onuora	Great Britain & N.I.	50.87	PB
12	2	Marie Gayot	France	50.97	PB
13	3	Bianca Răzor	Romania	51.05	
14	1	Libania Grenot	Italy	51.14	
15	1	Floria Gueï	France	51.30	
16	1	Natasha Hastings	United States	51.33	
17	2	Ekaterina Renzhina	Russia	51.49	PB
18	1	Nadezhda Kotlyarova	Russia	51.86	
19	3	Maureen Jelagat Maiyo	Kenya	51.92	
20	3	Kabange Mupopo	Zambia	51.93	
21	2	Patrycja Wyciszkiewicz	Poland	51.94	
22	1	Anneliese Rubie	Australia	52.04	
23	2	Carline Muir	Canada	52.31	
	1	Joy Sakari	Kenya	DNS	

=== Final ===
The final was held at 20:40.

Rank	Lane	Name	Nationality	Time	Notes
1st place, gold medalist(s)	6	Allyson Felix	United States	49.26	WL
2nd place, silver medalist(s)	5	Shaunae Miller	Bahamas	49.67	PB
3rd place, bronze medalist(s)	4	Shericka Jackson	Jamaica	49.99	PB
4	8	Christine Day	Jamaica	50.14	PB
5	9	Stephenie Ann McPherson	Jamaica	50.42	
6	2	Novlene Williams-Mills	Jamaica	50.47	SB
7	3	Phyllis Francis	United States	50.51	
8	7	Christine Ohuruogu	Great Britain & N.I.	50.63	
