= 2018 African Championships in Athletics – Women's 4 × 400 metres relay =

The women's 4 × 400 metres relay event at the 2018 African Championships in Athletics was held on 5 August in Asaba, Nigeria.

== Results ==
Rank	Nation	Competitors	Time	Notes
1st place, gold medalist(s)	Nigeria	Patience Okon George, Abike Egbeniyi, Folashade Abugan, Yinka Ajayi	3:31.17	
2nd place, silver medalist(s)	Kenya	Maureen Jelagat, Hellen Syombua, Navian Michira, Veronica Mutua	3:35.45	
3rd place, bronze medalist(s)	Zambia	Quincy Malekani, Abygirl Sepiso, Majory Chisanga, Rhodah Njobvu	3:38.18	
4	Botswana	Goitseone Seleka, Loungo Matlhaku, Tsaone Sebele, Galefele Moroko	3:42.16	
5	Ethiopia	Worknesh Mesele, Gebreyohannis Firezewa, Gebeyanesh Gadecha, Frehiywot Wondie	3:44.84	
5	Cameroon	Audrey Nkansao, Lilian Nguetsa, Ngouyaka Angounou, ?	3:45.63	
	Senegal		DNS	
	Uganda		DNS	
