= 2017 IAAF World Relays – Women's 4 × 400 metres relay =

Women's 4 × 400 metres relay at the 2017 IAAF World Relays
- Venue: Thomas Robinson Stadium
- Dates: 22 April (heats) & 23 April (final)
- Competitors: 73 from 16 nations

Medalists
gold medal	Phyllis Francis; Ashley Spencer; Quanera Hayes; Natasha Hastings; Joanna Atkins*	United States
silver medal	Małgorzata Hołub; Iga Baumgart; Adrianna Janowicz; Justyna Święty	Poland
bronze medal	Janieve Russell; Anneisha McLaughlin-Whilby; Verone Chambers; Stephenie Ann McPherson; Christine Day*; Dawnalee Loney*	Jamaica

The women's 4 × 400 metres relay at the 2017 IAAF World Relays was held at the Thomas Robinson Stadium on 22 and 23 April.

== Schedule ==
Date	Time	Round
22 April 2017	20:31	Heats
23 April 2017	20:35	Final B
23 April 2017	21:13	Final

All times are local times (UTC−4)

== Results ==
KEY:	Q	Qualified	q	Fastest non-qualifiers	NR	National record	PB	Personal best	SB	Seasonal best	WC	2017 World Championships qualification

=== Heats ===
Qualification: First 2 of each heat (Q) plus the 2 fastest times (q) advanced to the final. The next 8 fastest times qualified for the final B.

Rank	Heat	Nation	Athletes	Time	Notes
1	1	United States	Joanna Atkins, Ashley Spencer, Quanera Hayes, Natasha Hastings	3:29.27	Q
2	3	Poland	Małgorzata Hołub, Iga Baumgart, Adrianna Janowicz, Justyna Święty	3:29.42	Q, SB
3	3	Jamaica	Christine Day, Janieve Russell, Dawnalee Loney, Anneisha McLaughlin-Whilby	3:29.93	Q, SB
4	1	Australia	Morgan Mitchell, Anneliese Rubie, Ella Nelson, Olivia Tauro	3:30.31	Q, SB
5	3	Botswana	Christine Botlogetswe, Lydia Jele, Galefele Moroko, Amantle Montsho	3:31.61	q, SB
6	2	Nigeria	Patience Okon George, Ugonna Ndu, Jennifer Adaeze Edobi, Margaret Bamgbose	3:31.97	Q, SB
7	2	Great Britain	Eilidh Doyle, Emily Diamond, Anyika Onuora, Kelly Massey	3:33.00	Q
8	1	France	Déborah Sananes, Brigitte Ntiamoah, Agnès Raharolahy, Floria Gueï	3:33.41	q, SB
9	2	Canada	Carline Muir, Alicia Brown, Noelle Montcalm, Kelsey Balkwill	3:33.54	SB
10	2	Bahamas	Shaunae Miller-Uibo, Anthonique Strachan, Christine Amertil, Rashan Brown	3:34.40	SB
11	1	Brazil	Cristiane Silva, Natália da Silva, Geisa Coutinho, Jailma de Lima	3:34.72	SB
12	2	Colombia	Eliana Chávez, Jennifer Padilla, Astrid Balanta, Rosa Escobar	3:40.19	SB
13	3	Kenya	Jacinter Shikanda, Veronica Mutua, Grace Kidake, Maximila Imali	3:41.11	SB
14	2	Venezuela	Yenisquel Alfonso, María Simancas, Bryannill Cardona, Odellani Monges	3:46.80	SB
	1	Trinidad and Tobago	Kai Selvon, Janeil Bellille, Chelsea Charles, Domonique Williams	DQ	R170.20
	3	Germany	Laura Müller, Lara Hoffmann, Laura Gläsner, Ruth Sophia Spelmeyer	DQ	R170.11

=== Final B ===
Rank	Lane	Nation	Athletes	Time	Notes
1	6	Brazil	Jailma de Lima, Jessica da Silva, Geisa Coutinho, Natália da Silva	3:34.68	SB
2	4	Canada	Carline Muir, Alicia Brown, Audrey Jean-Baptiste, Kelsey Balkwill	3:35.07	
3	7	Colombia	Astrid Balanta, Rosa Escobar, Johana Arrieta, Jennifer Padilla	3:38.02	SB
4	8	Kenya	Maximila Imali, Veronica Mutua, Grace Kidake, Jacinter Shikanda	3:40.98	SB
	5	Bahamas		DNS	
	3	Venezuela		DNS	

=== Final ===
Rank	Lane	Nation	Athletes	Time	Notes	Points
1st place, gold medalist(s)	4	United States	Phyllis Francis, Ashley Spencer, Quanera Hayes, Natasha Hastings	3:24.36	WL, *WC	8
2nd place, silver medalist(s)	5	Poland	Małgorzata Hołub, Iga Baumgart, Adrianna Janowicz, Justyna Święty	3:28.28	SB, *WC	7
3rd place, bronze medalist(s)	3	Jamaica	Janieve Russell, Anneisha McLaughlin-Whilby, Verone Chambers, Stephenie Ann McPherson	3:28.49	SB, *WC	6
4	7	Great Britain	Emily Diamond, Laviai Nielsen, Eilidh Doyle, Christine Ohuruogu	3:28.72	SB, *WC	5
5	8	Australia	Morgan Mitchell, Anneliese Rubie, Caitlin Sargent-Jones, Olivia Tauro	3:28.80	SB, *WC	4
6	1	Botswana	Amantle Montsho, Lydia Jele, Galefele Moroko, Christine Botlogetswe	3:30.13	NR, *WC	3
7	6	Nigeria	Patience Okon George, Ugonna Ndu, Jennifer Adaeze Edobi, Margaret Bamgbose	3:32.94	*WC	2
8	2	France	Déborah Sananes, Brigitte Ntiamoah, Agnès Raharolahy, Floria Gueï	3:35.03	*WC	1
