= Patience Okon George =

Nigerian sprinter (born 1991)

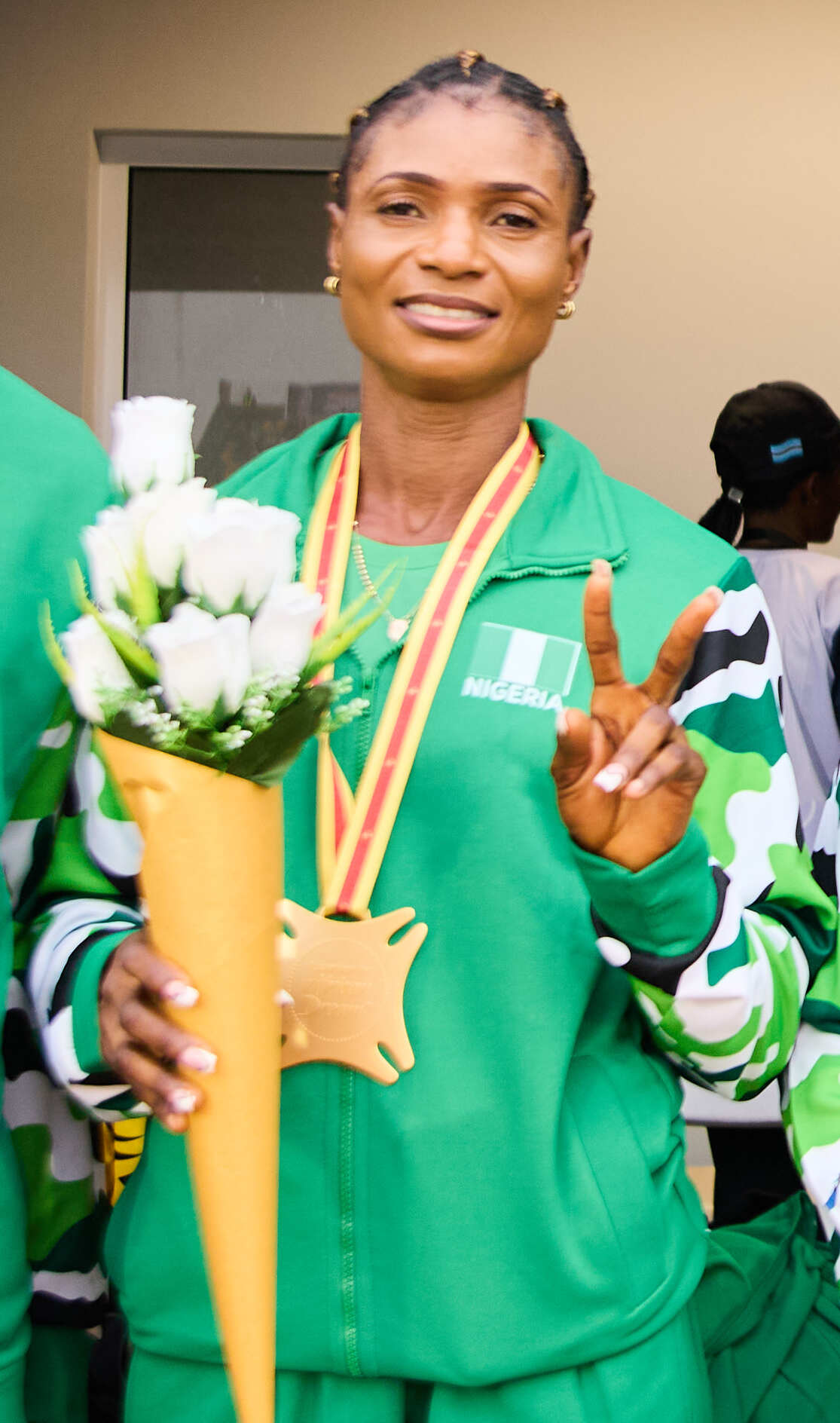
- George in 2024

Personal information
- Born: 25 November 1991 (age 34) Cross River State, Nigeria
- Height: 1.69 m (5 ft 7 in)
- Weight: 63 kg (139 lb)

Sport
- Country: Nigeria
- Sport: Track and field
- Event: 400 metres
- Club: Cross River

Achievements and titles
- Personal best: 400 m 50.71 s (2015)
Medal record
Women's athletics
Representing Nigeria
Commonwealth Games
Silver medal – second place	2014 Glasgow	4x100 m relay
Silver medal – second place	2014 Glasgow	4×400 m relay
Silver medal – second place	2018 Gold Coast	4×400 m relay
Bronze medal – third place	2026 Glasgow	4×400m Mixed
African Games
Gold medal – first place	2015 Brazzaville	4×400 m relay
Gold medal – first place	2019 Rabat	4×400 m relay
Gold medal – first place	2023 Accra	4×400 m relay
Gold medal – first place	2023 Accra	Mixed 4×400 m relay
Silver medal – second place	2015 Brazzaville	400 m
African Championships
Gold medal – first place	2014 Marrakesh	4×400 m relay
Gold medal – first place	2018 Asaba	4×400 m relay
Gold medal – first place	2024 Douala	4×400 m relay
Gold medal – first place	2026 Accra	4 x 400m relay
Gold medal – first place	2026 Accra	Mixed 4×400 m relay
Silver medal – second place	2016 Durban	4×400 m relay
Silver medal – second place	2022 Saint Pierre	Mixed 4×400 m relay
Silver medal – second place	2024 Douala	Mixed 4×400 m relay
Bronze medal – third place	2014 Marrakesh	400 m
Bronze medal – third place	2016 Durban	400 m
Bronze medal – third place	2022 Saint Pierre	4×400 m relay
Islamic Solidarity Games
Silver medal – second place	2025 Riyadh	400 m
World Relays
Bronze medal – third place	2014 Nassau	4×400 m relay
Continental Cup
Bronze medal – third place	2014 Marrakesh	4×400 m

Patience Okon George (born 25 November 1991) is a Nigerian sprinter. She competed in the 400 metres event at the 2015 World Championships in Athletics in Beijing, China and also at the 2016 Olympic Games in Rio de Janeiro, Brazil. George is a two-time African Championships bronze medallist in the individual 400 metres event. She is also a three-time Nigerian national champion in the 400 metres.

== Career ==
On 2 August 2014, she ran the first leg of the 4 × 400 m relay for the Nigerian team that came second behind the Jamaican quartet at the Glasgow Commonwealth Games. She also ran in the heats of the 4 × 100 m relay for Nigeria.

Okon George won a bronze medal at the 2014 African Championships in Marrakesh, behind fellow Nigerian, Sade Abugan and Kabange Mupopo of Zambia. She also won a gold medal in the 4 × 400 m relay with teammates Regina George, Ada Benjamin, and Sade Abugan.

In 2015, Okon George set a new PB of 50.76s in the 400 m at the Resisprint meeting in the Swiss city of La Chaux-de-Fonds. This was her first time under the 51s barrier. At the 2015 World Championships in Athletics, she equalled her PB in the semi-finals of the women's 400 m after posting a time of 50.87 s to qualify third fastest in her heat. Later on, in the year at the All Africa Games, she won a silver medal behind Kabange Mupopo in a new personal best of 50.71 s.

She won her second individual African Championships bronze medal in the 400 metres at the 2016 Durban Championships. She placed third behind Mupopo and Margaret Wambui. She also anchored the Nigerian 4 × 400 m quartet (Omolara Omotosho, Regina George, Yinka Ajayi, Patience Okon George) to a silver medal on the last day of the championships. She successfully defended her national title in 2016 and sealed her spot for the 2016 Summer Olympics in Rio de Janeiro.

In 2019, George won the gold medal in the women's 4 × 400 metres relay at the 2019 African Games held in Rabat, Morocco. In 2026, she was part of the quartet that won the bronze medal in the mixed 4×400m relay at the Commonwealth Games in Glasgow.

== International competitions ==
Year	Competition	Venue	Position	Event	Notes
Representing Nigeria
2013	World Championships	Moscow, Russia	–	4 × 100 m relay	DQ
2013	World Championships	Moscow, Russia	6th	4 × 400 m relay	3:27.57
2014	World Indoor Championships	Sopot, Poland	5th	4 × 400 m relay	3:31.59
2014	World Relays	Nassau, Bahamas	7th	4 × 200 m relay	1:33.71
2014	World Relays	Nassau, Bahamas	3rd	4 × 400 m relay	3:23.41
2014	Commonwealth Games	Glasgow, United Kingdom	4th (h)	4 × 100 m relay	44.13
2014	Commonwealth Games	Glasgow, United Kingdom	2nd	4 × 400 m relay	3:24.71
2014	African Championships	Marrakesh, Morocco	3rd	400 m	51.68
2014	African Championships	Marrakesh, Morocco	1st	4 × 400 m relay	3:28.87
2014	Continental Cup	Marrakesh, Morocco	3rd	4 × 400 m relay	3:25.51^{1}
2015	World Relays	Nassau, Bahamas	10th (h)	4 × 400 m relay	3:32.16
2015	World Championships	Beijing, China	9th (sf)	400 m	50.76
2015	World Championships	Beijing, China	5th	4 × 400 m relay	3:25.11
2015	African Games	Brazzaville, Republic of the Congo	2nd	400 m	50.71
2015	African Games	Brazzaville, Republic of the Congo	1st	4 × 400 m relay	3:27.12
2016	African Championships	Durban, South Africa	3rd	400 m	52.33
2016	African Championships	Durban, South Africa	2nd	4 × 400 m relay	3:29.94
2016	Olympic Games	Rio de Janeiro, Brazil	23rd (sf)	400 m	52.52
2017	World Relays	Nassau, Bahamas	5th	4 × 200 m relay	1:33.08
2017	World Relays	Nassau, Bahamas	7th	4 × 400 m relay	3:32.94
2017	World Championships	London, United Kingdom	21st (sf)	400 m	52.60
2017	World Championships	London, United Kingdom	5th	4 × 400 m relay	3:26.72
2018	Commonwealth Games	Gold Coast, Australia	–	400 m	DQ
2018	Commonwealth Games	Gold Coast, Australia	2nd	4 × 400 m relay	3:25.29
2018	African Championships	Asaba, Nigeria	5th	400 m	52.34
2018	African Championships	Asaba, Nigeria	3rd	4 × 400 m relay	3:31.17
2019	World Relays	Yokohama, Japan	17th (h)	4 × 100 m relay	45.07
2019	World Relays	Yokohama, Japan	18th (h)	4 × 400 m relay	3:32.10
2019	African Games	Rabat, Morocco	5th	400 m	52.18
2019	African Games	Rabat, Morocco	1st	4 × 400 m relay	3:30.32
2019	World Championships	Doha, Qatar	17th (sf)	400 m	51.89
2019	World Championships	Doha, Qatar	15th (h)	4 × 400 m relay	3:35.90
2021	Olympic Games	Tokyo, Japan	30th (h)	400 m	52.41
2021	Olympic Games	Tokyo, Japan	12th (h)	4 × 100 m relay	43.25
2022	African Championships	Port Louis, Mauritius	5th	400 m	52.98
2022	African Championships	Port Louis, Mauritius	3rd	4 × 400 m relay	3:36.24
2023	World Championships	Budapest, Hungary	–	4 × 400 m relay	DQ
2024	African Games	Accra, Ghana	1st	4 × 400 m relay	3:27.29
2024	African Championships	Douala, Cameroon	1st	4 × 400 m relay	3:27.31
2025	Islamic Solidarity Games	Riyadh, Saudi Arabia	2nd	400 m	51.93
2025	Islamic Solidarity Games	Riyadh, Saudi Arabia	1st	Mixed 4 × 400 m relay	3:16.27
2026	Commonwealth Games	Glasgow, United Kingdom	14th (sf)	400 m	53.21

^{1}Representing Africa
