= 2018 African Championships in Athletics – Women's 400 metres =

The women's 400 metres event at the 2018 African Championships in Athletics was held on 2 and 3 August in Asaba, Nigeria.

== Medalists ==
Gold	Silver	Bronze
Caster Semenya; South Africa	Christine Botlogetswe; Botswana	Yinka Ajayi; Nigeria

== Results ==
=== Heats ===
Qualification: First 3 of each heat (Q) and the next 4 fastest (q) qualified for the semifinals.

Rank	Heat	Name	Nationality	Time	Notes
1	4	Yinka Ajayi	Nigeria	52.38	Q
2	1	Caster Semenya	South Africa	52.98	Q
3	1	Christine Botlogetswe	Botswana	53.19	Q
4	2	Patience Okon George	Nigeria	53.39	Q
5	4	Veronica Mutua	Kenya	53.55	Q
6	1	Leni Shida	Uganda	53.60	Q
7	2	Margaret Barrie	Sierra Leone	53.61	Q
8	1	Maximila Imali	Kenya	53.62	q
9	4	Frehiywot Wondie	Ethiopia	53.88	Q
10	3	Quincy Malekani	Zambia	54.06	Q
11	3	Soulatiou Saka	Benin	54.25	Q
12	3	Justine Palframan	South Africa	54.30	Q
13	4	Fatou Gaye	Senegal	54.40	q
14	2	Kadija Ouardi	Morocco	54.48	Q
15	4	Marcelle Bouele Bondo	Republic of the Congo	54.56	q
16	3	Nafy Mane	Senegal	54.62	q
17	2	Nevian Mongina	Kenya	54.65	
18	4	Galefele Moroko	Botswana	54.90	
19	4	Ngouyaka Angounou	Cameroon	55.00	
20	1	Worknesh Mesele	Ethiopia	55.12	
21	2	Tjipekapora Herunga	Namibia	55.90	
22	4	Abygirl Sepiso	Zambia	56.10	
23	2	Goitseone Seleka	Botswana	56.17	
24	1	Mariama Mamoudou Ittatou	Niger	56.52	
25	3	Faith Dube	Zimbabwe	56.54	
26	3	Firezewid Tesfaye	Ethiopia	57.06	
27	2	Adele Mafogan	Cameroon	57.57	
	1	Emerald Egwim	Nigeria	DNS	

=== Semifinals ===
Qualification: First 3 of each semifinal (Q) and the next 2 fastest (q) qualified for the final.

Rank	Heat	Name	Nationality	Time	Notes
1	1	Yinka Ajayi	Nigeria	51.43	Q
2	2	Caster Semenya	South Africa	51.87	Q
3	1	Christine Botlogetswe	Botswana	52.24	Q
4	1	Leni Shida	Uganda	52.42	Q
5	2	Patience Okon George	Nigeria	52.81	Q
6	1	Quincy Malekani	Zambia	52.96	q
7	2	Margaret Barrie	Sierra Leone	53.14	Q
8	2	Veronica Mutua	Kenya	53.87	q
9	1	Soulatiou Saka	Benin	54.06	
10	1	Fatou Gaye	Senegal	54.22	
11	2	Frehiywot Wondie	Ethiopia	54.39	
12	2	Marcelle Bouele Bondo	Republic of the Congo	54.77	
13	2	Kadija Ouardi	Morocco	54.91	
14	2	Nafy Mane	Senegal	55.46	
15	1	Justine Palframan	South Africa	57.11	
	1	Maximila Imali	Kenya	DNF	

=== Final ===
Rank	Lane	Athlete	Nationality	Time	Notes
1st place, gold medalist(s)	4	Caster Semenya	South Africa	49.96	
2nd place, silver medalist(s)	3	Christine Botlogetswe	Botswana	51.19	
3rd place, bronze medalist(s)	6	Yinka Ajayi	Nigeria	51.34	
4	7	Margaret Barrie	Sierra Leone	52.06	
5	5	Patience Okon George	Nigeria	52.34	
6	8	Leni Shida	Uganda	52.78	
7	1	Veronica Mutua	Kenya	53.27	
8	2	Quincy Malekani	Zambia	54.10	
