= 2014 African Championships in Athletics – Women's 4 × 400 metres relay =

The women's 4 × 400 metres relay event at the 2014 African Championships in Athletics was held on August 14 on Stade de Marrakech.

== Results ==
Rank	Nation	Competitors	Time	Notes
1st place, gold medalist(s)	Nigeria	Patience Okon George, Regina George, Ada Benjamin, Folashade Abugan	3:28.87	
2nd place, silver medalist(s)	Kenya	Jacinter Shikanda, Francisca Koki, Janeth Jepkosgei, Maureen Jelagat	3:32.26	
3rd place, bronze medalist(s)	Botswana	Goitseone Seleka, Lydia Mashila, Loungo Matlhaku, Christine Botlogetswe	3:40.28	
4	Ghana	Rashidatu Abubakar, Vivian Mills, Shawkia Iddrisu, Janet Amponsah	3:42.89	
5	Cameroon	Marie Jeanne Eba, Irene Bell Bonong, Liliane Nguetsa, Audrey Nkamsao	3:43.59	
6	Ethiopia	Fantu Magiso, Chaltu Shumi, Gadese Ejara, Kore Tola	3:46.91	
	Morocco		DNS	
