= Fatoumata Diop =

Senegalese sprinter

Fatoumata Diop (born 10 August 1986) is a Senegalese sprinter specialising in the 200 and 400 metres.

Her personal bests are 24.05 seconds in the 200 metres (+0.1 m/s, Brazzaville 2015) and 52.79 seconds in the 400 metres (Brazzaville 2015).

== Competition record ==
Year	Competition	Venue	Position	Event	Notes
Representing Senegal
2005	African Junior Championships	Radès, Tunisia	7th	200 m	25.86
2005	African Junior Championships	Radès, Tunisia	3rd	4 × 400 m relay	3:48.85
2011	Universiade	Shenzhen, China	43rd (h)	200 m	25.42
2011	Universiade	Shenzhen, China	26th (h)	400 m	56.65
2011	Universiade	Shenzhen, China	7th	4 × 400 m relay	3:43.15
2013	Universiade	Kazan, Russia	18th (sf)	200 m	24.24
2013	Universiade	Kazan, Russia	15th (sf)	400 m	55.19
2013	Jeux de la Francophonie	Nice, France	6th	200 m	25.09
2013	Jeux de la Francophonie	Nice, France	10th (h)	400 m	55.04
2014	African Championships	Marrakesh, Morocco	10th (h)	400 m	53.95
2014	African Championships	Marrakesh, Morocco	–	4 × 100 m relay	DNF
2015	African Games	Brazzaville, Republic of the Congo	15th (sf)	200 m	24.18
2015	African Games	Brazzaville, Republic of the Congo	10th (sf)	400 m	52.79
2016	African Championships	Durban, South Africa	10th (sf)	400 m	53.31
