= Lydia Jele =

Botswana sprinter (born 1990)

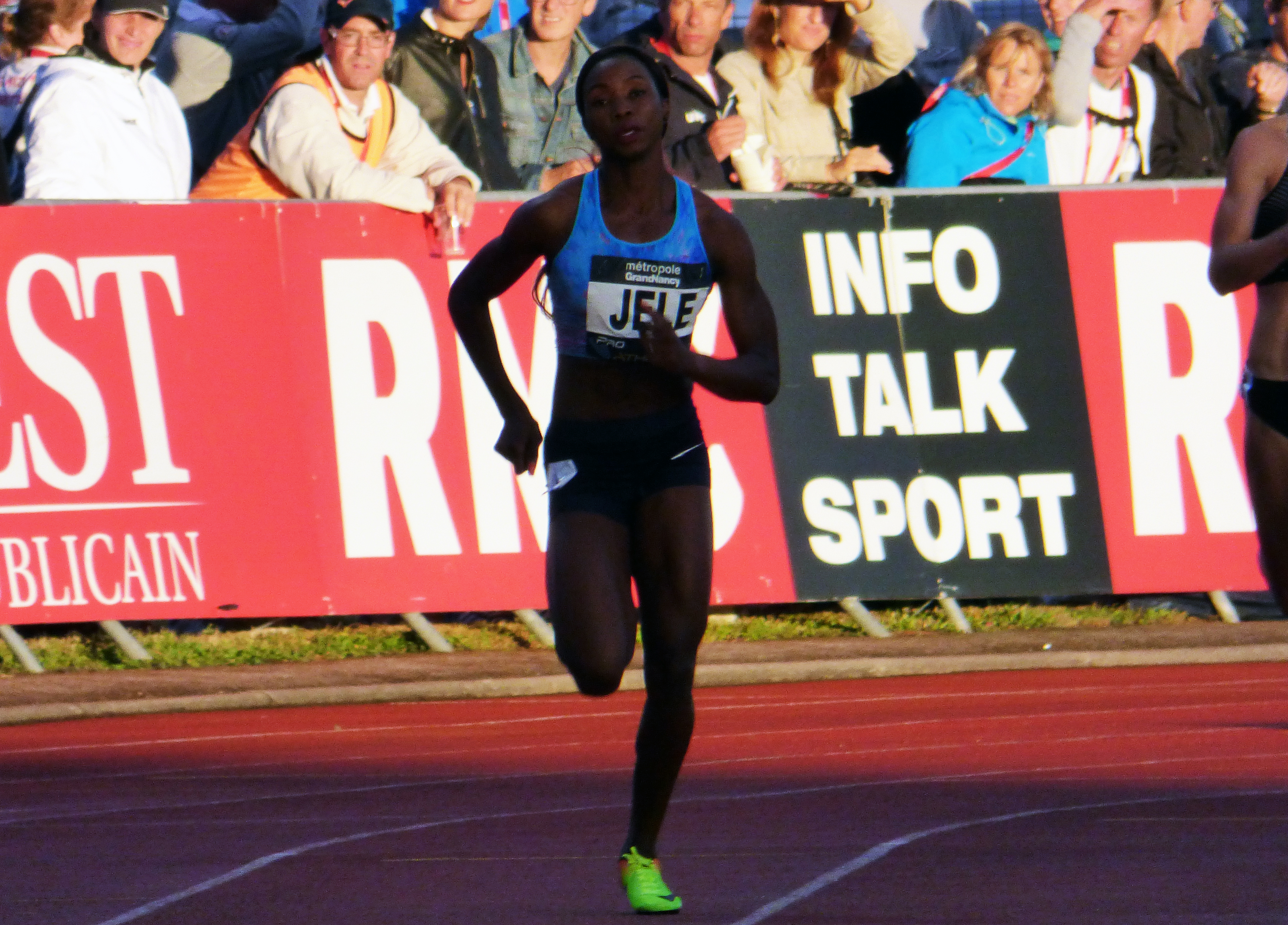

Personal information
- Born: 22 June 1990 (age 36)
- Education: Generalitat Valenciana Conselleria D'educacio
- Height: 1.72 m (5 ft 8 in)

Sport
- Sport: Track and field
- Events: 200 metres, 400 metres
Medal record
Women's athletics
Representing Botswana
African Games
Silver medal – second place	2015 Brazzaville	4x400 m
Silver medal – second place	2023 Accra	Mixed 4x400 m
Bronze medal – third place	2023 Accra	4x400 m
African Championships
Silver medal – second place	2012 Porto-Novo	4x400 m
Bronze medal – third place	2014 Marrakesh	4x400 m

Lydia Casey Jele (née Mashila; born 22 June 1990) is a Botswana athlete competing primarily in the 400 metres. She participated in the relay at the 2013 World Championships without qualifying for the final. She ran the 400 meters at the 2016 Summer Olympics. She qualified by winning the Botswana Athletics Association Championships.

Her personal bests are 11.51 in the 100 metres, 24.55 in the 200 metres (-0.1 m/s, Shenzhen 2011) and 52.65 in the 400 metres (Porto-Novo 2012). Jele is a Latter-day Saint.

== Competition record ==
Year	Competition	Venue	Position	Event	Notes
Representing Botswana
2010	Commonwealth Games	Delhi, India	6th	4 × 400 m relay	3:38.44
2011	Universiade	Shenzhen, China	27th (sf)	200 m	24.77
2011	Universiade	Shenzhen, China	21st (sf)	400 m	55.06
2011	All-Africa Games	Maputo, Mozambique	18th (h)	400 m	57.68
2012	African Championships	Porto-Novo, Benin	11th (sf)	400 m	53.60
2012	African Championships	Porto-Novo, Benin	2nd	4 × 400 m relay	3:31.27
2013	Universiade	Kazan, Russia	12th (sf)	400 m	53.57
2013	World Championships	Moscow, Russia	16th (h)	4 × 400 m relay	3:38.96
2014	African Championships	Marrakesh, Morocco	7th	200 m	23.77
2014	African Championships	Marrakesh, Morocco	9th (h)	400 m	53.37
2014	African Championships	Marrakesh, Morocco	3rd	4 × 400 m relay	3:40.28
2015	IAAF World Relays	Nassau, Bahamas	13th	4 × 400 m relay	3:35.76
2015	African Games	Brazzaville, Republic of the Congo	8th	400 m	53.85
2015	African Games	Brazzaville, Republic of the Congo	2nd	4 × 400 m relay	3:32.84
2016	African Championships	Durban, South Africa	4th	400 m	52.41
2016	African Championships	Durban, South Africa	4th	4 × 400 m relay	3:31.54
2016	Olympic Games	Rio de Janeiro, Brazil	27th (h)	400 m	52.24
2017	IAAF World Relays	Nassau, Bahamas	6th	4 × 400 m relay	3:30.13
2017	World Championships	London, United Kingdom	13th (sf)	400 m	51.57
2017	World Championships	London, United Kingdom	7th	4 × 400 m relay	3:28.00
2022	African Championships	Port Louis, Mauritius	6th	400 m	53.58
2023	World Championships	Budapest, Hungary	14th (h)	4 × 400 m relay	3:31.85
2024	African Games	Accra, Ghana	7th	400 m	53.05
2024	African Games	Accra, Ghana	3rd	4 × 400 m relay	3:33.44
2024	African Championships	Douala, Cameroon	5th	400 m	52.72
2024	African Championships	Douala, Cameroon	4th	4 × 400 m relay	3:33.13
