= Alyona Mamina =

Russian sprinter

Alyona Aleksandrovna Mamina (née Tamkova) (Russian: Алёна Александровна Мамина (Тамкова); born Mai 30, 1990 in Sverdlovsk) is a Russian track and field sprinter who specialises in the 400 metres.

== Achievements ==
Year	Competition	Venue	Position	Event	Notes
Representing Russia
2008	World Junior Championships	Bydgoszcz, Poland	11th	4 × 100 m	45.15
2009	European Junior Championships	Novi Sad, Serbia	2nd	200 m	23.72
2011	European U23 Championships	Ostrava, Czech Republic	1st	4 × 100 m	44.14
2013	Universiade	Kazan, Russia	1st	4 × 400 m relay	3:26.61
2013	Universiade	Kazan, Russia	2nd	400 m	51.17
2014	World Indoor Championships	Sopot, Poland	DSQ (4th)	4 × 400 m relay	DSQ (3:28.39)
2014	European Championships	Zürich, Switzerland	4th	4 × 100 m	3:25.02
2014	European Team Championships	Braunschweig, Germany	1st	4 00 m	51.72
2015	European Team Championships	Cheboksary, Russia	1st	4 × 400 m	3:24.98
