= Morgan Mitchell =

Australian sprinter

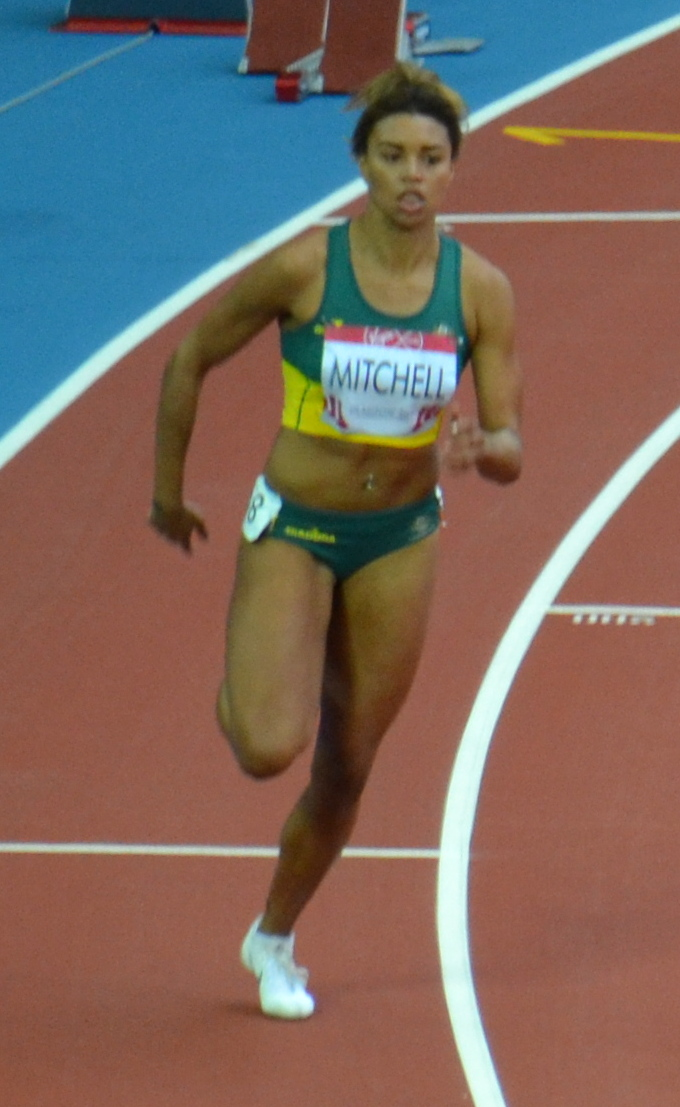
- Morgan Mitchell in 2014

Personal information
- Born: 3 October 1994 (age 32) Carlton, Victoria, Australia

Sport
- Sport: Athletics
- Events: 400 metres, 800 metres

Morgan Mitchell (born 3 October 1994) is an Australian athlete who specialized in the 400 metres and now competes in the 800 metres.

== Early life ==
Mitchell started athletics in 2000, inspired by the success of compatriot Cathy Freeman at the Sydney Olympics, but stopped at the age of 12 to concentrate on netball. She represented Australia on junior level before returning to athletics in 2012.

Mitchell's father is an African American former professional basketball player who moved from the United States to Australia, and her mother is Australian.

Mitchell competed on Australian Survivor: Brains V Brawn II in 2025, where she placed 6th.

== Career ==
Mitchell competed in the 4 × 400 metres relay event at the 2015 World Championships in Beijing without advancing to the final. She represented Australia in the Women's 400m and Women's 4 × 400 m Relay at the 2016 Summer Olympics. Her personal best in the 400 metres is 51.25 seconds set in Birmingham in 2016.

In 2019, Mitchell switched focus to the 800 metres, rapidly improving to her current personal best of 2:00.06.

As part of her switch in event, Elizabeth Mathews became her coach and Mitchell began running 60–70 km a week rather than the 15 km per week she had done for sprinting previously.

Mitchell competed in the 2020 Tokyo Olympic Games. She came sixth in her Women's 800m heat with a time of 2:05.44 and was therefore eliminated.

Mitchell took part in the 2024 Summer Olympics. She was named F45's Global Athlete for Australia. She has been vegan for over a decade and attributes much of her success to her vegan diet.

== International competitions ==
Year	Competition	Venue	Position	Event	Notes
Representing Australia
2012	World Junior Championships	Barcelona, Spain	13th (sf)	400 m	53.88
2012	World Junior Championships	Barcelona, Spain	8th	4 × 400 m relay	3:38.84
2014	World Relays	Nassau, Bahamas	1st (B)	4 × 400 m relay	3:31.01
2014	Commonwealth Games	Glasgow, United Kingdom	17th (sf)	400 m	53.37
2014	Commonwealth Games	Glasgow, United Kingdom	4th	4 × 400 m relay	3:30.27
2015	World Relays	Nassau, Bahamas	7th	4 × 400 m relay	3:30.03
2015	World Championships	Beijing, China	12th (h)	4 × 400 m relay	3:28.61
2016	Olympic Games	Rio de Janeiro, Brazil	24th (sf)	400 m	52.68
2016	Olympic Games	Rio de Janeiro, Brazil	8th	4 × 400 m relay	3:27.45
2017	World Relays	Nassau, Bahamas	5th	4 × 400 m relay	3:28.80
2017	World Championships	London, United Kingdom	26th (h)	400 m	52.22
2017	World Championships	London, United Kingdom	10th (h)	4 × 400 m relay	3:28.02
2018	Commonwealth Games	Gold Coast, Australia	12th (sf)	400 metres	52.65
2018	Commonwealth Games	Gold Coast, Australia	5th	4 × 400 m relay	3:27.43
2019	World Relays	Yokohama, Japan	5th (B)	4 × 400 m relay	3:32.22
2019	Universiade	Naples, Italy	8th	800 m	2:04.19
2019	Universiade	Naples, Italy	3rd	4 × 400 m relay	3:34.01
2019	World Championships	Doha, Qatar	22nd (sf)	800 m	2:04.76
2021	Olympic Games	Tokyo, Japan	40th (h)	800 m	2:05.44
