= 2015 IAAF World Relays – Women's 4 × 400 metres relay =

Women's 4 × 400 metres relay at the 2015 IAAF World Relays
- Venue: Thomas Robinson Stadium
- Dates: 2 May (heats) & 3 May (final)
- Nations: 17
- Winning time: 3:19.39

Medalists
gold medal	Phyllis Francis; Natasha Hastings; Sanya Richards-Ross; Francena McCorory; United States
silver medal	Anastasia Le-Roy; Novlene Williams-Mills; Christine Day; Stephenie Ann McPherson; Jamaica
bronze medal	Eilidh Child; Anyika Onuora; Kelly Massey; Seren Bundy-Davies; Great Britain

The women's 4 × 400 metres relay at the 2015 IAAF World Relays was held at the Thomas Robinson Stadium on 2–3 May.

== Records ==
Prior to the competition, the records were as follows:

World record	Soviet Union (Tatyana Ledovskaya, Olga Nazarova, Mariya Pinigina, Olga Bryzgina)	3:15.17	Seoul, South Korea	1 October 1988
Championship record	United States (DeeDee Trotter, Sanya Richards-Ross, Natasha Hastings, Joanna Atkins)	3:21.73	(The Bahamas) Nassau, Bahamas	25 May 2014
World Leading	Jamaica (Christine Day, Patricia Hall, Anastasia Leroy, Stephenie-Ann McPherson	3:26.58	Philadelphia, United States	25 April 2015
African record	Nigeria (Olabisi Afolabi, Fatima Yusuf, Charity Opara, Falilat Ogunkoya)	3:21.04	Atlanta, United States	3 August 1996
Asian record	(China) Hebei province (An Xiaohong, Bai Xiaoyun, Cao Chunying, Ma Yuqin)	3:24.28	Beijing, China	13 September 1993
North, Central American and Caribbean record	United States (Denean Howard, Diane Dixon, Valerie Brisco-Hooks, Florence Griffith Joyner)	3:15.51	Seoul, South Korea	1 October 1988
South American record	(Brazil) BM&F Bovespa (Geisa Aparecida Coutinho, Bárbara de Oliveira, Joelma Sousa, Jailma de Lima)	3:26.68	São Paulo, Brazil	7 August 2011
European record	Soviet Union (Tatyana Ledovskaya, Olga Nazarova, Mariya Pinigina, Olga Bryzgina)	3:15.17	Seoul, South Korea	1 October 1988
Oceanian record	Australia (Nova Peris, Tamsyn Manou, Melinda Gainsford-Taylor, Cathy Freeman)	3:23.81	Sydney, Australia	30 September 2000

== Schedule ==
Date	Time	Round
2 May 2015	20:31	Heats
3 May 2015	20:15	Final B
3 May 2015	20:27	Final

All times are local times (UTC−4)

== Results ==
KEY:	q	Fastest non-qualifiers	Q	Qualified	WL	World leading	NR	National record	SB	Seasonal best

=== Heats ===
Qualification: First 2 of each heat (Q) plus the 2 fastest times (q) advanced to the final.

Rank	Heat	Lane	Nation	Athletes	Time	Notes
1	3	6	United States	DeeDee Trotter, Natasha Hastings, Phyllis Francis, Jessica Beard	3:24.05	Q, WL
2	2	4	Jamaica	Anastasia Le-Roy, Natoya Goule, Christine Day, Stephenie Ann McPherson	3:26.41	Q, WL
3	2	3	Great Britain	Eilidh Child, Anyika Onuora, Shana Cox, Seren Bundy-Davies	3:28.51	Q
4	2	2	Brazil	Joelma Sousa, Jailma de Lima, Liliane Fernandes, Geisa Coutinho	3:29.38	q, SB
5	3	5	Poland	Ewelina Ptak, Małgorzata Hołub, Joanna Linkiewicz, Justyna Święty	3:30.32	Q, SB
6	3	7	Canada	Nicole Sassine, Wendy Fawn Dorr, Carline Muir, Audrey Jean-Baptiste	3:30.64	q, SB
7	1	2	Australia	Caitlin Sargent, Jessica Gulli, Anneliese Rubie, Morgan Mitchell	3:30.73	Q, SB
8	1	7	France	Marie Gayot, Lénora Guion-Firmin, Agnès Raharolahy, Floria Gueï	3:30.95	Q, SB
9	1	4	Cuba	Lisneidy Veitia, Yameisi Borlot, Zurian Hechavarría, Daisurami Bonne	3:31.43	SB
10	1	3	Nigeria	Rita Ossai, Patience Okon George, Ibukun Blessing Mayungbe, Ngozi Onwumere	3:32.16	
11	2	5	Japan	Seika Aoyama, Asami Chiba, Sayaka Aoki, Kana Ichikawa	3:32.79	SB
12	2	7	Bahamas	Brianca Farrington, Shaquania Dorsett, Katrina Seymour, Christine Amertil	3:33.60	SB
13	3	3	Trinidad and Tobago	Janeil Bellille, Magnolia Howell, Romona Modeste, Alena Brooks	3:36.69	SB
14	1	5	Botswana	Goitseone Seleka, Lydia Jele, Loungo Matlhaku, Christine Botlogetswe	3:39.42	SB
15	2	6	Venezuela	Nercely Soto, Wilmary Álvarez, Magdalena Mendoza, Nediam Vargas	3:40.54	SB
16	1	6	Namibia	Tjipekapora Herunga, Globine Mayova, Mberihonga Kandovasu, Lilianne Klaasman	3:41.47	NR
	3	4	Italy	Chiara Bazzoni, Libania Grenot, Elena Maria Bonfanti, Maria Benedicta Chigbolu	DQ	170.6

=== Final B ===
The final B was started at 20:20.

Rank	Lane	Nation	Athletes	Time	Notes
1	6	Cuba	Lisneidy Veitia, Yameisi Borlot, Zurian Hechavarría, Daisurami Bonne	3:30.94	SB
2	4	Japan	Seika Aoyama, Asami Chiba, Sayaka Aoki, Manami Kira	3:34.65	
3	3	Bahamas	Brianca Farrington, Christine Amertil, D'Nia Freeman, Katrina Seymour	3:35.01	
4	7	Trinidad and Tobago	Romona Modeste, Janeil Bellille, Magnolia Howell, Josanne Lucas	3:35.23	SB
5	8	Botswana	Lydia Jele, Loungo Matlhaku, Goitseone Seleka, Christine Botlogetswe	3:35.76	SB
6	1	Namibia	Tjipekapora Herunga, Globine Mayova, Mberihonga Kandovasu, Lilianne Klaasman	3:40.21	NR
	5	Nigeria		DNS	
	2	Venezuela		DNS	

=== Final ===
The final was started at 20:32.

Rank	Lane	Nation	Athletes	Time	Notes
1st place, gold medalist(s)	4	United States	Phyllis Francis, Natasha Hastings, Sanya Richards-Ross, Francena McCorory	3:19.39	CR
2nd place, silver medalist(s)	6	Jamaica	Anastasia Le-Roy, Novlene Williams-Mills, Christine Day, Stephenie Ann McPherson	3:22.49	SB
3rd place, bronze medalist(s)	5	Great Britain	Eilidh Child, Anyika Onuora, Kelly Massey, Seren Bundy-Davies	3:26.38	SB
4	8	France	Lénora Guion-Firmin, Marie Gayot, Elea-Mariama Diarra, Floria Gueï	3:26.68	SB
5	7	Poland	Ewelina Ptak, Małgorzata Hołub, Joanna Linkiewicz, Justyna Święty	3:29.30	SB
6	2	Canada	Nicole Sassine, Wendy Fawn Dorr, Carline Muir, Audrey Jean-Baptiste	3:29.65	SB
7	3	Australia	Anneliese Rubie, Jessica Gulli, Morgan Mitchell, Lyndsay Pekin	3:30.03	SB
8	1	Brazil	Joelma Sousa, Jailma de Lima, Liliane Fernandes, Geisa Coutinho	3:31.30	
