= Christine Day =

Jamaican sprinter (born 1986)

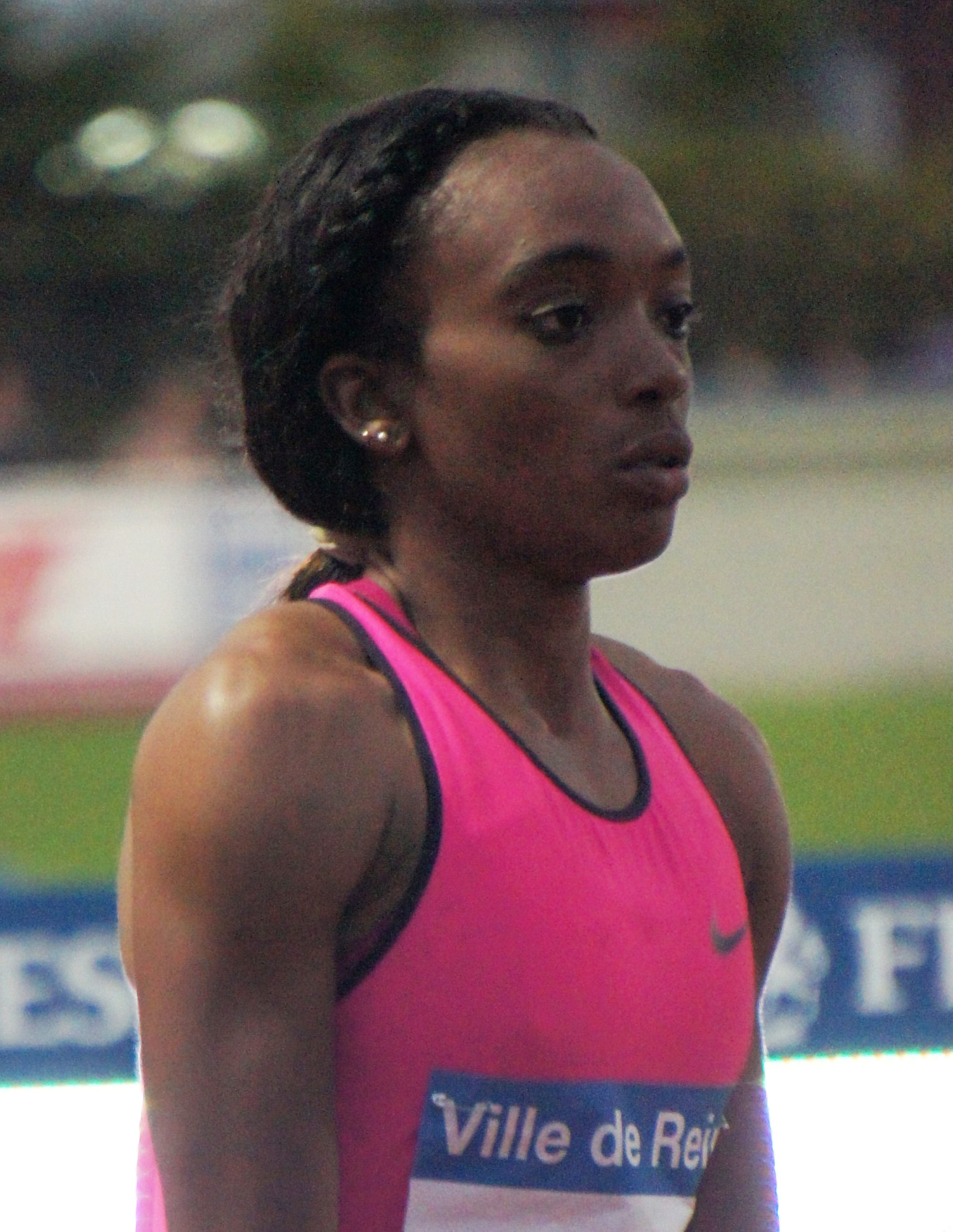

Personal information
- Born: 23 August 1986 (age 40) Saint Mary Parish, Jamaica
- Height: 1.68 m (5 ft 6 in)
- Weight: 51 kg (112 lb)

Sport
- Country: Jamaica
- Sport: Athletics
- Event: 4 × 400 m Relay
Medal record
Olympic Games
Silver medal – second place	2012 London	4 × 400 m relay
Silver medal – second place	2016 Rio de Janeiro	4 × 400 m relay
World Championships
Gold medal – first place	2015 Beijing	4 × 400 m relay
Commonwealth Games
Gold medal – first place	2014 Glasgow	4 × 400 m relay
Gold medal – first place	2018 Gold Coast	4 × 400 m relay
Bronze medal – third place	2014 Glasgow	400 m
Representing Americas
Continental Cup
Gold medal – first place	2014 Marrakech	4 × 400 m relay

Christine Day (born 23 August 1986) is a Jamaican sprinter who specializes in the 400 metres. She represented Jamaica at the 2012 Summer Olympics in the individual 400 m and in the 4 × 400 metre relay. Day was eliminated in the semifinals of the individual 400 m but she and teammates Rosemarie Whyte, Shericka Williams and Novlene Williams-Mills won bronze in the relay.

Day won a bronze medal at the 2014 Glasgow in the women's 400 m behind teammates Stephanie McPherson and Novlene Williams-Mills. She along with Williams-Mills, McPherson and Anastasia Le-Roy won gold in the 4 × 400 metres women team and helped them in setting a games' record of 3 minutes 23.82 seconds (3:23.82) at the 2014 Commonwealth Games.

== International competitions ==
Year	Competition	Venue	Position	Event	Notes
Representing Jamaica
2008	NACAC U23 Championships	Toluca, Mexico	1st	4 × 400 m relay	3:27.46
2009	World Championships	Berlin, Germany	23rd (sf)	400 m	53.46
2012	Olympic Games	London, United Kingdom	10th (sf)	400 m	51.19
2012	Olympic Games	London, United Kingdom	2nd	4 × 400 m relay	3:20.95
2013	World Championships	Moscow, Russia	–	4 × 400 m relay	DQ
2014	World Relays	Nassau, Bahamas	2nd (h)	4 × 400 m relay	3:24.95
2014	Commonwealth Games	Glasgow, United Kingdom	3rd	400 m	51.09
2014	Commonwealth Games	Glasgow, United Kingdom	1st	4 × 400 m relay	3:23.82
2014	Continental Cup	Marrakesh, Morocco	1st	4 × 400 m relay	3:20.93^{1}
2015	World Relays	Nassau, Bahamas	2nd	4 × 400 m relay	3:22.49
2015	World Championships	Beijing, China	4th	400 m	50.14
2015	World Championships	Beijing, China	1st	4 × 400 m relay	3:19.13
2016	Olympic Games	Rio de Janeiro, Brazil	15th (sf)	400 m	51.53
2016	Olympic Games	Rio de Janeiro, Brazil	2nd (h)	4 × 400 m relay	3:22.38
2017	World Relays	Nassau, Bahamas	3rd (h)	4 × 400 m relay	3:29.93
2018	Commonwealth Games	Gold Coast, Australia	1st	4 × 400 m relay	3:24.00
2018	NACAC Championships	Toronto, Canada	5th	400 m	53.04
2018	NACAC Championships	Toronto, Canada	2nd	4 × 400 m relay	3:27.25
2019	World Relays	Yokohama, Japan	5th (h)	4 × 400 m relay	3:28.80

^{1}Representing the Americas
