= Djénébou Danté =

Malian sprinter (born 1989)

Personal information
- Nationality: Malian
- Born: Djénébou Danté; 7 August 1989 (age 36)

Sport
- Sport: Athletics
- Events: 100 metres, 400 metres

Djénébou Danté (born 7 August 1989) is a Malian athlete specialising in the sprinting events. She represented her country in the 100 metres at the 2011 World Championships.

She competed in the Women's 400 metres at the 2016 Summer Olympics in Rio de Janeiro. She placed 5th in her heat with a time of 52.85 seconds. She was the flagbearer for Mali during the Parade of Nations. She won the gold medal at the 2017 Francophony Games with the time of 52.23 seconds.

She competed in the women's 100 metres at the 2020 Summer Olympics.

== Competition record ==
| Year | Competition | Venue | Position | Event | Notes |
Representing Mali
| 2005 | World Youth Championships | Marrakesh, Morocco | 72nd (h) | 100 m | 12.70 |
| 2005 | World Youth Championships | Marrakesh, Morocco | 51st (h) | 200 m | 25.77 |
| 2006 | World Junior Championships | Beijing, China | 45th (h) | 200 m | 25.25 |
| 2011 | World Championships | Daegu, South Korea | 47th (h) | 100 m | 12.31 |
| 2011 | All-Africa Games | Maputo, Mozambique | 20th (h) | 100 m | 12.48 |
| 2011 | All-Africa Games | Maputo, Mozambique | 17th (h) | 200 m | 25.17 |
| 2014 | African Championships | Marrakesh, Morocco | 16th (h) | 200 m | 24.75 |
| 2014 | African Championships | Marrakesh, Morocco | 7th | 400 m | 54.34 |
| 2015 | African Games | Brazzaville, Republic of the Congo | 7th | 400 m | 53.41 |
| 2016 | World Indoor Championships | Portland, United States | 15th (h) | 400 m | 55.76 |
| 2016 | African Championships | Durban, South Africa | 5th | 400 m | 52.65 |
| 2016 | Olympic Games | Rio de Janeiro, Brazil | 42nd (h) | 400 m | 52.85 |
| 2017 | Islamic Solidarity Games | Baku, Azerbaijan | 4th | 400 m | 53.94 |
| 2017 | Jeux de la Francophonie | Abidjan, Ivory Coast | 1st | 400 m | 52.23 |
| 2017 | World Championships | London, United Kingdom | 48th (h) | 400 m | 54.04 |
| 2018 | World Indoor Championships | Birmingham, United Kingdom | 31st (h) | 400 m | 57.85 |
| 2021 | Olympic Games | Tokyo, Japan | 11th (p) | 100 m | 12.12 |

== Personal bests ==
Outdoor

- 100 metres – 11.98 (+0.6 m/s) (Bruay la Buissiere, France 2015)
- 200 metres – 23.84 (+1.0 m/s) (Bruay la Buissiere, France 2015)
- 400 metres – 52.16 (Marseille, France 16/07/2017) NR

Olympic Games
| Preceded by Rahamatou Drame | Flagbearer for Mali; 2016 Rio de Janeiro | Succeeded by Seydou Fofana |
