= Yinka Ajayi =

Nigerian sprinter (born 1997)

Personal information
- Born: 11 August 1997 (age 29) Offa, Kwara State, Nigeria
- Height: 1.70 m (5 ft 7 in)
- Weight: 59 kg (130 lb)

Sport
- Country: Nigeria
- Sport: Athletics
- Sprint: 400 m

Achievements and titles
- Highest world ranking: 58
- Personal best: 400 m: 51.22 s (2018)
Medal record
Women's Athletics
Representing Nigeria
Commonwealth Games
Silver medal – second place	2018 Gold Coast	4x400 m
African Championships
Gold medal – first place	2018 Asaba	4x400 m
Silver medal – second place	2016 Durban	4x400 m
Bronze medal – third place	2018 Asaba	400 m
African U20 Championships
Gold medal – first place	2015 Addis Ababa	4x400 m
- Updated on 28 February 2019

Yinka Ajayi (born 11 August 1997) is a Nigerian sprinter specialising in the 400 metres. She was the bronze medalists at the 2018 African Championships in Asaba. Individually, she also won a bronze medal at the 2017 Islamic Solidarity Games, in addition to several relay medals. She is also sister to Miami Dolphins Running Back; Jay Ajayi.

She was a finalist in the 400 metres at the 2018 Commonwealth Games and went on to anchor the Nigerian 4 × 400 m relay quartet (Patience George, Glory Nathaniel, Praise Idamadudu, Ajayi) to a silver medal behind Jamaica.

She finished second at the 2017 Nigerian Championships in a then personal best of 51.57 s behind Patience George. She made the semifinals of the 400 metres at the 2017 IAAF World Championships. Her personal best in the event is 51.22 seconds set in Abuja at the 2018 Abuja Golden League.

In 2021, she became the first woman in the history of Drake University to represent the school in track and field at the Olympic Games.

Ajayi is currently serving an eight-year competition ban (the initial four years and four more years added in 2024) set to end in January 2030 for an anti-doping rule violation after testing positive for metenolone in December 2021.

== International competitions ==
Year	Competition	Venue	Position	Event	Notes
Representing Nigeria
2014	World Junior Championships	Eugene, United States	5th	4 × 400 m relay	3:35.14
2015	African Junior Championships	Addis Ababa, Ethiopia	1st	4 × 400 m relay	3:38.94
2016	African Championships	Durban, South Africa	11th (sf)	400 m	53.54
2016	African Championships	Durban, South Africa	2nd	4 × 400 m relay	3:29.94
2017	Islamic Solidarity Games	Baku, Azerbaijan	3rd	400 m	52.57
2017	Islamic Solidarity Games	Baku, Azerbaijan	2nd	4 × 100 m relay	46.20
2017	Islamic Solidarity Games	Baku, Azerbaijan	2nd	4 × 400 m relay	3:34.47
2017	World Championships	London, United Kingdom	19th (sf)	400 m	52.10
2017	World Championships	London, United Kingdom	5th	4 × 400 m relay	3:26.72
2018	Commonwealth Games	Gold Coast, Australia	8th	400 m	52.26
2018	Commonwealth Games	Gold Coast, Australia	2nd	4 × 400 m relay	3:25.29
2018	African Championships	Asaba, Nigeria	3rd	400 m	51.34
2018	African Championships	Asaba, Nigeria	1st	4 × 400 m relay	3:31.17
2019	World Relays	Yokohama, Japan	18th (h)	4 × 400 m relay	3:32.10
