= Jacinter Shikanda =

Kenyan sprinter

Personal information
- Born: 14 July 1986 (age 39) Lugari, Kenya
- Height: 1.65 m (5 ft 5 in)
- Weight: 68 kg (150 lb)

Sport
- Sport: Track and field
Medal record
Women's athletics
Representing Kenya
African Championships
Silver medal – second place	2014 Marrakesh	4×400 m
Bronze medal – third place	2016 Durban	4×400 m
- Updated on 27 August 2016

Jacinter Shikanda (born 14 July 1986) is a Kenyan sprinter. She competed in the women's 400m at the 2014 Commonwealth Games. She also competed in the Women's 400 metres event at the 2015 World Championships in Athletics in Beijing but was disqualified in her heat.

Her personal best in the event is 52.29 set in Nairobi in 2015.

== International competitions ==
Year	Competition	Venue	Position	Event	Notes
Representing Kenya
2014	Commonwealth Games	Glasgow, United Kingdom	26th (h)	400 m	54.81
2014	Commonwealth Games	Glasgow, United Kingdom	11th (h)	4 × 400 m relay	3:37.45
2014	African Championships	Marrakesh, Morocco	11th (h)	400 m	54.25
2014	African Championships	Marrakesh, Morocco	4th	4 × 100 m relay	46.06
2014	African Championships	Marrakesh, Morocco	2nd	4 × 400 m relay	3:32.26
2015	World Championships	Beijing, China	–	400 m	DQ
2017	IAAF World Relays	Nassau, Bahamas	4th (B)	4 × 400 m relay	3:40.98
2022	African Championships	Port Louis, Mauritius	14th (sf)	400 m	56.78
