= Maureen Jelagat Maiyo =

Kenyan hurdler (born 1985)

Personal information
- Born: 28 May 1985 (age 41) Kapsowar, Kenya
- Height: 1.67 m (5 ft 5 1/2 in)
- Weight: 58 kg (128 lb)

Sport
- Country: Kenya
- Sport: Athletics
- Events: 400m Hurdles, 400m
Medal record
Women's athletics
Representing Kenya
African Championships
Silver medal – second place	2010 Nairobi	4×400 m
Silver medal – second place	2014 Marrakesh	4×400 m
Silver medal – second place	2016 Durban	400 m hurdles
Bronze medal – third place	2010 Nairobi	400 m hurdles
Bronze medal – third place	2016 Durban	4×400 m
Bronze medal – third place	2018 Asaba	400 m hurdles

Maureen Jelagat Maiyo (born 28 May 1985) is a Kenyan athlete specialising in the 400 metres and 400 metres hurdles. She represented her country at the 2012 Summer Olympics as well as 2013 and 2015 World Championships.

== International competitions ==
Year	Competition	Venue	Position	Event	Notes
Representing Kenya
2010	African Championships	Nairobi, Kenya	10th (h)	100 m hurdles	15.02
2010	African Championships	Nairobi, Kenya	3rd	400 m hurdles	56.74
2010	African Championships	Nairobi, Kenya	2nd	4 × 400 m relay	3:35.12
2010	Commonwealth Games	Delhi, India	8th (h)	400 m hurdles	59.16^{1}
2010	Commonwealth Games	Delhi, India	9th (h)	4 × 400 m relay	3:39.96
2011	All-Africa Games	Maputo, Mozambique	4th	400 m hurdles	57.49
2012	African Championships	Porto-Novo, Benin	6th	400 m hurdles	56.79
2012	African Championships	Porto-Novo, Benin	6th	4 × 400 m relay	3:35.06
2012	Olympic Games	London, United Kingdom	40th (h)	400 m hurdles	62.16
2013	World Championships	Moscow, Russia	–	400 m	DQ
2014	Commonwealth Games	Glasgow, United Kingdom	15th (sf)	400 m	52.97
2014	African Championships	Marrakesh, Morocco	5th	400 m	52.96
2014	African Championships	Marrakesh, Morocco	2nd	4 × 400 m relay	3:32.26
2015	World Championships	Beijing, China	19th (sf)	400 m	51.92
2016	African Championships	Durban, South Africa	2nd	400 m hurdles	56.12
2016	African Championships	Durban, South Africa	3rd	4 × 400 m relay	3:30.21
2016	Olympic Games	Rio de Janeiro, Brazil	39th (h)	400 m hurdles	57.97
2018	Commonwealth Games	Gold Coast, Australia	13th (h)	400 m hurdles	57.66
2018	African Championships	Asaba, Nigeria	4th	400 m hurdles	57.27
2018	African Championships	Asaba, Nigeria	2nd	4 × 400 m relay	3:35.45

^{1}Disqualified in the final

== Personal bests ==
Outdoor

- 400 metres – 51.40 (Beijing 2015)
- 400 metres hurdles – 56.65 (Nairobi 2011)
