= 2026 African Championships in Athletics – Mixed 4 × 400 metres relay =

Mixed 4 × 400 metres relay at the 2026 African Championships in Athletics
- Venue: Legon Sports Stadium
- Location: Accra, Ghana
- Dates: 13 May
- Winning time: 3:16.44

Medalists
gold medal	Ezekiel Asuquo; Toheebat Jimoh; Victor Sampson; Patience Okon George	Nigeria
silver medal	Leungo Scotch; Kennekae Batisani; Victor Ntweng; Karabo Mantswenyane	Botswana
bronze medal	Samuel Chege Waweru; Lanoline Aoko; Dennis Masika Mulongo; Maureen Najala	Kenya

The men's 4 × 400 metres relay event at the 2026 African Championships in Athletics was held on 13 May in Accra, Ghana.

== Results ==
Rank	Lane	Nation	Competitors	Time	Notes
1st place, gold medalist(s)	3	Nigeria	Ezekiel Asuquo, Toheebat Jimoh, Victor Sampson, Patience Okon George	3:16.44	
2nd place, silver medalist(s)	4	Botswana	Leungo Scotch, Kennekae Batisani, Victor Ntweng, Karabo Mantswenyane	3:17.88	
3rd place, bronze medalist(s)	6	Kenya	Samuel Chege Waweru, Lanoline Aoko, Dennis Masika Mulongo, Maureen Najala	3:17.98	
4	5	Ghana	Solomon Diafo, Florence Agyemang, Godfred Opoku, [[]]	3:18.03	
5	7	Uganda	Godfrey Chanwengo, Maureen Banura, Kenneth Omuka, Monica Akullu	3:20.33	
6	2	Zambia	Patrick Nyambe, [[]], Kennedy Luchembe, Emeldah Kapunjila	3:25.10	
