= Justine Palframan =

South African sprinter (born 1993)

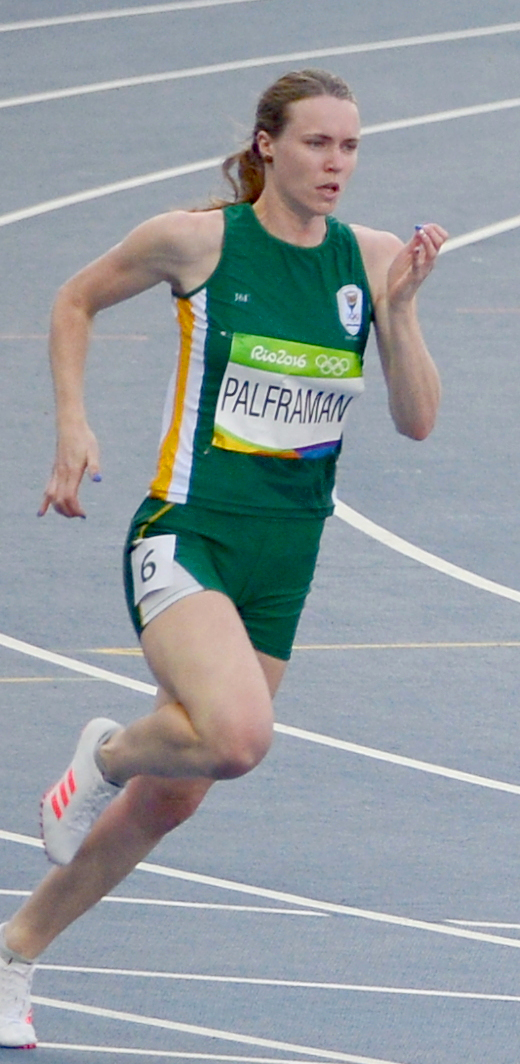
- Palframan at the 2016 Olympics

Personal information
- Born: 4 November 1993 (age 32) Pietermaritzburg, South Africa
- Education: Stellenbosch University
- Height: 1.71 m (5 ft 7 in)
- Weight: 59 kg (130 lb)

Sport
- Sport: Track and field
- Event(s): 200 metres, 400 metres
- Club: Maties Athletics Club, Stellenbosch
- Coached by: Stephen Palframan
Medal record
Women's athletics
Representing South Africa
African Championships
Gold medal – first place	2016 Durban	4×400 m

Justine Palframan (born 4 November 1993) is a South African sprinter specialising in the 200 and 400 metres. She won the 400 m event at the 2015 Summer Universiade. She also represented South Africa at the IAAF 2013 World Championships and 2016 Olympics.

== Personal life ==
Palframan's father Steve and mother Trevlyn are former track athletes, while her sister Katelyn and brother David competed in athletics and swimming. Palframan initially trained in swimming, field hockey, and athletics, and by the age of 16 focused on sprinting.

== Competition record ==
Year	Competition	Venue	Position	Event	Notes
Representing South Africa
2009	World Youth Championships	Brixen, Italy	9th (sf)	200 m	24.17
2009	World Youth Championships	Brixen, Italy	4th	400 m	54.55
2010	World Junior Championships	Moncton, Canada	17th (sf)	200 m	24.09
2011	African Junior Championships	Gaborone, Botswana	2nd	400 m	52.93
2011	African Junior Championships	Gaborone, Botswana	1st	4 × 400 m relay	3:38.16
2012	World Junior Championships	Barcelona, Spain	5th	400 m	51.87
2012	World Junior Championships	Barcelona, Spain	9th	4 × 400 m relay	3:40.31
2013	Universiade	Kazan, Russia	13th (sf)	200 m	23.93
2013	Universiade	Kazan, Russia	17th (h)	400 m	55.43
2013	Universiade	Kazan, Russia	3rd	4 × 400 m relay	3:36.05
2013	World Championships	Moscow, Russia	34th (h)	200 m	23.64
2014	African Championships	Marrakesh, Morocco	4th	200 m	23.27
2014	African Championships	Marrakesh, Morocco	6th	400 m	53.70
2014	Continental Cup	Marrakesh, Morocco	–	4 × 100 m relay	DQ
2015	Universiade	Gwangju, South Korea	1st	400 m	51.27
2015	Universiade	Gwangju, South Korea	6th	4 × 400 m relay	3:46.73
2015	World Championships	Beijing, China	19th (sf)	200 m	23.04
2015	World Championships	Beijing, China	34th (h)	400 m	52.45
2015	African Games	Brazzaville, Republic of the Congo	9th (sf)	400 m	52.75
2016	African Championships	Durban, South Africa	4th	200 m	23.22
2016	African Championships	Durban, South Africa	1st	4 × 400 m relay	3:28.49
2016	Olympic Games	Rio de Janeiro, Brazil	43rd (h)	200 m	23.33
2016	Olympic Games	Rio de Janeiro, Brazil	51st (h)	400 m	53.96
2017	World Championships	London, United Kingdom	15th (sf)	200 m	23.21
2017	World Championships	London, United Kingdom	13th (h)	4 × 400 m relay	3:37.82
2017	Universiade	Taipei, Taiwan	2nd	400 m	51.83
2018	African Championships	Asaba, Nigeria	15th (sf)	400 m	57.11
2019	World Relays	Yokohama, Japan	–	4 × 100 m relay	DNF

== Personal bests ==
Outdoor

- 100 metres – 11.75 (0.0 m/s) (Stellenbosch 2015)
- 200 metres – 22.96 (+1.9 m/s) (Stellenbosch 2015)
- 400 metres – 51.27 (Gwangju 2015)
