= Irene Bell Bonong =

Cameroonian sprinter

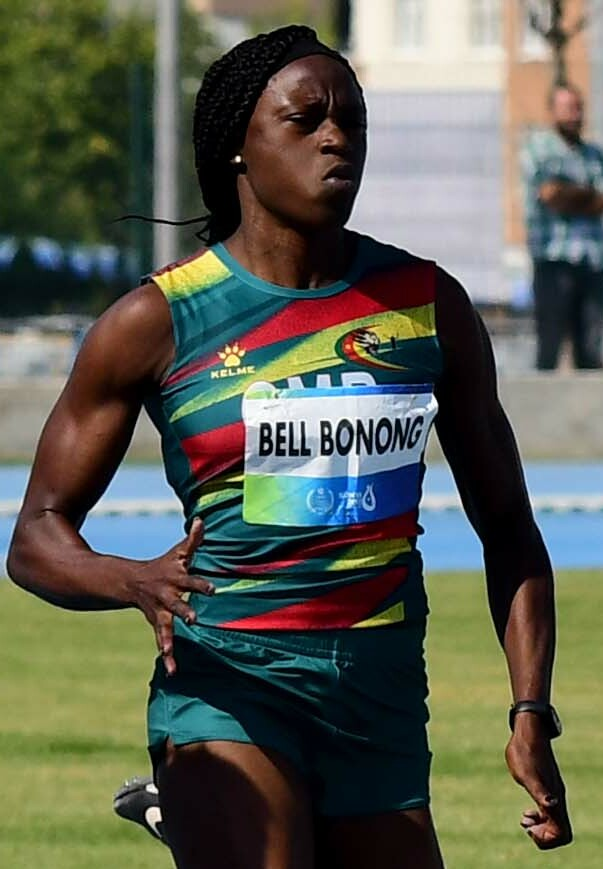

Irene Laure Bell Bonong (born 6 January 1995) is a Cameroonian sprinter.

Bonong competed individually at the 2014 Commonwealth Games (100 and 200 metres) as well as the 2014 African Championships (100 metres) without progressing from the first round.

As a relay runner, Bonong finished fifth at the 2014 African Championships (4 × 400 metres relay), sixth at the 2015 African Games (4 × 100 metres relay, also disqualified in the 4 × 400 metres relay) and sixth at the 2018 Commonwealth Games (4 × 100 metres relay).

In the 100 metres event Bonong broke the 12-second barrier in June 2017, recording 11.97 in Yaoundé. No wind assistance information was supplied.
