= Mariama Mamoudou Ittatou =

Nigerien sprinter (born 1997)

Mariama Mamoudou Ittatou (born July 23, 1997) is a Nigerien sprinter. She competed at the 2016 Summer Olympics in the women's 400 metres event; her time of 54.32 seconds in the heats did not qualify her for the semifinals.

She was also scheduled to represent Niger at the 2014 Summer Youth Olympics but she did not start at the girls' 800 metres event.

She competed at the women's 400 metres event at the 2016 African Championships in Athletics. She also competed in the women's 200 metres event at the 2018 African Championships in Athletics as well as the women's 400 metres event. At the 2019 African Games she competed in the women's 400 metres event but did not qualify for the finals.
