= Christine Botlogetswe =

Botswana sprinter

Personal information
- Born: 1 October 1995 (age 30) Rakops, Botswana
- Height: 1.62 m (5 ft 4 in)
- Weight: 67 kg (148 lb)

Sport
- Sport: Athletics
- Event(s): 200 m, 400 m
- Coached by: Justice Dipeba
Medal record
Women's athletics
Representing Botswana
African Games
Silver medal – second place	2015 Brazzaville	4x400 m
African Championships
Silver medal – second place	2018 Asaba	400 m
Bronze medal – third place	2014 Marrakesh	4×400 m

Christine Ayanda Botlogetswe (born 1 October 1995) is a Botswana sprinter who competes primarily in the 400 metres. She competed at the 2016 Olympics, running a non-qualifying 52.37 in the first round. She runs for the Orapa Athletics Club and is coached by Justice Dipeba, who also coaches Isaac Makwala, the seventh fastest man in history.

She qualified to represent Botswana at the 2020 Summer Olympics.

== International competitions ==
Year	Competition	Venue	Position	Event	Notes
Representing Botswana
2011	African Junior Championships	Gaborone, Botswana	8th	400 m	55.87
2011	African Junior Championships	Gaborone, Botswana	4th	4 × 400 m relay	3:48.71
2011	World Youth Championships	Lille, France	41st (h)	400 m	59.13
2012	World Junior Championships	Barcelona, Spain	30th (h)	400 m	55.26
2013	African Junior Championships	Bambous, Mauritius	6th	400 m	56.72
2014	African Championships	Marrakesh, Morocco	29th (h)	200 m	25.75
2014	African Championships	Marrakesh, Morocco	3rd	4 × 400 m relay	3:40.28
2015	IAAF World Relays	Nassau, Bahamas	5th (B)	4 × 400 m relay	3:35.76
2015	African Games	Brazzaville, Republic of the Congo	15th (sf)	400 m	54.32
2015	African Games	Brazzaville, Republic of the Congo	2nd	4 × 400 m relay	3:32.84
2016	African Championships	Durban, South Africa	6th	400 m	53.31
2016	African Championships	Durban, South Africa	4th	4 × 400 m relay	3:31.54
2016	Olympic Games	Rio de Janeiro, Brazil	30th (h)	400 m	52.37
2017	IAAF World Relays	Nassau, Bahamas	6th	4 × 400 m relay	3:30.13
2017	World Championships	London, United Kingdom	43rd (h)	400 m	53.50
2017	World Championships	London, United Kingdom	7th	4 × 400 m relay	3:28.00
2018	Commonwealth Games	Gold Coast, Australia	4th	400 m	51.17
2018	Commonwealth Games	Gold Coast, Australia	3rd	4 × 400 m relay	3:26.86
2018	African Championships	Asaba, Nigeria	2nd	400 m	51.19
2019	World Championships	Doha, Qatar	42nd (h)	400 m	53.27
2021	Olympic Games	Tokyo, Japan	38th (h)	400 m	53.99
2022	African Championships	Port Louis, Mauritius	10th (sf)	400 m	55.06
2022	African Championships	Port Louis, Mauritius	4th	4 × 400 m relay	3:36.96

== Personal bests ==
Outdoor

- 200 metres – 25.75 (+0.2 m/s, Marrakesh 2014)
- 400 metres – 51.17 (Gold Coast 2018)
