= Leni Shida =

Ugandan sprinter (born 1994)

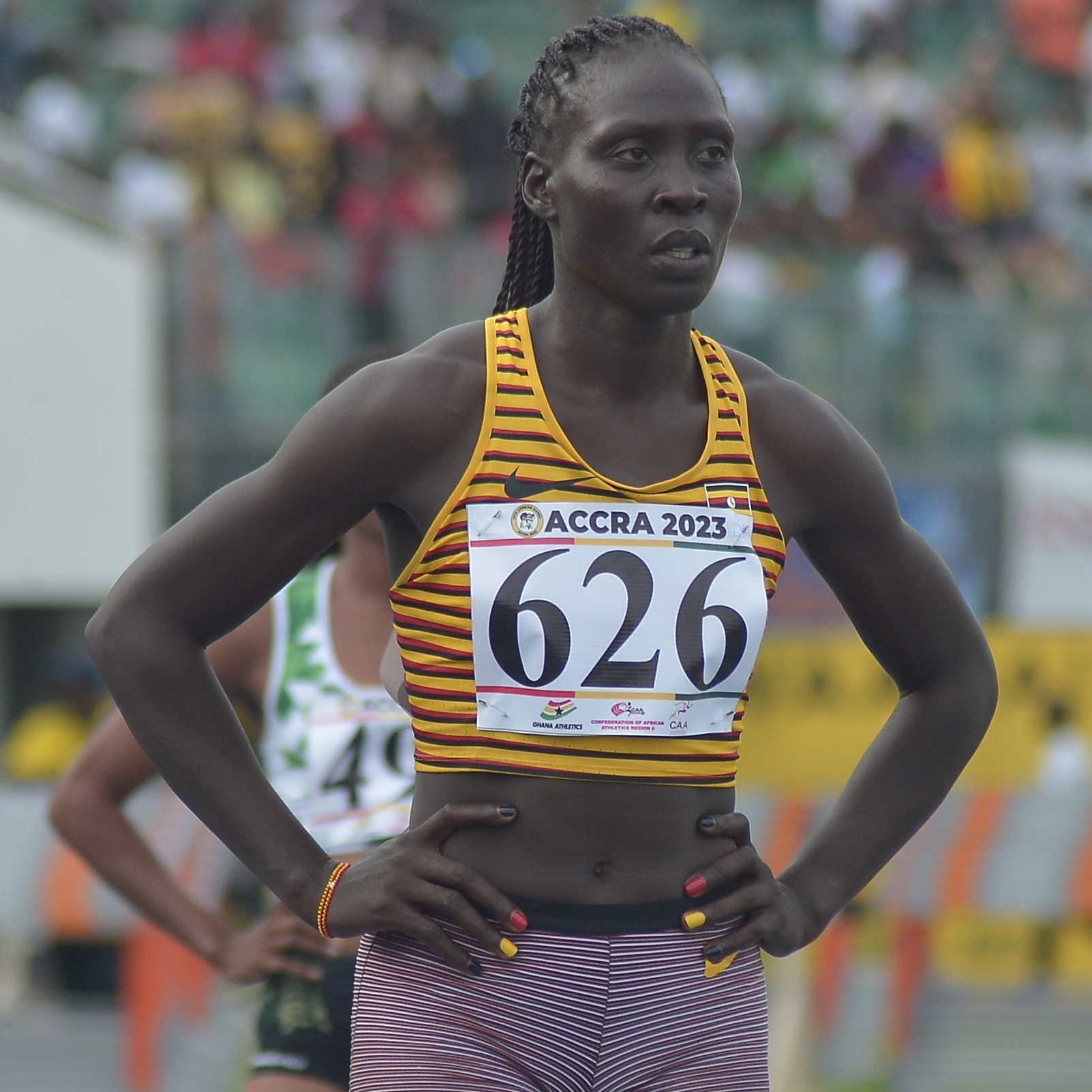
- Shida at the 2023 African Games

Personal information
- Born: 22 May 1994 (age 32) Arua, Uganda
- Education: Bugema University
- Height: 1.73 m (5 ft 8 in)
- Weight: 56 kg (123 lb)

Sport
- Sport: Athletics
- Events: 200 m, 400 m
- Coached by: Kevin and Sue O'Connor
Medal record
Women's athletics
Representing Uganda
Islamic Solidarity Games
Bronze medal – third place	2025 Riyadh	400 m

Shida Leni (born 22 May 1994) is an Ugandan sprinter.

== Early life ==
Shida was born in Arua in 1994 as the daughter of Abdulatif Tiyua, a retired military officer and former deputy commander the West Nile Bank Front rebel group.

== Career ==
After Kevin and Sue O'Connor began coaching Shida in August 2013, she represented Uganda at the 2014 Commonwealth Games in Glasgow reaching the semifinals. This was her first competition outside of Uganda. In February 2018, in Kampala, she ran 52.47 to break the 12-year-old 400m National Record. She has now broken this record on 7 occasions, most recently at the 2019 National Championships (51.47), where she also broke the 12-year-old 200m National Record with a time of 23.43. Shida's most notable international achievement was 400m Silver Medal (51.64) at the 2019 World University Games held in Naples, Italy.

She competed at the 2020 Summer Olympics.

== International competitions ==
Year	Competition	Venue	Position	Event	Notes
Representing Uganda
2014	Commonwealth Games	Glasgow, United Kingdom	21st (sf)	400 m	54.30
2015	Universiade	Gwangju, South Korea	11th (sf)	400 m	53.40
2015	Universiade	Gwangju, South Korea	5th	4 × 400 m relay	3:45.40
2015	African Games	Brazzaville, Republic of the Congo	19th (sf)	200 m	24.56
2015	African Games	Brazzaville, Republic of the Congo	6th	400 m	52.86
2016	African Championships	Durban, South Africa	8th	400 m	53.91
2017	Islamic Solidarity Games	Baku, Azerbaijan	5th	400 m	54.57
2017	Universiade	Taipei, Taiwan	34th (h)	200 m	25.29
2017	Universiade	Taipei, Taiwan	11th (sf)	400 m	53.44
2017	Universiade	Taipei, Taiwan	15th (h)	4 × 100 m relay	47.05
2017	Universiade	Taipei, Taiwan	6th	4 × 400 m relay	3:43.38
2018	Commonwealth Games	Gold Coast, Australia	22nd (sf)	400 m	54.50
2018	Commonwealth Games	Gold Coast, Australia	8th	4 × 400 m relay	3:35.03
2018	African Championships	Asaba, Nigeria	10th (sf)	200 m	24.36
2018	African Championships	Asaba, Nigeria	6th	400 m	52.78
2019	World Relays	Yokohama, Japan	19th (h)	4 × 400 m relay	3:35.02
2019	Universiade	Naples, Italy	2nd	400 m	51.64
2019	African Games	Rabat, Morocco	6th	400 m	52.47
2019	African Games	Rabat, Morocco	3rd	4 × 400 m relay	3:32.25
2019	World Championships	Doha, Qatar	31st (h)	400 m	52.22
2021	Olympic Games	Tokyo, Japan	31st (h)	400 m	52.48
2022	African Championships	Port Louis, Mauritius	4th	400 m	52.91
2024	African Games	Accra, Ghana	11th (sf)	400 m	53.23
2024	African Championships	Douala, Cameroon	7th	400 m	53.50
2025	World Championships	Tokyo, Japan	27th (h)	400 m	51.61
2025	Islamic Solidarity Games	Riyadh, Saudi Arabia	3rd	400 m	52.72
2026	Commonwealth Games	Glasgow, United Kingdom	22nd (sf)	400 m	55.85

== Personal bests ==
Outdoor

- 200 metres – 23.43 (Kampala 2019) (National Record)
- 400 metres – 51.47 (Kampala 2019) (National Record)
- 800 metres – 2:13.20 (Gavardo 2017)
