= Kabange Mupopo =

Zambian sprinter and footballer (born 1992)

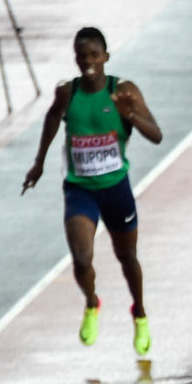
- Mupopo in 2017

Personal information
- Full name: Kabange Mupopo
- Date of birth: 21 September 1992 (age 34)
- Place of birth: Lusaka, Zambia
- Height: 1.70 m (5 ft 7 in)
- Position: Midfielder

Team information
- Current team: Green Buffaloes

Senior career*
Years	Team	Apps	(Gls)
- Green Buffaloes

International career
2012–	Zambia		
- * Club domestic league appearances and goals

Kabange Mupopo
Medal record

athletics

Representing Zambia

All-Africa Games
Gold medal – first place	2015 Brazzaville	400 m

African Championships
Gold medal – first place	2016 Durban	400 m
Silver medal – second place	2014 Marrakesh	400 m

Kabange Mupopo (born 21 September 1992) is a Zambian sprinter and women's professional footballer who plays as a midfielder. She won gold in the 400 metres at the 2015 All-Africa Games and represented Zambia in football at the 2024 Summer Olympics.

== Biography ==
Mupopo started playing football at 11 with her brother's guidance. She played for Green Buffaloes F.C. and the Zambia women's national football team; as team captain, she led Zambia to the 2014 African Women's Championship tournament, where they were eliminated in the group stage.

Mupopo picked up athletics in the spring of 2014, running 53.44 for 400 metres in her first official meeting. She represented Zambia at the 2014 Commonwealth Games in Glasgow, where she ran 53.09 and was eliminated in the semi-finals. In August, she took silver in 51.21 at the African Championships in Marrakesh, breaking the Zambian record; she lost the gold to Nigeria's Folashade Abugan, who ran the same time, in a photo-finish. Mupopo qualified to represent Africa at the 2014 IAAF Continental Cup, also in Marrakesh, where she placed fourth and improved her national record to 50.87. Mupopo received an 18-month athletics scholarship from the Zambian Olympic Committee in 2015, leading her to concentrate on athletics and not football.

Mupopo debuted in the IAAF Diamond League in Doha in May 2015, placing seventh in 51.88. In July 2015 she ran 50.86 in La Chaux-de-Fonds, improving her national record by one-hundredth of a second. She was selected for the 2015 World Championships in Beijing.

On 3 July 2024, Mupopo was called up to the Zambia squad for the 2024 Summer Olympics.
