= Sonia Baishya =

Indian athlete

Sonia Baishya (born 31 December 1995) is an Indian athlete from West Bengal. She competes in 400m event. She was selected for the Indian team in the 4x400 mixed relay event for the 2022 Asian Games at Hangzhou, China.

== Early life ==
She hails from Raiganj district of West Bengal.

== Career ==
- 2023: She won the gold in the Sri Lanka Athletics National Championships in Sugathadasa Stadium, Colombo in July 2023.
- 2019: In May, she represented India in the 4 × 400 m World Relay Championships at Yokohama, Japan.
