= Olesea Cojuhari =

Moldovan sprinter

Personal information
- Born: March 29, 1990 (age 36)
- Height: 1.70 m (5 ft 7 in)
- Weight: 58 kg (128 lb)

Sport
- Country: Moldova
- Sport: Athletics
- Event: 400m

Olesea Cojuhari (born 29 March 1990 in Chişinău) is a Moldovan sprinter who specializes in the 400 metres. She represented Moldova at the 2012 Summer Olympics.
