= Margaret Wambui =

Kenyan middle-distance runner

Margaret Nyairera Wambui
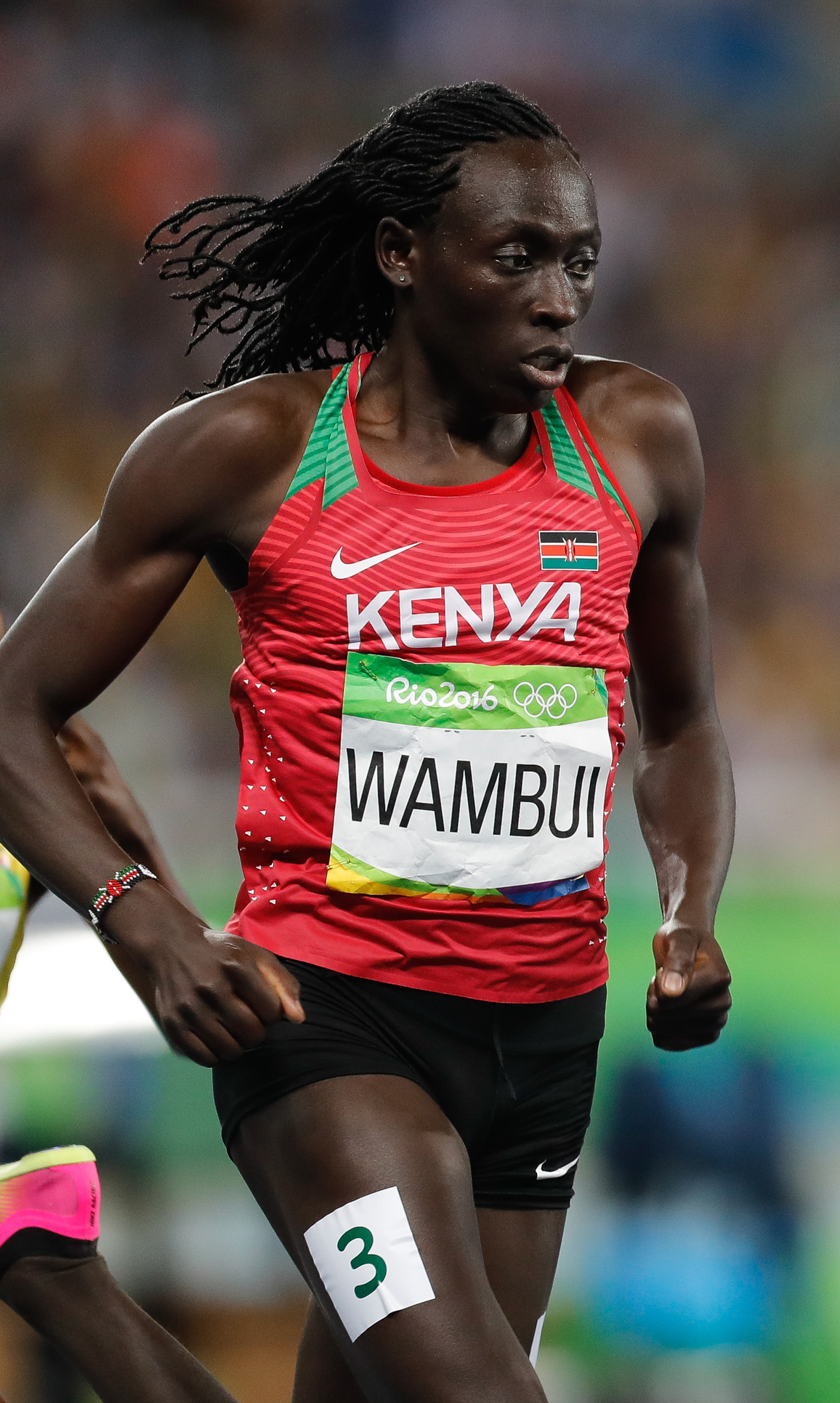
- Wambui at the 2016 Olympics

Personal information
- Born: 15 September 1995 (age 30) Nyeri, Kenya
- Height: 1.85 m (6 ft 1 in)
- Weight: 70 kg (154 lb)

Sport
- Sport: Track and field
- Event: 800 metres

Achievements and titles
- Personal bests: 1:56.89 (outdoors, 2016); 2:00.44 (indoors, 2016)
Medal record
Women's athletics
Representing Kenya
Olympic Games
| Bronze medal – third place | 2016 Rio de Janeiro | 800 m |
World Indoor Championships
| Bronze medal – third place | 2016 Portland | 800 m |
African Championships
| Silver medal – second place | 2016 Durban | 400 m |
| Bronze medal – third place | 2016 Durban | 4×400 m |

Margaret Nyairera Wambūi (born 15 September 1995) is a Kenyan middle-distance runner who specialized in the 800 metres.

In her first international competition, she won the gold at the 2014 World Junior Championships. She later competed at the 2015 World Championships without advancing from her heat. At the 2016 World Indoor Championships she won the bronze medal. That same year she competed at the 2016 Summer Olympics, setting a new personal best of 1:56.89 in the final, which also earned her a bronze.

In 2019, it was revealed that Wambūi was born with the 46,XY karyotype and an intersex condition after she was disqualified from IAAF women's competition by the association's new regulations for athletes with XY disorders of sex development, testosterone levels above 5 nmol/L, and androgen sensitivity. The rules were upheld by the Court of Arbitration for Sport. Wambūi declined to take medication to suppress her testostoerone levels in order to be eligible for women's competitions under the new rules, and has not competed internationally since then.

She was one of the athletes whose cases were profiled in Phyllis Ellis's 2022 documentary film Category: Woman.

== Competition record ==
| Year | Competition | Venue | Position | Event | Notes |
Representing Kenya
| 2014 | World Junior Championships | Eugene, United States | 1st | 800 m | 2:00.49 |
| 2015 | World Championships | Beijing, China | 39th (h) | 800 m | 2:03.52 |
| 2016 | World Indoor Championships | Portland, United States | 3rd | 800 m | 2:00.44 |
| 2016 | African Championships | Durban, South Africa | 2nd | 400 m | 52.24 |
| 2016 | African Championships | Durban, South Africa | 3rd | 4 × 400 m relay | 3:30.21 |
| 2016 | Olympic Games | Rio de Janeiro, Brazil | 3rd | 800 m | 1:56.89 |
| 2017 | World Championships | London, United Kingdom | 4th | 800 m | 1:57.54 |
| 2018 | World Indoor Championships | Birmingham, United Kingdom | – | 800 m | DQ |
| 2018 | Commonwealth Games | Gold Coast, Australia | 2nd | 800 m | 1:58.07 |
| 2018 | African Championships | Asaba, Nigeria | 7th (h) | 800 m | 2:02.80^{1} |

^{1}Did not finish in the final
