= Goitseone Seleka =

Botswana sprinter

Personal information
- Nationality: Botswana
- Born: 10 August 1988 (age 37)

Sport
- Sport: Athletics
- Event: 400 m
Medal record
Women's athletics
Representing Botswana
African Games
Silver medal – second place	2015 Brazzaville	4x400 m
African Championships
Silver medal – second place	2012 Porto-Novo	4×400 m
Bronze medal – third place	2014 Marrakesh	4×400 m
- Updated on 26 August 2016

Goitseone Seleka (born 10 August 1988) is a Botswana athlete competing primarily in the 400 metres. She participated in the 4 × 400 metres relay at the 2013 World Championships without qualifying for the final. Goitseone is born and bred in a village called Nkange.

Her personal best in the event is 53.11 seconds set in Porto-Novo in 2012.

== Competition record ==
Year	Competition	Venue	Position	Event	Notes
Representing Botswana
2010	African Championships	Nairobi, Kenya	14th (h)	800 m	2:31.74
2011	All-Africa Games	Maputo, Mozambique	13th (sf)	400 m	55.58
2012	African Championships	Porto-Novo, Benin	13th (sf)	400 m	54.09
2012	African Championships	Porto-Novo, Benin	2nd	4 × 400 m relay	3:31.27
2013	World Championships	Moscow, Russia	16th (h)	4 × 400 m relay	3:38.96
2014	African Championships	Marrakesh, Morocco	17th (h)	400 m	55.67
2014	African Championships	Marrakesh, Morocco	3rd	4 × 400 m relay	3:40.28
2015	IAAF World Relays	Nassau, Bahamas	13th	4 × 400 m relay	3:35.76
2015	African Games	Brazzaville, Republic of the Congo	14th (sf)	400 m	53.23
2015	African Games	Brazzaville, Republic of the Congo	2nd	4 × 400 m relay	3:32.84
2016	African Championships	Durban, South Africa	15th (sf)	400 m	54.41
2018	African Championships	Asaba, Nigeria	23rd (h)	400 m	56.17
2018	African Championships	Asaba, Nigeria	4th	4 × 400 m relay	3:42.16
