= Nadezhda Kotlyarova =

Russian sprinter

Personal information
- Born: 12 June 1989 (age 37)

Sport
- Country: Russia
- Sport: Track and field
- Event: 400 metres

Nadezhda Kotlyarova (born 12 June 1989) is a Russian sprinter. She competed in the 400 metres event at the 2015 World Championships in Athletics in Beijing, China. In 2016, she tested positive for meldonium.
