= Regina George (sprinter) =

American-Nigerian sprinter (born 1991)

Personal information
- Citizenship: Nigerian and American
- Born: 17 February 1991 (age 35) Chicago, Illinois, United States

Sport
- Country: Nigeria
- Sport: Athletics
- Events: 400 metres 4 × 400 metres relay

Achievements and titles
- Personal bests: 400 m 50.84; 200 m 23.22; Indoor; 400 m 51.05; 200 m 23.00
Medal record
Women's athletics
Representing Nigeria
African Championships
Silver medal – second place	2012 Porto-Novo	400 m
Gold medal – first place	2014 Marrakesh	4×400 m
Silver medal – second place	2016 Durban	4×400 m
Commonwealth Games
Silver medal – second place	2014 Glasgow	4×400 m
World Relays
Gold medal – first place	2015 Nassau	4×200 m
Bronze medal – third place	2014 Nassau	4×400 m
Representing United States
World Junior Championships
Gold medal – first place	2010 Moncton	4×400 m

Regina George Grause (born 17 February 1991) is an American-born Nigerian sprinter who specializes in the 400 metres. She represented Nigeria at the 2012 Summer Olympics and was the silver medallist at the African Championships in 2012.

== Personal ==
Her father Phillips is Nigerian, and moved to the US on an athletic scholarship. Her paternal grandfather was from Onitsha while her grandmother is from Rivers State, Nigeria. Her mother is a former Venezuelan 400 m athlete, Florencia Chilberry. George's parents were both scholarship track and field athletes at Wichita State University. George competed in Chicago Park District meets as a child and ran a mile in 6:13 when she was nine years old. She has one older sibling and three younger siblings.

In 2014, she and Inika McPherson announced on social media that they are in a relationship.

== Career ==
As a junior athlete, George represented the United States at the 2010 World Junior Championships. She placed seventh in the 400 m final. She later anchored the United States 4 × 400 m team to a gold medal ahead of the Nigerian team which placed second. At this championship meet, George expressed her desire to run for Nigeria (whose team finished a half second behind her for the silver medal) to the Nigerian coach, Gabriel Okon. She began to compete for Nigeria in 2012, ahead of the African Championships and London Olympics.

As a collegiate athlete for the University of Arkansas, George won six 4 × 400 m SEC titles, three indoor and three outdoor titles. She was also the SEC individual 400 m champion in 2012 and 2013. She anchored the Razorbacks to the NCAA 4 × 400 m outdoor title in 2013. She placed second behind Shaunae Miller in the 400 m final at the 2013 NCAA Division I Indoor championships in an indoor PB of 51.05s. This was her third time placing second at the indoor championships. She later helped the Razorback 4 × 400 m team to a second-place finish in the final. As at 2015, George remains tied with Ryan Tolbert as the highest scoring 400 m athlete who never won an NCAA indoor title.

George became the 2012 Nigerian champion and went on to win a silver medal in the individual 400 m event behind reigning world champion Amantle Montsho, at the 2012 African Championships. At the 2012 London Olympics, George won her 400 m heat in 51.24s but could only manage a fifth-place finish in her semifinal and missed out in the final. She returned for the 4 × 400 m heats and later ran the third leg for the Nigerian team in the final. The team who initially finished in seventh place were disqualified for a lane infringement during the change over between Odumosu and George.

=== 2013 ===
In 2013, George dipped under 51 s for the first time at the Nigeria Athletics Championships in Calabar. She ran 50.99 to claim the national title ahead of Patience George. This set the scene for the rest of her season. At the Moscow World Championships, she produced a personal best of 50.84 to place third in her semifinal but still missed out on a final spot. She returned for the relays and produced a sub 50 split to get Nigeria an automatic qualifying spot for the 4 × 400 m final. The team later placed sixth in the final with George running another sub 50 split. At the 2013 Penn relays, she had also run the fastest split of the entire meet.

=== 2014 ===
In January 2014, George ran the 600 m in an African indoor record time of 1:25.76. This time took George to the ninth spot on the world indoor all-time list. As the fastest in qualifying, she was one of the favourites for the 2014 IAAF World Indoor Championships, but withdrew from the semi-final due to leg cramps. At the 2014 maiden edition of the IAAF World Relays in Nassau, Bahamas, she ran the fastest split during the final of the 4 × 400 m relay. The Nigerian team consisting of Sade Abugan, Regina George, Omolara Omotoso and Patience George finished in third place behind the US and Jamaica. At the 2014 Nigerian Track and Field Championships in Calabar, she was favoured to defend the National title which she had won the two previous years. She ran the fastest qualifying time in the semifinals. Surprisingly, she placed fourth in the final behind her teammates from the 2014 world relay quartet. Former world junior champion, Sade Abugan claimed the National title. Abugan would later become the African champion in 2014. George ran during the heats and finals of the 4 × 400 m at the Glasgow Commonwealth Games. The team consisting of Patience George, Regina George, Ada Benjamin and Sade Abugan, won the silver medal behind the Jamaican team. This same team went on to win the gold medal at the African Championships in Marrakesh where George also placed sixth in the 200 m final.

=== 2015 ===
At the 2015 IAAF World Relays in Nassau, George ran the second leg of the 4 × 200 m relay team that won the gold medal ahead of the Jamaican and German teams. The team consisting of Blessing Okagbare, George, Dominique Duncan and Christy Udoh won the race in 1:30.52 and eclipsed the previous African record in the event. She placed second at the Nigerian Championships behind Patience George and thereby sealed her spot for the 2015 World Championships in Beijing. She missed out on a fastest loser spot in the 400 m heats in Beijing and did not make it to the semifinals. She also led off the Nigerian 4 × 400 m relay team that finished in fifth place in the 4 × 400 m final.

=== 2016 ===
George was part of the Nigerian 4 × 400 m team that finished second in the African Championships in Durban.
