= Tosin Adeloye =

Nigerian sprinter

Personal information
- Born: 7 February 1996 (age 30)

Sport
- Country: Nigeria
- Sport: Track and field
- Event: 400 metres
Medal record
Women's Athletics
Representing Nigeria
African Games
Disqualified	2015 Brazzaville	4x400 m relay

Tosin Adeloye (born 7 February 1996) is a Nigerian sprinter. She competed in the 400 metres event at the 2015 World Championships in Athletics in Beijing, China.

== Doping ban ==
Adeloye tested positive for the anabolic steroid Metenolone at the National Sports Festival in Lagos in December 2012, at the age of 16, and was subsequently banned from sports for two years. The ban ended 6 January 2015.

She received a second ban for eight years after another failed test in 2016.
