= Hellen Syombua =

Kenyan sprinter

Personal information
- Nationality: Kenyan
- Born: 8 August 1997 (age 28)

Sport
- Sport: Athletics
- Event: Sprinting
Medal record
Women's athletics
Representing Kenya
African Championships
Silver medal – second place	2018 Asaba	4×400 m

Hellen Syombua (born 8 August 1997) is a Kenyan athlete. She competed in the women's 400 metres event at the 2019 World Athletics Championships. She did not advance to compete in the semi-finals.

In June 2021, she qualified to represent Kenya at the 2020 Summer Olympics.
