= Akua Obeng-Akrofi =

Ghanaian sprinter

Personal information
- Nationality: Ghanaian
- Born: 10 July 1996 (age 29)

Sport
- Sport: Sprinting
- Event: 4 × 100 metres

Akua Obeng-Akrofi (born 10 July 1996) is a Ghanaian sprinter. In 2016, Obeng-Akrofi represented Ghana at the Rio Olympics as part of the country's relay team.

Obeng-Akrofi was born in Ghana and raised in Lawrenceville, Georgia. She attended Archer High School in Lawrenceville, Georgia.

She competed in the women's 4 × 100 metres relay at the 2017 World Championships in Athletics. In 2018 she represented Ghana again at the Commonwealth Games.

She graduated from Columbia University in 2018 and was recognized with a Campbell Award for "exceptional leadership and Columbia spirit".
