= Kore Tola =

Ethiopian middle-distance runner

Personal information
- Full name: Kore Tola Nagaho
- Nationality: Ethiopian
- Born: 16 January 1997 (age 28)

Sport
- Sport: Middle-distance running
- Event: 800 metres

Kore Tola Nagaho (born 16 January 1997) is an Ethiopian middle-distance runner. She competed in the women's 800 metres at the 2017 World Championships in Athletics.
