= Folashade Abugan =

Nigerian sprinter (born 1990)

Personal information
- Full name: Folashade Abigeal Abugan
- Nationality: Nigeria
- Born: 17 December 1990 (age 35)

Sport
- Sport: Athletics
- Event: 400 m
Medal record
Women's athletics
Representing Nigeria
Commonwealth Games
Silver medal – second place	2006 Melbourne	4x400 m
Silver medal – second place	2014 Glasgow	4x400 m
African Games
Gold medal – first place	2007 Algiers	4x400 m
Bronze medal – third place	2007 Algiers	400 m
African Championships
Gold medal – first place	2008 Addis Ababa	4×400 m
Gold medal – first place	2010 Nairobi	4×400 m
Gold medal – first place	2014 Marrakesh	400 m
Gold medal – first place	2014 Marrakesh	4×400 m
Gold medal – first place	2018 Asaba	4×400 m
Silver medal – second place	2008 Addis Ababa	400 m
Bronze medal – third place	2010 Nairobi	400 m
- Updated on 27 August 2016

Folashade Abigeal Abugan (born 17 December 1990) is a Nigerian sprinter who specializes in the 400 metres. She was the 400 m bronze medalist at the 2007 All-Africa Games and improved to the silver medal at the 2008 African Championships, where she set a personal best time of 50.89 seconds. She won gold medals at the 2008 World Junior Championships in Athletics and the 2009 African Junior Athletics Championships.

She appeared at the 2010 Commonwealth Games in Delhi and won two silver medals for Nigeria in the 400 m and in 4x400 m relay. However, Abugan was disqualified and banned after failing a drugs test and testing positive for testosterone prohormone in her 'A' sample. She waived the right to have her B sample analysed.

== Achievements ==
Year	Competition	Venue	Position	Event	Notes
Representing Nigeria
2006	Commonwealth Games	Melbourne, Australia	2nd	4 × 400 m relay	3:31.83
2006	World Junior Championships	Beijing, China	8th	400 m	52.87
2006	World Junior Championships	Beijing, China	2nd	4 × 400 m relay	3:30.84 AJR
2007	All-Africa Games	Algiers, Algeria	3rd	400 m	51.44 PB
2007	All-Africa Games	Algiers, Algeria	1st	4 × 400 m relay	3:29.74
2008	African Championships	Addis Ababa, Ethiopia	2nd	400 m	50.89 PB
2008	African Championships	Addis Ababa, Ethiopia	1st	4 × 400 m relay	3:30.07
2008	World Junior Championships	Bydgoszcz, Poland	1st	400 m	51.84
2009	African Junior Athletics Championships	Bambous, Mauritius	1st	400 m	52.02 CR
2009	African Junior Athletics Championships	Bambous, Mauritius	DQ	4 × 400 m	
2010	Commonwealth Games	New Delhi, India	DQ	400 m	
2010	Commonwealth Games	New Delhi, India	DQ	4 × 400 m	
