= Galefele Moroko =

Botswana sprinter (born 1997)

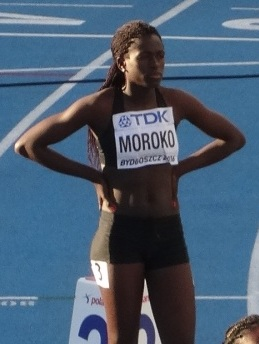
- Galefele Moroko in 2016

Personal information
- Nationality: Botswana
- Born: 16 April 1997 (age 29)

Sport
- Sport: Sprinting
- Event: 4 × 400 metres
Medal record
Men's athletics
Representing Botswana
African Championships
Bronze medal – third place	2024 Douala	Mixed 4×400 m relay

Galefele Moroko (born 16 April 1997) is a Botswana sprinter. She competed in the women's 4 × 400 metres relay at the 2017 World Championships in Athletics. She qualified to represent Botswana at the 2020 Summer Olympics.
