= Athletics at the 2015 African Games – Women's 100 metres =

The women's 100 metres event at the 2015 African Games was held on 13 and 14 September.

== Medalists ==
Gold	Silver	Bronze
Marie-Josée Ta Lou; Ivory Coast	Eunice Kadogo; Kenya	Pon Karidjatou Traoré; Burkina Faso; Adeline Gouenon; Ivory Coast

== Results ==
=== Heats ===
Qualification: First 4 in each heat (Q) and the next 8 fastest (q) advanced to the semifinals.

Wind:
Heat 1: +0.8 m/s, Heat 2: +0.2 m/s, Heat 3: -1.0 m/s, Heat 4: +1.8 m/s

Rank	Heat	Name	Nationality	Time	Notes
1	4	Marie-Josée Ta Lou	Ivory Coast	11.16	Q
2	4	Beatrice Gyaman	Ghana	11.65	Q, SB
3	4	Cecilia Francis	Nigeria	11.70	Q
4	1	Tsaone Sebele	Botswana	11.73	Q
5	1	Adeline Gouenon	Ivory Coast	11.74	Q
6	3	Pon Karidjatou Traoré	Burkina Faso	11.75	Q
7	2	Flings Owusu-Agyapong	Ghana	11.78	Q
8	3	Eunice Kadogo	Kenya	11.79	Q
9	2	Marie Gisele Eleme Asse	Cameroon	11.82	Q
10	2	Gina Bass	Gambia	11.87	Q, NR
11	2	Globine Mayova	Namibia	11.89	Q
12	1	Marceline Bouele Bondo	Republic of the Congo	11.90	Q
13	4	Milicent Ndoro	Kenya	11.95	Q
14	3	Elodie Embony	Madagascar	11.96	Q
15	3	Gemma Acheampong	Ghana	12.01	Q
16	2	Adjona Triphene Kouame	Ivory Coast	12.06	q
17	3	Germaine Abessolo Bivina	Cameroon	12.09	q
18	1	Frasha Wangari	Kenya	12.12	Q
18	4	Yvonne Nalishuwa	Zambia	12.12	q
20	1	Mildred Gamba	Uganda	12.16	q
20	3	Audrey Eyamba	Republic of the Congo	12.16	q
22	4	Marie Jaine Eba	Cameroon	12.17	q
23	4	Joanne Loutoy	Seychelles	12.34	q
24	3	Amelie Anthony	Mauritius	12.37	q
25	2	Mariama Koroma	Sierra Leone	12.38	
26	3	Prenam Pesse	Togo	12.45	
27	1	Lidiane Lopes	Cape Verde	12.55	SB
28	4	Gorete Semedo	São Tomé and Príncipe	12.62	
28	3	Abissie Kebede	Ethiopia	12.62	
30	4	Esther Sheriff	Sierra Leone	12.78	
31	1	Makoura Keita	Guinea	12.80	
32	2	Limakatso Selala	Lesotho	13.06	
33	4	Eva Cosmos Elia Endili	South Sudan	13.21	
34	1	Yvonne Tama Douva	Central African Republic	13.64	
	2	Lumeka Katundu	Zambia	DQ	
	2	Elizza Tenga Tenga	Malawi	DNS	
	2	Suzan Loui Saleh Bamanga	South Sudan	DNS	

=== Semifinals ===
Qualification: First 2 in each semifinal (Q) and the next 2 fastest (q) advanced to the final.

Wind:
Heat 1: 0.0 m/s, Heat 2: 0.0 m/s, Heat 3: +0.2 m/s

Rank	Heat	Name	Nationality	Time	Notes
1	2	Marie-Josée Ta Lou	Ivory Coast	11.07	Q
2	3	Adeline Gouenon	Ivory Coast	11.51	Q, SB
3	1	Pon Karidjatou Traoré	Burkina Faso	11.58	Q
3	2	Eunice Kadogo	Kenya	11.58	Q, NR
5	1	Cecilia Francis	Nigeria	11.60	Q
6	1	Flings Owusu-Agyapong	Ghana	11.69	q
7	2	Beatrice Gyaman	Ghana	11.70	q
8	3	Tsaone Sebele	Botswana	11.71	Q
9	3	Marie Gisele Eleme Asse	Cameroon	11.77	
10	3	Gemma Acheampong	Ghana	11.81	
11	3	Marceline Bouele Bondo	Republic of the Congo	11.86	
12	2	Elodie Embony	Madagascar	11.94	
13	1	Gina Bass	Gambia	11.97	
14	1	Milicent Ndoro	Kenya	11.98	
15	3	Frasha Wangari	Kenya	12.02	
16	2	Germaine Abessolo Bivina	Cameroon	12.03	
17	2	Yvonne Nalishuwa	Zambia	12.12	
18	1	Audrey Eyamba	Republic of the Congo	12.20	
19	1	Adjona Triphene Kouame	Ivory Coast	12.22	
20	3	Mildred Gamba	Uganda	12.25	
21	1	Marie Jaine Eba	Cameroon	12.30	
22	2	Amelie Anthony	Mauritius	12.41	
23	3	Joanne Loutoy	Seychelles	12.44	
	2	Globine Mayova	Namibia	DNS	

=== Final ===
Wind: +0.6 m/s

Rank	Lane	Name	Nationality	Time	Notes
1st place, gold medalist(s)	7	Marie-Josée Ta Lou	Ivory Coast	11.02	GR
2nd place, silver medalist(s)	4	Eunice Kadogo	Kenya	11.47	NR
3rd place, bronze medalist(s)	6	Pon Karidjatou Traoré	Burkina Faso	11.49	
3rd place, bronze medalist(s)	5	Adeline Gouenon	Ivory Coast	11.49	SB
5	8	Cecilia Francis	Nigeria	11.53	SB
6	2	Flings Owusu-Agyapong	Ghana	11.61	
7	3	Beatrice Gyaman	Ghana	11.76	
8	9	Tsaone Sebele	Botswana	11.82	
