= 2014 African Championships in Athletics – Women's 200 metres =

The women's 200 metres event at the 2014 African Championships in Athletics was held August 13–14 on Stade de Marrakech.

== Medalists ==
Gold	Silver	Bronze
Murielle Ahouré; Ivory Coast	Marie-Josée Ta Lou; Ivory Coast	Dominique Duncan; Nigeria

== Results ==
=== Heats ===
Qualification: First 4 of each heat (Q) and the next 4 fastest (q) qualified for the semifinals.

Wind: Heat 1: +0.2 m/s, Heat 2: +0.3 m/s, Heat 3: +0.2 m/s, Heat 4: +0.2 m/s, Heat 5: +0.8 m/s

Rank	Heat	Name	Nationality	Time	Notes
1	3	Murielle Ahouré	Ivory Coast	23.50	Q
2	3	Regina George	Nigeria	23.66	Q
3	1	Marie-Josée Ta Lou	Ivory Coast	23.75	Q
4	2	Lydia Mashila	Botswana	23.81	Q
5	2	Gloria Asumnu	Nigeria	23.86	Q
6	5	Justine Palframan	South Africa	23.94	Q
7	2	Melissa Hewitt	South Africa	23.95	Q
8	4	Dominique Duncan	Nigeria	23.99	Q
9	1	Tegest Tamangnu	Ethiopia	24.06	Q
10	2	Phumlile Ndzinisa	Swaziland	24.12	Q
11	2	Millicent Ndoro	Kenya	24.24	q
12	4	Natacha Ngoye Akamabi	Republic of the Congo	24.29	Q
13	5	Tryphene Kouame Adjoua	Ivory Coast	24.55	Q
14	2	Doreen Agyei	Ghana	24.59	q
15	5	Loungo Matlhaku	Botswana	24.65	Q
16	1	Djénébou Danté	Mali	24.75	Q
17	3	Aminata Diakite	Mali	24.84	Q
18	4	Safina Mukoswa	Kenya	24.90	Q
19	5	Labarang Charifa Benazir	Cameroon	24.91	Q
20	5	Assia Raziki	Morocco	24.94	q
21	1	Maureen Banura	Uganda	24.97	Q
22	5	Neima Sefa	Ethiopia	25.03	q
23	3	Valerie Hounkpeto	Benin	25.11	Q
24	3	Joanne Loutoy	Seychelles	25.34	
25	2	Germaine Abessolo Bivina	Cameroon	25.35	
26	1	Marie Jeanne Eba	Cameroon	25.35	
27	3	Abir Barkaoui	Tunisia	25.52	
28	2	Beatrice Midomide	Benin	25.65	
29	1	Christine Botlogetswe	Botswana	25.75	
30	1	Ghita El Kafy	Morocco	25.83	
31	3	Med Gebremariam	Ethiopia	25.91	
32	4	Anissa Emile	Seychelles	27.72	Q
	1	Felie Michele Mboyi	Republic of the Congo	DNS	
	4	Mberihonga Kanduvazu	Namibia	DNS	
	4	Tsaone Sebele	Botswana	DNS	
	4	Pon Karidjatou Traoré	Burkina Faso	DNS	
	5	Janet Amponsah	Ghana	DNS	

=== Semifinals ===
Qualification: First 2 of each semifinal (Q) and the next 2 fastest (q) qualified for the final.

Wind: Heat 1: -0.6 m/s, Heat 2: -1.4 m/s, Heat 3: +1.0 m/s

Rank	Heat	Name	Nationality	Time	Notes
1	3	Marie-Josée Ta Lou	Ivory Coast	23.02	Q
2	1	Gloria Asumnu	Nigeria	23.09	Q
3	2	Murielle Ahouré	Ivory Coast	23.39	Q
4	1	Justine Palframan	South Africa	23.43	Q
5	3	Dominique Duncan	Nigeria	23.44	Q
6	2	Regina George	Nigeria	23.60	Q
7	1	Phumlile Ndzinisa	Swaziland	23.79	q, NR
8	1	Lydia Mashila	Botswana	23.83	q
9	3	Melissa Hewitt	South Africa	23.89	
10	2	Natacha Ngoye Akamabi	Republic of the Congo	24.06	
11	3	Tegest Tamangnu	Ethiopia	24.19	
12	1	Tryphene Kouame Adjoua	Ivory Coast	24.33	
13	1	Doreen Agyei	Ghana	24.41	
14	3	Millicent Ndoro	Kenya	24.43	
15	2	Loungo Matlhaku	Botswana	24.70	
16	2	Valerie Hounkpeto	Benin	24.78	
17	3	Aminata Diakite	Mali	25.01	
18	3	Assia Raziki	Morocco	25.09	
19	2	Neima Sefa	Ethiopia	25.16	
20	3	Labarang Charifa Benazir	Cameroon	25.20	
	1	Safina Mukoswa	Kenya	DQ	R163.3a
	2	Maureen Banura	Uganda	DQ	R163.3a
	1	Anissa Emile	Seychelles	DNS	
	2	Djénébou Danté	Mali	DNS	

=== Final ===
Wind: -0.1 m/s

Rank	Lane	Name	Nationality	Time	Notes
1st place, gold medalist(s)	5	Murielle Ahouré	Ivory Coast	22.36	
2nd place, silver medalist(s)	4	Marie-Josée Ta Lou	Ivory Coast	22.87	
3rd place, bronze medalist(s)	8	Dominique Duncan	Nigeria	22.98	
4	6	Justine Palframan	South Africa	23.27	
5	3	Gloria Asumnu	Nigeria	23.31	
6	7	Regina George	Nigeria	23.53	
7	2	Lydia Mashila	Botswana	23.77	
8	1	Phumlile Ndzinisa	Swaziland	23.89	
