= Athletics at the 2015 African Games – Women's 200 metres =

The women's 200 metres event at the 2015 African Games was held on 16 and 17 September.

== Medalists ==
Gold	Silver	Bronze
Marie-Josée Ta Lou; Ivory Coast	Ngozi Onwumere; Nigeria	Lawretta Ozoh; Nigeria

== Results ==
=== Heats ===
Qualification: First 3 in each heat (Q) and the next 6 fastest (q) advanced to the semifinals.

Wind:
Heat 1: -0.1 m/s, Heat 2: -0.5 m/s, Heat 3: +0.5 m/s, Heat 4: +0.8 m/s, Heat 5: -0.8 m/s, Heat 6: +0.1 m/s

Rank	Heat	Name	Nationality	Time	Notes
1	6	Marie-Josée Ta Lou	Ivory Coast	23.07	Q
2	4	Ngozi Onwumere	Nigeria	23.43	Q
3	4	Natacha Ngoye Akamabi	Republic of the Congo	23.45	Q
4	4	Pon Karidjatou Traoré	Burkina Faso	23.69	Q, SB
5	1	Janet Amponsah	Ghana	23.72	Q
5	2	Phumlile Ndzinisa	Swaziland	23.72	Q, NR
7	6	Eunice Kadogo	Kenya	23.80	Q, SB
8	2	Tjipekapora Herunga	Namibia	23.85	Q, SB
8	3	Lawretta Ozoh	Nigeria	23.85	Q
8	6	Regina George	Nigeria	23.85	Q
11	5	Tsaone Sebele	Botswana	23.86	Q
12	2	Lumeka Katundu	Zambia	23.92	Q, SB
13	1	Marceline Bouele Bondo	Republic of the Congo	24.05	Q
13	6	Fatoumata Diop	Senegal	24.05	q
15	2	Adeline Gouenon	Ivory Coast	24.08	q
16	5	Milicent Ndoro	Kenya	24.17	Q
17	4	Elodie Embony	Madagascar	24.22	q
18	5	Gina Bass	Gambia	24.23	Q, NR
19	4	Marie Gisele Eleme Asse	Cameroon	24.28	q
20	4	Dorcas Gyimah	Ghana	24.34	q
21	3	Germaine Abessolo Bivina	Cameroon	24.44	Q
22	3	Adjona Triphene Kouame	Ivory Coast	24.51	Q
23	3	Leni Shida	Uganda	24.65	q
24	1	Tegest Tamagnu	Ethiopia	24.79	Q
25	1	Yvonne Nalishuwa	Zambia	24.90	
26	1	Marie Amelie Alcindor	Mauritius	24.98	
27	6	Abigail Sepiso	Zambia	25.01	
28	5	Marie Jaine Eba	Cameroon	25.13	
29	4	Lidiane Lopes	Cape Verde	25.53	
30	2	Joanne Loutoy	Seychelles	25.71	
31	2	Nema Sefa	Ethiopia	25.85	
31	6	Medihb Gebremariam	Ethiopia	25.85	
33	1	Prenam Pesse	Togo	25.88	
34	5	Makoura Keita	Guinea	26.09	SB
35	2	Marie Stephani Guillaume	Mauritius	26.30	
36	1	Fatou Mpangi	DR Congo	26.50	
37	3	Limakatso Selala	Lesotho	27.39	
38	3	Fatimata Doucouré	Mauritania	28.21	
	2	Hellen Syombua	Kenya	DNS	
	3	Maryam Nuh Muse	Somalia	DNS	
	3	Djénébou Danté	Mali	DNS	
	4	Mariama Koroma	Sierra Leone	DNS	
	5	Elizza Tenga Tenga	Malawi	DNS	
	5	Globine Mayova	Namibia	DNS	
	6	Marie Joamilla Janvier	Mauritius	DNS	

=== Semifinals ===
Qualification: First 2 in each semifinal (Q) and the next 2 fastest (q) advanced to the final.

Wind:
Heat 1: -0.2 m/s, Heat 2: -0.2 m/s, Heat 3: -0.7 m/s

Rank	Heat	Name	Nationality	Time	Notes
1	1	Marie-Josée Ta Lou	Ivory Coast	22.93	Q
2	1	Lawretta Ozoh	Nigeria	23.47	Q
2	3	Phumlile Ndzinisa	Swaziland	23.47	Q, NR
4	3	Janet Amponsah	Ghana	23.48	Q
5	2	Ngozi Onwumere	Nigeria	23.53	Q
6	1	Natacha Ngoye Akamabi	Republic of the Congo	23.58	q
7	2	Eunice Kadogo	Kenya	23.64	Q, SB
8	1	Pon Karidjatou Traoré	Burkina Faso	23.75	q
9	2	Tsaone Sebele	Botswana	23.79	
10	3	Tjipekapora Herunga	Namibia	23.81	SB
11	3	Marceline Bouele Bondo	Republic of the Congo	24.07	
12	1	Milicent Ndoro	Kenya	24.09	
13	3	Gina Bass	Gambia	24.13	NR
14	2	Lumeka Katundu	Zambia	24.14	
15	1	Fatoumata Diop	Senegal	24.18	
16	2	Elodie Embony	Madagascar	24.37	
16	3	Marie Gisele Eleme Asse	Cameroon	24.37	
18	2	Germaine Abessolo Bivina	Cameroon	24.40	
19	1	Leni Shida	Uganda	24.56	
20	2	Dorcas Gyimah	Ghana	24.60	
21	2	Adjona Triphene Kouame	Ivory Coast	24.71	
22	1	Tegest Tamagnu	Ethiopia	24.82	
	3	Adeline Gouenon	Ivory Coast	DNS	
	3	Regina George	Nigeria	DNS	

=== Final ===
Wind: -1.1 m/s

Rank	Lane	Name	Nationality	Time	Notes
1st place, gold medalist(s)	6	Marie-Josée Ta Lou	Ivory Coast	22.57	
2nd place, silver medalist(s)	7	Ngozi Onwumere	Nigeria	23.24	
3rd place, bronze medalist(s)	5	Lawretta Ozoh	Nigeria	23.37	
4	8	Janet Amponsah	Ghana	23.49	
5	2	Natacha Ngoye Akamabi	Republic of the Congo	23.61	
6	2	Phumlile Ndzinisa	Swaziland	23.69	
7	9	Eunice Kadogo	Kenya	23.83	
	3	Pon Karidjatou Traoré	Burkina Faso	DNS	
