= Athletics at the 2019 African Games – Women's 200 metres =

The women's 200 metres event at the 2019 African Games was held on 29 and 30 August in Rabat, Morocco.

== Medalists ==
Gold	Silver	Bronze
Gina Bass; Gambia	Basant Hemida; Egypt	Marie-Josée Ta Lou; Ivory Coast

== Results ==
=== Heats ===
Qualification: First 3 in each heat (Q) and the next 3 fastest (q) advanced to the semifinals.

Wind:
Heat 1: -0.1 m/s, Heat 2: +0.1 m/s, Heat 3: ? m/s, Heat 4: +0.4 m/s, Heat 5: +0.3 m/s, Heat 6: +0.1 m/s, Heat 7: -0.4 m/s

Rank	Heat	Name	Nationality	Time	Notes
1	6	Marie-Josée Ta Lou	Ivory Coast	22.96	Q
2	4	Gina Bass	Gambia	23.08	Q
3	2	Aminatou Seyni	Niger	23.16	Q
4	6	Basant Hemida	Egypt	23.22	Q, NR
5	4	Maggie Barrie	Sierra Leone	23.30	Q
6	6	Natacha Ngoye Akamabi	Republic of the Congo	23.35	Q
7	7	Rosemary Chukwuma	Nigeria	23.60	Q
8	3	Mercy Ntia-Obong	Nigeria	23.61	Q
9	2	Grace Obour	Ghana	23.76	Q
10	5	Mariam Bance	Burkina Faso	23.76	Q
11	6	Jacent Nyamahunge	Uganda	23.83	q
12	5	Milcent Ndoro	Kenya	23.84	Q
13	1	Loungo Matlhaku	Botswana	23.86	Q
14	6	Tamzin Thomas	South Africa	23.89	q
15	1	Rhodah Njobvu	Zambia	23.95	Q
16	3	Ndeye Arame Toure	Senegal	24.09	Q
17	1	Saka Souliatou Ajjouolakpe	Benin	24.11	Q
18	7	Tsaone Sebele	Botswana	24.14	Q
19	1	Fatou Sanneh	Gambia	24.17	q
20	4	Tjipekapora Herunga	Namibia	24.17	Q
21	3	Lumeka Katundu	Zambia	24.21	Q
22	4	Mariama Mamoudou	Niger	24.26	
23	1	Vanessa Embony	Madagascar	24.30	
24	5	Phumlile Sibonakele Ndzinisa	Eswatini	24.30	Q
25	7	N'da Akissi Bledja Kouassi	Ivory Coast	24.33	Q
26	4	Jasper Bukola Adekunle	Nigeria	24.36	
27	3	Fanny Appes Ekanga	Cameroon	24.39	
28	5	Gorete Semedo	São Tomé and Príncipe	24.50	
29	4	Maureen Nyatichi Thomas	Kenya	24.53	
30	3	Emily Nanziri	Uganda	24.66	
31	5	Fatmata Awolo	Sierra Leone	24.72	
32	2	Prenam Pesse	Togo	25.11	Q
33	7	Juliette Bouley	Togo	25.18	
34	6	Eveline Sanches	Cape Verde	25.27	
35	3	Pierrick Moulin	Gabon	25.34	
36	7	Koumba Sidibe	Mali	25.49	
37	7	Fayo Firehun	Ethiopia	25.55	
38	1	Seada Siraj	Ethiopia	25.61	
39	2	Faith Dube	Zimbabwe	25.78	
40	1	Abbangah Brahim Zenaba	Chad	25.94	
41	2	Alba Rosana Mbo Nchama	Equatorial Guinea	27.75	
42	4	Pilar Paula	Equatorial Guinea	28.66	
	2	Lucia Lucia	South Sudan	DQ	
	1	Assia Raziki	Morocco	DNS	
	2	Beatrice Masilingi	Namibia	DNS	
	2	Jemina Robinei	Central African Republic	DNS	
	3	Christelle Roxane Ore	Ivory Coast	DNS	
	5	Gemma Acheampong	Ghana	DNS	
	6	Eunice Kadogo	Kenya	DNS	

=== Semifinals ===
Qualification: First 2 in each semifinal (Q) and the next 2 fastest (q) advanced to the final.

Wind:
Heat 1: +0.2 m/s, Heat 2: -0.1 m/s, Heat 3: +0.5 m/s

Rank	Heat	Name	Nationality	Time	Notes
1	2	Gina Bass	Gambia	22.76	Q, NR
2	2	Basant Hemida	Egypt	22.83	Q, NR
3	1	Natacha Ngoye Akamabi	Republic of the Congo	23.05	Q
4	1	Aminatou Seyni	Niger	23.23	Q
5	3	Marie-Josée Ta Lou	Ivory Coast	23.30	Q
6	1	Maggie Barrie	Sierra Leone	23.35	q
7	1	Rosemary Chukwuma	Nigeria	23.67	q
8	2	Mercy Ntia-Obong	Nigeria	23.83	
9	3	Loungo Matlhaku	Botswana	23.89	Q
10	3	Rhodah Njobvu	Zambia	23.94	
11	2	Milcent Ndoro	Kenya	23.94	
12	1	Grace Obour	Ghana	24.03	
13	2	Tamzin Thomas	South Africa	24.07	
14	3	Mariam Bance	Burkina Faso	24.07	
15	1	Jacent Nyamahunge	Uganda	24.08	
16	3	Ndeye Arame Toure	Senegal	24.29	
17	1	Saka Souliatou Ajjouolakpe	Benin	24.34	
18	3	Fatou Sanneh	Gambia	24.35	
19	2	Tjipekapora Herunga	Namibia	24.49	
20	3	Lumeka Katundu	Zambia	24.53	
21	3	Phumlile Sibonakele Ndzinisa	Eswatini	24.68	
22	2	N'da Akissi Bledja Kouassi	Ivory Coast	24.92	
23	1	Prenam Pesse	Togo	25.25	
	2	Tsaone Sebele	Botswana	DNF	

=== Final ===
Wind: +1.8 m/s

Rank	Lane	Name	Nationality	Time	Notes
1st place, gold medalist(s)	5	Gina Bass	Gambia	22.58	NR
2nd place, silver medalist(s)	4	Basant Hemida	Egypt	22.89	
3rd place, bronze medalist(s)	3	Marie-Josée Ta Lou	Ivory Coast	23.00	
4	8	Aminatou Seyni	Niger	23.05	
5	6	Natacha Ngoye Akamabi	Republic of the Congo	23.44	
6	2	Maggie Barrie	Sierra Leone	23.57	
7	7	Loungo Matlhaku	Botswana	23.84	
	1	Rosemary Chukwuma	Nigeria	DNS	
