= 2016 African Championships in Athletics – Women's 100 metres =

The women's 100 metres event at the 2016 African Championships in Athletics was held on 22 and 23 June in Kings Park Stadium.

== Medalists ==
Gold	Silver	Bronze
Murielle Ahouré; Ivory Coast	Carina Horn; South Africa	Marie-Josée Ta Lou; Ivory Coast

== Results ==
=== Heats ===
Qualification: First 4 of each heat (Q) and the next 4 fastest (q) qualified for the semifinals.

Wind:
Heat 1: +0.1 m/s, Heat 2: +0.1 m/s, Heat 3: +0.6 m/s, Heat 4: +0.3 m/s, Heat 5: +1.8 m/s

Rank	Heat	Name	Nationality	Time	Notes
1	4	Marie-Josée Ta Lou	Ivory Coast	11.35	Q
2	3	Murielle Ahouré	Ivory Coast	11.42	Q
3	2	Assia Raziki	Morocco	11.45	Q
4	5	Carina Horn	South Africa	11.46	Q
5	2	Germaine Abessolo Bivina	Cameroon	11.55	Q, PB
6	4	Agnes Osazuwa	Nigeria	11.60	Q
7	3	Gina Bass	Gambia	11.66	Q
8	2	Phumlile Ndzinisa	Swaziland	11.67	Q
8	3	Ada Udaya	Liberia	11.67	Q
10	5	Gloria Asumnu	Nigeria	11.69	Q
11	2	Ngozi Musa	Sierra Leone	11.71	Q
12	5	Leungo Matlhaku	Botswana	11.72	Q
13	2	Marcelle Bouele Bondo	Republic of the Congo	11.77	q
14	5	Adeline Gouenon	Ivory Coast	11.78	Q
15	1	Gemma Acheampong	Ghana	11.84	Q
16	3	Beatrice Gyaman	Ghana	11.85	Q
17	1	Tebogo Mamatu	South Africa	11.86	Q
18	4	Persis Williams-Mensah	Ghana	11.97	Q
19	5	Joanne Loutoy	Seychelles	11.97	q
20	3	Marie Gisèle Eleme	Cameroon	12.04	q
22	1	Mildred Gamba	Uganda	12.07	Q
23	2	Eva Endiki	South Sudan	12.18	q, NR
23	5	Eunice Kadogo	Kenya	12.18	
25	4	Monicah Zephaniah	Kenya	12.20	Q
26	1	Ontiretse Molapisi	Botswana	12.37	Q
27	1	Jolene Jacobs	Namibia	12.52	
28	2	Franshia Mwangi	Kenya	12.57	
28	5	Prenam Pesse	Togo	12.57	
30	4	Yvonne Thomas	Zimbabwe	12.65	
31	1	Tsige Kebede	Ethiopia	12.83	
32	1	Sukoluhle Mlalazi	Zimbabwe	12.89	
	4	Alyssa Conley	South Africa	DQ	FS
	1	Ruddy Zang Milama	Gabon	DNS	
	2	Joanilla Janvier	Mauritius	DNS	
	3	Gabri Mgbemena	Zimbabwe	DNS	
	3	Hafsathu Kamara	Sierra Leone	DNS	
	3	Rachel Zenzo	Democratic Republic of the Congo	DNS	
	4	Labarang Charifa Benazir	Cameroon	DNS	

=== Semifinals ===
Qualification: First 2 of each heat (Q) and the next 2 fastest (q) qualified for the final.

Wind:
Heat 1: +1.2 m/s, Heat 2: +1.8 m/s, Heat 3: +1.3 m/s

Rank	Heat	Name	Nationality	Time	Notes
1	2	Murielle Ahouré	Ivory Coast	11.08	Q
2	3	Carina Horn	South Africa	11.14	Q
3	1	Marie-Josée Ta Lou	Ivory Coast	11.20	Q
4	2	Phumlile Ndzinisa	Swaziland	11.45	Q
5	3	Gloria Asumnu	Nigeria	11.51	Q
6	2	Leungo Matlhaku	Botswana	11.56	q
7	2	Tebogo Mamatu	South Africa	11.58	q
8	2	Agnes Osazuwa	Nigeria	11.59	
9	1	Gemma Acheampong	Ghana	11.60	Q
10	1	Gina Bass	Gambia	11.63	
11	1	Ada Udaya	Liberia	11.68	
11	3	Adeline Gouenon	Ivory Coast	11.68	
13	2	Beatrice Gyaman	Ghana	11.84	
14	1	Marie Gisèle Eleme	Cameroon	11.85	
15	1	Marcelle Bouele Bondo	Republic of the Congo	11.92	
16	2	Germaine Abessolo Bivina	Cameroon	11.96	
17	3	Joanne Loutoy	Seychelles	12.00	
18	3	Persis Williams-Mensah	Ghana	12.01	
19	3	Assia Raziki	Morocco	12.06	
20	1	Mildred Gamba	Uganda	12.23	
21	1	Monicah Zephaniah	Kenya	12.26	
22	2	Ontiretse Molapisi	Botswana	12.33	
	3	Eva Endiki	South Sudan	DNS	
	3	Ngozi Musa	Sierra Leone	DNS	

=== Final ===
Wind: +2.0 m/s

Rank	Lane	Athlete	Nationality	Time	Notes
1st place, gold medalist(s)	3	Murielle Ahouré	Ivory Coast	10.99	CR
2nd place, silver medalist(s)	6	Carina Horn	South Africa	11.07	
3rd place, bronze medalist(s)	5	Marie-Josée Ta Lou	Ivory Coast	11.15	
4	7	Gloria Asumnu	Nigeria	11.45	
5	4	Phumlile Ndzinisa	Swaziland	11.46	
6	2	Gemma Acheampong	Ghana	11.49	
7	1	Tebogo Mamatu	South Africa	11.54	
8	8	Leungo Matlhaku	Botswana	11.67	
