= Athletics at the 2018 Commonwealth Games – Women's 4 × 100 metres relay =

Women's 4 × 100 metres relay at the 2018 Commonwealth Games
- Venue: Carrara Stadium
- Dates: 14 April
- Nations: 8
- Winning time: 42.46

Medalists
gold medal	Asha Philip; Dina Asher-Smith; Bianca Williams; Lorraine Ugen	England
silver medal	Christania Williams; Natasha Morrison; Gayon Evans; Elaine Thompson	Jamaica
bronze medal	Joy Udo-Gabriel; Blessing Okagbare-Ighoteguonor; Oluwatobiloba Amusan; Rosemary Chukwuma	Nigeria

The women's 4 × 100 metres relay at the 2018 Commonwealth Games, as part of the athletics programme, took place in the Carrara Stadium on 14 April 2018.

The English team set an English record of 42.46 seconds to defeat the defending Jamaicans. Long jumper Lorraine Ugen, who had not run a relay in four years, replaced heat runner Corinne Humphreys in the England set-up at 24 hours' notice following an injury to Humphreys, and successfully managed to hold off Olympic champion Elaine Thompson on the anchor leg.

== Records ==
Prior to this competition, the existing world and Games records were as follows:

World record	United States (Tianna Madison, Allyson Felix, Bianca Knight, Carmelita Jeter)	40.82	London, United Kingdom	10 August 2012
Games record	Jamaica (Kerron Stewart, Veronica Campbell-Brown, Schillonie Calvert, Shelly-Ann Fraser-Pryce)	41.83	Glasgow, Scotland	2 August 2014

== Schedule ==
The schedule was as follows:

Date	Time	Round
Saturday 14 April 2018	14:57	Final

All times are Australian Eastern Standard Time (UTC+10)

== Results ==
With eight teams, the event was held as a straight final.

=== Final ===
Rank	Heat	Nation	Athletes	Result	Notes
1st place, gold medalist(s)	5	England	Asha Philip; Dina Asher-Smith; Bianca Williams; Lorraine Ugen	42.46	NR
2nd place, silver medalist(s)	1	Jamaica	Christania Williams; Natasha Morrison; Gayon Evans; Elaine Thompson	42.52	
3rd place, bronze medalist(s)	6	Nigeria	Joy Udo-Gabriel; Blessing Okagbare-Ighoteguonor; Oluwatobiloba Amusan; Rosemary Chukwuma	42.75	
4	8	Trinidad and Tobago	Khalifa St. Fort; Semoy Hackett; Reyare Thomas; Kai Selvon	43.50	
5	3	Ghana	Flings Owusu Agyapong; Gemma Acheampong; Halutie Hor; Janet Amponsah	43.64	
6	4	Cameroon	Germaine Abessolo Bivina; Marie Gisele Eleme; Irene Bell Bonong; Fanny Appes Ekanga	45.24	
–	2	Australia	Brianna Beahan; Maddie Coates; Riley Day; Melissa Breen	DQ	R 163.3a
–	7	Bahamas		DNS	
