= Athletics at the 2017 Islamic Solidarity Games – Results =

These are the results of the athletics competition at the 2017 Islamic Solidarity Games which took place on 16–20 May 2017 in Baku, Azerbaijan.

== Men's results ==
=== 100 metres ===
Heats – May 16
Wind:
Heat 1: -0.3 m/s, Heat 2: -0.9 m/s, Heat 3: NWI, Heat 4: -0.4 m/s, Heat 5: +0.3 m/s

Rank	Heat	Name	Nationality	Time	Notes
1	4	Andrew Fisher	Bahrain	10.20	Q
2	2	Femi Ogunode	Qatar	10.28	Q
3	5	Barakat Al-Harthi	Oman	10.29	Q
4	5	Emre Zafer Barnes	Turkey	10.33	Q
5	1	Saaid Hassan	Maldives	10.40	Q
6	1	Ramil Guliyev	Turkey	10.40	Q
7	5	Adama Jammeh	Gambia	10.41	Q
8	3	Arthur Gue Cissé	Ivory Coast	10.46	Q
9	2	Abdullah Mohammed	Saudi Arabia	10.48	Q
10	1	Jeffrey Vanan	Suriname	10.49	Q
11	5	Hassan Taftian	Iran	10.51	Q
12	4	Ahmed Majrashi	Saudi Arabia	10.60	Q
13	3	Ebrahima Camara	Gambia	10.61	Q
14	2	Emilien Aurel Tchan Bi Chan	Ivory Coast	10.65	Q
15	4	Khalid Al-Ghailani	Oman	10.68	Q
16	5	Ismail Kamara	Sierra Leone	10.75	q
17	3	Kokoutse Fabrice Dabla	Togo	10.78	Q
18	4	Assan Faye	Gambia	10.79	Q
19	2	Sudirman Hadi	Indonesia	10.79	Q
20	2	Abaid Ali	Pakistan	10.82	q
21	1	Muhammad Shahbaz	Pakistan	10.85	Q
22	5	Alisher Sadulayev	Turkmenistan	10.95	q
23	4	Zhamalidin Musaev	Kyrgyzstan	11.02	q
24	4	Kamran Asgarov	Azerbaijan	11.04	
25	3	Akmyrat Orazgeldiyev	Turkmenistan	11.12	Q, SB
26	5	Ramiz Malikov	Azerbaijan	11.26	
27	4	Ahmed Sarees	Maldives	11.28	
28	5	Abdur Rouf	Bangladesh	11.28	
29	2	Matar Mabrouk	Chad	11.30	
30	1	Mamadou Boukary Diallo	Guinea	11.39	
31	2	Mohammad Sayed Sahil	Afghanistan	11.78	
	1	Omar Juma Al-Salfa	United Arab Emirates	DNS	
	1	Kemarley Brown	Bahrain	DNS	
	3	Aziz Ouhadi	Morocco	DNS	
	3	Tosin Ogunode	Qatar	DNS	

Semi-finals – May 16
Wind:
Heat 1: +0.3 m/s, Heat 2: -0.2 m/s, Heat 3: -0.3 m/s

Rank	Heat	Name	Nationality	Time	Notes
1	1	Andrew Fisher	Bahrain	10.22	Q
2	3	Ramil Guliyev	Turkey	10.31	Q
3	3	Femi Ogunode	Qatar	10.32	Q
4	1	Emre Zafer Barnes	Turkey	10.35	Q
5	2	Barakat Al-Harthi	Oman	10.35	Q
6	2	Hassan Taftian	Iran	10.36	Q
7	2	Saaid Hassan	Maldives	10.40	q
8	3	Arthur Gue Cissé	Ivory Coast	10.42	q
9	3	Adama Jammeh	Gambia	10.48	
10	1	Abdullah Mohammed	Saudi Arabia	10.51	
11	1	Jeffrey Vanan	Suriname	10.58	
12	2	Ebrahima Camara	Gambia	10.66	
13	1	Emilien Aurel Tchan Bi Chan	Ivory Coast	10.66	
14	3	Khalid Al-Ghailani	Oman	10.73	
15	2	Kokoutse Fabrice Dabla	Togo	10.81	
16	1	Alisher Sadulayev	Turkmenistan	10.83	
17	2	Ahmed Majrashi	Saudi Arabia	10.85	
18	1	Assan Faye	Gambia	10.87	
19	1	Muhammad Shahbaz	Pakistan	10.93	
19	2	Ismail Kamara	Sierra Leone	10.93	
21	2	Abaid Ali	Pakistan	10.99	
22	3	Zhamalidin Musaev	Kyrgyzstan	11.03	
	3	Sudirman Hadi	Indonesia	DNS	
	3	Akmyrat Orazgeldiyev	Turkmenistan	DNS	

Final – May 16
Wind: +0.6 m/s

Rank	Lane	Name	Nationality	Time	Notes
1st place, gold medalist(s)	7	Ramil Guliyev	Turkey	10.06	
2nd place, silver medalist(s)	4	Andrew Fisher	Bahrain	10.16	
3rd place, bronze medalist(s)	5	Barakat Al-Harthi	Oman	10.35	
4	9	Saaid Hassan	Maldives	10.42	
5	8	Arthur Gue Cissé	Ivory Coast	10.43	
6	2	Emre Zafer Barnes	Turkey	10.45	
7	6	Femi Ogunode	Qatar	11.46	
8	3	Hassan Taftian	Iran	11.99	

=== 200 metres ===
Heats – May 17
Wind:
Heat 1: +1.4 m/s, Heat 2: +1.1 m/s, Heat 3: +1.0 m/s, Heat 4: +1.3 m/s, Heat 5: -0.2 m/s

Rank	Heat	Name	Nationality	Time	Notes
1	1	Abdoulie Assim	Gambia	21.29	Q
1	5	Winston George	Guyana	21.29	Q
3	4	İzzet Safer	Turkey	21.30	Q
4	2	Ramil Guliyev	Turkey	21.33	Q
5	2	Salem Eid Yaqoob	Bahrain	21.34	Q
6	4	Jeffrey Vanan	Suriname	21.36	Q
7	2	Kokoutse Fabrice Dabla	Togo	21.49	Q
8	3	Skander Djamil Athmani	Algeria	21.51	Q
9	4	Saaid Hassan	Maldives	21.53	Q
10	1	Emilien Aurel Tchan Bi Chan	Ivory Coast	21.61	Q
11	2	Ismail Kamara	Sierra Leone	21.61	Q
12	3	Adama Jammeh	Gambia	21.61	Q
13	1	Liaquat Ali	Pakistan	21.74	Q
14	4	Soufiane Bouhadda	Algeria	21.78	Q
15	4	Omar Juma Al-Salfa	United Arab Emirates	21.80	q
16	2	Muhammad Shahbaz	Pakistan	21.81	q
17	1	Alisher Sadulayev	Turkmenistan	21.83	Q
18	1	Muhammad Noor Ar-Rasyid	Brunei	21.88	q
19	5	Yevgeniy Kasilov	Azerbaijan	21.97	Q
20	4	Zhamalidin Musaev	Kyrgyzstan	22.56	q
21	3	Arif Abbasov	Azerbaijan	22.65	Q
22	3	Ahmed Sarees	Maldives	22.95	Q
23	5	Sesay Bockarie	Sierra Leone	23.45	Q
24	2	Mohammad Sayed Sahil	Afghanistan	23.78	
	1	Abdur Rouf	Bangladesh	DNF	
	1	Andrew Fisher	Bahrain	DNF	
	4	Ali Khadivar	Iran	DNF	
	5	Khalid Al-Ghailani	Oman	DNF	
	5	Matar Mabrouk	Chad	DNF	
	2	Arthur Gue Cissé	Ivory Coast	DNS	
	3	Mamadou Boukary Diallo	Guinea	DNS	
	3	Aziz Ouhadi	Morocco	DNS	
	5	Femi Ogunode	Qatar	DNS	
	5	Hassan Taftian	Iran	DNS	

Semi-finals – May 17
Wind:
Heat 1: +0.6 m/s, Heat 2: +1.6 m/s, Heat 3: +0.6 m/s

Rank	Heat	Name	Nationality	Time	Notes
1	3	Winston George	Guyana	20.87	Q
2	3	Ramil Guliyev	Turkey	20.99	Q
3	2	Adama Jammeh	Gambia	21.11	Q
4	1	Salem Eid Yaqoob	Bahrain	21.11	Q
5	2	İzzet Safer	Turkey	21.17	Q
6	1	Jeffrey Vanan	Suriname	21.25	Q
7	1	Saaid Hassan	Maldives	21.30	q
8	2	Skander Djamil Athmani	Algeria	21.37	q
9	3	Emilien Aurel Tchan Bi Chan	Ivory Coast	21.45	
10	1	Abdoulie Assim	Gambia	21.49	
11	3	Kokoutse Fabrice Dabla	Togo	21.62	
12	3	Ismail Kamara	Sierra Leone	21.70	
13	2	Muhammad Noor Ar-Rasyid	Brunei	21.71	SB
14	1	Liaquat Ali	Pakistan	21.73	
15	2	Muhammad Shahbaz	Pakistan	21.76	
16	2	Yevgeniy Kasilov	Azerbaijan	21.96	
17	2	Alisher Sadulayev	Turkmenistan	21.97	
18	1	Omar Juma Al-Salfa	United Arab Emirates	22.00	
19	3	Arif Abbasov	Azerbaijan	22.45	
20	3	Zhamalidin Musaev	Kyrgyzstan	22.53	
21	3	Ahmed Sarees	Maldives	23.15	
	2	Sesay Bockarie	Sierra Leone	DQ	R163.3b
	1	Soufiane Bouhadda	Algeria	DNS	

Final – May 18
Wind: +0.6 m/s

Rank	Lane	Name	Nationality	Time	Notes
1st place, gold medalist(s)	7	Ramil Guliyev	Turkey	20.08	
2nd place, silver medalist(s)	5	Salem Eid Yaqoob	Bahrain	20.56	
3rd place, bronze medalist(s)	6	Winston George	Guyana	20.62	
4	4	Adama Jammeh	Gambia	20.86	
5	9	İzzet Safer	Turkey	21.12	
6	3	Saaid Hassan	Maldives	21.23	
7	8	Jeffrey Vanan	Suriname	21.25	
8	2	Skander Djamil Athmani	Algeria	21.38	

=== 400 metres ===
Heats – May 16

Rank	Heat	Name	Nationality	Time	Notes
1	1	Ali Khadivar	Iran	45.85	Q
2	1	Winston George	Guyana	46.15	Q
3	1	Samson Oghenew Nathaniel	Nigeria	46.32	q
4	1	Ahmed Mubarak Salah	Oman	46.63	q
5	1	Yavuz Can	Turkey	46.64	
6	2	Abbas Abubakar Abbas	Bahrain	46.74	Q
7	3	Batuhan Altıntaş	Turkey	46.80	Q
8	2	Soufiane Bouhadda	Algeria	46.84	Q
9	2	Abdallah Souleyman	Saudi Arabia	47.11	PB
10	3	Ali Khamis Khamis	Bahrain	47.23	Q
11	3	Bachir Mahamat	Chad	48.23	SB
12	2	Mohamad Arif Alet	Malaysia	48.39	
13	3	Yevgeniy Kasilov	Azerbaijan	48.49	
14	3	Arif Abbasov	Azerbaijan	48.83	
15	1	Asad Iqbal	Pakistan	49.08	
16	2	Kirill Sarasov	Kyrgyzstan	49.17	
17	2	Jean Marc Allokoua	Ivory Coast	49.65	
18	2	Sesay Bockarie	Sierra Leone	49.82	
19	1	Messoud Messoud	Mauritania	52.35	
20	1	Lansana Sylla	Guinea	55.22	
	2	Sadat Umar	Pakistan	DQ	R163.3b
	3	Othman Al-Busaidi	Oman	DNS	
	3	Ali Hassan Al-Jassim	Qatar	DNS	

Final – May 17

Rank	Lane	Name	Nationality	Time	Notes
1st place, gold medalist(s)	9	Ali Khamis Khamis	Bahrain	45.54	
2nd place, silver medalist(s)	7	Winston George	Guyana	45.69	
3rd place, bronze medalist(s)	6	Ali Khadivar	Iran	45.92	
4	2	Ahmed Mubarak Salah	Oman	46.58	
5	5	Batuhan Altıntaş	Turkey	46.82	
6	4	Abbas Abubakar Abbas	Bahrain	47.19	
7	3	Samson Oghenew Nathaniel	Nigeria	47.24	
	8	Soufiane Bouhadda	Algeria	DNS	

=== 800 metres ===
Heats – May 17

Rank	Heat	Name	Nationality	Time	Notes
1	2	Mostafa Smaili	Morocco	1:48.04	Q
2	2	Abraham Kipchirch Rotich	Bahrain	1:48.51	Q
3	2	Salim Abu Mayanja	Uganda	1:49.12	Q
4	2	Wesam Al-Massri	Palestine	1:49.65	q
5	1	Oussama Nabil	Morocco	1:50.77	Q
6	1	Mohamed El Amin Belferar	Algeria	1:50.83	Q
7	1	Riadh Chninni	Tunisia	1:51.01	Q
8	1	Ihab Jabbar Hashi Hashim	Iraq	1:51.75	q
9	1	Saud Hashi Al-Zaabi	United Arab Emirates	1:52.34	
10	1	Budiman Holle	Indonesia	1:53.05	
11	2	Musulman Dzholomanov	Kyrgyzstan	1:53.70	
12	2	Mohammed Al-Balooshi	United Arab Emirates	1:55.89	
13	1	Abdisalam Ahmed	Somalia	1:57.13	
14	2	Khalid Ibrahim	Saudi Arabia	2:00.13	
	2	Alberto Mamba	Mozambique	DQ	R163.3b

Final – May 18

Rank	Name	Nationality	Time	Notes
1st place, gold medalist(s)	Mostafa Smaili	Morocco	1:45.78	
2nd place, silver medalist(s)	Riadh Chninni	Tunisia	1:46.24	PB
3rd place, bronze medalist(s)	Mohamed El Amin Belferar	Algeria	1:46.44	
4	Oussama Nabil	Morocco	1:46.68	SB
5	Wesam Al-Massri	Palestine	1:47.04	
6	Salim Abu Mayanja	Uganda	1:47.17	
7	Ihab Jabbar Hashi Hashim	Iraq	1:47.34	PB
8	Abraham Kipchirch Rotich	Bahrain	1:47.46	

=== 1500 metres ===
Heats – May 19

Rank	Heat	Name	Nationality	Time	Notes
1	1	Sadik Mikhou	Bahrain	3:45.11	Q
2	1	Brahim Kaazouzi	Morocco	3:46.68	Q
3	1	Salim Abu Mayanja	Uganda	3:47.30	Q
4	1	Ali Messaoudi	Algeria	3:47.43	Q
5	1	Ramazan Özdemir	Turkey	3:47.43	q
6	1	Abdi Waiss Mouhyadin	Djibouti	3:51.06	q
7	1	Saud Al-Zaabi	United Arab Emirates	3:51.59	q
8	2	Fouad Elkaam	Morocco	3:54.33	Q
9	1	Ahmad Luth Hamizan	Malaysia	3:55.12	q, SB
10	2	Mohammed Shaween	Saudi Arabia	3:55.95	Q
11	2	Benson Kiplagat Seurei	Bahrain	3:56.96	Q
12	2	Ali Hassan	Somalia	3:57.83	Q
13	2	Musulman Dzholomanov	Kyrgyzstan	3:58.27	
14	1	Hussain Fazeel	Maldives	4:03.43	SB
	2	Ayanleh Souleiman	Djibouti	DNS	
	2	Riadh Chninni	Tunisia	DNS	
	2	Ihab Jabbar Hashi Hashim	Iraq	DNS	
	2	Wesam Al-Massri	Palestine	DNS	

Final – May 20

Rank	Name	Nationality	Time	Notes
1st place, gold medalist(s)	Sadik Mikhou	Bahrain	3:36.64	
2nd place, silver medalist(s)	Fouad Elkaam	Morocco	3:37.81	
3rd place, bronze medalist(s)	Brahim Kaazouzi	Morocco	3:38.24	
4	Benson Kiplagat Seurei	Bahrain	3:39.99	
5	Salim Abu Mayanja	Uganda	3:42.90	
6	Ali Messaoudi	Algeria	3:44.72	
7	Ramazan Özdemir	Turkey	3:52.51	
8	Ahmad Luth Hamizan	Malaysia	3:53.33	SB
9	Ali Hassan	Somalia	3:54.51	
10	Saud Al-Zaabi	United Arab Emirates	3:58.95	
	Mohammed Shaween	Saudi Arabia	DNF	
	Abdi Waiss Mouhyadin	Djibouti	DNS	

=== 5000 metres ===
May 16

Rank	Name	Nationality	Time	Notes
1st place, gold medalist(s)	Younés Essalhi	Morocco	13:27.64	
2nd place, silver medalist(s)	Soufiyan Bouqantar	Morocco	13:28.69	
3rd place, bronze medalist(s)	Mohamed Ismail Ibrahim	Djibouti	13:29.29	PB
4	Hayle Ibrahimov	Azerbaijan	13:29.76	
5	Ali Kaya	Turkey	13:30.24	
6	Ibrahim Ismael Hassan	Djibouti	13:30.33	PB
7	Linus Kiplagat	Bahrain	13:35.53	
8	Aweke Ayalew	Bahrain	13:36.31	
9	Ramazan Özdemir	Turkey	13:37.58	
10	Tariq Al-Amri	Saudi Arabia	13:40.06	
11	Agus Prayogo	Indonesia	14:36.20	SB
12	Abidine Abidine	Mauritania	15:18.83	SB
13	Hussain Fazeel	Maldives	15:36.96	SB
14	Zaid Shareef	Maldives	16:21.40	
	Sohail Amir	Pakistan	DNS	

=== 10,000 metres ===
May 20

Rank	Name	Nationality	Time	Notes
1st place, gold medalist(s)	Abraham Cheroben	Bahrain	27:38.76	
2nd place, silver medalist(s)	Kaan Kigen Özbilen	Turkey	27:41.99	
3rd place, bronze medalist(s)	Soufiyan Bouqantar	Morocco	27:47.59	
4	Ali Kaya	Turkey	27:54.41	
5	Evans Kiplagat Barkowet	Azerbaijan	28:55.82	
6	Ibrahim Ismael Hassan	Djibouti	29:15.04	PB
7	Adilet Kyshtakbekov	Kyrgyzstan	30:08.25	SB
8	Andrey Petrov	Uzbekistan	30:34.52	
9	Mohanad Ali	Palestine	32:08.55	SB
10	Hayle Ibrahimov	Azerbaijan	DNF	

=== 110 metres hurdles ===
May 17
Wind: -1.1 m/s

Rank	Lane	Name	Nationality	Time	Notes
1st place, gold medalist(s)	5	Ahmed Almuwallad	Saudi Arabia	13.68	
2nd place, silver medalist(s)	2	Rahib Mammadov	Azerbaijan	14.18	
3rd place, bronze medalist(s)	4	Mohammed Sad Al-Khfaji	Iraq	14.20	
4	3	Mohd Rizzua Haiz Muhamad	Malaysia	14.59	
	6	Mustafa Güneş	Turkey	DNF	

=== 400 metres hurdles ===
May 19

Rank	Lane	Name	Nationality	Time	Notes
1st place, gold medalist(s)	9	Creve Armando Machava	Mozambique	50.73	
2nd place, silver medalist(s)	1	Amadou Ndiaye	Senegal	50.94	
3rd place, bronze medalist(s)	7	Kurt Couto	Mozambique	50.97	
4	4	Mehboob Ali	Pakistan	51.15	
5	5	Abdullah Mulayhi	Saudi Arabia	51.29	
5	8	Nokar Hussaini	Pakistan	51.29	PB
7	6	Enis Ünsal	Turkey	51.31	
8	3	Mohamed-Reda El Bilaoui	Morocco	52.54	SB
	2	Sinan Ören	Turkey	DQ	R162.7

=== 3000 metres steeplechase ===
May 18

Rank	Name	Nationality	Time	Notes
1st place, gold medalist(s)	Mohamed Tindouft	Morocco	8:26.26	SB
2nd place, silver medalist(s)	Mohamed Ismail Ibrahim	Djibouti	8:31.59	SB
3rd place, bronze medalist(s)	Aras Kaya	Turkey	8:32.68	
4	John Kibet Koech	Bahrain	8:34.27	
5	Ali Messaoudi	Algeria	8:38.00	
6	Evans Rutto Chematot	Bahrain	8:48.46	
7	Ahmad Luth Hamizan	Malaysia	9:08.22	SB

=== 4 × 100 metres relay ===
May 19

Rank	Lane	Nation	Competitors	Time	Notes
1st place, gold medalist(s)	9	Bahrain	Saeed Al-Khaldi, Salem Eid Yaqoob, Musa Isah, Andrew Fisher	39.55	
2nd place, silver medalist(s)	2	Turkey	Yiğitcan Hekimoğlu, İzzet Safer, Emre Zafer Barnes, Ramil Guliyev	39.56	
3rd place, bronze medalist(s)	7	Ivory Coast	Thierry Konan, Emilien Aurel Tchan Bi Chan, Jean Marc Allokoua, Arthur Gue Cissé	39.82	
4	3	Gambia	Adama Jammeh, Abdoulie Assim, Ebrahima Camara, Alieu Joof	40.20	
5	8	Oman	Samir Al-Riyami, Barakat Al-Harthi, Mohamed Obaid Al-Saadi, Rashid Al-Aasmi	40.37	
6	5	Saudi Arabia	Ahmed Almuwallad, Ahmed Majrashi, Mohammed Abdullah, Abdullah Mohammed	40.61	
	6	Pakistan	Abaid Ali, Liaquat Ali, Muhammad Shahbaz, Nokar Hussain	DQ	163.3b
	4	Azerbaijan	Kamran Asgarov, Yevgeniy Kasilov, Ramiz Malikov, Rahib Mammadov	DQ	R170.7

=== 4 × 400 metres relay ===
May 20

Rank	Nation	Competitors	Time	Notes
1st place, gold medalist(s)	Turkey	Enis Ünsal, Batuhan Altıntaş, Sinan Ören, Yavuz Can	3:06.83	
2nd place, silver medalist(s)	Pakistan	Asad Iqbal, Umar Sadat, Nokar Hussain, Mehboob Ali	3:07.62	
3rd place, bronze medalist(s)	Oman	Salad Al-Ajmi, Mohamed Obaid Al-Saadi, Usama Al-Gheilani, Ahmed Mubarak Salah	3:08.94	
4	Bahrain	Ali Khamis Khamis, Salem Eid Yaqoob, Saeed Al-Khaldi, Musa Isah	3:11.11	
5	United Arab Emirates	Ali Mohammad, Mohammed Al-Balooshi, Saud Al-Zaabi, Omar Juma Al-Salfa	3:25.05	

=== High jump ===
May 19

Rank	Name	Nationality	1.95	2.00	2.05	2.10	2.15	2.19	2.22	2.24	2.26	2.28	2.31	Result	Notes
1st place, gold medalist(s)	Majd Eddin Ghazal	Syria	–	–	–	–	xo	o	o	o	o	o	xxx	2.28	
2nd place, silver medalist(s)	Mohamat Allamine Hamdi	Qatar	–	o	o	o	o	o	o	xo	o	xxx		2.26	SB
3rd place, bronze medalist(s)	Keivan Ghanbarzadeh	Iran	–	–	–	o	o	o	xxo	xo	x–	xx		2.24	SB
4	Hussein Al-Ibraheemi	Iraq	–	o	o	o	o	xo	xxx					2.19	
5	Alperen Acet	Turkey	–	–	o	xo	o	xxo	xxx					2.19	
6	Norshafie Mohd Shah	Malaysia	–	xo	xo	xo	xxx							2.10	
7	Fernand Djoumessi	Cameroon	–	–	o	x–	xx							2.05	
7	Azer Ahmadov	Azerbaijan	o	o	o	xxx								2.05	SB

=== Pole vault ===
May 20

Rank	Name	Nationality	4.80	4.90	5.00	5.10	5.20	5.25	5.30	5.35	5.40	5.55	5.70	Result	Notes
1st place, gold medalist(s)	Hussain Al-Hizam	Saudi Arabia	–	–	o	o	o	xo	o	xo	–	o	xx	5.55	
2nd place, silver medalist(s)	Mohamed Amine Romdhana	Tunisia	–	–	o	–	o	–	xo	xx–	x			5.30	
3rd place, bronze medalist(s)	Hichem Khalil Cherabi	Algeria	–	–	o	–	x–	o	xx–	x				5.25	
4	Ümit Sungur	Turkey	o	–	x–	o	o	x–	xx					5.20	
5	Muntadher Faleh Abdulwahid	Iraq	–	–	–	xxo	x–	x–	x					5.10	
6	Ali Mohsin Alateej	Iraq	–	o	o	xxx								5.00	

=== Long jump ===
May 19

Rank	Name	Nationality	#1	#2	#3	#4	#5	#6	Result	Notes
1st place, gold medalist(s)	Yahya Berrabah	Morocco	7.74	8.07	x	x	–	–	8.07	SB
2nd place, silver medalist(s)	Miguel van Assen	Suriname	7.41	7.61	7.44	7.43	7.52	7.63	7.63	
3rd place, bronze medalist(s)	Mouhcine Khoua	Morocco	x	7.42	7.62	x	x	x	7.62	
4	Romeo N'Tia	Benin	7.44	x	7.26	7.39	7.59	x	7.59	SB
5	Thierry Konan	Ivory Coast	x	7.54	7.57	7.24	x	–	7.57	
6	Alper Kulaksız	Turkey	x	7.26	7.45	7.55	7.30	7.53	7.55	SB
7	Hamoud Olwani	Saudi Arabia	7.45	x	x	7.53	7.20	7.35	7.53	PB
8	Emanuel Archibald	Guyana	7.25	7.36	6.98	6.89	6.67	6.72	7.36	SB
9	Nazim Babayev	Azerbaijan	x	7.30	7.17				7.30	
10	Marcel Richard Mayack II	Cameroon	7.08	7.06	7.20				7.20	
11	Muhannad Qasem Al-Absi	Saudi Arabia	7.17	x	4.93				7.17	
12	Muhammad Afzal	Pakistan	7.15	x	x				7.15	
13	Muhammad Imran	Pakistan	6.77	x	6.97				6.97	
14	Yasser Mohamed Tah Triki	Algeria	3.86	6.86	–				6.86	
	Orkhan Aslanov	Azerbaijan	x	x	x				NM	

=== Triple jump ===
May 17

Rank	Name	Nationality	#1	#2	#3	#4	#5	#6	Result	Notes
1st place, gold medalist(s)	Nazim Babayev	Azerbaijan	16.64	14.94	x	16.59	17.15	x	17.15	
2nd place, silver medalist(s)	Alexis Copello	Azerbaijan	x	x	16.42	16.82	x	16.90	16.90	
3rd place, bronze medalist(s)	Miguel van Assen	Suriname	15.71	15.77	16.14	16.20	16.64	16.04	16.64	SB
4	Mamadou Chérif Dia	Mali	x	15.74	16.29	x	15.80	15.84	16.29	
5	Yasser Mohamed Tah Triki	Algeria	15.77	16.14	x	x	x	–	16.14	
6	Aşkın Karaca	Turkey	15.84	x	14.74	15.62	x	13.87	15.84	SB
7	Hassan Nasser Dawshi	Saudi Arabia	15.64	14.89	x	14.66	15.09	14.75	15.64	
8	Muhammad Afzal	Pakistan	15.49	15.05	15.25	x	15.58	15.16	15.58	
9	Marouane Aissaoui	Morocco	15.21	15.37	x				15.37	
10	Rashid Ahmed Al-Mannai	Qatar	x	x	15.31				15.31	
11	Marcel Richard Mayack II	Cameroon	14.47	14.96	15.28				15.28	SB
12	Louhab Kafia	Algeria	x	x	15.23				15.23	
13	Emanuel Archibald	Guyana	13.11	13.34	–				13.34	

=== Shot put ===
May 20

Rank	Name	Nationality	#1	#2	#3	#4	#5	#6	Result	Notes
1st place, gold medalist(s)	Osman Can Özdeveci	Turkey	19.83	x	x	19.05	19.35	18.96	19.83	
2nd place, silver medalist(s)	Sultan Al-Hebshi	Saudi Arabia	18.06	18.86	19.17	19.54	18.88	19.56	19.56	
3rd place, bronze medalist(s)	Sergey Dementev	Uzbekistan	17.73	x	x	17.77	17.78	18.56	18.56	
4	Ali Samari	Iran	x	18.10	17.78	x	18.54	18.42	18.54	
5	Ameen Al-Aradi	Saudi Arabia	16.58	17.33	x	17.19	17.46	x	17.46	SB
6	Tofig Mammadov	Azerbaijan	15.70	15.33	15.53	15.80	16.22	x	16.22	SB
7	Maksat Mammedov	Turkmenistan	15.47	15.23	15.80	15.76	16.11	15.90	16.11	
8	Mosab Aesha	Syria	15.64	15.54	15.36	x	15.46	15.47	15.64	
9	Tejen Hommadov	Turkmenistan	14.08	x	14.45				14.45	

=== Discus throw ===
May 16

Rank	Name	Nationality	#1	#2	#3	#4	#5	#6	Result	Notes
1st place, gold medalist(s)	Mustafa Dagher Al-Saamah	Iraq	x	58.66	58.52	60.47	60.89	54.90	60.89	NR
2nd place, silver medalist(s)	Ehsan Haddadi	Iran	59.96	59.98	60.37	60.54	x	58.70	60.54	
3rd place, bronze medalist(s)	Sultan Al-Dawoodi	Saudi Arabia	57.37	57.47	x	53.89	58.63	x	58.63	
4	Ahmed Mohammed Dheeb	Qatar	55.04	x	x	57.70	58.24	57.97	58.24	
5	Elbachir Mbarki	Morocco	52.28	53.21	x	55.28	x	54.93	55.28	SB
6	Mohamed Ibrahim Moaaz	Qatar	53.39	53.66	54.15	x	x	x	54.15	
7	Osama Hassan Al-Oqayli	Saudi Arabia	47.27	50.58	x	x	49.69	x	50.58	
8	Ismail Aliyev	Azerbaijan	42.35	x	42.30	45.90	43.76	x	45.90	

=== Hammer throw ===
May 18

Rank	Name	Nationality	#1	#2	#3	#4	#5	#6	Result	Notes
1st place, gold medalist(s)	Eşref Apak	Turkey	x	x	x	74.32	72.63	72.78	74.32	SB
2nd place, silver medalist(s)	Özkan Baltacı	Turkey	71.84	72.90	74.13	72.98	71.92	x	74.13	
3rd place, bronze medalist(s)	Ashraf Amgad Elseify	Qatar	71.48	72.64	70.92	72.98	73.17	72.92	73.17	
4	Rez Moghaddamkordmahalle	Iran	66.55	70.90	69.27	66.54	x	68.05	70.90	
5	Suhrob Khodjaev	Uzbekistan	70.31	x	x	69.09	68.86	70.25	70.31	
6	Mergen Mamedov	Turkmenistan	x	66.52	65.59	x	65.62	x	66.52	
7	Ahmed Elseify	Qatar	x	66.28	x	x	x	x	66.28	
8	Mohammed Al-Dubaisi	Saudi Arabia	58.20	59.68	x	59.80	59.27	61.98	61.98	

=== Javelin throw ===
May 19

Rank	Name	Nationality	#1	#2	#3	#4	#5	#6	Result	Notes
1st place, gold medalist(s)	Ahmed Bader Magour	Qatar	76.65	83.45	82.69	–	76.44	–	83.45	
2nd place, silver medalist(s)	Ivan Zaytsev	Uzbekistan	75.13	78.15	78.66	x	x	73.44	78.66	
3rd place, bronze medalist(s)	Arshad Nadeem	Pakistan	69.25	73.08	x	76.33	74.95	x	76.33	
4	Emin Öncel	Turkey	73.13	75.42	74.54	74.82	74.41	74.49	75.42	
5	Ali Al-Abdulghani	Saudi Arabia	65.62	66.77	72.37	70.54	65.36	70.08	72.37	
6	Mohamad Mohd Kaida	Qatar	x	63.49	68.76	68.03	x	65.81	68.76	
7	Abdallah Charaii	Morocco	61.39	63.24	65.42	66.61	65.70	65.74	66.61	
8	Muhammad Yasir	Pakistan	61.67	63.41	65.20	64.20	62.97	x	65.20	
9	Orxan Qasimov	Azerbaijan	54.46	56.97	60.49				60.49	

== Women's results ==
=== 100 metres ===
Heats – May 16
Wind:
Heat 1: -0.6 m/s, Heat 2: -0.3 m/s, Heat 3: +0.9 m/s, Heat 4: -0.2 m/s

Rank	Heat	Name	Nationality	Time	Notes
1	1	Gina Bass	Gambia	11.57	Q
2	3	Mizgin Ay	Turkey	11.73	Q
3	3	Nigina Sharipova	Uzbekistan	11.74	Q
4	2	Iman Essa Jasim	Bahrain	11.76	Q
5	2	Zakiyya Hasanova	Azerbaijan	11.78	Q
6	4	Pazhan Ahmed	Iraq	11.85	Q, NR
7	4	Hajar Alkhaldi	Bahrain	11.86	Q
8	1	Rashidat Lawal	Nigeria	11.92	Q
9	4	Mazoon Al-Alawi	Oman	12.02	Q, NR
10	1	Marie Gisele Eleme Asse	Cameroon	12.05	Q
10	1	Valentina Meredova	Turkmenistan	12.05	Q, SB
10	4	Nimet Karakuş	Turkey	12.05	q
13	4	Dolly Mustapha	Sierra Leone	12.06	q
14	3	Char Abdoullahi Labarang	Cameroon	12.10	Q
15	1	Yelena Pekhtireva	Azerbaijan	12.13	q
16	2	Farzaneh Fasihi	Iran	12.14	Q
17	2	Mariatu Koroma	Sierra Leone	12.42	
18	2	Alaa Hikmat Al-Qaysi	Iraq	12.47	
19	1	Prenam Pesse	Togo	12.58	
20	3	Sahibe Asra	Pakistan	12.59	
21	1	Adjoua Tryphène Kouamé	Ivory Coast	12.77	
22	3	Saoudatou Touré	Guinea	12.80	
23	2	Ange Benedicte N'Dri	Ivory Coast	13.01	
24	4	Samra Shabbir	Pakistan	13.38	
25	4	Kimia Yousofi	Afghanistan	13.94	
26	3	Dana Al-Shehri	Saudi Arabia	14.50	NR
	3	Alida Sikder	Bangladesh	DNS	

Semi-finals – May 16
Wind:
Heat 1: +0.2 m/s, Heat 2: -0.1 m/s

Rank	Heat	Name	Nationality	Time	Notes
1	1	Gina Bass	Gambia	11.51	Q, SB
2	1	Nigina Sharipova	Uzbekistan	11.71	Q
3	2	Zakiyya Hasanova	Azerbaijan	11.76	Q
4	2	Iman Essa Jasim	Bahrain	11.80	Q
5	1	Hajar Alkhaldi	Bahrain	11.80	Q
6	2	Mizgin Ay	Turkey	11.84	Q
7	1	Nimet Karakuş	Turkey	11.84	q
8	2	Marie Gisele Eleme Asse	Cameroon	11.85	q
9	1	Pazhan Ahmed	Iraq	11.88	SB
10	2	Rashidat Lawal	Nigeria	11.89	
11	1	Yelena Pekhtireva	Azerbaijan	11.97	
12	2	Valentina Meredova	Turkmenistan	12.03	SB
13	1	Mazoon Al-Alawi	Oman	12.09	SB
14	2	Farzaneh Fasihi	Iran	12.12	
15	2	Dolly Mustapha	Sierra Leone	12.15	
16	1	Char Abdoullahi Labarang	Cameroon	12.26	

Final – May 16
Wind: +1.1 m/s

Rank	Lane	Name	Nationality	Time	Notes
1st place, gold medalist(s)	6	Gina Bass	Gambia	11.56	
2nd place, silver medalist(s)	7	Nigina Sharipova	Uzbekistan	11.65	
3rd place, bronze medalist(s)	8	Mizgin Ay	Turkey	11.71	
4	4	Zakiyya Hasanova	Azerbaijan	11.72	NR
5	2	Hajar Alkhaldi	Bahrain	11.75	
6	5	Iman Essa Jasim	Bahrain	11.78	
7	3	Nimet Karakuş	Turkey	11.87	
8	9	Marie Gisele Eleme Asse	Cameroon	11.99	

=== 200 metres ===
Heats – May 17
Wind:
Heat 1: -0.3 m/s, Heat 2: -0.1 m/s, Heat 3: -0.4 m/s, Heat 4: -1.3 m/s

Rank	Heat	Name	Nationality	Time	Notes
1	1	Gina Bass	Gambia	23.84	Q
2	1	Assia Raziki	Morocco	24.03	Q
3	4	Nigina Sharipova	Uzbekistan	24.04	Q
4	3	Edidiong Odiong	Bahrain	24.13	Q
5	4	Zakiyya Hasanova	Azerbaijan	24.19	Q
6	4	Mizgin Ay	Turkey	24.26	Q
7	4	Pazhan Ahmed	Iraq	24.44	q, SB
8	3	Khadija Ouardi	Morocco	24.55	Q
9	1	Dana Hussain	Iraq	24.58	Q
10	3	Char Abdoullahi Labarang	Cameroon	24.60	Q
11	2	Dolly Mustapha	Sierra Leone	24.61	Q
11	2	Nimet Karakuş	Turkey	24.61	Q
13	2	Germaine Abessolo Bivina	Cameroon	24.63	Q
14	1	Prenam Pesse	Togo	24.90	q, PB
15	4	Najima Parveen	Pakistan	25.50	q
16	1	Sahibe Asra	Pakistan	25.95	q
17	3	Adjoua Tryphène Kouamé	Ivory Coast	26.11	
18	2	Nazan Azmammadli	Azerbaijan	26.37	
19	3	Maryan Muse	Somalia	30.65	
	1	Mariatu Koroma	Sierra Leone	DQ	R163.3b
	3	Alita Moore	Guyana	DQ	R163.3b
	2	Salwa Eid Naser	Bahrain	DNF	
	1	Ange Benedicte N'Dri	Ivory Coast	DNS	
	2	Kimia Yousofi	Afghanistan	DNS	
	3	Saoudatou Touré	Guinea	DNS	
	4	Farzaneh Fasihi	Iran	DNS	

Semi-finals – May 17
Wind:
Heat 1: +0.4 m/s, Heat 2: +0.1 m/s

Rank	Heat	Name	Nationality	Time	Notes
1	1	Gina Bass	Gambia	23.73	Q
2	2	Edidiong Odiong	Bahrain	23.75	Q
3	2	Assia Raziki	Morocco	23.92	Q
4	2	Zakiyya Hasanova	Azerbaijan	24.00	Q
5	2	Nigina Sharipova	Uzbekistan	24.05	q
6	1	Dana Hussain	Iraq	24.27	Q
7	2	Mizgin Ay	Turkey	24.34	q
8	1	Germaine Abessolo Bivina	Cameroon	24.38	Q
9	1	Nimet Karakuş	Turkey	24.40	
10	1	Khadija Ouardi	Morocco	24.47	
11	1	Dolly Mustapha	Sierra Leone	24.58	
12	2	Pazhan Ahmed	Iraq	24.67	
13	2	Char Abdoullahi Labarang	Cameroon	24.94	
14	1	Prenam Pesse	Togo	25.46	
15	1	Najima Parveen	Pakistan	25.67	
16	2	Sahibe Asra	Pakistan	25.98	

Final – May 18
Wind: +1.7 m/s

Rank	Lane	Name	Nationality	Time	Notes
1st place, gold medalist(s)	6	Edidiong Odiong	Bahrain	22.95	
2nd place, silver medalist(s)	4	Gina Bass	Gambia	23.15	
3rd place, bronze medalist(s)	3	Nigina Sharipova	Uzbekistan	23.66	SB
4	9	Zakiyya Hasanova	Azerbaijan	23.76	
5	7	Assia Raziki	Morocco	23.77	
6	2	Mizgin Ay	Turkey	24.14	
7	8	Germaine Abessolo Bivina	Cameroon	24.44	
	5	Dana Hussain	Iraq	DNS	

=== 400 metres ===
Heats – May 18

Rank	Heat	Name	Nationality	Time	Notes
1	3	Oluwakemi Adekoya	Bahrain	51.46	Q
2	1	Salwa Eid Naser	Bahrain	51.94	Q
3	1	Yinka Ajayi	Nigeria	52.10	Q
4	3	Leni Shida	Uganda	53.70	Q
5	1	Djénébou Danté	Mali	54.18	q
6	2	Folashade Abugan	Nigeria	54.26	Q
7	2	Khadija Ouardi	Morocco	54.32	Q
8	2	Alita Moore	Guyana	55.36	q
9	3	Mariama Conteh	Sierra Leone	55.62	
10	1	Halimah Nakaayi	Uganda	55.77	
11	2	Büşra Yıldırım	Turkey	56.64	
12	3	Hanaa Al-Qassimi	Oman	1:00.83	SB
13	3	Aniqa Hashmi	Pakistan	1:02.22	
	1	Dana Hussain	Iraq	DQ	R162.5
	2	Alaa Hikmat	Iraq	DQ	R163.3b
	3	Elif Gören	Turkey	DQ	R162.7
	1	Assia Raziki	Morocco	DNF	

Final – May 19

Rank	Lane	Name	Nationality	Time	Notes
1st place, gold medalist(s)	4	Salwa Eid Naser	Bahrain	51.33	
2nd place, silver medalist(s)	5	Oluwakemi Adekoya	Bahrain	51.81	
3rd place, bronze medalist(s)	7	Yinka Ajayi	Nigeria	52.57	
4	2	Djénébou Danté	Mali	53.94	
5	8	Leni Shida	Uganda	54.57	
6	3	Alita Moore	Guyana	55.81	
	9	Khadija Ouardi	Morocco	DQ	R163.3b
	6	Folashade Abugan	Nigeria	DNF	

=== 800 metres ===
Heats – May 16

Rank	Heat	Name	Nationality	Time	Notes
1	1	Halimah Nakaayi	Uganda	2:02.97	Q
2	2	Malika Akkaoui	Morocco	2:04.37	Q
3	1	Manal El Bahraoui	Bahrain	2:05.43	Q
4	3	Noélie Yarigo	Benin	2:05.98	Q
5	3	Meryem Akdağ	Turkey	2:06.00	Q
6	3	Oumaima Saoud	Morocco	2:06.12	q
7	2	Marta Hirpato	Bahrain	2:06.80	Q
8	1	Arina Kleshchukova	Kyrgyzstan	2:06.83	q, SB
9	2	Anastasia Komarova	Azerbaijan	2:06.91	
10	2	Emine Hatun Tuna	Turkey	2:09.36	
11	3	Souhra Ali	Djibouti	2:11.02	NR
12	3	Gulshanoi Satarova	Kyrgyzstan	2:12.25	
13	1	Savinder Jogindr Singh	Malaysia	2:12.88	
14	1	Relaksa Dauti	Albania	2:14.74	
15	2	Mariama Conteh	Sierra Leone	2:14.97	
16	2	Rabia Ashiq	Pakistan	2:16.89	
17	1	Miznah Al-Nassar	Saudi Arabia	2:39.41	
18	3	Sandra Jalayta	Palestine	2:47.12	

Final – May 17

Rank	Name	Nationality	Time	Notes
1st place, gold medalist(s)	Malika Akkaoui	Morocco	2:01.04	
2nd place, silver medalist(s)	Halimah Nakaayi	Uganda	2:01.60	
3rd place, bronze medalist(s)	Noélie Yarigo	Benin	2:02.47	
4	Meryem Akdağ	Turkey	2:03.52	
5	Marta Hirpato	Bahrain	2:04.30	SB
6	Manal El Bahraoui	Bahrain	2:04.49	
7	Arina Kleshchukova	Kyrgyzstan	2:05.71	SB
	Oumaima Saoud	Morocco	DNS	

=== 1500 metres ===
May 19

Rank	Name	Nationality	Time	Notes
1st place, gold medalist(s)	Rababe Arafi	Morocco	4:18.82	
2nd place, silver medalist(s)	Meryem Akdağ	Turkey	4:19.91	
3rd place, bronze medalist(s)	Amina Bettiche	Algeria	4:21.29	
4	Tigist Gashaw	Bahrain	4:21.31	
5	Siham Hilali	Morocco	4:23.66	
6	Dalila Gosa	Bahrain	4:23.88	
7	Emine Hatun Tuna	Turkey	4:27.37	
8	Arina Kleshchukova	Kyrgyzstan	4:28.44	SB
9	Gulshanoi Satarova	Kyrgyzstan	4:30.07	
10	Sabad Elmi	Djibouti	4:40.60	
	Anastasia Komarova	Azerbaijan	DNF	
	Fatoumata Lamarana Sow	Guinea	DNS	

=== 5000 metres ===
May 18

Rank	Name	Nationality	Time	Notes
1st place, gold medalist(s)	Ruth Jebet	Bahrain	14:53.41	
2nd place, silver medalist(s)	Yasemin Can	Turkey	14:53.50	
3rd place, bronze medalist(s)	Daria Maslova	Kyrgyzstan	15:00.42	NR
4	Alia Saeed Mohammed	United Arab Emirates	15:00.45	NR
5	Bontu Rebitu	Bahrain	15:29.24	
6	Kaoutar Farkoussi	Morocco	15:55.72	SB
7	Büsra Nur Koku	Turkey	16:28.70	
8	Triyaningsih	Indonesia	17:57.52	
9	Ilsida Toemere	Suriname	22:01.87	
10	Amina Tahiri	Morocco	DNF	

=== 10,000 metres ===
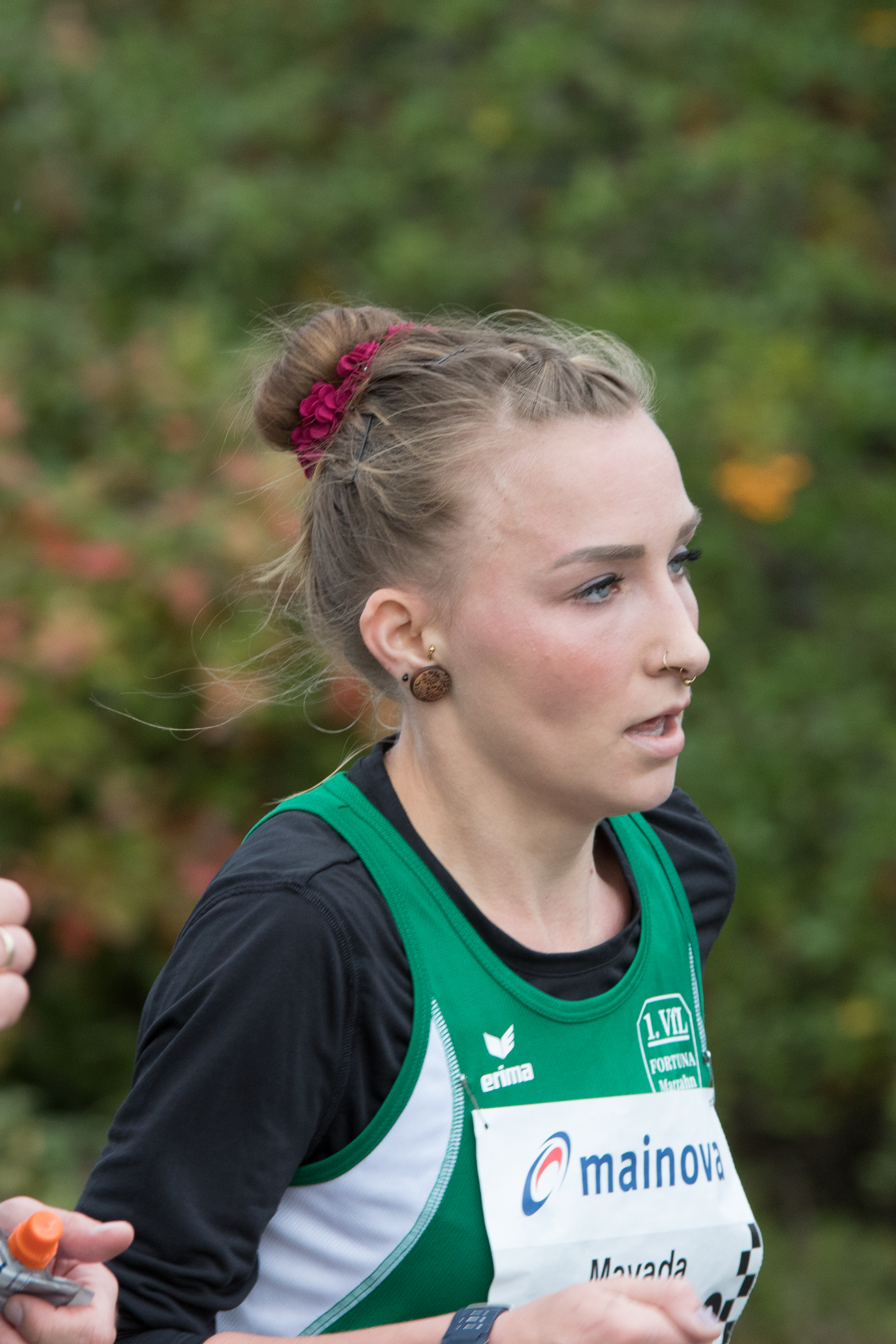
Mayada Al-Sayad

May 20

Rank	Name	Nationality	Time	Notes
1st place, gold medalist(s)	Yasemin Can	Turkey	31:18.20	
2nd place, silver medalist(s)	Rose Chelimo	Bahrain	31:37.81	
3rd place, bronze medalist(s)	Alia Saeed Mohammed	United Arab Emirates	31:49.01	SB
4	Shitaye Eshete	Bahrain	31:54.95	
5	Esma Aydemir	Turkey	32:57.57	
6	Viktoriia Poliudina	Kyrgyzstan	33:06.00	
7	Amina Tahiri	Morocco	34:01.98	
8	Mayada Sayyad	Palestine	36:20.46	
	Marina Khmelevskaya	Uzbekistan	DNF	

=== 100 metres hurdles ===
May 18
Wind: +1.0 m/s

Rank	Lane	Name	Nationality	Time	Notes
1st place, gold medalist(s)	7	Odile Ahouanwanou	Benin	13.55	PB
2nd place, silver medalist(s)	4	Nevin Yanıt Baltacı	Turkey	13.71	
3rd place, bronze medalist(s)	2	Raja Nursheena Raja Azhar	Malaysia	13.85	SB
4	5	Sanae Zouine	Morocco	14.02	
5	6	Mazoon Al-Alawi	Oman	14.60	
6	9	Dlsoz Najim	Iraq	14.86	NR
7	3	Maria Maratab	Pakistan	15.10	PB
8	8	Shamam Shwan	Iraq	18.81	

=== 400 metres hurdles ===
Heats – May 16

Rank	Heat	Name	Nationality	Time	Notes
1	1	Oluwakemi Adekoya	Bahrain	56.57	Q
2	2	Glory Onome Nathaniel	Nigeria	57.05	Q
3	2	Aminat Yusuf Jamal	Bahrain	57.48	Q
4	1	Elif Gören	Turkey	58.60	Q
5	1	Hayat Lambarki	Morocco	58.80	Q
6	1	Rita Ossai	Nigeria	59.02	q
7	2	Büşra Yıldırım	Turkey	1:02.46	Q
8	2	Najma Parveen	Pakistan	1:03.06	q, PB
9	1	Rokia Fofana	Burkina Faso	1:03.76	
10	1	Musarat Shaheen	Pakistan	1:05.35	PB
11	1	Shamam Shwan	Iraq	1:09.05	
12	2	Lidiya Salikhova	Azerbaijan	1:10.27	
	2	Dlsoz Najim	Iraq	DQ	R162.7
	2	Hanaa Al-Qassimi	Oman	DNF	

Final – May 17

Rank	Lane	Name	Nationality	Time	Notes
1st place, gold medalist(s)	5	Oluwakemi Adekoya	Bahrain	54.68	
2nd place, silver medalist(s)	6	Glory Onome Nathaniel	Nigeria	55.90	
3rd place, bronze medalist(s)	4	Aminat Yusuf Jamal	Bahrain	56.90	SB
4	7	Elif Gören	Turkey	57.58	
5	9	Rita Ossai	Nigeria	58.65	
6	2	Hayat Lambarki	Morocco	58.77	
7	3	Büşra Yıldırım	Turkey	59.92	
8	8	Najma Parveen	Pakistan	1:03.32	PB

=== 3000 metres steeplechase ===
May 17

Rank	Name	Nationality	Time	Notes
1st place, gold medalist(s)	Ruth Jebet	Bahrain	9:15.41	
2nd place, silver medalist(s)	Amina Bettiche	Algeria	9:25.90	PB
3rd place, bronze medalist(s)	Tigest Mekonin	Bahrain	9:26.00	SB
4	Tuğba Güvenç	Turkey	9:26.09	
5	Fadwa Sidi Madane	Morocco	9:29.64	SB
6	Özlem Kaya	Turkey	9:41.27	
	Oumaima Saoud	Morocco	DNS	

=== 4 × 100 metres relay ===
May 19

Rank	Lane	Nation	Competitors	Time	Notes
1st place, gold medalist(s)	4	Bahrain	Salwa Eid Naser, Iman Essa Jasim, Edidiong Odiong, Hajar Alkhaldi	44.98	
2nd place, silver medalist(s)	5	Nigeria	Glory Onome Nathaniel, Rita Ossai, Folasade Abigeal Abugan, Yinka Ajayi	46.20	
3rd place, bronze medalist(s)	8	Cameroon	Germaine Abessolo Bivina, Marie Gisele Eleme Asse, Char Abdoullahi Labarang, Marlyne Ngo Ngoa	46.78	
4	7	Azerbaijan	Nazan Azmammadli, Yelena Pekhtireva, Zakiyya Hasanova, Alyona Kheyrutdinova	46.98	
5	2	Iraq	Alaa Hikmat, Shamam Shwan, Pazhan Ahmed, Dlsoz Najim	48.62	
6	6	Pakistan	Sahibe Asra, Samra Shabbir, Najima Parveen, Maria Maratab	48.75	
	3	Turkey	Nevin Yanıt Baltacı, Nimet Karakuş, Elif Gören, Mizgin Ay	DNF	
	9	Morocco	Khadija Ouardi, Assia Raziki, Hayat Lambarki, Malika Akkaoui	DQ	R163.3b

=== 4 × 400 metres relay ===
May 20

Rank	Nation	Competitors	Time	Notes
1st place, gold medalist(s)	Bahrain	Salwa Eid Naser, Edidiong Odiong, Aminat Yusuf Jamal, Oluwakemi Adekoya	3:32.96	
2nd place, silver medalist(s)	Nigeria	Rita Ossai, Glory Onome Nathaniel, Folashade Abugan, Yinka Ajayi	3:34.47	
3rd place, bronze medalist(s)	Turkey	Mizgin Ay, Elif Yıldırım, Büşra Yıldırım, Meryem Akdağ	3:41.29	
4	Azerbaijan	Yelena Pekhtireva, Anastasia Komarova, Lidiya Salikhova, Zakiyya Hasanova	3:56.33	
5	Pakistan	Sahibe Asra, Rabia Ashiq, Aniqa Hashmi, Najima Parveen	4:03.31	
	Morocco	Khadija Ouardi, Hayat Lambarki, Rababe Arafi, Assia Raziki	DQ	R163.3b

=== High jump ===
May 18

Rank	Name	Nationality	1.55	1.60	1.65	1.70	1.74	1.77	1.80	Result	Notes
1st place, gold medalist(s)	Nadiya Dusanova	Uzbekistan	–	–	o	o	o	o	o	1.80	
2nd place, silver medalist(s)	Yousra Arar	Algeria	–	o	o	xxo	o	o	xxx	1.77	
3rd place, bronze medalist(s)	Natrena Hooper	Guyana	–	–	o	o	xxo	xxo	xxx	1.77	
4	Sibel Çınar	Turkey	–	–	–	o	o	xxx		1.74	
5	Pınar Aday	Turkey	–	–	o	o	xxx			1.70	
6	Sean Yee Yap	Malaysia	–	o	o	xo	xxx			1.70	
7	Sepideh Tavakoli Nik	Iran	–	–	o	xxx				1.65	
8	Aleksandra Biryukova	Azerbaijan	o	o	xo	xxx				1.65	
9	Ilona Salyamova	Azerbaijan	o	o	xo	xxx				1.65	
10	Rahaf Salama	Syria	o	o	xxo	xxx				1.65	

=== Pole vault ===
May 17

Rank	Name	Nationality	3.40	3.60	3.70	3.80	4.00	4.10	4.15	4.35	Result	Notes
1st place, gold medalist(s)	Buse Arıkazan	Turkey	–	–	–	o	o	–	o	xxx	4.15	
1st place, gold medalist(s)	Demet Parlak	Turkey	–	–	–	o	o	–	o	xxx	4.15	
3rd place, bronze medalist(s)	Syrine Balti	Tunisia	–	–	–	o	o	xx–	x		4.00	
4	Elena Gladkova	Azerbaijan	o	o	xo	xxx					3.70	

=== Long jump ===
May 18

Rank	Name	Nationality	#1	#2	#3	#4	#5	#6	Result	Notes
1st place, gold medalist(s)	Roumeissa Belabiod	Algeria	6.33	6.07	x	x	5.71	–	6.33	SB
2nd place, silver medalist(s)	Maria Natalia Londa	Indonesia	6.08	x	6.06	6.12	x	6.30	6.30	
3rd place, bronze medalist(s)	Marlyne Sarah Ngo Ngoa	Cameroon	5.80	5.97	x	5.68	6.06	5.83	6.06	
4	Sangone Kandji	Senegal	x	5.78	6.00	5.11	5.96	5.96	6.00	
5	Karin Melis Mey	Turkey	x	x	5.82	x	6.00	x	6.00	
6	Joëlle Mbumi Nkouindjin	Cameroon	x	5.53	5.78	5.88	5.81	5.56	5.88	
7	Yelena Pekhtireva	Azerbaijan	5.66	2.80	5.50	5.59	5.38	5.63	5.66	
8	Maria Maratab	Pakistan	x	5.31	4.87	5.17	5.30	5.16	5.31	
9	Yekaterina Sariyeva	Azerbaijan	x	x	5.27				5.27	
10	Monifah Djoe	Suriname	5.00	4.94	5.03				5.03	
	Sanae Zouine	Morocco	x	–	–				NM	
	Alida Sikder	Bangladesh							DNS	

=== Triple jump ===
May 16

Rank	Name	Nationality	#1	#2	#3	#4	#5	#6	Result	Notes
1st place, gold medalist(s)	Sangone Kandji	Senegal	13.05	12.88	12.85	12.86	12.87	x	13.05	
2nd place, silver medalist(s)	Joëlle Mbumi Nkouindjin	Cameroon	12.84	x	12.26	x	12.55	12.59	12.84	
3rd place, bronze medalist(s)	Yekaterina Sariyeva	Azerbaijan	x	x	12.39	12.81	11.97	12.60	12.81	
4	Cemre Bitgin	Turkey	x	12.63	12.07	12.47	12.13	12.43	12.63	
5	Monifah Djoe	Suriname	x	11.72	11.48	11.21	11.59	11.82	11.82	
6	Natrena Hooper	Guyana	x	11.63	11.74	11.69	11.54	11.78	11.78	

=== Shot put ===
May 16

Rank	Name	Nationality	#1	#2	#3	#4	#5	#6	Result	Notes
1st place, gold medalist(s)	Auriol Dongmo Mekemnang	Cameroon	15.74	16.72	17.75	x	17.75	17.51	17.75	SB
2nd place, silver medalist(s)	Emel Dereli	Turkey	17.59	x	17.62	x	x	17.27	17.62	
3rd place, bronze medalist(s)	Noora Salem Jasim	Bahrain	x	16.04	16.50	16.69	16.79	17.02	17.02	
4	Jessica Inchude	Guinea-Bissau	14.28	x	x	x	x	14.95	14.95	
5	Odile Ahouanwanou	Benin	14.79	x	14.16	x	13.89	14.76	14.79	
6	Hanna Skydan	Azerbaijan	x	13.61	13.95	x	x	13.98	13.98	
7	Hiba Omar	Syria	12.51	12.66	x	12.65	x	12.78	12.78	
8	Fatima Al-Hosani	United Arab Emirates	11.41	11.47	x	10.61	x	11.72	11.72	
9	Elçin Kaya	Turkey	10.05	–	–				10.05	

=== Discus throw ===
May 19

Rank	Name	Nationality	#1	#2	#3	#4	#5	#6	Result	Notes
1st place, gold medalist(s)	Jessica Inchude	Guinea-Bissau	50.23	x	47.34	x	46.37	45.17	50.23	
2nd place, silver medalist(s)	Noora Salem Jasim	Bahrain	x	37.14	45.48	x	41.99	50.12	50.12	SB
3rd place, bronze medalist(s)	Amina Moudden	Morocco	x	49.56	x	46.67	x	x	49.56	
4	Hanna Skydan	Azerbaijan	44.99	47.31	49.15	x	46.31	47.45	49.15	
5	Hiba Omar	Syria	x	47.84	46.77	x	47.29	48.27	48.27	PB
6	Elçin Kaya	Turkey	42.09	46.36	43.91	45.91	46.84	45.91	46.84	
7	Choo Kang Ni	Malaysia	38.17	44.52	40.56	44.01	42.13	42.73	44.52	
	Fatima Al-Hosani	United Arab Emirates	x	x	x				NM	
	Berivan Şakır	Turkey	x	x	–				NM	
	Wadad Robari	United Arab Emirates							DNS	

=== Hammer throw ===
May 16

Rank	Name	Nationality	Result	Notes
1st place, gold medalist(s)	Hanna Skydan	Azerbaijan	75.29	SB
2nd place, silver medalist(s)	Kıvılcım Kaya Salman	Turkey	67.41	
3rd place, bronze medalist(s)	Soukaina Zakkour	Morocco	63.10	NR
4	Tuğçe Şahutoğlu	Turkey	62.71	
5	Amineh Kashiri	Iran	51.31	
	Razia Sultana	Pakistan	DNS	

=== Javelin throw ===
May 18

Rank	Name	Nationality	#1	#2	#3	#4	#5	#6	Result	Notes
1st place, gold medalist(s)	Eda Tuğsuz	Turkey	67.21	x	–	–	–	–	67.21	SB
2nd place, silver medalist(s)	Sahar Ziaeisisakht	Iran	43.85	47.34	45.55	47.10	45.94	49.15	49.15	
3rd place, bronze medalist(s)	Berivan Şakır	Turkey	x	x	47.80	x	x	48.74	48.74	
4	Ragneta Zulfugarova	Azerbaijan	x	39.14	42.16	38.99	x	x	42.16	
5	Soukaina Zakkour	Morocco	35.22	x	36.39	38.58	39.99	x	39.99	
6	Fatima Hussain	Pakistan	37.75	37.17	34.71	x	34.68	36.55	37.75	
	Sepideh Tavakoly Nik	Iran	x	–	–	–	–	–	NM	
