= Marcelle Bouele Bondo =

Congolese sprinter (born 1993)

Cecilia Bouele
Personal information
- Nationality: Congolese
- Born: 7 January 1993 (age 33)
- Height: 1.66 m (5 ft 5 1/2 in)
- Weight: 60 kg (130 lb)

Sport
- Country: Republic of the Congo
- Sport: Athletics
- Event: 100 metres

Marcelle Cecilia Bouele Bondo (born 7 January 1993) is a Congolese sprinter who specializes in the 100 and 200 metres.

At the 2015 African Games she reached the semi-final of both 100 and 200 metres, and at the 2016 African Championships she also reached the semi-final of both 100 and 200 metres. She competed at the 2016 Summer Olympics in Rio de Janeiro advancing from the preliminary round to the heats where she was eliminated. At the 2017 Jeux de la Francophonie she only competed in the heats in both events.

In the 4 × 100 metres relay she finished eighth at the 2015 African Games and fourth at the 2017 Jeux de la Francophonie. Both results were Congolese records: 46.29 seconds from 2017 is still standing.

Her personal best times are 11.77 seconds, achieved at the 2016 African Championships in Durban; and 23.81 seconds in the 200 metres, achieved in May 2017 in Tergnier.
