= Loungo Matlhaku =

Botswana sprinter

Personal information
- Born: March 24, 1995 (age 31) Khakhea, Southern District, Botswana
- Height: 1.56 m (5 ft 1 in)
- Weight: 58 kg (128 lb)

Sport
- Sport: Athletics
- Event: 200 metres
Medal record
Women's athletics
Representing Botswana
African Championships
Bronze medal – third place	2014 Marrakesh	4×400 m

Loungo Matlhaku (born 24 March 1995) is a Botswana sprinter who competes primarily in the 200 metres. She won a bronze medal in the 4 × 400 metres relay at the 2018 Commonwealth Games. Additionally, she won several medals at regional level.

== International competitions ==
Year	Competition	Venue	Position	Event	Notes
Representing Botswana
2011	African Junior Championships	Gaborone, Botswana	2nd	100 m	12.01
2011	African Junior Championships	Gaborone, Botswana	8th	200 m	25.98
2011	African Junior Championships	Gaborone, Botswana	3rd	4 × 100 m relay	48.46
2011	World Youth Championships	Lille, France	33rd (h)	100 m	12.35
2011	World Youth Championships	Lille, France	19th (sf)	200 m	24.71
2011	Commonwealth Youth Games	Douglas, Isle of Man	4th	100 m	12.03 (w)
2011	Commonwealth Youth Games	Douglas, Isle of Man	5th	200 m	24.82 (w)
2013	African Junior Championships	Bambous, Mauritius	3rd	200 m	24.62
2014	World Junior Championships	Eugene, United States	43rd (h)	100 m	12.12
2014	World Junior Championships	Eugene, United States	26th (h)	200 m	24.39 (w)
2014	African Championships	Marrakesh, Morocco	15th (sf)	200 m	24.70
2014	African Championships	Marrakesh, Morocco	3rd	4 × 400 m relay	3:40.28
2015	IAAF World Relays	Nassau, Bahamas	5th (B)	4 × 400 m relay	3:35.76
2016	African Championships	Durban, South Africa	8th	100 m	11.67
2016	African Championships	Durban, South Africa	7th	200 m	24.18
2016	African Championships	Durban, South Africa	5th	4 × 100 m relay	46.10
2018	Commonwealth Games	Gold Coast, Australia	20th (sf)	200 m	23.98
2018	Commonwealth Games	Gold Coast, Australia	3rd	4 × 400 m relay	3:26.86
2018	African Championships	Asaba, Nigeria	19th (h)	100 m	12.08
2018	African Championships	Asaba, Nigeria	4th	4 × 400 m relay	3:42.16
2019	Universiade	Naples, Italy	11th (sf)	100 m	11.63
2019	African Games	Rabat, Morocco	7th	200 m	23.84
2021	World Relays	Chorzów, Poland	11th (h)	4 × 400 m relay	3:34.99
2022	African Championships	Port Louis, Mauritius	11th (sf)	100 m	11.59
2022	African Championships	Port Louis, Mauritius	18th (h)	200 m	24.19
2022	African Championships	Port Louis, Mauritius	5th	4 × 100 m relay	45.93

== Personal bests ==
Outdoor

- 100 metres – 11.55 (-0.5 m/s, Johannesburg 2018)
- 200 metres – 23.25 (+0.1 m/s, Gaborone 2016)
- 400 metres – 55.88 (Brisbane 2018)
