= Phumlile Ndzinisa =

Swazi sprinter

Personal information
- Born: August 21, 1992 (age 33) Lobamba, Swaziland
- Height: 1.70 m (5 ft 7 in)

Sport
- Country: Eswatini
- Sport: Athletics
- Event(s): 100 m, 200 m, 400 m

Phumlile Sibonakele Ndzinisa (born 21 August 1992) is a Swazi sprinter. A national record holder in multiple events, her main achievements were top-8 placement in four events at African continental championships.

She was born in Lobamba, Hhohho District. For her first international competition, she borrowed running shoes. While still a teenager she competed at the 2009 World Youth Championships, the 2010 African Championships, the 2011 World Championships and the 2011 All-Africa Games (both 200 and 400 metres) without reaching the final. She finished sixth in the 200 metres and seventh in the 400 metres at the 2011 African Junior Championships.

In the run-up to the 2012 Olympic Games, Phumlile Ndzinisa competed in the South African championships and then in the 2012 African Championships (both 200 and 400 metres). She was then invited together with Sibusiso Matsenjwa to a lengthy stay in England, residing at the Kelly College to train in Tavistock. At the 2012 Summer Olympics 400 metres event, she was eliminated in the first round, but broke the national record with 53.95 seconds. She followed with her first international medals in 2013; gold in the 200 and silver in the 400 metres at the African Southern Region Athletics Championships.

She competed at the 2013 World Championships and the 2014 Commonwealth Games (both 200 and 400 metres) without reaching the final, but finished eighth in both 200 and 400 metres at the 2014 African Championships. She continued with a sixth place in the 200 metres at the 2015 African Games, but was knocked out in the semi-final of the 400 metres. At the 2016 African Championships she achieved a sixth place in the 100 metres, but did not finish the 200 metres semi-final. She bowed out in the preliminary round at her second Olympic Games. She was the flag bearer for Swaziland during the closing ceremony.

After largely missing the 2017 season, Ndzinisa competed at the 2018 Commonwealth Games, the 2018 African Championships (100 and 200 metres) and the 2019 African Games (100 and 200 metres). Competing in 2020 and 2021, she was hoping to reach her third Olympic Games, but was not selected due to injury – and as such the results were outside of the world top 1000.

Her personal best times are all Swazi records; 11.35 seconds in the 100 metres, achieved in May 2016 in Forbach; 23.47 seconds in the 200 and 53.02 seconds in the 400 metres, both achieved at the 2015 African Games in Brazzaville.
