= Élodie Embony =

Malagasy sprinter

Personal information
- Born: 22 October 1987 (age 38)

Sport
- Sport: Athletics
- Events: 100 m, 200 m

Élodie Vanessa Embony (born 22 October 1987) is a Malagasy athlete competing in sprinting events. She represented her country at the 2016 World Indoor Championships without advancing from the first round.

== Competition record ==
| Year | Competition | Venue | Position | Event | Notes |
Representing Madagascar
| 2011 | All-Africa Games | Maputo, Mozambique | 21st (h) | 200 m | 25.94 |
| 2014 | African Championships | Marrakesh, Morocco | 16th (sf) | 100 m | 12.32 |
| 2015 | African Games | Brazzaville, Republic of the Congo | 12th (sf) | 100 m | 11.94 |
| 2015 | African Games | Brazzaville, Republic of the Congo | 16th (sf) | 200 m | 24.37 |
| 2016 | World Indoor Championships | Portland, United States | 37th (h) | 60 m | 7.65 |

== Personal bests ==
Outdoor

- 100 metres – 11.76 (-0.1 m/s, Saint-Paul, Réunion 2015)
- 200 metres – 24.22 (+0.8 m/s, Brazzaville 2015)

Indoor

- 60 metres – 7.65 (Portland 2016)
