= Athletics at the 2018 Commonwealth Games – Women's 200 metres =

Women's 200 metres at the 2018 Commonwealth Games
- Venue: Carrara Stadium
- Dates: 10 April (heats); 11 April (semifinals); 12 April (final)
- Competitors: 38 from 21 nations
- Winning time: 22.09 GR

Medalists
gold medal	Shaunae Miller-Uibo	Bahamas
silver medal	Shericka Jackson	Jamaica
bronze medal	Dina Asher-Smith	England

The women's 200 metres at the 2018 Commonwealth Games, as part of the athletics programme, took place in the Carrara Stadium between 10 and 12 April 2018.

== Records ==
Prior to this competition, the existing world and Games records were as follows:

World record	Florence Griffith Joyner (USA)	21.34	Seoul, South Korea	29 September 1988
Games record	Debbie Ferguson (BAH)	22.20	Manchester, England	29 July 2002

== Schedule ==
The schedule was as follows:

Date	Time	Round
Tuesday 10 April 2018	12:20	First round
Wednesday 11 April 2018	20:10	Semifinals
Thursday 12 April 2018	21:38	Final

All times are Australian Eastern Standard Time (UTC+10)

== Results ==
=== First round ===
The first round consisted of five heats. The four fastest competitors per heat (plus four fastest losers) advanced to the semifinals.

Heat 1

Rank	Lane	Name	Reaction Time	Result	Notes	Qual.
1	8	Crystal Emmanuel (CAN)	0.165	22.72		Q
2	6	Shashalee Forbes (JAM)	0.155	22.88	SB	Q
3	7	Semoy Hackett (TTO)	0.142	23.37		Q
4	3	Praise Idamadudu (NGR)	0.162	23.55	SB	Q
5	2	Afure Adah (PNG)	0.173	24.54		
6	4	Gladys Musyoki (KEN)	0.194	24.94		
7	5	Mariatu Koroma (SLE)	0.183	25.59		
8	1	Shirin Akter (BAN)	0.210	26.17		
				Wind: -0.9 m/s		

Heat 2

Rank	Lane	Name	Reaction Time	Result	Notes	Qual.
1	3	Dina Asher-Smith (ENG)	0.149	23.28		Q
2	8	Rumeshika Rathnayake (SRI)	0.149	23.43		Q
3	2	Maddie Coates (AUS)	0.150	23.51		Q
4	7	Anthonique Strachan (BAH)	0.160	23.52		Q
5	4	Hafsatu Kamara (SLE)	0.144	24.50		
6	5	T-Kailah Richardson (AIA)	0.160	25.61		
–	6	Charifa Abdoullahi Labarang (CMR)		DNS		
				Wind: +0.3 m/s		

Heat 3

Rank	Lane	Name	Reaction Time	Result	Notes	Qual.
1	5	Shaunae Miller-Uibo (BAH)	0.167	22.95		Q
2	7	Janet Amponsah (GHA)	0.238	23.66		Q
3	3	Riley Day (AUS)	0.163	23.71		Q
4	6	Amy Foster (NIR)	0.141	23.94		Q
5	8	Millicent Ndoro (KEN)	0.189	24.31	SB	q
6	2	Irene Bell Borong (CMR)	0.149	24.56		
7	4	Ola Buwaro (GAM)	0.137	24.66		
				Wind: -1.9 m/s		

Heat 4

Rank	Lane	Name	Reaction Time	Result	Notes	Qual.
1	5	Elaine Thompson (JAM)	0.168	23.09		Q
2	7	Finette Agyapong (ENG)	0.118	23.15		Q
3	8	Gina Bass (GAM)	0.171	23.24		Q
4	6	Kai Selvon (TTO)	0.177	23.33		Q
5	4	Loungo Matlhaku (BOT)	0.165	24.05		q
6	3	Charlotte Wingfield (MLT)	0.159	24.40		
7	2	Joan Cherono (KEN)	0.172	25.10		
–	1	Tynia Gaither (BAH)		DNS		
				Wind: -0.1 m/s		

Heat 5

Rank	Lane	Name	Reaction Time	Result	Notes	Qual.
1	4	Shericka Jackson (JAM)	0.173	22.87		Q
2	3	Bianca Williams (ENG)	0.111	23.20		Q
3	8	Kamaria Durant (TTO)	0.161	23.33		Q
4	1	Isoken Igbinosun (NGR)	0.153	23.54		Q
5	2	Larissa Pasternatsky (AUS)	0.151	23.55		q
6	6	Germaine Abessolo Bivina (CMR)	0.188	23.77	PB	q
7	5	Patricia Taea (COK)	0.147	24.91		
8	7	Najma Parveen (PAK)	0.163	25.21	PB	
				Wind: -0.4 m/s		

=== Semifinals ===
Three semi-finals were held. The two fastest competitors per semi (plus two fastest losers) advanced to the final.

Semifinal 1

Rank	Lane	Name	Reaction Time	Result	Notes	Qual.
1	6	Shericka Jackson (JAM)	0.152	22.28	PB	Q
2	5	Dina Asher-Smith (ENG)	0.145	22.44		Q
3	7	Semoy Hackett (TTO)	0.155	22.97		q
4	8	Maddie Coates (AUS)	0.152	23.43		
5	4	Gina Bass (GAM)	0.151	23.60		
6	3	Rumeshika Rathnayake (SRI)	0.143	23.60		
7	2	Loungo Matlhaku (BOT)	0.165	23.98		
8	1	Amy Foster (NIR)	0.130	24.02		
				Wind: +0.1 m/s		

Semifinal 2

Rank	Lane	Name	Reaction Time	Result	Notes	Qual.
1	6	Shaunae Miller-Uibo (BAH)	0.136	22.48		Q
2	5	Elaine Thompson (JAM)	0.154	22.95		Q
3	4	Bianca Williams (ENG)	0.152	23.23		q
4	7	Riley Day (AUS)	0.150	23.24		
5	8	Kai Selvon (TTO)	0.197	23.42		
6	3	Janet Amponsah (GHA)	0.149	23.67		
7	2	Praise Idamadudu (NGR)	0.152	23.69		
8	1	Germaine Abessolo Bivina (CMR)	0.166	24.05		
				Wind: -0.3 m/s		

Semifinal 3

Rank	Lane	Name	Reaction Time	Result	Notes	Qual.
1	3	Crystal Emmanuel (CAN)	0.142	22.87		Q
2	4	Shashalee Forbes (JAM)	0.137	22.93		Q
3	6	Finette Agyapong (ENG)	0.131	23.38		
4	8	Anthonique Strachan (BAH)	0.152	23.62		
5	2	Larissa Pasternatsky (AUS)	0.148	23.64		
6	5	Kamaria Durant (TTO)	0.149	23.83		
7	7	Isoken Igbinosun (NGR)	0.170	24.03		
8	1	Millicent Ndoro (KEN)	0.154	24.42		
				Wind: 0.0 m/s		

=== Final ===
The medals were determined in the final.

Rank	Lane	Name	Reaction Time	Result	Notes
1st place, gold medalist(s)	3	Shaunae Miller-Uibo (BAH)	0.140	22.09	GR
2nd place, silver medalist(s)	4	Shericka Jackson (JAM)	0.157	22.18	PB
3rd place, bronze medalist(s)	6	Dina Asher-Smith (ENG)	0.144	22.29	
4	7	Elaine Thompson (JAM)	0.171	22.30	
5	5	Crystal Emmanuel (CAN)	0.156	22.70	
6	2	Bianca Williams (ENG)	0.173	23.06	
7	1	Semoy Hackett (TTO)	0.147	23.16	
–	8	Shashalee Forbes (JAM)	0.145	DQ	R 163.3a
				Wind: +0.9 m/s	
