= Salim Abu Mayanja =

Ugandan middle-distance runner

Personal information
- Nationality: Uganda
- Born: 9 October 1995 (age 30)

Sport
- Sport: Athletics
- Events: 800 metres, 1500 metres

Salim Abu Mayanja (born 9 October 1995) is a Ugandan runner who specializes in the 800 and 1500 metres.

He finished sixth at the 2017 Islamic Solidarity Games. He also competed in the 800 metres at the 2017 World Championships and the 2019 African Games without reaching the final. In 2023, he competed in the 1500 metres at the World Championships.

His personal best times are 1:45.73 minutes, achieved in July 2017 in Kampala; and 3:34.51 minutes in the 1500 metres, achieved in July 2019 in Poznan.
