= Germaine Abessolo Bivina =

Cameroonian sprinter

Personal information
- Born: 9 May 1990 (age 36) Zoétélé, Cameroon
- Education: University of Yaoundé II
- Height: 1.65 m (5 ft 5 in)
- Weight: 53 kg (117 lb)

Sport
- Sport: Athletics
- Events: 100 m, 200 m
Medal record
Women's athletics
Representing Cameroon
African Championships
Silver medal – second place	2018 Asaba	200 m

Germaine Abessolo Bivina (born 9 May 1990) is a Cameroonian sprinter. She won a silver medal in the 4 × 100 metres relay at the 2017 Jeux de la Francophonie and a bronze at the 2017 Islamic Solidarity Games.

== International competitions ==
Year	Competition	Venue	Position	Event	Notes
Representing Cameroon
2014	African Championships	Marrakesh, Morocco	25th (h)	200 m	25.35
2014	African Championships	Marrakesh, Morocco	5th	4 × 100 m relay	46.33
2015	Universiade	Gwangju, South Korea	26th (h)	100 m	12.18
2015	Universiade	Gwangju, South Korea	26th (h)	200 m	25.01
2015	African Games	Brazzaville, Republic of the Congo	16th (sf)	100 m	12.03
2015	African Games	Brazzaville, Republic of the Congo	18th (sf)	200 m	24.40
2015	African Games	Brazzaville, Republic of the Congo	6th	4 × 100 m relay	45.27
2015	African Games	Brazzaville, Republic of the Congo	–	4 × 400 m relay	DQ
2016	African Championships	Durban, South Africa	16th (sf)	100 m	11.96
2016	African Championships	Durban, South Africa	15th (sf)	200 m	24.42
2016	African Championships	Durban, South Africa	6th	4 × 100 m relay	46.23
2017	Islamic Solidarity Games	Baku, Azerbaijan	7th	200 m	24.44
2017	Islamic Solidarity Games	Baku, Azerbaijan	3rd	4 × 100 m relay	46.78
2017	Jeux de la Francophonie	Abidjan, Ivory Coast	6th	200 m	24.36
2017	Jeux de la Francophonie	Abidjan, Ivory Coast	2nd	4 × 100 m relay	45.23
2017	Universiade	Taipei, Taiwan	31st (qf)	100 m	12.11
2017	Universiade	Taipei, Taiwan	19th (sf)	200 m	24.46
2018	Commonwealth Games	Gold Coast, Australia	23rd (sf)	200 m	24.05
2018	Commonwealth Games	Gold Coast, Australia	6th	4 × 100 m relay	45.24
2018	African Championships	Asaba, Nigeria	16th (sf)	100 m	12.10
2018	African Championships	Asaba, Nigeria	2nd	200 m	23.36

== Personal bests ==
Outdoor

- 100 metres – 11.55 (+0.1 m/s, Durban 2016)
- 200 metres – 23.36 (-1.0 m/s, Asaba 2018)
