= Dorcas Gyimah =

Ghanaian sprinter

Personal information
- Born: 2 February 1992 (age 33) Ghana
- Education: Dorcas Gyimah attained her West African Senior Secondary Certificate Examination at Konongo Odumase Secondary School in Ashanti Region, Ghana

Sport
- Sport: Athletics
- Event(s): 100 m, 200 m

Dorcas Gyimah (born 2 February 1992) is a Ghanaian sprinter specialising in the 100 metres and 200 metres. She represented Ghana in the 200 metres at the 2015 African Games.

Gyimah was selected to represent Ghana in the 4 × 100 metres relay at the 2016 Summer Olympics in Rio de Janeiro, Brazil. Gyimah was not selected to run in the heat and the team did not advance to the final.

== Competition record ==
Year	Competition	Venue	Position	Event	Notes
Representing Ghana
2015	African Games	Brazzaville, Republic of the Congo	20th	200 m	24.34
