= Andrew Fisher (sprinter) =

Bahraini sprinter (born 1991)

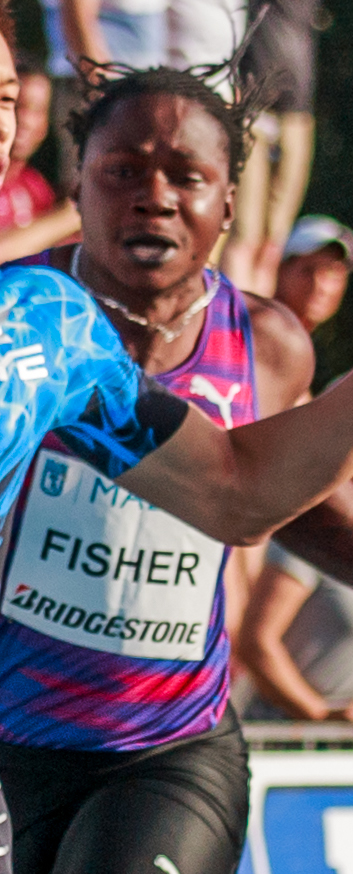
- Andrew Fisher in 2017

Personal information
- Born: December 15, 1991 (age 34) Jamaica

Sport
- Country: Bahrain
- Sport: Athletics
- Event: 100 metres
Medal record
Representing Jamaica
CAC Championships
Gold medal – first place	2013 Morelia	100 m
Silver medal – second place	2013 Morelia	4×100 m relay
Representing Bahrain
Islamic Solidarity Games
Gold medal – first place	2017 Baku	4×100 m relay
Silver medal – second place	2017 Baku	100 m
Arab Championships
Silver medal – second place	2019 Cairo	100m
Silver medal – second place	2019 Cairo	4×100 m relay

Andrew Fisher (born 15 December 1991) is a Bahraini sprinter, who represented Jamaica until 2015.

At the 2013 Central American and Caribbean Championships he won a gold medal in the 100 metres, with a personal best of 10.07 s in the heats. On July 11, 2015, during the meeting of Madrid, he ran his new best of 9.94. Representing Bahrain, he ran 10.07 in Kingston on May 7, 2016.

He competed at the 2016 Summer Olympics, but was disqualified from the 100 meter sprint during Heat 2 of the Semifinals due to a false start.
