= Marie Gisèle Eleme Asse =

Cameroonian sprinter (born 1995)

Personal information
- Born: 13 November 1995 (age 30) Yaoundé, Cameroon

Sport
- Sport: Athletics
- Events: 100 m, 200 m

Marie Gisèle Eleme Asse (born 13 November 1995) is a Cameroonian sprinter She won two medals at the 2017 Jeux de la Francophonie.

== International competitions ==
Year	Competition	Venue	Position	Event	Notes
Representing the Cameroon
2011	World Youth Championships	Lille, France	19th (h)	200 m	25.02^{1}
2012	World Junior Championships	Barcelona, Spain	44th (h)	200 m	25.12
2015	African Games	Brazzaville, Republic of the Congo	9th (sf)	100 m	11.77
2015	African Games	Brazzaville, Republic of the Congo	16th (sf)	200 m	24.37
2015	African Games	Brazzaville, Republic of the Congo	6th	4 × 100 m relay	45.27
2016	African Championships	Durban, South Africa	14th (sf)	100 m	11.85
2016	African Championships	Durban, South Africa	6th	4 × 100 m relay	46.23
2017	Islamic Solidarity Games	Baku, Azerbaijan	8th	100 m	11.99
2017	Islamic Solidarity Games	Baku, Azerbaijan	3rd	4 × 100 m relay	46.78
2017	Jeux de la Francophonie	Abidjan, Ivory Coast	2nd	100 m	11.59
2017	Jeux de la Francophonie	Abidjan, Ivory Coast	2nd	4 × 100 m relay	45.23
2018	Commonwealth Games	Gold Coast, Australia	25th (h)	100 m	11.88
2018	Commonwealth Games	Gold Coast, Australia	6th	4 × 100 m relay	45.24

^{1}Did not start in the semifinals

== Personal bests ==
Outdoor

- 100 metres – 11.59 (-0.8 m/s, Abidjan 2017)
- 200 metres – 24.28 (+0.8 m/s, Brazzaville 2015)
