= Prenam Pesse =

Togolese sprinter

Personal information
- Born: 31 December 1997 (age 28)

Sport
- Sport: Track and field
- Event: 100 metres

Prenam Pesse (born 31 December 1997) is a Togolese sprinter who specializes in the 200 metres.

Her biggest success is reaching the semi-final at the 2017 Islamic Solidarity Games. She also competed at the 2012 African Championships (200 m), the 2015 African Games (100 and 200 metres, the 2016 African Championships (100 and 200 metres, the 2016 Summer Olympics (100 m), where she ranked 4th in her heat with a time of 12.38 seconds, the 2017 Islamic Solidarity Games (100 m) and the 2017 Jeux de la Francophonie (100 and 200 metres) without reaching the final. In 2019, she represented Togo at the 2019 African Games held in Rabat, Morocco. She competed in the women's 100 metres.

Her personal best times are 12.08 seconds in the 100 metres, achieved in April 2014 in Abidjan; and 24.90 seconds in the 200 metres, achieved at the 2017 Islamic Solidarity Games in Baku.
