= Cecilia Francis =

Nigerian sprinter (born 1996)

Personal information
- Nationality: Nigeria
- Born: 17 September 1996 (age 29) Lagos State, Nigeria

Sport
- Country: Nigeria
- Sport: Athletics
- Sprint: 100m 4x100m

Achievements and titles
- Personal best: 100 m: 11.76 s (2015)
Medal record
Women's Athletics
Representing Nigeria
All-Africa Games
Gold medal – first place	2015 Brazzaville	4x100m relay

Cecilia Francis (born 17 September 1996) is a Nigerian sprinter who specializes in the 100 metres and 4 x 100 metres relay. Cecilia claimed gold alongside Blessing Okagbare, Lawretta Ozoh and Ngozi Onwumere in the 4 x 100 metres relay at the 2015 All-Africa Games in Brazzaville, Congo. She also represented Nigeria at the 2015 World Championships in Athletics in Beijing, China.

== Doping case ==
Francis tested positive for the anabolic steroid metenolone at the 2013 African Youth Athletics Championships, as a 16-year old. She was given a one-year ban from sports after she cooperated with the authorities in an investigation. Athletics Federation of Nigeria banned her coach Abass Rauf for life, and Lee Evans got a four-year ban.
