= Ali Messaoudi =

Algerian steeplechase runner

Messaoudi
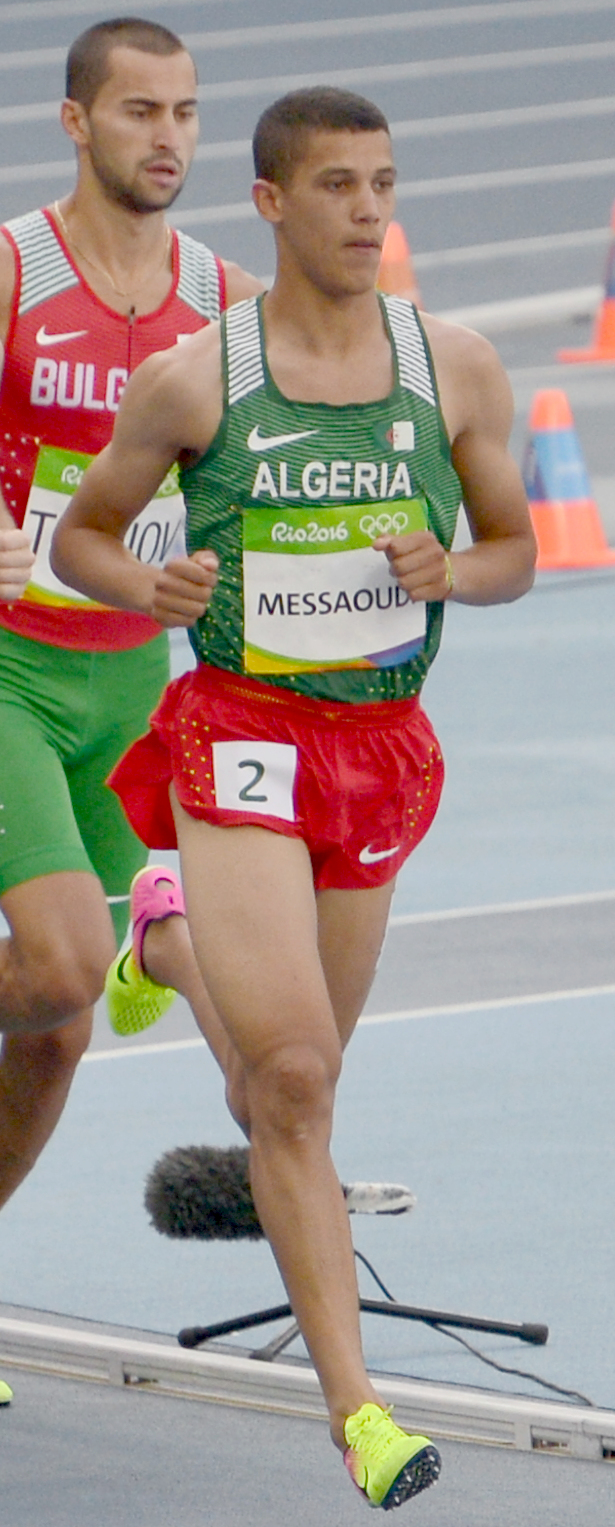
- Messaoudi at the 2016 Olympics

Personal information
- Born: 13 October 1995 (age 30)
- Height: 180 cm (5 ft 11 in)
- Weight: 65 kg (143 lb)

Sport
- Country: Algéria
- Sport: Athletics
- Event: Steeplechase and 1500m
- Club: Groupe pétrolier sonatrach (GSP)
- Coached by: ....

Achievements and titles
- Personal best: 3000 mS – 8:27.99 (2016)

Ali Messaoudi (born 13 October 1995) is an Algerian steeplechase runner. He was a finalist at the world junior championships in Eugene 2014. In 2016, he became the U23 Mediterranean champion in Tunisia. He competed in the 2016 Summer Olympics, but was disqualified in the heats. In 2017, he participated in the French cross country championships, third(3) place. That same year, he also competed in the 29th summer universiade in Taipei where he got third(3) place in the final.
