= List of English records in athletics =

English records in athletics are the best performances in athletics events by athletes representing England which are ratified by England Athletics (EA), or formerly the Amateur Athletic Association of England (AAA).

== Key to tables ==
Awaiting ratification Record not kept by EA Not ratified or later rescinded by EA

Performances marked with an asterisk (*) maybe a) not ratifiable or b) currently under further review
! = timing by photo-electric cell
est = estimate

== Outdoor ==
=== Men ===
Event	Record	Athlete	Date	Meet	Place	Ref.
100 m	9.83 (+1.3 m/s)	Zharnel Hughes	24 June 2023	USATF New York Grand Prix	New York City, United States	
150 m (straight)	14.66 (+0.3 m/s)	Zharnel Hughes	18 May 2024	Atlanta City Games	Atlanta, United States	
200 m	19.73 (+1.6 m/s)	Zharnel Hughes	23 July 2023	Anniversary Games	London, United Kingdom	
400 m	44.35	Matthew Hudson-Smith	28 May 2022	Prefontaine Classic	Eugene, United States	
800 m	1:41.73	Sebastian Coe	10 June 1981		Florence, Italy	
1500 m	3:28.81	Mo Farah	19 July 2013	Herculis	Fontvieille, Monaco	
Mile (road)	3:51.3 h	Elliot Giles	1 September 2024	New Balance Kö Meile	Düsseldorf, Germany	
3000 m	7:32.62	Mo Farah	5 June 2016	British Grand Prix	Birmingham, United Kingdom	
5000 m	12:53.11	Mo Farah	22 July 2011	Herculis	Fontvieille, Monaco	
5 km	13:20	Marc Scott	8 August 2020	Podium 5k	Barrowford, United Kingdom	
10,000 m	26:46.57	Mo Farah	3 June 2011	Prefontaine Classic	Eugene, United States	
10 km	27:38	Rory Leonard	12 January 2025	10K Valencia Ibercaja	Valencia, Spain	
20,000 m	56:20.30+	Mo Farah	4 September 2020	Memorial van Damme	Brussels, Belgium	
Half marathon	59:32	Mo Farah	22 March 2015	Lisbon Half Marathon	Lisbon, Portugal	
One hour	21,330 m	Mo Farah	4 September 2020	Memorial van Damme	Brussels, Belgium	
25 km	1:12:36+	Mo Farah	22 April 2018	London Marathon	London, United Kingdom	
30 km	1:27:31+	Mo Farah	22 April 2018	London Marathon	London, United Kingdom	
Marathon	2:05:11	Mo Farah	7 October 2018	Chicago Marathon	Chicago, United States	
110 m hurdles	13.00	Tony Jarrett	20 August 1993	World Championships	Stuttgart, Germany	
400 m hurdles	47.82	Kriss Akabusi	6 August 1992	Olympic Games	Barcelona, Spain	
3000 m steeplechase	8:07.96	Mark Rowland	30 September 1988	Olympic Games	Seoul, South Korea	
High jump	2.37 m	Steve Smith	20 September 1992	1992 World Junior Championships	Seoul, South Korea	
High jump	2.37 m	Steve Smith	22 August 1993	World Championships	Stuttgart, Germany	
High jump	2.37 m	Robbie Grabarz	23 August 2012	Athletissima	Lausanne, Switzerland	
Pole vault	5.82 m	Steven Lewis	21 July 2012	Janusz Kusociński Memorial	Szczecin, Poland	
Long jump	8.51 m (+1.7 m/s)	Greg Rutherford	24 April 2014		Chula Vista, United States	
Triple jump	18.29 m (+1.3 m/s)	Jonathan Edwards	7 August 1995	World Championships	Gothenburg, Sweden	
Shot put	21.68 m	Geoff Capes	18 May 1980		Cwmbran, United Kingdom	
Discus throw	70.76 m	Lawrence Okoye	13 April 2025	Oklahoma Throws Series World Invitational	Ramona, United States	
Hammer throw	80.26 m	Nick Miller	8 April 2018	Commonwealth Games	Gold Coast, Australia	
Javelin throw	91.46 m	Steve Backley	25 January 1992		Auckland, New Zealand	
Decathlon	8847 pts	Daley Thompson	8–9 August 1984	Olympic Games	Los Angeles, United States	
Decathlon	100m (wind) / Long jump (wind) / Shot put / High jump / 400m / 110m H (wind) / Discus / Pole vault / Javelin / 1500m; 10.44 / 8.01 m / 15.72 m / 2.03 m / 46.97 / 14.33 / 46.56 m / 5.00 m / 65.24 m / 4:35.00					
3000 m walk (track)	11:24.4	Mark Easton	10 May 1989		Tonbridge, United Kingdom	
5000 m walk (track)	18:43.28	Tom Bosworth	2 July 2017	British Championships	Birmingham, United Kingdom	
10,000 m walk (track)	40:06.65	Ian McCombie	4 June 1989		Jarrow, United Kingdom	
10 km walk (road)	39:36	Tom Bosworth	1 March 2015		Coventry, United Kingdom	
20 km walk (road)	1:19:38	Tom Bosworth	8 April 2018	Commonwealth Games	Gold Coast, Australia	
4 × 100 m relay	38.02	England; Adam Gemili; Harry Aikines-Aryeetey; Richard Kilty; Danny Talbot	2 August 2014	Commonwealth Games	Glasgow, United Kingdom	
4 × 400 m relay	3:00.40	England; Jared Deacon; Sean Baldock; Chris Rawlinson; Daniel Caines	31 July 2002	Commonwealth Games	Manchester, United Kingdom	

=== Women ===
Event	Record	Athlete	Date	Meet	Place	Ref.
100 m	10.83 (+0.8 m/s)	Dina Asher-Smith	17 July 2022	World Championships	Eugene, United States	
150 m (bend)	16.42+ (−0.4 m/s)	Dina Asher-Smith	28 August 2025	Weltklasse Zürich	Zurich, Switzerland	
150 m (straight)	16.44 (±0.0 m/s)	Daryll Neita	18 May 2024	Atlanta City Games	Atlanta, United States	
200 m	21.89 (+0.2 m/s)	Dina Asher-Smith	11 August 2018	European Championships	Berlin, Germany	
400 m	49.41	Christine Ohuruogu	12 August 2013	World Championships	Moscow, Russia	
800 m	1:54.33	Keely Hodgkinson	7 June 2026	Bauhausgalan	Stockholm, Sweden	
1500 m	3:57.90	Kelly Holmes	28 August 2004	Olympic Games	Athens, Greece	
2000 m	5:35.87	Revée Walcott-Nolan	19 February 2026	Meeting Hauts-de-France Pas-de-Calais	Liévin, France	
3000 m	8:26.97	Paula Radcliffe	29 June 2001		Rome, Italy	
3000 m	8:22.20	Paula Radcliffe	19 July 2002	Herculis	Fontvieille, Monaco	
5000 m	14:29.11	Paula Radcliffe	20 June 2004	European Cup	Bydgoszcz, Poland	
10,000 m	30:01.09	Paula Radcliffe	6 August 2002		Munich, Germany	
10 km	30:21	Paula Radcliffe	23 February 2003		San Juan, Puerto Rico	
Half marathon	1:06:47	Paula Radcliffe	7 October 2001	World Half Marathon Championships	Bristol, United Kingdom	
Half marathon	1:05:39.6 a	Paula Radcliffe	21 September 2003		Newcastle–South Shields, United Kingdom	
Marathon	2:15:25	Paula Radcliffe	13 April 2003	London Marathon	London, United Kingdom	
24 hours	278.622 km	Sarah Webster	19 October 2025	IAU 24 Hour World Championship	Albi, France	
100 m hurdles	12.51 (+0.7 m/s)	Tiffany Porter	14 September 2014	IAAF Continental Cup	Marrakech, Morocco	
400 m hurdles	52.74	Sally Gunnell	19 August 1993	World Championships	Stuttgart, Germany	
3000 m steeplechase	9:07.87	Elizabeth Bird	10 August 2022	Herculis	Fontvieille, Monaco	
High jump	1.98 m (Note: record set during heptathlon competition)	Katarina Johnson-Thompson	12 August 2016	Olympic Games	Rio de Janeiro, Brazil	
Pole vault	4.81 m	Holly Bradshaw	15 July 2017	10th International Pole Vault Meeting	Rottach-Egern, Germany	
Long jump	7.07 m (+0.4 m/s)	Shara Proctor	28 August 2015	World Championships	Beijing, China	
Triple jump	15.15 m (+1.7 m/s)	Ashia Hansen	13 September 1997	Grand Prix Final	Fukuoka, Japan	
Shot put	19.36 m	Judy Oakes	14 August 1988	British Grand Prix	Gateshead, United Kingdom	
Discus throw	65.10 m	Jade Lally	27 February 2016		Sydney, Australia	
Hammer throw	74.54 m	Sophie Hitchon	15 August 2016	Olympic Games	Rio de Janeiro, Brazil	
Javelin throw	66.17 m	Goldie Sayers	14 July 2012	London Grand Prix	London, United Kingdom	
Javelin throw	The specification for the women's javelin changed in 1999. With the old model, Fatima Whitbread threw 77.44 m in 1986.					
Heptathlon	6981 pts	Katarina Johnson-Thompson	2–4 October 2019	World Championships	Doha, Qatar	
Heptathlon	100m H (wind) / High jump / Shot put / 200m (wind) / Long jump (wind) / Javelin / 800m; 13.09 (+0.6 m/s) / 1.95 m / 13.86 m / 23.08 (+1.0 m/s) / 6.77 m (+0.2 m/s) / 43.93 m / 2:07.26					
5000 m walk (track)	21:30.75	Johanna Jackson	13 July 2008		Birmingham, United Kingdom	
10,000 m walk (track)	45:09.57	Lisa Kehler	13 August 2000		Birmingham, United Kingdom	
20 km walk (road)	1:30:41	Johanna Jackson	19 June 2010	Gran Premio Cantones de Marcha	A Coruña, Spain	
4 × 100 m relay	41.88	England; Asha Philip; Imani Lansiquot; Bianca Williams; Dina Asher-Smith	12 August 2018	European Championships	Berlin, Germany	
4 × 400 m relay	3:26.73	England; Helen Frost; Helen Karagounis; Melanie Purkiss; Lisa Miller	31 July 2002	Commonwealth Games	Manchester, England	

== Indoor ==
=== Men ===
Event	Record	Athlete	Date	Meet	Place	Ref.	Video
60 m	6.42	Dwain Chambers	7 March 2009	European Championships	Turin, Italy		
200 m	20.25	Linford Christie	19 February 1995	Meeting Pas de Calais	Liévin, France		
400 m							
800 m	1:44.91	Sebastian Coe	12 March 1983		Cosford, United Kingdom		
1500 m	3:34.20	Peter Elliott	27 February 1990		Seville, Spain		
3000 m	7:34.47	Mo Farah	21 February 2009	Aviva Indoor Grand Prix	Birmingham, United Kingdom		
3000 m	7:33.1+ h	Mo Farah	21 February 2015	Birmingham Indoor Grand Prix	Birmingham, United Kingdom		
5000 m	12:57.08	Marc Scott	12 February 2022	David Hemery Valentine Invitational	Boston, United States		
60 m hurdles	7.42	Tony Jarrett	19 February 1995		Lievin, France		
High jump	2.38 m (Note: outdoor mark ratified as absolute record)	Steve Smith	4 February 1994	annual "Jump to the Music"	Wuppertal, Germany		
Pole vault	5.83 m (Note: outdoor mark ratified as absolute record)	Luke Cutts	25 January 2014	Perche Elite Tour Meeting	Rouen, France		
Long jump	8.26 m A	Greg Rutherford	5 February 2016	New Mexico Collegiate Classic	Albuquerque, United States		
Triple jump	17.75 m	Phillips Idowu	9 March 2008	World Championships	Valencia, Spain		
Shot put	21.49 m	Carl Myerscough	15 March 2003	NCAA Division I Championships	Fayetteville, United States		
Heptathlon	6188 pts	Tim Duckworth	9–10 March 2018	NCAA Division I Championships	College Station, United States		
Heptathlon	60m / Long jump / Shot put / High jump / 60m H / Pole vault / 1000m; 6.84 / 7.74 m / 13.59 m / 2.17 m / 8.23 / 5.16 m / 2:56.23						
3000 m walk	10:30.28	Tom Bosworth	25 February 2018	Glasgow Grand Prix	Glasgow, United Kingdom		
5000 m walk	18:28.70	Tom Bosworth	18 February 2018	British Championships	Birmingham, United Kingdom		
4 × 400 m relay							

=== Women ===
Event	Record	Athlete	Date	Meet	Place	Ref.	Video
60 m	7.03	Dina Asher-Smith	25 February 2023	World Indoor Tour Final	Birmingham, United Kingdom		
60 m	7.03	Dina Asher-Smith	21 March 2026	World Championships	Toruń, Poland		
200 m	22.83	Katharine Merry	14 February 1999	British Championships	Birmingham, United Kingdom		
300 m	36.53	Lina Nielsen	15 February 2025	Keely Klassic	Birmingham, United Kingdom		
400 m	50.02	Nicola Sanders	3 March 2007	European Championships	Birmingham, United Kingdom		
800 m	1:54.87	Keely Hodgkinson	19 February 2026	Meeting Hauts-de-France Pas-de-Calais	Liévin, France		
1500 m	3:58.53	Georgia Hunter Bell	22 March 2026	World Championships	Toruń, Poland		
Mile	4:21.19	Katie Snowden	11 February 2023	Millrose Games	New York City, United States		
3000 m	8:34.55	Joanne Pavey	4 February 2004	Birmingham Norwich Union GP	Birmingham, United Kingdom		
5000 m							
60 m hurdles	7.80	Tiffany Porter	4 March 2011	European Championships	Paris, France		
High jump	1.99 m	Morgan Lake	4 February 2023	Hustopečské skákání	Hustopeče, Czech Republic		
Pole vault	4.87 m (Note: outdoor mark ratified as absolute record)	Holly Bleasdale	21 January 2012		Villeurbanne, France		
Long jump	6.97 m	Lorraine Ugen	5 March 2017	European Championships	Belgrade, Serbia		
Triple jump	15.16 m (Note: outdoor mark ratified as absolute record)	Ashia Hansen	28 February 1998	European Championships	Valencia, Spain		
Shot put							
Pentathlon	5000 pts	Katarina Johnson-Thompson	6 March 2015	European Championships	Prague, Czech Republic		
Pentathlon	60m H / High jump / Shot put / Long jump / 800m; 8.18 / 1.95 m / 12.32 m / 6.89 m / 2:12.78						
3000 m walk							
5000 m walk							
4 × 400 m relay							

=== Mixed ===
Event	Record	Athlete	Date	Meet	Place	Ref.
4 × 400 m relay	3:22.23	England; James Williams; Susanna Banjo; Hannah Kelly; Ben Higgins	5 February 2022	Dynamic New Athletics Indoor Match	Glasgow, United Kingdom	
