= Maddie Coates =

Australian sprinter

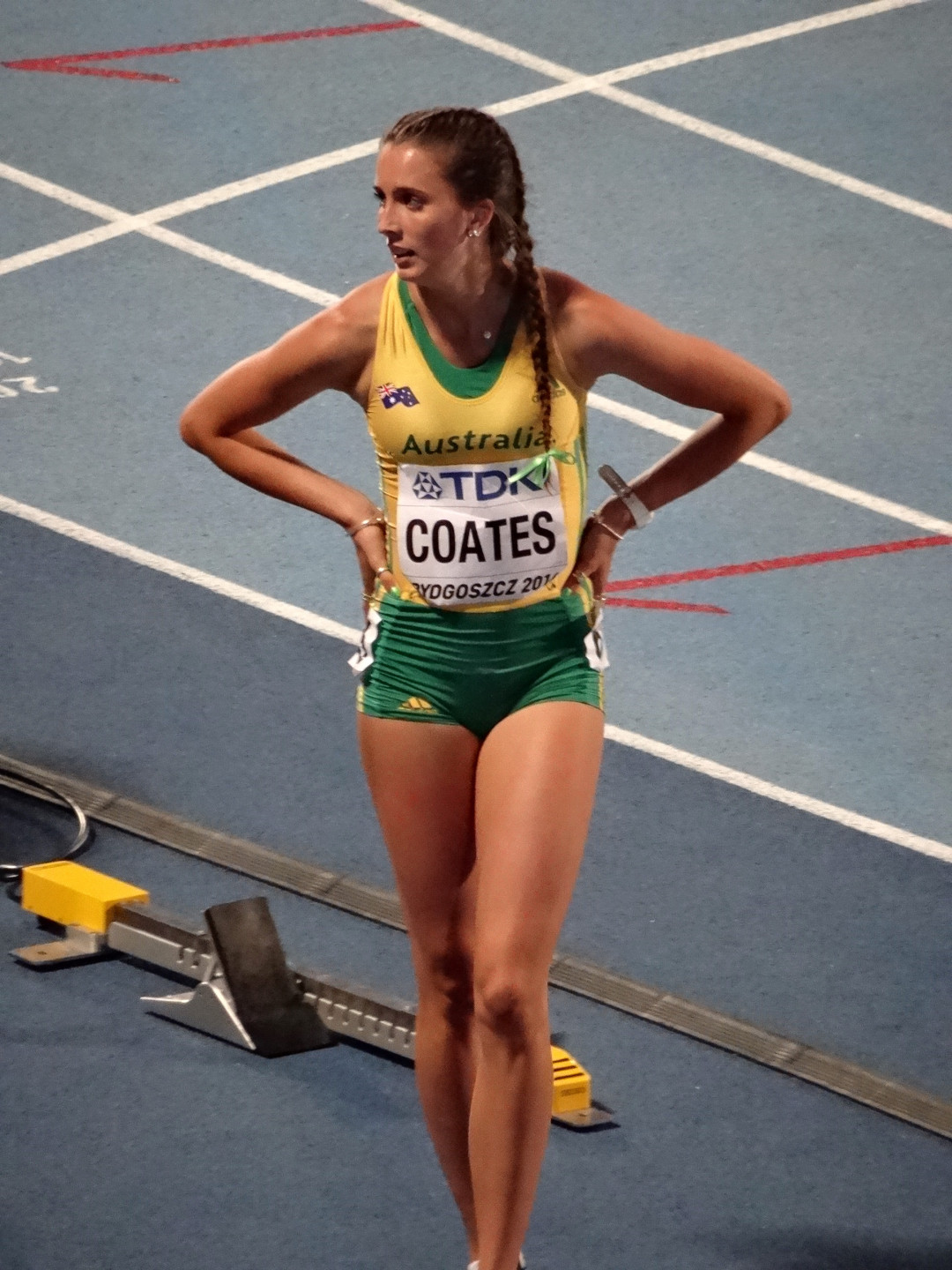
- Coates in 2016

Personal information
- Full name: Maddison Coates
- Nationality: Australian
- Born: 27 September 1997 (age 28) Bundoora, Victoria, Australia
- Height: 183 cm (6 ft 0 in)
- Weight: 64 kg (141 lb)

Sport
- Sport: Athletics
- Event: Sprinting

Maddison Coates (born 27 September 1997) is an Australian athlete. She competed in the women's 4 × 100 metres relay event at the 2019 World Athletics Championships.

Coates' highest world ranking to date is in the 200 metres. At the 2018 Commonwealth Games, she finished third in her heat, 0.23 seconds behind world champion Dina Asher-Smith, but failed to make the final.
