= Makoura Keita =

Guinean sprinter (born 1994)

Personal information
- Nationality: Guinean
- Born: 1 November 1994 (age 31) Fria, Guinea
- Height: 1.75 m (5 ft 9 in)

Sport
- Sport: Track and field
- Event: 100 metres

Makoura Keita (born 1 November 1994) is a Guinean sprinter.

She first saw recognition as a teenager, when she became champion at the 2009 Zone II African Youth Championships (a regional predecessor of the African Youth Athletics Championships) in Bamako, Mali. The Guinean Federation could only send her to the competition by road, and not all the way: her father stepped in to get a taxi to complete the journey. Running in borrowed shoes she acquired just before the race, she won three medals, one of each colour. Her success saw the Guinean sports minister travel to her hometown for a medal presentation and promise her an audience with president Moussa Dadis Camara, and for Guinean-American entrepreneur Hawa Barry Diallo to gift Keita sports equipment. For a 2012 ECOWAS competition held in Abidjan, Ivory Coast, the Guinean Federation decided to send their athletes by road again, possibly to replicate the journey and thus success of Keita in 2009: the 2012 journey from Conakry to Abidjan was even more fraught.

Keita competed in the women's 100 metres event at the 2016 Summer Olympics, where she finished fourth in her heat with a time of 12.66 seconds. She did not advance to the quarterfinals. A joint Japan-Guinea communiqué issued in 2017 ahead of the 2020 Summer Olympics identified Keita as the nation's most promising athlete.

In 2019, she represented Guinea at the 2019 African Games held in Rabat, Morocco. She competed in the women's 100 metres and she finished in 39th place in the heats. Guinean website iMedias has called her "the Guinean queen of 100m"; though she was reigning Guinean champion in the event in 2020, she missed out on the 2020 Olympics (in 2021).

Keita was unanimously elected president of the Guinean athletes' commission, part of the Guinean National Olympic and Sports Committee (CNOSG), in July 2022, by athletes from the 28 sport federations affiliated with the CNOSG. Serving a four-year term, the role is to defend the interests of Guinean athletes within the Olympic movement.
