= Assia Raziki =

Moroccan sprinter (born 1996)

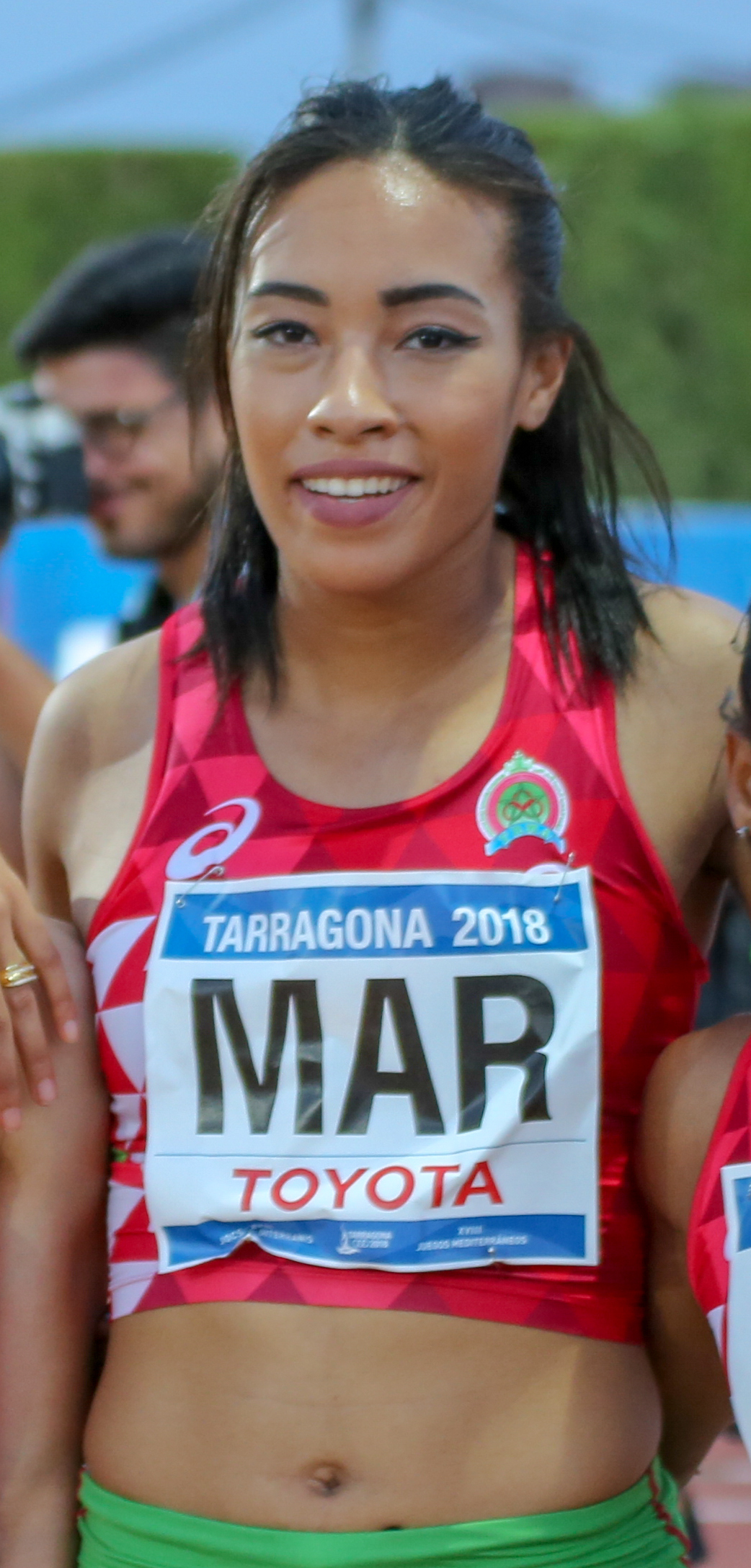
- Assia Raziki in 2018

Personal information
- Native name: آسيا الرزيقي
- Born: 4 October 1996 (age 29)

Sport
- Country: Morocco
- Sport: Athletics
- Events: 100 metres, 200 metres, 400 metres, 800 metres
Medal record
Islamic Solidarity Games
Bronze medal – third place	2022 Konya	800 m
Bronze medal – third place	2022 Konya	4 x 400 m relay
Mediterranean Games
Bronze medal – third place	2022 Oran	800 m
Arab Athletics Championships
Gold medal – first place	2017 Radès	100 m
Gold medal – first place	2017 Radès	200 m
Gold medal – first place	2017 Radès	4×100
Gold medal – first place	2017 Radès	4×400
Silver medal – second place	2019 Cairo	400 m
Bronze medal – third place	2019 Cairo	100 m
Bronze medal – third place	2015 Isa Town	200 m
Jeux de la Francophonie
Bronze medal – third place	2017 Abidjan	400 m

Assia Raziki (born 4 October 1996) is a Moroccan sprinter and middle-distance runner.

== Career ==
She won the bronze medal in the women's 200 metres event at the 2015 Arab Athletics Championships held in Isa Town, Bahrain.

In 2017, she won four gold medals at the Arab Athletics Championships held in Radès, Tunisia. Two years later, at the 2019 Arab Athletics Championships held in Cairo, Egypt, she won a silver and a bronze medal.

She finished fourth in the 100 metres and won a bronze medal in the 400 metres at the 2017 Jeux de la Francophonie, and finished fifth in the 200 metres at the 2017 Islamic Solidarity Games. She also competed at the 2014 African Championships, the 2016 African Championships and the 2018 Mediterranean Games without reaching the final.

She competed in the women's 200 metres and women's 400 metres events at the 2019 African Games held in Rabat, Morocco.
