= Tsaone Sebele =

Botswana sprinter (born 1993)

Tsaone Bakani Sebele
- Born: 27 October 1993 (age 32)
- Citizenship: Motswana
- Occupation: Sprinter

Tsaone Bakani Sebele (born 27 October 1993) is a Motswana sprinter who specializes in the 100 and 200 metres.

In the 100 metres she finished eighth at the 2015 African Games and seventh at the 2018 African Championships. She reached round 2 at the 2017 Summer Universiade. In 2019, she represented Botswana at the 2019 African Games held in Rabat, Morocco. She competed in the women's 100 metres.

In the 200 metres she reached the semi-final at the 2015 African Games. She also competed with a Botswanan team in relay at the 2017 Universiade.

Her personal best times were 11.61 seconds in the 100 metres, achieved in March 2017 in Pretoria; and 23.79 seconds in the 200 metres, achieved in September 2015 in Brazzaville. ==
