= Joanne Loutoy =

Seychellois sprinter

Personal information
- Full name: Joanne Pricilla Loutoy
- Nationality: Seychellois
- Born: 31 December 1992 (age 33) Victoria, Seychelles
- Height: 1.59 m (5 ft 3 in)
- Weight: 54 kg (119 lb)

Sport
- Sport: Track and field
- Event: 60 m

Joanne Pricilla Loutoy (born 31 December 1992) is a Seychellois sprinter. She competed in the 60 metres event at the 2014 IAAF World Indoor Championships.
