= 2018 African Championships in Athletics – Women's 100 metres =

The women's 100 metres event at the 2018 African Championships in Athletics was held on 1 and 2 August in Asaba, Nigeria.

== Medalists ==
Gold	Silver	Bronze
Marie-Josée Ta Lou; Ivory Coast	Janet Amponsah; Ghana	Joy Udo-Gabriel; Nigeria

== Results ==
=== Heats ===
Qualification: First 3 of each heat (Q) and the next 4 fastest (q) qualified for the semifinals.

Wind:
Heat 1: +0.4 m/s, Heat 2: 0.0 m/s, Heat 3: -0.5 m/s, Heat 4: -1.4 m/s

Rank	Heat	Name	Nationality	Time	Notes
1	1	Marie-Josée Ta Lou	Ivory Coast	11.25	Q
2	4	Bassant Hemida	Egypt	11.60	Q
3	1	Janet Amponsah	Ghana	11.63	Q
4	3	Joy Udo-Gabriel	Nigeria	11.64	Q
5	4	Mercy Ntia-Obong	Nigeria	11.66	Q
6	3	Gina Bass	Gambia	11.74	Q
7	4	Halutie Hor	Ghana	11.77	Q
8	3	Natacha Ngoye Akamabi	Republic of the Congo	11.78	Q
9	1	Cassidy Williamson	South Africa	11.79	Q
9	3	Tsaone Sebele	Botswana	11.79	q
11	1	Scovia Ayikoru	Uganda	11.88	q
12	1	Rhoda Njobvu	Zambia	11.90	q
13	2	Tebogo Mamathu	South Africa	11.90	Q
14	2	Adeline Gouenon	Ivory Coast	11.91	Q
15	1	Germaine Abessolo Bivina	Cameroon	11.98	q
16	1	Hafsatu Kamara	Sierra Leone	12.03	
17	4	Jolene Jacobs	Namibia	12.04	
18	2	Phumlile Ndzinisa	Eswatini	12.05	Q
19	4	Loungo Matlhaku	Botswana	12.08	
20	3	Hellen Makumba	Zambia	12.11	
21	1	Ndeye Arame Toure	Senegal	12.14	
22	2	Emefa Juliette Bouley	Togo	12.15	
23	3	Irene Bell Bonong	Cameroon	12.17	
24	4	Joan Cherono	Kenya	12.20	
25	2	Fatoumata Sakho	Mali	12.25	
26	2	Majory Chisanga	Zambia	12.26	
27	3	Freshia Wangari	Kenya	12.33	
28	2	Amy Tall Ndeye	Senegal	12.44	
29	4	Suzanne Toti	Ivory Coast	12.45	
30	3	Worke Kumalo	Ethiopia	12.96	
30	4	Meseret Gudura	Ethiopia	12.96	
	2	Fatuma Lukundula	Democratic Republic of the Congo	DNS	

=== Semifinals ===
Qualification: First 3 of each semifinal (Q) and the next 2 fastest (q) qualified for the final.

Wind:
Heat 1: -0.9 m/s, Heat 2: -2.4 m/s

Rank	Heat	Name	Nationality	Time	Notes
1	1	Marie-Josée Ta Lou	Ivory Coast	11.26	Q
2	1	Tebogo Mamathu	South Africa	11.54	Q
3	1	Halutie Hor	Ghana	11.61	Q
4	2	Joy Udo-Gabriel	Nigeria	11.68	Q
5	2	Janet Amponsah	Ghana	11.68	Q
6	1	Tsaone Sebele	Botswana	11.75	q
7	1	Mercy Ntia-Obong	Nigeria	11.77	q
8	1	Bassant Hemida	Egypt	11.86	
9	2	Gina Bass	Gambia	11.90	Q
10	2	Cassidy Williamson	South Africa	11.91	
11	2	Adeline Gouenon	Ivory Coast	11.92	
12	2	Scovia Ayikoru	Uganda	11.93	
13	2	Natacha Ngoye Akamabi	Republic of the Congo	11.97	
14	2	Rhoda Njobvu	Zambia	12.09	
15	1	Phumlile Ndzinisa	Eswatini	12.10	
16	1	Germaine Abessolo Bivina	Cameroon	12.10	

=== Final ===
Wind: -2.3 m/s

Rank	Lane	Athlete	Nationality	Time	Notes
1st place, gold medalist(s)	4	Marie-Josée Ta Lou	Ivory Coast	11.15	
2nd place, silver medalist(s)	3	Janet Amponsah	Ghana	11.54	
3rd place, bronze medalist(s)	5	Joy Udo-Gabriel	Nigeria	11.58	
4	7	Halutie Hor	Ghana	11.64	
5	2	Mercy Ntia-Obong	Nigeria	11.69	
6	6	Tebogo Mamathu	South Africa	11.73	
7	1	Tsaone Sebele	Botswana	11.83	
8	8	Gina Bass	Gambia	11.85	
