= 2019 IAAF World Relays – Women's 4 × 100 metres relay =

Women's 4 × 100 metres relay at the 2019 IAAF World Relays
- Venue: Nissan Stadium
- Dates: 11 May (heats) & 12 (final)
- Nations: 23
- Winning time: 43.27

Medalists
| gold medal | Mikiah Brisco; Ashley Henderson; Dezerea Bryant; Aleia Hobbs | United States |
| silver medal | Gayon Evans; Natasha Morrison; Sashalee Forbes; Jonielle Smith; Sherone Simpson* | Jamaica |
| bronze medal | Lisa Marie Kwayie; Alexandra Burghardt; Gina Lückenkemper; Rebekka Haase; Lisa Mayer* | Germany |

The women's 4 × 100 metres relay at the 2019 IAAF World Relays was held at the Nissan Stadium on 11 and 12 May.

== Records ==
Prior to the competition, the records were as follows:

| World record | United States (Tianna Madison, Allyson Felix, Bianca Knight, Carmelita Jeter) | 40.82 | (United Kingdom) London, Great Britain | 10 August 2012 |
| Championship record | United States (Tianna Bartoletta, Alexandria Anderson, Jeneba Tarmoh, LaKeisha Lawson) | 41.88 | (The Bahamas) Nassau, Bahamas | 24 May 2014 |
| World Leading | University of Southern California | 42.77 | Los Angeles, United States | 28 April 2019 |

== Results ==
| KEY: | Q | Qualified | q | Fastest non-qualifiers | WL | World leading | CR | Championship record | NR | National record | SB | Seasonal best | WC | 2019 World Championships qualification |

=== Heats ===
Qualification: First 2 of each heat (Q) plus the 2 fastest times (q) advanced to the final.

| Rank | Heat | Nation | Athletes | Time | Notes |
|---|---|---|---|---|---|
| 1 | 1 | United States | Mikiah Brisco, Ashley Henderson, Dezerea Bryant, Aleia Hobbs | 42.51 | Q, WL, *WC |
| 2 | 3 | Germany | Lisa Marie Kwayie, Lisa Mayer, Gina Lückenkemper, Rebekka Haase | 43.03 | Q, SB, *WC |
| 3 | 1 | Brazil | Andressa Fidelis, Lorraine Martins, Franciela Krasucki, Vitoria Cristina Rosa | 43.07 | Q, SB, *WC |
| 4 | 3 | Jamaica | Sherone Simpson, Natasha Morrison, Shashalee Forbes, Jonielle Smith | 43.08 | Q, SB, *WC |
| 5 | 3 | Australia | Sally Pearson, Maddie Coates, Riley Day, Naa Anang | 43.19 | q, SB, *WC |
| 6 | 3 | Italy | Johanelis Herrera Abreu, Gloria Hooper, Anna Bongiorni, Irene Siragusa | 43.40 | q, SB, *WC |
| 7 | 1 | Trinidad and Tobago | Kamaria Durant, Michelle-Lee Ahye, Reyare Thomas, Semoy Hackett | 43.67 | SB, *WC |
| 8 | 3 | Kazakhstan | Rima Kashafutdinova, Elina Mikhina, Svetlana Golendova, Olga Safronova | 43.71 | *WC |
| 9 | 2 | Denmark | Astrid Glenner-Frandsen, Ida Karstoft, Mette Graversgaard, Mathilde Kramer | 43.90 | Q, NR, *WC |
| 10 | 3 | Ireland | Ciara Neville, Gina Akpe-Moses, Rhasidat Adeleke, Patience Jumbo Gula | 44.02 | SB |
| 11 | 2 | Ghana | Flings Owusu-Agyapong, Gemma Acheampong, Persis William-Mensah, Halutie Hor | 44.12 | Q, SB, *WC |
| 12 | 2 | Thailand | On-Uma Chattha, Khanrutai Pakdee, Tassaporn Wannakit, Supawan Thipat | 44.24 | |
| 13 | 1 | Japan | Anna Doi, Miku Yamada, Ichiko Iki, Naoka Miyake | 44.24 | SB |
| 14 | 1 | Ukraine | Hanna Plotitsyna, Hrystyna Stuy, Yana Kachur, Mariya Mokrova | 44.55 | SB |
| 15 | 3 | Czech Republic | Klára Seidlová, Marcela Pírková, Jana Slaninová, Lucie Domská | 44.67 | SB |
| 16 | 3 | Ecuador | Marina Poroso, Gabriela Suárez, Narcisa Landazuri, Ángela Tenorio | 44.74 | SB |
| 17 | 2 | Nigeria | Joy Udo-Gabriel, Patience Okon George, Favour Ofili, Rosemary Chukwuma | 45.07 | SB |
| | 1 | Poland | Kamila Ciba, Katarzyna Sokólska, Marika Popowicz-Drapała, Ewa Swoboda | DNF | |
| | 1 | South Africa | Rose Xeyi, Tamzin Thomas, Justine Palframan, Tebogo Mamathu | DNF | |
| | 2 | France | Maroussia Paré, Sarah Richard Mingas, Cynthia Leduc, Carolle Zahi | DNF | |
| | 2 | Great Britain | Kristal Awuah, Desiree Henry, Ashleigh Nelson, Daryll Neita | DNF | |
| | 1 | China | Liang Xiaojing, Wei Yongli, Kong Lingwei, Ge Manqi | DQ | R170.6(c) |
| | 2 | Canada | Farah Jacques, Crystal Emmanuel, Shaina Harrison, Khamica Bingham | DQ | R170.7 |

=== Final ===
| Rank | Lane | Nation | Athletes | Time | Notes | Points |
|---|---|---|---|---|---|---|
| 1st place, gold medalist(s) | 5 | United States | Mikiah Brisco, Ashley Henderson, Dezerea Bryant, Aleia Hobbs | 43.27 | | 8 |
| 2nd place, silver medalist(s) | 8 | Jamaica | Gayon Evans, Natasha Morrison, Sashalee Forbes, Jonielle Smith | 43.29 | | 7 |
| 3rd place, bronze medalist(s) | 7 | Germany | Lisa Marie Kwayie, Alexandra Burghardt, Gina Lückenkemper, Rebekka Haase | 43.68 | | 6 |
| 4 | 6 | Brazil | Ana Carolina Azevedo, Lorraine Martins, Franciela Krasucki, Vitoria Cristina Rosa | 43.75 | | 5 |
| 5 | 2 | Italy | Johanelis Herrera Abreu, Gloria Hooper, Anna Bongiorni, Irene Siragusa | 44.29 | | 4 |
| 6 | 3 | Australia | Sally Pearson, Nana Adoma Owusu-Afriyie, Riley Day, Naa Anang | 44.62 | | 3 |
| 7 | 9 | Ghana | Flings Owusu-Agyapong, Gemma Acheampong, Persis William-Mensah, Halutie Hor | 44.77 | | 2 |
| 8 | 4 | Denmark | Louise Østergaard, Astrid Glenner-Frandsen, Mette Graversgaard, Mathilde Kramer | 45.32 | | 1 |
