= 2019 World Athletics Championships – Women's 100 metres =

Women's 100 metres at the 2019 World Championships
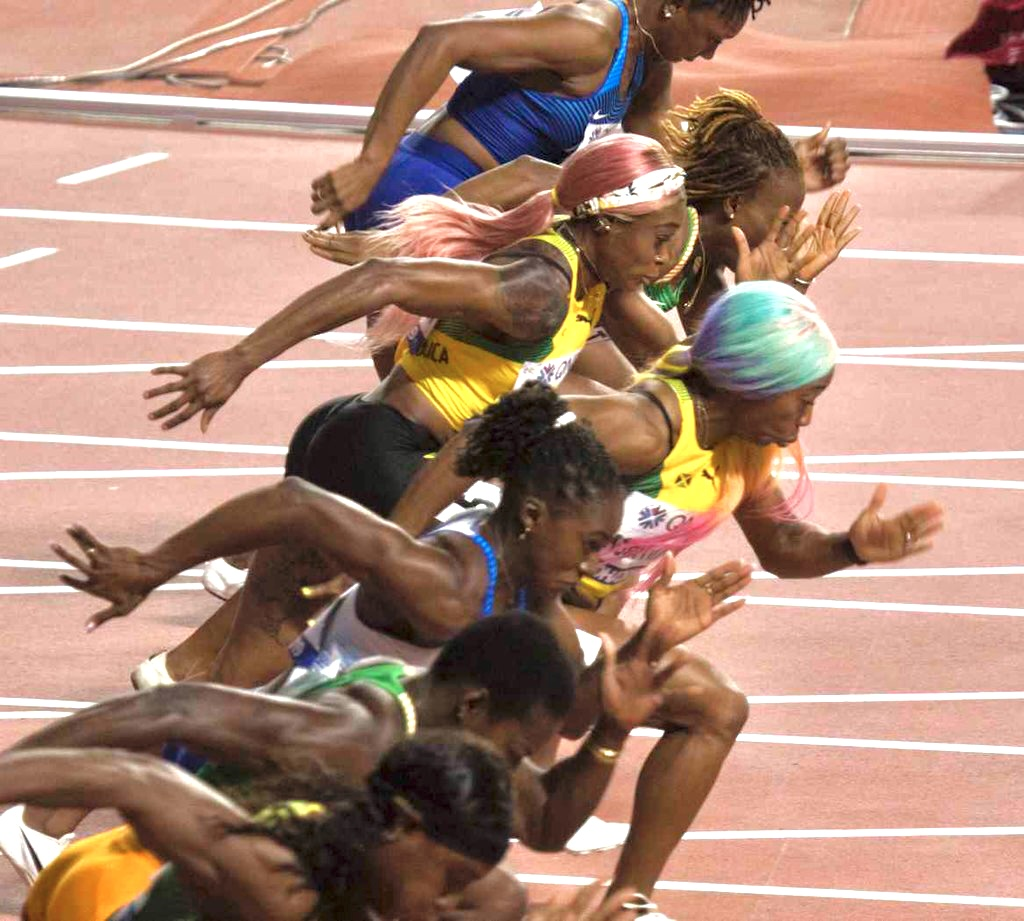
- The start of the final.
- Venue: Khalifa International Stadium
- Dates: 28 September (heats); 29 September (semi-final & final)
- Competitors: 47 from 31 nations
- Winning time: 10.71

Medalists
gold medal	Shelly-Ann Fraser-Pryce	Jamaica
silver medal	Dina Asher-Smith	Great Britain
bronze medal	Marie-Josée Ta Lou	Ivory Coast

Video on YouTube Official Video

The women's 100 metres at the 2019 World Athletics Championships was held at the Khalifa International Stadium in Doha, Qatar, on 28 to 29 September 2019.

== Summary ==
This was the first major championships for Shelly-Ann Fraser-Pryce after giving birth and the maternity leave in 2017. Here, against the Olympic Champion Elaine Thompson and the defending champion Tori Bowie, Fraser-Pryce dominated the heats and the semi-finals. In the final, she took the lead on the first step and pulled away to a dominating victory in a world-leading time of 10.71. While Marie-Josée Ta Lou was the next fastest out of the blocks, Dina Asher-Smith closed quickly to overtake Ta Lou for a clear silver medal, leaving the defending silver medalist with the bronze.

For 32-year-old Fraser-Pryce, it was only .01 off of her personal best and Marion Jones' Championship record, and one of the fastest times in history. Asher-Smith's 10.83 was the British national record.

== Records ==
Before the competition records were as follows:

Record	Perf.	Athlete	Nat.	Date	Location
World	10.49	Florence Griffith-Joyner	USA	16 Jul 1988	Indianapolis, United States
Championship	10.70	Marion Jones	USA	28 Aug 1999	Seville, Spain
World leading	10.73	Shelly-Ann Fraser-Pryce	JAM	21 Jun 2019	Kingston, Jamaica
World leading	10.73	Elaine Thompson	JAM	21 Jun 2019	Kingston, Jamaica
African	10.78	Murielle Ahouré	CIV	11 Jun 2016	Montverde, United States
Asian	10.79	Li Xuemei	CHN	18 Oct 1997	Shanghai, China
NACAC	10.49	Florence Griffith-Joyner	USA	16 Jul 1988	Indianapolis, United States
South American	10.91	Rosângela Santos	BRA	6 Aug 2017	London, Great Britain
European	10.73	Christine Arron	FRA	19 Aug 1998	Budapest, Hungary
Oceanian	11.11	Melissa Breen	AUS	9 Feb 2014	Canberra, Australia

The following records were set at the competition:

Record	Perf.	Athlete	Nat.	Date
Nepalese	12.72	Sarswati Chaudhary	NEP	28 Sep 2019
World Leading	10.71	Shelly-Ann Fraser-Pryce	JAM	29 Sep 2019
British	10.83	Dina Asher-Smith	GBR	29 Sep 2019

== Schedule ==
The event schedule, in local time (UTC+3), was as follows:

Date	Time	Round
28 September	16:30	Heats
29 September	21:20	Semi-finals
29 September	23:20	Final

== Results ==
=== Heats ===
The first 3 in each heat ( Q ) and the next six fastest ( q ) qualified for the semifinals. The overall results were as follows:

Rank	Heat	Name	Nationality	Time	Notes
1	1	Shelly-Ann Fraser-Pryce	Jamaica	10.80	Q
2	2	Marie-Josée Ta Lou	Ivory Coast	10.85	Q, PB
3	4	Dina Asher-Smith	Great Britain & N.I.	10.96	Q
4	1	Murielle Ahouré	Ivory Coast	11.05	Q, SB
5	2	Daryll Neita	Great Britain & N.I.	11.12	Q, PB
6	3	Elaine Thompson	Jamaica	11.14	Q
7	5	Mujinga Kambundji	Switzerland	11.17	Q
8	6	Dafne Schippers	Netherlands	11.17	Q
9	5	Liang Xiaojing	China	11.18	Q
10	2	Tatjana Pinto	Germany	11.19	Q
11	4	English Gardner	United States	11.20	Q
12	6	Teahna Daniels	United States	11.20	Q
13	4	Jonielle Smith	Jamaica	11.20	Q
14	3	Kelly-Ann Baptiste	Trinidad and Tobago	11.21	Q
15	3	Morolake Akinosun	United States	11.23	Q
16	4	Tynia Gaither	Bahamas	11.24	q
17	6	Gina Bass	Gambia	11.25	Q
18	2	Wei Yongli	China	11.28	q
19	3	Ge Manqi	China	11.28	q
20	1	Gina Lückenkemper	Germany	11.29	Q
21	1	Ewa Swoboda	Poland	11.29	q
22	5	Tori Bowie	United States	11.30	Q
23	2	Crystal Emmanuel	Canada	11.30	q
24	6	Imani-Lara Lansiquot	Great Britain & N.I.	11.31	q
25	4	Maja Mihalinec	Slovenia	11.32	
26	6	Rosângela Santos	Brazil	11.32	
27	3	Orlann Ombissa-Dzangue	France	11.34	
28	3	Asha Philip	Great Britain & N.I.	11.35	
29	6	Ajla Del Ponte	Switzerland	11.36	
30	1	Diana Vaisman	Israel	11.39	
31	6	Olga Safronova	Kazakhstan	11.40	
32	5	Ángela Tenorio	Ecuador	11.40	
33	5	Vitória Cristina Rosa	Brazil	11.41	
34	1	Tebogo Mamathu	South Africa	11.42	
35	2	Marije van Hunenstijn	Netherlands	11.48	
36	4	Salomé Kora	Switzerland	11.48	
37	3	Dutee Chand	India	11.48	
38	4	Lorène Bazolo	Portugal	11.51	
39	5	Zoe Hobbs	New Zealand	11.58	
40	5	Hellen Makumba	Zambia	11.73	
41	2	Inna Eftimova	Bulgaria	11.79	
42	1	Andrea Purica	Venezuela	11.96	
43	6	Loi Im Lan	Macau	12.10	
44	2	Gorete Semedo	São Tomé and Príncipe	12.17	
45	4	Charlotte Afriat	Monaco	12.67	
46	1	Sarswati Chaudhary	Nepal	12.72	NR
47	3	Zarinae Sapong	Northern Mariana Islands	13.14	
	5	Blessing Okagbare	Nigeria	DNS	

=== Semi-finals ===
Video on YouTube Official Video

The first two in each heat (Q) and the next two fastest (q) qualify for the final.

Rank	Heat	Name	Nationality	Time	Notes
1	3	Shelly-Ann Fraser-Pryce	Jamaica	10.81	Q
2	2	Dina Asher-Smith	Great Britain & N.I.	10.87	Q, SB
3	1	Marie-Josée Ta Lou	Ivory Coast	10.87	Q
4	1	Elaine Thompson	Jamaica	11.00	Q
5	3	Murielle Ahouré	Ivory Coast	11.05	Q, SB
6	2	Jonielle Smith	Jamaica	11.06	Q
7	3	Dafne Schippers	Netherlands	11.07	q
8	1	Teahna Daniels	United States	11.10	q
9	2	Mujinga Kambundji	Switzerland	11.10	
10	2	Morolake Akinosun	United States	11.17	SB
11	1	Daryll Neita	Great Britain & N.I.	11.18	
12	3	Kelly-Ann Baptiste	Trinidad and Tobago	11.19	
13	1	Tynia Gaither	Bahamas	11.20	
13	2	Liang Xiaojing	China	11.20	
15	1	Gina Bass	Gambia	11.24	
16	2	Ewa Swoboda	Poland	11.27	
17	1	Wei Yongli	China	11.28	
18	3	Tatjana Pinto	Germany	11.29	
19	2	Crystal Emmanuel	Canada	11.29	
20	1	Gina Lückenkemper	Germany	11.30	
21	3	Ge Manqi	China	11.31	
22	3	Imani-Lara Lansiquot	Great Britain & N.I.	11.35	
	2	English Gardner	United States	DNF	
	3	Tori Bowie	United States	DNS	

=== Final ===
The final was started on 29 September at 23:20.

Rank	Lane	Name	Nationality	Time	Notes
1st place, gold medalist(s)	6	Shelly-Ann Fraser-Pryce	Jamaica	10.71	WL
2nd place, silver medalist(s)	7	Dina Asher-Smith	Great Britain & N.I.	10.83	NR
3rd place, bronze medalist(s)	4	Marie-Josée Ta Lou	Ivory Coast	10.90	
4	5	Elaine Thompson	Jamaica	10.93	
5	8	Murielle Ahouré	Ivory Coast	11.02	SB
6	9	Jonielle Smith	Jamaica	11.06	
7	3	Teahna Daniels	United States	11.19	
	2	Dafne Schippers	Netherlands	DNS	
