= 2017 World Championships in Athletics – Women's 4 × 100 metres relay =

Women's 4 × 100 metres relay at the 2017 World Championships
- Venue: Olympic Stadium
- Dates: 12 August (heats & final)
- Competitors: 63 from 15 nations
- Winning time: 41.82

Medalists
gold medal	Aaliyah Brown; Allyson Felix; Morolake Akinosun; Tori Bowie	United States
silver medal	Asha Philip; Desirèe Henry; Dina Asher-Smith; Daryll Neita	Great Britain
bronze medal	Jura Levy; Natasha Morrison; Simone Facey; Sashalee Forbes	Jamaica

Video on YouTube Official Video

The women's 4 × 100 metres relay at the 2017 World Championships in Athletics was held at the London Olympic Stadium on 12 August.

== Summary ==
USA with Aaliyah Brown and the home British team with Asha Philip were out fast, gaining slightly on Tatjana Pinto for Germany to their outside, while outside of Germany, Jura Levy had Jamaica pulling away. USA and Jamaica had smooth handoffs to Allyson Felix and Natasha Morrison respectively, but the British team had a hesitation on the handoff to Desirèe Henry, losing a slight amount of time. On the backstretch, Henry passed Germany's Lisa Mayer. Felix made a comfortable hand off to Morolake Akinosun slightly ahead of Jamaica's handoff to Simone Facey, GBR handing off to Dina Asher-Smith two steps later. Through the final turn, Germany's Gina Lückenkemper made up a lot of ground as the field tightened. At the final handoff Jamaica's Sashalee Forbes took a quick glance back, USA's Tori Bowie took a more serious look to make sure she got the baton, effectively in 4 × 400 metres handoff style, while Germany to Rebekka Haase and the British to Daryll Neita used the more conventional blind handoffs to pull closer. Onto the straightaway, Bowie had a half metre lead over Forbes and Neita, who were virtually even. Neita looked to stay with Bowie for the first half of the straightaway, separating from Jamaica before Bowie put in some clear separation for the USA win. As Neita tightened, Forbes started to close but not enough for Jamaica to take the silver away from the British.

== Records ==
Before the competition records were as follows:

Record	Perf.	Team	Date	Location
World	40.82	United States; Tianna Madison, Allyson Felix, Bianca Knight, Carmelita Jeter	10 Aug 2012	London, United Kingdom
Championship	41.07	Jamaica; Veronica Campbell-Brown, Natasha Morrison, Elaine Thompson, Shelly-Ann Fraser-Pryce	29 Aug 2015	Beijing, China
World leading	42.12	(United States) University of Oregon; Makenzie Dunmore, Deajah Stevens, Hannah Cunliffe, Ariana Washington	15 Apr 2017	Torrance, United States
World leading	42.12	(United States) Louisiana State University; Mikiah Brisco, Kortnei Johnson, Jada Martin, Aleia Hobbs	29 Apr 2017	Baton Rouge, United States
African	42.39	Nigeria; Beatrice Utondu, Faith Idehen, Christy Opara-Thompson, Mary Onyali-Omagbemi	7 Aug 1992	Barcelona, Spain
Asian	42.23	China; Xiao Lin, Li Yali, Liu Xiaomei, Li Xuemei	23 Oct 1997	Shanghai, China
NACAC	40.82	United States; Tianna Madison, Allyson Felix, Bianca Knight, Carmelita Jeter	10 Aug 2012	London, United Kingdom
South American	42.29	Brazil; Evelyn dos Santos, Ana Cláudia Lemos, Franciela Krasucki, Rosângela Santos	18 Aug 2013	Moscow, Russia
European	41.37	East Germany; Silke Gladisch-Möller, Sabine Rieger, Ingrid Auerswald-Lange, Marlies Göhr	6 Oct 1985	Canberra, Australia
Oceanian	42.99	Australia; Rachael Massey, Suzanne Broadrick, Jodi Lambert, Melinda Gainsford-Taylor	18 Mar 2000	Pietersburg, South Africa

The following records were set at the competition:

Record	Perf.	Team	Date
World leading	41.84	United States; Aaliyah Brown, Allyson Felix, Morolake Akinosun, Ariana Washington	12 Apr 2017
World leading	41.82	United States; Aaliyah Brown, Allyson Felix, Morolake Akinosun, Ariana Washington	12 Apr 2017
Swiss	42.50	Switzerland; Ajla Del Ponte, Sarah Atcho, Mujinga Kambundji, Salomé Kora	12 Apr 2017

== Qualification criteria ==
The first eight placed teams at the 2017 IAAF World Relays and the host country qualify automatically for entry with remaining places being filled by teams with the fastest performances during the qualification period.

== Schedule ==
The event schedule, in local time (UTC+1), is as follows:

Date	Time	Round
12 August	10:35	Heats
12 August	21:30	Final

== Results ==
=== Heats ===
Video on YouTube Official Video

The first round took place on 12 August in two heats as follows:

Heat	1	2
Start time	10:35	10:44
Photo finish	link	link

The first three in each heat ( Q ) and the next two fastest ( q ) qualified for the final. The overall results were as follows:

Rank	Heat	Lane	Nation	Athletes	Time	Notes
1	1	4	United States	Aaliyah Brown, Allyson Felix, Morolake Akinosun, Ariana Washington	41.84	Q, WL
2	1	5	Great Britain & N.I.	Asha Philip, Desirèe Henry, Dina Asher-Smith, Daryll Neita	41.93	Q, SB
3	2	6	Germany	Tatjana Pinto, Lisa Mayer, Gina Lückenkemper, Rebekka Haase	42.34	Q
4	1	9	Switzerland	Ajla Del Ponte, Sarah Atcho, Mujinga Kambundji, Salomé Kora	42.50	Q, NR
5	2	5	Jamaica	Christania Williams, Natasha Morrison, Jura Levy, Sashalee Forbes	42.50	Q
6	1	8	Netherlands	Madiea Ghafoor, Dafne Schippers, Naomi Sedney, Jamile Samuel	42.64	q, SB
7	2	9	Brazil	Franciela Krasucki, Ana Cláudia Lemos, Vitória Cristina Rosa, Rosângela Santos	42.77	Q, SB
8	2	2	Trinidad and Tobago	Kelly-Ann Baptiste, Michelle-Lee Ahye, Semoy Hackett, Khalifa St. Fort	42.91	q, SB
9	1	7	France	Orlann Ombissa-Dzangue, Ayodelé Ikuesan, Maroussia Paré, Carolle Zahi	42.92	SB
10	1	6	Ghana	Flings Owusu-Agyapong, Gemma Acheampong, Akua Obeng-Akrofi, Janet Amponsah	43.68	SB
11	2	4	Ukraine	Alina Kalistratova, Yelyzaveta Bryzhina, Yana Kachur, Hanna Plotitsyna	43.77	
12	1	3	Ecuador	Yuliana Angulo, Narcisa Landazuri, Romina Cifuentes, Ángela Tenorio	43.94	SB
13	2	8	Kazakhstan	Rima Kashafutdinova, Viktoriya Zyabkina, Svetlana Golendova, Olga Safronova	45.47	
	2	3	Bahamas	Devynne Charlton, Carmiesha Cox, Jenae Ambrose, Tynia Gaither	DNF	
	2	7	China	Tao Yujia, Wei Yongli, Ge Manqi, Liang Xiaojing	DQ	R 170.7
	1	2	Nigeria		DNS	

=== Final ===
The final took place on 12 August at 20:05. The results were as follows (photo finish):

Rank	Lane	Nation	Athletes	Time	Notes
1st place, gold medalist(s)	4	United States	Aaliyah Brown, Allyson Felix, Morolake Akinosun, Tori Bowie	41.82	WL
2nd place, silver medalist(s)	5	Great Britain & N.I.	Asha Philip, Desirèe Henry, Dina Asher-Smith, Daryll Neita	42.12	
3rd place, bronze medalist(s)	7	Jamaica	Jura Levy, Natasha Morrison, Simone Facey, Sashalee Forbes	42.19	SB
4	6	Germany	Tatjana Pinto, Lisa Mayer, Gina Lückenkemper, Rebekka Haase	42.36	
5	9	Switzerland	Ajla Del Ponte, Sarah Atcho, Mujinga Kambundji, Salomé Kora	42.51	
6	3	Trinidad and Tobago	Semoy Hackett, Michelle-Lee Ahye, Khalifa St. Fort, Kelly-Ann Baptiste	42.62	SB
7	8	Brazil	Franciela Krasucki, Ana Cláudia Lemos, Vitória Cristina Rosa, Rosângela Santos	42.63	SB
8	2	Netherlands	Tessa van Schagen, Dafne Schippers, Naomi Sedney, Jamile Samuel	43.07	
