= Athletics at the 2018 Commonwealth Games – Women's 100 metres =

Women's 100 metres at the 2018 Commonwealth Games
- Venue: Carrara Stadium
- Dates: 8 April (heats and semifinals); 9 April (final)
- Competitors: 42 from 28 nations
- Winning time: 11.14

Medalists
gold medal	Michelle-Lee Ahye	Trinidad and Tobago
silver medal	Christania Williams	Jamaica
bronze medal	Gayon Evans	Jamaica

The women's 100 metres at the 2018 Commonwealth Games, as part of the athletics programme, took place at the Carrara Stadium on 8 and 9 April 2018.

== Records ==
Prior to this competition, the world and Games records were as follows:

World record	Florence Griffith Joyner (USA)	10.49	Indianapolis, United States	16 July 1988
Games record	Blessing Okagbare (NGR)	10.85	Glasgow, Scotland	28 July 2014

== Schedule ==
The schedule was as follows:

Date	Time	Round
Sunday 8 April 2018	14:05	First round
Sunday 8 April 2018	17:12	Semifinals
Monday 9 April 2018	21:50	Final

All times are Australian Eastern Standard Time (UTC+10).

== Results ==
=== First round ===
The first round consisted of six heats. The three fastest competitors per heat, along with the six fastest losers, advanced to the semifinals.

Heat 1

Rank	Lane	Name	Reaction time	Result	Notes	Qual.
1	7	Halutie Hor (GHA)	0.148	11.45	PB	Q
2	3	Khalifa St. Fort (TTO)	0.129	11.57		Q
3	4	Isoken Igbinosun (NGR)	0.153	11.69		Q
4	5	Hafsatu Kamara (SLE)	0.137	12.00		
5	8	Joanilla Janvier (MRI)	0.135	12.47		
6	6	Shirin Akter (BAN)	0.186	12.72		
7	2	Samantha Rofo (SOL)	0.168	14.24		
				Wind: -1.7 m/s		

Heat 2

Rank	Lane	Name	Reaction time	Result	Notes	Qual.
1	8	Christania Williams (JAM)	0.178	11.28		Q
2	2	Corinne Humphreys (ENG)	0.164	11.62		Q
3	5	Tahesia Harrigan-Scott (IVB)	0.148	11.64		Q
4	7	Scovia Ayikoru (UGA)	0.133	11.86		q
5	4	Fanny Appes Ekanga (CMR)	0.146	12.15		
6	3	Mariatu Koroma (SLE)	0.188	12.28	PB	
7	6	Roslyn Nalin (VAN)	0.155	13.01		
				Wind: +0.8 m/s		

Heat 3

Rank	Lane	Name	Reaction time	Result	Notes	Qual.
1	2	Asha Philip (ENG)	0.144	11.31		Q
2	4	Gina Bass (GAM)	0.141	11.50		Q
3	6	Gemma Acheampong (GHA)	0.129	11.62	=SB	Q
4	7	Ramona Papaioannou (CYP)	0.174	11.65		q
5	3	V'Alonee Robinson (BAH)	0.135	11.73	SB	q
6	8	Charlotte Wingfield (MLT)	0.175	11.99		
7	5	Patricia Taea (COK)	0.146	12.22		
				Wind: +1.4 m/s		

Heat 4

Rank	Lane	Name	Reaction time	Result	Notes	Qual.
1	3	Michelle-Lee Ahye (TTO)	0.168	11.57		Q
2	2	Amy Foster (NIR)	0.140	11.59		Q
3	5	Jennifer Madu (NGR)	0.163	11.62		Q
4	7	Melissa Breen (AUS)	0.158	11.65		q
5	8	Afure Adah (PNG)	0.181	11.99		
6	6	Phumlile Ndzinisa (SWZ)	0.182	12.11		
7	4	Rechelle Meade (AIA)	0.172	12.53		
				Wind: +2.1 m/s		

Heat 5

Rank	Lane	Name	Reaction time	Result	Notes	Qual.
1	2	Natasha Morrison (JAM)	0.151	11.36		Q
2	3	Shenel Crooke (SKN)	0.168	11.62		Q
3	5	Zaidatul Husniah Zulkifli (MAS)	0.154	11.64		Q
4	6	Dolly Mustapha (SLE)	0.220	11.71	PB	q
5	4	Flings Owusu Agyapong (GHA)	0.136	11.74		q
6	8	Waymar Bwereeti (KIR)	0.151	13.81	PB	
–	7	Charifa Abdoullahi Labarang (CMR)	0.152	DNF		
				Wind: -0.2 m/s		

Heat 6

Rank	Lane	Name	Reaction time	Result	Notes	Qual.
1	2	Gayon Evans (JAM)	0.149	11.37		Q
2	3	Joy Udo-Gabriel (NGR)	0.139	11.42	PB	Q
3	8	Reyare Thomas (TTO)	0.145	11.46		Q
4	7	Marie Gisele Eleme (CMR)	0.170	11.88		
5	6	Joanne Loutoy (SEY)	0.149	11.98	SB	
6	4	Ola Buwaro (GAM)	0.134	12.11		
7	5	Makereta Naulu (FIJ)	0.193	12.23		
				Wind: +0.3 m/s		

=== Semifinals ===
Three semi-final heats were held. The two fastest competitors per semi-final, along with the two fastest losers, advanced to the final.

Semifinal 1

Rank	Lane	Name	Reaction time	Result	Notes	Qual.
1	5	Asha Philip (ENG)	0.112	11.21		Q
2	7	Natasha Morrison (JAM)	0.149	11.27		Q
3	6	Khalifa St Fort (TTO)	0.143	11.35		q
4	4	Amy Foster (NIR)	0.134	11.54		
5	9	Jennifer Madu (NGR)	0.151	11.59		
6	2	Flings Owusu Agyapong (GHA)	0.124	11.60		
7	8	Tahesia Harrigan-Scott (IVB)	0.129	11.63		
8	3	Dolly Mustapha (SLE)	0.166	11.91		
				Wind: +0.5 m/s		

Semifinal 2

Rank	Lane	Name	Reaction time	Result	Notes	Qual.
1	7	Michelle-Lee Ahye (TTO)	0.139	11.25		Q
2	5	Gayon Evans (JAM)	0.152	11.37		Q
3	6	Gina Bass (GAM)	0.122	11.64		
4	4	Shenel Crooke (SKN)	0.169	11.69		
5	2	Melissa Breen (AUS)	0.155	11.76	SB	
6	8	Gemma Acheampong (GHA)	0.135	11.79		
7	9	Isoken Igbinosun (NGR)	0.148	11.85		
8	3	V'Alonee Robinson (BAH)	0.136	12.09		
				Wind: -0.1 m/s		

Semifinal 3

Rank	Lane	Name	Reaction time	Result	Notes	Qual.
1	5	Christania Williams (JAM)	0.184	11.22		Q
2	9	Reyare Thomas (TTO)	0.127	11.36		Q
3	4	Halutie Hor (GHA)	0.143	11.46		q
4	7	Joy Udo-Gabriel (NGR)	0.163	11.53		
5	6	Corinne Humphreys (ENG)	0.111	11.66		
6	3	Ramona Papaioannou (CYP)	0.158	11.67		
7	8	Zaidatul Husniah Zulkifli (MAS)	0.153	11.84		
8	2	Scovia Ayikoru (UGA)	0.157	11.99		
				Wind: +0.4 m/s		

=== Final ===
The medals were determined in the final.

Rank	Lane	Name	Reaction time	Result	Notes
1st place, gold medalist(s)	4	Michelle-Lee Ahye (TTO)	0.143	11.14	
2nd place, silver medalist(s)	5	Christania Williams (JAM)	0.245	11.21	
3rd place, bronze medalist(s)	9	Gayon Evans (JAM)	0.154	11.22	PB
4	6	Asha Philip (ENG)	0.129	11.28	
5	7	Natasha Morrison (JAM)	0.157	11.31	
6	2	Khalifa St. Fort (TTO)	0.144	11.37	
7	8	Reyare Thomas (TTO)	0.136	11.51	
8	3	Halutie Hor (GHA)	0.141	11.54	
				Wind: +1.0 m/s	
