= 2016 African Championships in Athletics – Women's 200 metres =

African Women's Track Event held in South Africa

The women's 200 metres event at the 2016 African Championships in Athletics was held on 25 and 26 June in Kings Park Stadium.

== Medalists ==
Gold	Silver	Bronze
Marie Josée Ta Lou; Ivory Coast	Alyssa Conley; South Africa	Gina Bass; Gambia

== Results ==
=== Heats ===
Qualification: First 4 of each heat (Q) and the next 4 fastest (q) qualified for the semifinals.

Wind:
Heat 1: +0.7 m/s, Heat 2: +0.6 m/s, Heat 3: +0.4 m/s, Heat 4: -0.4 m/s, Heat 5: +1.4 m/s

Rank	Heat	Name	Nationality	Time	Notes
1	5	Gina Bass	Gambia	23.14	Q
2	4	Marie Josée Ta Lou	Ivory Coast	23.22	Q
3	1	Justine Palframan	South Africa	23.45	Q
4	2	Alyssa Conley	South Africa	23.52	Q
5	2	Phumlile Ndzinisa	Swaziland	23.67	Q
6	4	Ada Udaya	Liberia	23.75	Q
7	3	Janet Amponsah	Ghana	23.76	Q
8	3	Tamzin Thomas	South Africa	23.92	Q
9	1	Leungo Matlhaku	Botswana	23.99	Q
10	2	Marcelle Bouele Bondo	Republic of the Congo	24.04	Q
11	5	Eunice Kadogo	Kenya	24.05	Q
12	3	Parfaite Gaha	Ivory Coast	24.11	Q
13	2	Adeline Gouenon	Ivory Coast	24.23	Q
13	3	Tegest Tamangu	Ethiopia	24.23	Q
13	5	Flings Owusu-Agyapong	Ghana	24.23	Q
16	3	Rhoda Njobvu	Zambia	24.35	q
17	1	Aurélie Alcindor	Mauritius	24.42	Q
18	2	Josephine Anokye	Ghana	24.51	q
18	4	Assia Raziki	Morocco	24.51	Q
20	1	Natacha Ngoye Akamabi	Republic of the Congo	24.54	Q
21	5	Germaine Abessolo Bivina	Cameroon	24.73	Q
22	4	Millicent Ndoro	Kenya	24.75	Q
23	2	Joanilla Janvier	Mauritius	24.81	q
24	4	Ontiretse Molapisi	Botswana	24.96	q
25	1	Hafsathu Kamara	Sierra Leone	24.99	
26	3	Mary Chepkoech	Kenya	25.05	
27	4	Tsitsi Mahachi	Zimbabwe	25.38	
28	3	Mildred Gamba	Uganda	25.43	
29	4	Prenam Pesse	Togo	25.62	
30	5	Eveline Sanches	Cape Verde	25.73	
31	5	Yvonne Thomas	Zimbabwe	25.89	
32	1	Sukoluhle Mlalazi	Zimbabwe	26.13	
33	2	Viola Lado	South Sudan	26.95	NR
34	5	Margret Hassan	South Sudan	27.61	
35	5	Rachel Zenzo	Democratic Republic of the Congo	28.25	
	1	Murielle Ahouré	Ivory Coast	DNS	
	2	Amal Mohamed Bashir	Somalia	DNS	

=== Semifinals ===
Qualification: First 2 of each heat (Q) and the next 2 fastest (q) qualified for the final.

Wind:
Heat 1: +0.8 m/s, Heat 2: +1.0 m/s, Heat 3: +2.0 m/s

Rank	Heat	Name	Nationality	Time	Notes
1	2	Marie Josée Ta Lou	Ivory Coast	22.89	Q
2	1	Alyssa Conley	South Africa	23.02	Q
3	1	Gina Bass	Gambia	23.31	Q
4	3	Justine Palframan	South Africa	23.37	Q
5	2	Janet Amponsah	Ghana	23.54	Q
6	2	Leungo Matlhaku	Botswana	23.80	q
6	3	Ada Udaya	Liberia	23.80	Q
8	3	Adeline Gouenon	Ivory Coast	23.96	q
9	2	Marcelle Bouele Bondo	Republic of the Congo	23.99	
10	3	Eunice Kadogo	Kenya	24.04	
11	1	Parfaite Gaha	Ivory Coast	24.23	
12	1	Aurélie Alcindor	Mauritius	24.23	
13	2	Assia Raziki	Morocco	24.31	
13	3	Josephine Anokye	Ghana	24.31	
15	3	Germaine Abessolo Bivina	Cameroon	24.42	
16	2	Tegest Tamangu	Ethiopia	24.45	
17	1	Rhoda Njobvu	Zambia	24.50	
18	2	Joanilla Janvier	Mauritius	24.83	
	3	Natacha Ngoye Akamabi	Republic of the Congo	DNF	
	3	Phumlile Ndzinisa	Swaziland	DNF	
	1	Flings Owusu-Agyapong	Ghana	DNS	
	1	Millicent Ndoro	Kenya	DNS	
	1	Ontiretse Molapisi	Botswana	DNS	
	2	Tamzin Thomas	South Africa	DNS	

=== Final ===
Wind: +1.2 m/s

Rank	Lane	Athlete	Nationality	Time	Notes
1st place, gold medalist(s)	5	Marie Josée Ta Lou	Ivory Coast	22.81	
2nd place, silver medalist(s)	4	Alyssa Conley	South Africa	22.84	
3rd place, bronze medalist(s)	3	Gina Bass	Gambia	22.92	
4	6	Justine Palframan	South Africa	23.22	
5	8	Janet Amponsah	Ghana	23.45	
6	7	Ada Udaya	Liberia	23.67	
7	1	Leungo Matlhaku	Botswana	24.18	
	2	Adeline Gouenon	Ivory Coast	DNS	
