= Joy Udo-Gabriel =

Nigerian sprinter (born 1999)

Personal information
- Born: 2 June 1999 (age 27) Abia State, Nigeria
- Education: University of Lagos
- Height: 1.60 m (5 ft 3 in)
- Weight: 63 kg (139 lb)

Sport
- Sport: Athletics
- Events: 100 metres, 200 metres
- Club: Unattached
- Coached by: Feyi Shayo Daramola Udoh (2021–)
Medal record
Women's athletics
Representing Nigeria
African Championships
| Gold medal – first place | 2018 Asaba | 4×100 m |
| Bronze medal – third place | 2018 Asaba | 100 m |

Joy Udo-Gabriel (born 2 June 1999) is a Nigerian sprinter. She won a bronze medal in the 100 metres at the 2018 African Championships, a bronze medal in the 4 × 100 metres relay at the 2018 Commonwealth Games as well as a gold medal in the 4 x 100 metres relay at the 2019 African Games.

== Competition record ==
| Year | Competition | Venue | Position | Event | Notes |
Representing Nigeria
| 2018 | Commonwealth Games | Gold Coast, Australia | 9th (sf) | 100 m | 11.53 |
| 2018 | Commonwealth Games | Gold Coast, Australia | 3rd | 4 × 100 m relay | 42.75 |
| 2018 | African Championships | Asaba, Nigeria | 3rd | 100 m | 11.58 |
| 2018 | African Championships | Asaba, Nigeria | 1st | 4 × 100 m relay | 43.77 |
| 2019 | World Relays | Yokohama, Japan | 17th (h) | 4 × 100 m relay | 45.07 |
| 2019 | African Games | Rabat, Morocco | 4th | 100 m | 11.44 |
| 2019 | African Games | Rabat, Morocco | 1st | 4 × 100 m relay | 44.16 |
| 2019 | World Championships | Doha, Qatar | 10th (h) | 4 × 100 m relay | 43.05 |
| 2022 | World Championships | Eugene, United States | 4th | 4 × 100 m relay | 42.22 |

== Personal bests ==
- 100 metres – 11.34(+0.3 m/s, yaba tech MOC Grand Prix 2021)
- 200 metres – 23.92 (-0.8 m/s, yabatech MOC Grand Prix 2021)
