= Corinne Humphreys =

English sprinter

Personal information
- Born: 7 November 1991 (age 34) London, United Kingdom
- Education: University of East London
- Height: 1.69 m (5 ft 7 in)
- Weight: 64 kg (141 lb)

Sport
- Sport: Athletics
- Event: 100 metres
- Club: Orion Harriers
- Coached by: Ryan Freckleton; Darren Braithwaite; Christine Bowmaker

Corinne Humphreys (born 7 November 1991 in London) is an English sprinter. She competed in the 100 metres at the 2018 Commonwealth Games reaching the semifinals. In addition, she finished fourth at the 2017 Summer Universiade.

== International competitions ==
| Year | Competition | Venue | Position | Event | Notes |
Representing Great Britain and England
| 2013 | European U23 Championships | Tampere, Finland | 2nd | 4 × 100 m relay | 43.83 |
| 2017 | Universiade | Taipei, Taiwan | 4th | 100 m | 11.49 |
| 2018 | Commonwealth Games | Gold Coast, Australia | 13th (sf) | 100 m | 11.66 |

== Personal bests ==
Outdoor

- 100 metres – 11.39 (+1.2 m/s, Hérouville 2017)
- 200 metres – 24.03 (-1.0 m/s, Lee Valley 2017)

Indoor

- 60 metres – 7.38 (Newham 2016)

== Personal life ==
She is openly gay.
