= Tebogo Mamathu =

South African sprinter (born 1995)

Personal information
- Born: 27 May 1995 (age 31)

Sport
- Sport: Athletics
- Event: 100 metres
Medal record
Women's athletics
Representing South Africa
African Championships
Gold medal – first place	2016 Durban	4×100 m

Tebogo Mamathu (born 27 May 1995) is a South African sprinter. She won a gold medal in the 4 × 100 metres relay at the 2016 African Championships and the silver at the 2019 African Games.

In 2019, she competed in the women's 100 metres event at the 2019 World Athletics Championships held in Doha, Qatar. She did not qualify to compete in the semi-finals.

Mamathu served a four-year ban from 2020 to 2024 for an anti-doping rule violation after testing positive for oxandrolone.

== International competitions ==
Year	Competition	Venue	Position	Event	Notes
Representing South Africa
2013	African Junior Championships	Bambous, Mauritius	1st	100 m	11.98
2013	African Junior Championships	Bambous, Mauritius	2nd	4 × 100 m relay	47.56
2014	World Junior Championships	Eugene, United States	21st (sf)	100 m	12.12
2014	World Junior Championships	Eugene, United States	12th (h)	4 × 100 m relay	46.25
2016	African Championships	Asaba, Nigeria	1st	4 × 100 m relay	43.66
2018	African Championships	Asaba, Nigeria	6th	100 m	11.73
2019	World Relays	Nassau, Bahamas	–	4 × 100 m relay	DNF
2019	African Games	Rabat, Morocco	6th	100 m	11.65
2019	African Games	Rabat, Morocco	2nd	4 × 100 m relay	44.61
2019	World Championships	Doha, Qatar	34th (h)	100 m	11.42

== Personal bests ==
Outdoor

- 100 metres – 11.04 (+1.9 m/s, La Chaux-de-Fonds 2019)
- 200 metres – 23.69 (-0.2 m/s, Polokwane 2016)
