= Aurelie Alcindor =

Mauritian sprinter (born 1994)

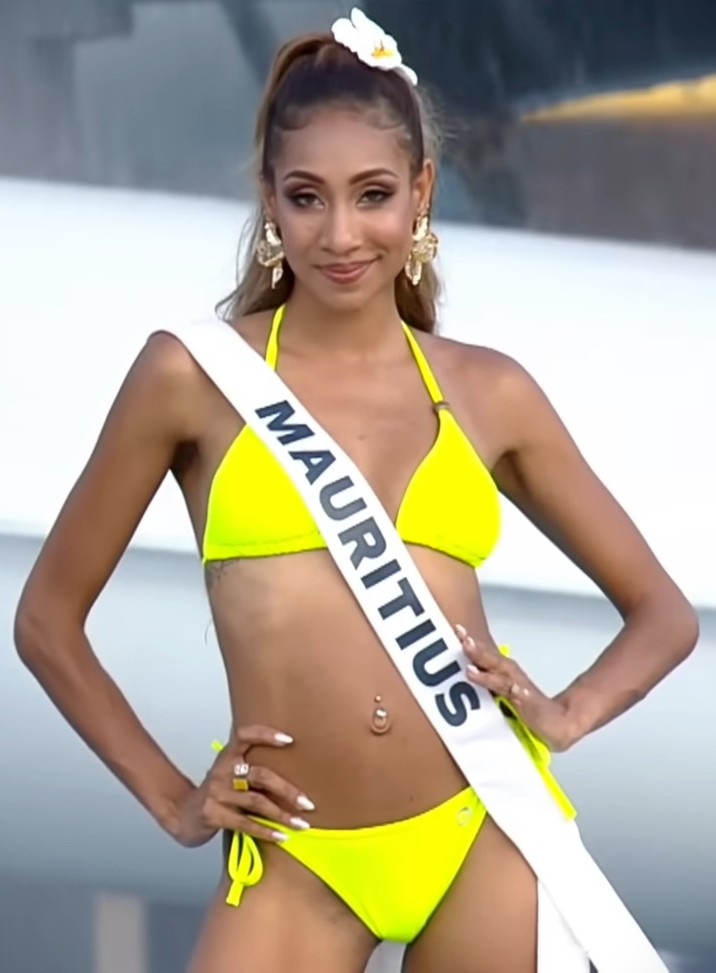
- Alcindor at Miss Universe 2025

Personal information
- Full name: Marie Aurelie Carinne Alcindor
- Born: 20 March 1994 (age 31) Flacq District, Mauritius
- Height: 1.76 m (5 ft 9 in)
- Weight: 58 kg (128 lb)

Sport
- Sport: Athletics
- Event(s): 200 metres, 400 metres

Marie Aurelie Carinne Alcindor (born March 20, 1994) is a Mauritian sprinter and beauty pageant competitor. She competed at the 2016 Summer Olympics in the women's 200 metres race. Her time of 24.55 seconds in this heat did not qualify her for the semifinals. in 2025 , she was appointed as Miss Universe Mauritius and represented her country at the Miss Universe 2025.

== International competitions ==
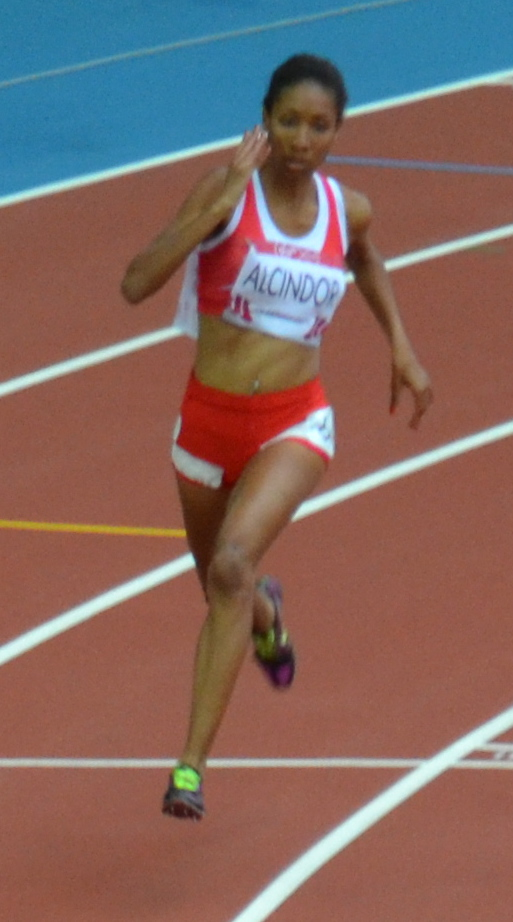
Alcindor racing in 2014

Year	Competition	Venue	Position	Event	Notes
Representing Mauritius
2011	Commonwealth Youth Games	Douglas, Isle of Man	15th (sf)	200 m	26.61
2011	Commonwealth Youth Games	Douglas, Isle of Man	5th	400 m	61.59
2013	African Junior Championships	Bambous, Mauritius	–	400 m	DNF
2013	African Junior Championships	Bambous, Mauritius	–	4 × 100 m relay	DQ
2013	African Junior Championships	Bambous, Mauritius	4th	4 × 400 m relay	4:01.1
2013	Jeux de la Francophonie	Nice, France	6th	4 × 100 m relay	46.55
2014	Commonwealth Games	Glasgow, United Kingdom	37th (h)	400 m	57.39
2015	African Games	Brazzaville, Republic of the Congo	26th (h)	200 m	24.98
2015	African Games	Brazzaville, Republic of the Congo	7th	4 × 100 m relay	46.21
2016	African Championships	Durban, South Africa	12th (sf)	200 m	24.23
2016	African Championships	Durban, South Africa	17th (h)	400 m	54.93
2016	Olympic Games	Rio de Janeiro, Brazil	64th (h)	200 m	24.55
2017	Jeux de la Francophonie	Abidjan, Ivory Coast	14th (h)	200 m	25.25
2017	Jeux de la Francophonie	Abidjan, Ivory Coast	10th (h)	400 m	57.16

== Personal bests ==
- 200 metres – 24.23 (+0.8 m/s, Durban 2016)
- 400 metres – 54.93 (Durban 2016)

Awards and achievements
Preceded by Tania René	Miss Universe Mauritius; 2025	Incumbent
