= Michelle-Lee Ahye =

Sprint athlete from Trinidad and Tobago

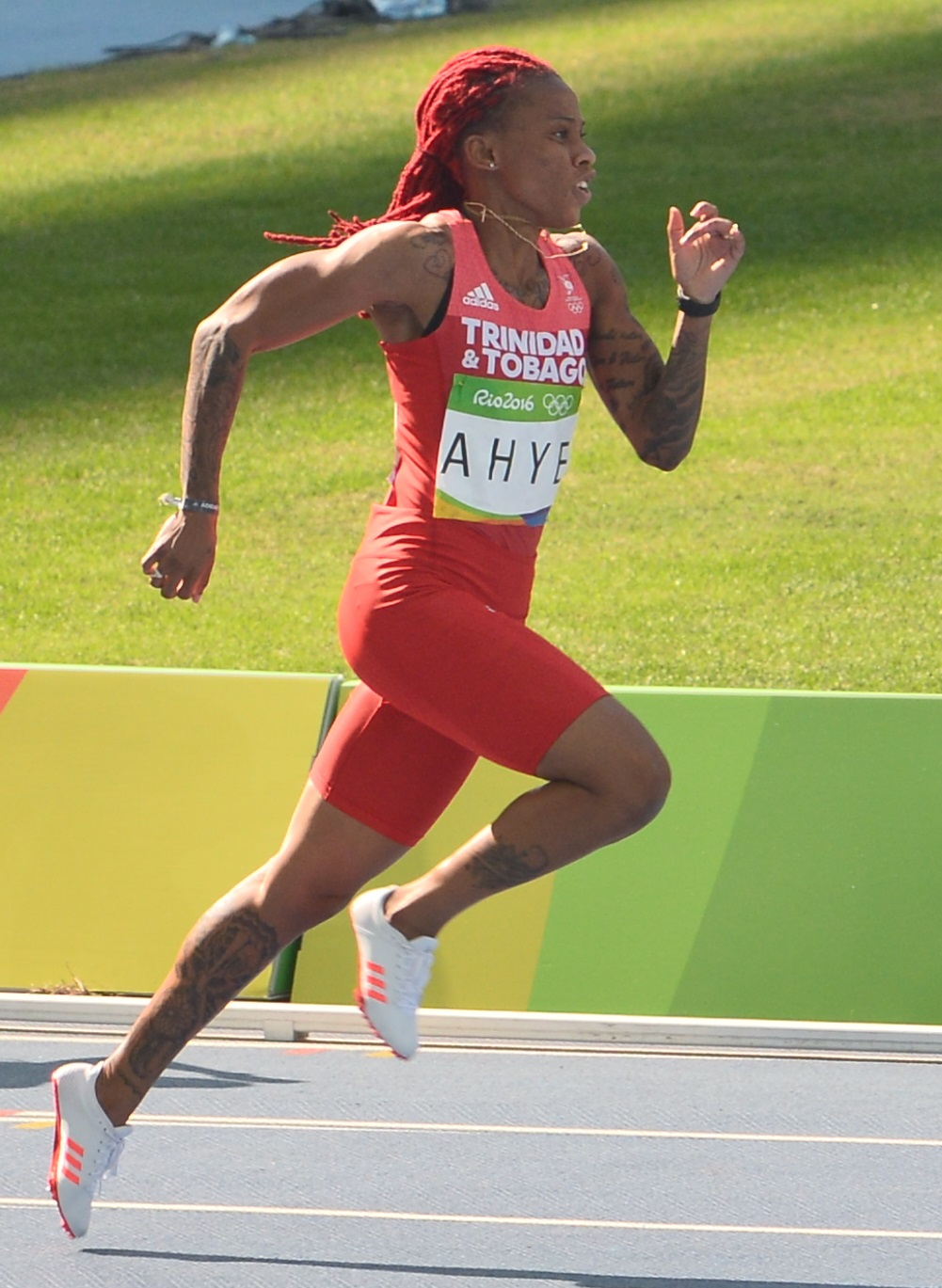
- Michelle-Lee Ahye at the 2016 Summer Olympics

Personal information
- Nationality: Trinidadian
- Born: 10 April 1992 (age 34) Port of Spain, Trinidad and Tobago
- Height: 1.68 m (5 ft 6 in)
- Weight: 59 kg (130 lb)

Sport
- Sport: Athletics
- Events: 100 metres, 200 metres
- Coached by: Matt Kane

Achievements and titles
- Personal bests: 100 m: 10.82 (Port of Spain, Trinidad 2017); 200 m: 22.25 (Rio de Janeiro, Brazil 2016)
Medal record
Women's athletics
Representing Trinidad and Tobago
World Championships
Bronze medal – third place	2015 Beijing	4×100 m relay
Commonwealth Games
Gold medal – first place	2018 Gold Coast	100 m
Bronze medal – third place	2026 Glasgow	4 x 100 m relay
Pan American Games
Silver medal – second place	2019 Lima	100 m
Bronze medal – third place	2023 Santiago	100 m
CAC Championships
Gold medal – first place	2011 Mayagüez	4×100 m relay
NACAC Championships
Bronze medal – third place	2015 Costa Rica	100m
Pan American Junior Championships
Gold medal – first place	2011 Miramar	100 m
CARIFTA Games (Junior)
Gold medal – first place	2010 George Town	100 m
Gold medal – first place	2010 George Town	4×100 m relay
Silver medal – second place	2011 Montego Bay	100 m
Silver medal – second place	2011 Montego Bay	4×100 m relay
CARIFTA Games (Youth)
Gold medal – first place	2007 Providenciales	100 m
Gold medal – first place	2008 Basseterre	100 m
Bronze medal – third place	2006 Les Abymes	4×100 m relay
Representing Americas
Continental Cup
Gold medal – first place	2014 Marrakech	4×100m relay
Silver medal – second place	2014 Marrakech	100 m

Michelle-Lee Raquel Ahye (pronounced ah-ee) (born 10 April 1992) is a Trinidadian sprinter.

== Early life ==
She was born in Port of Spain but lives in the community of Carenage with her mother, Raquel Ahye. She attended Carenage Girls' Government Primary School where her talent of running was discovered, with the help of her Physical Education teacher, Ms. Akowe. She then furthered her career by running in the Milo Games where she proved herself to be one of the best runners in her age group.

== Career ==
She was part of Trinidad and Tobago's squad that finished fourth in the women's 4 × 100 m relay at the 2011 World Championships in Athletics, while running a national record time of 42.50 seconds in the heats.

She competed at the 2012 Summer Olympics.

Ahye won the Trinidad & Tobago National T&F Championships 100m title in both 2013 and 2014. In 2013, Ahye traveled to Moscow, Russia to compete at the IAAF World Outdoor T&F Championships, representing her country of Trinidad & Tobago. In the winter of 2014, Ahye traveled to Sopot, Poland representing Trinidad & Tobago at the IAAF World Indoor T&F Championships in the women's 60m dash. In the finals, Ahye set a new National Record for 60 meters by running 7.10 seconds and placing 6th overall.

In the 2014 outdoor season, Ahye burst onto the worldwide professional Track and Field scene by running at personal best 10.85 in the 100m, winning 12 of 13 races and ranking third in the world by Track and Field News. Ahye placed 1st in the 100m event at the Lausanne Diamond League meet on July 3, 2014, running 10.98. Michelle then traveled to the Glasgow Diamond League meet in Scotland, and defeated the defending 100m Olympic Champion Shelly-Ann Fraser-Pryce of Jamaica by running 11.01 on July 12, 2014. Ahye was also victorious in several other world-class T&F meets in Guadeloupe, Ponce Puerto Rico, Paris France and Switzerland. On Sept 13, 2014 Ahye placed 2nd at the Continental Cup in Marrakech Morocco for the Americas Team.

She was part of the Trinidad and Tobago team that won the bronze medal in the 4 × 100 m at the 2015 World Championships.

She competed at the Olympics again in 2016, reaching the finals of the 100 and 200 m, and helping the Trinidad and Tobado team into the final of the 4 × 100 m relay.

Ahye won the first ever gold medal for a female Trinidadian track and field athlete at the 2018 Commonwealth Games in Gold Coast, Australia.

Ahye is coached by Fritzroy "Eric" Francis in Houston, Texas and managed by Stellar Athletics.

In January 2020, Ahye was issued with a two-year ban backdated to April 2019 for an anti-doping rule violation for whereabouts failures (three missed tests).

In 2024, she competed at the Olympics again.

== Personal life ==
She is openly lesbian. In 2023, she married Canadian sprinter Crystal Emmanuel-Ahye.

== Athletics achievements ==
Information from her World Athletics profile unless otherwise noted.

=== Personal bests ===
Type	Distance	Time (s)	Wind (m/s)	Venue	Date	Notes
Individual events
Indoor	50 metres	6.33	—N/a	Saskatoon, Canada	31 January 2013	NR
Indoor	60 metres	7.09	—N/a	Portland, United States	19 March 2016	NR
Indoor	200 metres sh	23.19	—N/a	College Station, United States	12 December 2015	
Outdoor	100 metres	10.82	+0.9	Port of Spain, Trinidad and Tobago	24 June 2017	NR
Outdoor	200 metres	22.25	+0.8	Rio de Janeiro, Brazil	16 August 2016	NR
Team events
Outdoor	4 × 100 metres relay	42.03	—N/a	Beijing, China	29 August 2015	NR
Outdoor	4 × 200 metres relay	42.03	—N/a	Nassau, The Bahamas	22 April 2017	NR

=== International competitions ===
Representing Trinidad and Tobago
Year	Competition	Venue	Position	Event	Time	Notes
2006	CARIFTA Youth Games	Les Abymes, Guadeloupe	8th	100 m	12.27	
2006	Central American and Caribbean Junior Championships	Port of Spain, Trinidad and Tobago	6th	100 m	12.10	
2007	CARIFTA Youth Games	Providenciales, Turks and Caicos Islands	1st	100 m	11.76	
2007	CARIFTA Youth Games	Providenciales, Turks and Caicos Islands	5th	200 m	24.71	
2007	World Youth Championships	Ostrava, Czech Republic	—	100 m	DNS	
2007	World Youth Championships	Ostrava, Czech Republic	—	200 m	DNS	
2008	CARIFTA Youth Games	Basseterre, Saint Kitts and Nevis	1st	100 m	11.66	
2008	CARIFTA Youth Games	Basseterre, Saint Kitts and Nevis	—	200 m	DNS	
2010	CARIFTA Games	George Town, Cayman Islands	1st	100 m	11.50	
2010	CARIFTA Games	George Town, Cayman Islands	—	200 m	DNS	
2010	CARIFTA Games	George Town, Cayman Islands	1st	4 x 100 m relay	45.06	
2010	Central American and Caribbean Junior Championships	Santo Domingo, Dominican Republic	—	100 m	DNS	
2011	CARIFTA Games	Montego Bay, Jamaica	2nd	100 m	11.44	
2011	CARIFTA Games	Montego Bay, Jamaica	2nd	4 x 100 m relay	45.80	
2011	Central American and Caribbean Championships	Mayagüez, Puerto Rico	1st	4 x 100 m relay	43.47	
2011	Pan American Junior Championships	Miramar, United States	1st	100 m	11.25	
2011	World Championships	Daegu, South Korea	13th (sf)	100 m	11.48	
2011	World Championships	Daegu, South Korea	—	4 x 100 m relay	DQ	41.1
2012	Olympic Games	London, United Kingdom	20th (sf)	100 m	11.32	
2012	Olympic Games	London, United Kingdom	—	4 x 100 m relay	DNF	
2013	Central American and Caribbean Championships	Morelia, Mexico	—	200 m	DQ	TR16.8
2013	Central American and Caribbean Championships	Morelia, Mexico	2nd	4 x 100 m relay	43.67	
2013	World Championships	Moscow, Russia	14th (sf)	100 m	11.33	
2013	World Championships	Moscow, Russia	9th (h)	4 x 100 m relay	43.01	SB
2014	World Indoor Championships	Sopot, Poland	6th	60 m	7.16	
2014	World Relays	Nassau, The Bahamas	3rd	4 x 100 m relay	42.66	
2014	World Relays	Nassau, The Bahamas	—	4 x 200 m relay	DNF	
2014	Commonwealth Games	Glasgow, United Kingdom	—	100 m	DNS	
2014	Continental Cup	Marrakesh, Morocco	2nd	100 m	11.25	
2014	Continental Cup	Marrakesh, Morocco	1st	4 x 100 m relay	42.44	
2015	World Relays	Nassau, The Bahamas	5th	4 x 100 m relay	42.88	
2015	NACAC Championships	San José, Costa Rica	3rd	100 m	11.22	
2015	World Championships	Beijing, China	5th	100 m	10.98	
2015	World Championships	Beijing, China	3rd	4 x 100 m relay	42.03	
2016	World Indoor Championships	Portland, United States	4th	60 m	7.11	
2016	Olympic Games	Rio de Janeiro, Brazil	6th	100 m	10.92	
2016	Olympic Games	Rio de Janeiro, Brazil	6th	200 m	22.34	
2016	Olympic Games	Rio de Janeiro, Brazil	5th	4 x 100 m relay	42.12	SB
2017	World Relays	Nassau, The Bahamas	—	4 x 100 m relay	DNF	
2017	World Relays	Nassau, The Bahamas	4th	4 x 200 m relay	1:32.62 (Note: Time from the heats; she did not run in the final)	
2017	World Championships	London, United Kingdom	6th	100 m	11.01	
2017	World Championships	London, United Kingdom	—	200 m	DNS	
2017	World Championships	London, United Kingdom	6th	4 x 100 m relay	42.62	SB
2018	World Indoor Championships	Birmingham, United Kingdom	6th	60 m	7.13	SB
2018	Commonwealth Games	Gold Coast, Australia	1st	100 m	11.14	
2019	World Relays	Yokohama, Japan	—	4 x 100 m relay	DQ	40.8
2019	Pan American Games	Lima, Peru	—	100 m	DQ	40.8
2019	Pan American Games	Lima, Peru	—	4 x 100 m relay	DQ	40.8
2021	Olympic Games	Tokyo, Japan	9th (sf)	100 m	11.00	
2021	Olympic Games	Tokyo, Japan	15th (h)	4 x 100 m relay	43.62	
2022	World Indoor Championships	Belgrade, Serbia	7th	60 m	7.11	
2022	World Championships	Eugene, United States	18th (sf)	100 m	11.24	
2022	Commonwealth Games	Birmingham, United Kingdom	9th (sf)	100 m	11.29	
2022	Commonwealth Games	Birmingham, United Kingdom	5th	4 x 100 m relay	43.86	
2022	NACAC Championships	Freeport, The Bahamas	5th	100 m	11.23	
2023	World Championships	Budapest, Hungary	16th (sf)	100 m	11.18	
2023	World Championships	Budapest, Hungary	10th (h)	4 x 100 m relay	42.85	SB
2023	Pan American Games	Santiago, Chile	3rd	100 m	11.53	
2024	World Indoor Championships	Glasgow, United Kingdom	24th (h)	60 m	7.26	SB
2024	World Relays	Nassau, The Bahamas	16th (h)	4 x 100 m relay	43.22	
2024	Olympic Games	Paris, France	36th (h)	100 m	11.33	
2025	World Indoor Championships	Nanjing, China	18th (sf)	60 m	7.31	
2026	Commonwealth Games	Glasgow, United Kingdom	10th (sf)	100 m	11.28	SB
2026	Commonwealth Games	Glasgow, United Kingdom	3rd	4 x 100 m relay	43.07	
