= Athletics at the 2016 Summer Olympics – Women's 200 metres =

Women's 200 metres at the Games of the XXXI Olympiad
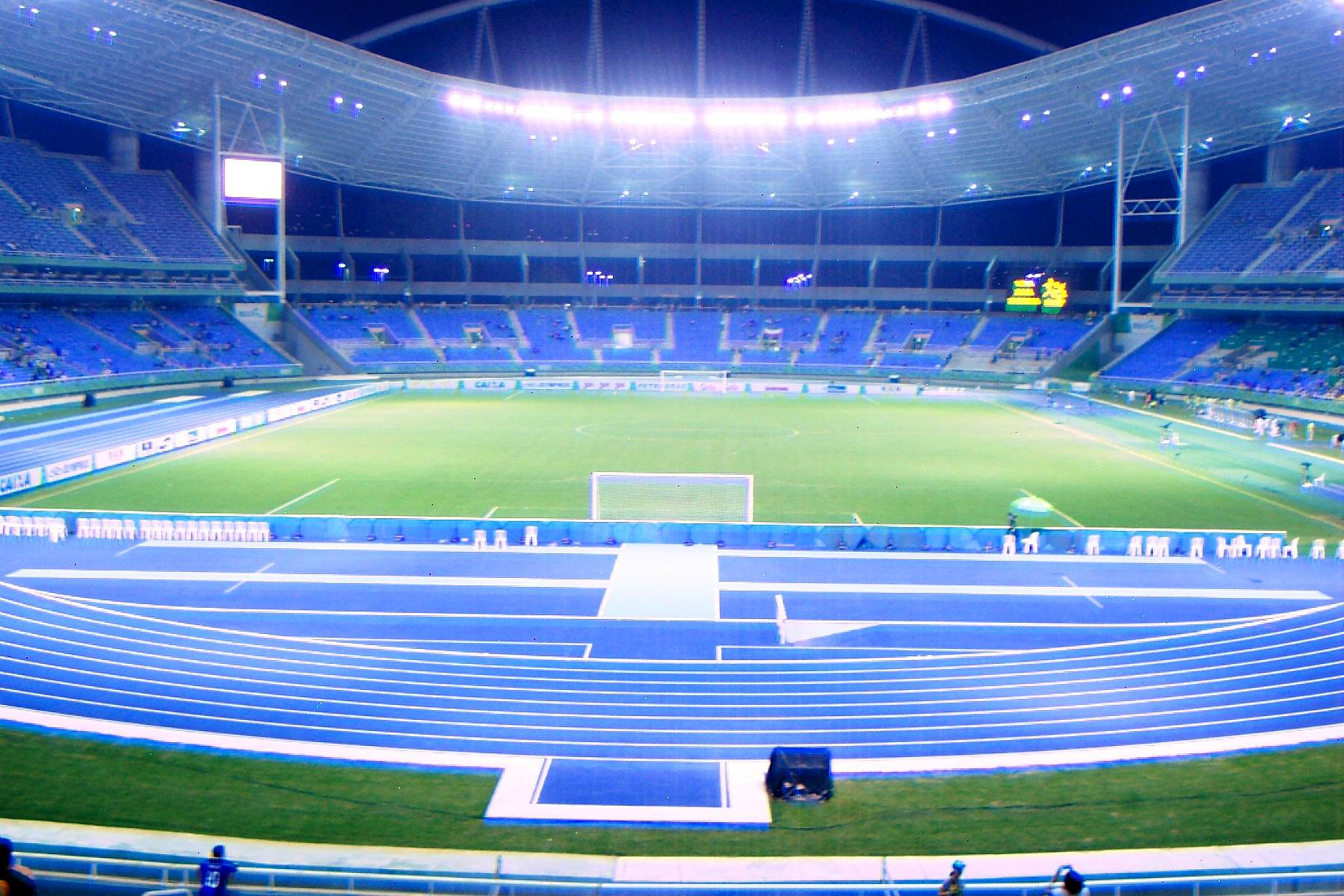
- Interior view of the Estádio Olímpico João Havelange, where the Women's 200m took place.
- Venue: Olympic Stadium
- Dates: 15 August 2016 (heats); 16 August 2016 (semifinals); 17 August 2016 (final)
- Competitors: 72 from 45 nations
- Winning time: 21.78

Medalists
1st place, gold medalist(s)		Elaine Thompson	Jamaica
2nd place, silver medalist(s)		Dafne Schippers	Netherlands
3rd place, bronze medalist(s)		Tori Bowie	United States

Official Video Highlights

The women's 200 metres competition at the 2016 Summer Olympics in Rio de Janeiro, Brazil. The event was held at the Olympic Stadium between 15–17 August. The winning margin was 0.10 seconds. The winner, Elaine Thompson from Jamaica, had the fifth fastest reaction time in the final.

== Summary ==
The fastest entrant in the field was 2015 World Champion Dafne Schippers of the Netherlands at 21.93 seconds for the season. The 2012 Olympic champion Allyson Felix was absent after failing to make the team at the United States Olympic Trials. Tori Bowie won that event and was the only other runner under 22 seconds that year, and also the only one to have beaten Schippers over 200 m that season. The lesser known Deajah Stevens and Jenna Prandini completed the American team (so the 2012 bronze medalist Carmelita Jeter also did not return). The Jamaican team was headed by 2015 World medallists Elaine Thompson and Veronica Campbell-Brown (the latter going for her third Olympic title). The 2012 Olympic runner-up Shelly-Ann Fraser-Pryce did not compete and focused on the Olympic 100 m finals. Trinidad and Tobago's Michelle-Lee Ahye and Dina Asher-Smith of Great Britain were the other top ten ranked athletes to enter the race.

In the semi-final round, both World Championship medalists #3 of all time, Schippers and #5 of all time, Thompson ran in the first heat. Schippers won the race over Thompson, who ran her season best, but Thompson didn't look like she was running all out at the end while Schippers ran just .03 off her season best. They led Deajah Stevens and Dina Asher-Smith to the time qualifiers. Tori Bowie equalled Thompson's 22.13 in the third semi.

In the final, Thompson went out hard, making up the stagger on Ivet Lalova-Collio to her outside in the first 60 metres. She had a one-metre lead over Schippers before the end of the turn. Tori Bowie stumbled out of the blocks and was another metre back in a battle for fifth place with Dina Asher-Smith. Schippers started to gain on Thompson towards the line but did not catch the winner. Two metres behind, Bowie won the bronze medal having overtaken Asher-Smith, Michelle-Lee Ahye and 10 metres before the finish line Marie Josée Ta Lou.

The following evening the medals were presented by HM King Willem-Alexander of the Netherlands, IOC honorary member, Kenya and Sylvia Barlag, Council Member of the IAAF.

== Format ==
The women's 200 m competition consisted of three rounds: a round one heats stage with nine races, three semifinal races, and a single final. Each race featured eight athletes. The top two in each heat progressed to the semifinals, as did the six fastest non-qualifiers. The top two finishers in each of the three semifinals qualified for the final with the two fastest non-qualifiers.

== Records ==
Prior to the competition, the existing World and Olympic records were as follows.

World record	Florence Griffith Joyner (USA)	21.34	Seoul, Korea	29 September 1988
Olympic record	Florence Griffith Joyner (USA)	21.34	Seoul, Korea	29 September 1988
2016 World leading	Dafne Schippers (NED)	21.93	Oslo, Norway	9 June 2016

The following national records were established during the competition:

Country	Athlete	Round	Time	Notes
Maldives	Afa Ismail (MDV)	Heats	24.96 s	
Ivory Coast	Marie Josée Ta Lou (CIV)	Final	22.21 s	

== Schedule ==
All times are Brasilia Time (UTC-3)

Date	Time	Round
Monday, 15 August 2016	9:35	Heats
Tuesday, 16 August 2016	22:00	Semifinals
Wednesday, 17 August 2016	22:30	Finals

== Results ==
=== Heats ===
Qualification rule: first 2 of each heat (Q) plus the 6 fastest times (q) qualified.

==== Heat 1 ====
Rank	Lane	Athlete	Nationality	Reaction	Time	Notes
1	4	Dafne Schippers	Netherlands	0.145	22.51	Q
2	7	Nataliya Pohrebnyak	Ukraine	0.134	22.64	Q
3	6	Crystal Emmanuel	Canada	0.144	22.80	q, PB
4	5	Anna Kiełbasińska	Poland	0.155	22.95	SB
5	2	Reyare Thomas	Trinidad and Tobago	0.202	22.97	
6	1	Maja Mihalinec	Slovenia	0.132	23.38	
7	3	Olivia Borlée	Belgium	0.170	23.53	
8	8	Afa Ismail	Maldives	0.193	24.96	NR
				Wind: +0.5 m/s		

==== Heat 2 ====
Rank	Lane	Athlete	Nationality	Reaction	Time	Notes
1	1	Jenna Prandini	United States	0.163	22.62	Q
2	7	Lisa Mayer	Germany	0.172	22.86	Q, PB
3	6	Tynia Gaither	Bahamas	0.160	22.90	q
4	5	Ángela Tenorio	Ecuador	0.160	22.94	q, SB
5	3	Celiangeli Morales	Puerto Rico	0.164	23.00	PB
6	2	Gloria Hooper	Italy	0.167	23.05	
7	8	Mariely Sánchez	Dominican Republic	0.159	23.39	
8	4	Cynthia Bolingo	Belgium	0.188	23.98	
				Wind: +0.8 m/s		

==== Heat 3 ====
Rank	Lane	Athlete	Nationality	Reaction	Time	Notes
1	3	Michelle-Lee Ahye	Trinidad and Tobago	0.170	22.50	Q
2	5	Simone Facey	Jamaica	0.164	22.78	Q
3	8	Kauiza Venancio	Brazil	0.187	23.06	
4	4	Alyssa Conley	South Africa	0.114	23.17	
5	1	Isidora Jiménez	Chile	0.132	23.29	
6	2	Estela García	Spain	0.137	23.43	
7	7	Nataliya Strohova	Ukraine	0.164	23.69	
8	6	Yelena Ryabova	Turkmenistan	0.170	25.45	
				Wind: +0.6 m/s		

==== Heat 4 ====
Rank	Lane	Athlete	Nationality	Reaction	Time	Notes
1	7	Marie Josée Ta Lou	Ivory Coast	0.141	22.31	Q, PB
2	4	Elaine Thompson	Jamaica	0.177	22.63	Q
3	3	Gina Lückenkemper	Germany	0.207	22.80	q
4	2	Maria Belimpasaki	Greece	0.183	23.19	
5	6	Justine Palframan	South Africa	0.151	23.33	
6	1	Janet Amponsah	Ghana	0.157	23.67	
7	8	Diana Khubeseryan	Armenia	0.146	25.16	
8	5	Margret Hassan	South Sudan	0.263	26.99	PB
				Wind: +0.6 m/s		

==== Heat 5 ====
Rank	Lane	Athlete	Nationality	Reaction	Time	Notes
1	4	Blessing Okagbare	Nigeria	0.158	22.71	Q
2	7	Dina Asher-Smith	Great Britain	0.164	22.77	Q
3	1	Anthonique Strachan	Bahamas	0.161	22.96	SB
4	8	Tessa van Schagen	Netherlands	0.189	23.41	
5	2	Gina Bass	The Gambia	0.179	23.43	
6	6	Srabani Nanda	India	0.150	23.58	
7	5	Aurelie Alcindor	Mauritius	0.201	24.55	
8	3	Gayane Chiloyan	Armenia	0.179	25.03	
				Wind: -0.1 m/s		

==== Heat 6 ====
Rank	Lane	Athlete	Nationality	Reaction	Time	Notes
1	7	Deajah Stevens	United States	0.160	22.45	Q
2	4	Nercely Soto	Venezuela	0.196	22.89	Q, SB
3	2	Jamile Samuel	Netherlands	0.159	23.04	
4	5	Ramona Papaioannou	Cyprus	0.140	23.10	PB
5	1	Yelyzaveta Bryzhina	Ukraine	0.178	23.28	
6	8	Nigina Sharipova	Uzbekistan	0.140	23.33	
7	6	Viktoriya Zyabkina	Kazakhstan	0.167	23.34	
8	3	Najima Parveen	Pakistan	0.183	26.11	
				Wind: 0.0 m/s		

==== Heat 7 ====
Rank	Lane	Athlete	Nationality	Reaction	Time	Notes
1	6	Ivet Lalova-Collio	Bulgaria	0.136	22.61	Q
2	3	Ella Nelson	Australia	0.155	22.66	Q
3	4	Jodie Williams	Great Britain	0.135	22.69	q, SB
4	1	Lorène Bazolo	Portugal	0.166	23.01	PB
5	8	Chisato Fukushima	Japan	0.125	23.21	
6	5	LaVerne Jones-Ferrette	Virgin Islands	0.127	23.35	
7	2	Vitória Cristina Rosa	Brazil	0.191	23.35	SB
8	7	Sheniqua Ferguson	Bahamas	0.153	23.62	
				Wind: +0.5 m/s		

==== Heat 8 ====
Rank	Lane	Athlete	Nationality	Reaction	Time	Notes
1	8	Tori Bowie	United States	0.145	22.47	Q
2	6	Murielle Ahouré	Ivory Coast	0.156	22.52	Q, SB
3	3	Mujinga Kambundji	Switzerland	0.139	22.78	q, SB
4	1	Nadine Gonska	Germany	0.129	23.03	
5	5	Eleni Artymata	Cyprus	0.166	23.27	
6	2	Arialis Gandulla	Cuba	0.149	23.41	
7	7	Brenessa Thompson	Guyana	0.155	23.65	
8	4	Maizurah Abdul Rahim	Brunei	0.173	28.02	PB
				Wind: +0.1 m/s		

==== Heat 9 ====
Video on YouTube Official Video Highlights

Rank	Lane	Athlete	Nationality	Reaction	Time	Notes
1	3	Edidiong Odiong	Bahrain	0.156	22.74	Q, PB, AJR
2	1	Semoy Hackett	Trinidad and Tobago	0.162	22.78	Q
3	6	Veronica Campbell-Brown	Jamaica	0.170	22.97	
4	8	Olga Safronova	Kazakhstan	0.144	23.29	
5	7	Ashley Kelly	British Virgin Islands	0.191	23.61	
6	4	Tameka Williams	Saint Kitts and Nevis	0.160	23.61	
7	2	Sabina Veit	Slovenia	0.161	23.75	
8	5	Kristina Pronzhenko	Tajikistan	0.213	25.53	
				Wind: +0.6 m/s		

=== Semifinal ===
Qualification rules: First 2 in each heat (Q) and the next 2 fastest (q) advance to the Final.

==== Semifinal 1 ====
Rank	Lane	Athlete	Nationality	Reaction	Time	Notes
1	3	Dafne Schippers	Netherlands	0.139	21.96	Q
2	4	Elaine Thompson	Jamaica	0.164	22.13	Q, SB
3	5	Deajah Stevens	United States	0.170	22.38	q
4	7	Dina Asher-Smith	Great Britain	0.143	22.49	q
5	6	Blessing Okagbare	Nigeria	0.179	22.69	
6	2	Mujinga Kambundji	Switzerland	0.121	22.83	
7	8	Lisa Mayer	Germany	0.162	22.90	
8	1	Tynia Gaither	Bahamas	0.149	23.45	
				Wind: +0.1 m/s		

==== Semifinal 2 ====
Rank	Lane	Athlete	Nationality	Reaction	Time	Notes
1	3	Marie Josée Ta Lou	Ivory Coast	0.156	22.28	Q, PB
2	4	Ivet Lalova-Collio	Bulgaria	0.127	22.42	Q, SB
3	7	Ella Nelson	Australia	0.165	22.50	PB
4	6	Jenna Prandini	United States	0.196	22.55	
5	5	Nataliya Pohrebnyak	Ukraine	0.163	22.81	
6	8	Semoy Hackett	Trinidad and Tobago	0.240	22.94	
7	2	Ángela Tenorio	Ecuador	0.160	22.99	
8	1	Jodie Williams	Great Britain	0.173	22.99	
				Wind: +0.1 m/s		

==== Semifinal 3 ====
Rank	Lane	Athlete	Nationality	Reaction	Time	Notes
1	4	Tori Bowie	United States	0.145	22.13	Q
2	6	Michelle-Lee Ahye	Trinidad and Tobago	0.153	22.25	Q
3	8	Simone Facey	Jamaica	0.158	22.57	SB
4	5	Murielle Ahouré	Ivory Coast	0.144	22.59	
5	2	Gina Lückenkemper	Germany	0.196	22.73	
6	3	Edidiong Odiong	Bahrain	0.156	22.84	
7	7	Nercely Soto	Venezuela	0.174	22.88	SB
8	1	Crystal Emmanuel	Canada	0.149	23.05	
				Wind: +0.8 m/s		

=== Final ===
Rank	Lane	Athlete	Nationality	Reaction	Time	Notes
1st place, gold medalist(s)	6	Elaine Thompson	Jamaica	0.152	21.78	WL
2nd place, silver medalist(s)	4	Dafne Schippers	Netherlands	0.141	21.88	SB
3rd place, bronze medalist(s)	5	Tori Bowie	United States	0.143	22.15	
4	3	Marie Josée Ta Lou	Ivory Coast	0.153	22.21	NR
5	2	Dina Asher-Smith	Great Britain	0.135	22.31	SB
6	7	Michelle-Lee Ahye	Trinidad and Tobago	0.158	22.34	
7	1	Deajah Stevens	United States	0.171	22.65	
8	8	Ivet Lalova-Collio	Bulgaria	0.104	22.69	
				Wind: -0.1 m/s		
