= Athletics at the 2019 African Games – Women's 100 metres =

The women's 100 metres event at the 2019 African Games was held on 26 and 27 August in Rabat.

== Medalists ==
Gold	Silver	Bronze
Marie-Josée Ta Lou; Ivory Coast	Gina Bass; Gambia	Basant Hemida; Egypt

== Results ==
=== Heats ===
Qualification: First 3 in each heat (Q) and the next 6 fastest (q) advanced to the semifinals.

Wind:
Heat 1: -0.1 m/s, Heat 2: -0.1 m/s, Heat 3: +0.2 m/s, Heat 4: +0.2 m/s, Heat 5: 0.0 m/s, Heat 6: -0.2 m/s

Rank	Heat	Name	Nationality	Time	Notes
1	5	Gina Bass	Gambia	11.38	Q
2	4	Joy Udo-Gabriel	Nigeria	11.46	Q
3	2	Marie-Josée Ta Lou	Ivory Coast	11.48	Q
4	3	Blessing Okagbare	Nigeria	11.53	Q
5	1	Tebogo Mamathu	South Africa	11.55	Q
6	4	Natacha Ngoye Akamabi	Republic of the Congo	11.57	Q
7	5	Alphonsus Aniekeme	Nigeria	11.67	Q
8	3	Maximilla Imali	Kenya	11.73	Q
9	4	Hellen Makumba	Zambia	11.75	Q
10	1	Persis William-Mensah	Ghana	11.76	Q
11	3	Mariam Bance	Burkina Faso	11.76	Q
12	3	Claudine Njarasoa	Madagascar	11.82	q
13	5	Gemma Acheampong	Ghana	11.83	Q
14	2	Aminatou Seyni	Niger	11.84	Q
15	6	Basant Hemida	Egypt	11.86	Q
16	2	Jacent Nyamahunge	Uganda	11.86	Q
17	4	Fatou Sanneh	Gambia	11.88	q
18	1	Phumlile Ndzinisa	Eswatini	11.89	Q
19	2	Ndeye Arame	Senegal	11.94	q
20	5	Tsaone Sebele	Botswana	11.97	q
21	6	Jolene Jacobs	Namibia	12.00	Q
22	5	N'da Akissi Bledja Kouassi	Ivory Coast	12.07	q
23	1	Christelle Roxane Ore	Ivory Coast	12.08	q
24	2	Agness Mazala	Zambia	12.15	
25	6	Gorete Semedo	São Tomé and Príncipe	12.16	Q
26	1	Agate de Sousa	São Tomé and Príncipe	12.20	
27	4	Juliette Bouley	Togo	12.27	
28	4	Fatoumata Koala	Burkina Faso	12.29	
29	6	Fatmata Awolo	Sierra Leone	12.31	
30	1	Judith Koumedzina	Togo	12.34	
31	1	Pierrick Moulin	Gabon	12.38	
32	6	Prenam Pesse	Togo	12.41	
33	5	Eveline Sanches	Cape Verde	12.50	
34	3	Globine Mayova	Namibia	12.54	
35	3	Françoise Kumi	Democratic Republic of the Congo	12.56	
36	2	Elma Sesay	Sierra Leone	12.62	
36	6	Eunice Kadogo	Kenya	12.68	
37	4	Lucia Lucia	South Sudan	12.69	
38	2	Worke Kumalo	Ethiopia	12.72	
39	6	Makoura Keita	Guinea	12.75	
40	6	Suwilanji Mpondela	Zambia	12.78	
41	5	Abbangah Brahim Zenaba	Chad	12.87	
42	4	Abissie Kebede	Ethiopia	13.02	
	3	Hadel Aboud	Libya	DQ	
	2	Marcelle Cecilia Bouele Bondo	Republic of the Congo	DNS	
	3	Jemina Robinei	Central African Republic	DNS	

=== Semifinals ===
Qualification: First 2 in each semifinal (Q) and the next 2 fastest (q) advanced to the final.

Wind:
Heat 1: -0.9 m/s, Heat 2: -1.1 m/s, Heat 3: -0.4 m/s

Rank	Heat	Name	Nationality	Time	Notes
1	1	Marie-Josée Ta Lou	Ivory Coast	11.36	Q
1	2	Gina Bass	Gambia	11.36	Q, =NR
3	2	Basant Hemida	Egypt	11.41	Q
4	3	Joy Udo-Gabriel	Nigeria	11.47	Q
5	3	Tebogo Mamathu	South Africa	11.63	Q
6	1	Maximilla Imali	Kenya	11.71	Q
7	2	Natacha Ngoye Akamabi	Republic of the Congo	11.71	q
8	2	Alphonsus Aniekeme	Nigeria	11.82	q
9	1	Hellen Makumba	Zambia	11.83	
10	3	Fatou Sanneh	Gambia	11.84	
11	3	Mariam Bance	Burkina Faso	11.85	
12	1	Tsaone Sebele	Botswana	11.85	
13	1	Jacent Nyamahunge	Uganda	11.93	
13	2	Gemma Acheampong	Ghana	11.93	
13	3	Aminatou Seyni	Niger	11.93	
16	1	Ndeye Arame	Senegal	11.99	
17	3	Phumlile Ndzinisa	Eswatini	12.01	
18	1	Persis William-Mensah	Ghana	12.02	
19	3	Jolene Jacobs	Namibia	12.03	
20	2	Claudine Njarasoa	Madagascar	12.05	
21	3	N'da Akissi Bledja Kouassi	Ivory Coast	12.10	
22	2	Christelle Roxane Ore	Ivory Coast	12.86	
	1	Blessing Okagbare	Nigeria	DQ	
	2	Gorete Semedo	São Tomé and Príncipe	DQ	

=== Final ===
Wind: -1.2 m/s

Rank	Lane	Name	Nationality	Time	Notes
1st place, gold medalist(s)	5	Marie-Josée Ta Lou	Ivory Coast	11.09	
2nd place, silver medalist(s)	6	Gina Bass	Gambia	11.13	NR
3rd place, bronze medalist(s)	7	Basant Hemida	Egypt	11.31	NR
4	4	Joy Udo-Gabriel	Nigeria	11.44	
5	3	Natacha Ngoye Akamabi	Republic of the Congo	11.54	
6	9	Tebogo Mamathu	South Africa	11.65	
7	8	Maximilla Imali	Kenya	11.69	
8	2	Alphonsus Aniekeme	Nigeria	11.78	
