= Marie Josée Ta Lou-Smith =

Ivorian sprinter (born 1988)

Marie-Josée Ta Lou-Smith
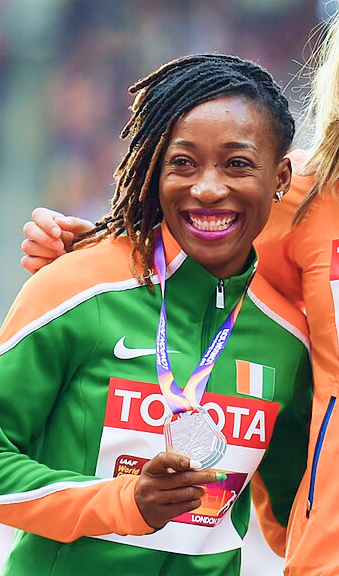
- Ta Lou at the 2017 World Championships

Personal information
- Full name: Gonezie Marie Josée Dominique Ta Lou-Smith
- Nationality: Ivorian
- Born: 18 November 1988 (age 37) Bouaflé, Ivory Coast
- Height: 1.59 m (5 ft 3 in)
- Weight: 50 kg (110 lb)

Sport
- Country: Ivory Coast
- Sport: Athletics
- Event: Sprint
- Club: Stade Français
- Coached by: Anthony Koffi

Achievements and titles
- Olympic finals: 2016; 100 m, 4th 200 m, 4th 2020; 100 m, 4th 200 m, 5th 2024; 100 m, 8th
- Personal bests: 60 m: 7.02 (Düsseldorf 2019); 100 m: 10.72 AR (Monaco 2022); 150 m: 16.99 NBP (Ostrava 2020); 200 m: 22.08 NR (London 2017)
Medal record
Women's athletics
Representing Ivory Coast
World Championships
Silver medal – second place	2017 London	100 m
Silver medal – second place	2017 London	200 m
Bronze medal – third place	2019 Doha	100 m
World Indoor Championships
Silver medal – second place	2018 Birmingham	60 m
African Championships
Gold medal – first place	2016 Durban	200 m
Gold medal – first place	2018 Asaba	100 m
Gold medal – first place	2018 Asaba	200 m
Silver medal – second place	2014 Marrakesh	200 m
Silver medal – second place	2014 Marrakesh	4×100 m
Silver medal – second place	2018 Asaba	4×100 m
Bronze medal – third place	2012 Porto-Novo	200 m
Bronze medal – third place	2012 Porto-Novo	4×100 m
Bronze medal – third place	2014 Marrakesh	100 m
Bronze medal – third place	2016 Durban	100 m
Bronze medal – third place	2016 Durban	4×100 m
All-Africa Games
Gold medal – first place	2015 Brazzaville	100 m
Gold medal – first place	2015 Brazzaville	200 m
Gold medal – first place	2019 Rabat	100 m
Bronze medal – third place	2015 Brazzaville	4 × 100 m
Bronze medal – third place	2019 Rabat	200 m
Representing Africa
Continental Cup
Gold medal – first place	2018 Ostrava	100 m

Gonezie Marie Josée Dominique Ta Lou-Smith (née Ta Lou) (born 18 November 1988) is an Ivorian sprinter competing in the 100 metres and 200 metres. She is a two-time World Championships medalist and is the African record holder in the 100 m.

After initially taking an interest in association football, Ta Lou-Smith made a successful switch to sprinting in 2008. She made a break through at the 2015 World Championships, making the semi-finals in both the 100 m and 200 m and setting personal bests in both events. At the 2016 Summer Olympics, she placed fourth in both of her specialist events, setting five personal bests throughout the Games. She improved the next year to win her first global medal at the 2017 World Championships, winning silver in the 100 m. She also won bronze in the same event at the 2019 World Championships. At the 2020 Summer Olympics, she finished fourth in the 100 m and fifth in the 200 m. One of the most reliable and consistent sprinters, Ta Lou-Smith has also made major global finals in 2022, 2023, 2024 and 2025. Indoors, Ta Lou-Smith won the silver medal in the 60 m at the 2018 World Indoor Championships.

In continental competitions, Ta Lou-Smith has been very successful, winning three gold medals at the African Athletics Championships, in the 200 m in 2016 and 2018, and in the 100 m also in 2018. Meanwhile, at the All-Africa Games, she won gold in the 100 m and 200 m in 2015 and in the 100 m in 2019.

Ta Lou-Smith's 100 m personal best of 10.72 s makes her the tenth-fastest woman and fastest African woman of all time. She also has the Ivorian record in the 200 m and the African record in the rarely-run straight 150 m.

== Career ==
=== 2007–2009: Early career ===
Ta Lou's first passion was association football before her elder brother convinced her to change to sprinting in 2008. She trained in Paris and studied medicine at the Université d'Abobo-Adjamé in Abidjan.

Ta Lou played football at school in the neighbourhood of Koumassi, a suburb of Abidjan. Her brother objected when a women's team tried to get her to join them, fearing that she would become a tomboy. Friends of his suggested that if his sister enjoyed sports, she should take up athletics, as she was already regularly beating the boys in her class in sprints. By coincidence, Florence Olonade, the Ivory Coast 100 m champion in 1988, was a classmate of Ta Lou's mother and invited Ta Lou for a trial. She beat the girls who trained under Olonade in a 200 m race, even though she was running barefoot and had no time to prepare.

By the end of June 2007, she was part of the Ivorian 4 × 100 m team that won bronze at the West African Championships in Cotonou, Benin. She then made the Ivorian team for the African Junior Championships in Ouagadougou, Burkina Faso. She finished last in her 100 m heat with a time of 13.21 seconds. In September 2007, she won her first national 100 m title in a time of 12.9 seconds.

In 2008, she won both the 100 metres and 200 metres at the National Championships. She repeated this feat at the 2009 National Championships. That year, she finished seventh in the 200 metre race at the 2009 West African Championships in Porto-Novo, Benin, with a time of 25.67 despite a 1.8 m/s headwind. Her coach, Florence Onolade, made the sacrifice of sending the athlete he saw as promising to a coach with more experience, Jeannot Kouamé so that Ta Lou could progress further.

=== 2010–2013: Early rise ===
In 2010, Ta Lou was second at her international debut in the 100 metres at the Gabriel Tiacoh meet in Abidjan with a time of 12.10 seconds. In June 2010, she again won both the 100 metres and 200 metres at the national championships. She then competed in her first senior African Championships, finishing sixth in her 100 m semi-final in a time of 12.16 seconds. She also ran in the 200 m heats. She undertook a scholarship offered to her by the Ivory Coast Athletics Federation and re-located to Shanghai University with her teammate Wilfried Koffi Hua.

In August 2011, she took part in the World University Games in Shenzhen, China, in both the 100 metre and 200 metre races. She lowered her personal bests to 11.87 seconds and 24.17 seconds, respectively. She was also a double finalist at the All-Africa Games in Mozambique. Additionally, she set a new 100 m personal best of 11.56 seconds in the heats.

In 2012, she won two bronze medals at the African Championships in Porto-Novo, Benin, in the 200 m (23.44) and the 4 × 100 m. She was also fourth in the individual 100 metre race. She set a new personal best in the semi-finals of the 200 m, 23.26 seconds.

=== 2013–2015: Initial breakthrough ===
In 2013, Ta Lou competed in the World University Games in Kazan in July, reaching the semi-final in the 100 m and finishing eighth in the final of the 200 m in a time of 23.63. After struggling to combine her athletics training and her studies in Shanghai, she decided to return to Ivory Coast.

Her ex-coaches, Onolade and Kouamé, helped her try to enroll at one of the West African High Performance Training Centres in Lomé or Dakar. A space opened in the autumn and Ta Lou secured her place in December 2013. At the 2014 Gabriel Tiacoh meet, she finished second in the 100 m with a new personal best of 11.24 seconds. In August 2014, she competed at the African Championships in Marrakesh. She won bronze in the 100 m and silver in the 200 m, breaking her personal best with a time of 22.87 seconds, her first run under 23 seconds.

Following further good performances in 2014, she was awarded an Olympic Solidarity scholarship to prepare for the 2016 Olympic Games. In her first Diamond League appearance in Paris on 4 July 2015, Ta Lou improved her 100 m personal best to 11.06 seconds. At the 2015 World Championships in Beijing, she made the semi-finals of both the 100 m and 200 m, setting personal bests of 11.04 s and 22.56 s, respectively. At the 2015 African Games in Brazzaville, Ta Lou completed a sprint double by winning both the 100 m and 200 m. In the 100 m, she ran a new personal best with a new Games record time of 11.02. She was named Best Female Athlete of the All-Africa Games and honoured at the ANOC Awards in Washington in November.

=== 2016–2018: Worldwide success and world medals ===
In 2016, Ta Lou competed at the World Indoor Championships, finishing seventh in the final of the 60 m. At the African Championships in Durban, Ta Lou won gold in the 200 m and took bronzes in the 100 m and 4 × 100 m relay. She improved her 100 m personal best to 10.96 s in winning her heat at the London Diamond League on 23 July, her first time under the 11-second barrier. She went onto win the final in the same time.

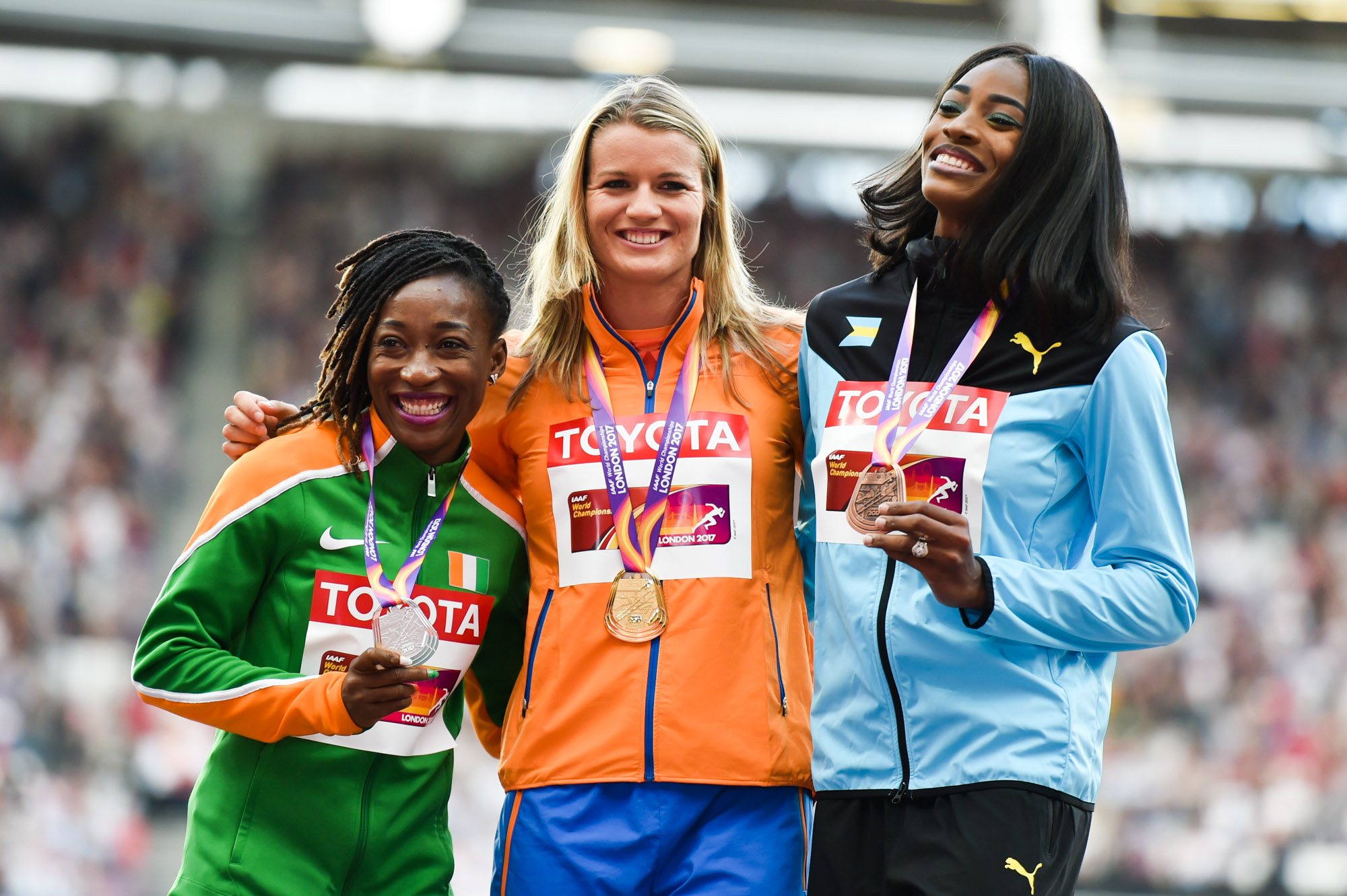
Ta Lou with her 200 m silver medal at the 2017 World Athletics Championships.

At the 2016 Summer Olympics, Ta Lou ran a new personal best of 10.94 s in her 100 m semi-final to progress to the final as a non-automatic qualifier. In the final, she finished fourth in another personal best of 10.86 s, losing out on a medal by 0.007 s to Shelly-Ann Fraser-Pryce. In the 200 m, Ta Lou won her semi-final in a new personal best of 22.28 s, improving on the mark of 22.31 s she had set in the heats, to make the final. The next day, in the final, Ta Lou once again finished fourth in another new personal best of 22.21 s.

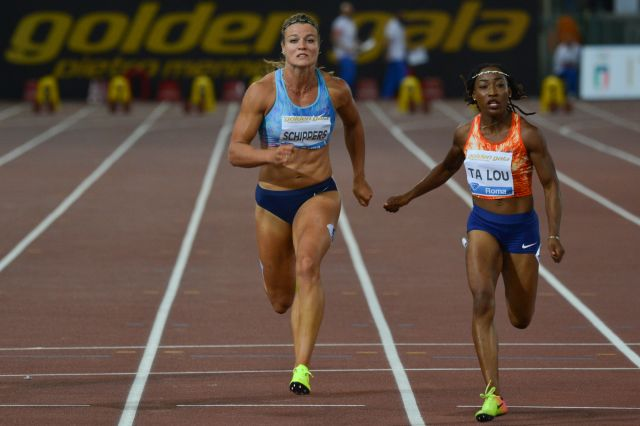
Ta Lou competing in the 100 m against Dafne Schippers at the 2017 Golden Gala

Ta Lou enjoyed a strong start to her 2017 season by placing third over 200 m at the Doha Diamond League in 22.77 s and placing third again over 100 m at the Shanghai Diamond League in 11.07 s. She continued her good form by winning the 200 m at the Golden Spike in Ostrava in 22.44 s on 28 June. At the Athletissima in Lausanne on 6 July, Ta Lou set a new Ivorian national record over 200 m of 22.16 s. She won over 200 m again on 21 July, at the Monaco Diamond League, in 22.25 s. She competed at the 2017 Francophone Games in July, winning the 4 × 100 m relay in 44.22 s.

At the 2017 World Championships in London, Ta Lou won silver in the 100 m, narrowly finishing behind Tori Bowie by 0.01 s. Ta Lou also made the final in the 200 m, where she finished second behind Dafne Schippers, improving her own national record to 22.08 s. At the Diamond League Finals, in Zurich and Brussels, Ta Lou finished third in the 200 m in 22.09 m, 0.01 s outside of her national record. She also finished second in the 100 m, in a time of 10.93 s, losing out by 0.01 s to Elaine Thompson-Herah.

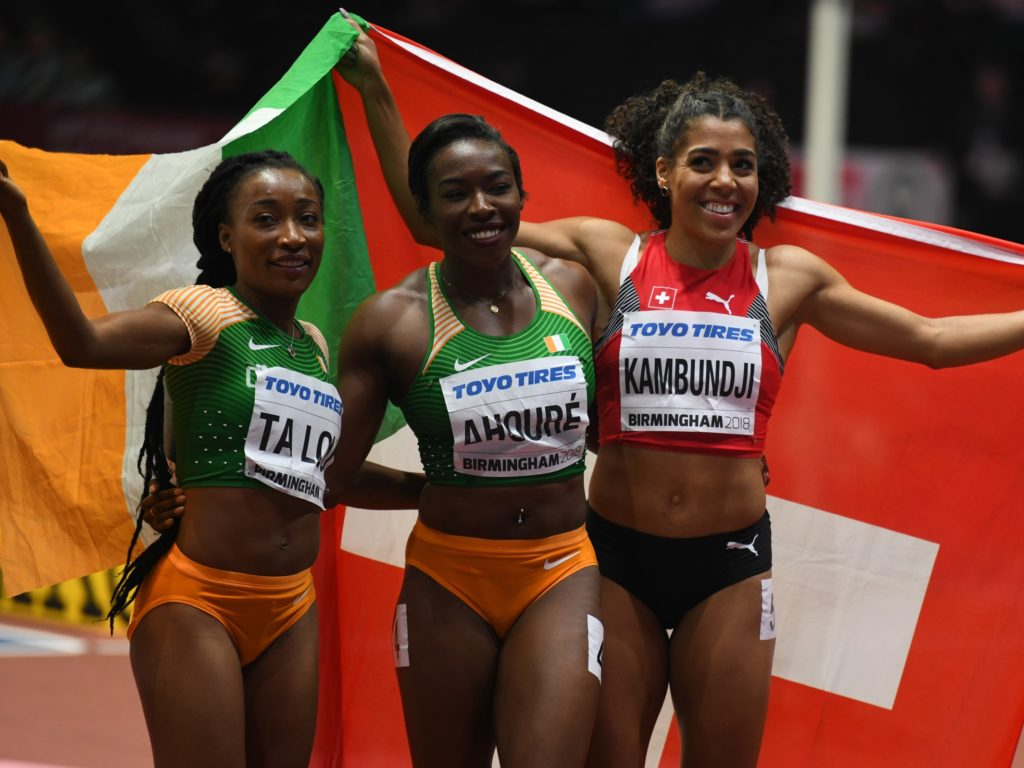
Ta Lou after winning silver in the 60 m at the World Indoor Championships

In 2018, Ta Lou won silver in the 60 m at the World Indoor Championships in Birmingham, completing an Ivorian 1–2 behind Murielle Ahouré in a new personal best of 7.05 s. In her first race of the outdoor season on 4 May, Ta Lou won the 100 m at the Doha Diamond League in a new personal best of 10.85 s. She followed it up by winning the 100 m at the Prefontaine Classic on 26 May, in a time of 10.85 s, beating her compatriot Ahouré into second. She also picked up 100 m wins at the Athletissima on 5 July in 10.90 s and at the Herculis in Monaco on 20 July in 10.89 s.

At the 2018 African Athletics Championships held in Asaba, Ta Lou won gold in both the 100 m and 200 m in 11.15 s and 22.50 s, respectively. At the 2018 Diamond League Final in Zurich, she finished third in the 100 m in 11.10 s. In September, Ta Lou competed at the IAAF Continental Cup, winning gold in the 100 m in 11.14 s and finishing third in the 200 m in 22.61 s.

=== 2019–2022: Continued success and world bronze medal ===
On 20 February 2019, at the PSD Bank Meeting in Düsseldorf, Ta Lou ran a new personal best of 7.02 s to win the 60 m. In August, she competed at the African Games held in Rabat, where she won gold in the 100 m in a time of 11.09 s and finished third in the 200 m in 23.00 s. At the Diamond League Final in Brussels, Ta Lou finished third in 11.09 s.

At the 2019 World Championships in Doha, Ta Lou won the bronze medal in the 100 m in 10.90 s.

In 2021, Ta Lou ran a big season's best over 100 m on by winning at the Bislett Games on 1 July, in 10.91 s. She improved her season's best to 10.86 s in finishing third at the Gyulai István Memorial on 6 July. At the Olympic Games in Tokyo, Ta Lou ran an African record in the heats of the 100 m with a time of 10.78 s, she went onto finish fourth in the final in 10.79 s. In the 200 m, she placed fifth in a time of 22.27 s.

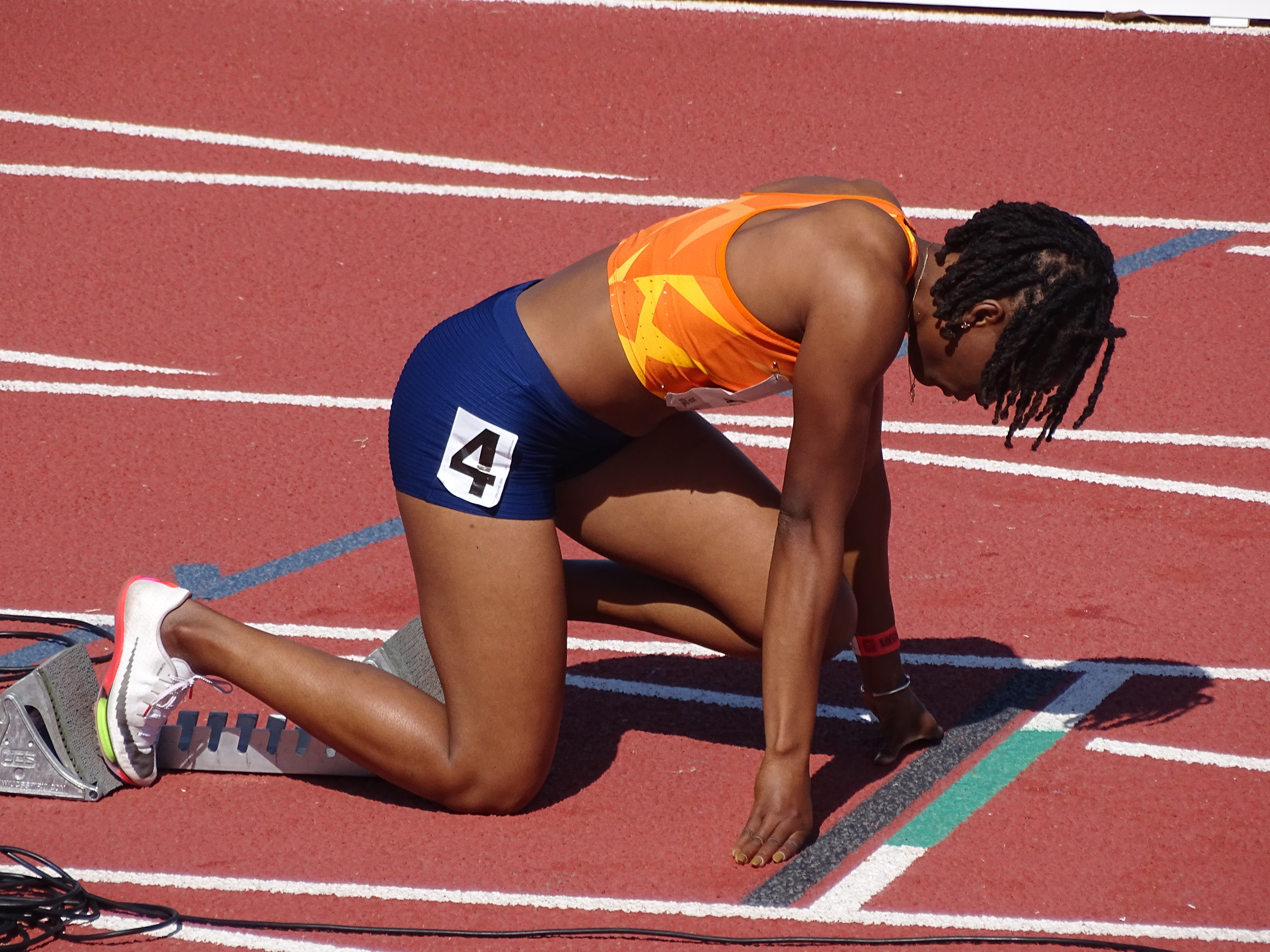
Ta Lou in the starting blocks of the 2022 Mt. SAC Relays

At the 2022 World Championships in Eugene, Ta Lou placed seventh in the 100 m final. On 10 August, she improved her own 100 m African record to 10.72 s in finishing third behind Shelly-Ann Fraser-Pryce and Shericka Jackson at the Monaco Diamond League. At the Diamond League Final in Zürich, Ta Lou finished third in the 100 m in a time of 10.91 s. On 12 September, she ended her season with a strong performance at the Galà dei Castelli meet in Bellinzona, winning the 100 m in 10.86 s.

=== 2023–present: Third Olympics ===
On 14 May 2023, at the Pure Athletics Sprint Meet in Clermont, Florida, Ta Lou won the 100 m in 10.78 s, her fifth-fastest time ever. She won in her first Diamond League appearance of the year, winning the 100 m at the Rome Diamond League in 10.97 s. She continued her strong form by winning the 100 m at the Janusz Kusociński Memorial on 4 June in 10.82 s, whilst also winning the 100 m at the 2023 Bislett Games in a meeting record of 10.75 s, also her second-fastest time ever. On 23 July, she won the 100 m at the 2023 London Diamond League, also in 10.75 s.

At the 2023 World Championships in Budapest, she finished fourth in the 100 m with a time of 10.81 s and ran 22.26 s in the semi-finals of the 200 m, not making it to the final. At the Diamond League Final in Eugene, Ta Lou finished second in both the 100 m and 200 m in 10.75 s and 22.10 s, respectively.

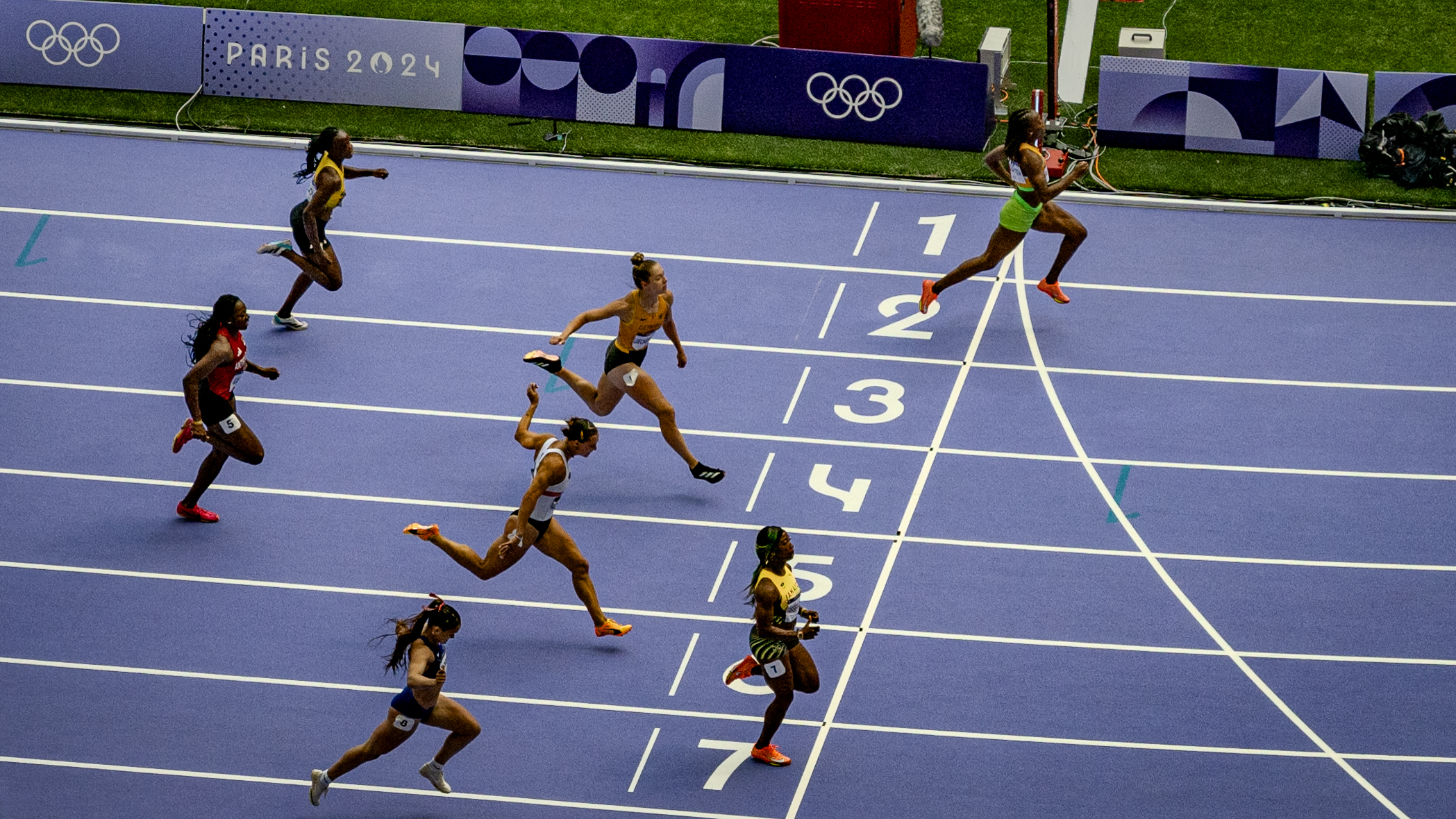
Ta Lou-Smith winning her 100 m heat at the 2024 Summer Olympics

In 2024, Ta Lou-Smith ran her first individual race of the season at the Jamaica Athletics Invitational on 11 May, winning the 100 m in 10.91 s. In June, she competed at the African Athletics Championships in Douala. However, she pulled out after winning her heat in 11.13 s, stating that she was disappointed in the facilities that were provided for the athletes.

At the 2024 Olympics in Paris, Ta Lou-Smith made it to the final of the 100 m. However, in the final, she pulled up injured and ended up finishing eighth. Her injury also caused her to miss the 200 m. She was able to return for the 4 × 100 m relay, however the Ivorian quartet were disqualified in the heats. On 13 September, Ta Lou-Smith finished third in the 100 m at the Diamond League Final in Brussels, clocking a time of 11.05 s. In her final race of the season, she competed at the inaugural Athlos meet in New York City, winning the 100 m in 10.98 s and taking home $60,000 in prize money.

The following year, Ta Lou-Smith finished second behind Thelma Davies at the Golden Spike Ostrava on 24 June in a time of 10.92 s. She improved her seasons best to 10.90 s in finishing third at the Prefontaine Classic on 5 June. She won over 100 m at the Gyulai Istvan Memorial in Budapest on 12 August, clocking 10.97 s. At the Silesia Diamond League, she finished third in a new season's best of 10.87 s. On 28 August, she finished third in both the 100 m and 200 m at the Diamond League Final in Zurich, running times of 10.92 s and 22.25 s respectively.

At the 2025 World Championships in Tokyo, Ta Lou-Smith finished seventh in the 100 m, clocking 11.04 s in the final. She also finished seventh in the 200 m, clocking 22.62 s.

== Statistics ==
Information from World Athletics profile.

=== Personal bests ===
Event	Time (s)	Wind (m/s)	Venue	Date	Notes
60 metres indoor	7.02	—N/a	Düsseldorf, Germany	20 February 2019	
100 metres	10.72	+0.4	Monaco	10 August 2022	African record and eighth of all time
150 metres	16.99	+0.6	Ostrava, Czech Republic	8 September 2020	**NBP**
200 metres	22.08	+0.8	London, United Kingdom	11 August 2017	**NR**

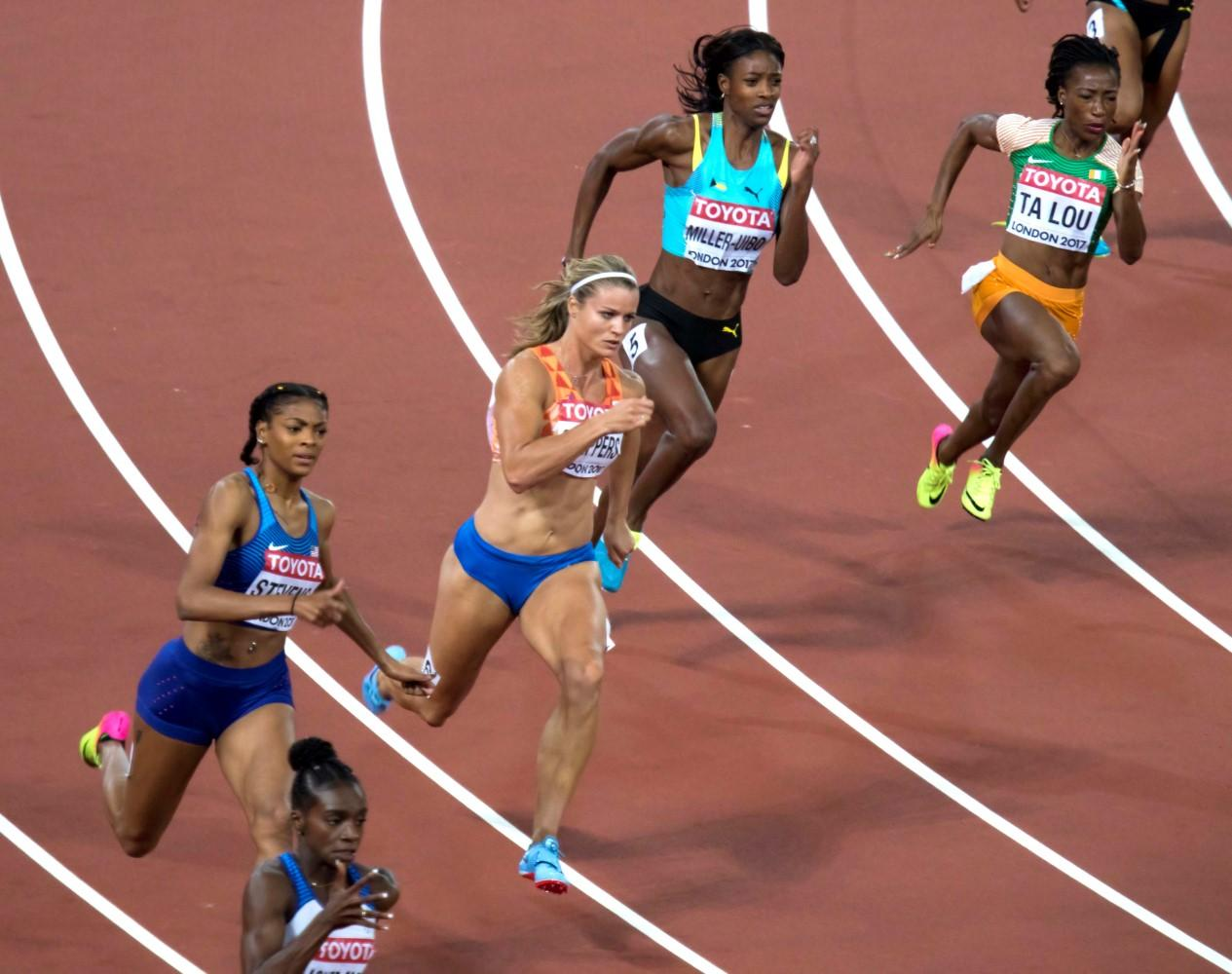
Ta Lou-Smith on her way to winning silver in the 200 m at the 2017 World Championships.

=== Season's best and rankings ===
Season's best 60 m, 100 m and 200 m times, with respective world ranking in brackets and personal bests bolded.

Year	60 metres	100 metres	200 metres
2010	–	12.10 (1433)	25.41 (3114)
2011	–	11.56 (242)	24.12 (659)
2012	–	11.53 (244)	23.26 (132)
2013	7.55 (415)	11.58 (271)	23.63 (301)
2014	–	11.20 (45)	22.78 (30)
2015	–	11.02 (26)	22.56 (25)
2016	7.06 (4)	10.86 (8)	22.21 (6)
2017	7.14 (11)	10.86 (7)	**22.08 (6)**
2018	7.05 (4)	10.85 (1)	22.34 (10)
2019	**7.02 (1)**	10.85 (5)	22.36 (10)
2020	–	11.14 (8)	23.33 (75)
2021	–	10.78 (5)	22.11 (11)
2022	–	10.72 (3)	22.64 (45)
2023	7.37 (218)	**10.75 (3)**	22.10 (10)
2024	–	10.87 (7)	22.36 (35)
2025	–	10.87 (8)	22.17 (14)

=== International competitions ===
Representing Ivory Coast
Year	Competition	Venue	Position	Event	Notes
2007	African Junior Championships	Ouagadougou, Burkina Faso	13th (h)	100 m	13.21
2010	African Championships	Nairobi, Kenya	13th (sf)	100 m	12.16
2010	African Championships	Nairobi, Kenya	20th (h)	200 m	25.55
2011	Universiade	Shenzhen, China	22nd (qf)	100 m	12.02
2011	Universiade	Shenzhen, China	18th (qf)	200 m	24.17
2011	All-Africa Games	Maputo, Mozambique	7th	100 m	11.66
2011	All-Africa Games	Maputo, Mozambique	6th	200 m	24.12
2012	African Championships	Porto-Novo, Benin	4th	100 m	11.53
2012	African Championships	Porto-Novo, Benin	3rd	200 m	23.44
2012	African Championships	Porto-Novo, Benin	3rd	4 × 100 m relay	45.29
2013	Universiade	Kazan, Russia	11th (sf)	100 m	11.73
2013	Universiade	Kazan, Russia	8th	200 m	23.63
2014	African Championships	Marrakesh, Morocco	3rd	100 m	11.20
2014	African Championships	Marrakesh, Morocco	2nd	200 m	22.87
2014	African Championships	Marrakesh, Morocco	2nd	4 × 100 m relay	43.99
2015	World Championships	Beijing, China	10th (sf)	100 m	11.04
2015	World Championships	Beijing, China	9th (sf)	200 m	22.56
2015	African Games	Brazzaville, Republic of the Congo	1st	100 m	11.02
2015	African Games	Brazzaville, Republic of the Congo	1st	200 m	22.57
2015	African Games	Brazzaville, Republic of the Congo	3rd	4 × 100 m relay	43.98
2016	World Indoor Championships	Portland, United States	7th	60 m	7.29
2016	African Championships	Durban, South Africa	3rd	100 m	11.15
2016	African Championships	Durban, South Africa	1st	200 m	22.81
2016	African Championships	Durban, South Africa	3rd	4 × 100 m relay	44.29
2016	Olympic Games	Rio de Janeiro, Brazil	4th	100 m	10.86
2016	Olympic Games	Rio de Janeiro, Brazil	4th	200 m	22.21
2017	Jeux de la Francophonie	Abidjan, Ivory Coast	1st	4 × 100 m relay	44.22
2017	World Championships	London, United Kingdom	2nd	100 m	10.86
2017	World Championships	London, United Kingdom	2nd	200 m	22.08 **NR**
2018	World Indoor Championships	Birmingham, United Kingdom	2nd	60 m	7.05
2018	African Championships	Asaba, Nigeria	1st	100 m	11.15
2018	African Championships	Asaba, Nigeria	1st	200 m	22.50
2018	African Championships	Asaba, Nigeria	2nd	4 × 100 m relay	44.40
2019	African Games	Rabat, Morocco	1st	100 m	11.09
2019	African Games	Rabat, Morocco	3rd	200 m	23.00
2019	World Championships	Doha, Qatar	3rd	100 m	10.90
2021	Olympic Games	Tokyo, Japan	4th	100 m	10.91
2021	Olympic Games	Tokyo, Japan	5th	200 m	22.27
2022	World Championships	Eugene, United States	7th	100 m	10.93
2023	World Championships	Budapest, Hungary	4th	100 m	10.81
2023	World Championships	Budapest, Hungary	8th	200 m	22.64
2023	World Championships	Budapest, Hungary	3rd (h)	4 × 100 m relay	41.90^{1}
2024	African Championships	Douala, Cameroon	1st (h)	100 m	11.13^{2}
2024	Olympic Games	Paris, France	8th	100 m	13.84
2024	Olympic Games	Paris, France	―	4 × 100 m relay	DQ
2025	World Championships	Tokyo, Japan	7th	100 m	11.04
2025	World Championships	Tokyo, Japan	7th	200 m	22.62

^{1}Did not finish in the final
^{2}Did not start in the semifinals

=== Circuit wins ===
- Diamond League
  - 2017: Monaco (200 m)
  - 2018: Doha (100 m), Eugene (100 m), Rome (200 m), Lausanne (100 m), Monaco (100 m)
  - 2021: Oslo (100 m)
  - 2023: Rome (100 m), Oslo (100 m), Lausanne (100 m), London (100 m)

== See also ==
- 2018 in 100 metres

Olympic Games
Preceded by Murielle Ahouré	Flagbearer for Ivory Coast; Tokyo 2020 with Cheick Sallah Cissé	Succeeded by Cheick Sallah Cissé; Maboundou Koné
