= 2016 African Championships in Athletics – Women's 4 × 100 metres relay =

The women's 4 × 100 metres relay event at the 2016 African Championships in Athletics was held on 24 June in Kings Park Stadium.

== Results ==
Rank	Lane	Nation	Competitors	Time	Notes
1st place, gold medalist(s)	6	South Africa	Tebogo Mamathu, Alyssa Conley, Tamzin Thomas, Carina Horn	43.66	
2nd place, silver medalist(s)	4	Ghana	Flings Owusu-Agyapong, Gemima Acheampong, Beatrice Gyaman, Janet Amponsah	44.05	
3rd place, bronze medalist(s)	5	Ivory Coast	Adeline Gouenon, Marie-Josée Ta Lou, Nene Kanaté, Murielle Ahouré	44.29	
4	2	Kenya	Eunice Kadogo, Millicent Ndoro, Monicah Zephaniah, Mary Chepkoech	46.00	
5	8	Botswana	Ontiretse Molapisi, Lydia Jele, Loungo Mathlaku, Goitseone Seleka	46.10	NR
6	7	Cameroon	Marie Ebah, Marie Eleme Asse, Germaine Abessolo Bivina, Audrey Nkamsad	46.23	
7	3	Zimbabwe	Alice Maunze, Tsitsi Mahachi, Sukoluhle Mlalazi, Yvonne Thomas	48.94	
