= Gemma Acheampong =

Ghanaian-American sprinter (born 1993)

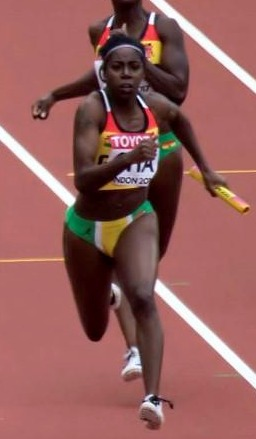
- Acheampong in October 2017

Personal information
- Born: 13 February 1993 (age 33) Chicago, Illinois, U.S.
- Education: Boston University
- Height: 5 ft 4 in (163 cm)
- Weight: 118 lb (54 kg)

Sport
- Sport: Track and field
- Event(s): 100 metres, 200 metres
- College team: Boston Terriers
- Coached by: Dave Hegland
Medal record
Women's athletics
Representing Ghana
African Games
Silver medal – second place	2015 Brazzaville	4x100 m
African Championships
Silver medal – second place	2016 Durban	4×100 m
Bronze medal – third place	2014 Marrakesh	4×100 m

Gemma Acheampong (born 13 February 1993) is a Ghanaian-American athlete specialising in the sprinting events. She holds the Ghanaian record in the rarely-contested indoor 300 meters event, and represented Ghana in the 4 × 100 metres relay at the 2016 Summer Olympics in Rio de Janeiro.

== Competition record ==
Year	Competition	Venue	Position	Event	Notes
Representing Ghana
2014	Commonwealth Games	Glasgow, United Kingdom	28th (h)	200 m	24.90
2014	Commonwealth Games	Glasgow, United Kingdom	–	4 × 100 m relay	DQ
2014	African Championships	Marrakesh, Morocco	6th	100 m	11.74
2014	African Championships	Marrakesh, Morocco	3rd	4 × 100 m relay	44.06
2015	African Games	Brazzaville, Republic of the Congo	10th (sf)	100 m	11.81
2015	African Games	Brazzaville, Republic of the Congo	2nd	4 × 100 m relay	43.72
2016	African Championships	Durban, South Africa	6th	100 m	11.49
2016	African Championships	Durban, South Africa	2nd	4 × 100 m relay	44.05
2016	Olympic Games	Rio de Janeiro, Brazil	14th (h)	4 × 100 m relay	43.37
2017	World Championships	London, United Kingdom	10th (h)	4 × 100 m relay	43.68
2018	Commonwealth Games	Gold Coast, Australia	19th (sf)	100 m	11.79
2018	Commonwealth Games	Gold Coast, Australia	5th	4 × 100 m relay	43.64
2019	World Relays	Yokohama, Japan	7th	4 × 100 m relay	44.77
2019	African Games	Rabat, Morocco	13th (sf)	100 m	11.93
2019	African Games	Rabat, Morocco	8th	4 × 100 m relay	47.24
2019	World Championships	Doha, Qatar	11th (h)	4 × 100 m relay	43.62
2021	World Relays	Chorzów, Poland	12th (h)	4 × 100 m relay	44.85

== Personal bests ==
Outdoor

- 100 metres – 11.43 (+0.2 m/s) (Cape Coast 2016)
- 200 metres – 24.21 (+1.2 m/s) (Princeton 2014)

Indoor

- 60 metres – 7.18 (Annapolis 2015)
- 200 metres – 24.41 (Boston 2015)
- 300 metres – 39.50 (Boston 2015) NR
