= Alyssa Conley =

South African sprinter (born 1991)

Personal information
- Born: April 27, 1991 (age 35) Johannesburg, South Africa
- Height: 1.76 m (5 ft 9 1/2 in)
- Weight: 63 kg (139 lb)

Sport
- Country: South Africa
- Sport: Athletics
- Event(s): 100 m, 200 m
Medal record
Women's athletics
Representing South Africa
African Championships
Gold medal – first place	2016 Durban	4×100 m
Silver medal – second place	2016 Durban	200 m

Alyssa Conley (born 27 April 1991) is a South African athlete competing in sprinting events. She won the silver medal in the 200 metres at the 2016 African Championships. Conley switched to rugby in 2019.

== International competitions ==
Year	Competition	Venue	Position	Event	Notes
Representing South Africa
2007	World Youth Championships	Ostrava, Czech Republic	6th	100 m	11.98
2007	World Youth Championships	Ostrava, Czech Republic	8th	200 m	24.40
2008	World Junior Championships	Bydgoszcz, Poland	27th (h)	200 m	24.44
2008	World Junior Championships	Bydgoszcz, Poland	19th (h)	4 × 100 m relay	46.37
2009	African Junior Championships	Bambous, Mauritius	2nd	100 m	12.17
2009	African Junior Championships	Bambous, Mauritius	2nd	200 m	25.55
2009	African Junior Championships	Bambous, Mauritius	3rd	4 × 100 m relay	48.73
2016	African Championships	Durban, South Africa	–	100 m	DQ
2016	African Championships	Durban, South Africa	2nd	200 m	22.84
2016	African Championships	Durban, South Africa	1st	4 × 100 m relay	43.66
2016	Olympic Games	Rio de Janeiro, Brazil	36th (h)	200 m	23.17

== Personal bests ==
Outdoor

- 100 metres – 11.23 (+0.6 m/s, Gavardo 2016)
- 200 metres – 22.84 (+1.2 m/s, Durban 2016)
