= Natasha Morrison =

Jamaican sprinter (born 1992)

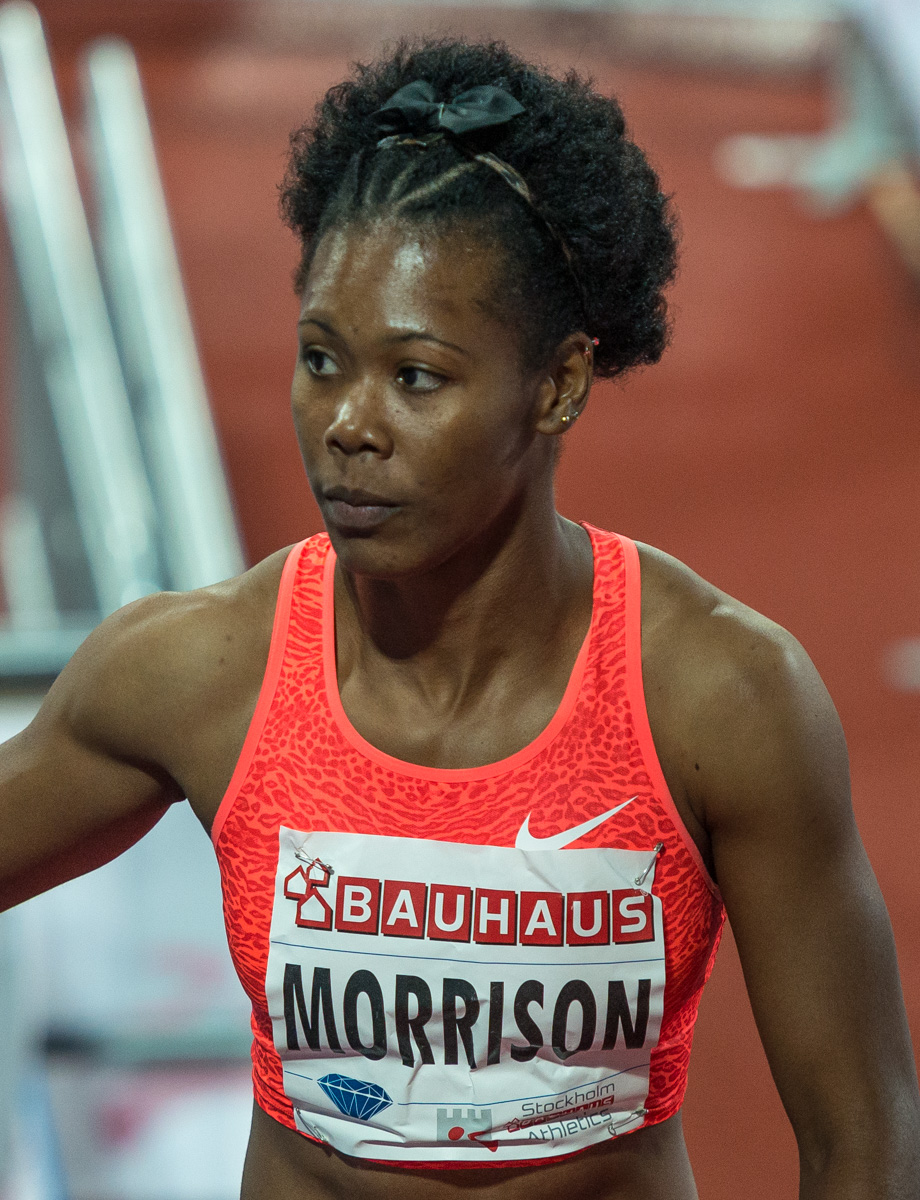
- Morrison in 2015

Personal information
- Born: 17 November 1992 (age 33) Saint Catherine Parish, Jamaica
- Height: 1.70 m (5 ft 7 in)
- Weight: 61 kg (134 lb)

Sport
- Country: Jamaica
- Sport: Athletics
- Event: 100 metres
- Club: MVP Track Club
- Coached by: Stephen Francis
Medal record
Women's athletics
Representing Jamaica
Olympic Games
Gold medal – first place	2020 Tokyo	4 × 100 m relay
World Championships
Gold medal – first place	2015 Beijing	4 × 100 m relay
Gold medal – first place	2019 Doha	4 × 100 m relay
Silver medal – second place	2023 Budapest	4 × 100 m relay
Bronze medal – third place	2017 London	4 × 100 m relay
World Relays
Bronze medal – third place	2025 Guangzhou	4×100 m relay
2018 Commonwealth Games
Silver medal – second place	2018 Gold Coast	4 × 100 m relay
NACAC Championships
Bronze medal – third place	2022 Freeport	100 m
Bronze medal – third place	2022 Freeport	4 × 100 m relay
Central American and Caribbean Games
Gold medal – first place	2018 Barranquilla	4 × 100 m relay

Natasha Morrison (born 17 November 1992) is a Jamaican sprinter.

== Biography ==
She attended Glengoff High School in St. Catherine, Jamaica, where she is from. A few years ago, the school principal showed recognition for her olympic gold medal achievement as the only person from the school to do so.

== Career ==
She represented her country at the 2015 World Championships in Beijing finishing seventh in the individual 100 metres and winning gold in the 4 × 100 metres relay. She won gold in 41.02 with the Jamaican team in the 4 × 100 m relay at the 2020 Summer Olympics in Tokyo, Japan, where she ran the heats in 42.15.

== International competitions ==
Year	Competition	Venue	Position	Event	Notes
Representing Jamaica
2011	Pan American Junior Championships	Miramar, United States	5th	100 m	11.59
2011	Pan American Junior Championships	Miramar, United States	2nd	4 × 100 m relay	45.37
2015	World Relays	Nassau, Bahamas	1st (h)	4 × 100 m relay	42.50
2015	World Championships	Beijing, China	7th	100 m	11.02
2015	World Championships	Beijing, China	1st	4 × 100 m relay	41.07
2017	World Relays	Nassau, Bahamas	2nd	4 × 100 m relay	42.95
2017	World Championships	London, United Kingdom	12th (sf)	100 m	11.15
2017	World Championships	London, United Kingdom	3rd	4 × 100 m relay	42.19
2018	Commonwealth Games	Gold Coast, Australia	5th	100 m	11.31
2018	Commonwealth Games	Gold Coast, Australia	2nd	4 × 100 m relay	42.52
2018	Central American and Caribbean Games	Barranquilla, Colombia	1st	4 × 100 m relay	43.41
2019	World Relays	Yokohama, Japan	2nd	4 × 100 m relay	43.29
2019	Pan American Games	Lima, Peru	6th	100 m	11.40
2019	Pan American Games	Lima, Peru	5th	4 × 100 m relay	43.74
2019	World Championships	Doha, Qatar	1st (h)	4 × 100 m relay	42.11
2021	Olympic Games	Tokyo, Japan	1st	4 × 100 m relay	41.02
2022	NACAC Championships	Freeport, Bahamas	3rd	100 m	11.11
2022	NACAC Championships	Freeport, Bahamas	3rd	4 × 100 m relay	43.49
2023	World Championships	Budapest, Hungary	12th (sf)	100 m	11.03
2023	World Championships	Budapest, Hungary	2nd	4 × 100 m relay	41.21
2025	World Indoor Championships	Nanjing, China	16th (sf)	60 m	7.25
2025	World Relays	Guangzhou, China	3rd	4 × 100 m relay	42.33
2026	Central American and Caribbean Games	Santo Domingo, Dominican Republic	11th (h)	100 m	11.70
2026	Central American and Caribbean Games	Santo Domingo, Dominican Republic	4th	4 × 100 m relay	43.42

== Personal bests ==
Outdoor

- 100 metres – 10.85 (+0.8 m/s, Eugene 2023)
- 200 metres – 22.74 (+0.8 m/s, Kingston 2021)

Indoor

- 60 metres – 7.09 (-0.6 m/s, St. Catherine 2025)
