= Aaliyah Brown =

American sprinter

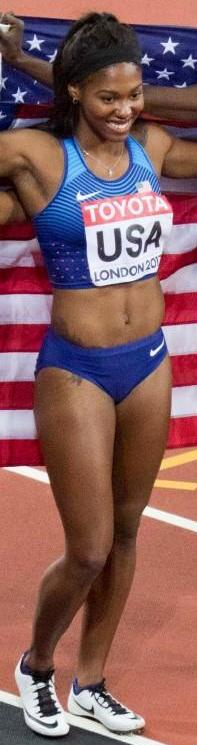

Personal information
- Nationality: American
- Born: January 6, 1995 (age 31)

Sport
- Sport: Sprinting
- Event: 100 metres
Medal record
Representing the United States
World Championships
| Gold medal – first place | 2017 London | 4 × 100 m relay |

Aaliyah Brown (born January 6, 1995) is an American sprinter. She competed in the women's 4 × 100 metres relay at the 2017 World Championships in Athletics.

Brown competed for the Texas A&M Aggies track and field team in the NCAA.
