= Jolene Jacobs =

Namibian sprinter (born 1992)

Personal information
- Nationality: Namibian
- Born: 24 March 1992 (age 33)

Sport
- Sport: Athletics
- Event: Sprinting

Jolene Jacobs (born 24 March 1992) is a Namibian athlete. She competed in the women's 60 metres at the 2018 IAAF World Indoor Championships. In 2019, she represented Namibia at the 2019 African Games held in Rabat, Morocco. She competed in the women's 100 metres.
