= Hellen Makumba =

Zambian sprinter

Personal information
- Nationality: Zambian
- Born: 16 May 1996 (age 29)

Sport
- Sport: Athletics
- Event: Sprinting

Hellen Makumba (born 16 May 1996) is a Zambian athlete. She competed in the women's 100 metres event at the 2019 World Athletics Championships. She also represented Zambia at the 2019 African Games and she competed in the women's 100 metres and women's 4 × 100 metres relay events.
