= Persis William-Mensah =

Ghanaian sprinter

Personal information
- Nationality: Ghanaian
- Born: 15 June 1996 (age 29)

Sport
- Sport: Athletics
- Event: Sprinting

Persis William-Mensah (born 15 June 1996) is a Ghanaian athlete. She competed in the women's 4 × 100 metres relay event at the 2019 World Athletics Championships. In 2019, she also represented Ghana at the 2019 African Games held in Rabat, Morocco. She competed in the women's 100 metres.
