= Athletics at the 2010 Commonwealth Games – Women's 100 metres =

Women's 100 metres at the Commonwealth Games

The Women's 100 metres at the 2010 Commonwealth Games as part of the athletics programme was held at the Jawaharlal Nehru Stadium on Wednesday 6 October and Thursday 7 October 2010.

The final was subject to some controversy. England's Laura Turner and Australia's Sally Pearson had a simultaneous false start, but only Turner was initially disqualified, "on the grounds that her reaction time was the quicker". Turner refused to leave the track, and officials eventually authorised her to run "under protest", meaning that her time would not be recorded unless her disqualification was overturned. She finished last, and her time was not recorded. Pearson won the race, but admitted afterwards that she had "twitched first" out of the starting blocks, and England and Nigeria both requested that she be disqualified for her false start; her disqualification would enable Nigeria's Oludamola Osayomi to claim gold, and England's Katherine Endacott to claim bronze. Pearson was disqualified, and expressed tearful disappointment at having been "told [she] was clear": "I did my victory lap with the flag. I was walking out to the medal ceremony and then I was called back. That's not right". Australia counter-appealed, unsuccessfully.

On 11 October it was reported that supposed gold medal winner Oludamola Osayomi was the first person to test positive for banned substances during the 2010 Games, returning a positive doping test for the stimulant methylhexaneamine. Osayomi was provisionally suspended pending the results of testing on her B sample. It was reported that the positive testing was the result of prescription medication for a toothache. When the B sample also tested positive Oludamola Osayomi was stripped of her 100m gold medal and Natasha Mayers of St Vincent and the Grenadines was promoted to the gold medal, while English runner Katherine Endacott was promoted to the silver medal (having originally placed fourth) and Cameroon's Bertille Atangana, who originally placed fifth will receive bronze.

== Records ==
World Record	10.49	Florence Griffith-Joyner	United States	Indianapolis, United States	16 July 1988
Games Record	10.91	Debbie Ferguson	BAH	Manchester, England	29 July 2002

== Heats ==
First 4 in each heat (Q) and 4 best performers (q) advance to the Semifinals.

=== Heat 1 ===
Rank	Lane	Name	Reaction Time	Result	Notes	Qual.
1	6	Natasha Mayers (SVG)	0.143	11.33	SB	Q
2	9	Eleni Artymata (CYP)	0.203	11.44	SB	Q
3	8	Amy Foster (NIR)	0.181	11.76		Q
4	4	Melissa Breen (AUS)	0.176	11.76		Q
5	5	Sathi Geetha (IND)	0.170	11.80	=PB	q
6	7	Beatrice Gyaman (GHA)	0.161	11.90	PB	q
7	3	Kaina Martinez (BIZ)	0.231	12.27		
8	2	Saruba Colley (GAM)	0.175	12.37		

=== Heat 2 ===
Rank	Lane	Name	Reaction Time	Result	Notes	Qual.
1	2	Agnes Osazuwa (NGR)	0.188	11.47		Q
2	9	Toea Wisil (PNG)	0.162	11.66		Q
3	5	Ayanna Hutchinson (TRI)	0.176	11.71		Q
4	6	Jyothi Hiriyur Manjunath (IND)	0.186	11.81		Q
5	3	Michaela Karbgo (SLE)	0.174	12.00		q
6	7	Susan Tengatenga (MAW)	0.287	12.38	SB	
7	4	Shams-Un-Nahar Chumky (BAN)	0.194	12.69		
8	8	Alice Khan (SEY)	0.172	12.90		

=== Heat 3 ===
Rank	Lane	Name	Reaction Time	Result	Notes	Qual.
1	6	Elaine O´Neill (WAL)	0.178	11.60		Q
2	9	Tahesia Harrigan (IVB)	0.260	11.69		Q
3	8	Shakera Reece (BAR)	0.182	11.77		Q
4	2	Elizabeth Amolofo (GHA)	0.207	12.00		Q
5	3	Charlotte Mebenga Amombo (CMR)	0.211	12.14		
6	4	Rebecca Ansumana (SLE)	0.158	12.18		
7	5	Shanna Thomas (JAM)	0.174	12.21		
8	7	Helen Philemon (PNG)	0.192	12.55	=PB	

=== Heat 4 ===
Rank	Lane	Name	Reaction Time	Result	Notes	Qual.
1	8	Oludamola Osayomi (NGR)	0.193	11.49		Q
2	6	Bertille Atangana (CMR)	0.148	11.53		Q
3	5	Montell Douglas (ENG)	0.171	11.74		Q
4	2	Janet Amponsah (GHA)	0.178	11.94		Q
5	4	Yanique Boothe (JAM)	0.224	11.97		q
6	7	Mildred Gamba (UGA)	0.200	12.11		
7	9	Leticia Macauley (SLE)	0.181	12.40		
8	3	Fanny Shonobi (GAM)	0.190	12.47		

=== Heat 5 ===
Rank	Lane	Name	Reaction Time	Result	Notes	Qual.
1	6	Sally Pearson (AUS)	0.153	11.50		Q
2	8	Katherine Endacott (ENG)	0.186	11.50		Q
3	3	Laura Turner (ENG)	0.191	11.61		Q
4	4	Mary Vincent (MRI)	0.218	11.90	NR	Q
5	2	Fanny Appes Ekanga (CMR)	0.185	12.03	PB	
6	5	Kylie Robilliard (GUE)	0.172	12.20	PB	
7	7	Patricia Taea (COK)		13.10	NR	

== Semifinals ==
=== Semifinal 1 ===
Rank	Lane	Name	Reaction Time	Result	Notes	Qual.
1	5	Natasha Mayers (SVG)	0.146	11.38		Q
2	6	Katherine Endacott (ENG)	0.174	11.45	PB	Q
3	7	Eleni Artymata (CYP)	0.226	11.57		
4	4	Ayanna Hutchinson (TRI)	0.181	11.58		
5	9	Melissa Breen (AUS)	0.184	11.78		
6	3	Michaela Karbgo (SLE)	0.178	12.01		
7	2	Janet Amponsah (GHA)		12.03		
	8	Mary Vincent (MRI)		DQ		

=== Semifinal 2 ===
Rank	Lane	Name	Reaction Time	Result	Notes	Qual.
1	5	Oludamola Osayomi (NGR)	0.190	11.33		Q
2	7	Bertille Atangana (CMR)	0.136	11.42	SB	Q
3	6	Toea Wisil (PNG)	0.161	11.49	PB	q
4	4	Tahesia Harrigan (IVB)	0.163	11.51		q
5	9	Montell Douglas (ENG)	0.171	11.62		
6	8	Shakera Reece (BAR)	0.179	11.78		
7	2	Sathi Geetha (IND)	0.182	11.82		
8	3	Beatrice Gyaman (GHA)	0.180	11.93		

=== Semifinal 3 ===
Rank	Lane	Name	Reaction Time	Result	Notes	Qual.
1	4	Sally Pearson (AUS)	0.146	11.28	SB	Q
2	6	Laura Turner (ENG)	0.174	11.41		Q
3	5	Agnes Osazuwa (NGR)	0.220	11.52		
4	7	Elaine O´Neill (WAL)	0.137	11.55		
5	8	Amy Foster (NIR)	0.173	11.61	=SB	
6	9	Jyothi Hiriyur Manjunath (IND)	0.189	11.86		
7	3	Elizabeth Amolofo (GHA)	0.188	11.89		
8	2	Yanique Boothe (JAM)	0.235	12.01		

== Final ==
Rank	Lane	Name	Reaction Time	Result	Notes
1st place, gold medalist(s)	6	Natasha Mayers (SVG)	0.151	11.37	
2nd place, silver medalist(s)	8	Katherine Endacott (ENG)	0.191	11.44	PB
3rd place, bronze medalist(s)	9	Bertille Atangana (CMR)	0.155	11.48	
4	2	Toea Wisil (PNG)	0.160	11.52	
5	3	Tahesia Harrigan (IVB)	0.135	11.56	
	5	Oludamola Osayomi (NGR)		DQ	
	4	Laura Turner (ENG)		DQ	
	7	Sally Pearson (AUS)		DQ	
