= 2010 African Championships in Athletics – Women's 100 metres =

The women's 100 metres at the 2010 African Championships in Athletics were held on July 28–29.

== Medalists ==
Gold	Silver	Bronze
Blessing Okagbare; Nigeria	Perennes Pau Zang Milama; Gabon	Damola Osayemi; Nigeria

== Results ==
=== Heats ===
Qualification: First 3 of each heat (Q) and the next 4 fastest (q) qualified for the semifinals.

Rank	Heat	Name	Nationality	Time	Notes
1	4	Agnes Osazuwa	Nigeria	11.51	Q
2	3	Perennes Pau Zang Milama	Gabon	11.56	Q
3	1	Blessing Okagbare	Nigeria	11.56	Q
4	2	Damola Osayemi	Nigeria	11.60	Q
5	2	Delphine Atangana	Cameroon	11.73	Q, SB
6	4	Charlotte Mebenga Amombo	Cameroon	11.78	Q
7	1	Lorène Bazolo	Republic of the Congo	12.01	Q, NR
8	1	Flings Owusu-Agyapong	Ghana	12.04	Q
9	2	Mary Jane Vincent	Mauritius	12.07	Q
10	3	Mariette Mien	Burkina Faso	12.15	Q, SB
11	2	Phobay Kutu-Akoi	Liberia	12.16	q
12	4	Milcent Ndoro	Kenya	12.19	Q, SB
13	3	Fanny Appes Ekanga	Cameroon	12.22	Q
14	2	Beatrice Gyaman	Ghana	12.29	q
15	3	Marie Josée Ta Lou	Ivory Coast	12.29	q
16	3	Yah Koita	Mali	12.30	q
17	2	Maryline Chelagat	Kenya	12.31	
18	1	Stephanie Guillaume	Mauritius	12.32	
19	3	Mildred Gamba	Uganda	12.38	
20	4	Charlene Adjele	Benin	12.40	
21	3	Alice Khan	Seychelles	12.43	
22	4	Najima George Kalekwa	Tanzania	12.55	
23	1	Anatercia Quive	Mozambique	12.65	
24	2	Leaynet Alemu	Ethiopia	12.70	
25	4	Josephine Aleo	Uganda	12.86	
	3	Roseline Indimu Atsabina	Kenya	DQ	
	1	Hubtama Ali	Ethiopia	DNS	
	1	Merlin Bernice Diamond	Namibia	DNS	
	1	Sophie Kanakuze	Rwanda	DNS	
	2	Suzen Tengatenga	Malawi	DNS	
	4	Hinikissia Ndikert	Chad	DNS	
	4	Deborrah Zoumbeti	Central African Republic	DNS	

=== Semifinals ===
Qualification: First 3 of each semifinal (Q) and the next 2 fastest (q) qualified for the final.

Rank	Heat	Name	Nationality	Time	Notes
1	1	Blessing Okagbare	Nigeria	11.16	Q
2	2	Damola Osayemi	Nigeria	11.26	Q
3	2	Agnes Osazuwa	Nigeria	11.33	Q, SB
4	1	Perennes Pau Zang Milama	Gabon	11.37	Q
5	2	Delphine Atangana	Cameroon	11.54	Q, PB
6	1	Charlotte Mebenga Amombo	Cameroon	11.81	Q
7	1	Mary Jane Vincent	Mauritius	11.92	q, SB
8	2	Mariette Mien	Burkina Faso	11.96	q, SB
9	2	Flings Owusu-Agyapong	Ghana	12.00	
10	1	Lorène Bazolo	Republic of the Congo	12.08	
11	2	Phobay Kutu-Akoi	Liberia	12.10	
12	2	Fanny Appes Ekanga	Cameroon	12.15	
13	1	Marie Josée Ta Lou	Ivory Coast	12.16	
14	1	Beatrice Gyaman	Ghana	12.20	
15	2	Yah Koita	Mali	12.30	
16	1	Milcent Ndoro	Kenya	12.38	

=== Final ===
Wind: +1.80 m/s

Rank	Lane	Name	Nationality	Time	Notes
1st place, gold medalist(s)	4	Blessing Okagbare	Nigeria	11.03	CR
2nd place, silver medalist(s)	5	Perennes Pau Zang Milama	Gabon	11.15	NR
3rd place, bronze medalist(s)	3	Damola Osayemi	Nigeria	11.22	SB
4	6	Agnes Osazuwa	Nigeria	11.33	SB
5	8	Delphine Atangana	Cameroon	11.43	PB
6	7	Charlotte Mebenga Amombo	Cameroon	11.71	
7	2	Mary Jane Vincent	Mauritius	11.78	SB
8	1	Mariette Mien	Burkina Faso	11.94	
