= Athletics at the 2014 Commonwealth Games – Women's 4 × 100 metres relay =

Women's 4 × 100 metres relay at the Commonwealth Games

The Women's 4 × 100 metres relay at the 2014 Commonwealth Games, as part of the athletics programme, took place at Hampden Park on 1 and 2 August 2014.

== Heats ==
=== Heat 1 ===
Rank	Nation	Members	Result	Notes	Qual.
1	Nigeria	Gloria Asumnu; Patience Okon George; Dominique Duncan; Lawretta Ozoh	44.13		Q
2	Australia	Melissa Breen; Ashleigh Whittaker; Ella Nelson; MichelleCutmore	44.45		Q
3	Trinidad and Tobago	Deborah John; Rayare Thomas; Lisa Wickham; Kamaria Durant	44.47		Q
4	Bahamas	Sheniqua Ferguson; Shaunae Miller; Krystal Bodie; Nivea Smith	44.50		Q
5	India	Narayana Sharadha; Asha Roy; Srabani Nanda; Jyothi Hiriyur Manjunath	44.81		
6	Malta	Rebecca Camilleri; Diane Borg; Rebecca Sare; Rachel Fitz	46.75		
7	Ghana	Flings Owusu-Agyapong; Gemma Acheampong; Beatrice Gyaman; Doreen Agyei	DQ		
8	Sierra Leone	Michaela Kargbo; Catherine Eke; Hafsatu Kamara; Rebecca Ansumana	DNS		

=== Heat 2 ===
Rank	Nation	Members	Results	Notes	Qual.
1	Jamaica	Kerron Stewart; Veronica Campbell-Brown; Elaine Thompson; Shelly-Ann Fraser-Pryce	42.44	=GR	Q
2	England	Asha Philip; Anyika Onuora; Louise Bloor; Ashleigh Nelson	43.33		Q
3	Canada	Crystal Emmanuel; Kimberly Hyacinthe; Phylicia George; Khamica Bingham	43.66		Q
4	Wales	Hannah Brier; Hannah Thomas; Mica Moore; Rachel Johncock	44.66		Q*
5	Kenya	Milicent Ndoro; Sabina Mukoswa; Koki Manunga; Maureen Thomas	46.00		
6	Singapore	Habibah Najihahbi Binte Ahmad; Veronica Shanti Pereira; Eugenia Tan; Kugapriya Chandran	46.84		

* Wales were initially disqualified, but were restored to the final on appeal, taking the place of India.

== Final ==
Rank	Nation	Members	Result	Notes
1st place, gold medalist(s)	Jamaica	Kerron Stewart; Veronica Campbell-Brown; Schillonie Calvert; Shelly-Ann Fraser-Pryce	41.83	GR
2nd place, silver medalist(s)	Nigeria	Gloria Asumnu; Blessing Okagbare; Dominique Duncan; Lawretta Ozoh	42.92	
3rd place, bronze medalist(s)	England	Asha Philip; Bianca Williams; Jodie Williams; Ashleigh Nelson	43.10	
4	Canada	Crystal Emmanuel; Kimberly Hyacinthe; Phylicia George; Khamica Bingham	43.33	
5	Australia	Melissa Breen; Ashleigh Whittaker; Ella Nelson; Margaret Gayen	44.21	
6	Bahamas	Katrina Seymour; Sheniqua Ferguson; Cache Armbrister; Nivea Smith	44.25	
7	Wales	Hannah Brier; Hannah Thomas; Mica Moore; Rachel Johncock	44.51	
8	Trinidad and Tobago	Deborah John; Reyare Thomas; Lisa Wickham; Kamaria Durant	44.78	
