= Flings Owusu-Agyapong =

Ghanaian sprinter (born 1988)

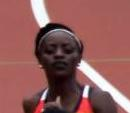
- Owusu-Agyapong in 2017

Personal information
- Full name: Flings Joyner Owusu-Agyapong
- Born: 16 October 1988 (age 37) Kumasi, Ghana
- Education: Syracuse University
- Height: 1.63 m (5 ft 4 in)
- Weight: 60 kg (132 lb)

Sport
- Country: Ghana
- Sport: Athletics
- Event(s): 60 metres, 100 metres
- College team: Syracuse Orange
- Coached by: Dave Hegland
Medal record
Women's athletics
Representing Ghana
African Games
Silver medal – second place	2015 Brazzaville	4×100 m
African Championships
Silver medal – second place	2012 Porto-Novo	4×100 m
Silver medal – second place	2016 Durban	4×100 m
Bronze medal – third place	2010 Nairobi	4×100 m
Bronze medal – third place	2014 Marrakesh	4×100 m

Flings Owusu-Agyapong (born 16 October 1988) is a Ghanaian sprinter.

She competed in the 100 metres and the 4 x 100 metres relay at the 2016 Summer Olympics in Rio de Janeiro, Brazil. She was also the flag bearer for the Ghanaian team at the opening ceremony.

== Life ==
She was born in Kumasi, Ghana, to parents Kwadwo Agyapong and Adwoa Akomaa and moved to Toronto in Canada when she was 9 years old. She started training with the Flying Angels athletics club after her sophomore year of high school. In 2006 and 2007 she made the Ontario provincial team for the National Scholastic Indoor Championships.

Owusu-Agyapong attended Syracuse University on an athletic scholarship. While at Syracuse she broke the school records for the 55, 60, and 100 metres and was a two-time 2nd team All-American. She graduated from Syracuse with a Bachelor of Science degree in public health.

== Career ==
Owusu-Agyapong competed in the 60 metres at the 2014 and 2016 World Indoor Championships without advancing from the first round.

She competed in the 100 metres and the 4 x 100 metres relay at the 2016 Summer Olympics. She achieved qualification for the 100 metres in April 2016 by running 11.30 at the 2016 Miami Hurricane Alumni Invitational in Miami, Florida. With her teammates Gemma Acheampong, Janet Amponsah, and Beatrice Gyaman she achieved qualification for the 4 x 100 metres relay on 8 July 2016 by running 42.67 to win the 4 x 100 metres at the Soga-Nana Memorial meet in Cape Coast. The time of 42.67 was a new national record, eclipsing the previous record of 43.19 that had stood since 2000. The same team also won silver at the 2016 African Championships in Durban in June 2016 in a time of 44.05.

At the 2016 Olympics she finished 4th in her heat of the 100 metres in a time of 11.43 but did not advance to the semifinals. In the 4 × 100 metres the team finished 8th in their heat in a time of 43.47 and did not qualify for the final.

== Competition record ==
Year	Competition	Venue	Position	Event	Notes
Representing Ghana
2010	African Championships	Nairobi, Kenya	9th (h)	100 m	12.00
2010	African Championships	Nairobi, Kenya	3rd	4 × 100 m relay	45.40
2011	All-Africa Games	Maputo, Mozambique	10th (h)	100 m	11.88
2012	African Championships	Porto-Novo, Benin	5th	100 m	11.75
2012	African Championships	Porto-Novo, Benin	2nd	4 × 100 m relay	44.35
2014	World Indoor Championships	Sopot, Poland	29th (h)	60 m	7.42
2014	Commonwealth Games	Glasgow, United Kingdom	15th (sf)	100 m	11.55
2014	Commonwealth Games	Glasgow, United Kingdom	–	4 × 100 m relay	DQ
2014	African Championships	Marrakesh, Morocco	5th (h)	100 m	11.62^{1}
2014	African Championships	Marrakesh, Morocco	3rd	4 × 100 m relay	44.06
2015	African Games	Brazzaville, Republic of the Congo	6th	100 m	11.61
2015	African Games	Brazzaville, Republic of the Congo	2nd	4 × 100 m relay	43.72
2016	World Indoor Championships	Portland, United States	26th (h)	60 m	7.36
2016	African Championships	Durban, South Africa	SF	200 m	DNS
2016	African Championships	Durban, South Africa	2nd	4 × 100 m relay	44.05
2016	Olympic Games	Rio de Janeiro, Brazil	28th (h)	100 m	11.43
2016	Olympic Games	Rio de Janeiro, Brazil	14th (h)	4 × 100 m relay	43.37
2017	World Championships	London, United Kingdom	10th (h)	4 × 100 m relay	43.68
2018	World Indoor Championships	Birmingham, United Kingdom	38th (h)	60 m	7.49
2018	Commonwealth Games	Gold Coast, Australia	12th (sf)	100 m	11.60
2018	Commonwealth Games	Gold Coast, Australia	5th	4 × 100 m relay	43.64
2019	World Relays	Yokohama, Japan	7th	4 × 100 m relay	44.77
2019	African Games	Rabat, Morocco	8th	4 × 100 m relay	47.24
2019	World Championships	Doha, Qatar	11th (h)	4 × 100 m relay	43.62

^{1}Disqualified in the semifinals

== Personal bests ==
Outdoor

- 100 metres – 11.26 (+0.3 m/s, Clermont 2016)
- 200 metres – 23.28 (+1.7 m/s, Coral Gables 2016)

Indoor

- 60 metres – 7.18 (New York 2015) NR
- 200 metres – 23.34 (Boston 2016) NR

Olympic Games
Preceded by Maxwell Amponsah	Flagbearer for Ghana; Rio de Janeiro 2016	Succeeded by Akwasi Frimpong
