= 2012 African Championships in Athletics – Women's 100 metres =

The women's 100 metres at the 2012 African Championships in Athletics was held at the Stade Charles de Gaulle on 27 and 28 June.

== Medalists ==
Gold	Ruddy Zang Milama; Gabon
Silver	Blessing Okagbare; Nigeria
Bronze	Gloria Asumnu; Nigeria

== Records ==
Standing records prior to the 2012 African Championships in Athletics
World record	Florence Griffith Joyner (USA)	10.49	Indianapolis, United States	16 July 1988
African record	Glory Alozie (NGR)	10.90	La Laguna, Spain	5 June 1999
Championship record	Blessing Okagbare (NGR)	11.03	Nairobi, Kenya	29 July 2010

== Schedule ==
Date	Time	Round
27 June 2012	12:30	Round 1
28 June 2012	13:00	Semifinals
28 June 2012	15:00	Final

== Results ==
=== Round 1 ===
First 4 in each heat (Q) and 4 best performers (q) advance to the Semifinals.

Wind:
Heat 1: -1.6 m/s, Heat 2: -3.2 m/s, Heat 3: -3.1 m/s, Heat 4: -2.2 m/s, Heat 5: -2.1 m/s

Rank	Heat	Lane	Name	Nationality	Time	Note
1	2	6	Ruddy Zang Milama	Gabon	11.33	Q
2	3	3	Gloria Asumnu	Nigeria	11.54	Q
3	1	2	Blessing Okagbare	Nigeria	11.60	Q
4	4	6	Phobay Kutu-Akoi	Liberia	11.65	Q
5	4	3	Janet Amponsah	Ghana	11.68	Q
6	5	8	Marie Josée Ta Lou	Ivory Coast	11.73	Q
7	2	2	Delphine Atangana	Cameroon	11.86	Q
8	1	7	Lorène Bazolo	Republic of the Congo	11.89	Q
9	5	3	Flings Owusu-Agyapong	Ghana	11.90	Q
10	3	7	Fanny Appès Ekanga	Cameroon	11.93	Q
11	4	1	Ahamada Feta	Comoros	11.99	Q
12	3	6	Globine Mayova	Namibia	12.10	Q
13	3	4	Saruba Colley	Gambia	12.12	Q
14	5	1	Sergine Kouanga	Cameroon	12.19	Q
15	2	3	Adeline Gouenon	Ivory Coast	12.20	Q
16	3	2	Millicent Ndoro	Kenya	12.25	q
17	1	6	Mary Jane Vincent	Mauritius	12.30	Q
18	5	6	Benjamine Padonou	Benin	12.35	Q
19	4	4	Rochidath Oroy	Benin	12.37	Q
20	4	5	Hinikissia Albertine Ndikert	Chad	12.39	q
21	4	7	Mariette Mien	Burkina Faso	12.44	q
22	1	8	Amandine Allou Affoue	Ivory Coast	12.56	Q
23	3	5	Bamab Napo	Togo	12.58	q
24	1	4	Joanne Loytoy	Seychelles	12.62	
25	5	2	Fanny Shonobi	Gambia	12.67	
26	2	5	Chauzje Choosha	Zambia	12.72	Q
27	4	2	Tegest Tamagnu	Ethiopia	12.74	
28	2	4	Aminata Djegue Diakite	Mali	12.87	
29	1	3	Gezah Hala	Libya	13.15	
30	2	8	Beatriz Mangue	Equatorial Guinea	13.60	
	5	7	Fetiya Kedir	Ethiopia	DSQ	
	2	7	Vida Anim	Ghana	DNF	
	1	5	Ada Udaya	Liberia	DNS	
	3	8	Selam Tesfamariam	Eritrea	DNS	
	4	8	Patience Boyibala	Democratic Republic of the Congo	DNS	
	5	4	Lawretta Ozoh	Nigeria	DNS	
	5	5	Rebeca Ansoumana	Seychelles	DNS	

=== Semifinals ===
First 2 in each heat (Q) and 2 best performers (q) advance to the Final.

Wind:
Heat 1: -0.1 m/s, Heat 2: 0.0 m/s, Heat 3: 0.0 m/s

Rank	Heat	Lane	Name	Nationality	Time	Note
1	1	6	Gloria Asumnu	Nigeria	11.22	Q
2	2	6	Blessing Okagbare	Nigeria	11.26	Q
3	3	6	Ruddy Zang Milama	Gabon	11.29	Q
4	1	5	Marie Josée Ta Lou	Ivory Coast	11.62	Q
5	2	4	Phobay Kutu-Akoi	Liberia	11.74	Q
6	3	3	Janet Amponsah	Ghana	11.76	Q
7	2	3	Flings Owusu-Agyapong	Ghana	11.76	q
8	1	3	Lorène Bazolo	Republic of the Congo	11.85	q
9	3	4	Globine Mayova	Namibia	11.91	
10	3	5	Delphine Atangana	Cameroon	11.93	
11	1	4	Ahamada Feta	Comoros	11.94	
12	2	4	Fanny Appès Ekanga	Cameroon	11.97	
13	1	8	Sergine Kouanga	Cameroon	12.13	
14	2	7	Saruba Colley	Gambia	12.18	
15	3	1	Millicent Ndoro	Kenya	12.26	
16	2	8	Mary Jane Vincent	Mauritius	12.31	
17	3	7	Adeline Gouenon	Ivory Coast	12.39	
18	2	2	Hinikissia Albertine Ndikert	Chad	12.40	
19	1	2	Mariette Mien	Burkina Faso	12.44	
20	1	7	Benjamine Padonou	Benin	12.52	
21	3	2	Bamab Napo	Togo	12.68	
22	2	1	Amandine Allou Affoue	Ivory Coast	12.69	
23	1	1	Chauzje Choosha	Zambia	12.71	
24	3	8	Rochidath Oroy	Benin	12.97	

=== Final ===
Wind: -0.8 m/s

Rank	Lane	Name	Nationality	Time	Note
1st place, gold medalist(s)	5	Ruddy Zang Milama	Gabon	11.16	
2nd place, silver medalist(s)	3	Blessing Okagbare	Nigeria	11.18	
3rd place, bronze medalist(s)	6	Gloria Asumnu	Nigeria	11.28	
4	4	Marie Josée Ta Lou	Ivory Coast	11.53	
5	2	Flings Owusu-Agyapong	Ghana	11.75	
6	7	Janet Amponsah	Ghana	11.76	
7	1	Lorène Bazolo	Republic of the Congo	11.86	
	8	Phobay Kutu-Akoi	Liberia	DNS	
