= Athletics at the 2011 All-Africa Games – Women's 4 × 100 metres relay =

The women's 4 x 100 metres relay event at the 2011 All-Africa Games was held on 13 September.

== Results ==
Rank	Nation	Athletes	Time	Notes
1st place, gold medalist(s)	Nigeria	Gloria Asumnu, Agnes Osazuwa, Damola Osayomi, Blessing Okagbare	43.34	
2nd place, silver medalist(s)	Ghana	?, ?, ?, ?	44.33	
3rd place, bronze medalist(s)	Cameroon	?, ?, ?, ?	45.00	
4	Madagascar	?, ?, ?, ?	45.61	
5	Burkina Faso	?, ?, ?, ?	46.85	
6	Mozambique	?, ?, ?, ?	47.95	
