= Millicent Ndoro =

Kenyan sprinter (born 1986)

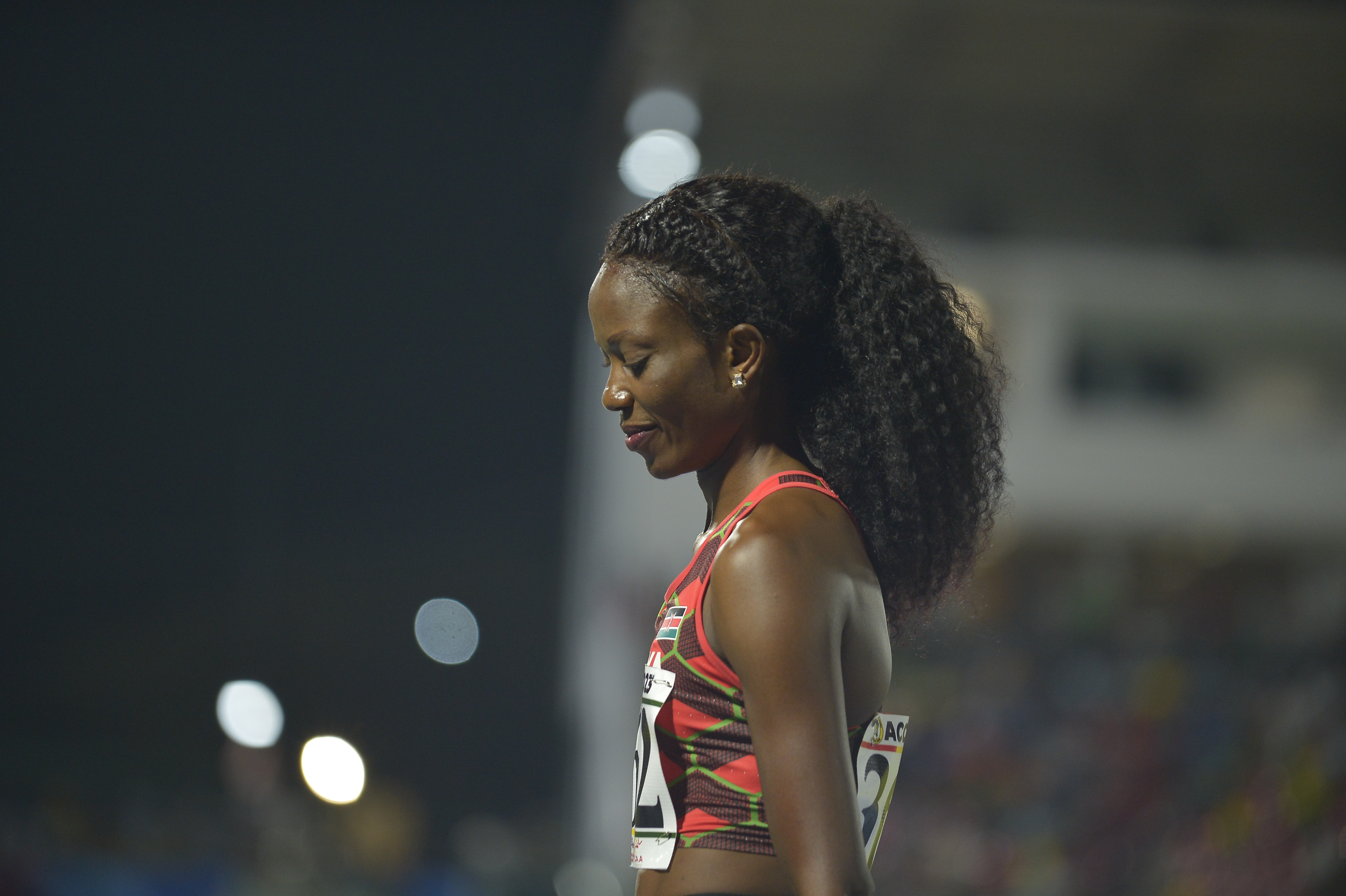
- Ndoro at the 2023 African Games

Personal information
- Born: 19 September 1986 (age 39) Kisii, Kenya
- Height: 1.67 m (5 ft 6 in)
- Weight: 60 kg (132 lb)

Sport
- Sport: Athletics
- Events: 100 m, 200 m
- Club: Police
Medal record
Women's athletics
Representing Kenya
African Championships
| Bronze medal – third place | 2018 Asaba | 4 × 100 m relay |
African Games
| Bronze medal – third place | 2019 Rabat | 4 × 100 m relay |

Millicent Ndoro (born 19 September 1986) is a Kenyan sprinter. She represented her country at four consecutive Commonwealth Games, starting in 2014 and the latest one being the 2026 Commonwealth Games in Glasgow. In 2019, she won the bronze medal in the women's 4 × 100 metres relay at the 2019 African Games held in Rabat, Morocco.

She is Kenyan national record co-holder in the 4 × 100 metres relay.

== International competitions ==
| Year | Competition | Venue | Position | Event | Notes |
Representing Kenya
| 2010 | African Championships | Nairobi, Kenya | 16th (sf) | 100 m | 12.38 |
| 2010 | African Championships | Nairobi, Kenya | 9th (h) | 200 m | 24.47 (Note: Did not start in the semifinals) |
| 2010 | African Championships | Nairobi, Kenya | 5th | 4 × 100 m relay | 46.53 |
| 2012 | African Championships | Porto-Novo, Benin | 15th (sf) | 100 m | 12.26 |
| 2012 | African Championships | Porto-Novo, Benin | 19th (h) | 200 m | 24.84 |
| 2014 | Commonwealth Games | Glasgow, United Kingdom | 32nd (h) | 100 m | 12.18 |
| 2014 | Commonwealth Games | Glasgow, United Kingdom | 28th (h) | 200 m | 24.84 |
| 2014 | Commonwealth Games | Glasgow, United Kingdom | 10th (h) | 4 × 100 m relay | 46.00 |
| 2014 | African Championships | Marrakesh, Morocco | 12th (sf) | 100 m | 12.09 |
| 2014 | African Championships | Marrakesh, Morocco | 14th (sf) | 200 m | 24.43 |
| 2014 | African Championships | Marrakesh, Morocco | 4th | 4 × 100 m relay | 46.06 |
| 2015 | African Games | Brazzaville, Republic of the Congo | 14th (sf) | 100 m | 11.98 |
| 2015 | African Games | Brazzaville, Republic of the Congo | 12th (sf) | 200 m | 24.09 |
| 2015 | African Games | Brazzaville, Republic of the Congo | 4th | 4 × 100 m relay | 44.75 |
| 2016 | African Championships | Durban, South Africa | 22nd (h) | 200 m | 24.75 |
| 2016 | African Championships | Durban, South Africa | 4th | 4 × 100 m relay | 46.00 |
| 2018 | Commonwealth Games | Gold Coast, Australia | 24th (sf) | 200 m | 24.42 |
| 2018 | African Championships | Asaba, Nigeria | 9th (sf) | 200 m | 24.24 |
| 2019 | World Relays | Yokohama, Japan | – | 4 × 200 m relay | DNF |
| 2019 | African Games | Rabat, Morocco | 11th (sf) | 200 m | 23.94 |
| 2019 | African Games | Rabat, Morocco | 3rd | 4 × 100 m relay | 45.44 |
| 2019 | African Games | Rabat, Morocco | 11th | Long jump | 5.82 m |
| 2022 | African Championships | Port Louis, Mauritius | 14th (sf) | 200 m | 24.01 |
| 2022 | African Championships | Port Louis, Mauritius | 4th | 4 × 100 m relay | 45.17 |
| 2022 | Commonwealth Games | Birmingham, United Kingdom | 28th (h) | 100 m | 11.76 |
| 2022 | Commonwealth Games | Birmingham, United Kingdom | 18th (sf) | 200 m | 23.87 |
| 2026 | African Championships | Accra, Ghana | 17th (sf) | 200 m | 24.39 |
| 2026 | Commonwealth Games | Glasgow, United Kingdom | 16th (sf) | 200 m | 23.37 (w) |

== Personal bests ==
Outdoor

- 100 metres – 11.40 (Nairobi 2026)
- 200 metres – 22.91 (Nairobi 2026)
