= 2015 IAAF World Relays – Women's 4 × 200 metres relay =

Women's 4 × 200 metres relay at the 2014 IAAF World Relays
- Venue: Thomas Robinson Stadium
- Dates: 2 May (final)
- Competitors: 32 from 8 nations
- Winning time: 1:30.52

Medalists
gold medal	Blessing Okagbare; Regina George; Dominique Duncan; Christy Udoh; Nigeria
silver medal	Samantha Henry-Robinson; Veronica Campbell-Brown; Shericka Williams; Sherone Simpson; Jamaica
bronze medal	Rebekka Haase; Anne Christina Haack; Nadine Gonska; Josefina Elsler; Germany

The women's 4 × 200 metres relay at the 2015 IAAF World Relays was held at the Thomas Robinson Stadium on 2 May.

== Records ==
Prior to the competition, the records were as follows:

World record	United States Blue (LaTasha Jenkins, LaTasha Colander, Nanceen Perry, Marion Jones)	1:27.46	Philadelphia, United States	29 April 2000
Championship record	United States (Shalonda Solomon, Tawanna Meadows, Bianca Knight, Kimberlyn Duncan)	1:29.45	(The Bahamas) Nassau, Bahamas	25 May 2014
World Leading	University of Technology Jamaica (Shimayra Williams, Chanice Bonner, Elaine Thompson, Shericka Jackson)	1:30.80	Philadelphia, United States	25 April 2015
African Record	Nigeria (Gloria Asumnu, Dominique Duncan, Ngozi Onwumere, Christy Udoh)	1:32.53	Philadelphia, United States	25 April 2015
Asian Record	Japan	1:35.90	Hamamatsu, Japan	4 November 1985
North, Central American and Caribbean record	United States Blue (LaTasha Jenkins, LaTasha Colander, Nanceen Perry, Marion Jones)	1:27.46	Philadelphia, United States	29 April 2000
South American Record	No official record			
European Record	East Germany (Marlies Göhr, Romy Müller, Bärbel Wöckel, Marita Koch)	1:28.15	Jena, East Germany	9 August 1980
Oceanian record	No official record			

== Schedule ==
Date	Time	Round
2 May 2014	21:40	Final

All times are local times (UTC−4)

== Results ==
KEY:	WL	World leading	AR	Area record	NR	National record	SB	Seasonal best

=== Final ===
The final was started at 21:47.

Rank	Lane	Nation	Athletes	Time	Notes
1st place, gold medalist(s)	4	Nigeria	Blessing Okagbare, Regina George, Dominique Duncan, Christy Udoh	1:30.52	WL, AR
2nd place, silver medalist(s)	3	Jamaica	Samantha Henry-Robinson, Veronica Campbell-Brown, Shericka Williams, Sherone Simpson	1:31.73	
3rd place, bronze medalist(s)	8	Germany	Rebekka Haase, Anne Christina Haack, Nadine Gonska, Josefina Elsler	1:33.61	SB
4	1	China	Yuan Qiqi, Kong Lingwei, Liang Xiaojing, Lin Huijun	1:34.89	AR
5	2	Ireland	Amy Foster, Stephanie Creaner, Sarah Lavin, Phil Healy	1:36.90	NR
	7	France	Brigitte Ntiamoah, Déborah Sananes, Jennifer Galais, Céline Distel-Bonnet	DNF	
	6	United States	Shalonda Solomon, Kimberlyn Duncan, Jeneba Tarmoh, Allyson Felix	DNF	
	5	Bahamas	Sheniqua Ferguson, Anthonique Strachan, Brianne Bethel, Shaunae Miller	DQ	170.7
