= 2012 African Championships in Athletics – Women's 4 × 100 metres relay =

The women's 4 x 100 metres relay at the 2012 African Championships in Athletics was held at the Stade Charles de Gaulle on 29 June.

== Medalists ==
Gold	Christy Udoh, Gloria Asumnu; Oludamola Osayomi, Lawretta Ozoh; Nigeria
Silver	Rosina Amenebede, Flings Owusu-Agyapong; Beatrice Gyaman, Janet Amponsah; Ghana
Bronze	Marie Josée Ta Lou, Amandine Allou Affoue; Mireille Parfaite Gaha, Adeline Gouenon; Ivory Coast

== Records ==
Standing records prior to the 2012 African Championships in Athletics
World record	Germany; Silke Gladisch, Sabine Rieger; Ingrid Auerswald, Marlies Göhr	41.37	Canberra, Australia	6 October 1985
African record	Nigeria; Beatrice Utondu, Faith Idehen; Christy Opara-Thompson, Mary Onyali-Omagbemi	42.39	Barcelona, Spain	7 August 1992
Championship record	Nigeria; Lawretta Ozoh, Agnes Osazuwa; Oludamola Osayomi, Blessing Okagbare	43.45	Nairobi, Kenya	30 July 2010
Broken records during the 2012 African Championships in Athletics
Championship record	Nigeria; Christy Udoh, Gloria Asumnu; Oludamola Osayomi, Lawretta Ozoh	43.21	Porto-Novo, Benin	29 June 2012

== Schedule ==
Date	Time	Round
29 June 2012	17:40	Final

== Results ==
=== Final ===
Rank	Lane	Nation	Athletes	Time	Notes
1st place, gold medalist(s)	7	Nigeria	Christy Udoh, Gloria Asumnu, Oludamola Osayomi, Lawretta Ozoh	43.21	CR
2nd place, silver medalist(s)	5	Ghana	Rosina Amenebede, Flings Owusu-Agyapong, Beatrice Gyaman, Janet Amponsah	44.35	
3rd place, bronze medalist(s)	8	Ivory Coast	Marie Josée Ta Lou, Amandine Allou Affoue, Mireille Parfaite Gaha, Adeline Gouenon	45.29	
4	6	South Africa	Tsholofelo Thipe, Claudia Viljoen, Rorisang Ramonnye, Ansulet Potgieter	45.56	
5	2	Benin	Charlenne Adjele, Benjamine Padonou, Rachidatou Zounon, Souliatou Saka	47.28	
6	5	Mali	Aminata Djegue Diakite, Safiatou Sissoko, Kadia Dembele, Rahamatou Dramé	48.67	
	3	Cameroon	Sergine Kouanga, Charlotte Mebenga, Fanny Appès Ekanga, Delphine Atangana	DNF	
