= 2012 African Championships in Athletics – Women's 200 metres =

The women's 200 metres at the 2012 African Championships in Athletics was held at the Stade Charles de Gaulle on 30 June and 1 July.

== Medalists ==
Gold	Gloria Asumnu; Nigeria
Silver	Lawretta Ozoh; Nigeria
Bronze	Marie Josée Ta Lou; Ivory Coast

== Records ==
Standing records prior to the 2012 African Championships in Athletics
World record	Florence Griffith Joyner (USA)	21.34	Seoul, South Korea	29 September 1988
African record	Mary Onyali (NGR)	22.07	Zürich, Switzerland	14 August 1996
Championship record	Falilat Ogunkoya (NGR)	22.22	Dakar, Senegal	22 August 1998

== Schedule ==
Date	Time	Round
30 June 2012	13:30	Round 1
30 June 2012	15:00	Semifinals
1 July 2012	15:55	Final

== Results ==
=== Round 1 ===
First 3 in each heat (Q) and 6 best performers (q) advance to the Semifinals.

Wind:
Heat 1: -0.1 m/s, Heat 2: -0.2 m/s, Heat 3: -0.1 m/s, Heat 4: 0.0 m/s, Heat 5: -0.2 m/s, Heat 6: +0.1 m/s

Rank	Heat	Lane	Name	Nationality	Time	Note
1	4	7	Lawretta Ozoh	Nigeria	23.44	Q
2	6	6	Tsholofelo Thipe	South Africa	23.45	Q
3	6	8	Gloria Asumnu	Nigeria	23.51	Q
4	3	3	Marie Josée Ta Lou	Ivory Coast	23.70	Q
5	2	2	Phobay Kutu-Akoi	Liberia	23.89	Q
6	4	2	Janet Amponsah	Ghana	23.90	Q
7	1	2	Tjipekapora Herunga	Namibia	23.98	Q
8	5	3	Lorène Bazolo	Republic of the Congo	24.30	Q
9	6	7	Beatrice Gyaman	Ghana	24.33	Q
10	3	4	Angele Cooper	Liberia	24.38	Q
11	1	3	Natacha Ngoye	Republic of the Congo	24.53	Q
12	4	5	Ahamada Feta	Comoros	24.56	Q, NR
13	1	8	Fanny Appès Ekanga	Cameroon	24.57	Q
14	3	2	Phumlile Ndzinisa	Swaziland	24.59	Q
15	5	4	Delphine Atangana	Cameroon	24.78	Q
16	2	3	Globine Mayova	Namibia	24.81	Q
16	1	5	Souliatou Saka	Benin	24.81	q
18	4	3	Mireille Parfaite Gaha	Ivory Coast	24.83	q
19	3	6	Millicent Ndoro	Kenya	24.84	q
20	5	7	Mary Jane Vincent	Mauritius	24.88	Q
21	3	8	Saruba Colley	Gambia	25.04	q
22	2	8	Tegest Tamagnu	Ethiopia	25.30	Q
23	1	7	Adeline Gouenon	Ivory Coast	25.33	q
24	2	6	Hinikissia Albertine Ndikert	Chad	25.42	q
25	3	5	Lydie Besme Hawa	Chad	25.51	
26	4	8	Prenam Pesse	Togo	25.54	
27	4	6	Benjamine Padonou	Benin	25.67	
27	6	2	Fanny Shonobi	Gambia	25.67	
29	1	4	Rebeca Ansoumana	Sierra Leone	25.86	
30	4	4	Chauzje Choosha	Zambia	26.09	
31	5	5	Abdusalam Halagezah	Libya	27.32	
	5	8	Fetiya Kedir	Ethiopia	DSQ	
	1	6	Racheal Nachula	Zambia	DNS	
	2	5	Rahma Mohammed	Eritrea	DNS	
	2	7	Ruddy Zang Milama	Gabon	DNS	
	2	4	Justine Zongo	Burkina Faso	DNS	
	3	7	Christy Odul	Nigeria	DNS	
	5	6	Vida Anim	Ghana	DNS	
	5	2	Alice Khan	Seychelles	DNS	
	6	4	Marie Gisele Eleme Asse	Cameroon	DNS	
	6	5	Ada Udaya	Liberia	DNS	
	6	3	Esfamaka Kargbo	Sierra Leone	DNS	

=== Semifinals ===
First 2 in each heat (Q) and 2 best performers (q) advance to the Final.

Wind:
Heat 1: -1.4 m/s, Heat 2: -0.5 m/s, Heat 3: -0.9 m/s

Rank	Heat	Lane	Name	Nationality	Time	Note
1	1	5	Gloria Asumnu	Nigeria	22.94	Q
2	1	4	Tsholofelo Thipe	South Africa	23.21	Q
2	3	6	Marie Josée Ta Lou	Ivory Coast	23.26	Q
4	3	4	Janet Amponsah	Ghana	23.49	Q
5	2	5	Lawretta Ozoh	Nigeria	23.53	Q
6	1	6	Tjipekapora Herunga	Namibia	23.59	q
7	1	7	Ahamada Feta	Comoros	24.08	q, NR
8	2	3	Globine Mayova	Namibia	24.13	Q
9	3	7	Fanny Appès Ekanga	Cameroon	24.23	
10	2	7	Beatrice Gyaman	Ghana	24.35	
11	2	4	Lorène Bazolo	Republic of the Congo	24.36	
12	3	8	Phumlile Ndzinisa	Swaziland	24.45	
13	1	3	Delphine Atangana	Cameroon	24.53	
14	3	5	Natacha Ngoye	Republic of the Congo	24.59	
15	1	8	Mary Jane Vincent	Mauritius	24.68	
16	1	1	Mireille Parfaite Gaha	Ivory Coast	24.87	
17	3	1	Saruba Colley	Gambia	24.90	
18	2	2	Souliatou Saka	Benin	24.95	
19	1	2	Hinikissia Albertine Ndikert	Chad	25.15	
20	2	8	Tegest Tamagnu	Ethiopia	25.50	
	2	1	Adeline Gouenon	Ivory Coast	DNS	
	2	6	Angele Cooper	Liberia	DNS	
	3	2	Millicent Ndoro	Kenya	DNS	
	3	3	Phobay Kutu-Akoi	Liberia	DNS	

=== Final ===
Wind: -0.7 m/s

Rank	Lane	Name	Nationality	Time	Note
1st place, gold medalist(s)	5	Gloria Asumnu	Nigeria	22.93	
2nd place, silver medalist(s)	3	Lawretta Ozoh	Nigeria	22.93	
3rd place, bronze medalist(s)	6	Marie Josée Ta Lou	Ivory Coast	23.44	
4	4	Tsholofelo Thipe	South Africa	23.66	
5	8	Janet Amponsah	Ghana	23.68	
6	2	Tjipekapora Herunga	Namibia	23.92	
7	7	Globine Mayova	Namibia	24.30	
8	1	Ahamada Feta	Comoros	24.61	
