= Fanny Appes Ekanga =

Cameroonian sprinter (born 1989)

Personal information
- Born: 9 June 1989 (age 37)
- Height: 1.70 m (5 ft 7 in)
- Weight: 60 kg (132 lb)

Sport
- Sport: Athletics
- Event: 100 metres
Medal record
Women's athletics
Representing Cameroon
African Championships
Silver medal – second place	2010 Nairobi	4×100 m

Fanny Laure Appes Ekanga (born 9 June 1989) is a Cameroonian former sprinter. She represented her country at the 2010 and 2018 Commonwealth Games.

Appes Ekanga served a two-year ban from 2015 to 2017 for an anti-doping rule violation after testing positive for clenbuterol.

== International competitions ==
Year	Competition	Venue	Position	Event	Notes
Representing Cameroon
2010	Commonwealth Games	Delhi, India	25th (h)	100 m	12.03
2010	African Championships	Nairobi, Kenya	12th (sf)	100 m	12.15
2010	African Championships	Nairobi, Kenya	2nd	4 × 100 m relay	44.90
2011	Universiade	Shenzhen, China	29th (qf)	100 m	12.12
2011	Universiade	Shenzhen, China	25th (qf)	200 m	24.72
2011	All-Africa Games	Maputo, Mozambique	8th	100 m	11.75 (w)
2011	All-Africa Games	Maputo, Mozambique	10th (sf)	200 m	24.79^{1}
2012	African Championships	Porto-Novo, Benin	12th (sf)	100 m	11.97
2012	African Championships	Porto-Novo, Benin	9th (sf)	200 m	24.23
2012	African Championships	Porto-Novo, Benin	–	4 × 100 m relay	DNF
2013	Universiade	Kazan, Russia	17th (sf)	100 m	12.23
2013	Jeux de la Francophonie	Nice, France	6th	100 m	12.03
2013	Jeux de la Francophonie	Nice, France	7th	4 × 100 m relay	47.23
2017	Jeux de la Francophonie	Abidjan, Ivory Coast	7th	100 m	11.88
2017	Jeux de la Francophonie	Abidjan, Ivory Coast	2nd	4 × 100 m relay	45.23
2018	Commonwealth Games	Gold Coast, Queensland	32nd (h)	100 m	12.15
2018	Commonwealth Games	Gold Coast, Queensland	6th	4 × 100 m relay	45.24
2019	African Games	Rabat, Morocco	27th (h)	200 m	24.39

^{1}Did not start in the semifinals

== Personal bests ==
Outdoor

- 100 metres – 11.39 (-1.1 m/s, Ghent 2014)
- 200 metres – 23.73 (+1.3 m/s, Brussels 2014)
- 400 metres – 56.84 (Oordegem 2017)

Indoor

- 60 metres – 7.45 (Ghent 2014)
