= 2010 African Championships in Athletics – Women's 4 × 100 metres relay =

The women's 4 x 100 metres relay at the 2010 African Championships in Athletics was held on July 30.

== Results ==
Rank	Lane	Nation	Competitors	Time	Notes
1st place, gold medalist(s)	3	Nigeria	Lawretta Ozoh, Agnes Osazuwa, Damola Osayemi, Blessing Okagbare	43.45	
2nd place, silver medalist(s)	5	Cameroon	Fanny Appes Ekanga, Charlotte Mebenga Amombo, Carole Made Kaboud Mebam, Delphine Atangana	44.90	
3rd place, bronze medalist(s)	5	Ghana	Rosina Amenebede, Elizabeth Amolofo, Beatrice Gyaman, Flings Owusu-Agyapong	45.40	
4	4	Ethiopia	Mantegbosh Melese, Fetiya Kedir, Leaynet Alemu, Fantu Magiso	46.46	NR
5	7	Kenya	Maryline Chelagat, Grace Miroyo Kidake, Catherine Nandi, Milcent Ndoro	46.53	
	2	Mauritius	Stephanie Guillaume, Mary Jane Vincent, Elodie Pierre Louis, Joanillia Januier	DNF	
