= 2014 African Championships in Athletics – Women's 100 metres =

The women's 100 metres event at the 2014 African Championships in Athletics was held August 10–11 on Stade de Marrakech.

== Medalists ==
Gold	Silver	Bronze
Blessing Okagbare; Nigeria	Murielle Ahouré; Ivory Coast	Marie-Josée Ta Lou; Ivory Coast

== Results ==
=== Heats ===
Qualification: First 3 of each heat (Q) and the next 4 fastest (q) qualified for the semifinals.

Wind: Heat 1: -0.3 m/s, Heat 2: -0.2 m/s, Heat 3: -0.5 m/s, Heat 4: +0.8 m/s

Rank	Heat	Name	Nationality	Time	Notes
1	4	Murielle Ahouré	Ivory Coast	11.36	Q
2	1	Marie-Josée Ta Lou	Ivory Coast	11.40	Q
3	2	Blessing Okagbare	Nigeria	11.42	Q
4	2	Pon Karidjatou Traoré	Burkina Faso	11.59	Q
5	3	Flings Owusu-Agyapong	Ghana	11.62	Q
6	3	Gloria Asumnu	Nigeria	11.68	Q
7	3	Nanzie Adeline Gouenon	Ivory Coast	11.74	Q
8	1	Lawretta Ozoh	Nigeria	11.75	Q
9	2	Beatrice Gyaman	Ghana	11.77	Q
9	4	Gemma Acheampong	Ghana	11.77	Q
11	2	Tegest Tamangnu	Ethiopia	11.82	q
12	1	Aminata Diakite	Mali	11.94	Q
13	2	Melissa Hewitt	South Africa	12.06	q
14	3	Millicent Ndoro	Kenya	12.08	q
15	4	Yvonne Nalishuwa	Zambia	12.17	Q
16	2	Elodie Embony	Madagascar	12.21	q
16	4	Safina Mukoswa	Kenya	12.21	q
18	1	Joanne Loutoy	Seychelles	12.22	
19	4	Labarang Charifa Benazir	Cameroon	12.24	
20	4	Assia Raziki	Morocco	12.27	
21	3	Irene Bell Bonong	Cameroon	12.31	
22	1	Beatrice Midomide	Benin	12.31	
23	3	Valerie Hounkpeto	Benin	12.43	
24	3	Ghita El Kafy	Morocco	12.52	
25	2	Ida Marlen Mevong Mba	Equatorial Guinea	12.54	
25	4	Neima Sefa	Ethiopia	12.54	
27	2	Felie Michele Mboyi	Republic of the Congo	12.57	
28	3	Senknsh Mengista	Ethiopia	12.86	
29	4	Fatimeta Doucouré	Mauritania	14.15	
	1	Hinikissia Albertine Ndikert	Chad	DNS	
	1	Marie Jeanne Eba	Cameroon	DNS	

=== Semifinals ===
Qualification: First 3 of each semifinal (Q) and the next 2 fastest (q) qualified for the final.

Wind: Heat 1: -0.3 m/s, Heat 2: +1.2 m/s

Rank	Heat	Name	Nationality	Time	Notes
1	1	Murielle Ahouré	Ivory Coast	11.19	Q
2	2	Blessing Okagbare	Nigeria	11.20	Q
3	2	Marie-Josée Ta Lou	Ivory Coast	11.25	Q
4	2	Gloria Asumnu	Nigeria	11.44	Q
5	1	Pon Karidjatou Traoré	Burkina Faso	11.53	Q
6	1	Lawretta Ozoh	Nigeria	11.58	Q
7	1	Nanzie Adeline Gouenon	Ivory Coast	11.75	q
8	2	Gemma Acheampong	Ghana	11.77	q
9	2	Beatrice Gyaman	Ghana	11.92	
10	1	Tegest Tamangnu	Ethiopia	11.95	
11	2	Melissa Hewitt	South Africa	11.98	
12	2	Millicent Ndoro	Kenya	12.09	
13	1	Yvonne Nalishuwa	Zambia	12.19	
14	2	Aminata Diakite	Mali	12.21	
15	1	Safina Mukoswa	Kenya	12.26	
16	1	Elodie Embony	Madagascar	12.32	
	1	Flings Owusu-Agyapong	Ghana	DQ	R162.5

=== Final ===
Wind: -1.4 m/s

Rank	Lane	Name	Nationality	Time	Notes
1st place, gold medalist(s)	6	Blessing Okagbare	Nigeria	11.00	CR
2nd place, silver medalist(s)	3	Murielle Ahouré	Ivory Coast	11.03	
3rd place, bronze medalist(s)	4	Marie-Josée Ta Lou	Ivory Coast	11.20	
4	7	Gloria Asumnu	Nigeria	11.49	
5	5	Pon Karidjatou Traoré	Burkina Faso	11.60	
6	2	Gemma Acheampong	Ghana	11.74	
7	8	Lawretta Ozoh	Nigeria	11.74	
8	1	Nanzie Adeline Gouenon	Ivory Coast	11.86	
