= Athletics at the 2015 African Games – Women's 4 × 100 metres relay =

The women's 4 × 100 metres relay event at the 2015 African Games was held on 16 September.

== Results ==
Rank	Lane	Nation	Athletes	Time	Notes
1st place, gold medalist(s)	5	Nigeria	Cecilia Francis, Blessing Okagbare, Ngozi Onwumere, Lawretta Ozoh	43.10	
2nd place, silver medalist(s)	7	Ghana	Flings Owusu Agyapong, Gemma Acheampong, Beatrice Gyaman, Janet Amponsah	43.72	
3rd place, bronze medalist(s)	2	Ivory Coast	Roswita Okou, Adeline Gouenon, Adjona Triphene Kouame, Marie Josée Ta Lou	43.98	
4	1	Kenya	Eunice Kadogo, Milicent Ndoro, Frasha Wangari, Maureen Nyatichi	44.75	NR
5	8	Zambia	Kabange Mupopo, Rhoda Njobvu, Yvonne Nalishuwa, Lumeka Katundu	44.97	NR
6	6	Cameroon	Germaine Abessolo Bivina, Irene Bell Bonong, Marie Jaine Eba, Marie Gisele Eleme Asse	45.27	
7	9	Mauritius	Amelie Anthony, Marie Amelie Alcindor, Marie Stephani Guillaume, Marie Joamilla Janvier	46.21	
8	3	Congo	Merveille Mezame, Audrey Eyamba, Michelle Mboyi, Marceline Bouele Bondo	46.40	NR
9	4	Sierra Leone	Esther Sheriff, Isfamaka Kargbo, Hawa Bundor, Mariama Koroma	48.59	
