= Pon-Karidjatou Traoré =

Burkinabé athlete

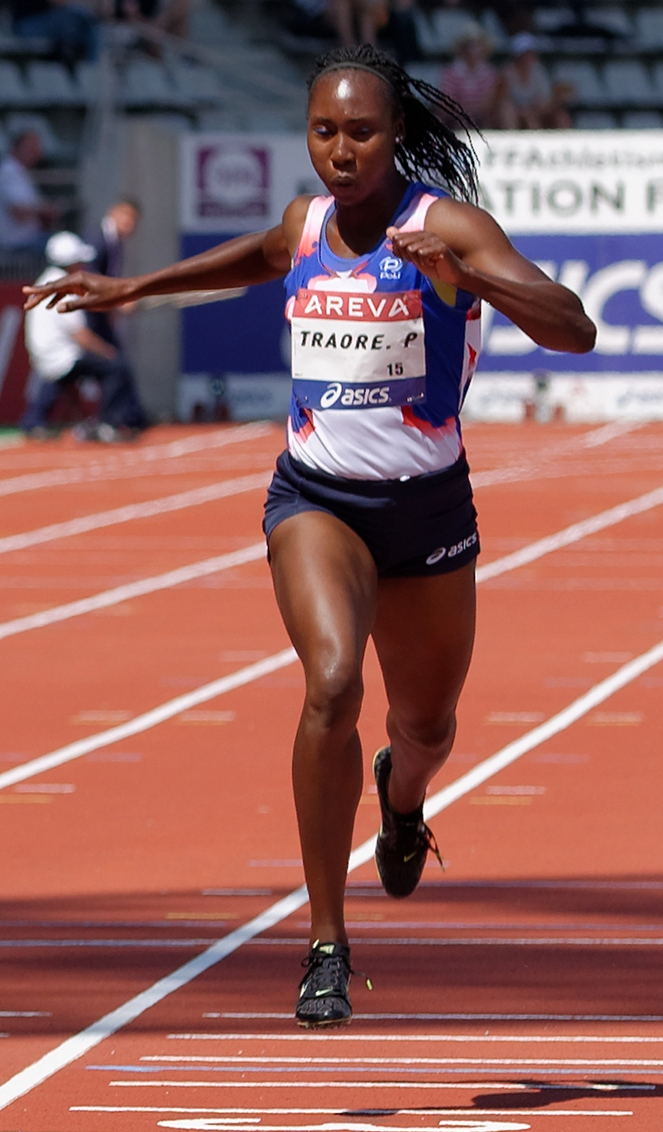
- Traoré in 2013

Personal information
- Nationality: Burkina Faso
- Born: 9 January 1986 (age 40)

Sport
- Sport: Athletics
- Event: Sprint
Medal record
Women's Athletics
Representing Burkina Faso
African Games
Bronze medal – third place	2015 Brazzaville	100 m
African Championships
Bronze medal – third place	2014 Marrakesh	4x100 m relay
- Updated on 26 August 2016

Pon-Karidjatou Traoré (born 9 January 1986) is a Burkinabé athlete specialising in the sprinting events. She won a bronze medal in the 100 metres at the 2015 African Games.

== Competition record ==
Year	Competition	Venue	Position	Event	Notes
Representing Burkina Faso
2005	African Junior Championships	Radès, Tunisia	4th	200 m	24.89
2005	African Junior Championships	Radès, Tunisia	3rd	4 × 100 m relay	49.01
2005	Jeux de la Francophonie	Niamey, Niger	10th (h)	200 m	25.33
2005	Jeux de la Francophonie	Niamey, Niger	3rd	4 × 100 m relay	45.99
2013	Jeux de la Francophonie	Nice, France	9th (h)	100 m	12.15
2013	Jeux de la Francophonie	Nice, France	7th	200 m	25.10
2014	African Championships	Marrakesh, Morocco	5th	100 m	11.60
2014	African Championships	Marrakesh, Morocco	3rd	4 × 100 m relay	44.06
2015	African Games	Brazzaville, Republic of the Congo	3rd	100 m	11.49
2015	African Games	Brazzaville, Republic of the Congo	8th (sf)	200 m	23.75

== Personal bests ==
Outdoor

- 100 metres – 11.47 (+1.7 m/s) (Castres 2015)
- 200 metres – 23.69 (+0.8 m/s) (Brazzaville 2015)

Indoor

- 60 metres – 7.48 (Aubiére 2014)
- 200 metres – 25.22 (Nogent-sur-Oise 2013)
