= Dominique Duncan =

American-Nigerian sprinter (born 1990)

Personal information
- Nationality: USA; Nigeria
- Born: Dominique Lynn Duncan; 7 May 1990 (age 36) Houston, Texas, U.S.

Sport
- Country: Nigeria
- Sport: Athletics
- Sprint: 100 m 200 m 4 × 100 m 4 × 200 m
- College team: Texas A&M University
- Turned pro: 2010

Achievements and titles
- Personal best(s): 100 m: 11.30 s (2012); 200 m: 22.82 s (2014)
Medal record
Women's athletics
Representing Nigeria
African Championships
Gold medal – first place	2014 Marrakesh	4×100 m
Bronze medal – third place	2014 Marrakesh	200 m
World Relays
Gold medal – first place	2015 Nassau	4×200 m

Dominique Lynn Duncan (born 7 May 1990) is an American-Nigerian sprinter who is eligible to compete for her home country Nigeria after switching allegiance from the United States of America in 2014. Dominique is a national and African record holder after she won gold alongside Blessing Okagbare, Regina George and Christy Udoh in the Women's 4 × 200 metres relay event at the 2015 IAAF World Relays in Nassau, Bahamas.

== Career ==
=== College ===
On 12 June 2009, Dominique alongside Khrystal Carter, Porscha Lucas and Gabby Mayo broke the NCAA Women's Division I Outdoor Track and Field Championships record in the 4 × 100 metres event after clocking 42.36s before she went on to win gold in the 4 × 100 metres relay event at the 2010 NCAA Division I Outdoor Track and Field Championships.

In 2012, Dominique claimed bronze in the 200 metres event at the 2012 NCAA Division I Outdoor Track and Field Championships.

=== 2014–present ===
After switching allegiance to Nigeria, Dominique competed at the 2014 African Championships in Athletics claiming bronze and gold at the 200 metres and 4 × 100 metres relay events respectively. She – alongside Blessing Okagbare, Regina George and Christy Udoh – won gold and set a new national record of 1:30.52s in the 4 × 200 metres relay event at the 2015 IAAF World Relays in Nassau, Bahamas.

== See also ==
- List of Nigerian records in athletics
- List of African records in athletics
