= Mercy Ntia-Obong =

Nigerian athlete

Personal information
- Nationality: Nigerian
- Born: 4 October 1997 (age 28)

Sport
- Sport: Athletics
- Event: Sprinting

Mercy Ntia-Obong (born 4 October 1997) is a Nigerian athlete. She competed in the women's 4 × 100 metres relay event at the 2019 World Athletics Championships.

In 2019, she won the gold medal in the women's 4 × 100 metres relay at the 2019 African Games held in Rabat, Morocco. She also competed in the women's 200 metres.
