= Mireille Parfaite Gaha =

Ivorian sprinter

Medal record

Women's athletics

Representing Ivory Coast

African Championships
Silver medal – second place	2014 Marrakesh	4×100 m
Bronze medal – third place	2012 Porto-Novo	4×100 m

Mireille Parfaite Gaha (born 18 December 1994) is an Ivorian sprinter who specializes in the 200 metres.

With the Ivory Coast 4 x 100 metres relay team she won a bronze medal at the 2012 African Championships, a silver medal at the 2014 African Championships and a gold medal at the 2017 Jeux de la Francophonie. Individually she reached the semi-final of the 200 metres at both the 2012 and 2016 African Championships. She then finished fourth in the final at the 2017 Jeux de la Francophonie.

Her personal best time is 23.60 seconds, achieved in July 2016 in Cape Coast, Ghana.
