= Athletics at the 2011 All-Africa Games – Women's 200 metres =

The Women's 200 metres at the 2011 All-Africa Games took place on 14–15 September at the Estádio Nacional do Zimpeto.

The final held at 6:55 p.m. local time.

== Medalists ==
Gold	Oludamola Osayomi (NGR)
Silver	Blessing Okagbare (NGR)
Bronze	Gloria Asunmu (NGR)

== Records ==
Prior to the competition, the records were as follows:

World record	Florence Griffith Joyner (USA)	21.34	Seoul, South Korea	29 September 1988
Games record	Fatima Yusuf (NGR)	22.45	Johannesburg, South Africa	September 1999
World Leading	Shalonda Solomon (USA)	22.15	Eugene, OR, United States	26 June 2011
African Record	Mary Onyali-Omagbemi (NGR)	22.07	Zürich, Switzerland	14 August 1996

== Schedule ==
Date	Time	Round
September 14, 2011	17:35	Heats
September 15, 2011	16:30	Semifinals
September 15, 2011	17:55	Final

== Results ==
KEY:	q	Fastest non-qualifiers	Q	Qualified	NR	National record	PB	Personal best	SB	Seasonal best

=== Heats ===
Qualification: First 3 in each heat (Q) and the next 3 fastest (q) advance to the semifinals.

Wind:
Heat 1: -0.8 m/s, Heat 2: -0.8 m/s, Heat 3: -1.7 m/s, Heat 4: -2.7 m/s

Rank	Heat	Name	Nationality	Time	Notes
1	1	Vida Anim	Ghana	23.85	Q
2	4	Globine Mayova	Namibia	24.31	Q
3	4	Endurance Abinuwa	Nigeria	24.36	Q
4	1	Gloria Asunmu	Nigeria	24.41	Q
5	2	Lorène Bazolo	Republic of the Congo	24.57	Q
6	2	Tjipekapora Herunga	Namibia	24.66	Q
7	3	Oludamola Osayomi	Nigeria	24.68	Q
8	2	Marie-Josée Ta Lou	Ivory Coast	24.69	Q
9	2	Ndzinisa Phumlile	Swaziland	24.74	q
10	4	Fanny Appès Ekanga	Cameroon	24.79	Q
11	2	Beatrice Gyaman	Ghana	24.82	q
12	3	Delphine Atangana	Cameroon	24.82	Q
13	3	Janet Amponsah	Ghana	24.84	Q
14	2	Marie Gisèle Elleme	Cameroon	24.98	q
15	3	Fetiya Kedir Hassen	Ethiopia	25.14	
16	1	Saruba Colley	Gambia	25.15	Q
17	3	Djénébou Danté	Mali	25.17	
18	1	Albertine Ndikert Hinikissia	Chad	25.36	
19	4	Justin Bayiga	Uganda	25.48	
20	2	Fatou Diabaye	Senegal	25.78	
21	1	Elodie Embony	Madagascar	25.94	

=== Semifinals ===
Qualification: First 2 in each heat (Q) and the next 2 fastest (q) advance to the final.

Wind:
Heat 1: +4.4 m/s, Heat 2: +2.8 m/s

Rank	Heat	Name	Nationality	Time	Notes
1	1	Oludamola Osayomi	Nigeria	23.37	Q
2	1	Vida Anim	Ghana	23.51	Q
3	1	Endurance Abinuwa	Nigeria	23.73	Q
4	2	Globine Mayova	Namibia	24.01	Q
5	2	Tjipekapora Herunga	Namibia	24.04	Q
6	2	Gloria Asunmu	Nigeria	24.05	Q
7	2	Beatrice Gyaman	Ghana	24.11	q
8	1	Marie-Josée Ta Lou	Ivory Coast	24.16	q
9	1	Ndzinisa Phumlile	Swaziland	24.24	
10	2	Lorène Bazolo	Republic of the Congo	24.31	
11	1	Delphine Atangana	Cameroon	24.34	
12	1	Fetiya Kedir	Ethiopia	24.34	
13	2	Janet Amponsah	Ghana	24.54	
14	1	Saruba Colley	Gambia	25.54	
	2	Marie Gisèle Elleme	Cameroon	DNS	
	2	Fanny Appès Ekanga	Cameroon	DNS	

=== Final ===
Wind: +1.9 m/s

Rank	Name	Nationality	Time	Notes
1st place, gold medalist(s)	Oludamola Osayomi	Nigeria	22.86	
2nd place, silver medalist(s)	Vida Anim	Ghana	23.06	
3rd place, bronze medalist(s)	Tjipekapora Herunga	Namibia	23.50	NR
4	Endurance Abinuwa	Nigeria	23.57	
5	Gloria Asunmu	Nigeria	23.81	
6	Marie-Josée Ta Lou	Ivory Coast	24.12	
7	Beatrice Gyaman	Ghana	24.15	
	Globine Mayova	Namibia	DNF	
