= Rosina Amenebede =

Ghanaian athletics competitor

Medal record

Women's athletics

Representing Ghana

African Championships
Silver medal – second place	2012 Porto-Novo	4×100 m
Bronze medal – third place	2010 Nairobi	4×100 m

Rosina Amenebede (born 24 December 1985) is a Ghanaian athlete specializing in 100-metre hurdles.

== Biography ==
Amenebede was born in 1985. She got her degree at Middle Tennessee State University in Community and Public Health, before becoming an assistant coach at UALR in 2013. She ran short distances for the Blue Raiders from 2011 to 2013. Amenebede has run in the Commonwealth Games, World Championships, African Championships, All-Africa Games and the World Junior Championships all for Ghana. These events have taken her all over the world, including trips to Asia, Australia, Africa and Hungary.

=== Titles ===
	Year	Competition	Position	Venue	Event
2006	African Championship	Bambous, Mauritius	5th	100 m hurdles	14 s 48
2007	African Games	Algiers, Algeria	6th	100 m hurdles	13 s 85
2010	African Championship	Nairobi, Kenya	DSQ (Note: Disqualified in final due to false start.)	100 m hurdles	—
2010	African Championship	Nairobi, Kenya	3rd	4 × 100 m	45 s 40
2010	Commonwealth Games	New Delhi, India	2nd	4 × 100 m	45 s 24
2012	Championnats d'Afrique	Porto-Novo, Benin	2nd	4 × 100 m	44 s 35

=== Personal records ===
	Race	Performance	Venue	Date
100 metres hurdles	13 s 85	Algiers, Algeria	20 July 2007	
