= Athletics at the 2019 African Games – Women's 4 × 100 metres relay =

The women's 4 × 100 metres relay event at the 2019 African Games was held on 27 and 28 August in Rabat.

== Medalists ==
Gold	Silver	Bronze
Nigeria; Joy Udo-Gabriel; Mercy Ntia-Obong; Jasper Bukola Adekunle; Rosemary Chukwuma; Blessing Okagbare*	South Africa; Tebogo Mamathu; Tamzin Thomas; Patience Ntshingila; Taylon Bieldt; Lynique Beneke*	Kenya; Maximila Imali; Milcent Ndoro; Maureen Nyatichi Thomas; Joan Cherono

*Athletes who competed in heats only

== Results ==
=== Heats ===
Qualification: First 3 teams of each heat (Q) plus the next 2 fastest (q) qualified for the final.

Rank	Heat	Nation	Athletes	Time	Notes
1	2	Nigeria	Joy Udo-Gabriel, Blessing Okagbare, Mercy Ntia-Obong, Rosemary Chukwuma	43.49	Q
2	2	Ghana	Flings Owusu-Agyapong, Gemma Acheampong, Persis William-Mensah, Halutie Hor	44.59	Q
3	2	Zambia	Agness Mazala, Lumeka Katundu, Hellen Makumba, Rhodah Njobvu	45.01	Q
4	1	South Africa	Tebogo Mamathu, Tamzin Thomas, Patience Ntshingila, Lynique Beneke	45.54	Q
5	1	Namibia	Globine Mayova, Beatrice Masilingi, Tjipekapora Herunga, Jolene Jacobs	45.61	Q
6	1	Kenya	Maureen Nyatichi Thomas, Milcent Ndoro, * Joan Cherono, Maximila Imali	45.75	Q
7	2	Madagascar	Sidonie Fiadanantsoa, Olga Razanamalala, Vanessa Embony, Claudine Njarasoa	45.82	q
8	1	Burkina Faso	Fatoumata Koala, Madina Toure, Rokia Fofana, Mariam Bance	46.41	q
9	1	Togo	Judith Koumedzina, Fayza Issaka, Prenam Pesse, Juliette Bouley	46.94	
10	2	Ethiopia	Eirehun Fayo, Worke Kumalo, Straj Sead, Abissie Kebede	47.91	
	1	Egypt		DNS	
	2	Ivory Coast		DNS	

=== Final ===
Rank	Lane	Nation	Athletes	Time	Notes
1st place, gold medalist(s)	3	Nigeria	Joy Udo-Gabriel, Mercy Ntia-Obong, Jasper Bukola Adekunle, Rosemary Chukwuma	44.16	
2nd place, silver medalist(s)	6	South Africa	Tebogo Mamathu, Tamzin Thomas, Patience Ntshingila, Taylon Bieldt	44.61	
3rd place, bronze medalist(s)	7	Kenya	Maximila Imali, Milcent Ndoro, Maureen Nyatichi Thomas, * Joan Cherono	45.44	
4	5	Namibia	Globine Mayova, Beatrice Masilingi, Tjipekapora Herunga, Jolene Jacobs	45.55	
5	2	Madagascar	Sidonie Fiadanantsoa, Olga Razanamalala, Vanessa Embony, Claudine Njarasoa	46.02	
6	1	Burkina Faso	Fatoumata Koala, Madina Toure, Rokia Fofana, Mariam Bance	46.77	
7	8	Zambia	Agness Mazala, Lumeka Katundu, Hellen Makumba, Rhodah Njobvu	47.16	
8	4	Ghana	Flings Owusu-Agyapong, Gemma Acheampong, Deborah Acquah, Halutie Hor	47.24	
