= Athletics at the 2011 All-Africa Games – Women's 100 metres =

The Women's 100 metres at the 2011 All-Africa Games took place on 11–12 September at the Estádio Nacional do Zimpeto.

The final held at 6:55 p.m. local time.

== Medalists ==
Gold	Oludamola Osayomi (NGR)
Silver	Blessing Okagbare (NGR)
Bronze	Gloria Asunmu (NGR)

== Records ==
Prior to the competition, the records were as follows:

World record	Florence Griffith-Joyner (USA)	10.49	Indianapolis, IN, United States	16 July 1988
Games record	Mercy Nku (NGR)	11.03	Johannesburg, South Africa	September 1999
World Leading	Carmelita Jeter (USA)	10.70	Eugene, OR, United States	4 June 2011
African Record	Glory Alozie (NGR)	10.90	La Laguna, Spain	5 June 1999

The Games record was broken by the gold medalist.

== Schedule ==
Date	Time	Round
September 11, 2011	9:50	Heats
September 12, 2011	18:55	Final

== Results ==
KEY:	q	Fastest non-qualifiers	Q	Qualified	NR	National record	PB	Personal best	SB	Seasonal best

=== Heats ===
Qualification: First 3 in each heat (Q) and the next 2 fastest (q) advance to the final.

Wind:
Heat 1: -1.1 m/s, Heat 2: +0.5 m/s, Heat 3: +1.4 m/s

Rank	Heat	Name	Nationality	Time	Notes
1	3	Blessing Okagbare	Nigeria	11.29	Q
2	2	Gloria Asunmu	Nigeria	11.40	Q
3	3	Marie Josée Ta Lou	Ivory Coast	11.56	Q
4	2	Vida Anim	Ghana	11.59	Q
5	1	Oludamola Osayomi	Nigeria	11.63	Q
6	1	Delphine Atangana	Cameroon	11.69	Q
7	3	Charlotte Mebenga	Cameroon	11.79	q
8	2	Fanny Appès Ekanga	Cameroon	11.86	q
9	1	Phobay Kutu	Liberia	11.88	
10	3	Flings Owusu Agyapong	Ghana	11.88	
11	1	Globine Mayova	Namibia	11.97	
12	1	Beatrice Gyaman	Ghana	11.99	
13	2	Estelle Rabotovao	Madagascar	12.10	
14	2	Anatercia Quive	Mozambique	12.11	
15	3	Mariette Mien	Burkina Faso	12.20	
16	2	Fetiya Kedir Hassen	Ethiopia	12.24	
17	3	Justin Bayiga	Uganda	12.33	
18	2	Saruba Colley	Gambia	12.39	
19	1	Albertine Ndikert Hinikissia	Chad	12.45	
20	1	Djénébou Danté	Mali	12.48	
21	1	Lorène Bazolo	Republic of the Congo	12.50	
22	2	Fernanda Joao Muquixt	Angola	13.28	
23	1	Bonko Camara Salif	Mauritania	14.20	

=== Final ===
Wind: +2.5 m/s

Rank	Name	Nationality	Time	Notes
1st place, gold medalist(s)	Oludamola Osayomi	Nigeria	10.90	
2nd place, silver medalist(s)	Blessing Okagbare	Nigeria	11.01	SB
3rd place, bronze medalist(s)	Gloria Asunmu	Nigeria	11.26	
4	Vida Anim	Ghana	11.37	
5	Delphine Atangana	Cameroon	11.56	
6	Charlotte Mebenga	Cameroon	11.62	
7	Marie Josée Ta Lou	Ivory Coast	11.66	
8	Fanny Appès Ekanga	Cameroon	11.75	
