= 2018 African Championships in Athletics – Women's 200 metres =

The women's 200 metres event at the 2018 African Championships in Athletics was held on 4 and 5 August in Asaba, Nigeria.

== Medalists ==
Gold	Silver	Bronze
Marie-Josée Ta Lou; Ivory Coast	Germaine Abessolo Bivina; Cameroon	Janet Amponsah; Ghana

== Results ==
=== Heats ===
Qualification: First 4 of each heat (Q) and the next 4 fastest (q) qualified for the semifinals.

Wind:
Heat 1: ? m/s, Heat 2: -0.5 m/s, Heat 3: -0.4 m/s, Heat 4: -0.3 m/s, Heat 5: ? m/s

Rank	Heat	Name	Nationality	Time	Notes
1	1	Germaine Abessolo Bivina	Cameroon	23.54	Q
2	5	Janet Amponsah	Ghana	23.66	Q
3	5	Natacha Ngoye Akamabi	Republic of the Congo	23.73	Q
4	1	Millicent Ndoro	Kenya	23.74	Q
5	5	Gina Bass	Gambia	23.78	Q
6	3	Halutie Hor	Ghana	23.83	Q
7	4	Marie-Josée Ta Lou	Ivory Coast	23.94	Q
8	3	Scovia Ayikoru	Uganda	24.00	Q
9	1	Praise Idamadudu	Nigeria	24.04	Q
10	1	Adeline Gouenon	Ivory Coast	24.24	Q
11	3	Tamzin Thomas	South Africa	24.28	Q
12	4	Margaret Barrie	Sierra Leone	24.39	Q
13	1	Leni Shida	Uganda	24.44	q
14	2	Hellen Syombua	Kenya	24.48	Q
15	3	Marian Bance	Burkina Faso	24.66	Q
16	5	Mariama Mamoudou Ittatou	Niger	24.69	Q
17	5	Jolene Jacobs	Namibia	24.69	q
18	5	Emefa Juliette Bouley	Togo	24.82	q
19	4	Souliatou Saka	Benin	24.99	Q
20	1	Eveline Sanches	Cape Verde	25.04	q
21	3	Suzanne Toti	Ivory Coast	25.20	
22	4	Ndeye Arame Toure	Senegal	25.21	Q
23	1	Faith Dube	Zimbabwe	25.24	
24	4	Irene Bell Bonong	Cameroon	25.39	
25	4	Eunice Kadogo	Kenya	25.54	
26	2	Hafsatu Kamara	Sierra Leone	25.56	Q
27	2	Seada Siraj	Ethiopia	25.78	Q
28	2	Dorcas Ndoye Nzafa	Central African Republic	26.46	Q
29	2	Hortense Noudjilar	Chad	27.76	
	1	Phumlile Ndzinisa	Eswatini	DNS	
	2	Persis William-Mensah	Ghana	DNS	
	2	Rosemary Chukwuma	Nigeria	DNS	
	3	Tjipekapora Herunga	Namibia	DNS	
	3	Bassant Hemida	Egypt	DNS	
	3	Blessing Okagbare	Nigeria	DNS	
	4	Debekang Blandine	Chad	DNS	

=== Semifinals ===
Qualification: First 2 of each semifinal (Q) and the next 2 fastest (q) qualified for the final.

Wind:
Heat 1: +0.1 m/s, Heat 2: +0.2 m/s, Heat 3: +0.1 m/s

Rank	Heat	Name	Nationality	Time	Notes
1	1	Marie-Josée Ta Lou	Ivory Coast	23.34	Q
2	2	Janet Amponsah	Ghana	23.55	Q
3	1	Gina Bass	Gambia	23.65	Q
4	1	Halutie Hor	Ghana	23.71	q
5	3	Natacha Ngoye Akamabi	Republic of the Congo	23.72	Q
6	2	Scovia Ayikoru	Uganda	23.76	Q
7	3	Germaine Abessolo Bivina	Cameroon	23.78	Q
8	3	Praise Idamadudu	Nigeria	23.92	q
9	3	Millicent Ndoro	Kenya	24.24	
10	1	Leni Shida	Uganda	24.36	
10	2	Hellen Syombua	Kenya	24.36	
12	1	Adeline Gouenon	Ivory Coast	24.41	
13	2	Marian Bance	Burkina Faso	24.45	
14	2	Souliatou Saka	Benin	24.46	
15	3	Ndeye Arame Toure	Senegal	24.65	
16	2	Emefa Juliette Bouley	Togo	24.75	
17	2	Hafsatu Kamara	Sierra Leone	25.01	
18	3	Mariama Mamoudou Ittatou	Niger	25.10	
19	3	Eveline Sanches	Cape Verde	25.45	
20	1	Seada Siraj	Ethiopia	26.04	
21	2	Dorcas Ndoye Nzafa	Central African Republic	26.72	
	1	Margaret Barrie	Sierra Leone	DNS	
	1	Jolene Jacobs	Namibia	DNS	
	3	Tamzin Thomas	South Africa	DNS	

=== Final ===
Wind: +0.1 m/s

Rank	Lane	Athlete	Nationality	Time	Notes
1st place, gold medalist(s)	6	Marie-Josée Ta Lou	Ivory Coast	22.50	
2nd place, silver medalist(s)	7	Germaine Abessolo Bivina	Cameroon	23.36	
3rd place, bronze medalist(s)	3	Janet Amponsah	Ghana	23.38	
4	4	Gina Bass	Gambia	23.40	
5	2	Halutie Hor	Ghana	23.49	
6	5	Natacha Ngoye Akamabi	Republic of the Congo	23.63	
7	8	Scovia Ayikoru	Uganda	23.66	
8	1	Praise Idamadudu	Nigeria	23.79	
