= Maximila Imali =

Kenyan sprinter (born 1996)

Personal information
- Nationality: Kenyan
- Born: 8 February 1996 (age 30)

Sport
- Sport: Sprinting
- Event: 400 metres

Maximila Imali (born 8 February 1996) is a Kenyan sprinter. She competed in the women's 400 metres at the 2017 World Championships in Athletics. In 2019, she won the bronze medal in the women's 4 × 100 metres relay at the 2019 African Games held in Rabat, Morocco. Imali is among the athletes to shift from competing in the 400m and 800m to the 100m and 200m due to World Athletics' regulations on testosterone levels for athletes with XY disorders of sex development in women's competition.
