= Nadine Gonska =

German sprinter

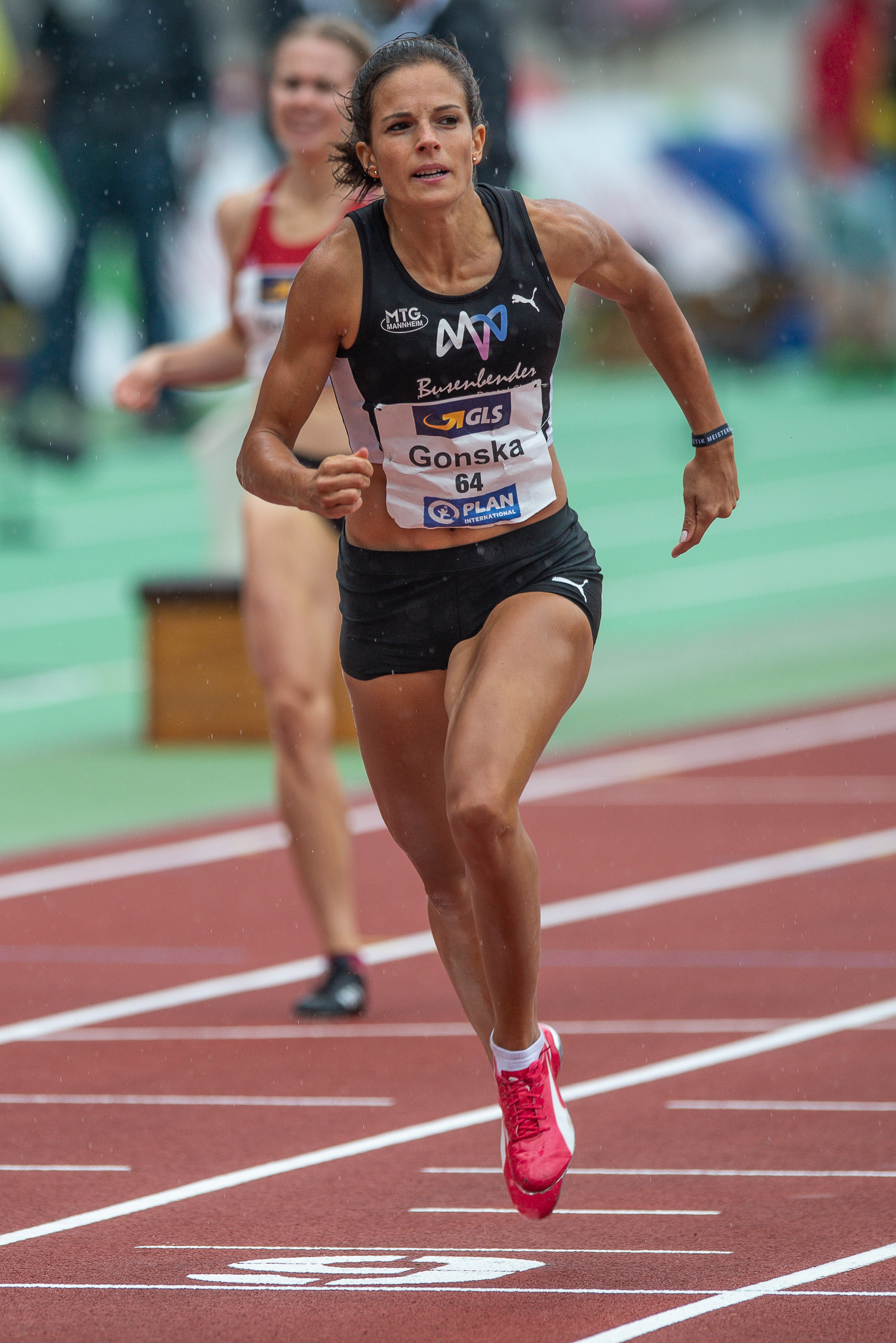
- Nadine Gonska (2018)

Personal information
- Nationality: German
- Born: 23 January 1990 (age 35) Duisburg, West Germany
- Height: 1.69 m (5 ft 7 in)
- Weight: 58 kg (128 lb)

Sport
- Country: Germany
- Sport: Track and field
- Event: 200 metres
- Club: MTG Mannheim

Nadine Gonska (born 23 January 1990) is a German sprinter. She competed in the 200 metres at the 2016 European Athletics Championships.

== International competitions ==
Year	Competition	Venue	Position	Event	Notes
Representing Germany
2015	World Relays	Nassau, Bahamas	3rd	4 × 200 m relay	1:33.61
2016	European Championships	Amsterdam, Netherlands	12th (sf)	200 m	23.24
2016	Olympic Games	Rio de Janeiro, Brazil	31st (h)	200 m	23.03
2017	European Indoor Championships	Belgrade, Serbia	6th	4 × 400 m relay	3:34.60
2017	World Championships	London, United Kingdom	6th	4 × 400 m relay	3:27.45
2018	World Indoor Championships	Birmingham, United Kingdom	14th (sf)	400 m	53.45
2018	European Championships	Berlin, Germany	15th (h)	400 m	52.54
2018	European Championships	Berlin, Germany	6th	4 × 400 m relay	3:30.33
2019	European Indoor Championships	Glasgow, United Kingdom	19th (h)	400 m	53.38
2021	World Relays	Chorzów, Poland	6th	4 × 400 m relay	3:33.00

== Personal bests ==
Outdoor

- 100 metres – 11.36 (+0.5 m/s, Flieden 2016)
- 200 metres – 23.03 (-0.5 m/s, Kassel 2016)

Indoor

- 60 metres – 7.28 (Leipzig 2016)
- 200 metres – 23.30 (Karlsruhe 2015)
