= Souliath Saka =

Beninese sprinter (born 1991)

Souliath Ajjouolakpe Saka (born 20 December 1991 in Benin) is a Beninese sprinter who specializes in the 200 and 400 metres.

At the 2007 African Junior Championships she won the bronze medal in the 200 metres and the silver medal in the 400 metres. She managed to reach the semi-final at the 2008 African Championships (200 m) the 2012 African Championships (both 200 m and 400 m), and the 2018 African Championships (200 m). She also competed at the 2005 Jeux de la Francophonie (400 m) and the 2009 Jeux de la Francophonie (200 m) without reaching the final.

In the 4 x 100 meters relay she finished fourth at the 2009 Jeux de la Francophonie, fifth at the 2012 African Championships and competed without finishing at the 2017 Jeux de la Francophonie.

In the 4 x 400 meters relay she finished fifth at the 2005 Jeux de la Francophonie, fifth at the 2009 Jeux de la Francophonie,

Her personal best times are 24.63 seconds in the 200 metres, achieved in June 2018 in Blois; and 54.76 seconds in the 400 metres, achieved in July 2018 in Albi.
