= 2018 African Championships in Athletics – Women's 4 × 100 metres relay =

The women's 4 × 100 metres relay event at the 2018 African Championships in Athletics was held on 3 August in Asaba, Nigeria.

== Results ==
Rank	Lane	Nation	Competitors	Time	Notes
1st place, gold medalist(s)	5	Nigeria	Joy Udo-Gabriel, Blessing Okagbare, Tobi Amusan, Rosemary Chukwuma	43.77	
2nd place, silver medalist(s)	2	Ivory Coast	Adeline Gouenon, Rosvitha Okou, Karel Elodie Ziketh, Marie-Josée Ta Lou	44.40	
3rd place, bronze medalist(s)	7	Kenya	Eunice Kadogo, Millicent Ndoro, Joan Cherono, Fresha Mwangi	45.58	
4	4	South Africa	Rose Xeyi, Tamzin Thomas, Ariane Nel, Lynique Beneke	45.63	
5	3	Cameroon	?, ?, Audrey Nkamsao, Ngouyaka Angounou	46.26	
6	6	Senegal	Adja Arrete Ndiaye, ?, ?, Ndeye Amy Tall	47.73	
7	1	Burkina Faso	?, ?, Rokia Fofana, ?	47.95	
8	8	Ethiopia	?, ?, Seada Siraj, Meseret Gudura	49.09	
	9	Zambia	Abygirl Sepiso, Rhoda Njobvu, Hellen Makumba, Majory Chisanga	DNF	
