= Adeline Gouenon =

Ivorian athlete (born 1994)

Personal information
- Nationality: Ivory Coast
- Born: 20 October 1994 (age 31)
- Education: St Mary's University

Sport
- Sport: Athletics
- Event: Sprint
Medal record
Women's athletics
Representing Ivory Coast
African Games
Bronze medal – third place	2015 Brazzaville	100 m
Bronze medal – third place	2015 Brazzaville	4x100 m
African Championships
Silver medal – second place	2014 Marrakesh	4×100 m
Silver medal – second place	2018 Asaba	4×100 m
Bronze medal – third place	2012 Porto-Novo	4×100 m
Bronze medal – third place	2016 Durban	4×100 m
- Updated on 26 August 2016

Nanzie Adeline Gouenon (born 20 October 1994) is an Ivorian athlete specialising in the sprinting events. She won several medals with her country's 4 × 100 metres relay.

== Competition record ==
Year	Competition	Venue	Position	Event	Notes
Representing Ivory Coast
2012	African Championships	Porto-Novo, Benin	17th (sf)	100 m	12.39
2012	African Championships	Porto-Novo, Benin	23rd (h)	200 m	25.33
2012	African Championships	Porto-Novo, Benin	3rd	4 × 100 m relay	45.29
2013	Jeux de la Francophonie	Nice, France	12th (h)	100 m	12.41
2013	Jeux de la Francophonie	Nice, France	5th	4 × 100 m relay	45.84
2014	African Championships	Marrakesh, Morocco	8th	100 m	11.86
2014	African Championships	Marrakesh, Morocco	2nd	4 × 100 m relay	43.99
2015	African Games	Brazzaville, Republic of the Congo	3rd	100 m	11.49
2015	African Games	Brazzaville, Republic of the Congo	15th (h)	200 m	24.08
2015	African Games	Brazzaville, Republic of the Congo	3rd	4 × 100 m relay	43.98
2016	World Indoor Championships	Portland, United States	33rd (h)	60 m	7.50
2016	African Championships	Durban, South Africa	11th (sf)	100 m	11.68
2016	African Championships	Durban, South Africa	8th (sf)	200 m	23.96^{1}
2017	Jeux de la Francophonie	Abidjan, Ivory Coast	9th (h)	100 m	12.01
2017	Jeux de la Francophonie	Abidjan, Ivory Coast	1st	4 × 100 m relay	44.22
2018	African Championships	Asaba, Nigeria	11th (sf)	100 m	11.92
2018	African Championships	Asaba, Nigeria	12th (sf)	200 m	24.41
2018	African Championships	Asaba, Nigeria	2nd	4 × 100 m relay	44.40

^{1}Did not start in the final

== Personal bests ==
Outdoor

- 100 metres – 11.49 (+0.6 m/s) (Brazzaville 2015)
- 200 metres – 24.08 (-0.5 m/s) (Brazzaville 2015)

Indoor

- 60 metres – 7.36 (Sheffield 2015)
- 200 metres – 24.19 (Sheffield 2015)
