= Janet Amponsah =

Ghanaian sprinter (born 1993)

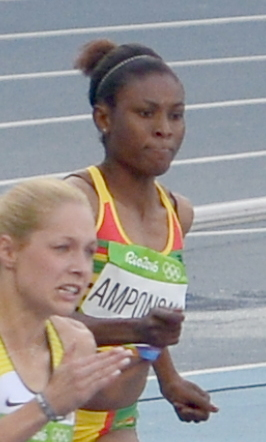
- Amponsah at the 2016 Olympics

Personal information
- Born: 12 April 1993 (age 33) Kumasi, Ghana
- Education: Middle Tennessee State University
- Height: 1.68 m (5 ft 6 in)
- Weight: 65 kg (143 lb)

Sport
- Country: Ghana
- Sport: Track and field
- Event(s): 100 m, 200 m
- Club: Middle Tennessee State University Blue Raiders
- Coached by: Dean Hayes
Medal record
Women's athletics
Representing Ghana
Commonwealth Games
Silver medal – second place	2010 Delhi	4x100 m
African Games
Silver medal – second place	2015 Brazzaville	4x100 m
African Championships
Silver medal – second place	2012 Porto-Novo	4×100 m
Silver medal – second place	2016 Durban	4×100 m
Silver medal – second place	2018 Asaba	100 m
Bronze medal – third place	2014 Marrakesh	4×100 m
Bronze medal – third place	2018 Asaba	200 m

Janet Amponsah (born 12 April 1993) is a Ghanaian sprinter. She represented her country at the 2013 World Championships without qualifying for the semifinals. She won medals in the 4 × 100 metres relay at two African Championships and at the 2010 Commonwealth Games. She was selected as Ghana's flag bearer at the opening ceremony of the 2014 Commonwealth Games and voted the 2015 Ghanaian Female Athlete of the Year. She missed the 2015 World Championships in China due to problems with her entry visa. At the 2016 Olympics, she competed in the 200 m and 4 × 100 m relay events.

She came second behind Ivorian Marie Josee Ta Louat at the 2018 women's 100m final at the African Senior Athletics Championships in Asaba, Nigeria.

== Competition record ==
Year	Competition	Venue	Position	Event	Notes
Representing Ghana
2008	African Championships	Addis Ababa, Ethiopia	5th	4 × 400 m relay	3:42.36
2010	World Junior Championships	Moncton, Canada	34th (h)	200 m	24.86
2010	Commonwealth Games	Delhi, India	23rd (sf)	100 m	12.03
2010	Commonwealth Games	Delhi, India	15th (sf)	200 m	24.44
2010	Commonwealth Games	Delhi, India	2nd	4 × 100 m relay	45.24
2011	All-Africa Games	Maputo, Mozambique	13th (sf)	200 m	24.54
2012	African Championships	Porto-Novo, Benin	6th	100 m	11.76
2012	African Championships	Porto-Novo, Benin	5th	200 m	23.68
2012	African Championships	Porto-Novo, Benin	2nd	4 × 100 m relay	44.35
2012	World Junior Championships	Barcelona, Spain	17th (sf)	100 m	11.94
2012	World Junior Championships	Barcelona, Spain	5th	200 m	23.41
2013	World Championships	Moscow, Russia	41st (h)	200 m	24.07
2014	African Championships	Marrakesh, Morocco	3rd	4 × 100 m relay	44.06
2014	African Championships	Marrakesh, Morocco	4th	4 × 400 m relay	3:42.89
2014	Commonwealth Games	Glasgow, United Kingdom	18th (h)	200 m	24.05
2015	African Games	Brazzaville, Republic of the Congo	4th	200 m	23.49
2015	African Games	Brazzaville, Republic of the Congo	2nd	4 × 100 m relay	43.72
2016	African Championships	Durban, South Africa	5th	200 m	23.45
2016	African Championships	Durban, South Africa	2nd	4 × 100 m relay	44.05
2016	Olympic Games	Rio de Janeiro, Brazil	60th (h)	200 m	23.67
2016	Olympic Games	Rio de Janeiro, Brazil	14th (h)	4 × 100 m relay	43.37
2017	World Championships	London, United Kingdom	37th (h)	200 m	23.77
2017	World Championships	London, United Kingdom	10th (h)	4 × 100 m relay	43.68
2018	Commonwealth Games	Gold Coast, Australia	17th (sf)	200 m	23.67
2018	Commonwealth Games	Gold Coast, Australia	5th	4 × 100 m relay	43.64
2018	African Championships	Asaba, Nigeria	2nd	100 m	11.54
2018	African Championships	Asaba, Nigeria	3rd	200 m	23.38
2021	World Relays	Chorzów, Poland	12th (h)	4 × 100 m relay	44.85

== Personal bests ==
Outdoor

- 100 metres – 11.29 (-1.3 m/s) (Canyon 2015)
- 200 metres – 23.04 (+1.6 m/s) (Canyon 2015)

Indoor

- 200 metres – 23.40 (Albuquerque 2015)
