= 2014 African Championships in Athletics – Women's 4 × 100 metres relay =

The women's 4 × 100 metres relay event at the 2014 African Championships in Athletics was held on August 12 at Stade de Marrakech in Marrakesh, Morocco.

== Results ==
=== Final ===
| Rank | Lane | Nation | Competitors | Time | Notes |
|---|---|---|---|---|---|
| 1st place, gold medalist(s) | 8 | Nigeria | Gloria Asumnu, Lawreta Ozoh, Dominique Duncan, Blessing Okagbare | 43.56 | |
| 2nd place, silver medalist(s) | 5 | Ivory Coast | Tryphene Kouame Adjoua, Mireille Gaha, Nanzie Adeline Gouenon, Marie-Josée Ta Lou | 43.99 | |
| 3rd place, bronze medalist(s) | 1 | Ghana | Flings Owusu-Agyapong, Gemma Acheampong, Beatrice Gyaman, Janet Amponsah | 44.06 | |
| 4 | 7 | Kenya | Millicent Ndoro, Jacinter Shikanda, Francisca Koki, Safina Mukoswa | 46.06 | |
| 5 | 3 | Cameroon | Labarang Charifa Benazir, Audrey Nkamsao, Germaine Abessolo Bivina, Marie Jeanne Eba | 46.33 | |
| 6 | 6 | Ethiopia | Neima Sefa, Senknsh Mengista, Med Gebremariam, Tegest Tamangnu | 46.67 | |
| 7 | 2 | Benin | Valerie Hounkpeto, Ariane Amouro, Rafiatou Idi, Beatrice Midomide | 48.11 | |
| | 4 | Senegal | Adja Arette Ndiaye, Mame Fatou Faye, Sokhna Safietou Kante, Fatoumata Diop | DNF | |
