= Beatrice Gyaman =

Ghanaian sprinter (born 1987)

Personal information
- Born: 17 February 1987 (age 39)
- Weight: 53 kg (117 lb)

Sport
- Country: Ghana
- Sport: Track and field
- Event: 4 × 100m relay
Medal record
Women's athletics
Representing Ghana
Commonwealth Games
Silver medal – second place	2010 Delhi	4x100 m relay
African Games
Silver medal – second place	2015 Brazzaville	4x100 m relay
African Championships
Silver medal – second place	2012 Porto-Novo	4×100 m
Silver medal – second place	2016 Durban	4×100 m
Bronze medal – third place	2010 Nairobi	4×100 m
Bronze medal – third place	2014 Marrakesh	4×100 m

Beatrice Gyaman (born 17 February 1987) is a Ghanaian track and field athlete specialising in the sprinting events. She has won medals in the 4 × 100 metres relay at three African Championships, as well as the 2010 Commonwealth Games.

== Education ==
Gyaman studied basic education at the University of Cape Coast.

== Competition record ==
Year	Competition	Venue	Position	Event	Notes
Representing Ghana
2010	African Championships	Nairobi, Kenya	14th (sf)	100 m	12.20
2010	African Championships	Nairobi, Kenya	3rd	4 × 100 m relay	45.40
2010	African Championships	Nairobi, Kenya	11th	Long jump	5.09 m
2010	Commonwealth Games	Delhi, India	20th (sf)	100 m	11.93
2010	Commonwealth Games	Delhi, India	2nd	4 × 100 m relay	45.24
2010	Commonwealth Games	Delhi, India	16th (q)	Long jump	5.65 m
2011	All-Africa Games	Maputo, Mozambique	12th (h)	100 m	11.99
2011	All-Africa Games	Maputo, Mozambique	7th	200 m	24.15
2012	African Championships	Porto-Novo, Benin	10th (sf)	200 m	24.35
2012	African Championships	Porto-Novo, Benin	2nd	4 × 100 m relay	44.35
2014	African Championships	Marrakesh, Morocco	9th (sf)	100 m	11.92
2014	African Championships	Marrakesh, Morocco	3rd	4 × 100 m relay	44.06
2014	Commonwealth Games	Glasgow, United Kingdom	–	4 × 100 m relay	DQ
2015	Universiade	Gwangju, South Korea	18th (sf)	100 m	11.81
2015	Universiade	Gwangju, South Korea	18th (sf)	200 m	24.52
2015	Universiade	Gwangju, South Korea	–	4 × 100 m relay	DNF
2015	African Games	Brazzaville, Republic of the Congo	7th	100 m	11.76
2015	African Games	Brazzaville, Republic of the Congo	2nd	4 × 100 m relay	43.72
2016	African Championships	Durban, South Africa	13th (sf)	100 m	11.84
2016	African Championships	Durban, South Africa	2nd	4 × 100 m relay	44.05
2016	Olympic Games	Rio de Janeiro, Brazil	14th (h)	4 × 100 m relay	43.37

== Personal bests ==
Outdoor

- 100 metres – 11.75 (+0.2 m/s) (Gwangju 2015)
- 200 metres – 24.15 (+1.9 m/s) (Maputo 2011)
- Long jump – 5.65 (+1.2 m/s) (New Delhi 2010)
