= Gloria Asumnu =

Nigerian sprinter (born 1985)

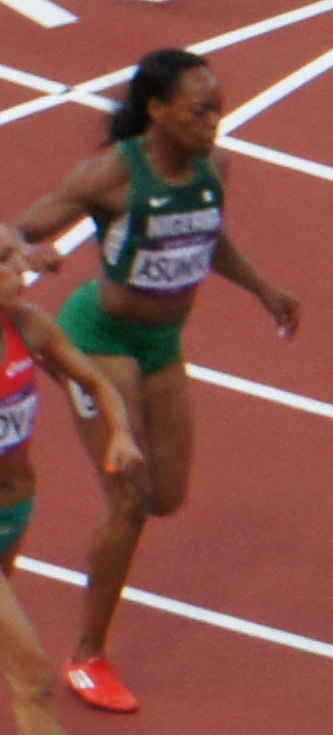

Personal information
- Born: 22 May 1985 (age 41) Houston, Texas, U.S.
- Height: 1.68 m (5 ft 6 in)
- Weight: 64 kg (141 lb)

Sport
- Country: Nigeria
- Sport: Athletics
- Event: 100 metres
Medal record
Women's athletics
Representing Nigeria
Commonwealth Games
Silver medal – second place	2014 Glasgow	4x100 m
All-Africa Games
Gold medal – first place	2011 Maputo	4x100 m
Bronze medal – third place	2011 Maputo	100 m
African Championships
Gold medal – first place	2012 Porto-Novo	200 m
Gold medal – first place	2012 Porto-Novo	4×100 m
Gold medal – first place	2014 Marrakesh	4×100 m
Bronze medal – third place	2012 Porto-Novo	100 m

Gloria Asumnu (born 22 May 1985) is a Nigerian sprinter. As she was born in the United States, she previously represented them in international competitions, before switching to represent Nigeria. She changed nationality in 2011, on her second application, the first having been denied by the IAAF.

She was born in Houston, Texas, ran for Alief Elsik High School and Tulane University.

== Achievements ==
Year	Competition	Venue	Position	Event	Notes
Representing Nigeria
2011	World Championships	Daegu, South Korea	7th	4 × 100 m relay	42.93
2011	All-Africa Games	Maputo, Mozambique	3rd	100 m	11.26
2011	All-Africa Games	Maputo, Mozambique	5th	200 m	23.81
2011	All-Africa Games	Maputo, Mozambique	1st	4 × 100 m	43.34
2012	World Indoor Championships	Istanbul, Turkey	6th	60 m	7.22
2012	African Championships	Porto-Novo, Benin	3rd	100 m	11.28
2012	African Championships	Porto-Novo, Benin	1st	200 m	22.93
2012	African Championships	Porto-Novo, Benin	1st	4 × 100 m relay	43.21
2013	World Championships	Moscow, Russia	23rd (sf)	100 m	11.44
2014	World Indoor Championships	Sopot, Poland	7th	60 m	7.18
2014	IAAF World Relays	Nassau, Bahamas	4th	4 × 100 m relay	42.67
2014	Commonwealth Games	Glasgow, United Kingdom	8th	100 m	11.41
2014	Commonwealth Games	Glasgow, United Kingdom	2nd	4 × 100 m relay	42.92
2014	African Championships	Marrakesh, Morocco	4th	100 m	11.49
2014	African Championships	Marrakesh, Morocco	5th	200 m	23.31
2014	African Championships	Marrakesh, Morocco	1st	4 × 100 m relay	43.56
2015	World Championships	Beijing, China	16th (h)	4 × 100 m relay	43.89
2016	African Championships	Durban, South Africa	4th	100 m	11.45
2016	Olympic Games	Rio de Janeiro, Brazil	38th (h)	100 m	11.55
2016	Olympic Games	Rio de Janeiro, Brazil	8th	4 × 100 m relay	43.21
