= Christy Udoh =

Nigerian sprinter

Medal record

Women's athletics

Representing Nigeria

African Championships
Gold medal – first place	2012 Porto-Novo	4×100 m

Christy Udoh is a Nigerian sprinter. At the 2012 Summer Olympics, she competed in the Women's 200 metres.

Udoh competed for the Texas Longhorns track and field team in the NCAA.
