= Oludamola Osayomi =

Nigerian sprinter (born 1986)

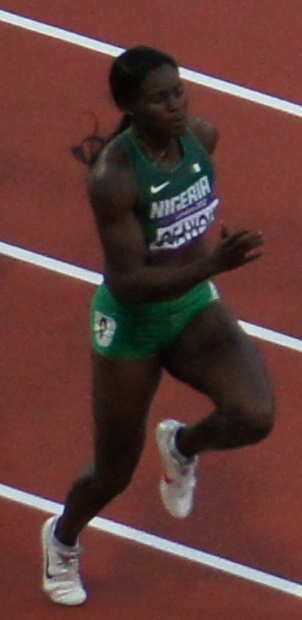
- Oludamola Osayomi at the 2012 Summer Olympics

Personal information
- Born: 26 June 1986 (age 40) Ilesha, Osun State, Nigeria
Medal record
Women's athletics
Representing Nigeria
Olympic Games
Silver medal – second place	2008 Beijing	4×100 m
African Championships
Gold medal – first place	2008 Addis Ababa	100 m
Gold medal – first place	2008 Addis Ababa	4×100 m
Gold medal – first place	2010 Nairobi	200 m
Gold medal – first place	2010 Nairobi	4×100 m
Gold medal – first place	2012 Porto-Novo	4×100 m
Bronze medal – third place	2008 Addis Ababa	200 m
Bronze medal – third place	2010 Nairobi	100 m
All-Africa Games
Gold medal – first place	2007 Algiers	100 m
Gold medal – first place	2007 Algiers	200 m
Gold medal – first place	2011 Maputo	100 m
Gold medal – first place	2011 Maputo	200 m
Gold medal – first place	2011 Maputo	4x100 m

Oludamola Bolanle ("Damola") Osayomi (born 26 June 1986) is a Nigerian sprinter who specializes in the 100 metres and 200 metres. She is a four-time gold medallist at the African Championships in Athletics and won an Olympic silver medal with Nigeria in the 4×100 metres relay at the 2008 Beijing Olympics. She also won the 100 and 200 m sprints at the 2007 All-Africa Games.

Her best for the 100 m is 10.99 seconds, set in São Paulo in 2011. She studied business administration at the University of Texas at El Paso and represented the school in athletics in 2006. She was the original winner of the 100 m at the 2010 Commonwealth Games but was stripped of her title and banned after her doping test came back positive for the stimulant methylhexanamine.

== Career ==
Osayomi's first international appearance for Nigeria came at the 2003 World Youth Championships in Athletics where she was a semi-finalist in both the 100 m and 200 metres. She began to compete in senior competitions the following year as part of the Nigerian 4×100 metres relay team. On her Olympic debut, her team came seventh in the women's final at the 2004 Athens Olympics and the team repeated that position at the 2005 World Championships in Athletics the next year. Osayomi proved herself individually at the 2007 All-Africa Games by taking a 100/200 m gold medal double before helping the relay team to the silver medal. On her world 100 m debut at the 2007 World Championships in Athletics, she made her way into the final round (finishing eighth) and set a personal best of 11.15 seconds in the heats. The Nigerian women did not reach the relay final on that occasion.

She opened the 2008 indoor season with a personal best of 7.19 seconds in the 60 metres and went on finish sixth in the final of that event at the 2008 IAAF World Indoor Championships. At the 2008 African Championships in Athletics she became a double continental champion, winning golds in the 100 m individual and relay races, as well as taking a bronze medal in the 200 m. Two personal bests came at that year's Nigerian Championships, as she claimed the 100 m title in 11.08 seconds (also a meet record) and won the 200 m in 22.74 seconds (half a second ahead of runner-up Gloria Kemasuode). This gained her the opportunity to represent Nigeria at the 2008 Summer Olympics in Beijing. She was a 100 m semi-finalist and a 200 m quarter-finalist. Together with Kemasuode, Agnes Osazuwa and Ene Franca Idoko she also took part in the 4×100 m relay. In their first round heat they placed fourth and reached the final as the fastest non-qualifiers. Osazuwa was replaced with Halimat Ismaila for the final team and they sprinted to a time of 43.04 seconds, taking third place and a bronze medal behind Russia and Belgium. In 2016, the Russian team was disqualified and stripped of their gold medal due to doping violations by one of the Russian runners, Yuliya Chermoshanskaya, thereby promoting Nigeria to the silver medal position.

She was not in the same form in the 2009 season; she was eliminated in the heats stage of the sprints and relay at the 2009 World Championships in Athletics and her season's bests of 11.31 and 23.41 seconds, both set at the FBK Games, were much slower than the previous year. In 2011, her fastest times of the year came at the 2010 African Championships in Athletics, where she won the 200 m, took the 100 m bronze, and set a Championships record in the relay alongside Blessing Okagbare. She was selected to represent Africa at the 2010 IAAF Continental Cup and following a fifth place in the 200 m, she won a relay bronze medal in a team comprising the top four 100 m runners from the African Championships (Gabon's Ruddy Zang Milama and her compatriots Osazuwa and Okagbare).

At the 2010 Commonwealth Games in New Delhi, Osayomi won the women's 100 metres but lost her gold medal after her B sample tested positive for methylhexanamine, which has only been recently added to the World Anti-Doping Agency's prohibited list. Ironically, before being banned she had said: "I don't know why they allow people to participate in the competition if they cannot follow the rules."

== Achievements ==
Year	Competition	Venue	Position	Event	Notes
Representing Nigeria
2004	Olympic Games	Athens, Greece	7th	4 × 100 m relay	
2005	World Championships	Helsinki, Finland	7th	4 × 100 m relay	
2007	World Championships	Osaka, Japan	8th	100 m	
2007	World Championships	Osaka, Japan	6th (heats)	4 × 100 m relay	
2007	All-Africa Games	Algiers, Algeria	1st	100 m	
2007	All-Africa Games	Algiers, Algeria	1st	200 m	
2007	All-Africa Games	Algiers, Algeria	2nd	4 × 100 m relay	
2008	World Indoor Championships	Valencia, Spain	6th	60 m	
2008	African Championships	Addis Ababa, Ethiopia	1st	100 m	11.22
2008	African Championships	Addis Ababa, Ethiopia	3rd	200 m	
2008	African Championships	Addis Ababa, Ethiopia	1st	4 × 100 m relay	
2008	Olympic Games	Beijing, China	8th (semis)	100 m	
2008	Olympic Games	Beijing, China	6th (quarter-finals)	200 m	
2008	Olympic Games	Beijing, China	2nd	4 × 100 m relay	43.04 s
2009	World Championships	Berlin, Germany	6th (q-finals)	100 m	
2009	World Championships	Berlin, Germany	8th (heats)	200 m	
2009	World Championships	Berlin, Germany	6th (heats)	4 × 100 m relay	
2010	African Championships	Nairobi, Kenya	3rd	100 m	
2010	African Championships	Nairobi, Kenya	1st	200 m	
2010	African Championships	Nairobi, Kenya	1st	4 × 100 m relay	
2010	Continental Cup	Split, Croatia	5th	200 m	
2010	Continental Cup	Split, Croatia	3rd	4 × 100 m relay	
2010	Commonwealth Games	New Delhi, India	DQ	100 m	
2010	Commonwealth Games	New Delhi, India	4th (semis)	200 m	
2011	World Championships	Daegu, South Korea	21st (sf)	100 m	11.58
2011	World Championships	Daegu, South Korea	6th	4 × 100 m relay	42.93
2011	All-Africa Games	Maputo, Mozambique	1st	100 m	10.90 (GR)
2011	All-Africa Games	Maputo, Mozambique	1st	200 m	22.86

=== Personal bests ===
- 60 metres - 7.19 s (2008, indoor)
- 100 metres - 10.99 s (2011, São Paulo (IDCM))
- 200 metres - 22.74 s (2008, Abuja)

== See also ==
- List of doping cases in athletics
