= Alice Khan =

Seychellois sprinter

Personal information
- Nationality: Seychellois
- Born: 5 March 1990 (age 35)

Sport
- Sport: Sprinting
- Event: 100 metres

Alice Khan (born 5 March 1990) is a Seychellois sprinter. In 2009, she competed in the women's 100 metres at the 2009 World Championships in Athletics held in Berlin, Germany. She did not advance to compete in the quarter-finals.
