= 2010 African Championships in Athletics =

African championships in Athletics

2010 African Championships
- Dates: 28 July – 1 August
- Host city: Nairobi, Kenya
- Venue: Nyayo Stadium
- Events: 44
- Participation: 587 athletes from 46 nations
- Records set: 6 Championship records

The 2010 African Championships in Athletics was held in Nairobi, Kenya from, 28 July to 1 August 2010.

== Background ==
The African Championships in Athletics were held in Kenya for the first time. Previously two major athletics events have been held in Kenya, namely 1987 All-Africa Games and 2007 IAAF World Cross Country Championships.

== Preparations ==
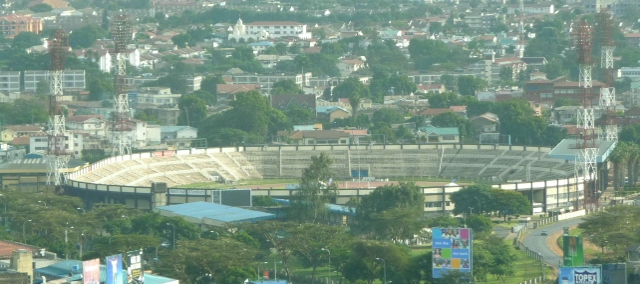
The host stadium in Nairobi

The championships were awarded to Kenya at the April 2007 Confederation of African Athletics Congress in Dakar, Senegal.

The event was originally scheduled to be held from April 28 to May 2, 2010, but due to delayed preparations the event was moved forward. The Moi International Sports Centre was initially set to become the host venue, but it was later changed to the smaller Nyayo Stadium.

== Men's results ==
=== Track ===
Chronology: 2006 | 2008 | 2010 | 2012 | 2014

Event	Gold		Silver		Bronze	
100 m	Ben-Youssef Méité; Ivory Coast	10.08 PB	Abdul Aziz Zakari; Ghana	10.12 SB	Simon Magakwe; South Africa	10.14 SB
200 m	Amr Ibrahim Mostafa Seoud; Egypt	20.36 NR	Ben-Youssef Méité; Ivory Coast	20.39 SB	Simon Magakwe; South Africa	20.56
400 m	Mohamed Khouaja; Libya	44.98 NR	Rabah Yousif; Sudan	45.18	Gary Kikaya; Democratic Republic of the Congo	45.28
800 m	David Rudisha; Kenya	1:42.84 CR	Alfred Kirwa Yego; Kenya	1:44.85 SB	Jackson Kivuva; Kenya	1:45.47 SB
1500 m	Asbel Kiprop; Kenya	3:36.19 CR	Amine Laâlou; Morocco	3:36.38	Mekonnen Gebremedhin; Ethiopia	3:36.65
5000 m	Edwin Soi; Kenya	13:30.46 SB	Vincent Yator; Kenya	13:30.53 SB	Mark Kiptoo; Kenya	13:32.45 SB
10,000 m	Wilson Kiprop; Kenya	27:32.91	Moses Kipsiro; Uganda	27:33.37	Geoffrey Mutai; Kenya	27:33.83
110 m hurdles	Othmane Hadj Lazib; Algeria	13.77	Selim Nurudeen; Nigeria	13.83	Ruan de Vries; South Africa	13.98
400 m hurdles	L. J. van Zyl; South Africa	48.51 SB	Cornel Fredericks; South Africa	48.79 SB	Mamadou Kasse Hann; Senegal	49.10 SB
3000 m steeplechase	Richard Mateelong; Kenya	8:23.54	Ezekiel Kemboi; Kenya	8:26.13	Roba Gary Chubeta; Ethiopia	8:27.15
20 km walk	Hassanine Sebei; Tunisia	1:20:36 CR	David Kimutai Rotich; Kenya	1:21:07 SB	Hichem Medjeber; Algeria	1:22:53 PB
4 × 100 m relay	Hannes Dreyer; Simon Magakwe; Lehann Fourie; Thuso Mpuang; South Africa	39.12	Fred Agbaje; Benjamin Adukwu; Ogho-Oghene Egwero; Obinna Metu; Nigeria	39.22	Emmanuel Kubi; Nana Kofi Sanah; Godwin Hukporti; Aziz Zakari; Ghana	39.31
4 × 400 m relay	Geoffrey Ngeno; Vincent Koskei; Julius Kirwa; Mark Mutai; Kenya	3:02.96	Isaac Makwala; Thapelo Ketlogetswe; Pako Seribe; Obakeng Ngwigwa; Botswana	3:05.16	Saul Weigopwa; James Godday; Tobi Ogunmola; Isah Salihu; Nigeria	3:06.53
WR world record | AR area record | CR championship record | GR games record | NR national record | OR Olympic record | PB personal best | SB season best | WL world leading (in a given season)

=== Field ===
Chronology: 2006 | 2008 | 2010 | 2012 | 2014

Event	Gold		Silver		Bronze	
High jump	Kabelo Kgosiemang; Botswana	2.19	Bong Matogno; Cameroon	2.15 SB	Fernand Djoumessi; Cameroon; Mohamed Idris; Sudan	2.15
Pole vault	Hamdi Dhouibi; Tunisia	4.70	Larbi Bouraada; Algeria	4.60	Mourad Souissi; Algeria	4.40
Long jump	Godfrey Khotso Mokoena; South Africa	8.23 SB	Ndiss Kaba Badji; Senegal	8.10	Stanley Gbagbeke; Nigeria	8.06
Triple jump	Tosin Oke; Nigeria	17.22	Hugo Mamba-Schlick; Cameroon	16.78 SB	Tumelo Thagane; South Africa	16.64
Shot put	Burger Lambrechts; South Africa	18.63	Roelof Potgieter; South Africa	18.62	Orazio Cremona; South Africa	18.27
Discus throw	Omar Ahmed El Ghazaly; Egypt	59.30	Yasser Ibrahim Farag; Egypt	58.71	Victor Hogan; South Africa	58.11
Hammer throw	Mohsen Mohamed Anani; Egypt	74.72	Chris Harmse; South Africa	72.56	Mostafa Al-Gamel; Egypt	71.40
Javelin throw	Ihab Al Sayed Abdelrahman; Egypt	78.02 SB	Gerhardus Pienaar; South Africa	75.96	Julius Yego; Kenya	74.51 SB
Decathlon	Larbi Bouraada; Algeria	8148 CR	Mourad Souissi; Algeria	7818 PB	Guillaume Thierry; Mauritius	7100
WR world record | AR area record | CR championship record | GR games record | NR national record | OR Olympic record | PB personal best | SB season best | WL world leading (in a given season)

== Women's results ==
=== Track ===
Chronology: 2006 | 2008 | 2010 | 2012 | 2014

Event	Gold		Silver		Bronze	
100 m	Blessing Okagbare; Nigeria	11.03 CR	Ruddy Zang Milama; Gabon	11.15 NR	Oludamola Osayomi; Nigeria	11.22 SB
200 m	Oludamola Osayomi; Nigeria	23.36 SB	Estie Wittstock; South Africa	23.50 SB	Ruddy Zang Milama; Gabon	23.59 PB
400 m	Amantle Montsho; Botswana	50.03 SB	Amy Mbacké Thiam; Senegal	51.32 SB	Shade Abugan; Nigeria	51.63
800 m	Zahra Bouras; Algeria	2:00.22	Janeth Jepkosgei; Kenya	2:00.50	Malika Akkaoui; Morocco	2:01.01 PB
1500 m	Nancy Jebet Lagat; Kenya	4:10.43	Gelete Burka Bati; Ethiopia	4:11.12	Btissam Lakhouad; Morocco	4:11.81
5000 m	Vivian Cheruiyot; Kenya	16:18.72	Meseret Defar; Ethiopia	16:20.54	Sentayehu Ejigu; Ethiopia	16:22.32
10,000 m	Tirunesh Dibaba; Ethiopia	31:51.39	Meselech Melkamu; Ethiopia	31:55.50	Linet Masai; Kenya	31:59.36 SB
100 m hurdles	Seun Adigun; Nigeria	13.14 SB	Gnima Faye; Senegal	13.67	Amina Ferguen; Algeria	13.87
400 m hurdles	Hayat Lambarki; Morocco	55.96 PB	Ajoke Odumosu; Nigeria	55.97	Maureen Jelagat Maiyo; Kenya	56.74 SB
3000 m steeplechase	Milcah Chemos Cheywa; Kenya	9:32.18 CR	Sofia Assefa; Ethiopia	9:32.58	Lydiah Rotich; Kenya	9:37.32 SB
20 km walk	Grace Wanjiru Njue; Kenya	1:34:19 AR	Chaima Trabelsi; Tunisia	1:35:33	Aynalem Eshetu Shefrawe; Ethiopia	1:41:46 SB
4 × 100 m relay	Lawretta Ozoh; Agnes Osazuwa; Damola Osayomi; Blessing Okagbare; Nigeria	43.45 CR	Fanny Appes Ekanga; Charlotte Mebenga Amombo; Carole Made Kaboud Mebam; Delphine Atangana; Cameroon	44.90	Rosina Amenebede; Elizabeth Amolofo; Beatrice Gyaman; Flings Owusu-Agyapong; Ghana	45.40
4 × 400 m relay	Shade Abugan; Margaret Etim; Bukola Abogunloko; Ajoke Odumosu; Nigeria	3:29.26	Grace Miroyo Kidake; Catherine Nandi; Maureen Jelagat Maiyo; Janeth Jepkosgei; Kenya	3:35.12	Ndeye Fatou Soumah; Fatou Diabaye; Marietou Badji; Amy Mbacké Thiam; Senegal	3:35.55
WR world record | AR area record | CR championship record | GR games record | NR national record | OR Olympic record | PB personal best | SB season best | WL world leading (in a given season)

=== Field ===
Chronology: 2006 | 2008 | 2010 | 2012 | 2014

Event	Gold		Silver		Bronze	
High jump	Selloane Tsoaeli; Lesotho	1.75	Lissa Labiche; Seychelles	1.70	Cherotich Koech; Kenya	1.55
Pole vault	Nisrine Dinar; Morocco	3.70	Laetitia Berthier; Burundi	3.50	Sinali Alima Outtara; Ivory Coast	3.40
Long jump	Blessing Okagbare; Nigeria	6.62	Comfort Onyali; Nigeria	6.42	Jamaa Chnaik; Morocco	6.30
Triple jump	Sarah Nambawa; Uganda	13.95 NR	Nkurika Domeke; Nigeria	13.71 SB	Otonye Iworima; Nigeria	13.65 SB
Shot put	Mirian Ibekwe; Nigeria	13.67	Priscilla Isiao; Kenya	13.62 SB	Doris Ratsimbazafy; Madagascar	13.56
Discus throw	Elizna Naude; South Africa	56.74	Kazai Suzanne Kragbe; Ivory Coast	55.53	Sarah Hasseib Dardiri; Egypt	46.51
Hammer throw	Amy Sène; Senegal	64.11 NR	Marwa Hussein; Egypt	62.36 SB	Florence Ezeh; Togo	57.94 NR
Javelin throw	Sunette Viljoen; South Africa	63.33	Justine Robbeson; South Africa	60.24	Hana'a Hassan Omar; Egypt	55.14
Heptathlon	Margaret Simpson; Ghana	6031 CR	Janet Wienand; South Africa	5500	Selloane Tsoaeli; Lesotho	5302
WR world record | AR area record | CR championship record | GR games record | NR national record | OR Olympic record | PB personal best | SB season best | WL world leading (in a given season)

== Medal table ==
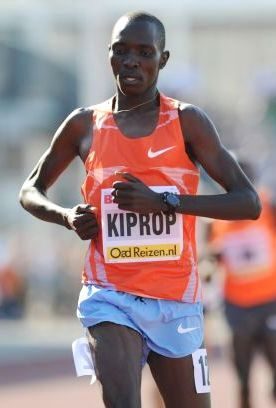
Reigning Olympic champion Asbel Kiprop broke the 1500 m record to win gold for Kenya.

* Host nation (Kenya)

Rank	Nation	Gold	Silver	Bronze	Total
1	Kenya (KEN)*	10	7	8	25
2	Nigeria (NGR)	8	5	5	18
3	South Africa (SAF)	6	7	6	19
4	Egypt (EGY)	4	2	3	9
5	Algeria (ALG)	3	2	3	8
6	Morocco (MAR)	2	1	3	6
7	Botswana (BOT)	2	1	0	3
7	Tunisia (TUN)	2	1	0	3
9	Ethiopia (ETH)	1	4	4	9
10	Senegal (SEN)	1	3	2	6
11	Ivory Coast (CIV)	1	2	1	4
12	Ghana (GHA)	1	1	2	4
13	Uganda (UGA)	1	1	0	2
14	Lesotho (LES)	1	0	1	2
15	Libya (LBA)	1	0	0	1
16	Cameroon (CMR)	0	3	1	4
17	Gabon (GAB)	0	1	1	2
17	Sudan (SUD)	0	1	1	2
19	Burundi (BDI)	0	1	0	1
19	Seychelles (SEY)	0	1	0	1
21	DR Congo (COD)	0	0	1	1
21	Madagascar (MAD)	0	0	1	1
21	Mauritius (MRI)	0	0	1	1
21	Togo (TOG)	0	0	1	1
Totals (24 entries)		44	44	45	133

== Participating nations ==
- Algeria (16)
- Angola (6)
- Benin (5)
- Botswana (14)
- Burkina Faso (12)
- Burundi (8)
- Cameroon (12)
- Comoros (1)
- Ivory Coast (10)
- Democratic Republic of the Congo (11)
- Djibouti (2)
- Egypt (14)
- Equatorial Guinea (2)
- Eritrea (6)
- Ethiopia (63)
- Gabon (2)
- Gambia (3)
- Ghana (14)
- Guinea-Bissau (2)
- Kenya (106)
- Lesotho (2)
- Liberia (5)
- Libya (3)
- Madagascar (6)
- Malawi (1)
- Mali (5)
- Mauritius (15)
- Morocco (19)
- Mozambique (5)
- Namibia (6)
- Nigeria (37)
- Republic of the Congo (7)
- Rwanda (14)
- Senegal (13)
- Seychelles (14)
- Sierra Leone (1)
- Somalia (5)
- South Africa (41)
- Sudan (7)
- Swaziland (1)
- Tanzania (21)
- Togo (4)
- Tunisia (7)
- Uganda (27)
- Zambia (9)
- Zimbabwe (4)
