= Lawretta Ozoh =

Nigerian athlete

Personal information
- Nationality: Nigeria
- Born: 5 September 1990 (age 35)

Sport
- Sport: Athletics
- Event: Sprint
Medal record
Women's athletics
Representing Nigeria
Commonwealth Games
Silver medal – second place	2014 Glasgow	4x100 m relay
African Games
Gold medal – first place	2015 Brazzaville	4x100 m relay
Bronze medal – third place	2015 Brazzaville	200 m
African Championships
Gold medal – first place	2010 Nairobi	4×100 m
Gold medal – first place	2012 Porto-Novo	4×100 m
Gold medal – first place	2014 Marrakesh	4×100 m
Silver medal – second place	2012 Porto-Novo	200 m
- Updated on 26 August 2016

Lawretta Ozoh (born 5 September 1990) is a Nigerian track athlete who specialises in sprinting.

Ozoh was the silver medalist in the 200 metres and was a member of the gold medal-winning Nigerian 4 x 100 metre relay team at the 2012 African Championships in Athletics.

== Doping ban ==
In 2012 Ozoh tested positive for the anabolic steroid Stanozolol and was subsequently handed a two-year ban from sports.
