= Agnes Osazuwa =

Nigerian sprinter

Personal information
- Born: 26 June 1989 (age 37) Benin City, Edo
Medal record
Women's athletics
Representing Nigeria
African Championships
| Gold medal – first place | 2010 Nairobi | 4×100 m |

Agnes Osazuwa (born 26 June 1989 in Benin City, Edo) is a female track and field sprint athlete who competes internationally for Nigeria.

Osazuwa represented Nigeria at the 2008 Summer Olympics in Beijing competing at the 4 × 100 metres relay together with Gloria Kemasuode, Oludamola Osayomi and Ene Franca Idoko she also took part in the 4 × 100 metres relay. In their first round heat they placed fourth behind Belgium, Great Britain and Brazil. Their time of 43.43 seconds was the best non-directly qualifying time and the sixth time overall out of sixteen participating nations. With this result they qualified for the final in which they replaced Osazuwa with Halimat Ismaila. They sprinted to a time of 43.04 seconds, a third place and a bronze medal behind Russia and Belgium. In 2016, the Russian team was disqualified and stripped of their gold medal due to doping violations by one of the Russian runners, Yuliya Chermoshanskaya, thereby promoting Nigeria to the silver medal position.

== Achievements ==
| Year | Competition | Venue | Position | Event | Notes |
Representing Nigeria
| 2008 | World Junior Championships | Bydgoszcz, Poland | 9th (sf) | 100 m | 11.68 (wind: -0.7 m/s) |
| 2008 | World Junior Championships | Bydgoszcz, Poland | 12th (h) | 4 × 100 m relay | 45.30 |
| 2008 | Olympic Games | Beijing, China | 2nd | 4 × 100 m relay | 43.04 s |
