= 2012 African Championships in Athletics =

2012 African Championships
- Championships logo
- Dates: 27 June – 1 July
- Host city: Porto-Novo, Benin
- Venue: Stade Charles de Gaulle
- Events: 44
- Participation: 569 athletes from 47 nations
- Records set: Championship records

The 2012 African Championships in Athletics was held at the Stade Charles de Gaulle in Porto-Novo, Benin from 27 June to 1 July 2012. It was the first time that Benin had hosted the event.

== Medal summary ==
=== Men ===
Chronology: 2008 | 2010 | 2012 | 2014 | 2016

Event	Gold		Silver		Bronze	
100 metres	Simon Magakwe; South Africa	10.29	Amr Ibrahim Mostafa Seoud; Egypt	10.34	Wilfried Koffi Hua; Ivory Coast	10.37
200 metres	Ben Youssef Meïté; Ivory Coast	20.62	Amr Ibrahim Mostafa Seoud; Egypt	20.76	Noah Akwu; Nigeria	20.83
400 metres	Isaac Makwala; Botswana	45.25	Oscar Pistorius; South Africa	45.52	Willem de Beer; South Africa	45.67
800 metres	Taoufik Makhloufi; Algeria	1:43.88	Anthony Chemut; Kenya	1:44.53	André Olivier; South Africa	1:45.09
1500 metres	Caleb Ndiku; Kenya	3:35.71 CR	Ayanleh Souleiman; Djibouti	3:36.34	James Kiplagat Magut; Kenya	3:36.35
5000 metres	Mark Kiptoo; Kenya	13:22.38	Jonathan Kiplimo Maiyo; Kenya	13:22.89	Timothy Kosgei Kiptoo; Kenya	13:24.67
10,000 metres	Kenneth Kipkemoi; Kenya	27:19.74 CR	Mark Kiptoo; Kenya	27:20.77	Lewis Mosoti; Kenya	27:22.54
110 m hurdles	Lehann Fourie; South Africa	13.60	Selim Nurudeen; Nigeria	13.68	Lyès Mokdel; Algeria	13.73
400 m hurdles	Cristian Morton; Nigeria	49.32	Mamadou Kassé Hann; Senegal	49.39	Boniface Tumuti; Kenya	49.45
3000 m steeplechase	Abel Mutai; Kenya	8:16.05	Wilson Kipkemboi Maraba; Kenya	8:16.96	Benjamin Kiplagat; Uganda	8:18.73
4 × 100 m relay	South Africa; Hannes Dreyer; Simon Magakwe; Roscoe Engel; Thuso Mpuang	39.26	Nigeria; Peter Emelieze; Obinna Metu; Adetoyi Durotoye; Ogho-Oghene Egwero	39.34	Ghana; Emmanuel Kubi; Tim Abeyie; Ashhad Agyapong; Allah Laryea-Akrong	39.40
4 × 400 m relay	Nigeria; Saul Weigopwa; Cristian Morton; Abiola Onakoya; Isah Salihu	3:02.39	South Africa; PC Beneke; Ofentse Mogawane; Oscar Pistorius; Willem de Beer	3:04.01	Kenya; Vincent Kiplangat Kosgei; Vincent Mumo Kiilu; Boniface Mucheru; Mark Mutai	3:04.12
20 km walk	Hédi Teraoui; Tunisia		David Kimutai; Kenya		Mohamed Ameur; Algeria	
High jump	Kabelo Kgosiemang; Botswana	2.25	Mohamed Younis Idris; Sudan	2.15	Mathew Sawe; Kenya	2.15
Pole vault	Mouhcine Cheaouri; Morocco	5.10	Samir El Mafhoum; Morocco	5.00	Ruan Van Wyk; South Africa	4.90
Long jump	Ndiss Kaba Badji; Senegal	8.04	Zarck Visser; South Africa	7.98	Ignisious Gaisah; Ghana	7.73
Triple jump	Tosin Oke; Nigeria	16.98	Issam Nima; Algeria	16.69	Hugo Mamba-Schlick; Cameroon	16.34
Shot put	Burger Lambrechts; South Africa	19.51	Orazio Cremona; South Africa	19.19	Yasser Farag Ibrahim; Egypt	18.78
Discus throw	Victor Hogan; South Africa	61.80	Yasser Farag Ibrahim; Egypt	59.61	Russell Tucker; South Africa	57.99
Hammer throw	Chris Harmse; South Africa	77.22	Mohsen Mohamed Anani; Egypt	74.31	Mostafa El Gamel; Egypt	73.81
Javelin throw	Julius Yego; Kenya	76.68	John Ampomah; Ghana	70.65 NR	Kenechukwu Ezeofor; Nigeria	69.58
Decathlon	Ali Kamé; Madagascar	7511	Mourad Souissi; Algeria	7276	Guillaume Thierry; Mauritius	7212

=== Women ===
Chronology: 2008 | 2010 | 2012 | 2014 | 2016

Event	Gold		Silver		Bronze	
100 metres	Ruddy Zang Milama; Gabon	11.16	Blessing Okagbare; Nigeria	11.18	Gloria Asumnu; Nigeria	11.28
200 metres	Gloria Asumnu; Nigeria	22.93	Lawretta Ozoh; Nigeria	22.93	Marie Josée Ta Lou; Ivory Coast	23.44
400 metres	Amantle Montsho; Botswana	49.54 NR, CR	Regina George; Nigeria	51.11	Amy Mbacké Thiam; Senegal	51.68
800 metres	Francine Niyonsaba; Burundi	1:59.11 NR	Eunice Sum; Kenya	1:59.13	Malika Akkaoui; Morocco	1:59.90
1500 metres	Rababe Arafi; Morocco	4:05.80 CR	Mary Kuria; Kenya	4:06.22	Margaret Muriuki; Kenya	4:06.50
5000 metres	Gladys Cherono Kiprono; Kenya	15:40.04 CR	Veronica Nyaruai; Kenya	15:40.65	Gotytom Gebreslase; Ethiopia	15:53.34
10,000 metres	Gladys Cherono Kiprono; Kenya	32:41.40	Priscah Jepleting; Kenya	32:45.73	Betsy Saina; Kenya	32:48.36
100 m hurdles	Gnima Faye; Senegal	13.36	Amina Ferguen; Algeria	13.56	Uhunoma Osazuwa; Nigeria	13.61
400 m hurdles	Muizat Ajoke Odumosu; Nigeria	54.99	Hayat Lambarki; Morocco	55.41	Raasin McIntosh; Liberia	55.99
3000 m steeplechase	Mercy Wanjiku; Kenya	9:43.26	Birtukan Adamu; Ethiopia	9:45.41	Hyvin Jepkemoi; Kenya	9:45.95
4 × 100 m relay	Nigeria; Christy Udoh; Gloria Asumnu; Oludamola Osayomi; Lawretta Ozoh	43.21 CR	Ghana; Rosina Amenebede; Flings Owusu-Agyapong; Beatrice Gyaman; Janet Amponsah	44.35	Ivory Coast; Marie Josée Ta Lou; Amandine Allou Affoue; Mireille Parfaite Gaha; Adeline Gouenon	45.29
4 × 400 m relay	Nigeria; Endurance Abinuwa; Omolara Omotosho; Margaret Etim; Bukola Abogunloko	3:28.77 CR	Botswana; Goitseone Seleka; Lydia Mashila; Oarabile Babolayi; Amantle Montsho	3:31.27 NR	Senegal; Mame Fatou Faye; Amy Mbacké Thiam; Fatou Diabaye; Ndèye Fatou Soumah	3:31.64
20 km walk	Grace Wanjiru; Kenya	1:40:53	Olfa Lafi; Tunisia	1:46:17	Aynalem Eshetu; Ethiopia	1:49:45
High jump	Lissa Labiche; Seychelles	1.86 NR	Anika Smit; South Africa	1.86	Rhizlane Siba; Morocco	1.75
Pole vault	Syrine Balti; Tunisia	3.70	Juanita Stander; South Africa	3.50	Dorra Mahfoudhi; Tunisia; Jeannie Van Dyk; South Africa	3.40
Long jump	Blessing Okagbare; Nigeria	6.96 CR	Janice Josephs; South Africa	6.29	Lynique Prinsloo; South Africa	6.22
Triple jump	Sarah Nambawa; Uganda	13.90	Charlene Potgieter; South Africa	13.90	Jamaa Chnaik; Morocco	13.75 NR
Shot put	Chinwe Okoro; Nigeria	16.21	Omotayo Talabi; Nigeria	15.63	Auriol Dongmo; Cameroon	15.41 NR
Discus throw	Chinwe Okoro; Nigeria	56.60	Elizna Naudé; South Africa	55.88	Suzanne Kragbé; Ivory Coast	54.56
Hammer throw	Amy Sène; Senegal	65.55	Lætitia Bambara; Burkina Faso	65.08	Sarah Bensaad; Tunisia	60.75
Javelin throw	Margaret Simpson; Ghana	54.62	Justine Robbeson; South Africa	52.81	Gerlize de Klerk; South Africa	49.85
Heptathlon	Yasmina Omrani; Algeria	5924	Gabriela Kouassi; Ivory Coast	5481	Bianca Erwee; South Africa	5338

== Medal table ==
Rank	Nation	Gold	Silver	Bronze	Total
1	Nigeria	10	6	4	20
2	Kenya	9	9	9	27
3	South Africa	6	10	8	24
4	Senegal	3	1	2	6
5	Botswana	3	1	0	4
6	Algeria	2	3	2	7
7	Morocco	2	2	3	7
8	Tunisia	2	1	2	5
9	Ghana	1	2	2	5
10	Ivory Coast	1	1	4	6
11	Uganda	1	0	1	2
12	Burundi	1	0	0	1
12	Gabon	1	0	0	1
12	Madagascar	1	0	0	1
12	Seychelles	1	0	0	1
16	Egypt	0	4	2	6
17	Ethiopia	0	1	2	3
18	Burkina Faso	0	1	0	1
18	Djibouti	0	1	0	1
18	Sudan	0	1	0	1
21	Cameroon	0	0	2	2
22	Liberia	0	0	1	1
22	Mauritius	0	0	1	1
Totals (23 entries)		44	44	45	133

== Participating nations ==
A total of fifty countries and 816 athletes have stated their intention to take part in the competition – a record high. There were, however, numerous non-starters with some countries like Tanzania or Eritrea not sending any athletes after all and the actual number of participants was about 569 from 47 countries, numbers comparable to last few editions.

- Algeria (13)
- Angola (1)
- Benin (33)
- Botswana (16)
- Burkina Faso (9)
- Burundi (4)
- Cameroon (19)
- Cape Verde (2)
- Central African Republic (1)
- Chad (6)
- Comoros (1)
- Ivory Coast (13)
- Democratic Republic of the Congo (3)
- Djibouti (6)
- Egypt (12)
- Equatorial Guinea (4)
- Ethiopia (56)
- Gabon (3)
- Gambia (10)
- Ghana (28)
- Guinea-Bissau (1)
- Kenya (43)
- Lesotho (2)
- Liberia (8)
- Libya (15)
- Madagascar (4)
- Mali (10)
- Mauritius (8)
- Morocco (16)
- Mozambique (2)
- Namibia (6)
- Niger (11)
- Nigeria (43)
- Republic of the Congo (8)
- Rwanda (5)
- São Tomé and Príncipe (1)
- Senegal (16)
- Seychelles (10)
- Sierra Leone (2)
- South Africa (69)
- Sudan (4)
- Swaziland (2)
- Togo (12)
- Tunisia (11)
- Uganda (11)
- Zambia (3)
- Zimbabwe (6)
