= 2014 European Athletics Championships – Women's 100 metres =

Women's 100 metres at the 2012 European Athletics Championships
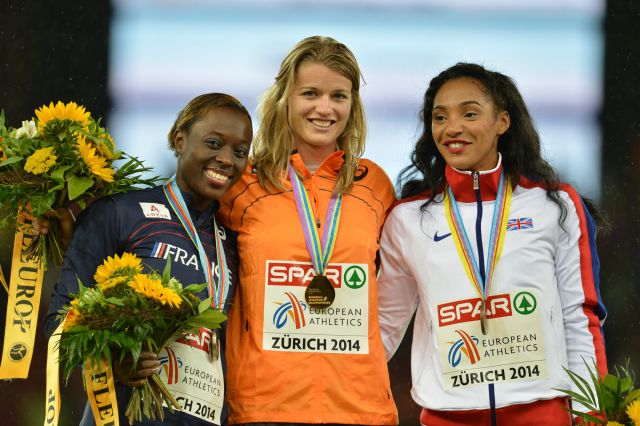
- The podium
- Venue: Letzigrund
- Location: Zürich
- Dates: 12 August (heats); 13 August (semifinals & final)
- Competitors: 37 from 22 nations
- Winning time: 11.12

Medalists
gold medal	Dafne Schippers	Netherlands
silver medal	Myriam Soumaré	France
bronze medal	Ashleigh Nelson	Great Britain

The women's 100 metres at the 2014 European Athletics Championships took place at the Letzigrund on 12 and 13 August. Dutch runner Dafne Schippers won gold in 11.12 seconds.

== Records ==
Standing records prior to the 2014 European Athletics Championships
World record	Florence Griffith Joyner (USA)	10.49	Indianapolis, United States	16 July 1988
European record	Christine Arron (FRA)	10.73	Budapest, Hungary	19 August 1998
Championship record	Christine Arron (FRA)	10.73	Budapest, Hungary	19 August 1998
World Leading	Tori Bowie (USA)	10.80	Fontvieille, Monaco	18 July 2014
European Leading	Dafne Schippers (NED)	11.03	Glasgow, Great Britain	12 July 2014
European Leading	Myriam Soumaré (FRA)	11.03	Fontvieille, Monaco	18 July 2014

== Schedule ==
Date	Time	Round
12 August 2014	11:40	Round 1
13 August 2014	18:20	Semifinals
13 August 2014	20:25	Final

All times are local times (UTC+2)

== Results ==
=== Round 1 ===
First 4 in each heat (Q) and 4 best performers (q) advance to the Semifinals.

Wind:
Heat 1: −0.6 m/s, Heat 2: −0.4 m/s, Heat 3: +0.2 m/s, Heat 4: −0.4 m/s, Heat 5: +0.8 m/s

Rank	Heat	Lane	Name	Nationality	Time	Note
1	4	4	Myriam Soumaré	France	11.03	Q, =EL
2	2	7	Dafne Schippers	Netherlands	11.10	Q
3	5	6	Ivet Lalova	Bulgaria	11.17	Q
4	5	3	Ashleigh Nelson	Great Britain	11.19	Q, PB
5	2	8	Desiree Henry	Great Britain	11.21	Q, PB
6	4	3	Ezinne Okparaebo	Norway	11.24	Q, SB
7	5	4	Céline Distel-Bonnet	France	11.25	Q
7	3	7	Verena Sailer	Germany	11.25	Q
9	3	8	Asha Philip	Great Britain	11.28	Q
10	3	6	Hanna-Maari Latvala	Finland	11.30	Q, PB
11	2	4	Ayodelé Ikuesan	France	11.32	Q
11	1	3	Mujinga Kambundji	Switzerland	11.32	Q, NR
13	5	2	Rebekka Haase	Germany	11.35	Q
14	4	7	Nataliya Pohrebnyak	Ukraine	11.37	Q
15	1	7	Tatjana Pinto	Germany	11.41	Q
16	3	1	Inna Eftimova	Bulgaria	11.42	Q
17	3	3	Olesya Povh	Ukraine	11.43	q, SB
18	4	8	Audrey Alloh	Italy	11.44	Q
19	1	2	Andreea Ograzeanu	Romania	11.45	Q
20	4	5	Yeoryía Koklóni	Greece	11.46	q
20	1	8	Jamile Samuel	Netherlands	11.46	Q
22	5	5	Irene Siragusa	Italy	11.47	q
23	2	5	Lina Grincikaite	Lithuania	11.51	Q
24	2	3	Amy Foster	Ireland	11.51	q
25	4	6	Maja Mihalinec	Slovenia	11.52	PB
26	5	8	Phil Healy	Ireland	11.53	
27	3	5	Ramona Papaioannou	Cyprus	11.64	
28	2	6	Marisa Lavanchy	Switzerland	11.65	
29	5	7	Estela García	Spain	11.72	
30	4	2	Lenka Kršáková	Slovakia	11.74	
31	1	4	Daniella Busk	Sweden	11.76	
32	1	6	Carla Tavares	Portugal	11.78	
33	3	4	Kristina Žumer	Slovenia	11.85	SB
34	2	2	Alexandra Bezeková	Slovakia	11.87	
35	3	2	Estefania Sebastian	Andorra	12.46	
36	1	1	Martina Pretelli	San Marino	12.68	
	1	5	María Gátou	Greece	DNF	

=== Semifinals ===
First 2 in each heat (Q) and 2 best performers (q) advance to the Final.

Wind:
Heat 1: −1.9 m/s, Heat 2: +0.6 m/s, Heat 3: 0.0 m/s

Rank	Heat	Lane	Name	Nationality	Time	Note
1	2	5	Dafne Schippers	Netherlands	11.08	Q
2	3	5	Ivet Lalova	Bulgaria	11.15	Q
3	1	5	Myriam Soumaré	France	11.17	Q
4	3	3	Mujinga Kambundji	Switzerland	11.20	Q, NR
5	2	4	Desiree Henry	Great Britain	11.21	Q, =PB
6	3	8	Ayodelé Ikuesan	France	11.22	q, PB
7	1	4	Ashleigh Nelson	Great Britain	11.23	Q
8	2	6	Céline Distel-Bonnet	France	11.24	q
8	3	6	Asha Philip	Great Britain	11.24	
8	3	4	Verena Sailer	Germany	11.24	
11	2	7	Nataliya Pohrebnyak	Ukraine	11.30	
12	3	1	Olesya Povh	Ukraine	11.42	SB
13	1	8	Andreea Ograzeanu	Romania	11.44	
14	3	7	Audrey Alloh	Italy	11.45	
15	1	6	Ezinne Okparaebo	Norway	11.46	
16	2	3	Tatjana Pinto	Germany	11.48	
17	2	8	Inna Eftimova	Bulgaria	11.49	
18	2	1	Lina Grincikaite	Lithuania	11.52	
18	1	7	Rebekka Haase	Germany	11.52	
20	2	2	Irene Siragusa	Italy	11.53	
21	1	2	Jamile Samuel	Netherlands	11.54	
22	1	3	Hanna-Maari Latvala	Finland	11.57	
23	3	2	Yeoryía Koklóni	Greece	11.69	
24	1	1	Amy Foster	Ireland	11.79	

=== Final ===
Wind: −1.7 m/s

Rank	Lane	Name	Nationality	Time	Note
1st place, gold medalist(s)	5	Dafne Schippers	Netherlands	11.12	
2nd place, silver medalist(s)	3	Myriam Soumaré	France	11.16	
3rd place, bronze medalist(s)	7	Ashleigh Nelson	Great Britain	11.22	
4	4	Mujinga Kambundji	Switzerland	11.30	
5	6	Ivet Lalova	Bulgaria	11.33	
6	2	Céline Distel-Bonnet	France	11.38	
7	8	Desiree Henry	Great Britain	11.43	
8	1	Ayodelé Ikuesan	France	11.54	
