= 2015 European Athletics Indoor Championships – Women's 60 metres =

The women's 60 metres event at the 2015 European Athletics Indoor Championships was held on 7 March 2015 at 10:00 (heats), on 8 March at 14:30 (semifinals) and 16:55 (final) local time.

== Medalists ==
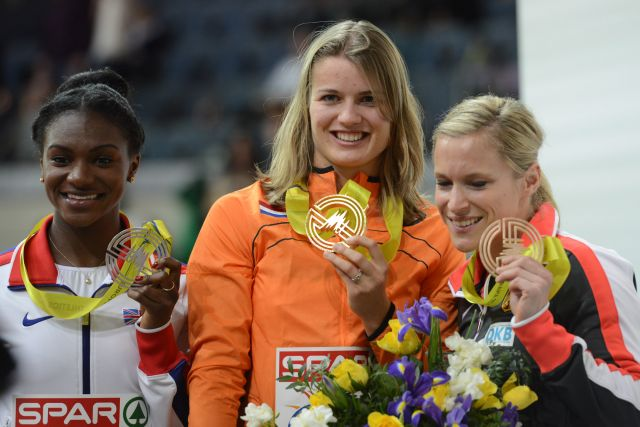
The medalists (left to right): Asher-Smith, Schippers, Sailer

Gold	Silver	Bronze
Dafne Schippers; Netherlands	Dina Asher-Smith; Great Britain	Verena Sailer; Germany

== Results ==
=== Heats ===
Qualification: First 4 of each heat (Q) and the next 4 fastest (q) qualified for the semifinals.

Rank	Heat	Athlete	Nationality	Time	Note
1	3	Dafne Schippers	Netherlands	7.07	Q, PB
2	2	Verena Sailer	Germany	7.10	Q, PB
2	4	Dina Asher-Smith	Great Britain	7.10	Q, PB
4	5	Ezinne Okparaebo	Norway	7.17	Q, SB
5	1	Mujinga Kambundji	Switzerland	7.22	Q
5	5	Olesya Povh	Ukraine	7.22	Q
7	2	Nataliya Pohrebnyak	Ukraine	7.23	Q, PB
7	3	Alexandra Burghardt	Germany	7.23	Q
9	1	Ewa Swoboda	Poland	7.24	Q
9	2	Céline Distel-Bonnet	France	7.24	Q, PB
11	1	Maja Mihalinec	Slovenia	7.26	Q, =PB
11	3	Rachel Johncock	Great Britain	7.26	Q, PB
11	4	Ivet Lalova	Bulgaria	7.26	Q
11	4	Jamile Samuel	Netherlands	7.26	Q
15	3	Irene Ekelund	Sweden	7.27	Q
16	4	Audrey Alloh	Italy	7.31	Q, SB
16	5	Rebekka Haase	Germany	7.31	Q
18	3	Anasztázia Nguyen	Hungary	7.33	q
19	2	Marika Popowicz	Poland	7.34	Q
20	4	Hanna-Maari Latvala	Finland	7.36	q
21	5	Inna Eftimova	Bulgaria	7.37	Q
21	2	Petra Urbánková	Czech Republic	7.37	q
23	5	Tiffany Tshilumba	Luxembourg	7.38	q, NR
24	1	Elin Östlund	Sweden	7.39	Q, PB
25	5	Lina Grinčikaitė	Lithuania	7.41	
26	1	Éva Kaptur	Hungary	7.46	
27	2	Alexandra Bezeková	Slovakia	7.47	
28	3	Lenka Kršáková	Slovakia	7.49	SB
29	2	Olga Lenskiy	Israel	7.51	=PB
30	1	Monika Weigertová	Slovakia	7.52	PB
30	3	Hrafnhild Eir Hermóðsdóttir	Iceland	7.52	
30	4	Maarja Kalev	Estonia	7.52	
33	4	Nimet Karakuş	Turkey	7.60	
34	5	Sibel Agan	Turkey	7.67	
35	2	Rachel Fitz	Malta	7.88	
36	5	Estefania Sebastian	Andorra	7.94	
37	1	Marija Stillo	Albania	8.06	
	1	Georgia Kokloni	Greece	DQ	R162.7

=== Semifinals ===
Qualification: First 2 of each heat (Q) and the next 2 fastest (q) qualified for the final.

Rank	Heat	Athlete	Nationality	Time	Note
1	3	Verena Sailer	Germany	7.08	Q, PB
2	1	Dina Asher-Smith	Great Britain	7.10	Q, =PB
2	2	Dafne Schippers	Netherlands	7.10	Q
4	1	Ezinne Okparaebo	Norway	7.15	Q, SB
4	3	Mujinga Kambundji	Switzerland	7.15	Q, NR
6	2	Olesya Povh	Ukraine	7.16	Q, SB
7	1	Jamile Samuel	Netherlands	7.20	q, PB
8	1	Ewa Swoboda	Poland	7.22	q
9	2	Alexandra Burghardt	Germany	7.24	
9	3	Audrey Alloh	Italy	7.24	PB
11	1	Rebekka Haase	Germany	7.25	
12	2	Rachel Johncock	Great Britain	7.26	=PB
12	3	Céline Distel-Bonnet	France	7.26	
14	3	Ivet Lalova	Bulgaria	7.27	
15	2	Inna Eftimova	Bulgaria	7.28	SB
16	2	Maja Mihalinec	Slovenia	7.29	
17	3	Nataliya Pohrebnyak	Ukraine	7.30	
18	1	Irene Ekelund	Sweden	7.36	
19	1	Hanna-Maari Latvala	Finland	7.37	
19	3	Petra Urbánková	Czech Republic	7.37	
21	2	Marika Popowicz	Poland	7.38	
22	1	Anasztázia Nguyen	Hungary	7.39	
22	2	Tiffany Tshilumba	Luxembourg	7.39	
24	3	Elin Östlund	Sweden	7.42	

=== Final ===
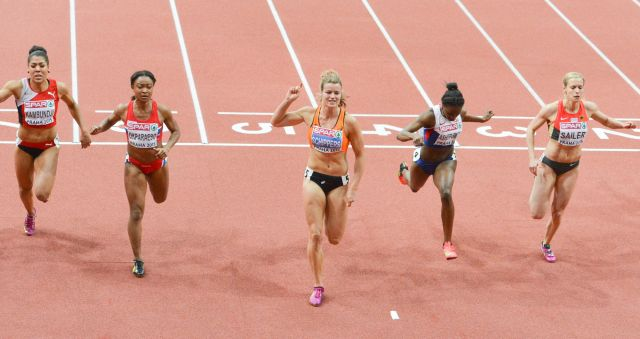
The finish of the final.

Rank	Lane	Athlete	Nationality	Time	Note
1st place, gold medalist(s)	5	Dafne Schippers	Netherlands	7.05	=WL, PB
2nd place, silver medalist(s)	4	Dina Asher-Smith	Great Britain	7.08	=NR
3rd place, bronze medalist(s)	3	Verena Sailer	Germany	7.09	
4	6	Ezinne Okparaebo	Norway	7.10	NR
5	7	Mujinga Kambundji	Switzerland	7.11	NR
6	8	Olesya Povh	Ukraine	7.11	PB
7	1	Jamile Samuel	Netherlands	7.19	PB
8	2	Ewa Swoboda	Poland	7.20	AJR
