= 2013 European Athletics U23 Championships – Women's 200 metres =

The Women's 200 metres event at the 2013 European Athletics U23 Championships was held in Tampere, Finland, at Ratina Stadium on 12 and 13 July.

== Medalists ==
Gold	Jodie Williams; United Kingdom
Silver	Lénora Guion-Firmin; France
Bronze	Gloria Hooper; Italy

== Results ==
=== Final ===
13 July 2013 / 18:40
Wind: -0.5 m/s

Rank	Name	Nationality	Lane	Reaction Time	Time	Notes
1st place, gold medalist(s)	Jodie Williams	United Kingdom	4	0.156	22.92	SB
2nd place, silver medalist(s)	Lénora Guion-Firmin	France	8	0.175	22.96	PB
3rd place, bronze medalist(s)	Gloria Hooper	Italy	5	0.204	23.24	
4	Ashleigh Nelson	United Kingdom	3	0.182	23.25	PB
5	Mujinga Kambundji	Switzerland	1	0.151	23.46	SB
6	Nataliya Strohova	Ukraine	2	0.190	23.51	
7	Jennifer Galais	France	7	0.170	23.56	
	Bianca Williams	United Kingdom	6	0.200	DNF	

=== Heats ===
Qualified: First 2 in each heat (Q) and 2 best performers (q) advance to the Final

==== Summary ====
Rank	Name	Nationality	Time	Notes
1	Jodie Williams	United Kingdom	23.09	Q SB
2	Gloria Hooper	Italy	23.15	Q SB
3	Bianca Williams	United Kingdom	23.24	Q PB
4	Ashleigh Nelson	United Kingdom	23.34	Q PB
5	Lénora Guion-Firmin	France	23.47	Q
6	Mujinga Kambundji	Switzerland	23.49	q =SB
7	Jennifer Galais	France	23.64	Q
8	Nataliya Strohova	Ukraine	23.77	q
9	Barbora Procházková	Czech Republic	23.80	PB
10	Martyna Opoń	Poland	23.83	
11	Hanne Claes	Belgium	23.85	
12	Cynthia Bolingo Mbongo	Belgium	23.96	
13	Fanette Humair	Switzerland	24.01	PB
14	Irene Siragusa	Italy	24.08	SB
15	Jonna Berghem	Finland	24.10	
16	Olga Lenskiy	Israel	24.18	
17	Steffi Creaner	Ireland	24.39	
18	Martina Amidei	Italy	24.46	
19	Liona Rebernik	Slovenia	24.48	
20	Lenka Kršáková	Slovakia	24.51	
	Daniella Busk	Sweden	DNS	

==== Details ====
===== Heat 1 =====
12 July 2013 / 20:30 Wind: -0.9 m/s

Rank	Name	Nationality	Lane	Reaction Time	Time	Notes
1	Jodie Williams	United Kingdom	7	0.167	23.09	Q SB
2	Gloria Hooper	Italy	4	0.183	23.15	Q SB
3	Mujinga Kambundji	Switzerland	2	0.129	23.49	q =SB
4	Cynthia Bolingo Mbongo	Belgium	6	0.172	23.96	
5	Jonna Berghem	Finland	8	0.147	24.10	
6	Steffi Creaner	Ireland	5	0.172	24.39	
	Daniella Busk	Sweden	3		DNS	

===== Heat 2 =====
12 July 2013 / 20:38 Wind: -2.1 m/s

Rank	Name	Nationality	Lane	Reaction Time	Time	Notes
1	Ashleigh Nelson	United Kingdom	8	0.217	23.34	Q PB
2	Jennifer Galais	France	3	0.210	23.64	Q
3	Barbora Procházková	Czech Republic	7	0.176	23.80	PB
4	Hanne Claes	Belgium	2	0.264	23.85	
5	Fanette Humair	Switzerland	6	0.193	24.01	PB
6	Olga Lenskiy	Israel	5	0.307	24.18	
7	Martina Amidei	Italy	4	0.158	24.46	

===== Heat 3 =====
12 July 2013 / 20:46 Wind: -1.4 m/s

Rank	Name	Nationality	Lane	Reaction Time	Time	Notes
1	Bianca Williams	United Kingdom	5	0.188	23.24	Q PB
2	Lénora Guion-Firmin	France	6	0.164	23.47	Q
3	Nataliya Strohova	Ukraine	3	0.182	23.77	q
4	Martyna Opoń	Poland	7	0.155	23.83	
5	Irene Siragusa	Italy	4	0.146	24.08	SB
6	Liona Rebernik	Slovenia	2	0.162	24.48	
7	Lenka Kršáková	Slovakia	8	0.184	24.51	

== Participation ==
According to an unofficial count, 20 athletes from 13 countries participated in the event.

- Belgium (2)
- Czech Republic (1)
- Finland (1)
- France (2)
- Ireland (1)
- Israel (1)
- Italy (3)
- Poland (1)
- Slovakia (1)
- Slovenia (1)
- Switzerland (2)
- Ukraine (1)
- United Kingdom (3)
