= 2013 European Athletics U23 Championships – Women's 100 metres =

The Women's 100 metres event at the 2013 European Athletics U23 Championships was held in Tampere, Finland, at Ratina Stadium on 11 and 12 July.

== Medalists ==
Gold	Dafne Schippers; Netherlands
Silver	Jodie Williams; United Kingdom
Bronze	Tatjana Pinto; Germany

== Results ==
=== Final ===
12 July 2013 / 18:00
Wind: -0.7 m/s

Rank	Name	Nationality	Lane	Reaction Time	Time	Notes
1st place, gold medalist(s)	Dafne Schippers	Netherlands	4	0.166	11.13	
2nd place, silver medalist(s)	Jodie Williams	United Kingdom	3	0.161	11.42	
3rd place, bronze medalist(s)	Tatjana Pinto	Germany	5	0.176	11.50	
4	Mujinga Kambundji	Switzerland	6	0.146	11.55	
5	Rachel Johncock	United Kingdom	1	0.175	11.68	
6	Barbora Procházková	Czech Republic	8	0.161	11.75	
7	Irene Siragusa	Italy	7	0.141	11.78	
8	Daniella Busk	Sweden	2	0.153	11.86	

=== Semifinals ===
Qualified: First 3 in each heat (Q) and 2 best performers (q) advance to the Final

==== Summary ====
Rank	Name	Nationality	Time	Notes
1	Dafne Schippers	Netherlands	11.30	Q
2	Jodie Williams	United Kingdom	11.44	Q
3	Tatjana Pinto	Germany	11.47	Q
4	Mujinga Kambundji	Switzerland	11.69	Q
5	Irene Siragusa	Italy	11.74	Q
6	Barbora Procházková	Czech Republic	11.77	Q
7	Rachel Johncock	United Kingdom	11.79	q
8	Daniella Busk	Sweden	11.81	q
9	Lenka Kršáková	Slovakia	11.85	
10	Leena Günther	Germany	11.89	
11	Olga Lenskiy	Israel	11.92	
12	Martyna Opoń	Poland	11.94	
13	Maria Räsänen	Finland	11.95	
14	Rebekka Haase	Germany	11.98	
15	Catherine McManus	Ireland	11.98	
16	Laura Gamba	Italy	12.08	

==== Details ====
===== Semifinal 1 =====
11 July 2013 / 18:10 Wind: -1.5 m/s

Rank	Name	Nationality	Lane	Reaction Time	Time	Notes
1	Dafne Schippers	Netherlands	4	0.163	11.30	Q
2	Mujinga Kambundji	Switzerland	3	0.101	11.69	Q
3	Barbora Procházková	Czech Republic	1	0.175	11.77	Q
4	Rachel Johncock	United Kingdom	5	0.165	11.79	q
5	Martyna Opoń	Poland	8	0.221	11.94	
6	Rebekka Haase	Germany	7	0.159	11.98	
7	Catherine McManus	Ireland	6	0.157	11.98	
8	Laura Gamba	Italy	2	0.182	12.08	

===== Semifinal 2 =====
11 July 2013 / 18:18 Wind: -0.3 m/s

Rank	Name	Nationality	Lane	Reaction Time	Time	Notes
1	Jodie Williams	United Kingdom	3	0.157	11.44	Q
2	Tatjana Pinto	Germany	4	0.166	11.47	Q
3	Irene Siragusa	Italy	7	0.157	11.74	Q
4	Daniella Busk	Sweden	5	0.199	11.81	q
5	Lenka Kršáková	Slovakia	8	0.167	11.85	
6	Leena Günther	Germany	6	0.159	11.89	
7	Olga Lenskiy	Israel	1	0.157	11.92	
8	Maria Räsänen	Finland	2	0.166	11.95	

=== Heats ===
Qualified: First 3 in each heat (Q) and 4 best performers (q) advance to the Semifinals

==== Summary ====
Rank	Name	Nationality	Time	Notes
1	Dafne Schippers	Netherlands	11.20	Q
2	Jodie Williams	United Kingdom	11.49	Q
3	Mujinga Kambundji	Switzerland	11.56	Q
3	Tatjana Pinto	Germany	11.56	Q
5	Rebekka Haase	Germany	11.69	Q
6	Barbora Procházková	Czech Republic	11.70	q
7	Leena Günther	Germany	11.72	Q
8	Catherine McManus	Ireland	11.74	Q =PB
9	Daniella Busk	Sweden	11.75	Q
9	Irene Siragusa	Italy	11.75	Q
11	Maria Räsänen	Finland	11.76	q
12	Rachel Johncock	United Kingdom	11.78	Q
12	Lenka Kršáková	Slovakia	11.78	Q
14	Laura Gamba	Italy	11.81	q PB
14	Olga Lenskiy	Israel	11.81	q
14	Martyna Opoń	Poland	11.81	Q
14	Petra Urbánková	Czech Republic	11.81	
18	Fanette Humair	Switzerland	11.85	
19	Ana Maria Rosianu	Romania	11.87	
20	Caroline Sandsjoe	Sweden	11.88	SB
21	Jenni Jokinen	Finland	12.01	
22	Alexandra Bezeková	Slovakia	12.02	
22	Diana Suumann	Estonia	12.02	
24	Jamile Samuel	Netherlands	12.08	
25	Freja Jernstig	Sweden	12.14	
	Gloria Hooper	Italy	DNS	

==== Details ====
===== Heat 1 =====
11 July 2013 / 12:00 Wind: -2.7 m/s

Rank	Name	Nationality	Lane	Reaction Time	Time	Notes
1	Tatjana Pinto	Germany	2	0.160	11.56	Q
2	Rachel Johncock	United Kingdom	7	0.178	11.78	Q
3	Martyna Opoń	Poland	8	0.164	11.81	Q
4	Jenni Jokinen	Finland	6	0.172	12.01	
5	Diana Suumann	Estonia	4	0.162	12.02	
6	Jamile Samuel	Netherlands	3	0.168	12.08	
7	Freja Jernstig	Sweden	5	0.190	12.14	

===== Heat 2 =====
11 July 2013 / 12:08 Wind: +1.4 m/s

Rank	Name	Nationality	Lane	Reaction Time	Time	Notes
1	Dafne Schippers	Netherlands	3	0.165	11.20	Q
2	Mujinga Kambundji	Switzerland	4	0.181	11.56	Q
3	Rebekka Haase	Germany	7	0.181	11.69	Q
4	Barbora Procházková	Czech Republic	8	0.170	11.70	q
5	Maria Räsänen	Finland	5	0.176	11.76	q
6	Laura Gamba	Italy	2	0.197	11.81	q PB
7	Caroline Sandsjoe	Sweden	6	0.158	11.88	SB

===== Heat 3 =====
11 July 2013 / 12:16 Wind: -0.2 m/s

Rank	Name	Nationality	Lane	Reaction Time	Time	Notes
1	Jodie Williams	United Kingdom	2	0.193	11.49	Q
2	Leena Günther	Germany	5	0.162	11.72	Q
3	Irene Siragusa	Italy	4	0.170	11.75	Q
4	Petra Urbánková	Czech Republic	6	0.143	11.81	
5	Ana Maria Rosianu	Romania	3	0.154	11.87	
6	Alexandra Bezeková	Slovakia	7	0.185	12.02	

===== Heat 4 =====
11 July 2013 / 12:24 Wind: -0.1 m/s

Rank	Name	Nationality	Lane	Reaction Time	Time	Notes
1	Catherine McManus	Ireland	6	0.154	11.74	Q =PB
2	Daniella Busk	Sweden	4	0.183	11.75	Q
3	Lenka Kršáková	Slovakia	7	0.170	11.78	Q
4	Olga Lenskiy	Israel	3	0.144	11.81	q
5	Fanette Humair	Switzerland	2	0.181	11.85	
	Gloria Hooper	Italy	5		DNS	

== Participation ==
According to an unofficial count, 25 athletes from 14 countries participated in the event.

- Czech Republic (2)
- Estonia (1)
- Finland (2)
- Germany (3)
- Ireland (1)
- Israel (1)
- Italy (2)
- Netherlands (2)
- Poland (1)
- Romania (1)
- Slovakia (2)
- Sweden (3)
- Switzerland (2)
- United Kingdom (2)
