= 2014 European Athletics Championships – Women's 4 × 100 metres relay =

Women's 4 × 100 metres relay at the European Athletics Championships

The women's 4 × 100 metres relay at the 2014 European Athletics Championships took place at the Letzigrund on 16 and 17 August.

== Medalists ==
Gold	Asha Philip, Ashleigh Nelson, Jodie Williams, Desiree Henry; Great Britain
Silver	Céline Distel-Bonnet, Ayodelé Ikuesan, Myriam Soumare, Stella Akakpo; France
Bronze	Marina Panteleyeva, Natalya Rusakova, Yelizaveta Savlinis, Kristina Sivkova; Russia

== Records ==
Standing records prior to the 2014 European Athletics Championships
World record	United States (Tianna Madison, Allyson Felix, Bianca Knight, Carmelita Jeter)	40.82	London, Great Britain	10 August 2012
European record	East Germany (Silke Gladisch, Sabine Rieger, Ingrid Auerswald, Marlies Göhr)	41.37	Canberra, Australia	6 October 1985
Championship record	East Germany (Silke Möller, Katrin Krabbe, Kerstin Behrendt, Sabine Günther)	41.68	Split, Yugoslavia	1 September 1990
World Leading	Jamaica (Kerron Stewart, Veronica Campbell-Brown, Schillonie Calvert, Shelly-Ann Fraser-Pryce)	41.83	Glasgow, Great Britain	2 August 2014
European Leading	Netherlands (Madiea Ghafoor, Dafne Schippers, Tessa van Schagen, Jamile Samuel)	42.40	Lausanne, Switzerland	3 July 2014

== Schedule ==
Date	Time	Round
16 August 2014	15:10	Round 1
17 August 2014	17:22	Final

All times are local times (UTC+2)

== Results ==
=== Round 1 ===
Rank	Heat	Lane	Nation	Athletes	Time	Note
1	1	2	France	Céline Distel-Bonnet, Ayodelé Ikuesan, Myriam Soumaré, Stella Akakpo	42.29	Q, EL
2	2	4	Great Britain	Asha Philip, Ashleigh Nelson, Anyika Onuora, Desiree Henry	42.62	Q, SB
3	1	8	Netherlands	Madiea Ghafoor, Dafne Schippers, Tessa van Schagen, Jamile Samuel	42.77	Q
4	1	3	Switzerland	Mujinga Kambundji, Marisa Lavanchy, Ellen Sprunger, Léa Sprunger	42.98	Q
5	1	1	Italy	Marzia Caravelli, Irene Siragusa, Martina Amidei, Audrey Alloh	43.29	q, SB
6	2	2	Ukraine	Kseniya Karandyuk, Nataliya Strohova, Olesya Povh, Nataliya Pohrebnyak	43.37	Q, SB
7	2	8	Russia	Marina Panteleyeva, Natalya Rusakova, Yekaterina Vukolova, Kristina Sivkova	43.47	Q
8	1	4	Sweden	Iréne Ekelund, Isabelle Eurenius, Daniella Busk, Pernilla Nilsson	43.80	q, SB
9	1	5	Greece	Yeoryia Kokloni, Elisavet Pesiridou, Andriana Ferra, Maria Belibasaki	43.81	SB
10	2	1	Ireland	Amy Foster, Kelly Proper, Sarah Lavin, Phil Healy	43.84	NR
11	1	7	Finland	Milja Thureson, Hanna-Maari Latvala, Minna Laukka, Nooralotta Neziri	44.22	SB
12	2	7	Norway	Isabelle Pedersen, Christine Bjelland Jensen, Elisabeth Slettum, Ezinne Okparaebo	44.29	NR
13	2	3	Bulgaria	Karin Okoliye, Inna Eftimova, Maria Dankova, Ivet Lalova	44.53	SB
14	1	6	Spain	Maria Isabel Pérez, Alba Fernández, Estela García, Cristina Lara	44.68	SB
15	2	5	Croatia	Ivana Lončarek, Nika Župa, Lucija Pokos, Kristina Dudek, Nika Zupa	45.47	
	2	6	Germany	Josefina Elsler, Rebekka Haase, Tatjana Lofamakanda Pinto, Verena Sailer	DNF	

=== Final ===
Rank	Lane	Nation	Athletes	Time	Note
1st place, gold medalist(s)	5	Great Britain	Asha Philip, Ashleigh Nelson, Jodie Williams, Desiree Henry	42.24	EL, NR
2nd place, silver medalist(s)	3	France	Céline Distel-Bonnet, Ayodelé Ikuesan, Myriam Soumaré, Stella Akakpo	42.45	
3rd place, bronze medalist(s)	7	Russia	Marina Panteleyeva, Natalya Rusakova, Yelizaveta Savlinis, Kristina Sivkova	43.22	SB
4	2	Italy	Marzia Caravelli, Irene Siragusa, Martina Amidei, Audrey Alloh	43.26	SB
5	4	Ukraine	Kseniya Karandyuk, Nataliya Strohova, Olesya Povh, Nataliya Pohrebnyak	43.58	
6	1	Sweden	Iréne Ekelund, Isabelle Eurenius, Daniella Busk, Pernilla Nilsson	44.36	
	6	Netherlands	Madiea Ghafoor, Dafne Schippers, Tessa van Schagen, Jamile Samuel	DNF	
	8	Switzerland	Mujinga Kambundji, Marisa Lavanchy, Ellen Sprunger, Léa Sprunger	DNF	
