= 2013 European Athletics U23 Championships – Women's 4 × 100 metres relay =

The Women's 4×100 metres relay event at the 2013 European Athletics U23 Championships was held in Tampere, Finland, at Ratina Stadium on 14 July.

== Medalists ==
Gold	Luise Hollender; Leena Günther; Tatjana Pinto; Katharina Grompe; Germany
Silver	Annie Tagoe; Corinne Humphreys; Rachel Johncock; Jodie Williams; United Kingdom
Bronze	Laura Gamba; Irene Siragusa; Martina Amidei; Gloria Hooper; Italy

== Results ==
=== Final ===
14 July 2013 / 17:05

Rank	Name	Nationality	Lane	Reaction Time	Time	Notes
1st place, gold medalist(s)	Germany	Luise Hollender; Leena Günther; Tatjana Pinto; Katharina Grompe	5	0.167	43.29	CUR
2nd place, silver medalist(s)	United Kingdom	Annie Tagoe; Corinne Humphreys; Rachel Johncock; Jodie Williams	2	0.175	43.83	
3rd place, bronze medalist(s)	Italy	Laura Gamba; Irene Siragusa; Martina Amidei; Gloria Hooper	8	0.213	43.86	NUR
4	Netherlands	Loreanne Kuhurima; Dafne Schippers; Madiea Ghafoor; Jamile Samuel	3	0.159	44.18	
5	Czech Republic	Lucie Domská; Barbora Procházková; Petra Urbánková; Marta Chabrová	7	0.162	44.43	
6	Sweden	Elin Östlund; Hanna Adriansson; Daniella Busk; Caroline Sandsjoe	4	0.157	44.79	
7	Finland	Jenni Jokinen; Maria Räsänen; Jonna Berghem; Emmi Mäkinen	6	0.185	44.86	
	Belgium	Cynthia Bolingo Mbongo; Sarah Rutjens; Imke Vervaet; Hanne Claes	1	0.176	DQ	R 170.7

== Participation ==
According to an unofficial count, 32 athletes from 8 countries participated in the event.

- Belgium (4)
- Czech Republic (4)
- Finland (4)
- Germany (4)
- Italy (4)
- Netherlands (4)
- Sweden (4)
- United Kingdom (4)
