= 2013 European Athletics Indoor Championships – Women's 60 metres =

European Athletes indoor Championship

The women's 60 metres event at the 2013 European Athletics Indoor Championships was held on 2 March 2013 at 13:35 (round 1), 3 March at 16:30 (semi-final) and 3 March at 18:15 (final) local time.

== Records ==
Standing records prior to the 2013 European Athletics Indoor Championships
World record	Irina Privalova (RUS)	6.92	Madrid, Spain	11 February 1993
World record	Irina Privalova (RUS)	6.92	Madrid, Spain	9 February 1995
European record	Irina Privalova (RUS)	6.92	Madrid, Spain	11 February 1993
European record	Irina Privalova (RUS)	6.92	Madrid, Spain	9 February 1995
World Leading	Murielle Ahouré (CIV)	6.99	Birmingham, Great Britain	16 February 2013
European Leading	Mariya Ryemyen (UKR)	7.13	Moscow, Russia	3 February 2013

== Results ==
=== Round 1 ===
Qualification: First 4 (Q) and the 4 fastest athletes (q) advanced to the semifinals.

Rank	Heat	Athlete	Nationality	Time	Note
1	3	Mariya Ryemyen	Ukraine	7.12	Q, =EL
1	1	Verena Sailer	Germany	7.12	Q, =EL
3	2	Ezinne Okparaebo	Norway	7.13	Q, NR
4	1	Dafne Schippers	Netherlands	7.15	Q, PB
5	1	Ivet Lalova	Bulgaria	7.16	Q, SB
6	3	Myriam Soumaré	France	7.16	Q, PB
7	2	Asha Philip	Great Britain	7.19	Q
8	2	Katerina Cechova	Czech Republic	7.25	Q
8	1	Hanna-Maari Latvala	Finland	7.25	Q, PB
10	1	Audrey Alloh	Italy	7.30	q, PB
10	2	Nataliya Pohrebnyak	Ukraine	7.30	Q, PB
12	2	Amy Foster	Ireland	7.33	q
13	3	Jamile Samuel	Netherlands	7.34	Q
14	1	Yuliya Katsura	Russia	7.36	q
15	3	Barbora Procházková	Czech Republic	7.40	q
16	1	Folake Akinyemi	Norway	7.41	SB
16	2	Ilenia Draisci	Italy	7.41	
16	3	Gloria Hooper	Italy	7.41	
16	3	Tatjana Lofamakanda Pinto	Germany	7.41	
20	3	Mujinga Kambundji	Switzerland	7.42	
21	2	Ramona Papaioannou	Cyprus	7.48	
22	1	Aksel Demirtaş-Gürcan	Turkey	7.66	
23	2	Rebecca Camilleri	Malta	7.74	SB
	3	~~Tezdzhan Naimova~~	~~Bulgaria~~	~~7.12~~	~~Q, =EL~~

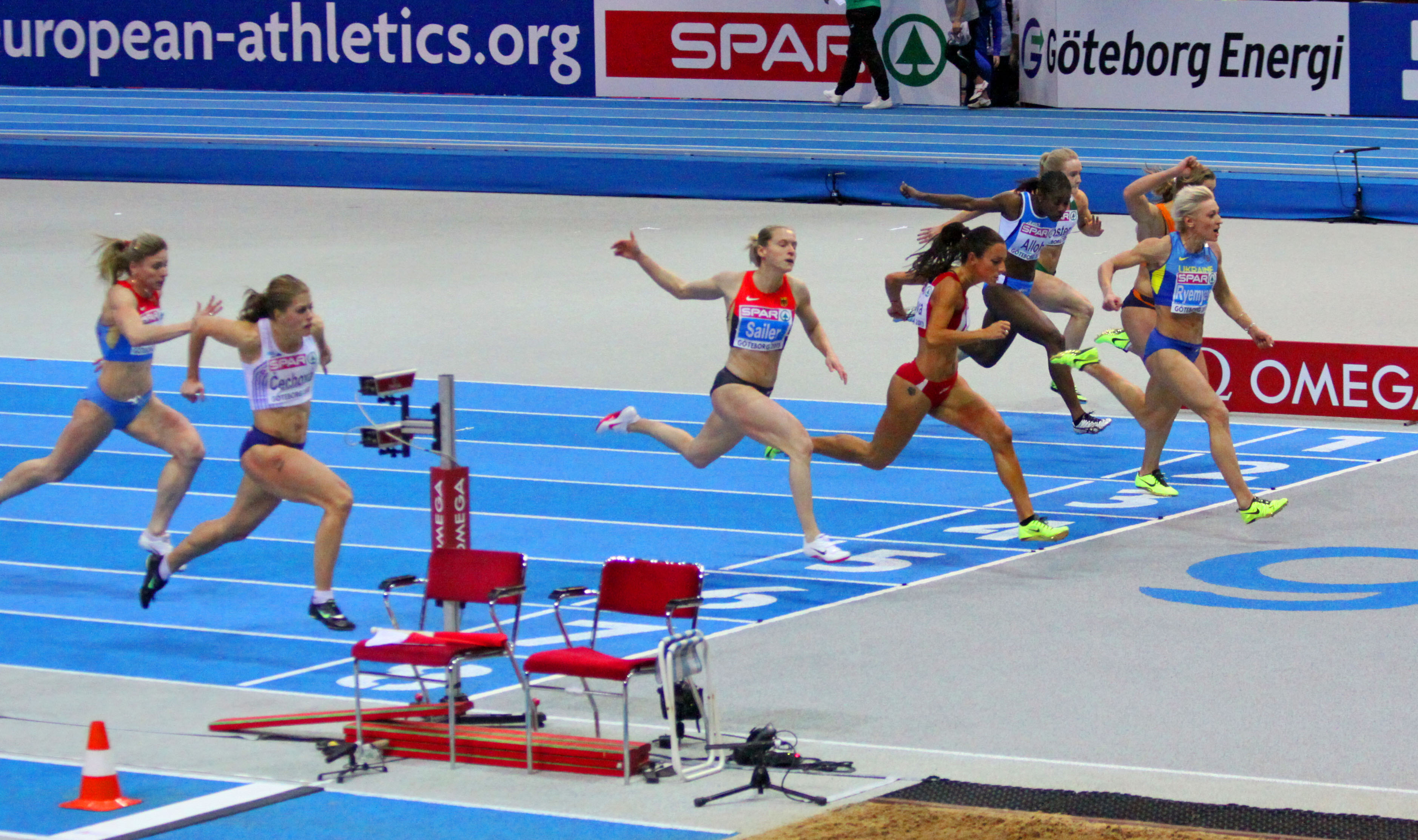
The finish of the first semifinal.

=== Semifinals ===
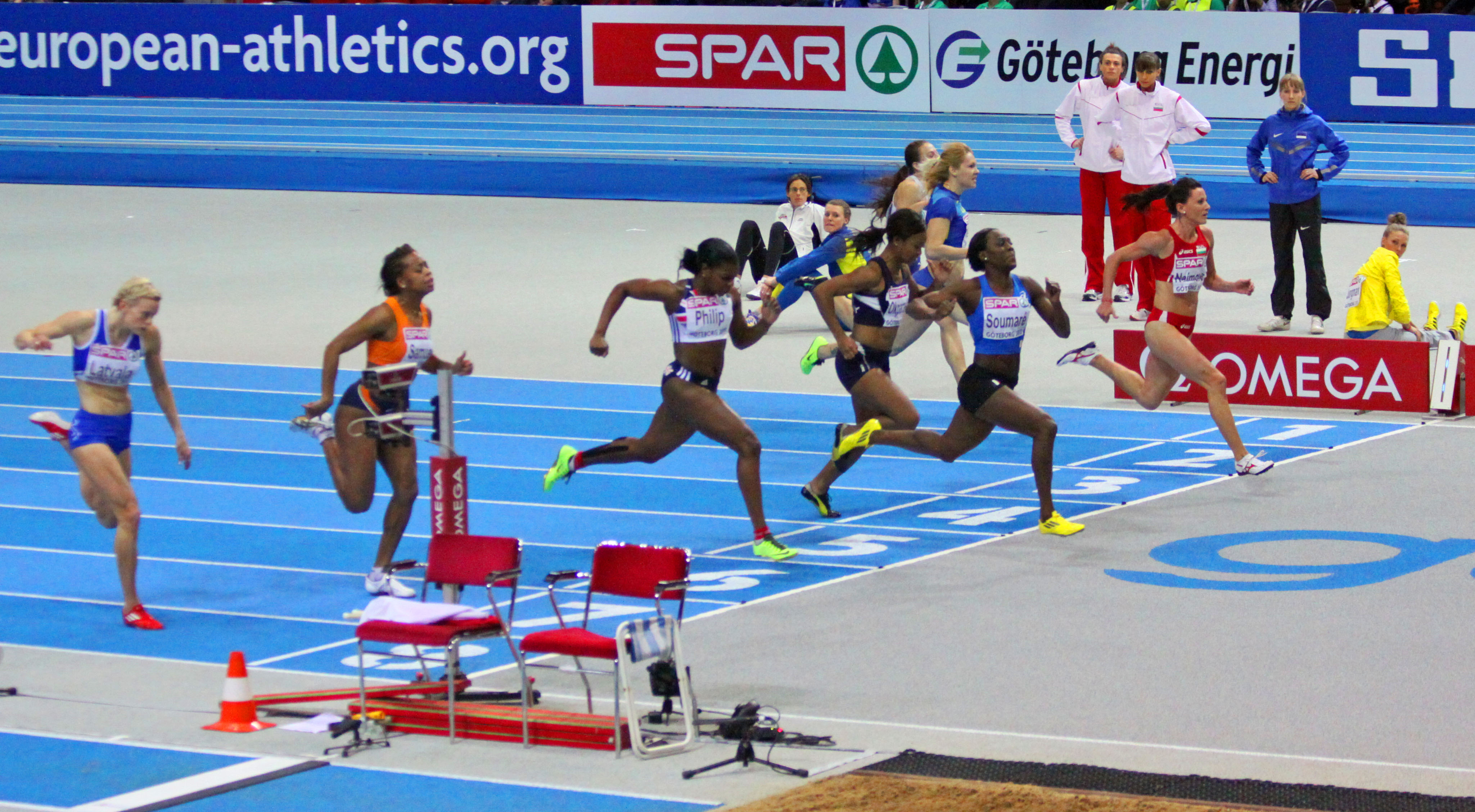
The finish of the second semifinal.

Qualification: First 4 (Q) advanced to the final.

Rank	Heat	Athlete	Nationality	Time	Note
1	2	Myriam Soumaré	France	7.07	Q, EL
2	1	Mariya Ryemyen	Ukraine	7.10	Q, PB
3	1	Ivet Lalova	Bulgaria	7.14	Q, =PB
4	2	Asha Philip	Great Britain	7.17	Q
5	1	Verena Sailer	Germany	7.18	Q
6	1	Dafne Schippers	Netherlands	7.18	Q
7	2	Ezinne Okparaebo	Norway	7.19	Q
8	1	Katerina Cechova	Czech Republic	7.26	
8	2	Jamile Samuel	Netherlands	7.26	PB
10	2	Nataliya Pohrebnyak	Ukraine	7.31	
11	1	Audrey Alloh	Italy	7.33	
12	2	Hanna-Maari Latvala	Finland	7.34	
13	1	Amy Foster	Ireland	7.37	
14	2	Barbora Procházková	Czech Republic	7.42	
15	1	Yuliya Katsura	Russia	7.43	
	2	~~Tezdzhan Naimova~~	~~Bulgaria~~	~~7.11~~	~~Q, PB~~

=== Final ===
The final was held at 18:15. The initial winner of the final, Tezdzhan Naimova, tested positive for the banned steroid drostanolone during the competition. In September 2013, she was officially stripped of her 2013 European Indoor Championships 60m title and banned for life from athletics. Ukraine's Mariya Ryemyen, who came second in the Gothenburg final, was declared the gold medalist of the 60m event, with France's Myriam Soumaré taking the silver medal and Bulgaria's Ivet Lalova the bronze.

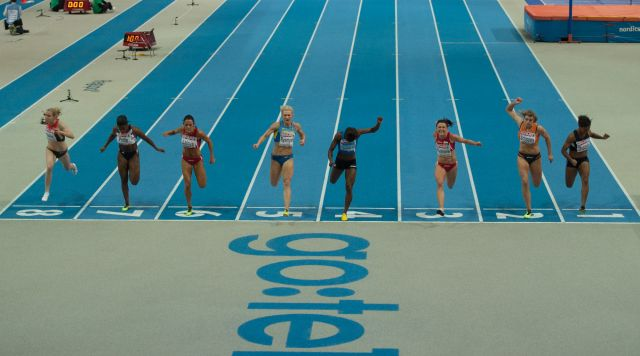
The finish of the final.

Rank	Lane	Athlete	Nationality	Time	Note
1st place, gold medalist(s)	5	Mariya Ryemyen	Ukraine	7.10	=PB
2nd place, silver medalist(s)	4	Myriam Soumaré	France	7.11	
3rd place, bronze medalist(s)	6	Ivet Lalova	Bulgaria	7.12	PB
4	2	Dafne Schippers	Netherlands	7.14	PB
5	7	Asha Philip	Great Britain	7.15	=PB
6	1	Ezinne Okparaebo	Norway	7.16	
7	8	Verena Sailer	Germany	7.16	
DSQ	3	~~Tezdzhan Naimova~~	~~Bulgaria~~	~~7.10~~	~~PB~~
