= Athletics at the 2015 Summer Universiade – Women's 100 metres =

The women's 100 metres event at the 2015 Summer Universiade was held on 8 and 9 July at the Gwangju Universiade Main Stadium.

== Medalists ==
Gold	Silver	Bronze
Viktoriya Zyabkina; Kazakhstan	Shimayra Williams; Jamaica	Yelena Kozlova; Russia

== Results ==
=== Heats ===
Qualification: First 3 in each heat (Q) and next 6 fastest (q) qualified for the semifinals.

Wind:
Heat 1: +0.4 m/s, Heat 2: +0.6 m/s, Heat 3: +0.5 m/s, Heat 4: +0.3 m/s, Heat 5: +0.1 m/s, Heat 6: +0.1 m/s

Rank	Heat	Name	Nationality	Time	Notes
1	4	Viktoriya Zyabkina	Kazakhstan	11.46	Q
2	6	Ashleigh Whittaker	Australia	11.50	Q
3	5	Shimayra Williams	Jamaica	11.59	Q
4	1	Yelena Kozlova	Russia	11.60	Q
4	6	Lina Grinčikaitė-Samuolė	Lithuania	11.60	Q
6	2	Kedisha Dallas	Jamaica	11.63	Q
7	2	Anna Golovina	Russia	11.71	Q
8	3	Udaya Ada	Liberia	11.73	Q
8	6	Leah Walkeden	Canada	11.73	Q
10	4	Beatrice Gyaman	Ghana	11.75	Q, PB
11	2	Kelsey Berryman	New Zealand	11.77	Q, PB
12	4	Andreea Ogrăzeanu	Romania	11.78	Q, SB
13	5	Lenka Kršáková	Slovakia	11.82	Q
14	1	Marissa Kurtimah	Canada	11.84	Q
14	3	Anna Doi	Japan	11.84	Q
14	4	Alexandra Bezeková	Slovakia	11.84	q
17	2	Barbora Procházková	Czech Republic	11.86	q
18	5	Viola Kleiser	Austria	11.90	Q, SB
19	5	Svetlana Ivanchukova	Kazakhstan	11.94	q
20	1	Zaidatul Zulkifli	Malaysia	11.99	Q
21	3	Karolina Deliautaitė	Lithuania	12.04	Q
22	6	Qin Wenzhong	China	12.05	q
23	5	Maarja Kalev	Estonia	12.10	q
24	2	Anne Dolvik	Norway	12.11	q, PB
25	4	Lam On Ki	Hong Kong	12.13	
26	2	Germaine Abessolo Bivina	Cameroon	12.18	
27	3	Priyanka Kalagi	India	12.31	
28	6	Eunice Lam Wing Tung	Hong Kong	12.37	
29	1	Diana Suumann	Estonia	12.38	
29	4	Fatoumata Sacko	Mali	12.38	
31	5	Ontiretse Molapisi	Botswana	12.43	
32	6	Leonah Musikavanhu	Zimbabwe	12.50	PB
33	2	Hiyanthi Piyadigama	Sri Lanka	12.65	
34	6	Mary Unyuthfua	Uganda	12.88	
35	5	Maroua Selmi	Algeria	12.95	
36	3	Aissa Issa Seyni	Niger	13.48	
37	3	Winta Yilma	Ethiopia	13.72	
38	1	María Nzobeya Nzang	Equatorial Guinea	14.42	
39	1	Taslima Akter Moni	Bangladesh	14.54	
40	2	Nice Antony Mathias	Tanzania	15.50	
	4	Stephanie Kalu	Nigeria	DNS	

=== Semifinals ===
Qualification: First 2 in each heat (Q) and the next 2 fastest (q) qualified for the final.

Wind:
Heat 1: +1.3 m/s, Heat 2: +1.6 m/s, Heat 3: +1.8 m/s

Rank	Heat	Name	Nationality	Time	Notes
1	3	Viktoriya Zyabkina	Kazakhstan	11.27	Q
2	2	Shimayra Williams	Jamaica	11.42	Q
3	2	Yelena Kozlova	Russia	11.43	Q, SB
4	3	Lina Grinčikaitė-Samuolė	Lithuania	11.46	Q, SB
5	1	Kedisha Dallas	Jamaica	11.47	Q
6	3	Alexandra Bezeková	Slovakia	11.56	q
7	1	Ashleigh Whittaker	Australia	11.58	Q
8	3	Anna Doi	Japan	11.61	q
9	1	Kelsey Berryman	New Zealand	11.64	PB
9	2	Svetlana Ivanchukova	Kazakhstan	11.64	
11	1	Anna Golovina	Russia	11.65	
12	1	Barbora Procházková	Czech Republic	11.70	
13	1	Marissa Kurtimah	Canada	11.71	
14	2	Lenka Kršáková	Slovakia	11.72	
15	3	Udaya Ada	Liberia	11.73	
16	3	Leah Walkeden	Canada	11.77	
17	3	Andreea Ogrăzeanu	Romania	11.79	
18	2	Beatrice Gyaman	Ghana	11.81	
19	1	Zaidatul Zulkifli	Malaysia	11.86	
20	2	Karolina Deliautaitė	Lithuania	11.99	
21	1	Maarja Kalev	Estonia	12.02	SB
21	2	Qin Wenzhong	China	12.02	
23	3	Anne Dolvik	Norway	12.95	
	2	Viola Kleiser	Austria	DNS	

=== Final ===
Wind: +0.4 m/s

Official Video

Rank	Lane	Name	Nationality	Time	Notes
1st place, gold medalist(s)	4	Viktoriya Zyabkina	Kazakhstan	11.23	
2nd place, silver medalist(s)	5	Shimayra Williams	Jamaica	11.46	
3rd place, bronze medalist(s)	5	Yelena Kozlova	Russia	11.47	
4	8	Lina Grinčikaitė-Samuolė	Lithuania	11.49	
5	3	Kedisha Dallas	Jamaica	11.49	
6	7	Ashleigh Whittaker	Australia	11.64	
7	1	Anna Doi	Japan	11.70	
8	2	Alexandra Bezeková	Slovakia	11.71	
