= 2014 IAAF World Relays – Women's 4 × 200 metres relay =

Women's 4 × 200 metres relay at the 2014 IAAF World Relays
- Venue: Thomas Robinson Stadium
- Dates: 25 May (heats & final)

The women's 4 × 200 metres relay at the 2014 IAAF World Relays was held at the Thomas Robinson Stadium on 25 May.

== Records ==
Prior to the competition, the records were as follows:

| World record | United States Blue (LaTasha Jenkins, LaTasha Colander, Nanceen Perry, Marion Jones) | 1:27.46 | Philadelphia, United States | 29 April 2000 |
| Championship record | New event | | | |
| World Leading | (United States) Texas A&M University | 1:30.21 | Philadelphia, United States | 26 April 2014 |
| African record | South Africa | 1:32.72 | Bloemfontein, South Africa | 9 March 1987 |
| Asian record | No official record | | | |
| North, Central American and Caribbean record | United States Blue (LaTasha Jenkins, LaTasha Colander, Nanceen Perry, Marion Jones) | 1:27.46 | Philadelphia, United States | 29 April 2000 |
| South American record | No official record | | | |
| European record | East Germany (Marlies Göhr, Romy Müller, Bärbel Wöckel, Marita Koch) | 1:28.15 | Jena, East Germany | 9 August 1980 |
| Oceanian record | No official record | | | |

== Schedule ==
| Date | Time | Round |
|---|---|---|
| 25 May 2014 | 17:30 | Heats |
| 25 May 2014 | 19:46 | Final |

All times are local times (UTC-4)

== Results ==
| KEY: | q | Fastest non-qualifiers | Q | Qualified | NR | National record | PB | Personal best | SB | Seasonal best |

| Rank | Lane | Nation | Athletes | Time | Notes | Points |
|---|---|---|---|---|---|---|
| 1st place, gold medalist(s) | 3 | United States | Shalonda Solomon, Tawanna Meadows, Bianca Knight, Kimberlyn Duncan | 1:29.45 | CR | 8 |
| 2nd place, silver medalist(s) | 6 | Great Britain | Desiree Henry, Anyika Onuora, Bianca Williams, Asha Philip | 1:29.61 | NR | 7 |
| 3rd place, bronze medalist(s) | 5 | Jamaica | Simone Facey, Sheri-Ann Brooks, Anneisha McLaughlin, Shelly-Ann Fraser-Pryce | 1:30.04 | NR | 6 |
| 4 | 8 | Bahamas | Sheniqua Ferguson, Anthonique Strachan, Nivea Smith, Cache Armbrister | 1:31.31 | NR | 5 |
| 5 | 7 | Switzerland | Mujinga Kambundji, Léa Sprunger, Joëlle Golay, Fanette Humair | 1:31.75 | NR | 4 |
| 6 | 4 | France | Mathilde Lagui, Céline Distel-Bonnet, Émilie Gaydu, Sarah Goujon | 1:32.23 | SB | 3 |
| 7 | 2 | Nigeria | Dominique Duncan, Francesca Okwara, Patience Okon George, Regina George | 1:33.71 | NR | 2 |
| | 1 | Trinidad and Tobago | Michelle-Lee Ahye, Reyare Thomas, Kai Selvon, Kamaria Durant | DNF | | |
