= 2018 European Athletics Championships – Women's 4 × 400 metres relay =

Women's 4 × 400 metres relay at the 2018 European Athletics Championships
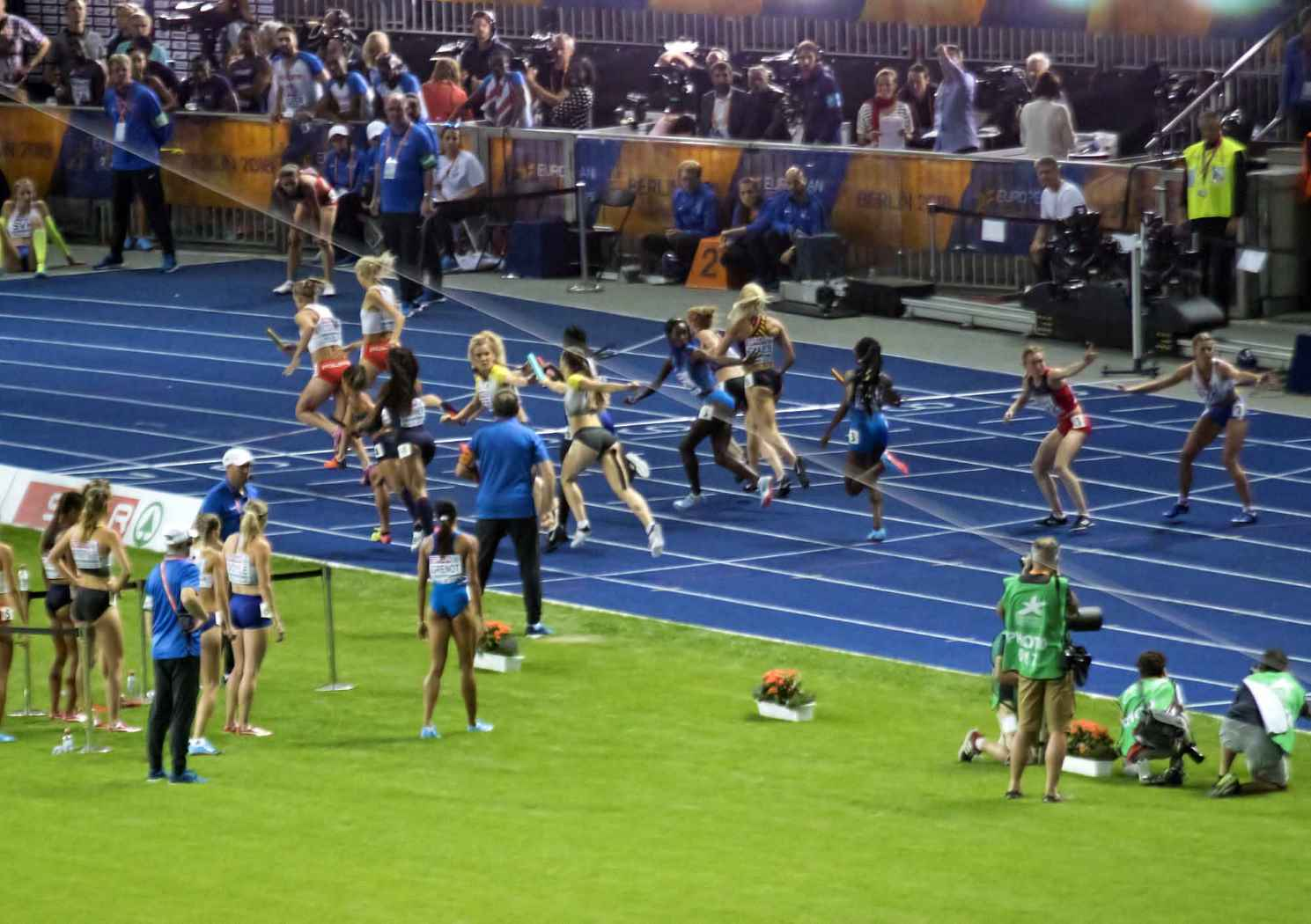
- Venue: Olympic Stadium
- Location: Berlin
- Dates: August 10 (round 1); August 11 (final)
- Competitors: 71 from 16 nations
- Winning time: 3:26.59

Medalists
gold medal	Małgorzata Hołub-Kowalik; Iga Baumgart-Witan; Patrycja Wyciszkiewicz; Justyna Święty-Ersetic; Natalia Kaczmarek*; Martyna Dąbrowska*	Poland
silver medal	Elea-Mariama Diarra; Déborah Sananes; Agnès Raharolahy; Floria Gueï; Estelle Perrossier*	France
bronze medal	Zoey Clark; Anyika Onuora; Amy Allcock; Eilidh Doyle; Finette Agyapong*; Mary Abichi*; Emily Diamond*	Great Britain

The women's 4 × 400 metres relay at the 2018 European Athletics Championships took place at the Olympic Stadium on 10 and 11 August.

== Records ==
Standing records prior to the 2018 European Athletics Championships
World record	Soviet Union; Tatyana Ledovskaya, Olga Nazarova; Mariya Pinigina, Olga Bryzgina	3:15.17	Seoul, South Korea	1 October 1988
European record	Soviet Union; Tatyana Ledovskaya, Olga Nazarova; Mariya Pinigina, Olga Bryzgina	3:15.17	Seoul, South Korea	1 October 1988
Championship record	East Germany; Kirsten Emmelmann, Sabine Busch; Petra Müller, Marita Koch	3:16.87	Stuttgart, West Germany	31 August 1986
World Leading	Jamaica; Christine Day, Anastasia Le-Roy; Janieve Russell, Stephenie Ann McPherson	3:24.00	Gold Coast, Australia	14 April 2018
European Leading	France; Elea-Mariama Diarra, Cinthia Anaís; Déborah Sananes, Floria Gueï	3:25.91	London, Great Britain	14 July 2018

== Schedule ==
Date	Time	Round
10 August 2018	13:40	Round 1
11 August 2018	21:50	Final

== Results ==
=== Round 1 ===
First 3 in each heat (Q) and 2 best performers (q) advance to the Final.

Rank	Heat	Nation	Athletes	Time	Notes
1	1	Italy	Maria Benedicta Chigbolu, Ayomide Folorunso, Raphaela Lukudo, Libania Grenot	3:27.63	Q, SB
2	1	Great Britain	Zoey Clark, Finette Agyapong, Mary Abichi, Emily Diamond	3:28.12	Q
3	2	Poland	Małgorzata Hołub-Kowalik, Patrycja Wyciszkiewicz, Natalia Kaczmarek, Martyna Dąbrowska	3:28.52	Q
4	2	France	Elea-Mariama Diarra, Agnès Raharolahy, Déborah Sananes, Estelle Perrossier	3:28.61	Q
5	2	Belgium	Camille Laus, Cynthia Bolingo, Justien Grillet, Hanne Claes	3:30.62	q
6	1	Germany	Nadine Gonska, Corinna Schwab, Karolina Pahlitzsch, Hannah Mergenthaler	3:31.77	Q, SB
7	2	Romania	Andrea Miklós, Cristina Daniela Balan, Sanda Belgyan, Bianca Răzor	3:31.95	q, SB
8	1	Slovakia	Emma Zapletalová, Iveta Putalová, Daniela Ledecká, Alexandra Bezeková	3:32.11	q, SB
9	2	Sweden	Matilda Hellqvist, Moa Hjelmer, Josefin Magnusson, Lisa Duffy	3:32.61	SB
10	1	Switzerland	Fanette Humair, Robine Schürmann, Rachel Pellaud, Yasmin Giger	3:32.86	
11	1	Spain	Laura Bueno, Herminia Parra, Carmen Sánchez, Aauri Bokesa	3:33.18	
12	1	Portugal	Rivinilda Mentai, Joceline Monteiro, Cátia Azevedo, Dorothé Évora	3:33.35	SB
13	2	Greece	Anna Vasiliou, Despina Mourta, Evaggelía Zigori, Irini Vasiliou	3:34.69	
14	1	Ireland	Sinead Denny, Sophie Becker, Davicia Patterson, Claire Mooney	3:35.96	SB
15	2	Lithuania	Eva Misiūnaitė, Modesta Morauskaitė, Gabija Galvydytė, Erika Krūminaitė	3:37.73	
	2	Ukraine	Kateryna Klymyuk, Mariya Mykolenko, Anastasiia Bryzgina, Tetyana Melnyk	DQ	170.7

=== Final ===
Rank	Lane	Nation	Athletes	Time	Notes
1st place, gold medalist(s)	5	Poland	Małgorzata Hołub-Kowalik, Iga Baumgart-Witan, Patrycja Wyciszkiewicz, Justyna Święty-Ersetic	3:26.59	
2nd place, silver medalist(s)	4	France	Elea-Mariama Diarra, Déborah Sananes, Agnès Raharolahy, Floria Gueï	3:27.17	
3rd place, bronze medalist(s)	6	Great Britain	Zoey Clark, Anyika Onuora, Amy Allcock, Eilidh Doyle	3:27.40	
4	8	Belgium	Cynthia Bolingo, Hanne Claes, Justien Grillet, Camille Laus	3:27.69	NR
5	3	Italy	Maria Benedicta Chigbolu, Ayomide Folorunso, Raphaela Lukudo, Libania Grenot	3:28.62	
6	7	Germany	Nadine Gonska, Laura Müller, Karolina Pahlitzsch, Hannah Mergenthaler	3:30.33	SB
7	1	Romania	Andrea Miklós, Cristina Daniela Balan, Sanda Belgyan, Bianca Răzor	3:32.15	
8	2	Slovakia	Emma Zapletalová, Iveta Putalová, Daniela Ledecká, Alexandra Bezeková	3:32.22	
