= Barbora Procházková =

Czech sprinter

Personal information
- Born: 13 December 1991 (age 34)
- Education: Charles University in Prague

Sport
- Sport: Athletics
- Event(s): 100 m, 200 m
- Club: Univerzitní sportovní klub Praha

Barbora Procházková (born 13 December 1991) is a Czech sprinter. She represented her country at two European Athletics Indoor Championships reaching the semifinals on the first occasion.

== International competitions ==
Year	Competition	Venue	Position	Event	Notes
Representing the Czech Republic
2011	European U23 Championships	Ostrava, Czech Republic	7th	4 × 100 m relay	45.31
2013	European Indoor Championships	Gothenburg, Sweden	14th (sf)	60 m	7.42
2013	European U23 Championships	Tampere, Finland	6th	100 m	11.75
2013	European U23 Championships	Tampere, Finland	9th (h)	200 m	23.80
2013	European U23 Championships	Tampere, Finland	5th	4 × 100 m relay	44.43
2015	Universiade	Gwangju, South Korea	12th (sf)	100 m	11.70
2017	European Indoor Championships	Belgrade, Serbia	30th (h)	60 m	7.51
2017	Universiade	Taipei, Taiwan	9th (sf)	100 m	11.73
2017	Universiade	Taipei, Taiwan	5th	200 m	23.78

== Personal bests ==
Outdoor

- 100 metres – 11.50 (+1.8 m/s, Ustí Nad Orlicí 2016)
- 200 metres – 23.37 (-0.5 m/s, Budapest 2017)

Indoor

- 60 metres – 7.29 (Prague 2017)
- 200 metres – 23.89 (Prague 2013)
