= Amy Foster (athlete) =

Irish sprinter

Amy Foster (born 2 October 1988) is an Irish retired athlete specialising in the sprinting events. She is a two times Summer Universiade finalist, from 2011 and 2013. In addition, she represented Ireland at three European Championships and Northern Ireland at two Commonwealth Games.

In 2018 Foster achieved an Irish indoor record in the 60 metres with a mark of 7.27 seconds. That year, she was described as "the undisputed fastest woman in Ireland".

In May 2019, Foster and her long-time coach David Reid announced her retirement from competition.

== Competition record ==
Year	Competition	Venue	Position	Event	Notes
Representing Ireland and Northern Ireland
2005	European Junior Championships	Kaunas, Lithuania	18th (sf)	200 m	24.73
2005	European Junior Championships	Kaunas, Lithuania	9th (h)	4 × 100 m relay	46.49
2006	World Junior Championships	Beijing, China	16th (sf)	200 m	24.52 (-1.2 m/s)
2007	European Junior Championships	Hengelo, Netherlands	10th (sf)	100 m	11.79
2007	European Junior Championships	Hengelo, Netherlands	10th (sf)	200 m	24.32
2009	European U23 Championships	Kaunas, Lithuania	28th (h)	100 m	12.33
2010	European Championships	Barcelona, Spain	9th (h)	4 × 100 m relay	43.93
2010	Commonwealth Games	Delhi, India	13th (sf)	100 m	11.61
2010	Commonwealth Games	Delhi, India	10th (sf)	200 m	23.83
2011	Universiade	Shenzhen, China	8th (sf)	100 m	11.60
2011	Universiade	Shenzhen, China	7th	200 m	23.58
2012	European Championships	Helsinki, Finland	21st (h)	100 m	11.58
2012	European Championships	Helsinki, Finland	26th (h)	200 m	24.04
2013	European Indoor Championships	Gothenburg, Sweden	13th (sf)	60 m	7.37
2013	Universiade	Kazan, Russia	5th	100 m	11.50
2014	Commonwealth Games	Glasgow, United Kingdom	14th (sf)	100 m	11.44
2014	European Championships	Zürich, Switzerland	24th (sf)	100 m	11.79
2014	European Championships	Zürich, Switzerland	10th (h)	4 × 100 m relay	43.84
2016	European Championships	Amsterdam, Netherlands	17th (sf)	100 m	11.62
2018	World Indoor Championships	Birmingham, United Kingdom	29th (h)	60 m	7.35
2018	Commonwealth Games	Gold Coast, Australia	10th (sf)	100 m	11.54
2018	Commonwealth Games	Gold Coast, Australia	21st (sf)	200 m	24.02

== Personal bests ==
Outdoor

- 100 metres – 11.40 (+1.7 m/s) (Clermont 2014)
- 200 metres – 23.53 (0.0 m/s) (Shenzhen 2011)

Indoor

- 60 metres – 7.27 NR (Abbotstown 2018)
