= Alexandra Bezeková =

Slovak sprinter (born 1992)

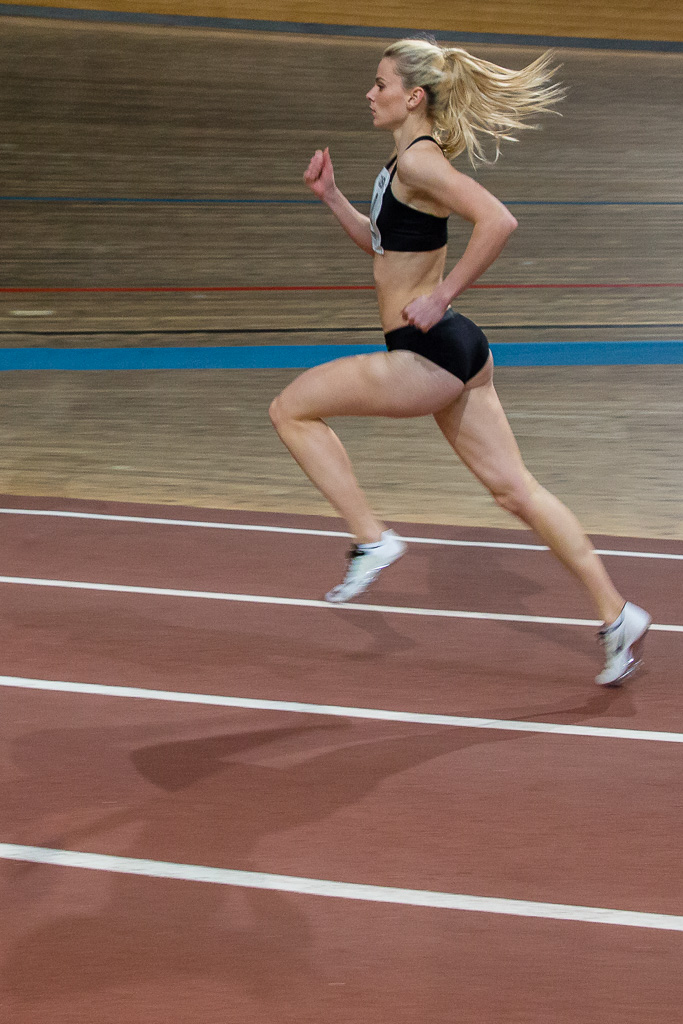

Personal information
- Born: 13 August 1992 (age 34) Košice, Czechoslovakia
- Education: Technical University of Košice

Sport
- Country: Slovakia
- Sport: Athletics
- Events: 100 m, 200 m
Medal record
Women's athletics
Representing Slovakia
European Games
| Gold medal – first place | 2015 Baku | Mixed team |

Alexandra Bezeková (born 13 August 1992) is a former Slovak sprinter. She competed in the 100 metres at the 2016 European Athletics Championships.

== International competitions ==
| Year | Competition | Venue | Position | Event | Notes |
Representing Slovakia
| 2013 | European U23 Championships | Tampere, Finland | 22nd (sf) | 100 m | 12.02 |
| 2014 | European Championships | Zürich, Switzerland | 34th (h) | 100 m | 11.87 |
| 2015 | European Indoor Championships | Prague, Czech Republic | 27th (h) | 60 m | 7.47 |
| 2015 | Universiade | Gwangju, South Korea | 8th | 100 m | 11.71 |
| 2015 | Universiade | Gwangju, South Korea | 10th (sf) | 200 m | 24.09 |
| 2015 | Universiade | Gwangju, South Korea | 5th | 4 × 100 m relay | 46.01 |
| 2016 | European Championships | Amsterdam, Netherlands | 18th (h) | 100 m | 11.71 |
| 2016 | European Championships | Amsterdam, Netherlands | 23rd (h) | 200 m | 23.71 |
| 2016 | European Championships | Amsterdam, Netherlands | 15th (h) | 4 × 100 m relay | 45.31 |
| 2016 | European Championships | Amsterdam, Netherlands | 10th (h) | 4 × 400 m relay | 3:31.66 |
| 2017 | European Indoor Championships | Belgrade, Serbia | 25th (h) | 60 m | 7.49 |
| 2017 | Universiade | Taipei, Taiwan | 7th (sf) | 100 m | 11.60 |
| 2017 | Universiade | Taipei, Taiwan | 4th | 200 m | 23.70 |
| 2018 | World Indoor Championships | Birmingham, United Kingdom | 9th (sf) | 400 m | 53.05 |
| 2018 | European Championships | Berlin, Germany | 20th (h) | 200 m | 23.93 |
| 2018 | European Championships | Berlin, Germany | 20th (h) | 400 m | 52.88 |
| 2018 | European Championships | Berlin, Germany | 8th | 4 × 400 m relay | 3:32.22 |

== Personal bests ==
Outdoor

- 100 metres – 11.87 (-0.4 m/s, Zürich 2014)
- 200 metres – 23.55 (-0.4 m/s, Ostrava 2016)
- 400 metres – 54.65 (Banská Bystrica 2016)

Indoor

- 60 metres – 7.47 (Prague 2015)
- 200 metres – 23.64 (Ostrava 2016)
- 400 metres – 55.81 (Prague 2015)
