= Athletics at the 2017 Summer Universiade – Women's 200 metres =

The women's 200 metres event at the 2017 Summer Universiade was held on 25 and 26 August at the Taipei Municipal Stadium in Taipei, Taiwan.

== Medalists ==
Gold	Silver	Bronze
Irene Siragusa; Italy	Gunta Latiševa-Čudare; Latvia	Anna Bongiorni; Italy

== Results ==
=== Heats ===
Qualification: First 3 in each heat (Q) and next 3 fastest (q) qualified for the semifinals.

Wind:
Heat 1: +2.2 m/s, Heat 2: -1.9 m/s, Heat 3: -3.2 m/s, Heat 4: +0.4 m/s
Heat 5: +2.2 m/s, Heat 6: -2.2 m/s, Heat 7: -1.5 m/s

Rank	Heat	Name	Nationality	Time	Notes
1	5	Gunta Latiševa-Čudare	Latvia	22.93	Q
2	3	Agata Forkasiewicz	Poland	23.68	Q
3	3	Barbora Procházková	Czech Republic	23.75	Q
4	5	Tori Williams	United States	23.78	Q
5	1	Anabel Medina	Dominican Republic	23.79	Q
6	1	Tamzin Thomas	South Africa	23.81	Q
6	3	Olga Safronova	Kazakhstan	23.81	Q
8	6	Phil Healy	Ireland	23.87	Q
9	5	Marcela Pírková	Czech Republic	23.98	Q
10	4	Anna Bongiorni	Italy	24.01	Q
11	3	Viola Kleiser	Austria	24.02	q
12	5	Isidora Jiménez	Chile	24.08	q
13	1	Małgorzata Kołdej	Poland	24.13	Q
13	6	Marileidy Paulino	Dominican Republic	24.13	Q
15	4	Cornelia Halbheer	Switzerland	24.14	Q
16	4	Svetlana Golendova	Kazakhstan	24.22	Q
17	1	Cynthia Bolingo Mbongo	Belgium	24.23	q
18	4	Zoe Hobbs	New Zealand	24.33	
19	6	Anniina Kortetmaa	Finland	24.43	Q
20	4	Nyoka Maxwell	Canada	24.46	
21	1	Scovia Ayikoru	Uganda	24.49	
21	4	Anna Paula Auziņa	Latvia	24.49	SB
23	3	Astrid Glenner-Frandsen	Denmark	24.55	PB
24	2	Irene Siragusa	Italy	24.56	Q
25	3	Noelia Martínez	Argentina	24.60	
26	7	Germaine Abessolo Bivina	Cameroon	24.65	Q
27	4	Sayaka Takeuchi	Japan	24.68	
28	6	Õilme Võro	Estonia	24.74	
29	2	Dania Aguillón	Mexico	24.80	Q
30	2	Alexandra Bezeková	Slovakia	24.84	Q
31	5	Syu Yong-jie	Chinese Taipei	24.94	
32	3	Drita Isljami	Macedonia	25.04	PB
33	2	Mizuki Nakamura	Japan	25.17	
34	2	Leni Shida	Uganda	25.29	
35	6	Katarina Sirmić	Serbia	25.35	
36	1	Ontiretse Molapisi	Botswana	25.50	
37	2	Lucija Pokos	Croatia	25.55	
38	4	Aneja Kodrič	Slovenia	25.80	
39	2	Mathilde Kramer	Denmark	25.81	
40	5	Jeremiah Malonzo	Philippines	26.11	
41	3	Laventa Amutavi	Kenya	26.96	
42	2	Nadeeshani Henry Henderson	Sri Lanka	27.01	
43	6	Karen Janario	Philippines	27.37	
44	1	Nolwazi Vilakati	Swaziland	27.59	
45	5	Aina Suroor Al-Hamimi	Oman	28.60	
46	7	Prestige Ndarata	Central African Republic	28.60	Q
47	7	Happy Mahamudu	Tanzania	29.42	Q
	5	Tsaone Sebele	Botswana	DNF	
	6	Iza Daniela Flores	Mexico	DQ	R162.7
	1	Viktoriya Zyabkina	Kazakhstan	DNS	
	6	Janet Mensah	Ghana	DNS	
	7	Musonda Chitoshi	Zambia	DNS	
	7	Wabalyao Kakwasha	Zambia	DNS	

=== Semifinals ===
Qualification: First 2 in each heat (Q) and the next 2 fastest (q) qualified for the final.

Wind:
Heat 1: -0.7 m/s, Heat 2: -2.9 m/s, Heat 3: +0.5 m/s

Rank	Heat	Name	Nationality	Time	Notes
1	2	Gunta Latiševa-Čudare	Latvia	23.46	Q, PB
2	2	Irene Siragusa	Italy	23.49	Q
3	3	Alexandra Bezeková	Slovakia	23.61	Q
4	1	Olga Safronova	Kazakhstan	23.68	Q
5	3	Anna Bongiorni	Italy	23.69	Q
6	3	Barbora Procházková	Czech Republic	23.72	q
7	3	Tori Williams	United States	23.79	q
8	1	Phil Healy	Ireland	23.80	Q
8	2	Cornelia Halbheer	Switzerland	23.80	
10	1	Tamzin Thomas	South Africa	23.86	
11	3	Marileidy Paulino	Dominican Republic	23.95	
12	1	Agata Forkasiewicz	Poland	24.10	
13	1	Marcela Pírková	Czech Republic	24.11	
14	1	Viola Kleiser	Austria	24.13	
15	3	Isidora Jiménez	Chile	24.31	
16	2	Dania Aguillón	Mexico	24.33	
17	2	Svetlana Golendova	Kazakhstan	24.42	
18	3	Małgorzata Kołdej	Poland	24.43	
19	2	Germaine Abessolo Bivina	Cameroon	24.46	
20	1	Anabel Medina	Dominican Republic	24.47	
21	2	Anniina Kortetmaa	Finland	24.62	
22	2	Cynthia Bolingo Mbongo	Belgium	24.80	
23	3	Prestige Ndarata	Central African Republic	28.61	
24	1	Happy Mahamudu	Tanzania	30.47	

=== Final ===
Wind: -1.4 m/s

Official Video

Rank	Lane	Name	Nationality	Time	Notes
1st place, gold medalist(s)	6	Irene Siragusa	Italy	22.96	PB
2nd place, silver medalist(s)	4	Gunta Latiševa-Čudare	Latvia	23.15	PB
3rd place, bronze medalist(s)	8	Anna Bongiorni	Italy	23.47	
4	3	Alexandra Bezeková	Slovakia	23.70	
5	2	Barbora Procházková	Czech Republic	23.78	
6	5	Olga Safronova	Kazakhstan	23.80	
7	7	Phil Healy	Ireland	23.81	
8	1	Tori Williams	United States	24.03	
