= Cynthia Bolingo =

Belgian sprinter (born 1993)

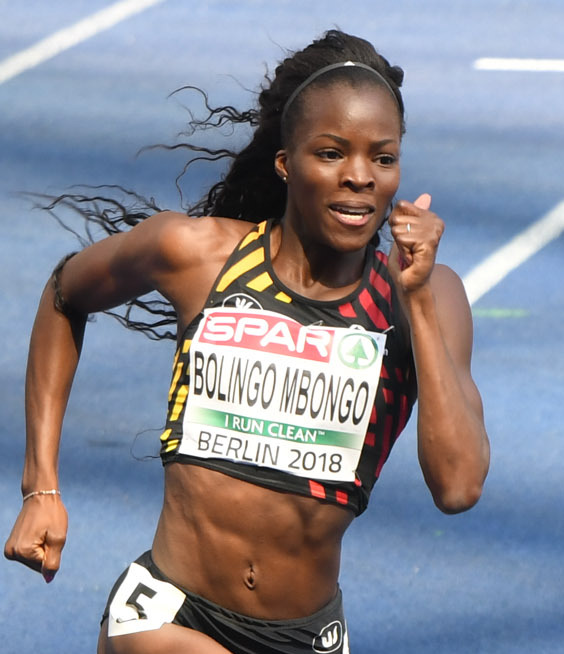
- Bolingo at the 2018 European Championships in Berlin

Personal information
- Full name: Cynthia Maduengele Bolingo Mbongo
- Born: 12 January 1993 (age 33) Uccle, Brussels-Capital Region, Belgium
- Height: 1.65 m (5 ft 5 in)
- Weight: 54 kg (119 lb)

Sport
- Sport: Athletics
- Events: 100 m, 200 m, 400 m
- Club: CABW
- Coached by: Jean Pecher (–2012); Carole Bam (2012–2024); Gary Evans(2024-2026)
- Retired: 27 August 2026
Medal record
Women's athletics
Representing Belgium
European Championships
Bronze medal – third place	2024 Rome	4 × 400 m relay
European Indoor Championships
Silver medal – second place	2019 Glasgow	400 m
European Games
Bronze medal – third place	2023 Kraków-Małopolska	4 × 400 m mixed

Cynthia Maduengele Bolingo Mbongo (born 12 January 1993), known as Cynthia Bolingo, is a now retired Belgian sprinter. In a career beset with injuries, she won the silver medal in the 400 metres at the 2019 European Athletics Indoor Championships and the bronze medal in the 4 × 400 metres at the 2024 European Athletics Championships.

Bolingo competed in the 200 metres at the 2015 World Championships in Beijing without advancing from the first round.

A few weeks after winning that silver medal in the 400 metres at the 2019 European Athletics Indoor Championships in Glasgow, Bolingo felt a pain in her Achilles that got worse and worse and finally forced her to scrap the entire 2019 season. It would be 18 months before she ran in competition again.

On 1 June 2021, she broke the Belgian record on the 400 metres at a meeting in Montreuil, France; with a time of 50 seconds and 75 hundreds, she improved upon the 16-year-old time of 51 seconds 45 hundreds by Kim Gevaert, and qualified to compete at the 2020 Olympics. A month later, she broke it again, lowering it to 50.29 seconds. But then, in the final run-up for the 2020 Summer Olympics in Tokyo, she sustained a hamstring injury in training camp in Mito, Japan, making it impossible for her to run at the Olympics.

On 22 August 2023 she qualified for the 400 m final of the world championships by setting a time of 49 s 96 in the semi-final, improving her Belgian record and becoming the first Belgian to reach the final of a 400 metres at the 2023 World Championships in Budapest.

In June 2024, she was on the Belgian 4 × 400 metres women's relay team that won a bronze medal at the European Athletics Championships. Early July she again sustained an injury during a 400 m race. The injury prevented her from running in both the 4 × 400 m women's and mixed relays at the 2024 Summer Olympics denting Belgian teams's chances for a medal. In the only race she did compete in at the Olympics, the women's 400 metres, an obviously not fit Bolingo finished a disappointing 42nd in the heats.

After two more seasons riddled with injuries, Bolingo announced her retirement from the sport in August 2026.

== International competitions ==
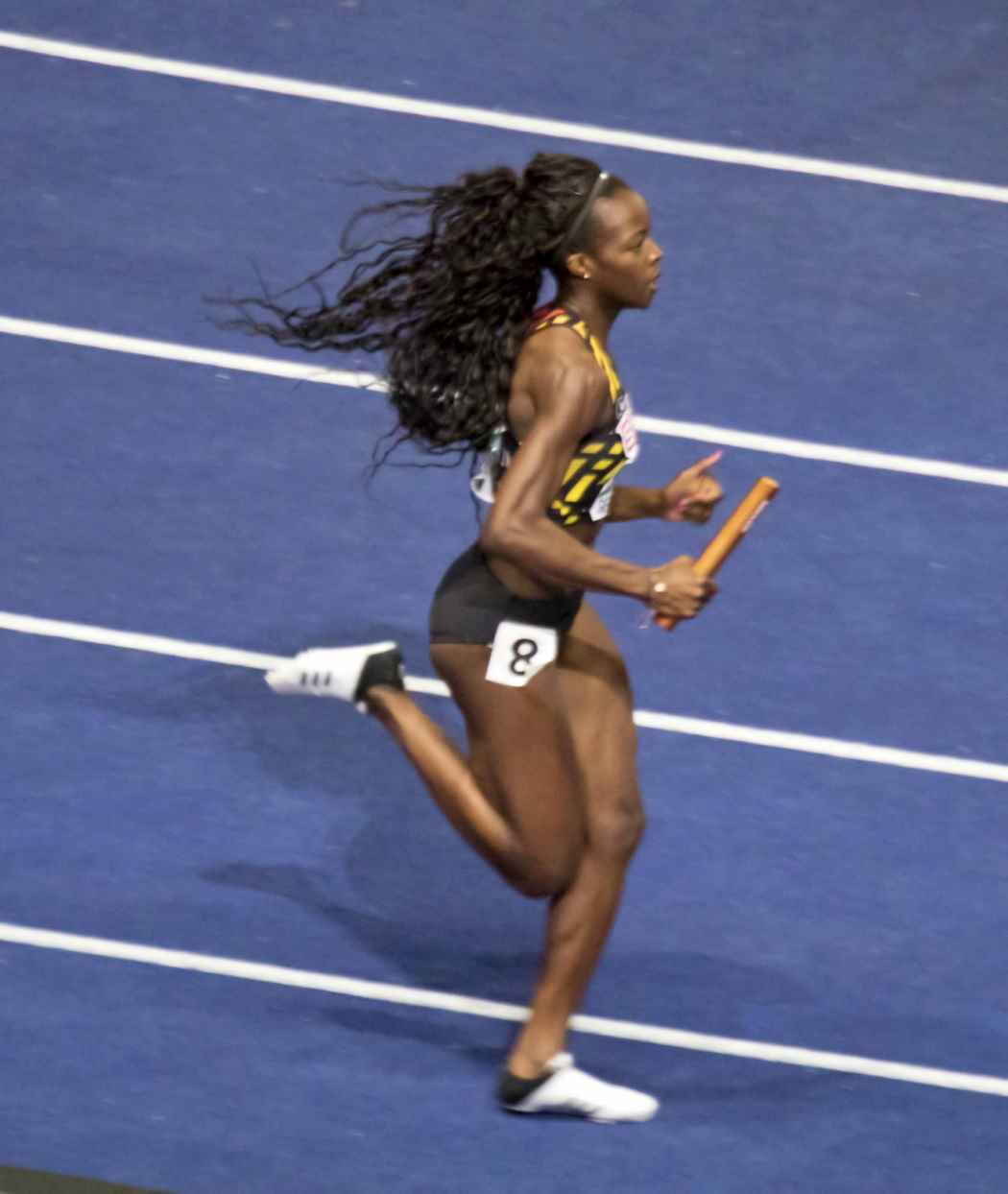
Bolingo runs in the women's 4 × 400 m relay at the 2018 European Athletics Championships

Representing Belgium
Year	Competition	Venue	Position	Event	Notes
2011	European Junior Championships	Tallinn, Estonia	5th	4 × 100 m relay	45.15
2013	European U23 Championships	Tampere, Finland	12th (h)	200 m	23.96
2013	European U23 Championships	Tampere, Finland	–	4 × 100 m relay	DQ
2013	Jeux de la Francophonie	Nice, France	3rd	200 m	24.08
2013	Jeux de la Francophonie	Nice, France	1st	4 × 100 m relay	44.70
2015	European U23 Championships	Tallinn, Estonia	8th	400 m	52.82
2015	World Championships	Beijing, China	43rd (h)	200 m	23.45
2016	Olympic Games	Rio de Janeiro, Brazil	63rd (h)	200 m	23.98
2017	Universiade	Taipei, Taiwan	22nd (h)	200 m	24.80
2018	European Championships	Berlin, Germany	16th (sf)	400 m	51.92
2018	European Championships	Berlin, Germany	4th	4 × 400 m relay	3:27.69
2019	European Indoor Championships	Glasgow, United Kingdom	2nd	400 m	51.62
2019	European Indoor Championships	Glasgow, United Kingdom	5th	4 × 400 m relay	3:32.46
2021	European Indoor Championships	Toruń, Poland	17th (sf)	400 m	53.74
2021	World Relays	Chorzów, Poland	3rd (h)	4 × 400 m relay	3:28.27
2022	European Championships	Munich, Germany	7th	400 m	50.94
2022	European Championships	Munich, Germany	4th	4 × 400 m relay	3:22.12 NR
2023	European Games	Chorzów, Poland	3rd	4 × 400 m mixed	3:12.97
2023	World Championships	Budapest, Hungary	5th	400 m	50.33
2024	World Indoor Championships	Glasgow, United Kingdom	4th	4 × 400 m relay	3:28.05
2024	European Championships	Rome, Italy	3rd	4 × 400 m relay	3:22.95 SB
2024	Olympic Games	Paris, France	42nd (h)	400 m	52.77 SB

== Records ==
Épreuves		Temps	Lieu	Date
60 m	indoor	7 s 25	Belgium Louvain-La-Neuve	2022
100 m	outdoor	11 s 28	Belgium Nivelles	2021
200 m	outdoor	22 s 79	Belgium Nivelles	2021
200 m	indoor	24 s 92	Belgium Ghent	2011
400 m	outdoor	49 s 96 (NR)	Hungary Budapest	2023
400 m	indoor	51 s 62 (NR)	United Kingdom Glasgow	2019
4 × 400 m relay	outdoor	3 min 22 s 12 (NR)	Germany Munich	2022
