= Céline Distel-Bonnet =

French sprinter

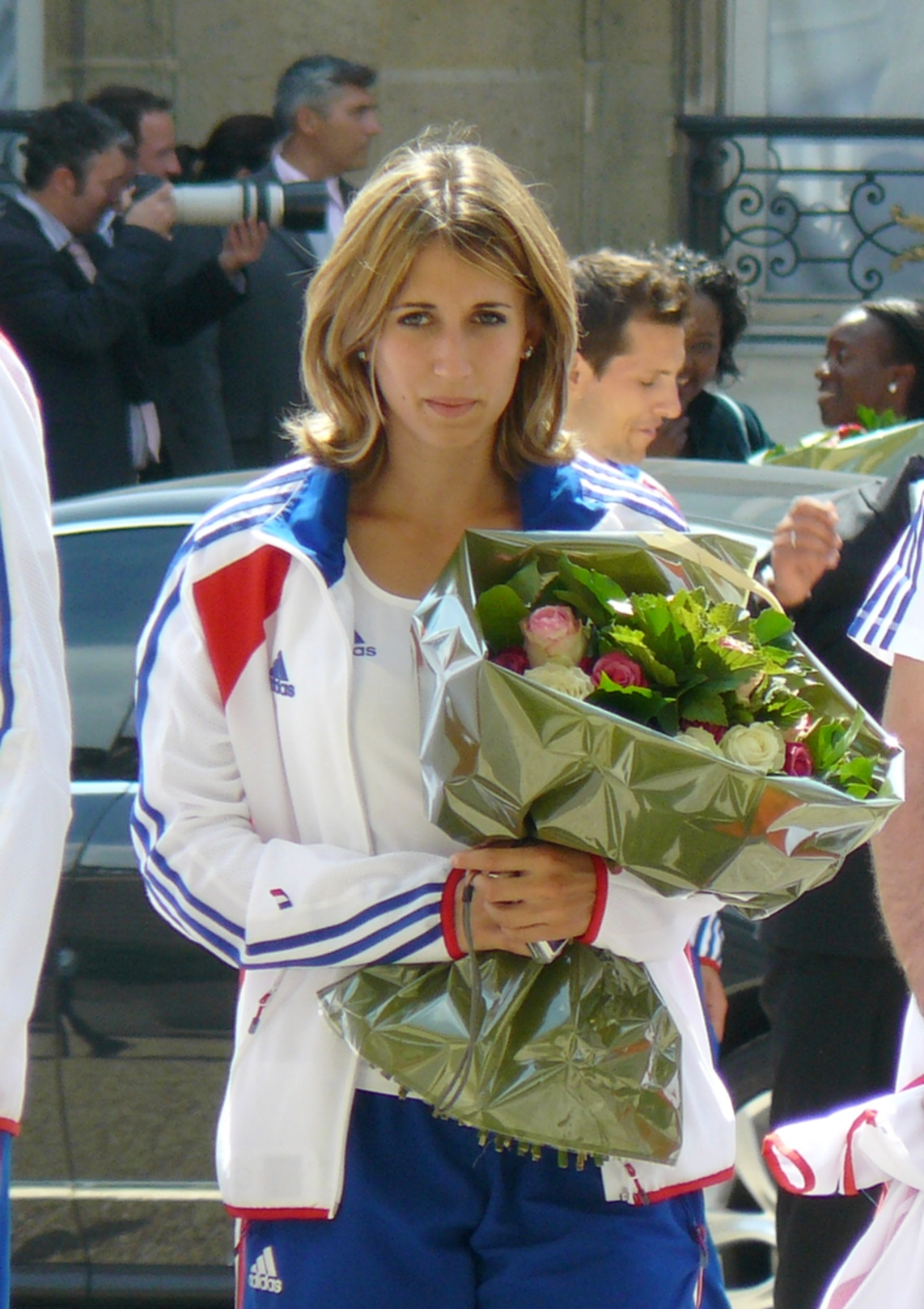
- medalist at Barcelona, 3 August 2010

Personal information
- Born: 25 May 1987 (age 39) Strasbourg, France
- Height: 1.70 m (5 ft 7 in)
- Weight: 59 kg (130 lb)

Sport
- Country: France
- Sport: Athletics (track and field)
- Event: 4 × 100m relay
Medal record
European Championships
Silver medal – second place	2010 Barcelona	4x100 m relay
Silver medal – second place	2014 Zurich	4x100 m relay

Céline Distel-Bonnet (born 25 May 1987) is a French former athlete who competed in the sprinting events.

She finished sixth in the 100 metres at the 2014 European Championships.

In addition, she won several medals as part of the French 4 × 100 metres relay.

She competed for France at the 2016 Summer Olympics.

== Competition record ==
Year	Competition	Venue	Position	Event	Notes
Representing France
2005	European Junior Championships	Kaunas, Lithuania	9th (sf)	100 m	11.93
2005	European Junior Championships	Kaunas, Lithuania	3rd	4 × 100 m relay	44.79
2006	World Junior Championships	Beijing, China	8th	100 m	11.75 (wind: -0.8 m/s)
2006	World Junior Championships	Beijing, China	2nd	4 × 100 m relay	44.20
2009	European U23 Championships	Kaunas, Lithuania	14th (sf)	100 m	11.90
2009	European U23 Championships	Kaunas, Lithuania	4th	4 × 100 m relay	44.26
2010	European Championships	Barcelona, Spain	4th (h)	4 × 100 m relay	43.35
2011	World Championships	Daegu, South Korea	4th	4 × 100 m relay	42.70
2013	World Championships	Moscow, Russia	3rd (h)	4 × 100 m relay	42.25 (Note: Disqualified in the final)
2014	IAAF World Relays	Nassau, Bahamas	8th	4 × 100 m relay	43.76
2014	IAAF World Relays	Nassau, Bahamas	6th	4 × 200 m relay	1:32.23
2014	European Championships	Zürich, Switzerland	6th	100 m	11.38
2014	European Championships	Zürich, Switzerland	2nd	4 × 100 m relay	42.45
2015	European Indoor Championships	Prague, Czech Republic	12th (sf)	60 m	7.26
2015	World Championships	Beijing, China	14th (h)	4 × 100 m relay	43.58
2016	European Championships	Amsterdam, Netherlands	6th	4 × 100 m relay	43.05
2016	Olympic Games	Rio de Janeiro, Brazil	11th (h)	4 × 100 m relay	43.07

== Personal bests ==
Outdoor

- 100 metres – 11.24 (+1.5 m/s) (Reims 2014)
- 200 metres – 23.30 (+1.2 m/s) (Paris 2013)

Indoor

- 60 metres – 7.31 (Aubière 2013)
