= Athletics at the 2017 Summer Universiade – Women's 100 metres =

The women's 100 metres event at the 2017 Summer Universiade was held on 23 and 24 August at the Taipei Municipal Stadium.

== Medalists ==
Gold	Silver	Bronze
Sashalee Forbes; Jamaica	Irene Siragusa; Italy	Salomé Kora; Switzerland

== Results ==
=== Heats ===
Qualification: First 3 in each heat (Q) and next 8 fastest (q) qualified for the quarterfinals.

Wind:
Heat 1: -0.8 m/s, Heat 2: +0.1 m/s, Heat 3: -0.4 m/s, Heat 4: -0.1 m/s
Heat 5: 0.0 m/s, Heat 6: -0.1 m/s, Heat 7: +1.7 m/s, Heat 8: +0.7 m/s

Rank	Heat	Name	Nationality	Time	Notes
1	6	Irene Siragusa	Italy	11.35	Q
2	7	Viktoriya Zyabkina	Kazakhstan	11.40	Q
3	1	Sashalee Forbes	Jamaica	11.41	Q
4	7	Corinne Humphreys	Great Britain	11.48	Q
5	8	Anna Bongiorni	Italy	11.59	Q
6	5	Tamzin Thomas	South Africa	11.63	Q
7	8	Olga Safronova	Kazakhstan	11.65	Q
8	6	Karolina Zagajewska	Poland	11.66	Q
9	2	Sina Mayer	Germany	11.69	Q
9	5	Dutee Chand	India	11.69	Q
11	2	Barbora Procházková	Czech Republic	11.71	Q
11	6	Niamh Whelan	Ireland	11.71	Q
13	6	Zoe Hobbs	New Zealand	11.79	q
14	5	Ajla Del Ponte	Switzerland	11.80	Q
15	4	Alexandra Bezeková	Slovakia	11.81	Q
16	1	Viola Kleiser	Austria	11.82	Q
16	7	Mathilde Kramer	Denmark	11.82	Q
18	4	Kamila Ciba	Poland	11.86	Q
18	7	Anna Paula Auziņa	Latvia	11.86	q, PB
20	3	Salomé Kora	Switzerland	11.90	Q
20	4	Tsaone Sebele	Botswana	11.90	Q
22	2	Hu Chia-chen	Chinese Taipei	11.92	Q
23	1	Iza Daniela Flores	Mexico	11.93	Q
23	8	Lam On Ki	Hong Kong	11.93	Q, SB
25	3	Jellisa Westney	Canada	11.94	Q
26	2	Õilme Võro	Estonia	11.97	q
27	2	Sierra Smith	United States	11.98	q
28	8	Germaine Abessolo Bivina	Cameroon	12.00	q
29	1	Miyu Maeyama	Japan	12.01	q
30	3	Ichiko Iki	Japan	12.02	Q
31	5	Leah Walkeden	Canada	12.04	q
32	3	Zorana Barjaktarović	Serbia	12.10	q
32	7	Ha Thi Thu	Vietnam	12.10	q, PB
34	1	Nikoleta Šimić	Serbia	12.11	
34	6	Estrella de Aza	Dominican Republic	12.11	
36	1	Janet Mensah	Ghana	12.17	PB
37	3	Kiara Rodríguez	Dominican Republic	12.18	
37	5	Astrid Glenner-Frandsen	Denmark	12.18	
39	4	Scovia Ayikoru	Uganda	12.19	
40	6	Diana Suumann	Estonia	12.25	
41	5	Mary Zawadi Unyuthfua	Uganda	12.39	
42	2	Aneja Kodrič	Slovenia	12.40	
43	4	Ingūna Čeiko	Latvia	12.53	
44	7	Ontiretse Molapisi	Botswana	12.56	
45	3	Irene Alisjahbana	Indonesia	12.58	
46	1	Nadeeshani Henry Henderson	Sri Lanka	12.69	
47	6	Jeremiah Angela Malonzo	Philippines	12.76	
48	7	Laventa Amutavi	Kenya	12.88	
49	5	Iveta Urshini	Albania	12.89	
50	2	Kurugamage Jayalath	Sri Lanka	13.26	
51	8	Prestige Ndarata	Central African Republic	13.27	
52	6	Wabalyao Kakwasha	Zambia	13.51	
53	4	Aina Suroor Al-Hamimi	Oman	13.61	
53	8	Nolwazi Knowledge Vilakati	Swaziland	13.61	
55	8	Ramata Sani Hamidou	Niger	14.24	
56	5	Happy Twaha Mahamudu	Tanzania	14.96	
	4	María Akieme	Equatorial Guinea	DNS	
	4	Sandra Konadu Asibuo	Ghana	DNS	
	8	Stephanie Nwann Osuji	Nigeria	DNS	

=== Quarterfinals ===
Qualification: First 3 in each heat (Q) and the next 4 fastest (q) qualified for the semifinals.

Wind:
Heat 1: -0.7 m/s, Heat 2: -0.3 m/s, Heat 3: -0.4 m/s, Heat 4: -0.3 m/s

Rank	Heat	Name	Nationality	Time	Notes
1	4	Irene Siragusa	Italy	11.33	Q
2	2	Sashalee Forbes	Jamaica	11.39	Q
3	4	Salomé Kora	Switzerland	11.47	Q
4	1	Viktoriya Zyabkina	Kazakhstan	11.50	Q
5	4	Corinne Humphreys	Great Britain	11.52	Q
6	1	Ajla Del Ponte	Switzerland	11.59	Q
7	3	Anna Bongiorni	Italy	11.61	Q
8	2	Olga Safronova	Kazakhstan	11.62	Q
8	3	Tamzin Thomas	South Africa	11.62	Q
10	1	Alexandra Bezeková	Slovakia	11.67	Q
11	1	Sina Mayer	Germany	11.70	q
12	4	Niamh Whelan	Ireland	11.74	q
13	3	Barbora Procházková	Czech Republic	11.75	Q
14	2	Viola Kleiser	Austria	11.80	Q
15	4	Zoe Hobbs	New Zealand	11.81	q
16	2	Mathilde Kramer	Denmark	11.82	q
16	2	Karolina Zagajewska	Poland	11.82	q
18	3	Dutee Chand	India	11.90	
18	3	Tsaone Sebele	Botswana	11.90	
20	1	Leah Walkeden	Canada	11.93	
20	2	Miyu Maeyama	Japan	11.93	
22	4	Ichiko Iki	Japan	11.96	
23	3	Hu Chia-chen	Chinese Taipei	11.98	
24	2	Iza Daniela Flores	Mexico	11.99	
25	2	Õilme Võro	Estonia	12.00	
25	4	Jellisa Westney	Canada	12.00	
27	1	Anna Paula Auziņa	Latvia	12.01	
27	1	Lam On Ki	Hong Kong	12.01	
29	1	Kamila Ciba	Poland	12.04	
29	3	Sierra Smith	United States	12.04	
31	3	Germaine Abessolo Bivina	Cameroon	12.11	
32	4	Zorana Barjaktarović	Serbia	12.42	
	4	Ha Thi Thu	Vietnam	DNS	

=== Semifinals ===
Qualification: First 4 in each heat (Q) qualified for the final.

Wind:
Heat 1: 0.0 m/s, Heat 2: -1.9 m/s

Rank	Heat	Name	Nationality	Time	Notes
1	1	Sashalee Forbes	Jamaica	11.22	Q
2	1	Viktoriya Zyabkina	Kazakhstan	11.49	Q
3	1	Anna Bongiorni	Italy	11.55	Q
3	2	Salomé Kora	Switzerland	11.55	Q
5	2	Irene Siragusa	Italy	11.56	Q
6	1	Ajla Del Ponte	Switzerland	11.60	Q
7	1	Alexandra Bezeková	Slovakia	11.60	
8	2	Corinne Humphreys	Great Britain	11.71	Q
9	1	Barbora Procházková	Czech Republic	11.73	
10	2	Olga Safronova	Kazakhstan	11.76	Q
11	2	Tamzin Thomas	South Africa	11.77	
12	1	Niamh Whelan	Ireland	11.81	
13	2	Sina Mayer	Germany	11.84	
14	1	Zoe Hobbs	New Zealand	11.85	
15	2	Karolina Zagajewska	Poland	11.97	
16	2	Viola Kleiser	Austria	12.07	
17	2	Mathilde Kramer	Denmark	12.14	

=== Final ===
Wind: -0.3 m/s

Rank	Lane	Name	Nationality	Time	Notes
1st place, gold medalist(s)	5	Sashalee Forbes	Jamaica	11.18	
2nd place, silver medalist(s)	4	Irene Siragusa	Italy	11.31	PB
3rd place, bronze medalist(s)	7	Salomé Kora	Switzerland	11.33	
4	6	Viktoriya Zyabkina	Kazakhstan	11.49	
4	7	Corinne Humphreys	Great Britain	11.49	
6	8	Anna Bongiorni	Italy	11.50	
7	2	Olga Safronova	Kazakhstan	11.53	
8	3	Ajla Del Ponte	Switzerland	11.62	
