= Hanne Claes =

Belgian athlete (born 1991)

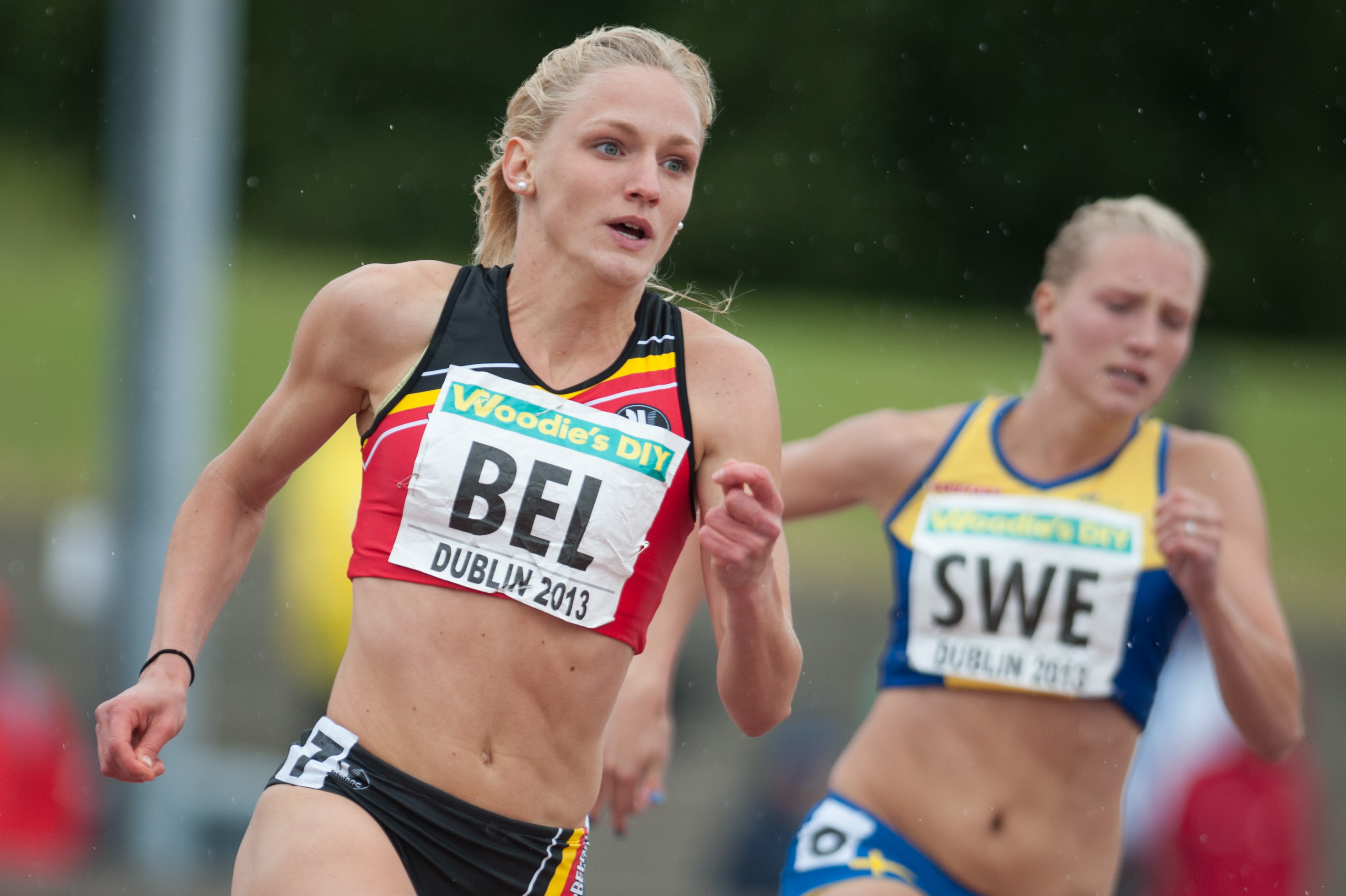
- Hanne Claes in 2013

Personal information
- Born: 4 August 1991 (age 34) Hasselt, Belgium
- Education: KU Leuven

Sport
- Sport: Athletics
- Events: 400 m hurdles, 200 m
- Club: Daring Club Leuven Atletiek
- Coached by: Anke Vanheyste; Wim Van Avondt; Rudi Diels; Jacques Borlée; Carole Bam

Hanne Claes (Dutch: [ˈɦɑnə klaːs]; born 4 August 1991) is a Belgian athlete specialising first in the 200 metres and later 400 metres hurdles.

She competed at the 2020 Summer Olympics and the 2024 Summer Olympics. She ended her career soon after the 2024 Summer Olympics and before a home crowd at the 2024 Memorial Van Damme Diamond League meeting in Brussels, Belgium.

== Career ==
She finished fourth at the 2018 European Championships in the 400 metres hurdles and 4 × 400 metres relay.

== International competitions ==
Year	Competition	Venue	Position	Event	Notes
Representing Belgium
2009	European Junior Championships	Novi Sad, Serbia	5th (h)	100 m hurdles	13.73^{1}
2009	European Junior Championships	Novi Sad, Serbia	4th	4 × 400 m relay	3:41.86
2012	European Championships	Helsinki, Finland	19th (sf)	200 m	23.68
2012	European Championships	Helsinki, Finland	9th (h)	4 × 100 m relay	43.81
2013	European U23 Championships	Tampere, Finland	11th (sf)	200 m	23.85
2013	European U23 Championships	Tampere, Finland	–	4 × 100 m relay	DQ
2014	European Championships	Zürich, Switzerland	23rd (h)	400 m hurdles	60.20
2015	Universiade	Gwangju, South Korea	7th	200 m	23.75
2018	European Championships	Berlin, Germany	4th	400 m hurdles	55.75
2018	European Championships	Berlin, Germany	4th	4 × 400 m relay	3:27.69
2019	European Indoor Championships	Glasgow, United Kingdom	5th	4 × 400 m relay	3:32.46
2019	World Relays	Yokohama, Japan	2nd (B)	4 × 400 m relay	3:31.71
2019	World Championships	Doha, Qatar	12th (sf)	400 m hurdles	55.25
2019	World Championships	Doha, Qatar	5th	4 × 400 m relay	3:27.15
2021	Olympic Games	Tokyo, Japan	28th (h)	400 m hurdles	56.38
2022	World Indoor Championships	Belgrade, Serbia	6th	4 × 400 m relay	3:33.61
2022	European Championships	Munich, Germany	9th (sf)	400 m hurdles	55.31
2022	European Championships	Munich, Germany	4th	4 × 400 m relay	3:22.12
2023	World Championships	Budapest, Hungary	23rd (sf)	400 m hurdles	56.06
2023	World Championships	Budapest, Hungary	5th	4 × 400 m relay	3:22.84
2024	European Championships	Rome, Italy	17th (sf)	400 m hurdles	55.36
2024	Olympic Games	Paris, France	24th (sf)	400 m hurdles	55.96
2024	Olympic Games	Paris, France	7th	4 × 400 m relay	3:22.40

^{1}Did not finish in the final

== Personal bests ==
Outdoor

- 100 metres – 11.49 (+0.9 m/s, Heusden-Zolder 2012)
- 200 metres – 23.26 (+0.7 m/s, Helsinki 2012)
- 400 metres – 51.28 (La Chaux-de-Fonds 2024)
- 400 metres hurdles – 54.33 (La Chaux-de-Fonds 2023)

Indoor

- 200 metres – 23.94 (Ghent 2011)
- 400 metres – 52.78 (Dortmund 2023)
