= Rachel Johncock =

British athlete

Personal information
- Nationality: British (Welsh)
- Born: 4 October 1993 (age 32) Bangor, Wales

Sport
- Sport: Athletics
- Event: Sprints
- Club: Swansea Harriers

Rachel Johncock (born 4 October 1993) is a Welsh track and field athlete specialising in the sprinting events.

== Biography ==
In 2014, Johncock finished in sixth place the 100 metres Great Britain at the 2014 European Athletics Team Championships in Braunschweig.

Later that year Johncock was selected for the Welsh team at the 2014 Commonwealth Games in Glasgow and competed at the 2015 European Indoor Championships.

== Competition record ==
| Year | Competition | Venue | Position | Event | Notes |
Representing Great Britain and Wales
| 2012 | World Junior Championships | Barcelona, Spain | 18th (sf) | 100 m | 11.99 |
| 2012 | World Junior Championships | Barcelona, Spain | 3rd (h) | 4 × 100 m relay | 44.47^{1} |
| 2013 | European U23 Championships | Tampere, Finland | 5th | 100 m | 11.68 |
| 2013 | European U23 Championships | Tampere, Finland | 2nd | 4 × 100 m relay | 43.83 |
| 2014 | Commonwealth Games | Glasgow, United Kingdom | 25th (h) | 100 m | 11.83 |
| 2014 | Commonwealth Games | Glasgow, United Kingdom | 7th | 4 × 100 m relay | 44.51 |
| 2015 | European Indoor Championships | Prague, Czech Republic | 12th (sf) | 60 m | 7.26 |

^{1}Disqualified in the final

== Personal bests ==
Outdoor

- 100 metres – 11.45 (+1.7 m/s) (Cardiff 2014)
- 200 metres – 23.74 (0.0 m/s) (Geneva 2013)

Indoor

- 60 metres – 7.24 (Birmingham 2015)
