= Olga Lenskiy =

Ukrainian-born Israeli sprinter (born 1992)

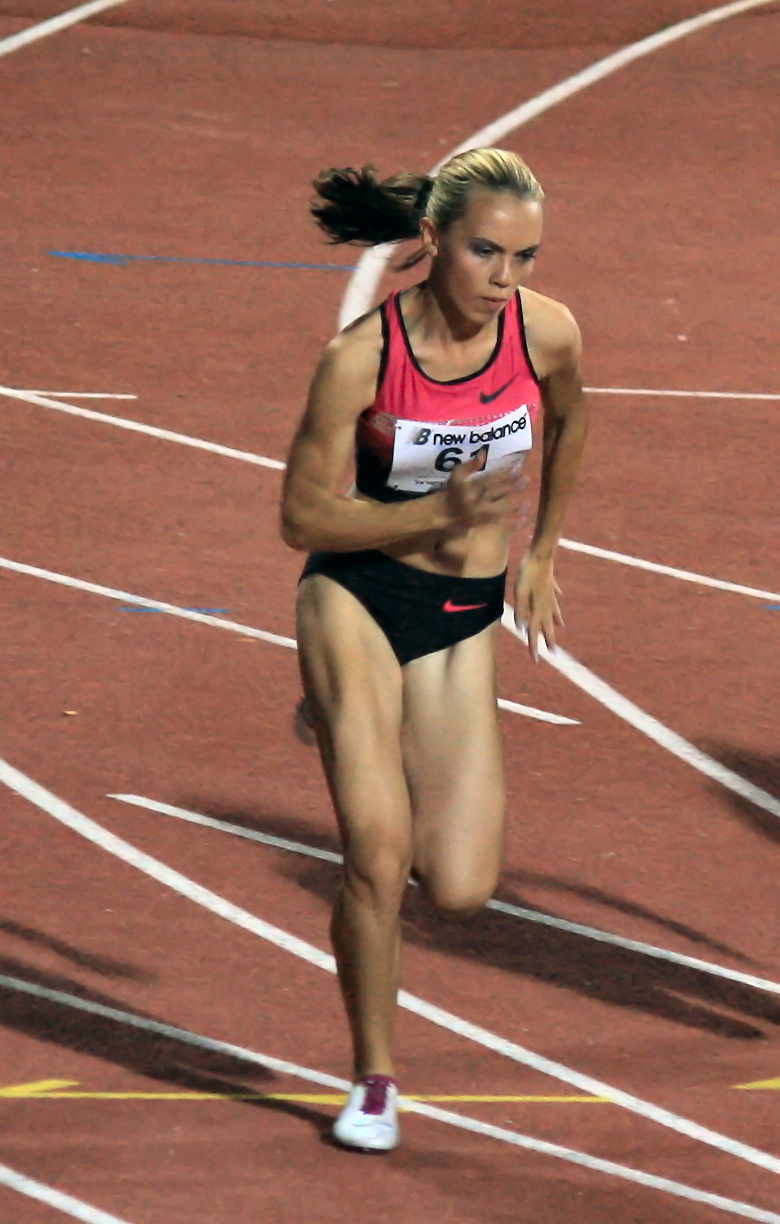

Personal information
- Native name: אולגה לנסקי
- Born: 24 December 1992 (age 33) Ukraine
- Height: 168 cm (5 ft 6 in)
- Weight: 51 kg (112 lb)

Sport
- Sport: Athletics
- Event(s): 100 m, 200 m
Medal record
Representing Israel

Olga Lenskiy (Hebrew: אולגה לנסקי; born 24 December 1992) is a Ukrainian-born Israeli sprinter. She competed in the 200 metres at the 2015 World Championships in Athletics in Beijing without advancing from the first round.

== Personal life ==
Her mother Irina Lenskiy is also a sprinter.

== International competitions ==
| Year | Competition | Venue | Position | Event | Notes |
Representing Israel
| 2009 | World Youth Championships | Brixen, Italy | 54th (h) | 100 m | 12.88 |
| 2009 | World Youth Championships | Brixen, Italy | 47th (h) | 200 m | 26.31 |
| 2011 | European Junior Championships | Tallinn, Estonia | 17th (h) | 100 m | 12.09 |
| 2011 | European Junior Championships | Tallinn, Estonia | 20th (h) | 200 m | 24.75 |
| 2013 | European U23 Championships | Tampere, Finland | 11th (sf) | 100 m | 11.92 |
| 2013 | European U23 Championships | Tampere, Finland | 16th (h) | 200 m | 24.18 |
| 2015 | European Indoor Championships | Prague, Czech Republic | 29th (h) | 60 m | 7.51 |
| 2015 | World Championships | Beijing, China | 46th (h) | 200 m | 23.63 |
| 2016 | European Championships | Amsterdam, Netherlands | 23rd (h) | 200 m | 23.90 |

== Personal bests ==
Outdoor

- 100 metres – 11.42 (+0.5 m/s, Tel Aviv 2014)
- 200 metres – 23.18 (Yerino 2015)

Indoor

- 60 metres – 7.51 (Prague 2015)

== See also ==
- List of Israeli records in athletics
