= Ashleigh Nelson (sprinter) =

English sprinter & bobsledder (born 1991)

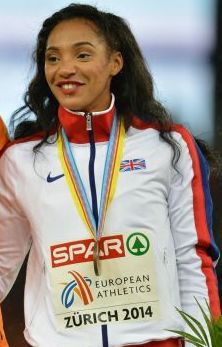
- Nelson in 2014

Personal information
- Nationality: British; English
- Born: 20 February 1991 (age 35) Stoke-on-Trent
- Height: 1.75 m (5 ft 9 in)
- Weight: 68 kg (150 lb)
- Parents: Stephen Nelson, Angela Nelson

Sport
- Country: UK
- Sport: Women's Athletics
- Event: Sprinting
Medal record
Representing Great Britain
World Championships
| Silver medal – second place | 2019 Doha | 4 × 100 m relay |
| Bronze medal – third place | 2013 Moscow | 4 × 100 m relay |
European Championships
| Gold medal – first place | 2014 Zürich | 4 × 100 m relay |
| Bronze medal – third place | 2014 Zürich | 100 m |
World Junior Championships
| Silver medal – second place | 2008 Bydgoszcz | 100 m |
World Youth Championships
| Bronze medal – third place | 2007 Ostrava | 100 m |
Representing England
Commonwealth Games
| Gold medal – first place | 2022 Birmingham | 4 × 100 m relay |
| Bronze medal – third place | 2014 Glasgow | 4 × 100 m relay |

Ashleigh Nelson (born 20 February 1991) is a former English sprinter who now competes as a bobsledder.

== Athletics ==
Ashleigh was the first Brit to win a medal in 40 years taking away a bronze medal in the 100 metres and a gold medal in the 4 × 100 m relay at the 2014 European Championships. In the 4 × 100 metres relay, she also won a bronze medal at the 2013 World Championships and a silver medal at the 2019 World Championships. Her personal bests are 11.19 secs (2014) in the 100 m and 22.85 secs (2019) in the 200 m.

Representing England, she was a gold medalist in the 2022 Commonwealth Games in Birmingham as part of the 4 × 100 metres relay squad.

== Bobsleigh ==
After missing out on the 2024 Summer Olympics in Paris, Nelson made the decision to switch to bobsleigh. She was approached on social media by Adele Nicoll about taking up bobsleigh, with a view to competing at the 2026 Winter Olympics. Nelson competed alongside Nicoll in the 2-women event at the 2025 IBSF World Championships; it was her third ever bobsleigh event.

Nelson was selected for the 2-women event at the 2026 Winter Olympics alongside Adele Nicoll.

== Personal ==
Nelson was born in Stoke-on-Trent and is a cousin of both reality television contestant Wes Nelson and footballer Curtis Nelson. She is mixed-race, of Jamaican descent through her paternal grandparents. Her older brother Alexander was also a sprinter at international level. Both of them were selected to represent Great Britain at the 2008 Beijing Olympics.

Ashleigh is an advocate for mental health awareness and is an ambassador for the charity Sane.
