= Ayodelé Ikuesan =

French sprinter (born 1985)

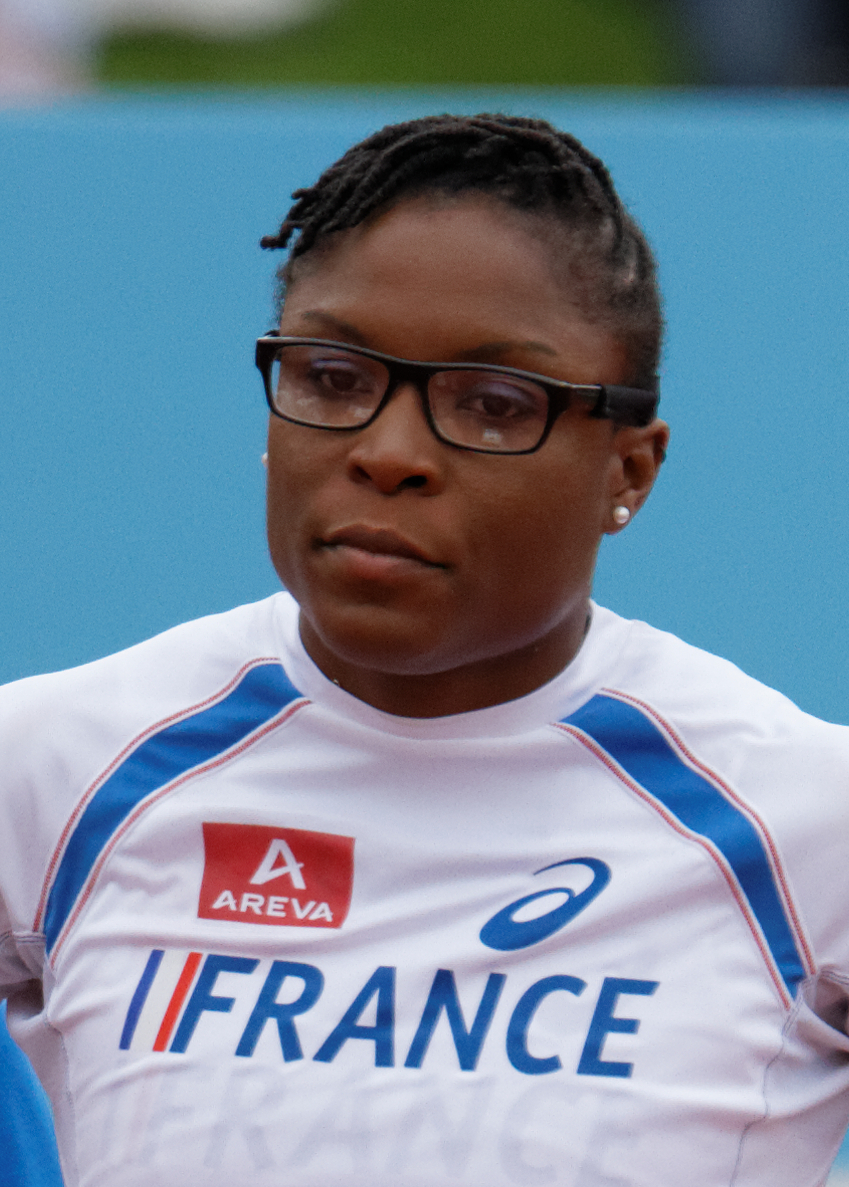

Medal record

Women's athletics

Representing France

European Championships
Silver medal – second place	2014 Zürich	4 × 100 m

Ayodelé Ikuesan (born 15 May 1985) is a French sprinter who specialises in the 60 metres and 4 × 100 metres relay. Ikuesan won the 4 × 100 m relay gold medal at the 2009 Mediterranean Games. She competed in the 60m at the 2009 European Athletics Indoor Championships, the 4 × 100 m relay at the 2011 and 2013 World Championships, the 4 × 100 m relay at the 2008 and 2012 Olympic Games.

== Personal life ==
Ikuesan was born in Paris, to Nigerian parents.
