= Marissa Kurtimah =

Sierra Leone-Canadian athletics competitor (born 1994)

Personal information
- Born: May 25, 1994 (age 32) Songo, Sierra Leone

Sport
- Country: Canada
- Sport: Athletics
- Event: Sprints

Achievements and titles
- Personal best: 100m: 11.34

Marissa Kurtimah (born May 25, 1994 in Songo, Sierra Leone) is a Sierra Leone-Canadian track and field athlete competing in the sprint events, predominantly the 100m event. Kurtimah fled her country of birth (due to the civil war) in 2002 at 8 years old along with her family. They settled in Guelph, Ontario where she competed in high school for Guelph CVI, winning two 100m titles. She was encouraged to try out for the sport by a teacher who saw Olympic potential in her.

After high school, Kurtimah competed at the University of Guelph where she won the 60m at the Canadian Interuniversity Sports championships. In 2014, she transferred to Missouri State University, where in her sophomore year she won All-Missouri Valley Conference honors in the 60m and 200m during the indoor season and the 100m, 200m, and 4×100 relay during the outdoor season. Kurtimah was officially named to Canada's Olympic team as part of the 4×100 meters relay team in July 2016, though she did not ultimately compete at the 2016 Olympics.
