= Daniella Busk =

Swedish sprinter (born 1993)

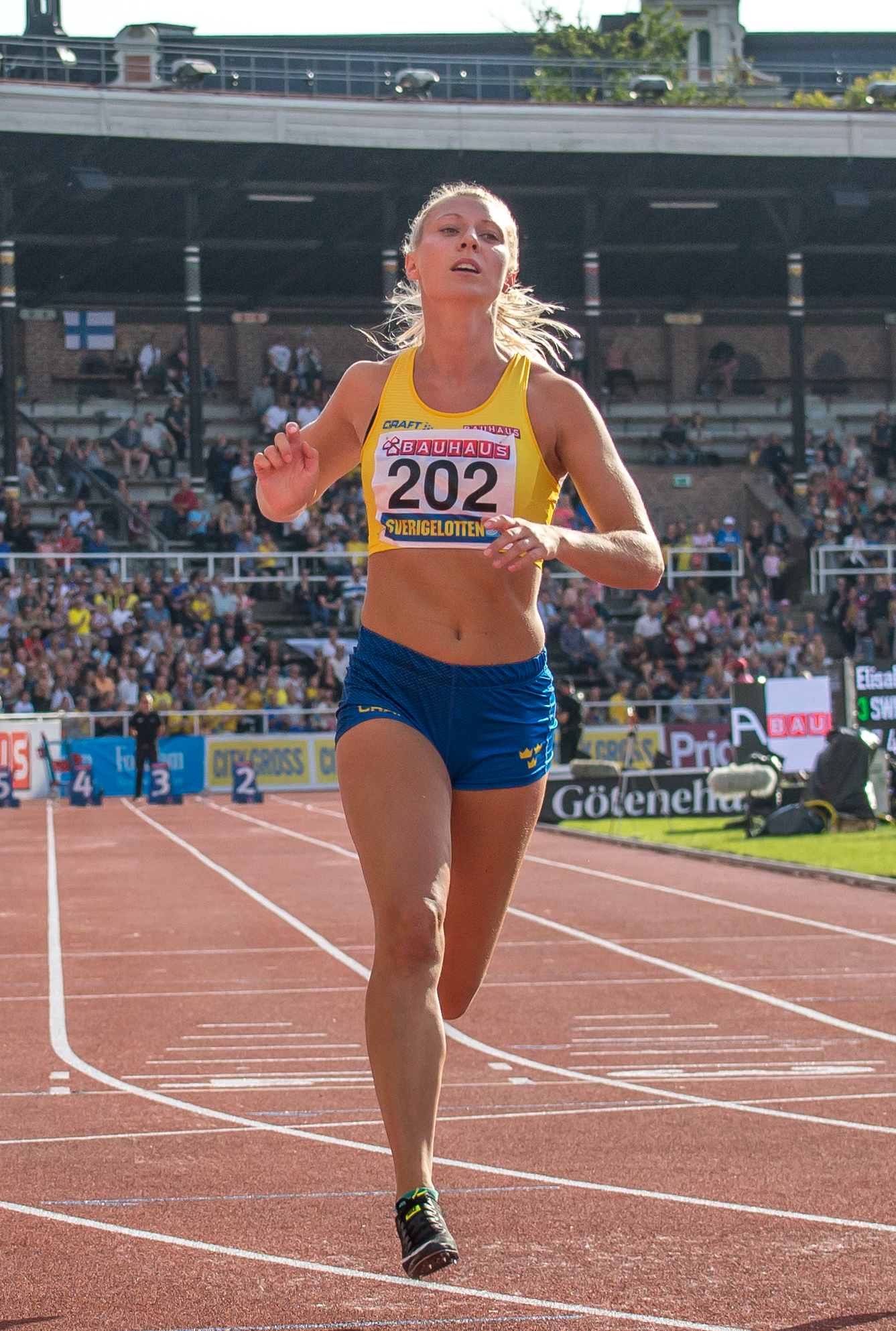
Photo of Daniella Busk

Daniella Busk (born 11 August 1993) is a Swedish sprinter.

In the 100 metres, she finished eighth at the 2013 European U23 Championships. She also competed at the 2014 European Championships and the 2015 European U23 Championships without reaching the final. In the 200 metres, she finished eighth at the 2015 European U23 Championships.

In the 4 × 100 metres relay she finished sixth at the 2013 European U23 Championships, sixth at the 2014 European Championships and seventh at the 2015 European U23 Championships. She also competed at the 2015 IAAF World Relays.

Domestically, she became national 100 and 200 metres champion in 2015. She represents the club Malmö AI.

Her personal best times are 7.54 seconds in the 60 metres (indoor), achieved in February 2014 in Sätra; 11.58 seconds in the 100 metres, achieved in June 2014 in Geneva; and 23.61 seconds in the 200 metres, achieved at the 2015 European U23 Championships in Tallinn.
