= Bianca Knight =

American track and field athlete

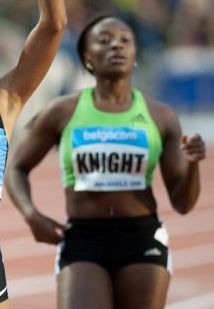

Personal information
- Nationality: American
- Born: January 2, 1989 (age 37) Pearl, Mississippi, U.S.
- Height: 5 ft 3 in (160 cm)
- Weight: 134 lb (61 kg)

Sport
- Sport: Running
- Events: 100 meters, 200 meters
- College team: University of Texas
- Club: Adidas
Medal record
Women's athletics
Representing the United States
Olympic Games
Gold medal – first place	2012 London	4 × 100 m relay
World Championships
Gold medal – first place	2011 Daegu	4 × 100 m relay
World Relay Championships
Gold medal – first place	2014 Nassau	4 × 200 m relay
Pan American Junior Championships
Gold medal – first place	2007 São Paulo	200 m
World Youth Championships
Gold medal – first place	2005 Marrakesh	100 m
Gold medal – first place	2005 Marrakesh	Medley relay
Silver medal – second place	2005 Marrakesh	200 m

Bianca Knight (born January 2, 1989) is an American former track and field athlete who competed in the 100 and 200-meter. At the 2012 Summer Olympics she won a team event gold medal in the 4×100 meter relay team. In the final, the quartet of Tianna Madison, Allyson Felix, she and Carmelita Jeter broke a 27-year-old world record. She is currently an assistant track and field coach at Queens University of Charlotte and founder of the Bianca Knight Foundation.

== Early life ==
Knight was born on January 2, 1989, in Pearl, Mississippi. She began competing in track and field at 11 years old. She attended Pearl High School, but was kicked off the school track and field team after eighth grade. This came after her times in the summer competing at the USATF Junior Olympics being better than her high school times. Pearl High School coaches believed that Knight was not trying in high school, however Knight argued that the USATF competition brought out the best in her.

Knight transferred to Ridgeland High School in Ridgeland, Mississippi, winning 15 individual state titles. Including relays, Knight's 23 state titles puts her as one of the most decorated track and field athletes in Mississippi high school history. She was named 2006 female Gatorade Athlete of the Year in track and field in. She is the first Mississippi native to win a Gatorade Athlete of the Year award.

== College career ==
On Feb. 17, 2007, Knight set the national indoor record in the 200 at the Simplot Games in Pocatello, Idaho with a time of 22.97 seconds. The record stood until February 2023, when Mia Brahe-Pedersen ran a 22.89 at the Don Kilby Invitational in Albuquerque, New Mexico.

Knight attended the University of Texas, choosing the Longhorns over the University of Kentucky, Louisiana State University and the University of Southern California. In her lone year for the Longhorns, Knight won the 2008 indoor NCAA 200-meter championship in a collegiate-record time of 22.40. The record stood for 12 years, with Kentucky sprinter Abby Steiner breaking the record with a time of 22.38 in 2021.

After one year competing for Texas, Knight became one of the first athletes in the U.S. to accept a professional contract after their freshman year.

== Professional career ==
Knight signed with Adidas after turning professional following her freshman indoor campaign. She finished fifth at the 2008 U.S. Olympic Trials in the 200 with a time of 22.25 seconds.

Knight ran the first leg of the 4x100 meter relay at the 2011 World Championships in Athletics, in Daegu, South Korea, winning gold with Felix, Marshevet Myers and Jeter with a time of 41.56 seconds.

Knight qualified for the 2012 Summer Olympics in London, joining Madison, Felix and Jeter in the 4x100 meter relay as the third leg. The team ran a 41.64 in the first round, qualifying for the final. The team's time of 40.82 in the final won gold and broke the world record, previously set by East German in 1983.

Knight competed in the 4x200 meter relay at the 2014 IAAF World Relays in Nassau, Bahamas. Alongside Shalonda Solomon, Tawanna Meadows and Kimberlyn Duncan, the U.S. took gold with a time of 1 minute, 29.45 seconds.

== Personal life ==
Knight retired from track and field in 2016 to focus on her family. She has two sons.

Knight founded the Bianca Knight Foundation, which focuses on providing resources to young track and field athletes. In 2021, Knight launched the BKTrackstars app, which offers advice and workout plans for track athletes.

Knight is currently an assistant track and field coach at Queens University of Charlotte. Joining the coaching staff in 2023, Knight serves as a sprints coach for the men's and women's teams.

In 2024, Knight was inducted as an honorary member of the Sigma Gamma Rho sorority.
