= Asha Philip =

English sprinter (born 1990)

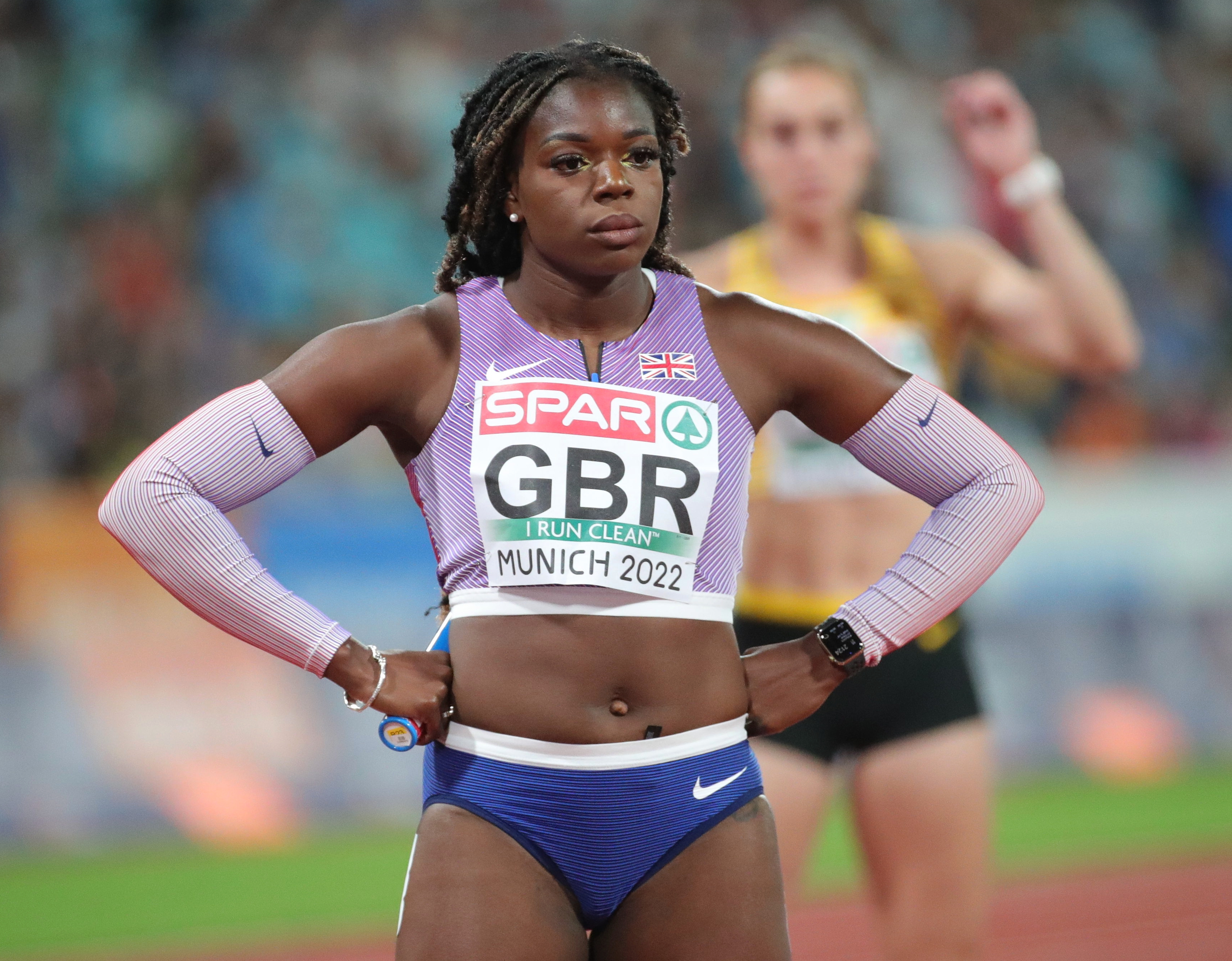
- Philip in 2022

Personal information
- Full name: Asha Solette Philip
- Nationality: British; English
- Born: 25 October 1990 (age 35) Leyton, London, England
- Education: Kingston University
- Height: 1.64 m (5 ft 5 in)
- Weight: 67 kg (148 lb)

Sport
- Country: Great Britain; England
- Sport: Athletics
- Event: 100 metres
- Club: Newham & Essex Beagles
- Coached by: Steve Fudge
Medal record
Women's athletics
Representing Great Britain
Olympic Games
Bronze medal – third place	2016 Rio de Janeiro	4 × 100 m relay
Bronze medal – third place	2020 Tokyo	4 × 100 m relay
World Championships
Silver medal – second place	2017 London	4 × 100 m relay
Silver medal – second place	2019 Doha	4 × 100 m relay
Bronze medal – third place	2023 Budapest	4 × 100 m relay
World Relays
Gold medal – first place	2025 Guangzhou	4 × 100 m relay
Silver medal – second place	2014 Nassau	4 × 200 m relay
Bronze medal – third place	2015 Nassau	4 × 100 m relay
Bronze medal – third place	2025 Guangzhou	mixed 4 × 100 m relay
European Championships
Gold medal – first place	2014 Zürich	4 × 100 m relay
Gold medal – first place	2018 Berlin	4 × 100 m relay
Gold medal – first place	2024 Rome	4 × 100 m relay
Silver medal – second place	2016 Amsterdam	4 × 100 m relay
European Indoor Championships
Gold medal – first place	2017 Belgrade	60 m
Bronze medal – third place	2019 Glasgow	60 m
Representing England
Commonwealth Games
Gold medal – first place	2018 Gold Coast	4 × 100 m relay
Gold medal – first place	2022 Birmingham	4 × 100 m relay
Bronze medal – third place	2014 Glasgow	4 × 100 m relay

Asha Solette Philip (born 25 October 1990) is a retired English sprinter and former junior gymnast specialising in double mini-trampoline. She was the first British woman to achieve a global 100 metres title at any age-group, winning gold at the 2007 World Youth Championships aged 16. Following a serious knee injury in gymnastics in a championship in Quebec at 17, and a rehabilitation period of several years, she returned to athletics full-time in 2014, winning gold at the European Athletics Championships in the 4 × 100 metres relay for Great Britain, and bronze in the same event at the Commonwealth Games for England.

She won her first senior individual title in 2017, claiming gold at the 2017 European Athletics Indoor Championships 60 metres for women, and with Dina Asher-Smith, Desiree Henry and Daryll Neita formed part of the Great Britain 4 × 100 m relay squad which won an Olympic bronze medal in the 4 × 100 metres relay at the 2016 Rio Games. She also won silver medals in the same event at the 2017 and 2019 World Championships. A noted fast starter and 60 metre sprinter, Philip generally runs the first leg on relay duty.

Domestically, Philip is a 10-time national champion with six victories indoors over 60 metres, and four outdoors over 100 metres.

== Career ==
Philip had competed in double mini trampoline since aged 4. She was a World Junior Champion on double mini-trampoline, winning gold in the junior (15–16 years old) girls category in the world age competition in Eindhoven, Netherlands.

In July 2007, Philip won the World Youth Athletics Championships gold in the 100 metres, but shortly afterwards suffered a serious cruciate ligament injury representing Great Britain in the double-mini team event at the senior Trampoline World Championships in Quebec, Canada, which halted her sporting career entirely for three years. This ruled her out of a chance at selection for the 2008 Summer Olympics in Beijing, China.

On her return from injury, Philip completed solely in athletics, and was part of the Great Britain teams that won a silver medal in the 4 × 200 metres relay at the 2014 IAAF World Relays, and a gold medal in the 4 × 100 metres relay at the 2014 European Championships. In the same year, representing England, she won a bronze medal in the 4 × 100 metres relay and finished fourth in the 100 metres final at the 2014 Commonwealth Games.

In 2016, she competed at the Olympic Games in Rio. Philip reached the semi-finals of the 100 metres, but did not qualify for the finals. Philip then went on to win a bronze medal in the 4 × 100 metres relay, along with teammates Desiree Henry, Dina Asher-Smith and Daryll Neita. The quartet set a new British record with a time of 41.77 seconds.

== Personal life ==
Born in Leyton, East London to an Antiguan father and a Jamaican mother, Philip attended Connaught School for Girls in Leytonstone. She graduated from Kingston University in 2012, with a BA (Hons) degree in drama.
