= Estefania Sebastian =

Andorran sprinter

Personal information
- Nationality: Andorran
- Born: 5 September 1982 (age 43)

Sport
- Sport: Track and field
- Event: 60m

Estefania Sebastian (born 5 September 1982) is an Andorran sprinter. She competed in the 60 metres event at the 2014 IAAF World Indoor Championships.
