= Petra Urbánková =

Czech track and field sprinter

Personal information
- Nationality: Czech
- Born: 26 October 1991 (age 34)

Sport
- Country: Czech Republic
- Sport: Athletics
- Events: 100m and 200m

Achievements and titles
- National finals: 2nd (2014)

Petra Urbankova (born 26 October 1991) is a Czech track and field sprinter who competes in the 100 metres and 200 metres. Urbánková was runner-up at the 100 metres at the Czech Athletics Championships in 2014.
