= Inna Eftimova =

Bulgarian sprinter

Personal information
- Born: 19 June 1988 (age 38) Kostinbrod, Bulgaria
- Height: 168 cm (5 ft 6 in)
- Weight: 57 kg (126 lb)

Sport
- Country: Bulgaria
- Sport: Athletics
- Event: 100 metres
Medal record
World Military Championships
Gold medal – first place	2009 Sofia	100 m
Bronze medal – third place	2009 Sofia	200 m

Inna Eftimova (Bulgarian: Инна Ефтимова; born 19 June 1988 in Kostinbrod) is a track and field sprint athlete who competes internationally for Bulgaria.

Eftimova represented Bulgaria at the 2008 Summer Olympics in Beijing. She competed at the 100 metres sprint and placed 4th in her heat without advancing to the second round. She ran the distance in a time of 11.67 seconds.

In May 2012, the Bulgarian athletics federation announced a two-year ban for Eftimova after testing positive for somatotropin at the World Championships held in August 2011 in Daegu, South Korea. As a consequence of the ban she missed the 2012 London Olympics.

In 2019, she competed in the women's 100 metres event at the 2019 World Athletics Championships held in Doha, Qatar. She did not qualify to compete in the semi-finals.
