= Fanette Humair =

Swiss sprinter (born 1991)

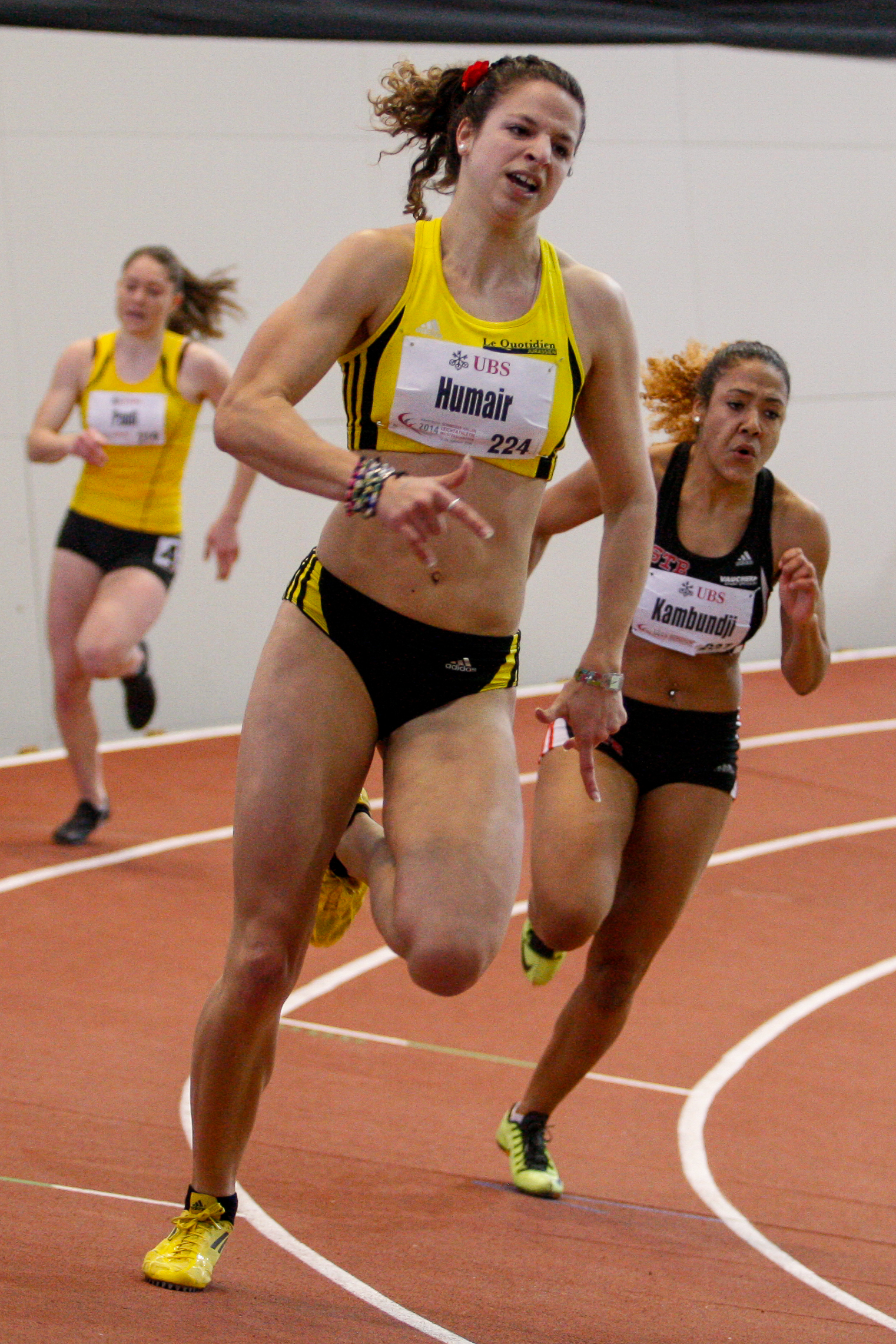
- Fanette Humair in 2014

Personal information
- Nationality: Swiss
- Born: 8 October 1991 (age 34)

Sport
- Sport: Athletics
- Event: Sprinting

Fanette Humair (born 8 October 1991) is a Swiss athlete. She competed in the women's 4 × 400 metres relay event at the 2019 World Athletics Championships.
