= 2016 European Athletics Championships – Women's 4 × 100 metres relay =

Sports competition

Women's 4 × 100 metres relay at the European Athletics Championships
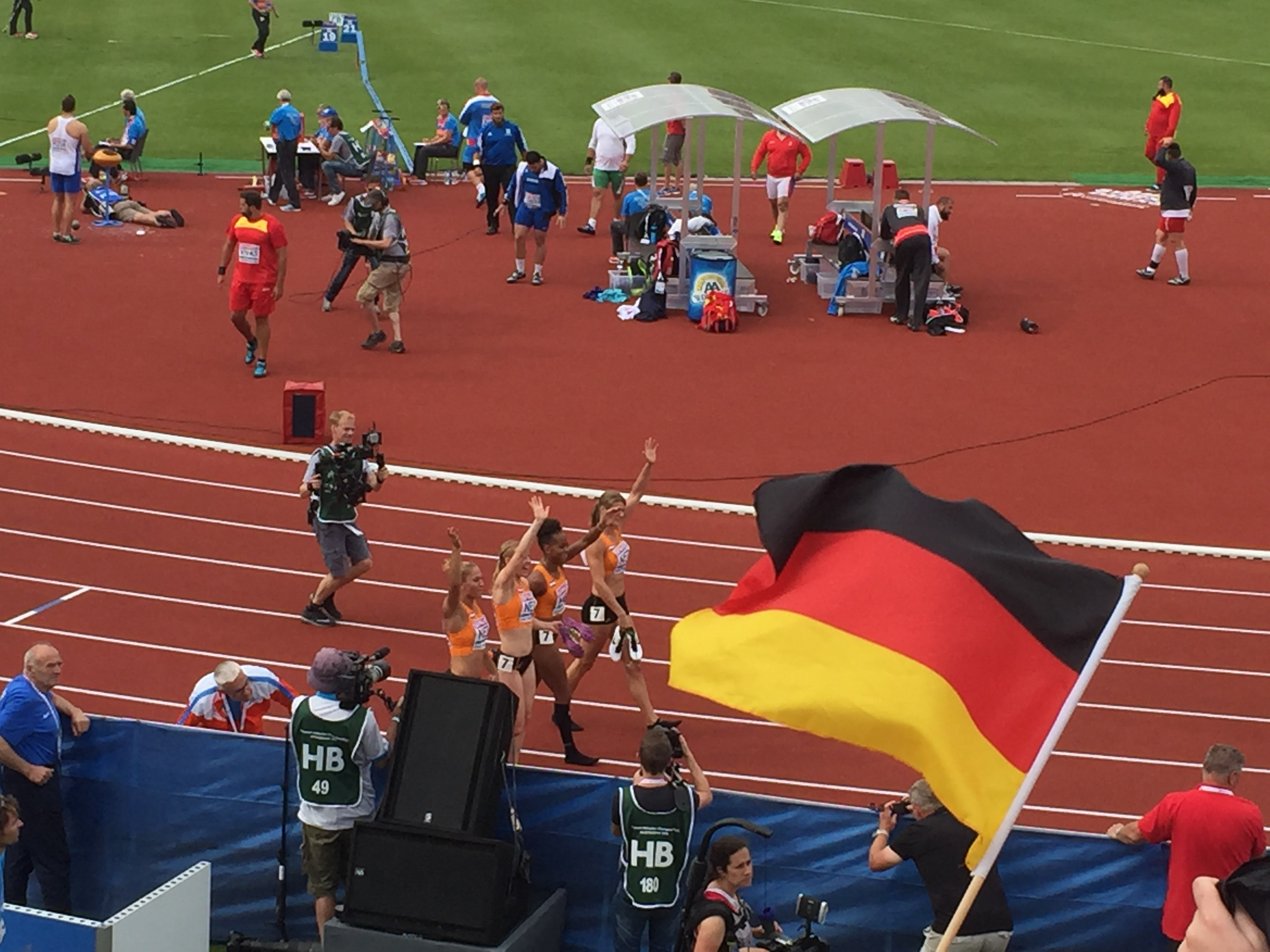
- Venue: Olympic Stadium
- Location: Amsterdam
- Dates: 9 July (round 1); 10 July (final)
- Competitors: 65 from 16 nations
- Winning time: 42.04 NR

Medalists
gold medal	Jamile Samuel; Dafne Schippers; Tessa van Schagen; Naomi Sedney; Marije van Hunenstijn*	Netherlands
silver medal	Asha Philip; Dina Asher-Smith; Bianca Williams; Daryll Neita	Great Britain
bronze medal	Tatjana Pinto; Lisa Mayer; Gina Lückenkemper; Rebekka Haase	Germany

The women's 4 × 100 metres relay at the 2016 European Athletics Championships took place at the Olympic Stadium on 9 and 10 July.

== Records ==
Standing records prior to the 2016 European Athletics Championships
World record	United States (Tianna Madison, Allyson Felix; Bianca Knight, Carmelita Jeter)	40.82	London, Great Britain	10 August 2012
European record	East Germany (Silke Gladisch, Sabine Rieger; Ingrid Auerswald, Marlies Göhr)	41.37	Canberra, Australia	6 October 1985
Championship record	East Germany (Silke Möller, Katrin Krabbe; Kerstin Behrendt, Sabine Günther)	41.68	Split, Yugoslavia	1 September 1990
World Leading	Germany; Tatjana Pinto, Lisa Mayer; Gina Lückenkemper, Rebekka Haase	42.00	Regensburg, Germany	5 June 2016
European Leading	Germany; Tatjana Pinto, Lisa Mayer; Gina Lückenkemper, Rebekka Haase	42.00	Regensburg, Germany	5 June 2016

== Schedule ==
Date	Time	Round
9 July 2016	20:00	Round 1
10 July 2016	17:35	Final

All times are local times (UTC+2)

== Results ==
=== Round 1 ===
First 3 in each heat (Q) and 2 best performers (q) advance to the Final.

Rank	Heat	Nation	Athletes	Time	Notes
1	1	Great Britain	Asha Philip, Dina Asher-Smith, Bianca Williams, Daryll Neita	42.59	Q, SB
2	2	Germany	Tatjana Pinto, Lisa Mayer, Gina Lückenkemper, Rebekka Haase	42.71	Q
3	1	Switzerland	Ajla del Ponte, Sarah Atcho, Ellen Sprunger, Salome Kora	42.87	Q, NR
4	1	Ukraine	Olesya Povh, Nataliya Pohrebnyak, Mariya Ryemyen, Yelizaveta Bryzgina	42.93	Q, SB
5	1	France	Floriane Gnafoua, Céline Distel-Bonnet, Jennifer Galais, Stella Akakpo	43.06	q, SB
6	2	Italy	Irene Siragusa, Gloria Hooper, Martina Amidei, Audrey Alloh	43.33	Q
7	2	Netherlands	Jamile Samuel, Marije van Hunenstijn, Tessa van Schagen, Naomi Sedney	43.34	Q, SB
8	2	Poland	Agata Forkasiewicz, Marika Popowicz-Drapała, Anna Kiełbasińska, Ewa Swoboda	43.59	q, SB
9	1	Cyprus	Olivia Fotopoulou, Ramona Papaioannou, Filippa Fotopoulou, Eleni Artymata	43.87	NR
10	2	Spain	María Isabel Pérez, Nana Jacob, Estela García, Cristina Lara	44.14	SB
11	1	Sweden	Elin Östlund, Linnea Killander, Isabelle Eurenius, Pernilla Nilsson	44.27	SB
12	1	Ireland	Joan Healy, Phil Healy, Sarah Murray, Niamh Whelan	44.29	SB
13	2	Hungary	Fanni Schmelcz, Éva Kaptur, Gréta Kerekes, Anasztázia Nguyen	44.34	=NR
14	2	Greece	Maria Gatou, Elisavet Pesiridou, Ekaterini Dalaka, Maria Belibasaki	44.58	
15	2	Slovakia	Vladimíra Šibová, Lenka Kršáková, Denis Bučková, Alexandra Bezeková	45.31	
	1	Norway	Helene Ronningen, Ida Bakke Hansen, Astrid Mangen Cederkvist, Ezinne Okparaebo	DNF	

=== Final ===
Rank	Lane	Nation	Athletes	Time	Notes
1st place, gold medalist(s)	7	Netherlands	Jamile Samuel, Dafne Schippers, Tessa van Schagen, Naomi Sedney	42.04	NR
2nd place, silver medalist(s)	5	Great Britain	Asha Philip, Dina Asher-Smith, Bianca Williams, Daryll Neita	42.45	SB
3rd place, bronze medalist(s)	4	Germany	Tatjana Pinto, Lisa Mayer, Gina Lückenkemper, Rebekka Haase	42.48	
4	8	Ukraine	Olesya Povh, Nataliya Pohrebnyak, Mariya Ryemyen, Yelizaveta Bryzgina	42.87	SB
5	3	Switzerland	Ajla del Ponte, Sarah Atcho, Ellen Sprunger, Salome Kora	43.00	
6	2	France	Floriane Gnafoua, Céline Distel-Bonnet, Jennifer Galais, Stella Akakpo	43.05	SB
7	1	Poland	Agata Forkasiewicz, Marika Popowicz-Drapała, Anna Kiełbasińska, Ewa Swoboda	43.24	SB
8	6	Italy	Irene Siragusa, Gloria Hooper, Martina Amidei, Audrey Alloh	43.57	
