= 2015 European Athletics U23 Championships – Women's 200 metres =

The women's 200 metres event at the 2015 European Athletics U23 Championships was held in Tallinn, Estonia, at Kadriorg Stadium on 10 and 11 July.

== Medalists ==
Gold	Rebekka Haase; Germany
Silver	Anna-Lena Freese; Germany
Bronze	Brigitte Ntiamoah; France

== Results ==
=== Final ===
11 July
Wind: 0.6 m/s

Rank	Name	Nationality	Reaction Time	Time	Notes
1st place, gold medalist(s)	Rebekka Haase	Germany	0.178	23.16	
2nd place, silver medalist(s)	Anna-Lena Freese	Germany	0.188	23.22	PB
3rd place, bronze medalist(s)	Brigitte Ntiamoah	France	0.194	23.49	
4	Tessa Van Schagen	Netherlands	0.194	23.59	
5	Zofia Wróblewska	Poland	0.160	23.76	=PB
6	Sarah Atcho	Switzerland	0.186	23.85	
7	Charlène Keller	Switzerland	0.139	23.87	SB
8	Daniella Busk	Sweden	0.162	24.07	

=== Heats ===
10 July

==== Heat 1 ====
Wind: 1.4 m/s

Rank	Name	Nationality	Reaction Time	Time	Notes
1	Rebekka Haase	Germany	0.194	23.14	SB Q
2	Sarah Atcho	Switzerland	0.157	23.52	PB Q
3	Daniella Busk	Sweden	0.179	23.61	PB q
4	Eva Berger	France	0.223	23.70	
5	Johanelis Herrera Abreu	Italy	0.142	23.80	SB
6	Cristina Lara	Spain	0.145	23.85	PB
7	Astrid Cederkvist	Norway	0.149	24.45	

==== Heat 2 ====
Wind: 2.3 m/s

Rank	Name	Nationality	Reaction Time	Time	Notes
1	Tessa Van Schagen	Netherlands	0.182	23.35 w	Q
2	Charlène Keller	Switzerland	0.156	23.54 w	Q
3	Anna Bongiorni	Italy	0.151	23.67 w	
4	Lucija Pokos	Croatia	0.171	23.70 w	
5	Agata Forkasiewicz	Poland	0.159	23.83 w	
6	Ida Bakke Hansen	Norway	0.166	23.88 w	
7	Matilda Hellqvist	Sweden	0.160	24.06 w	
8	Cátia Santos	Portugal	0.165	24.36 w	

==== Heat 3 ====
Wind: 3.2 m/s

Rank	Name	Nationality	Reaction Time	Time	Notes
1	Brigitte Ntiamoah	France	0.203	23.19 w	Q
2	Anna-Lena Freese	Germany	0.207	23.26 w	Q
3	Zofia Wróblewska	Poland	0.181	23.61 w	q
4	Irene Siragusa	Italy	0.164	24.06 w	
5	Linnea Killander	Sweden	0.222	24.13 w	
6	Charlotte Wingfield	Malta	0.166	24.25 w	
7	Christine Bjelland Jensen	Norway	0.169	24.27 w	
8	Rivinilda Mentai	Portugal	0.297	24.43 w	

== Participation ==
According to an unofficial count, 23 athletes from 12 countries participated in the event.

- Croatia (1)
- France (2)
- Germany (2)
- Italy (3)
- Malta (1)
- Netherlands (1)
- Norway (3)
- Poland (2)
- Portugal (2)
- Spain (1)
- Sweden (3)
- Switzerland (2)
