= 2015 European Athletics U23 Championships – Women's 100 metres =

The women's 100 metres event at the 2015 European Athletics U23 Championships was held in Tallinn, Estonia, at Kadriorg Stadium on 9 and 10 July.

== Medalists ==
Gold	Rebekka Haase; Germany
Silver	Alexandra Burghardt; Germany
Bronze	Stella Akakpo; France

== Results ==
=== Final ===
10 July
Wind: -0.2 m/s

Rank	Name	Nationality	Reaction Time	Time	Notes
1st place, gold medalist(s)	Rebekka Haase	Germany	0.178	11.47	
2nd place, silver medalist(s)	Alexandra Burghardt	Germany	0.170	11.54	
3rd place, bronze medalist(s)	Stella Akakpo	France	0.151	11.55	
4	Naomi Sedney	Netherlands	0.190	11.62	
5	Anasztázia Nguyen	Hungary	0.150	11.75	
6	Irene Siragusa	Italy	0.143	11.75	
7	Milja Thureson	Finland	0.164	11.79	
8	Agata Forkasiewicz	Poland	0.153	11.98	

=== Heats ===
9 July

==== Heat 1 ====
Wind: -1.8 m/s

Rank	Name	Nationality	Reaction Time	Time	Notes
1	Stella Akakpo	France	0.149	11.56	Q
2	Naomi Sedney	Netherlands	0.204	11.64	Q
3	Cliodhna Manning	Ireland	0.162	11.79	
4	Anna Bongiorni	Italy	0.192	11.79	
5	Daniella Busk	Sweden	0.206	11.84	
6	Milana Tirnanić	Serbia	0.167	11.94	
7	Astrid Cederkvist	Norway	0.160	12.23	
8	Diana Khubeseryan	Armenia	0.156	12.51	

==== Heat 2 ====
Wind: 0.6 m/s

Rank	Name	Nationality	Reaction Time	Time	Notes
1	Rebekka Haase	Germany	0.183	11.25	Q
2	Milja Thureson	Finland	0.160	11.62	PB Q
3	Irene Siragusa	Italy	0.148	11.77	q
4	Charlotte Wingfield	Malta	0.148	11.78	
5	Cristina Lara	Spain	0.163	11.83	
6	Katarzyna Sokólska	Poland	0.202	11.92	
7	Olimpia Barbosa	Portugal	0.205	11.94	

==== Heat 3 ====
Wind: -0.4 m/s

Rank	Name	Nationality	Reaction Time	Time	Notes
1	Alexandra Burghardt	Germany	0.193	11.52	Q
2	Anasztázia Nguyen	Hungary	0.153	11.59	Q
3	Agata Forkasiewicz	Poland	0.162	11.76	q
4	Phil Healy	Ireland	0.148	11.81	
5	Anniina Kortetmaa	Finland	0.184	11.88	
6	Martina Favaretto	Italy	0.178	12.06	
7	Salomé Kora	Switzerland	0.219	12.07	
8	Valbona Selimi	North Macedonia	0.168	13.00	

== Participation ==
According to an unofficial count, 23 athletes from 17 countries participated in the event.

- Armenia (1)
- Finland (2)
- France (1)
- Germany (2)
- Hungary (1)
- Ireland (2)
- Italy (3)
- North Macedonia (1)
- Malta (1)
- Netherlands (1)
- Norway (1)
- Poland (2)
- Portugal (1)
- Serbia (1)
- Spain (1)
- Sweden (1)
- Switzerland (1)
