= 2012 World Junior Championships in Athletics – Women's 4 × 100 metres relay =

The women's 4 × 100 metres relay at the 2012 World Junior Championships in Athletics was held at the Estadi Olímpic Lluís Companys on 13 and 14 July.

== Medalists ==
Gold	Silver	Bronze
United States; Morgan Snow; Dezerea Bryant; Jennifer Madu; Shayla Sanders	Germany; Alexandra Burghardt; Ida Mayer; Katharina Grompe; Jessie Maduka	Brazil; Camila de Souza; Tamiris de Liz; Nathalia da Rosa; Jéssica Carolina dos Reis

== Records ==
Prior to the competition, the existing world junior and championship records were as follows.

World Junior Record	United States Blue (Bianca Knight, Jeneba Tarmoh, Elizabeth Olear, Gabrielle Mayo)	43.29	Eugene, OR, United States	8 August 2006
Championship Record	Jamaica (Sherone Simpson, Kerron Stewart, Anneisha McLaughlin, Simone Facey)	43.40	Kingston, Jamaica	21 July 2002
World Junior Leading	United States Young Achievers A (Keana Gray, Tristie Johnson, Shayla Sanders, Kali Davis-White)	44.39	Orlando, FL, United States	26 May 2012
Broken records during the 2012 World Junior Championships in Athletics
World Junior Leading	United States (Morgan Snow, Dezerea Bryant, Jennifer Madu, Shayla Sanders)	43.89	Barcelona, Spain	14 July 2012

== Results ==
=== Heats ===
Qualification: First 2 of each heat (Q) plus the 2 fastest times (q) qualified

Rank	Heat	Lane	Nation	Athletes	Time	Notes
1	1	7	United States	Morgan Snow, Kali Davis-White, Jennifer Madu, Shayla Sanders	43.95	Q, WJL
2	3	7	Germany	Alexandra Burghardt, Ida Mayer, Katharina Grompe, Jessie Maduka	44.27	Q, SB
3	2	4	Great Britain	Annie Tagoe, Hannah Thomas, Rachel Johncock, Sophie Papps	44.47	Q, SB
4	3	6	Nigeria	Josephine Ada Omaka, Wisdom Isoken, Goodness Thomas, Stephanie Kalu	44.58	Q, SB
5	1	4	Netherlands	Miquella Lobo, Tessa van Schagen, Naomi Sedney, Marloes Duijn	44.68	Q, SB
6	2	7	Brazil	Thais Vides, Tamiris de Liz, Nathalia da Rosa, Camila de Souza	44.79	Q, SB
7	2	8	Belgium	Orphée Depuydt, Camille Laus, Imke Vervaet, Justien Grillet	44.88	q, NJ
8	3	4	Poland	Zuzanna Kalinowska, Katarzyna Sokólska, Angelika Stępień, Kamila Ciba	45.02	q, SB
9	3	5	Italy	Elisa Paiero, Irene Siragusa, Anna Bongiorni, Udochi Ekeh	45.15	SB
10	3	8	Switzerland	Nora Frey, Sara Atcho, Charlène Keller, Samantha Dagry	45.61	
	1	8	Australia	Carla Williams, Monica Brennan, Ella Nelson, Ashleigh Whittaker	DQ	
	2	3	Canada	Clémence Paiement, Khamica Bingham, Isatu Fofanah, Shai-Anne Davis	DQ	
	2	5	Spain	Cristina Lara, Paula Llistosella, Sonia Molina-Prados, María Isabel Pérez	DQ	
	3	3	South Africa	Chante van Tonder, Philippa van der Merwe, Zanri van der Merwe, Nabeela Parker	DQ	
	1	5	Bahamas	Devynne Charlton, Carmiesha Cox, Rashan Brown, Anthonique Strachan	DNF	
	2	6	Jamaica	Monique Spencer, Shawnette Lewin, Christania Williams, Deandre Whitehorne	DNF	
	1	6	Slovenia	Laura Strajnar, Kaja Debevec, Tina Slejko, Maja Petrovic	DNF	
	1	3	China		DNS	

=== Final ===
Rank	Lane	Nation	Athletes	Time	Notes
1st place, gold medalist(s)	9	United States	Morgan Snow, Dezerea Bryant, Jennifer Madu, Shayla Sanders	43.89	WJL
2nd place, silver medalist(s)	6	Germany	Alexandra Burghardt, Ida Mayer, Katharina Grompe, Jessie Maduka	44.24	SB
3rd place, bronze medalist(s)	3	Brazil	Camila de Souza, Tamiris de Liz, Nathalia da Rosa, Jéssica Carolina dos Reis	44.29	SB
4	1	Poland	Zuzanna Kalinowska, Katarzyna Sokólska, Angelika Stępień, Kamila Ciba	44.95	SB
5	2	Belgium	Orphée Depuydt, Camille Laus, Imke Vervaet, Justien Grillet	45.12	
6	7	Netherlands	Miquella Lobo, Tessa van Schagen, Naomi Sedney, Marloes Duijn	45.22	
	8	Great Britain	Dina Asher-Smith, Rachel Johncock, Desiree Henry, Sophie Papps	DNF	
	5	Nigeria	Josephine Ada Omaka, Wisdom Isoken, Goodness Thomas, Stephanie Kalu	DQ	

== Participation ==
According to an unofficial count, 72 athletes from 17 countries participated in the event.

- Australia (4)
- Bahamas (4)
- Belgium (4)
- Brazil (5)
- Canada (4)
- Germany (4)
- Italy (4)
- Jamaica (4)
- Netherlands (4)
- Nigeria (4)
- Poland (4)
- Slovenia (4)
- South Africa (4)
- Spain (4)
- Switzerland (4)
- United Kingdom (6)
- United States (5)
