= 2016 European Athletics Championships – Women's 200 metres =

Women's 200 metres at the 2016 European Athletics Championships
- Venue: Olympic Stadium
- Location: Amsterdam
- Dates: July 6 (round 1); July 7 (semifinals & final)
- Competitors: 36 from 20 nations
- Winning time: 22.37

Medalists
gold medal	Dina Asher-Smith	Great Britain
silver medal	Ivet Lalova-Collio	Bulgaria
bronze medal	Gina Lückenkemper	Germany

The women's 200 metres at the 2016 European Athletics Championships took place at the Olympic Stadium in Amsterdam on 6 and 7 July.

== Records ==
Standing records prior to the 2016 European Athletics Championships
World record	Florence Griffith-Joyner (USA)	21.34	Seoul, South Korea	29 September 1988
European record	Dafne Schippers (NED)	21.63	Beijing, China	28 August 2015
Championship record	Heike Drechsler (GDR)	21.71	Stuttgart, West Germany	29 August 1986
World Leading	Dafne Schippers (NED)	21.93	Oslo, Norway	9 June 2016
European Leading	Dafne Schippers (NED)	21.93	Oslo, Norway	9 June 2016

== Schedule ==
Date	Time	Round
6 July 2016	12:10	Round 1
6 July 2016	17:30	Semifinal
7 July 2016	19:10	Final

All times are local times (UTC+2)

== Results ==
=== Round 1 ===
First 3 in each heat (Q) and the next fastest 4 (q) advance to the Semifinals.

Wind:
Heat 1: +0.9 m/s, Heat 2: +1.1 m/s, Heat 3: +0.2 m/s, Heat 4: +0.7 m/s

Rank	Heat	Lane	Name	Nationality	Time	Note
1	3	5	Maja Mihalinec	Slovenia	23.01	Q, PB
2	4	6	Maria Belibasaki	Greece	23.03	Q, PB
3	2	4	Jamile Samuel	Netherlands	23.04	Q, =SB
4	3	4	Nadine Gonska	Germany	23.13	Q
5	4	2	Mujinga Kambundji	Switzerland	23.20	Q
6	2	3	Anna Kiełbasińska	Poland	23.21	Q, SB
6	3	8	Ellen Sprunger	Switzerland	23.21	Q, PB
8	1	7	Laura de Witte	Netherlands	23.23	Q, PB
9	2	7	Yelizaveta Bryzgina	Ukraine	23.37	Q
10	1	8	Estela García	Spain	23.40	Q
11	4	8	Nana Jacob	Spain	23.43	Q
12	1	6	Eleni Artymata	Cyprus	23.46	Q
13	2	2	Sabina Veit	Slovenia	23.47	q
14	1	3	Agata Forkasiewicz	Poland	23.53	q, PB
15	4	3	Alexandra Bezeková	Slovakia	23.56	q
16	2	6	Inna Eftimova	Bulgaria	23.58	q
17	2	5	Cornelia Halbheer	Switzerland	23.61	
18	1	4	Olivia Borlée	Belgium	23.64	
19	3	6	Mariya Ryemyen	Ukraine	23.67	
20	4	7	Klaudia Konopko	Poland	23.76	
21	4	4	Martina Amidei	Italy	23.79	
22	1	5	Irene Siragusa	Italy	23.87	
23	3	7	Olga Lenskiy	Israel	23.90	
24	1	2	Marcela Pírková	Czech Republic	24.03	
25	3	2	Pernilla Nilsson	Sweden	24.18	
26	3	3	Charlotte Wingfield	Malta	24.46	
27	4	5	Diana Khubeseryan	Armenia	25.56	
28	2	8	Zyanne Hook	Gibraltar	26.78	

=== Semifinals ===
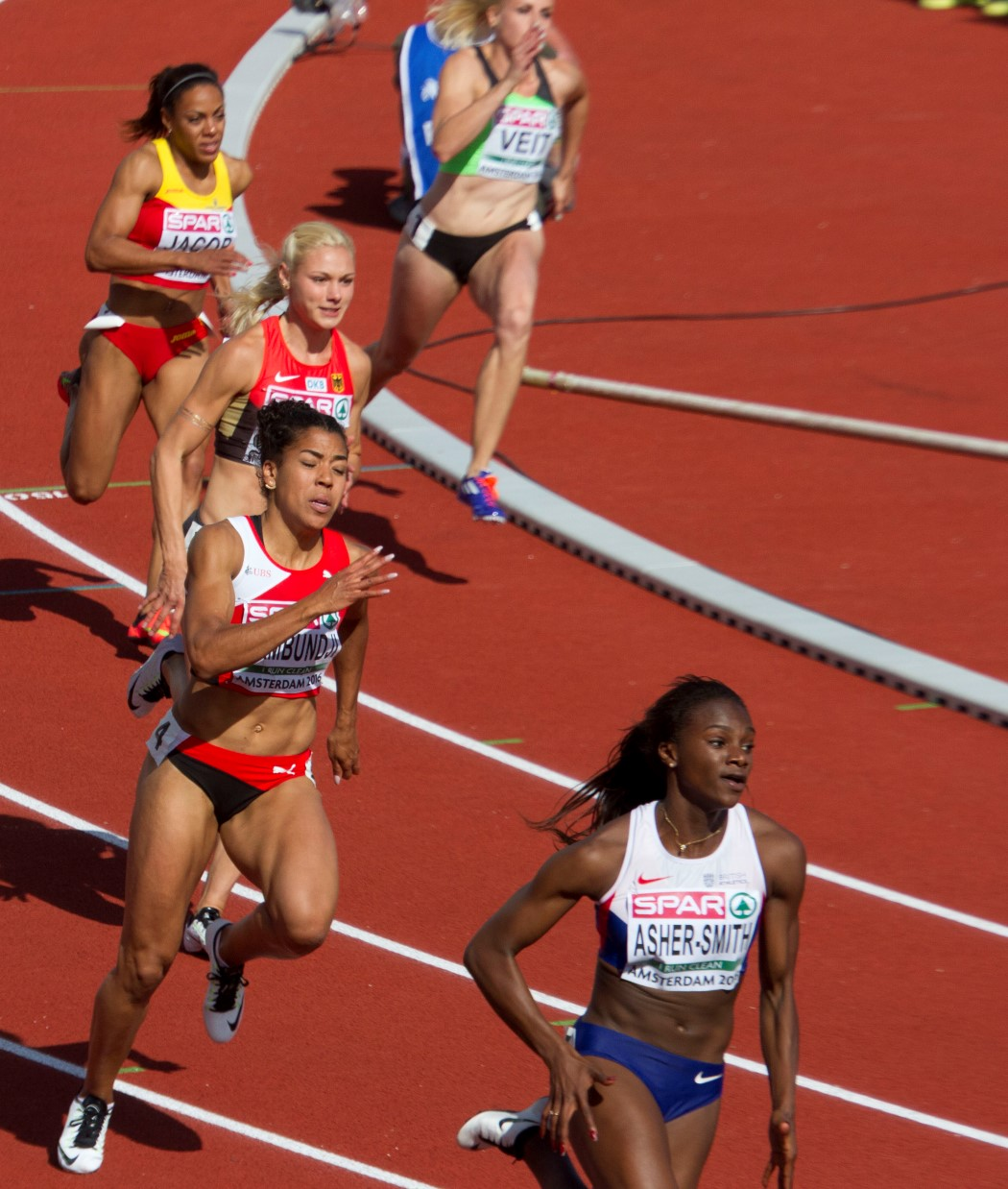
Semifinal 2

First 2 in each heat (Q) and the next fastest 2 (q) advance to the Semifinals.

Wind:
Heat 1: 0.0 m/s, Heat 2: 0.0 m/s, Heat 3: +1.3 m/s

Rank	Heat	Lane	Name	Nationality	Time	Note
1	2	5	Dina Asher-Smith*	Great Britain	22.57	Q, SB
1	3	4	Ivet Lalova-Collio*	Bulgaria	22.57	Q, SB
3	1	5	Gina Luckenkemper*	Germany	22.90	Q
4	2	6	Tessa van Schagen*	Netherlands	22.95	Q
5	3	6	Nataliya Pohrebnyak*	Ukraine	22.98	Q
6	1	7	Jamile Samuel	Netherlands	23.02	Q, SB
7	2	3	Lisa Mayer*	Germany	23.06	q
8	1	3	Jodie Williams*	Great Britain	23.14	q
9	1	6	Maria Belibasaki	Greece	23.16	
10	3	5	Maja Mihalinec	Slovenia	23.17	
11	2	4	Mujinga Kambundji	Switzerland	23.23	
12	3	3	Nadine Gonska	Germany	23.24	
13	1	4	Gloria Hooper*	Italy	23.25	
14	2	7	Anna Kiełbasińska	Poland	23.36	
15	2	2	Nana Jacob	Spain	23.45	
16	3	1	Laura de Witte	Netherlands	23.48	
17	3	8	Estela García	Spain	23.53	
18	1	8	Ellen Sprunger	Switzerland	23.54	
18	3	2	Inna Eftimova	Bulgaria	23.54	
20	3	7	Eleni Artymata	Cyprus	23.58	
21	1	2	Agata Forkasiewicz	Poland	23.59	
22	2	8	Yelizaveta Bryzgina	Ukraine	23.64	
23	1	1	Alexandra Bezeková	Slovakia	23.71	
24	2	1	Sabina Veit	Slovenia	23.72	

*Athletes who received a bye to the semifinals

=== Final ===
Wind: -0.4 m/s

Rank	Lane	Name	Nationality	Time	Note
1st place, gold medalist(s)	5	Dina Asher-Smith	Great Britain	22.37	SB
2nd place, silver medalist(s)	4	Ivet Lalova-Collio	Bulgaria	22.52	SB
3rd place, bronze medalist(s)	6	Gina Lückenkemper	Germany	22.74	
4	7	Jamile Samuel	Netherlands	22.83	SB
5	8	Nataliya Pohrebnyak	Ukraine	22.84	
6	1	Jodie Williams	Great Britain	22.96	
7	3	Tessa van Schagen	Netherlands	23.03	
8	2	Lisa Mayer	Germany	23.10	
