= 2015 European Athletics U23 Championships – Women's 4 × 100 metres relay =

The women's 4×100 metres relay event at the 2015 European Athletics U23 Championships was held in Tallinn, Estonia, at Kadriorg Stadium on 12 July.

== Medalists ==
Gold	Amelie-Sophie Lederer; Alexandra Burghardt; Rebekka Haase; Anna-Lena Freese; Germany
Silver	Martina Favaretto; Irene Siragusa; Anna Bongiorni; Johanelis Herrera Abreu; Italy
Bronze	Lena Weiss; Sarah Atcho; Charlène Keller; Noemi Zbären; Switzerland

== Results ==
=== Final ===
12 July

Rank	Name	Nationality	Reaction Time	Time	Notes
1st place, gold medalist(s)	Germany	Amelie-Sophie Lederer; Alexandra Burghardt; Rebekka Haase; Anna-Lena Freese	0.180	43.47	
2nd place, silver medalist(s)	Italy	Martina Favaretto; Irene Siragusa; Anna Bongiorni; Johanelis Herrera Abreu	0.162	44.06	
3rd place, bronze medalist(s)	Switzerland	Lena Weiss; Sarah Atcho; Charlène Keller; Noemi Zbären	0.167	44.24	NUR
4	Netherlands	Sacha van Agt; Tessa van Schagen; Naomi Sedney; Eefje Boons	0.211	44.46	
5	Poland	Agata Forkasiewicz; Kamila Ciba; Katarzyna Sokólska; Karolina Zagajewska	0.158	44.54	
6	Czech Republic	Lucie Domská; Karolína Hlavatá; Martina Hofmanová; Lucie Koudelová	0.136	44.91	
7	Sweden	Jessica Östlund; Matilda Hellqvist; Daniella Busk; Caroline Larsson	0.151	44.96	
	Ireland	Sarah McCarthy; Cliodhna Manning; Sarah Lavin; Phil Healy	0.157	DNF	

=== Heats ===
12 July

==== Heat 1 ====
Rank	Nation	Competitors	Reaction Time	Time	Notes
1	Germany	Amelie-Sophie Lederer; Alexandra Burghardt; Rebekka Haase; Anna-Lena Freese	0.174	43.62	Q
2	Ireland	Sarah McCarthy; Cliodhna Manning; Sarah Lavin; Phil Healy	0.156	44.68	NUR Q
3	Poland	Agata Forkasiewicz; Kamila Ciba; Katarzyna Sokólska; Sylwia Kasjanowicz	0.156	44.70	Q
4	Sweden	Jessica Östlund; Linnea Killander; Daniella Busk; Caroline Larsson	0.157	44.77	q
	Finland	Milja Thureson; Anna Julin; Anniina Kortetmaa; Riikka Kokko	0.161	DQ	
	Portugal	Vera Fernandes; Olimpia Barbosa; Cátia Santos; Rivinilda Mentai	0.200	DNF	

==== Heat 2 ====
Rank	Nation	Competitors	Reaction Time	Time	Notes
1	Italy	Martina Favaretto; Irene Siragusa; Anna Bongiorni; Johanelis Herrera Abreu	0.152	44.16	Q
2	Netherlands	Sacha van Agt; Tessa van Schagen; Naomi Sedney; Eefje Boons	0.202	44.46	Q
3	Switzerland	Lena Weiss; Sarah Atcho; Charlène Keller; Noemi Zbären	0.160	44.47	NUR Q
4	Czech Republic	Lucie Domská; Karolína Hlavatá; Martina Hofmanová; Lucie Koudelová	0.131	44.74	q
5	Norway	Astrid Cederkvist; Ida Bakke Hansen; Agathe Holtan Wathne; Marlen Aakre	0.140	46.19	
6	Latvia	Evija Šēfere; Ingūna Čeiko; Gunta Latiševa-Čudare; Diana Daktere	0.169	46.65	

== Participation ==
According to an unofficial count, 50 athletes from 12 countries participated in the event.

- Czech Republic (4)
- Finland (4)
- Germany (4)
- Ireland (4)
- Italy (4)
- Latvia (4)
- Netherlands (4)
- Norway (4)
- Poland (5)
- Portugal (4)
- Sweden (5)
- Switzerland (4)
