= 2017 European Athletics Indoor Championships – Women's 60 metres =

The women's 60 metres event at the 2017 European Athletics Indoor Championships was held on 4 March 2017 at 9:45 (heats), on 5 March at 16:00 (semifinals) and 18:10 (final) local time.

== Medalists ==
Gold	Silver	Bronze
Asha Philip; Great Britain	Ewa Swoboda; Poland	Mujinga Kambundji; Switzerland

== Records ==
Standing records prior to the 2017 European Athletics Indoor Championships
World record	Irina Privalova (RUS)	6.92	Madrid, Spain	11 February 1993
World record	Irina Privalova (RUS)	6.92	Madrid, Spain	9 February 1995
European record	Irina Privalova (RUS)	6.92	Madrid, Spain	11 February 1993
European record	Irina Privalova (RUS)	6.92	Madrid, Spain	9 February 1995
Championship record	Nelli Cooman (NED)	7.00	Madrid, Spain	23 February 1986
World Leading	Elaine Thompson (JAM)	6.98	Birmingham, United Kingdom	18 February 2017
European Leading	Dina Asher-Smith (GBR)	7.13	Karlsruhe, Germany	4 February 2017

== Results ==
=== Heats ===
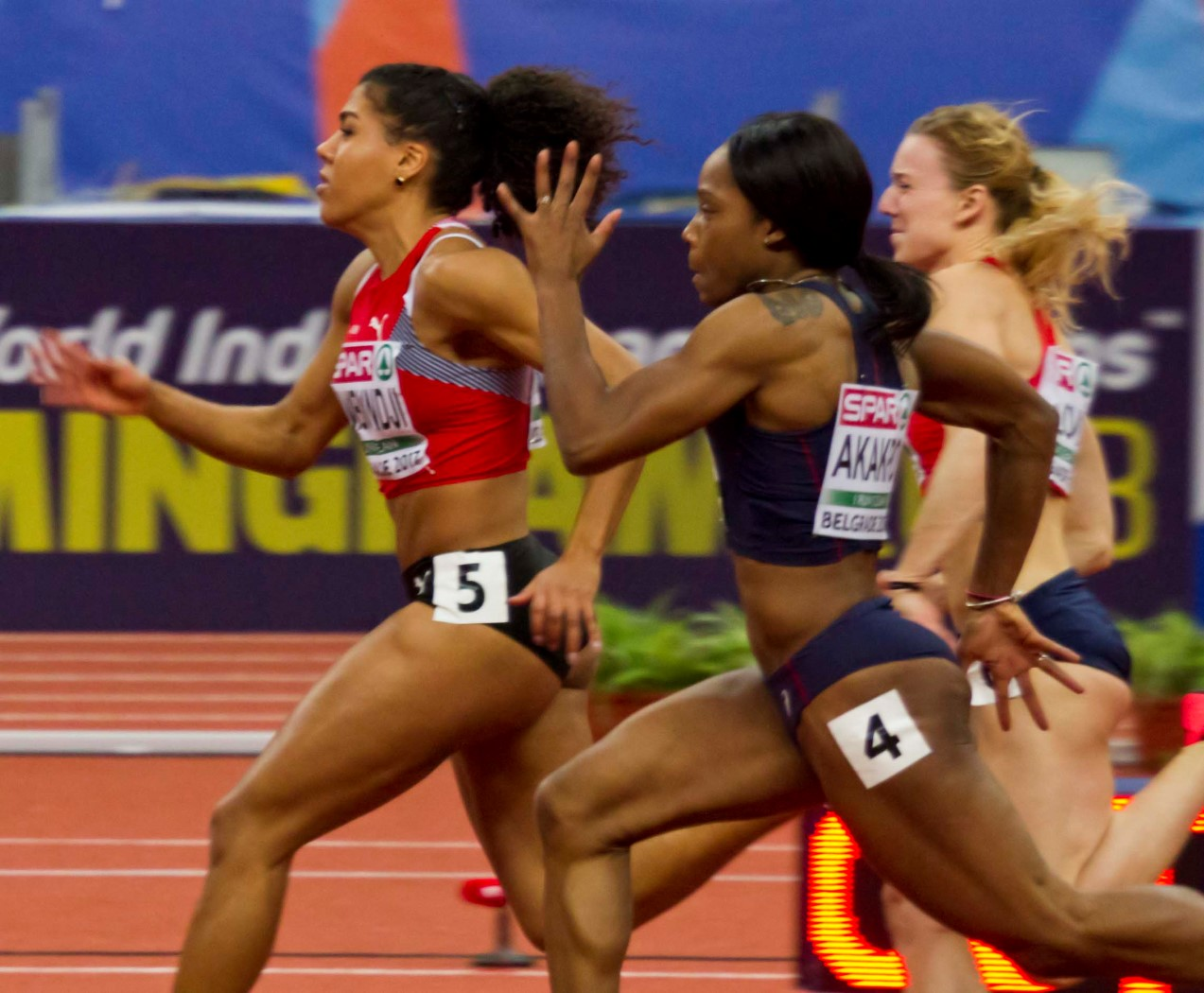
Heat 3

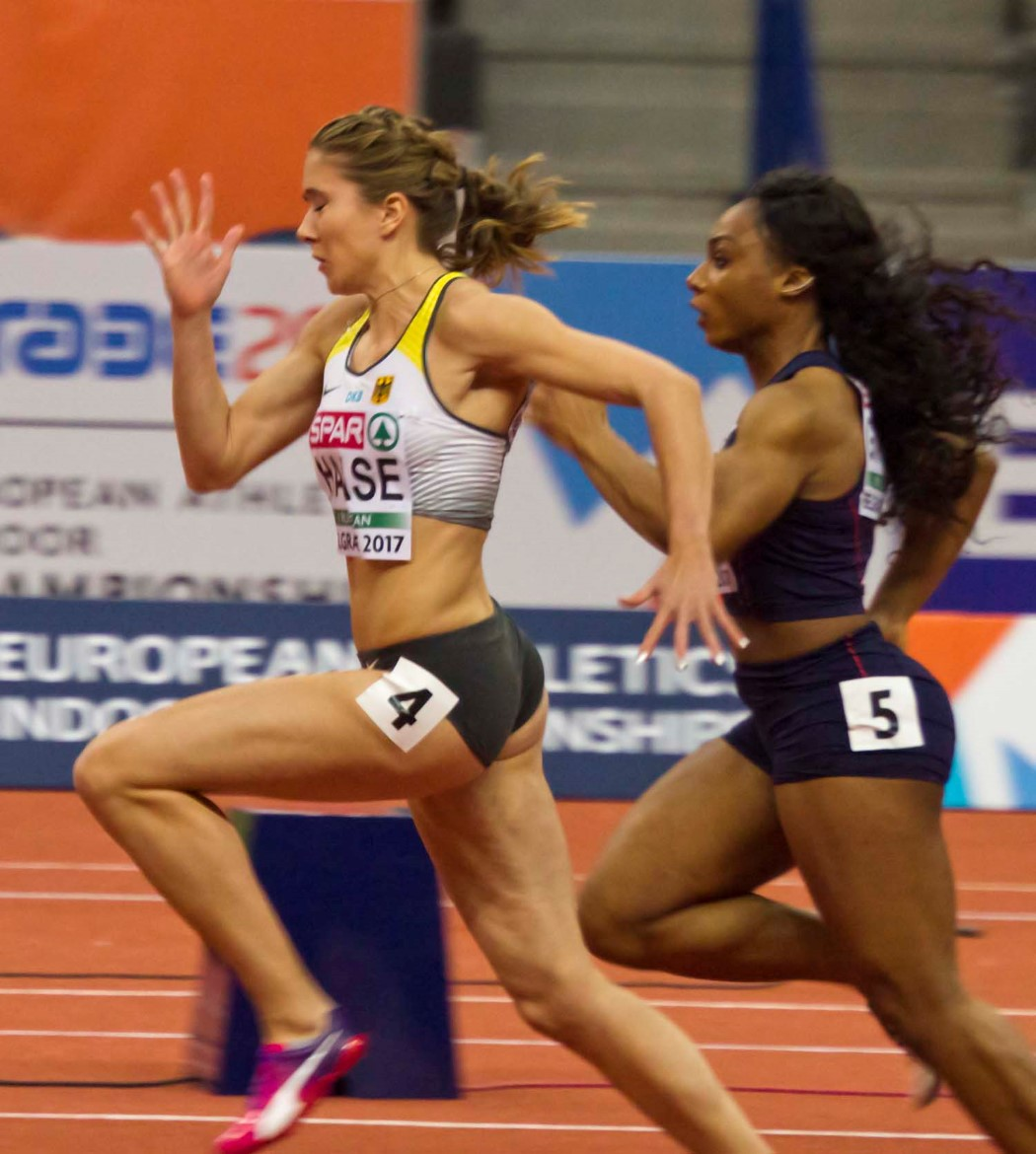
Heat 4

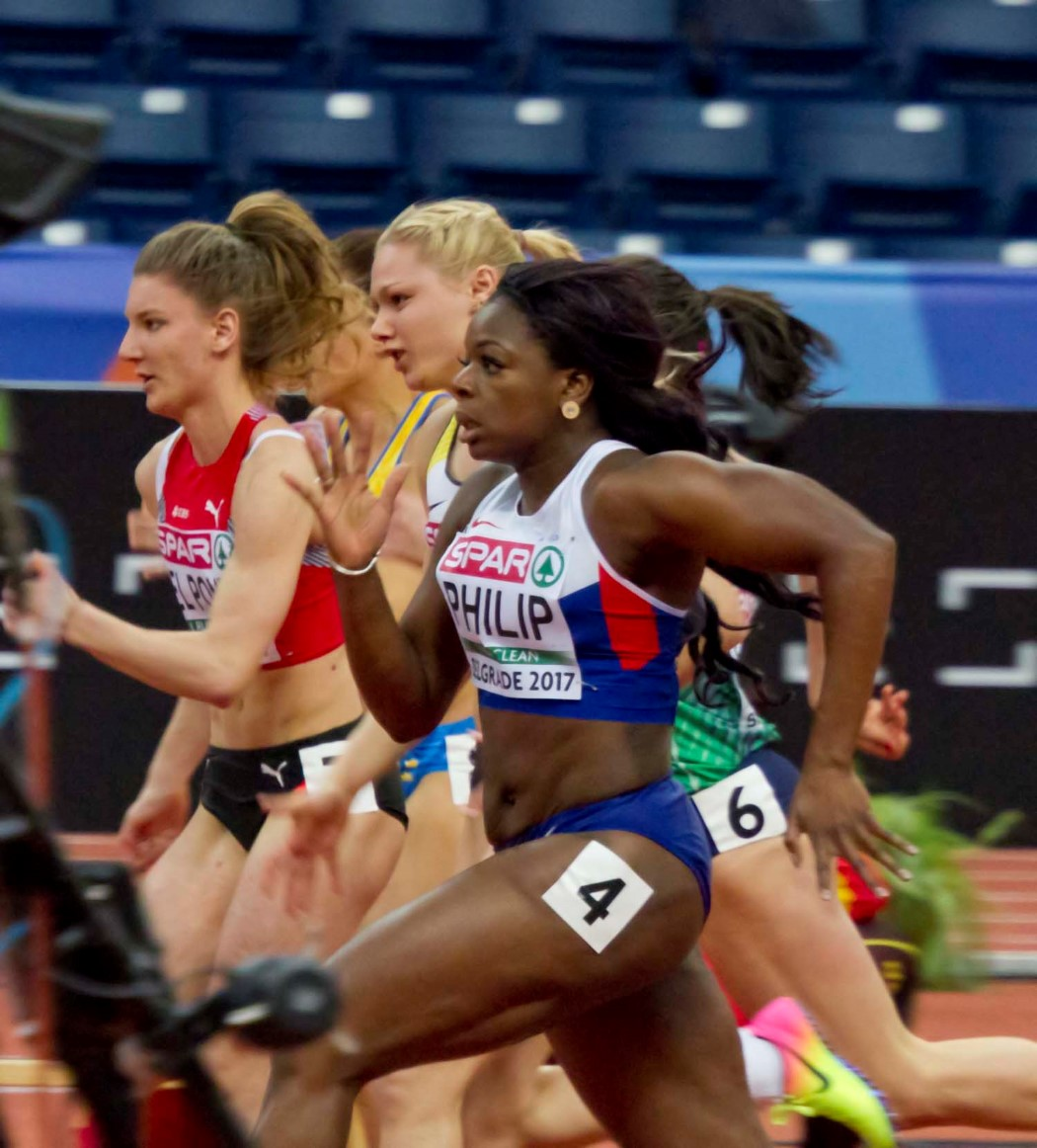
Heat 5

Qualification: First 4 in each heat (Q) and the next 4 fastest (q) advance to the Semifinal.

Rank	Heat	Athlete	Nationality	Time	Note
1	4	Rebekka Haase	Germany	7.14	Q
2	1	Ewa Swoboda	Poland	7.21	Q
3	1	Alexandra Burghardt	Germany	7.22	Q
4	2	Olesya Povh	Ukraine	7.24	Q
4	3	Mujinga Kambundji	Switzerland	7.24	Q
6	5	Asha Philip	Great Britain	7.25	Q
6	4	Floriane Gnafoua	France	7.25	Q
8	5	Lisa Mayer	Germany	7.26	Q
9	3	Stella Akakpo	France	7.28	Q
10	3	Klára Seidlová	Czech Republic	7.35	Q
10	4	Gloria Hooper	Italy	7.35	Q
10	5	Ajla Del Ponte	Switzerland	7.35	Q, PB
13	4	Sarah Atcho	Switzerland	7.36	Q
14	2	Anniina Kortetmaa	Finland	7.39	Q
14	5	Phil Healy	Ireland	7.39	Q
16	2	Inna Eftimova	Bulgaria	7.40	Q
16	4	Helene Rønningen	Norway	7.40	q, SB
18	2	Krystsina Tsimanouskaya	Belarus	7.42	Q
18	2	Anna Bongiorni	Italy	7.42	q
20	5	Elin Östlund	Sweden	7.43	q
21	3	Ciara Neville	Ireland	7.46	Q
21	4	Agata Forkasiewicz	Poland	7.46	q
23	1	Cristina Lara	Spain	7.47	Q
24	3	Ramona Papaioannou	Cyprus	7.48	SB
25	1	Lorène Bazolo	Portugal	7.49	Q
25	4	Alexandra Bezeková	Slovakia	7.49	SB
27	1	Gladys Bamane	Sweden	7.50	
27	2	Charlotte Wingfield	Malta	7.50	
27	2	Sindija Bukša	Latvia	7.50	
30	1	Barbora Procházková	Czech Republic	7.51	
31	3	Viktoriya Kashcheyeva	Ukraine	7.52	
32	3	Anasztázia Nguyen	Hungary	7.53	
33	1	Diana Vaisman	Israel	7.54	
34	3	Stephanie Bendrat	Austria	7.55	
35	5	Milana Tirnanić	Serbia	7.56	
36	5	Gayane Chiloyan	Armenia	7.58	
37	1	Zyanne Hook	Gibraltar	8.33	NR
	5	Rafailía Spanoudáki-Hatziríga	Greece	DQ	R162.7

=== Semifinals ===
Qualification: First 2 in each semifinal (Q) and the next 2 fastest (q) advance to the Final.

Rank	Heat	Athlete	Nationality	Time	Note
1	1	Olesya Povh	Ukraine	7.16	Q
2	3	Mujinga Kambundji	Switzerland	7.19	Q
3	3	Rebekka Haase	Germany	7.19	Q
4	2	Asha Philip	Great Britain	7.20	Q
5	1	Floriane Gnafoua	France	7.22	Q
6	2	Lisa Mayer	Germany	7.23	Q
6	1	Alexandra Burghardt	Germany	7.23	q
8	2	Ewa Swoboda	Poland	7.26	q
9	2	Sarah Atcho	Switzerland	7.32	PB
10	2	Gloria Hooper	Italy	7.34	SB
10	3	Stella Akakpo	France	7.34	
12	1	Krystsina Tsimanouskaya	Belarus	7.39	
13	1	Ajla del Ponte	Switzerland	7.39	
14	2	Phil Healy	Ireland	7.40	
14	3	Cristina Lara	Spain	7.40	
16	3	Anniina Kortetmaa	Finland	7.41	
17	2	Elin Östlund	Sweden	7.42	
17	3	Inna Eftimova	Bulgaria	7.42	
19	1	Klára Seidlová	Czech Republic	7.43	
19	3	Anna Bongiorni	Italy	7.43	
21	3	Helene Rønningen	Norway	7.45	
22	1	Agata Forkasiewicz	Poland	7.46	
23	1	Ciara Neville	Ireland	7.49	
24	2	Lorène Bazolo	Portugal	7.51	

=== Final ===
Rank	Heat	Athlete	Nationality	Time	Note
1st place, gold medalist(s)	6	Asha Philip	Great Britain	7.06	EL, NR
2nd place, silver medalist(s)	1	Ewa Swoboda	Poland	7.10	SB
3rd place, bronze medalist(s)	4	Mujinga Kambundji	Switzerland	7.16	SB
4	8	Lisa Mayer	Germany	7.19	
5	2	Alexandra Burghardt	Germany	7.19	
6	7	Floriane Gnafoua	France	7.20	PB
7	5	Rebekka Haase	Germany	7.21	
DSQ	3	Olesya Povh	Ukraine	~~7.10~~	~~PB~~
