= 2015 World Championships in Athletics – Women's 4 × 100 metres relay =

Women's 4 × 100 metres relay at the 2015 World Championships
- Venue: Beijing National Stadium
- Dates: 29 August (heats & final)
- Competitors: 68 from 16 nations
- Winning time: 41.07

Medalists
gold medal	Veronica Campbell-Brown; Natasha Morrison; Elaine Thompson; Shelly-Ann Fraser-Pryce; Sherone Simpson*; Kerron Stewart*	Jamaica
silver medal	English Gardner; Allyson Felix; Jenna Prandini; Jasmine Todd	United States
bronze medal	Kelly-Ann Baptiste; Michelle-Lee Ahye; Reyare Thomas; Semoy Hackett; Khalifa St. Fort*	Trinidad and Tobago

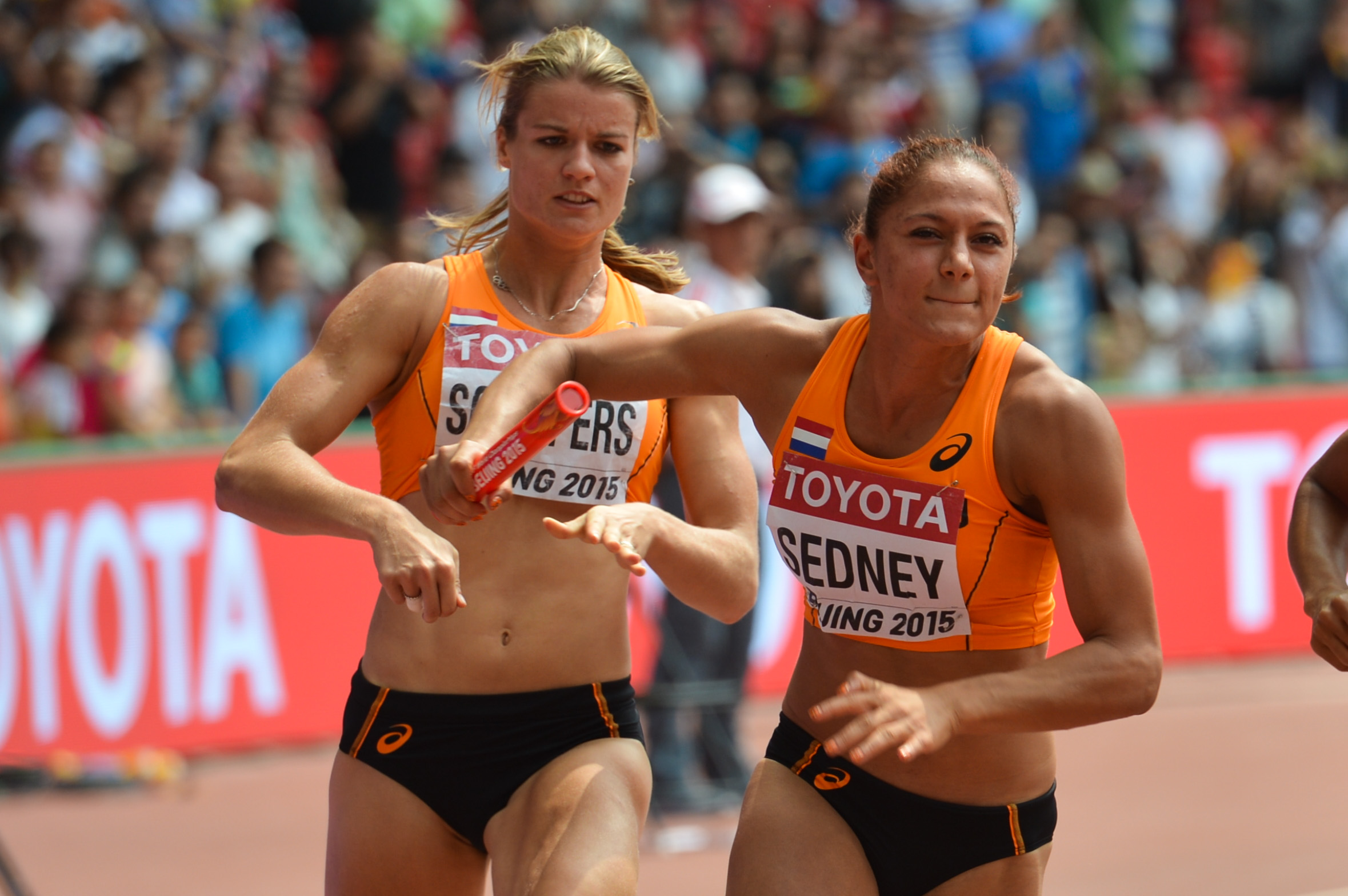
Naomi Sedney and Dafne Schippers during the heats of the 4 x 100 m relay at the 2015 World Championships, Beijing.

The women's 4 × 100 metres relay at the 2015 World Championships in Athletics was held at the Beijing National Stadium on 29 August.

== Summary ==
It is a rare chance for all the best athletes in a country to get together to run a relay, it takes a major championship. In the heats, Canada, the Netherlands and Trinidad and Tobago set National Records to get to the finals, T&T did so while resting anchor runner Semoy Hackett for the finals. Jamaica rested two, Veronica Campbell-Brown and Elaine Thompson, but not their superstar Shelly-Ann Fraser-Pryce, in order to make six girls eligible for medals. Jamaica was the number one qualifier. USA ran their A team, to assure qualification but not resting their workhorse Allyson Felix even though Tori Bowie, Dezerea Bryant and Kaylin Whitney had been listed as their entries, unlisted Jasmine Todd anchored.

In the finals Jamaica was out early with Campbell-Brown and a quick handoff to Natasha Morrison. Kseniya Ryzhova left too early and Russia never made a handoff, while USA looked to proportionally hold their own against the stagger through the backstretch with Felix. Trinidad and Tobago was also in position, while Dafne Schippers ran past Canada's Kimberly Hyacinthe on the outside. Jamaica continued to build their lead with Elaine Thompson through the tour, handing off smoothly to Shelly-Ann Fraser-Pryce in first place, who further extended their lead. USA was a clear second and Trinidad and Tobago clearly third, each with enough separation that places would not change to the finish. Behind them, the Netherlands was just slightly ahead of the British and German teams. Desiree Henry ran away from the others and was closing on Hackett, while the Dutch team's illegal handover earned them a disqualification.

The Jamaican team set a new National Record and the Championship Record, Trinidad and Tobago improved theirs from earlier in the day and the British team set their National Record. In all, five teams set their National Record.

== Records ==
Prior to the competition, the records were as follows:

World record	United States (Tianna Madison, Allyson Felix, Bianca Knight, Carmelita Jeter)	40.82	London, United Kingdom	10 August 2012
Championship record	Jamaica (Carrie Russell, Kerron Stewart, Schillonie Calvert, Shelly-Ann Fraser-Pryce)	41.29	Moscow, Russia	18 August 2013
World Leading	United States (English Gardner, Allyson Felix, Jenna Prandini, Kaylin Whitney)	41.96	Fontvieille, Monaco	17 July 2015
African Record	Nigeria (Beatrice Utondu, Faith Idehen, Christy Opara-Thompson, Mary Onyali-Omagbemi)	42.39	Barcelona, Spain	7 August 1992
Asian Record	China (Xiao Lin, Li Yali, Liu Xiaomei, Li Xuemei)	42.23	Shanghai, China	23 October 1997
North, Central American and Caribbean record	United States (Tianna Madison, Allyson Felix, Bianca Knight, Carmelita Jeter)	40.82	London, United Kingdom	10 August 2012
South American Record	Brazil (Evelyn dos Santos, Ana Cláudia Lemos, Franciela Krasucki, Rosângela Santos)	42.29	Moscow, Russia	18 August 2013
European Record	East Germany (Silke Gladisch-Möller, Sabine Rieger, Ingrid Auerswald-Lange, Marlies Göhr)	41.37	Canberra, Australia	6 October 1985
Oceanian record	Australia (Rachael Massey, Suzanne Broadrick, Jodi Lambert, Melinda Gainsford-Taylor)	42.99	Pietersburg, South Africa	18 March 2000
The following records were established during the competition:
World Leading	Jamaica (Sherone Simpson, Natasha Morrison, Kerron Stewart, Shelly-Ann Fraser-Pryce)	41.84	Beijing, China	29 August 2015
Championship record	Jamaica (Veronica Campbell-Brown, Natasha Morrison, Elaine Thompson, Shelly-Ann Fraser-Pryce)	41.07	Beijing, China	29 August 2015
World Leading	Jamaica (Veronica Campbell-Brown, Natasha Morrison, Elaine Thompson, Shelly-Ann Fraser-Pryce)	41.07	Beijing, China	29 August 2015

== Qualification standards ==
Entry standards
Top 8 at IWR+ 8 from Top Lists

== Schedule ==
Date	Time	Round
29 August 2015	12:00	Heats
29 August 2015	20:50	Final

All times are local times (UTC+8)

== Results ==
=== Heats ===
Qualification: First 3 of each heat (Q) plus the 2 fastest times (q) advance to the final.

Rank	Heat	Lane	Nation	Athletes	Time	Notes
1	1	6	Jamaica	Sherone Simpson, Natasha Morrison, Kerron Stewart, Shelly-Ann Fraser-Pryce	41.84	Q, WL
2	2	8	United States	English Gardner, Allyson Felix, Jenna Prandini, Jasmine Todd	42.00	Q
3	2	7	Trinidad and Tobago	Kelly-Ann Baptiste, Michelle-Lee Ahye, Reyare Thomas, Khalifa St. Fort	42.24	Q, NR
4	2	9	Netherlands	Nadine Visser, Dafne Schippers, Naomi Sedney, Jamile Samuel	42.32	Q, NR
5	1	5	Great Britain & N.I.	Asha Philip, Jodie Williams, Bianca Williams, Desiree Henry	42.48	Q, SB
6	1	8	Canada	Crystal Emmanuel, Kimberly Hyacinthe, Isatu Fofanah, Khamica Bingham	42.60	Q, NR
7	2	6	Germany	Rebekka Haase, Alexandra Burghardt, Gina Lückenkemper, Verena Sailer	42.64	q, SB
8	1	7	Russia	Marina Panteleyeva, Kseniya Ryzhova, Yelizaveta Demirova, Ekaterina Smirnova	43.09	q
9	2	4	Brazil	Bruna Farias, Franciela Krasucki, Vitória Cristina Rosa, Rosângela Santos	43.15	
10	1	3	China	Liang Xiaojing, Kong Lingwei, Lin Huijun, Wei Yongli	43.18	
11	1	9	Poland	Agata Forkasiewicz, Anna Kiełbasińska, Weronika Wedler, Marta Jeschke	43.20	SB
12	1	4	Italy	Giulia Riva, Irene Siragusa, Anna Bongiorni, Gloria Hooper	43.22	SB
13	2	5	Switzerland	Marisa Lavanchy, Léa Sprunger, Mujinga Kambundji, Sarah Atcho	43.38	
14	2	2	France	Lénora Guion-Firmin, Stella Akakpo, Maroussia Paré, Céline Distel-Bonnet	43.58	SB
15	2	3	Ukraine	Olesya Povh, Nataliya Strohova, Hrystyna Stuy, Nataliya Pyhyda	43.59	
16	1	2	Nigeria	Gloria Asumnu, Stephanie Kalu, Deborah Oluwaseun Odeyemi, Cecilia Francis	43.89	

=== Final ===
The final was held at 20:45.

Rank	Lane	Nation	Athletes	Time	Notes
1st place, gold medalist(s)	6	Jamaica	Veronica Campbell-Brown, Natasha Morrison, Elaine Thompson, Shelly-Ann Fraser-Pryce	41.07	CR, WL, NR
2nd place, silver medalist(s)	5	United States	English Gardner, Allyson Felix, Jenna Prandini, Jasmine Todd	41.68	SB
3rd place, bronze medalist(s)	4	Trinidad and Tobago	Kelly-Ann Baptiste, Michelle-Lee Ahye, Reyare Thomas, Semoy Hackett	42.03	NR
4	7	Great Britain & N.I.	Asha Philip, Dina Asher-Smith, Jodie Williams, Desiree Henry	42.10	NR
5	3	Germany	Rebekka Haase, Alexandra Burghardt, Gina Lückenkemper, Verena Sailer	42.64	SB
6	9	Canada	Crystal Emmanuel, Kimberly Hyacinthe, Isatu Fofanah, Khamica Bingham	43.05	
	2	Russia	Marina Panteleyeva, Kseniya Ryzhova, Yelizaveta Demirova, Anna Kukushkina	DNF	
	8	Netherlands	Nadine Visser, Dafne Schippers, Naomi Sedney, Jamile Samuel	DQ	R170.7
