= Floriane Gnafoua =

French sprinter

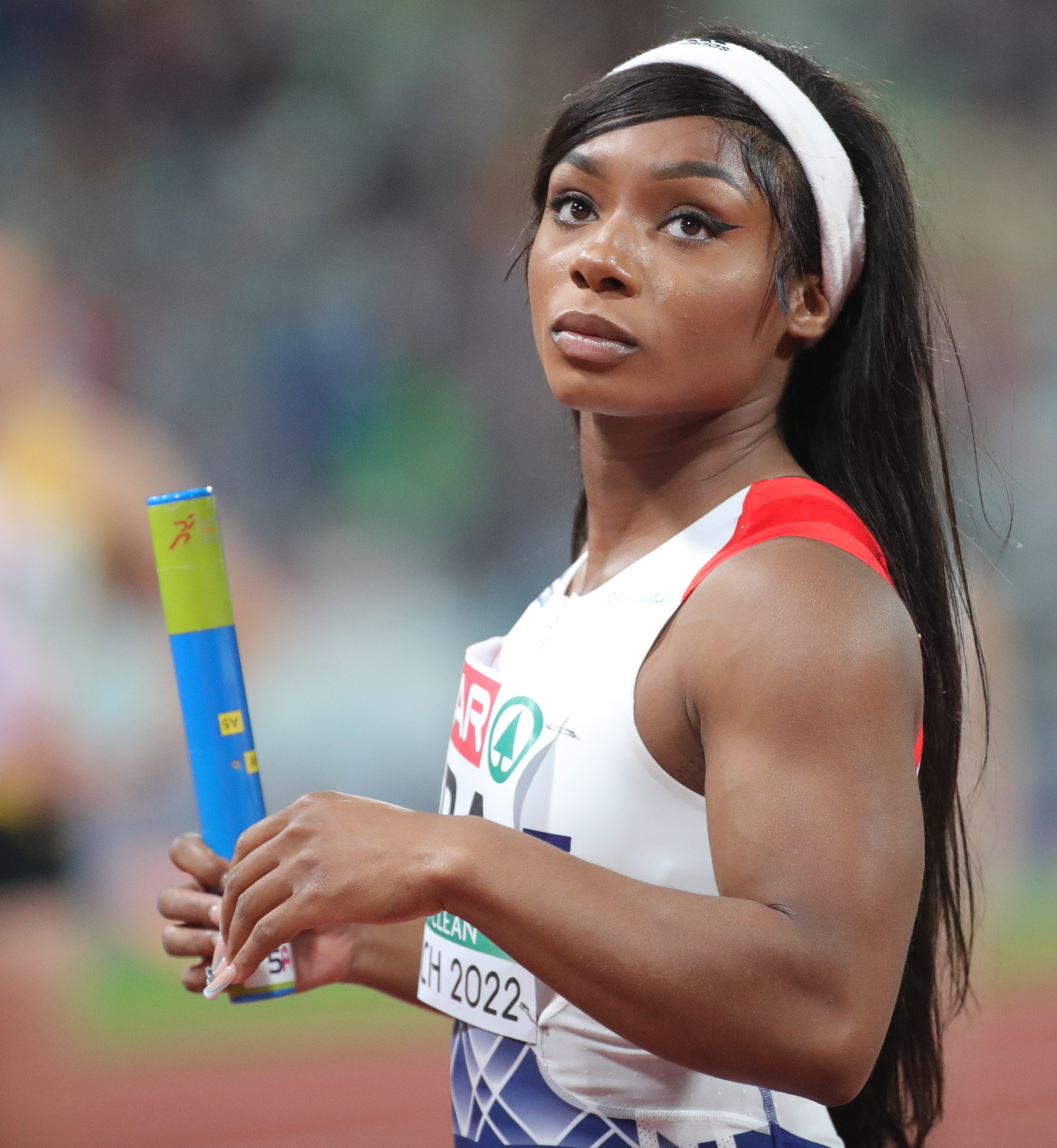
- Gnafoua in 2022

Personal information
- Born: 30 January 1996 (age 30) Saint-Cloud, France
- Height: 1.58 m (5 ft 2 in)
- Weight: 60 kg (132 lb)

Sport
- Country: France
- Sport: Athletics
- Event: 100 metres

Floriane Gnafoua (born 30 January 1996) is a French sprinter. She competed in the 100 metres at the 2016 European Athletics Championships finishing seventh.

== International competitions ==
Year	Competition	Venue	Position	Event	Notes
Representing France
2014	World Junior Championships	Eugene, United States	15th (sf)	100 m	11.88
2014	World Junior Championships	Eugene, United States	–	4 × 100 m relay	DNF
2015	European Junior Championships	Eskilstuna, Sweden	3rd	4 × 100 m relay	45.35
2016	European Championships	Amsterdam, Netherlands	7th	100 m	11.36
2016	European Championships	Amsterdam, Netherlands	6th	4 × 100 m relay	43.05
2016	Olympic Games	Rio de Janeiro, Brazil	11th (h)	4 × 100 m relay	43.07
2017	European Indoor Championships	Belgrade, Serbia	7th	60 m	7.20
2017	IAAF World Relays	Nassau, Bahamas	5th	4 × 100 m relay	43.90
2017	European U23 Championships	Bydgoszcz, Poland	3rd (sf)	100 m	11.44^{1}
2022	European Championships	Munich, Germany	3rd (h)	4 × 100 m relay	43.24^{1}

^{1}Did not finish in the final

== Personal bests ==
Outdoor

- 100 metres – 11.19 (+0.9 m/s, Angers 2016)

Indoor

- 60 metres – 7.20 (Belgrade 2017)
