= Tessa van Schagen =

Dutch sprinter (born 1994)

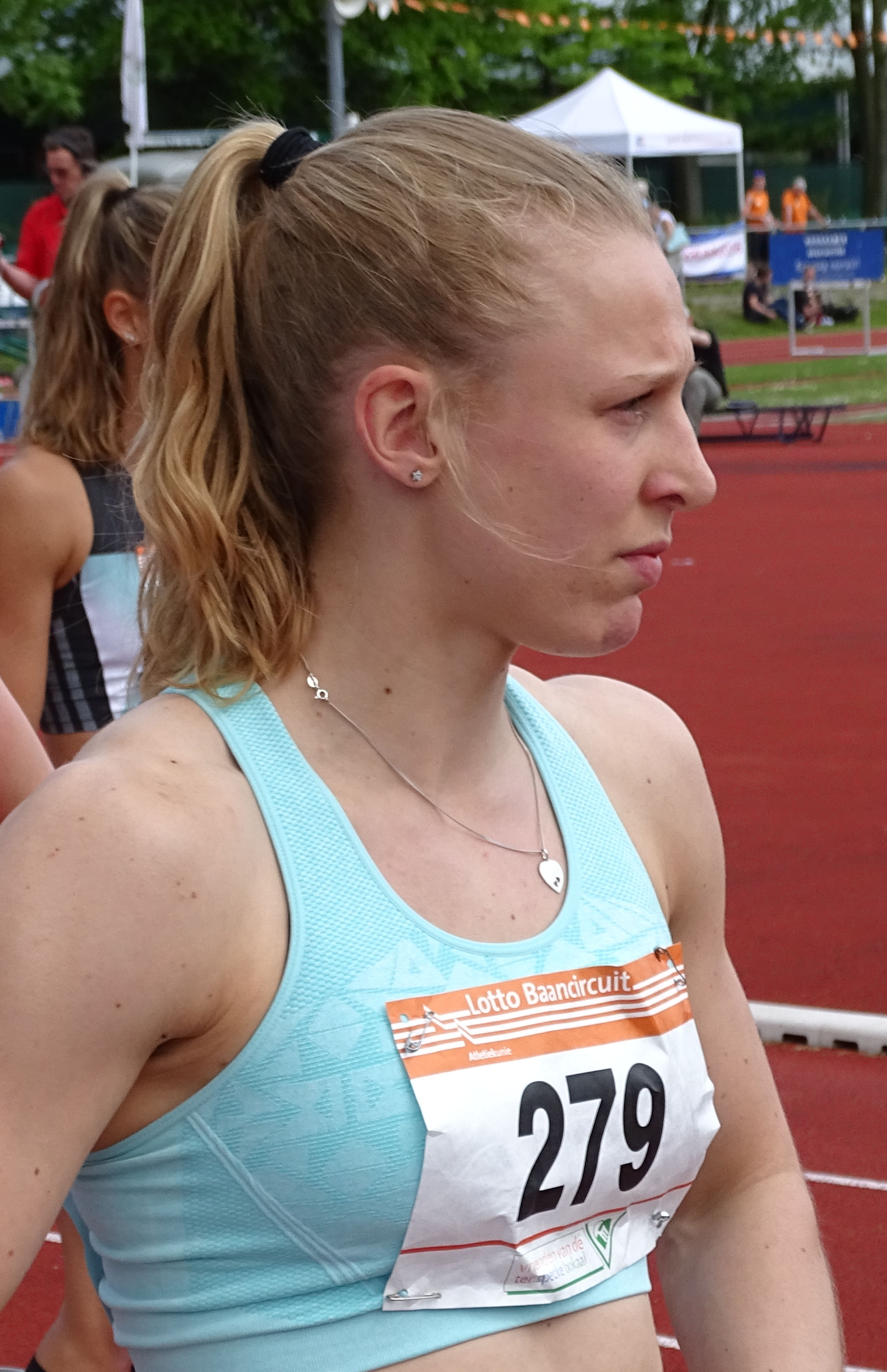
- Tessa van Schagen in 2016

Personal information
- Nationality: Dutch
- Born: 2 February 1994 (age 32) Leiden, Netherlands
- Height: 1.68 m (5 ft 6 in)
- Weight: 64 kg (141 lb)

Sport
- Country: Netherlands
- Sport: Track and field
- Event: Sprint
- Club: Leiden Atletiek
- Coached by: Martijn de Lange
Medal record
Women's athletics
Representing the Netherlands
European Championships
| Gold medal – first place | 2016 Amsterdam | 4 × 100 m relay |

Tessa Johanna van Schagen (born 2 February 1994) is a Dutch athlete who specialises in sprinting. She competed in the 4 × 100 m event at the 2016 European Championships in Amsterdam, Netherlands, where she won the gold medal.

== International competitions ==
| Year | Competition | Venue | Position | Event | Notes |
Representing the Netherlands
| 2011 | European Youth Olympic Festival | Trabzon, Turkey | 7th | 100 m | 12.13 |
| 2011 | European Youth Olympic Festival | Trabzon, Turkey | 1st | 4 × 100 m relay | 45.93 |
| 2012 | World Junior Championships | Barcelona, Spain | 6th | 4 × 100 m relay | 45.22 |
| 2013 | European Junior Championships | Rieti, Italy | 3rd | 200 m | 23.65 |
| 2013 | European Junior Championships | Rieti, Italy | 3rd | 4 × 100 m relay | 44.22 |
| 2014 | European Championships | Zürich, Switzerland | 3rd (h) | 4 × 100 m relay | 42.77^{1} |
| 2015 | European U23 Championships | Tallinn, Estonia | 4th | 200 m | 23.59 |
| 2015 | European U23 Championships | Tallinn, Estonia | 4th | 4 × 100 m relay | 44.46 |
| 2016 | European Championships | Amsterdam, Netherlands | 7th | 200 m | 23.03 |
| 2016 | European Championships | Amsterdam, Netherlands | 1st | 4 × 100 m relay | 42.04 |
| 2016 | Olympic Games | Rio de Janeiro, Brazil | 50th (h) | 200 m | 23.41 |
| 2017 | World Championships | London, United Kingdom | 8th | 4 × 100 m relay | 43.07 |

^{1}Did not finish in the final

== Personal bests ==
=== Outdoor ===
| Event | Record | Wind | Venue | Date |
|---|---|---|---|---|
| 100 metres | 11.65 s | -0.6 | Zürich | 28 August 2014 |
| 200 metres | 22.86 s | +0.4 | Amsterdam | 19 June 2016 |

=== Indoor ===
| Event | Record | Venue | Date |
|---|---|---|---|
| 200 metres | 23.52 s | Apeldoorn | 22 February 2015 |
