= Rebekka Haase =

German sprinter (born 1993)

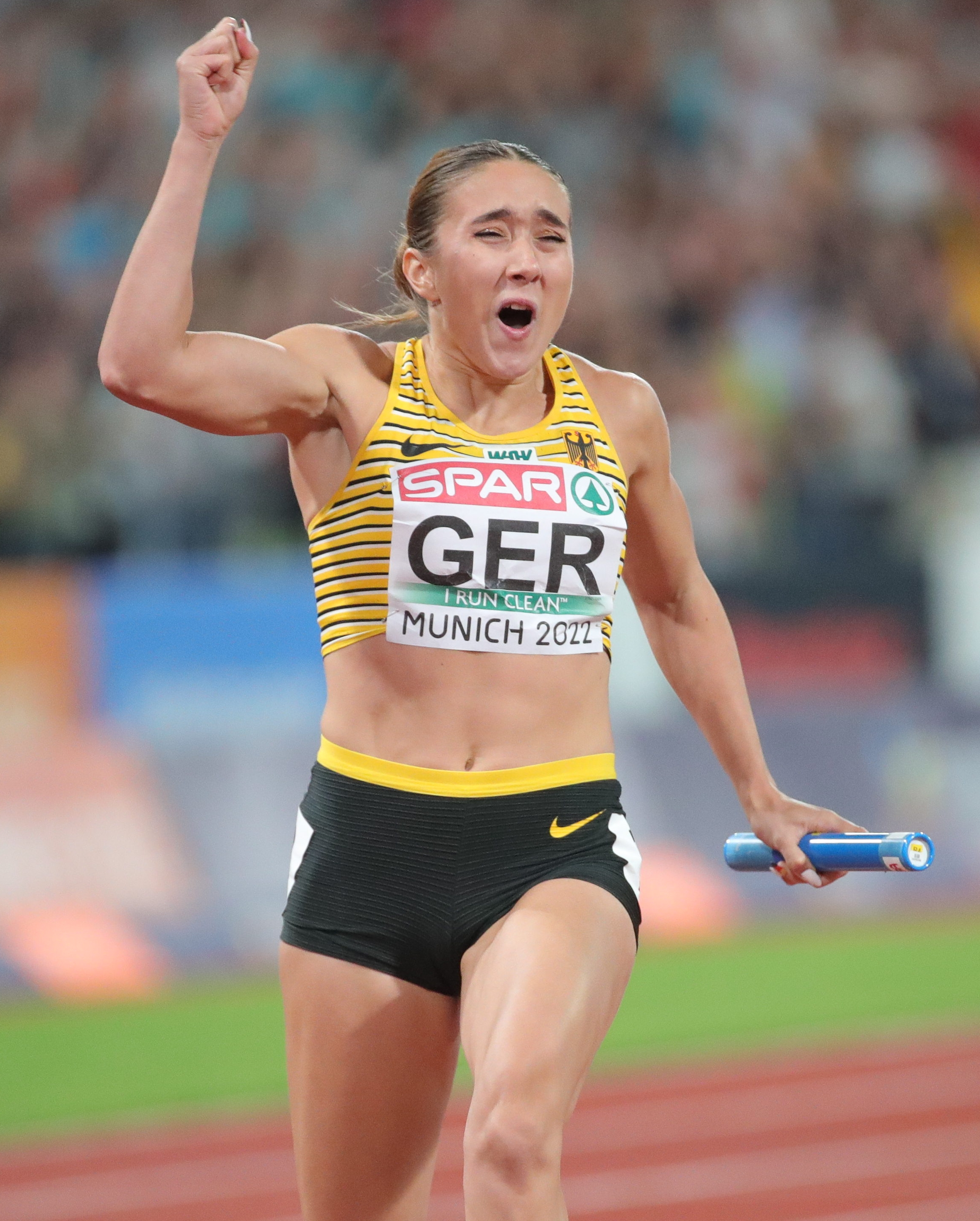
- Haase in 2022

Personal information
- Born: 2 January 1993 (age 33) Zschopau, Germany
- Height: 1.70 m (5 ft 7 in)
- Weight: 57 kg (126 lb)

Sport
- Sport: Track and field
- Events: 100 metres, 200 metres
- Club: Sprintteam Wetzlar
- Coached by: Jörg Möckel
Medal record
Women's athletics
Representing Germany
Olympic Games
Bronze medal – third place	2024 Paris	4 × 100 m relay
World Championships
Bronze medal – third place	2022 Eugene	4 × 100 m relay
Bronze medal – third place	2025 Tokyo	4 × 100 m relay
European Championships
Gold medal – first place	2022 Munich	4 × 100 m relay
Silver medal – second place	2026 Birmingham	4 × 100 m mixed
Bronze medal – third place	2018 Berlin	4 × 100 m relay
Bronze medal – third place	2016 Amsterdam	4 × 100 m relay

Rebekka Haase (born 2 January 1993) is a German athlete specialising in the sprinting events. She won three gold medals at the 2015 European U23 Championships, a gold medal at the 2017 IAAF World Relays, and became European Champion with the German 4 × 100 metres relay team in 2022.

== Competition record ==
Year	Competition	Venue	Position	Event	Notes
Representing Germany
2010	Youth Olympic Games	Singapore	8th	100 m	12.08
2011	European Junior Championships	Tallinn, Estonia	12th (sf)	100 m	12.04
2013	European U23 Championships	Tampere, Finland	14th (sf)	100 m	11.98
2014	European Championships	Zürich, Switzerland	18th (sf)	100 m	11.52
2014	European Championships	Zürich, Switzerland	–	4 × 100 m relay	DNF
2015	European Indoor Championships	Prague, Czech Republic	11th (h)	60 m	7.25
2015	World Relays	Nassau, Bahamas	3rd	4 × 200 m relay	1:33.61
2015	European U23 Championships	Tallinn, Estonia	1st	100 m	11.47
2015	European U23 Championships	Tallinn, Estonia	1st	200 m	23.16
2015	European U23 Championships	Tallinn, Estonia	1st	4 × 100 m relay	43.47
2015	World Championships	Beijing, China	23rd (h)	100 m	11.29
2015	World Championships	Beijing, China	5th	4 × 100 m relay	42.64
2016	European Championships	Amsterdam, Netherlands	12th (sf)	100 m	11.46
2016	European Championships	Amsterdam, Netherlands	3rd	4 × 100 m relay	42.48
2016	Olympic Games	Rio de Janeiro, Brazil	32nd (h)	100 m	11.47
2016	Olympic Games	Rio de Janeiro, Brazil	4th	4 × 100 m relay	42.10
2017	European Indoor Championships	Belgrade, Serbia	8th	60 m	7.21
2017	World Relays	Nassau, Bahamas	1st	4 × 100 m relay	42.84
2017	World Relays	Nassau, Bahamas	2nd	4 × 200 m relay	1:30.68
2017	World Championships	London, United Kingdom	12th (sf)	200 m	23.03
2017	World Championships	London, United Kingdom	4th	4 × 100 m relay	42.36
2018	European Championships	Berlin, Germany	17th (sf)	200 m	23.42
2018	European Championships	Berlin, Germany	3rd	4 × 100 m relay	42.23
2019	European Indoor Championships	Glasgow, United Kingdom	17th (sf)	60 m	7.37
2019	World Relays	Yokohama, Japan	3rd	4 × 100 m relay	43.68
2021	Olympic Games	Tokyo, Japan	5th	4 × 100 m relay	42.12
2022	World Championships	Eugene, United States	3rd	4 × 100 m relay	42.03
2022	European Championships	Munich, Germany	18th (sf)	100 m	11.52
2022	European Championships	Munich, Germany	1st	4 × 100 m relay	42.34
2023	World Championships	Budapest, Hungary	36th (h)	100 m	11.43
2023	World Championships	Budapest, Hungary	6th	4 × 100 m relay	42.98
2024	European Championships	Rome, Italy	19th (sf)	100 m	11.35
2024	European Championships	Rome, Italy	4th	4 × 100 m relay	42.61
2024	Olympic Games	Paris, France	32nd (h)	100 m	11.28
2024	Olympic Games	Paris, France	3rd	4 × 100 m relay	41.97
2025	World Championships	Tokyo, Japan	3rd	4 × 100 m relay	41.87
2026	European Championships	Birmingham, United Kingdom	21st (sf)	100 m	11.36
2026	European Championships	Birmingham, United Kingdom	–	4 × 100 m relay	DNF

Abbreviations: h = heat (Q, q), sf = semi-final

== Personal bests ==
Outdoor

- 100 metres – 11.06 (+1.8 m/s) (Zeulenroda 25 May 2017)
- 200 metres – 22.76 (+1.1 m/s) (Stockholm 18 June 2017)

Indoor

- 60 metres – 7.14 (Erfurt 27 January 2017)
- 200 metres – 22.77 (Leipzig 19 February 2017)
- 300 metres – 36.92 (Erfurt 27 January 2017)
