= Stella Akakpo =

French sprinter

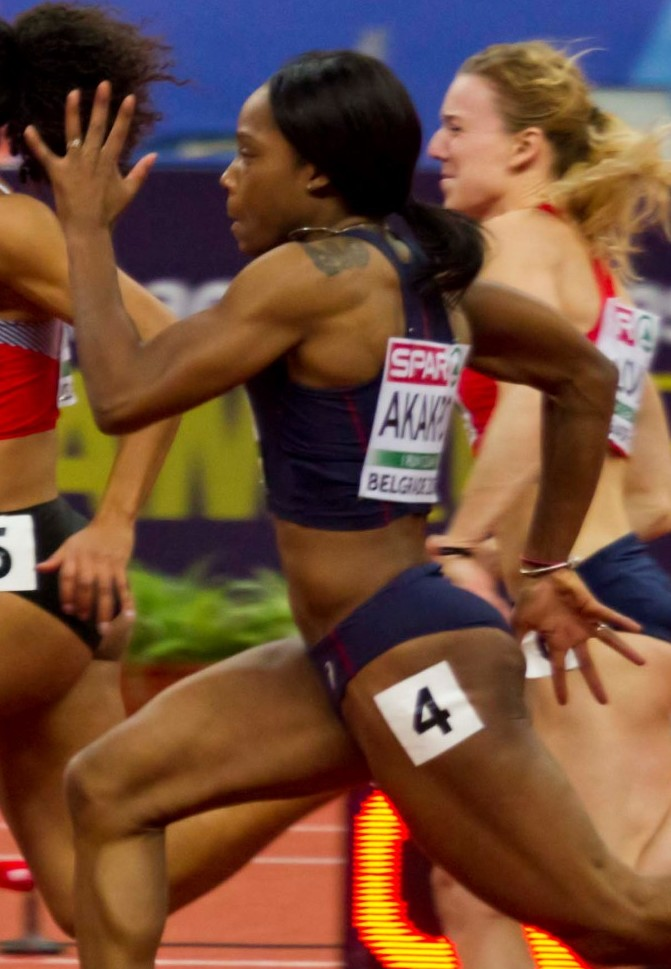
- Akakpo in 2017

Personal information
- Born: 28 February 1994 (age 32) Villepinte, France
- Height: 1.66 m (5 ft 5 in)
- Weight: 60 kg (132 lb)

Sport
- Country: France
- Sport: Athletics (track and field)
- Events: 100 metres, 200 metres
- Club: Amiens UC
- Coached by: Olivier Vallaeys

Stella Akakpo (born 28 February 1994 in Villepinte) is a French athlete specialising in the sprinting events. She won the silver medal in the 4 × 100 metres relay at the 2014 European Championships. In addition, she represented her country at the 2013 World Championships.

== Personal life ==
Akakpo was born in France and is of Togolese descent.

== Competition record ==
Year	Competition	Venue	Position	Event	Notes
Representing France
2011	World Youth Championships	Lille, France	18th (sf)	100 m	12.40
2013	European Junior Championships	Rieti, Italy	1st	100 m	11.52
2013	European Junior Championships	Rieti, Italy	2nd	4 × 100 m relay	44.00
2013	World Championships	Moscow, Russia	25th (h)	100 m	11.43
2013	World Championships	Moscow, Russia	3rd (h)	4 × 100 m relay	42.25 (Note: Disqualified in the final)
2014	IAAF World Relays	Nassau, Bahamas	8th	4 × 100 m relay	43.76
2014	European Championships	Zürich, Switzerland	2nd	4 × 100 m relay	42.45
2015	IAAF World Relays	Nassau, Bahamas	–	4 × 100 m relay	DNF
2015	European U23 Championships	Tallinn, Estonia	3rd	100 m	11.55
2015	World Championships	Beijing, China	14th (h)	4 × 100 m relay	43.58
2016	European Championships	Amsterdam, Netherlands	–	100 m	DQ
2016	European Championships	Amsterdam, Netherlands	6th	4 × 100 m relay	43.05
2016	Olympic Games	Rio de Janeiro, Brazil	11th (h)	4 × 100 m relay	43.07
2017	European Indoor Championships	Belgrade, Serbia	10th (sf)	60 m	7.34
2017	IAAF World Relays	Nassau, Bahamas	5th	4 × 100 m relay	43.90
2018	Mediterranean Games	Tarragona, Spain	5th	100 m	11.61
2018	European Championships	Berlin, Germany	5th	4 × 100 m relay	43.10
2019	Universiade	Naples, Italy	13th (sf)	100 m	11.72

== Personal bests ==
Outdoor

- 100 metres – 11.17 (-0.4 m/s) (Angers 2017)
- 200 metres – 23.54 (+1.0 m/s) (Walnut 2013)

Indoor

- 60 metres – 7.12 (Metz 2016)
- 200 metres – 23.27 (Aubière 2016)
