= Gina Lückenkemper =

German sprinter (born 1996)

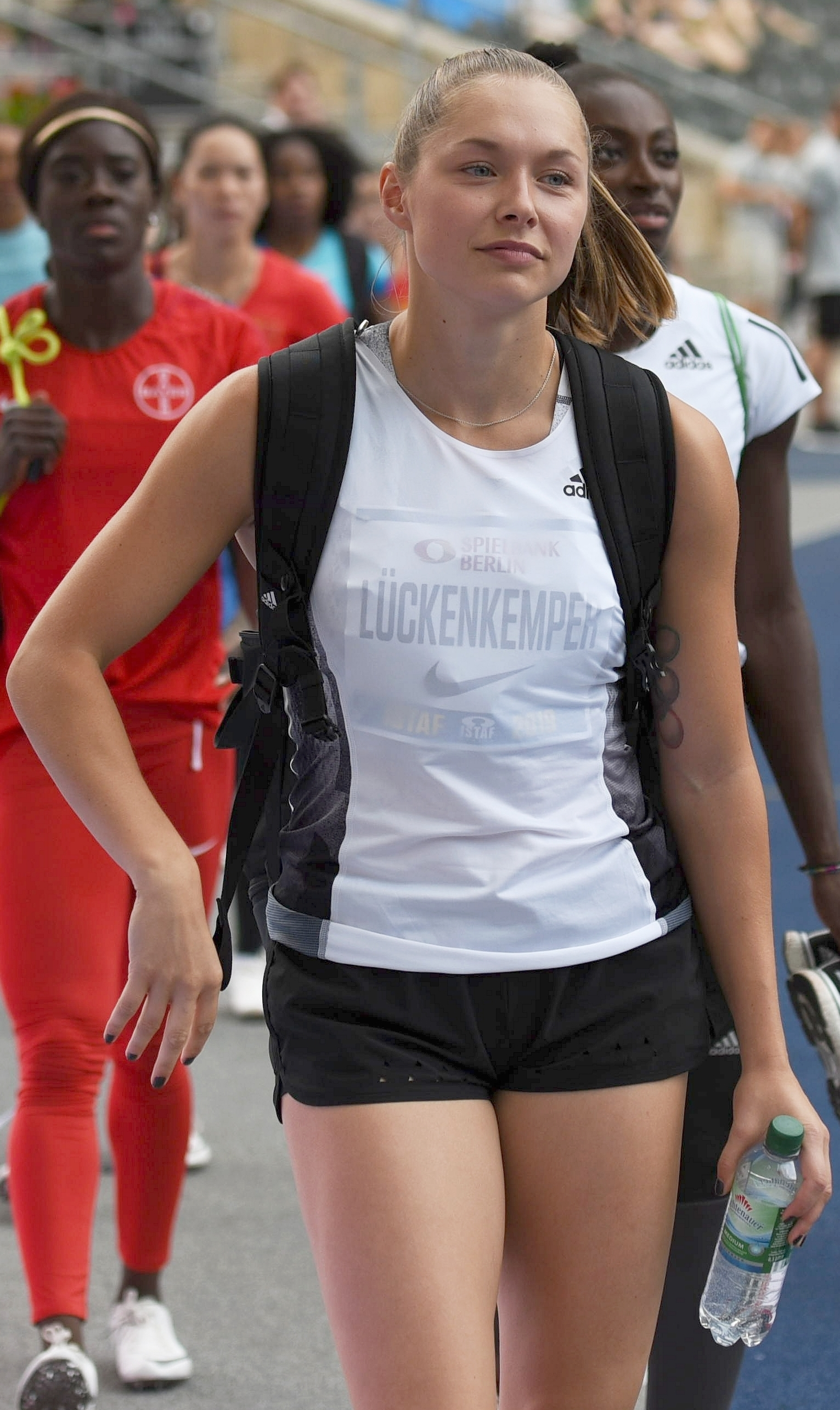
- Lückenkemper at the ISTAF Berlin meeting in 2019

Personal information
- Born: 21 November 1996 (age 29) Hamm, Germany
- Height: 1.68 m (5 ft 6 in)
- Weight: 55 kg (121 lb)

Sport
- Country: Germany
- Sport: Athletics
- Events: 100 m, 200 m
- Club: SCC Berlin
- Coached by: Lance Brauman
Medal record
Women's athletics
Representing Germany
Olympic Games
Bronze medal – third place	2024 Paris	4 × 100 m relay
World Championships
Bronze medal – third place	2022 Eugene	4 × 100 m relay
Bronze medal – third place	2025 Tokyo	4 × 100 m relay
World Relays
Silver medal – second place	2017 Nassau	4 × 200 m relay
Bronze medal – third place	2019 Yokohama	4 × 100 m relay
European Championships
Gold medal – first place	2022 Munich	100 m
Gold medal – first place	2022 Munich	4 × 100 m relay
Silver medal – second place	2018 Berlin	100 m
Silver medal – second place	2026 Birmingham	4 × 100 m mixed
Bronze medal – third place	2016 Amsterdam	200 m
Bronze medal – third place	2016 Amsterdam	4 × 100 m relay
Bronze medal – third place	2018 Berlin	4 × 100 m relay
World U20 Championships
Bronze medal – third place	2014 Eugene	4 × 100 m relay
European U20 Championships
Gold medal – first place	2015 Eskilstuna	200 m

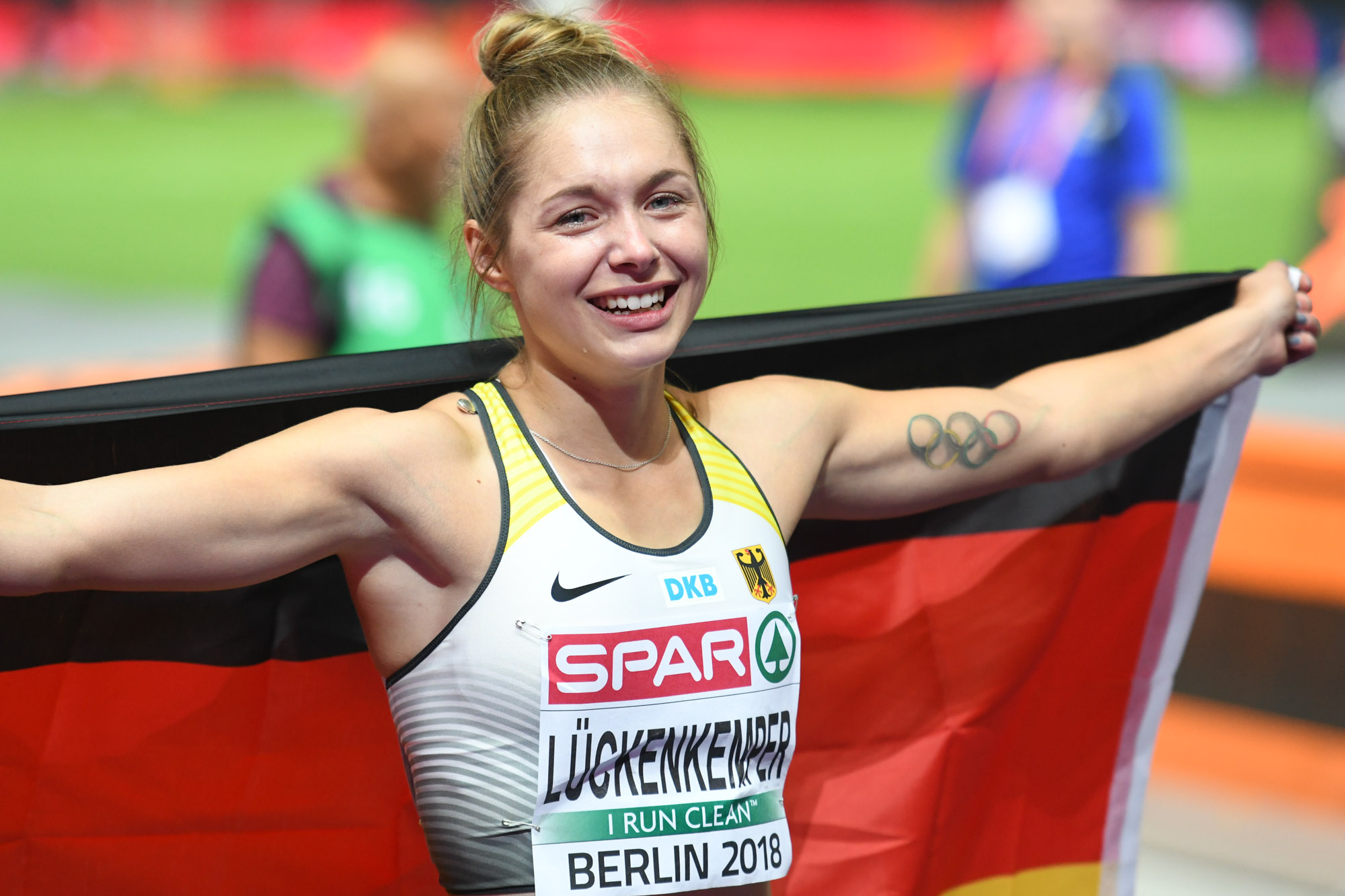
Lückenkemper at the 2018 European Championships in Berlin

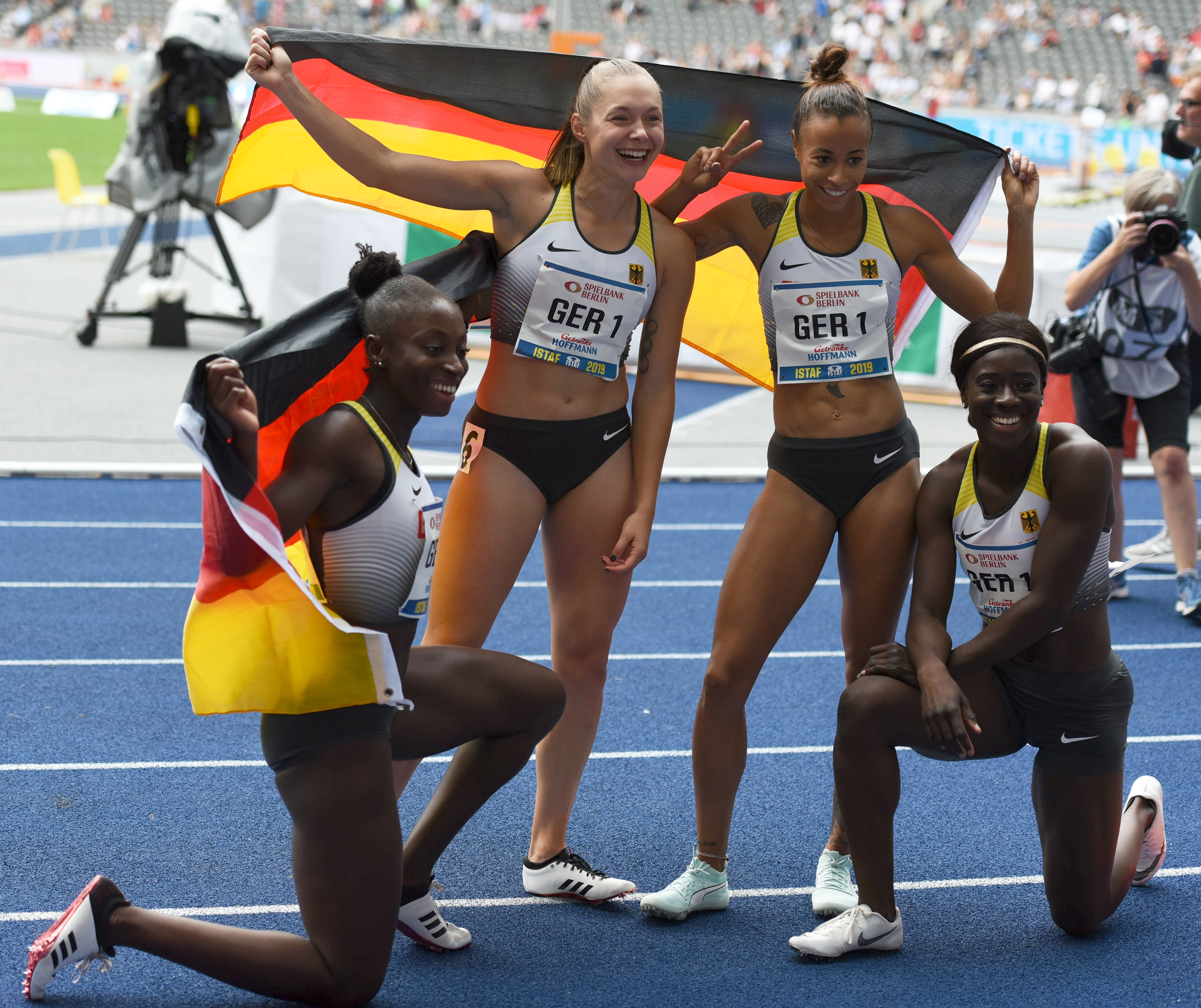
Lückenkemper (second from the left) with 4 × 100 m relay team at the ISTAF Berlin meet in 2019

Gina Lückenkemper (born 21 November 1996) is a German track and field athlete who competes in the sprints. She is a three-time Olympian and won a bronze medal in the 4 × 100 metres relay at the 2024 Summer Olympics. Lückenkemper is also a World Championships bronze medalist, two-time European champion and World Relays silver and bronze medalist.

She is a six-time German champion, having won the 100 metres five times and the 200 metres once. At junior level, she won the gold medal in the 200 metres at the 2015 European Junior Championships and the bronze medal in the 4 × 100 metres relay at the 2014 World Junior Championships.

At the 2017 World Championships in London, Lückenkemper broke the 11-second barrier in the heats of the 100 m event for the first time with a time of 10.95 seconds, becoming the first German female sprinter to achieve the feat since Katrin Krabbe in 1991.

For her 2022 season, she was voted German Sportswoman of the Year.

== Training environment & education ==
Lückenkemper started her studies in Business Psychology at the Ruhr-University Bochum alongside her athletic career.

In November 2019, she made a major change to her training environment by joining PURE Athletics, an elite training group in Clermont, Florida, under coach Lance Brauman. Leaving her domestic setup, she relocates frequently (not permanently though) to the US to train alongside a squad of international world-class sprinters, including 100m Olympic Champion Noah Lyles.

== Career ==
Lückenkemper won her first international medals when she placed third in the 4 × 100 metres relay at the 2014 World Junior Championships in Eugene and first in the 200 metres at the 2015 European Junior Championships in Eskilstuna. Lückenkemper made her senior international championships debut at the 2015 World Championships in Beijing, where she placed fifth in the 4 × 100 metres relay and 28th in the qualification heat for the 100 metres.

Lückenkemper won bronze medals in the 200 metres and the 4 × 100 metres relay at the 2016 European Championships in Amsterdam. She made her Olympic Games debut at the 2016 Summer Olympics in Rio de Janeiro, where she finished fourth in the 4 × 100 metres relay and 14th in the semifinals of the 200 metres. In 2017, she won a silver medal in the 4 × 200 metres relay at the World Relays, and placed fourth in the 4 × 100 metres relay and 14th in the semifinals of the 100 metres at the World Championships in London.

Lückenkemper won the silver medal in the 100 metres and a bronze medal in the 4 × 100 metres relay at the 2018 European Championships in Berlin. In 2019, she won a bronze medal in the 4 × 100 metres relay at the World Relays, and finished fifth in the 4 × 100 metres relay and 20th in the semifinals of the 100 metres at the World Championships in Doha. Lückenkemper competed at the 2020 Summer Olympics in Tokyo held in 2021, where she placed fifth in the 4 × 100 metres relay.

Lückenkemper won a bronze medal in the 4 × 100 metres relay at the 2022 World Championships in Eugene. She won gold medals in the 100 metres and the 4 × 100 m relay at the 2022 European Championships in Munich. In 2023, Lückenkemper placed sixth in the 4 × 100 metres relay and 16th in the semifinals of the 100 metres at the World Championships in Budapest. She finished 4th in the 4 × 100 metres relay and 5th in the 100 metres at the 2024 European Championships in Rome. Lückenkemper won a bronze medal in the 4 × 100 metres relay and placed 10th in the 100 metres at the 2024 Summer Olympics in Paris. In September 2024, she set a new personal best of 10.93s at the ISTAF Berlin.

At the 2025 World Athletics Championships in Tokyo, Lückenkemper reached the 100m semifinal and secured a bronze medal with the German 4 × 100 m relay team. Furthermore, she competed at the 2026 European Championships, where she was eliminated in the semifinals.

== Achievements ==
=== International competitions ===
Representing Germany
Year	Competition	Venue	Position	Event	Notes
2012	World Junior Championships	Barcelona, Spain	14th (sf)	200 m	23.99
2013	World Youth Championships	Donetsk, Ukraine	5th	200 m	23.53
2014	World Junior Championships	Eugene, OR, United States	8th	200 m	23.50 (w)
2014	World Junior Championships	Eugene, OR, United States	3rd	4 × 100 m relay	44.65
2015	European Junior Championships	Eskilstuna, Sweden	1st	200 m	22.41
2015	European Junior Championships	Eskilstuna, Sweden	– (f)	4 × 100 m relay	DNF
2015	World Championships	Beijing, China	28th (h)	100 m	11.34
2015	World Championships	Beijing, China	5th	4 × 100 m relay	42.64
2016	European Championships	Amsterdam, Netherlands	3rd	200 m	22.74
2016	European Championships	Amsterdam, Netherlands	3rd	4 × 100 m relay	42.48
2016	Olympic Games	Rio de Janeiro, Brazil	14th (sf)	200 m	22.73
2016	Olympic Games	Rio de Janeiro, Brazil	4th	4 × 100 m relay	42.10
2017	World Relays	Nassau, Bahamas	2nd	4 × 200 m relay	1:30.68
2017	European Team Championships Super League	Lille, France	2nd	100 m	11.35
2017	European Team Championships Super League	Lille, France	1st	4 × 100 m relay	42.47 CR
2017	World Championships	London, United Kingdom	14th (sf)	100 m	11.16
2017	World Championships	London, United Kingdom	4th	4 × 100 m relay	42.36
2018	European Championships	Berlin, Germany	2nd	100 m	10.98
2018	European Championships	Berlin, Germany	3rd	4 × 100 m relay	42.23
2019	World Relays	Yokohama, Japan	3rd	4 × 100 m relay	43.68
2019	World Championships	Doha, Qatar	20th (sf)	100 m	11.30
2019	World Championships	Doha, Qatar	5th	4 × 100 m relay	42.48
2021	Olympic Games	Tokyo, Japan	5th	4 × 100 m relay	42.12
2022	World Indoor Championships	Belgrade, Serbia	29th (h)	60 m	7.33
2022	World Championships	Eugene, OR, United States	13th (sf)	100 m	11.08
2022	World Championships	Eugene, OR, United States	3rd	4 × 100 m relay	42.03
2022	European Championships	Munich, Germany	1st	100 m	10.99
2022	European Championships	Munich, Germany	1st	4 × 100 m relay	42.34
2023	World Championships	Budapest, Hungary	16th (sf)	100 m	11.18
2023	World Championships	Budapest, Hungary	6th	4 × 100 m relay	42.98
2024	European Championships	Rome, Italy	5th	100 m	11.07
2024	European Championships	Rome, Italy	4th	4 × 100 m relay	42.61
2024	Olympic Games	Paris, France	10th	100 m	11.09
2024	Olympic Games	Paris, France	3rd	4 × 100 m relay	41.97
2025	World Championships	Tokyo, Japan	13th (sf)	100 m	11.11
2025	World Championships	Tokyo, Japan	3rd	4 × 100 m relay	41.87
2026	European Championships	Birmingham, United Kingdom	15th (sf)	100 m	11.28
2026	European Championships	Birmingham, United Kingdom	–	4 × 100 m relay	DNF

* Abbreviations: h = heat (Q, q), sf = semi-final

=== Circuit wins and National championships ===
- Diamond League
  - 2019: Zürich Weltklasse (4 × 100 m relay)
- German Athletics Championships titles
  - 100 metres: 2017, 2018, 2022, 2023, 2024
  - 200 metres: 2016
- German Indoor Athletics Championships titles
  - 60 metres: 2017
  - 4 × 200 m relay: 2017

=== Personal bests ===
- 60 metres indoor – 7.11 s (Dortmund 2018)
- 100 metres – 10.93 s (+1.0 m/s, Berlin September 1, 2024)
- 200 metres – 22.67 s (0.0 m/s, Regensburg 2016)
- 200 metres indoor – 23.69 s (Halle 2014)
