= Irene Siragusa =

Italian sprinter

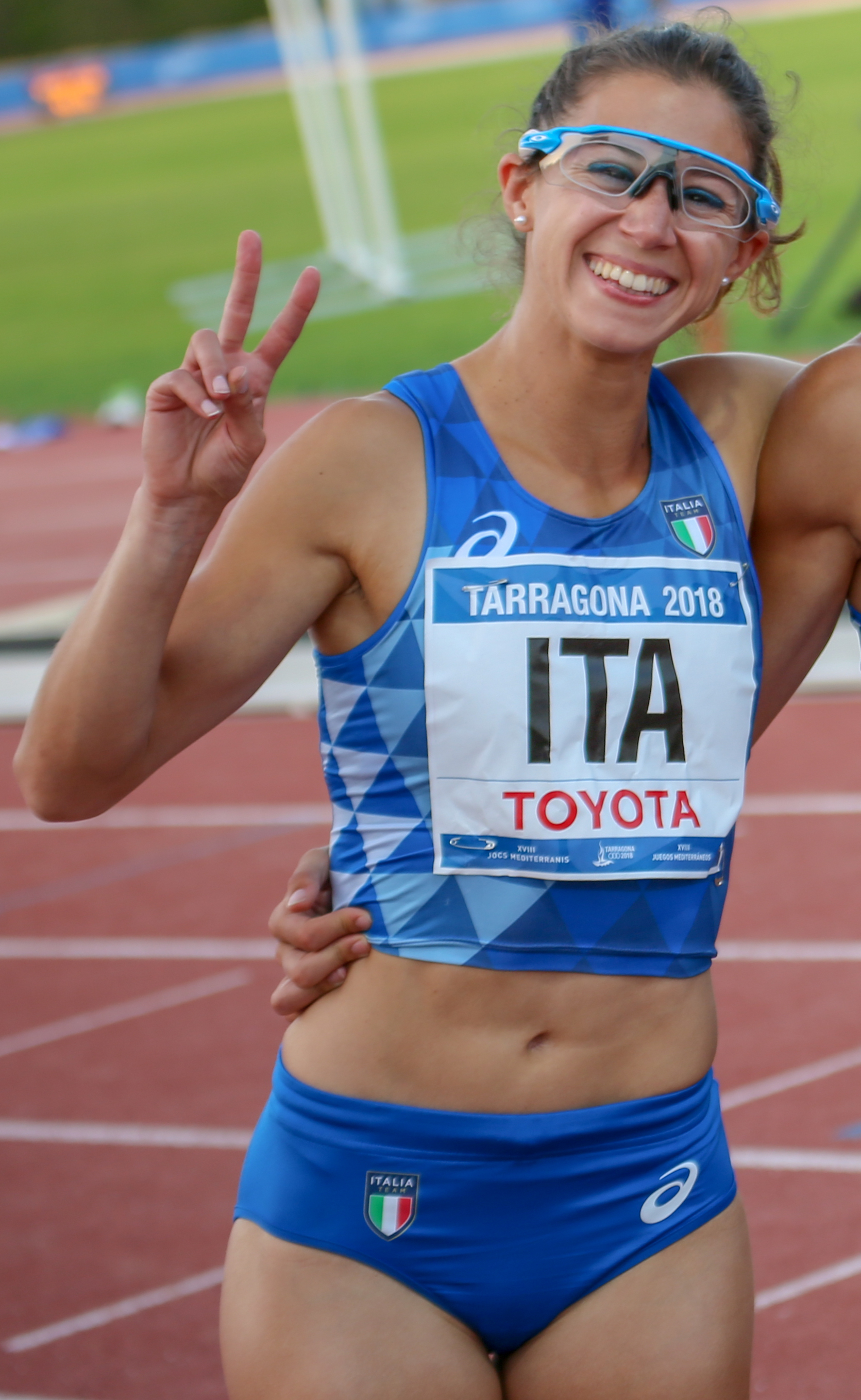
- Siragusa in 2018

Personal information
- Born: 23 June 1993 (age 33) Poggibonsi, Italy
- Education: Foreigners University of Siena
- Height: 1.61 m (5 ft 3 in)
- Weight: 49 kg (108 lb)

Sport
- Country: Italy
- Sport: Athletics
- Event: Sprinting
- Club: CS Esercito (Army)
- Coached by: Vanna Radi

Achievements and titles
- Personal bests: 100 m: 11.21 (2018); 200 m: 22.96 (2017)
Medal record
World Relays
Gold medal – first place	2021 Chorzów	4×100 m relay
Summer Universiade
Gold medal – first place	2017 Taipei	200 metres
Silver medal – second place	2017 Taipei	100 metres
European U23 Championships
Silver medal – second place	2011 Tallinn	4 × 100 metres relay
Bronze medal – third place	2013 Tampere	4 × 100 metres relay
European Junior Championships
Silver medal – second place	2011 Tallinn	4 × 100 metres relay

Irene Siragusa (born 23 June 1993) is an Italian sprinter, who participated at the 2015, 2017 and 2019 World Athletics Championships. She won two individual medals at the 2017 Summer Universiade. She competed at the 2020 Summer Olympics, in 4 × 100 m relay.

== Biography ==
She competed in the 4 × 100 metres relay at the 2015 World Championships in Athletics in Beijing and in 200 metres at the 2017 World Championships in Athletics in London. Before turning to athletics, she practiced artistic roller skating. She won five times (four outdoor and one indoor) the national championships at individual senior level.

== National records ==
- 4 × 100 m relay: 42.90 (Doha, Qatar, 4 October 2019), she ran final leg in the team with Johanelis Herrera, Gloria Hooper, Anna Bongiorni – current holder

== Personal bests ==
Outdoor

- 100 metres: 11.21 (+1.1 m/s; Orvieto, 17 June 2018)
- 200 metres: 22.96 (–1.4 m/s; Taipei, 26 August 2017)

Indoor

- 60 metres: 7.32 (Ancona, 18 February 2018)

== Achievements ==
Year	Competition	Venue	Position	Event	Time	Notes
2011	European Junior Championships	Tallinn, Estonia	9th (h)	200 m	24.01	
2011	European Junior Championships	Tallinn, Estonia	2nd	4 × 100 m relay	44.52	
2012	World Junior Championships	Barcelona, Spain	10th (sf)	200 m	23.75	
2012	World Junior Championships	Barcelona, Spain	9th (h)	4 × 100 m relay	45.15	
2013	European U23 Championships	Tampere, Finland	7th	100 m	11.78	
2013	European U23 Championships	Tampere, Finland	14th (sf)	200 m	24.08	
2013	European U23 Championships	Tampere, Finland	3rd	4 × 100 m relay	43.86	
2014	European Championships	Zürich, Switzerland	20th (sf)	100 m	11.53	
2014	European Championships	Zürich, Switzerland	20th (sf)	200 m	23.50	
2014	European Championships	Zürich, Switzerland	4th	4 × 100 m relay	43.26	
2015	World Relays	Nassau, Bahamas	–	4 × 100 m relay	DNF	
2015	European U23 Championships	Tallinn, Estonia	6th	100 m	11.75	
2015	European U23 Championships	Tallinn, Estonia	16th (h)	200 m	24.06	(w)
2015	European U23 Championships	Tallinn, Estonia	2nd	4 × 100 m relay	44.06	
2015	World Championships	Beijing, China	12th (h)	4 × 100 m relay	43.22	
2016	European Championships	Amsterdam, Netherlands	22nd (h)	100 m	11.78	
2016	European Championships	Amsterdam, Netherlands	22nd (h)	200 m	23.87	
2016	European Championships	Amsterdam, Netherlands	8th	4 × 100 m relay	43.57	
2017	World Championships	London, United Kingdom	34th (h)	200 m	23.73	
2017	Universiade	Taipei, Taiwan	2nd	100 m	11.31	PB
2017	Universiade	Taipei, Taiwan	1st	200 m	22.96	PB
2018	Mediterranean Games	Tarragona, Spain	4th	200 m	23.11	
2018	Mediterranean Games	Tarragona, Spain	3rd	4 × 100 m relay	43.63	
2018	European Championships	Berlin, Germany	23rd (sf)	100 m	11.60	
2018	European Championships	Berlin, Germany	15th (sf)	200 m	23.30	
2018	European Championships	Berlin, Germany	7th	4 × 100 m relay	43.42	
2019	World Relays	Yokohama, Japan	5th	4 × 100 m relay	44.29	
2019	World Championships	Doha, Qatar	7th	4 × 100 m relay	42.98	
2019	Military World Games	Wuhan, China	6th	200 m	23.76	
2019	Military World Games	Wuhan, China	6th	4 × 100 m relay	44.95	
2021	European Indoor Championships	Toruń, Poland	21st (h)	60 m	7.37	
2021	World Relays	Chorzów, Poland	1st	4 × 100 m relay	43.79	
2021	Olympic Games	Tokyo, Japan	9th (h)	4 × 100 m relay	42.84	
2022	Mediterranean Games	Oran, Algeria	4th	200 m	23.27	
2022	Mediterranean Games	Oran, Algeria	1st	4 × 100 m relay	43.68	
2022	European Championships	Munich, Germany	22nd (sf)	100 m	11.56	
2022	European Championships	Munich, Germany	16th (sf)	200 m	23.46	
2023	European Indoor Championships	Istanbul, Turkey	23rd (sf)	60 m	7.39	
2024	European Championships	Rome, Italy	15th (sf)	200 m	23.17	
2024	European Championships	Rome, Italy	9th (h)	4 × 100 m relay	43.27	
2024	Olympic Games	Paris, France	13th (h)	4 × 100 m relay	43.03	

== National titles ==
- Italian Athletics Championships
  - 100 metres: 2014, 2017
  - 200 metres: 2014, 2018
- Italian Athletics Indoor Championships
  - 60 metres: 2020

== See also ==
- 2020 in 100 metres
- Italian all-time lists – 100 metres
- Italian all-time lists – 200 metres
- Italian all-time lists – 4 × 100 metres relay
