= Agata Forkasiewicz =

Polish sprinter

Personal information
- Born: 13 January 1994 (age 32) Wrocław, Poland
- Education: Wrocław Medical University
- Height: 168 cm (5 ft 6 in) (2016)
- Weight: 54 kg (119 lb) (2016)

Sport
- Sport: Athletics
- Events: 60 metres, 100 metres, 200 metres, 300 metres, 4 × 100 metres relay
- Club: KS AZS AWF Wrocław
- Coached by: William Rostek
Medal record
Women's athletics
Representing Poland
Summer Universiade
Silver medal – second place	2017 Taipei	4 x 100m relay

Agata Forkasiewicz (born 13 January 1994) is a Polish sprinter. She competed at the 2015 World Championships in Athletics and 2016 IAAF World Indoor Championships.

She was selected to represent Poland at the 2016 Summer Olympics in the women's 4 × 100 metres relay event.

== Competition record ==
Year	Competition	Venue	Position	Event	Notes
Representing Poland
2015	European U23 Championships	Tallinn, Estonia	8th	100 m	11.98
2015	European U23 Championships	Tallinn, Estonia	13th (h)	200 m	23.83 (w)
2015	European U23 Championships	Tallinn, Estonia	5th	4 × 100 m relay	44.54
2015	World Championships	Beijing, China	11th (h)	4 × 100 m relay	43.20
2016	World Indoor Championships	Portland, United States	29th (h)	60 m	7.45
2016	European Championships	Amsterdam, Netherlands	21st (sf)	200 m	23.59
2016	European Championships	Amsterdam, Netherlands	7th	4 × 100 m relay	43.24
2017	European Indoor Championships	Belgrade, Serbia	22nd (sf)	60 m	7.46
2017	Universiade	Taipei, Taiwan	12th (sf)	200 m	24.10
2017	Universiade	Taipei, Taiwan	2nd	4 × 100 m relay	44.19
2019	Universiade	Naples, Italy	34th (h)	100 m	11.98
2019	Universiade	Naples, Italy	7th (h)	4 × 100 m relay	45.17^{1}

^{1}Disqualified in the final

== Personal bests ==
Outdoor

- 100 metres – 11.46 (+0.4 m/s, Kraków 2016)
- 200 metres – 23.53 (+0.9 m/s, Amsterdam 2016)

Indoor

- 60 metres – 7.28 (Toruń 2017)
- 200 metres – 23.63 (Toruń 2016)
