= Martina Amidei =

Italian sprinter (born 1991)

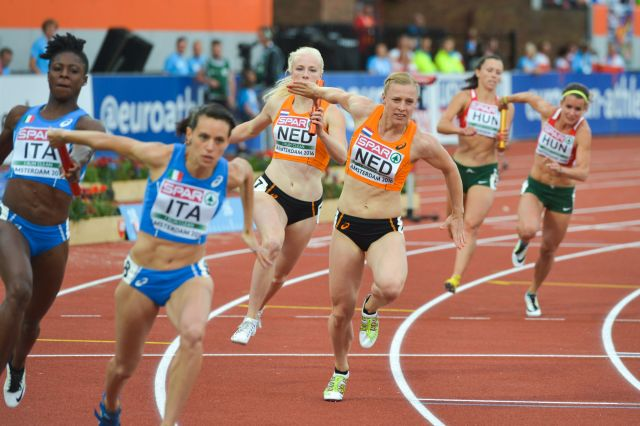
- Martina Amidei (with the Italian jersey) receives the baton from Gloria Hopper at the 2016 European Athletics Championships

Personal information
- Born: 8 April 1991 (age 35)

Sport
- Country: Italy
- Sport: Track and field
- Event: 200 metres

Martina Amidei (born 8 April 1991) is an Italian sprinter. She competed in the 200 metres at the 2016 European Athletics Championships.

== See also ==
- Italian all-time lists - 4x100 metres relay
