= Rivinilda Mentai =

Portuguese sprinter

Rivinilda Correia Mentai (born 1 April 1994, Bissau) is a Portuguese sprinter who specializes in the 400 metres.

She competed at the 2012 World Junior Championships, the 2015 European U23 Championships (200 m) and the 2018 Mediterranean Games without reaching the final.

Mentai has also won a national 200 m title in 2015 and national indoor titles in 2016, 2017 and 2018.

In the 4 × 400 metres relay she won a gold medal at the 2018 Ibero-American Championships and finished fifth at the 2018 Mediterranean Games. She also competed at the 2015 European U23 Championships (4 × 100 m relay), the 2016 European Championships, the 2018 World Indoor Championships and the 2018 European Championships without reaching the final. At the 2018 World Indoor Championships the team did however set a new Portuguese indoor record of 3:35.43 minutes.

Her personal best time is 53.65 seconds, achieved in May 2018 in Lisbon.
