= Klára Seidlová =

Czech sprinter

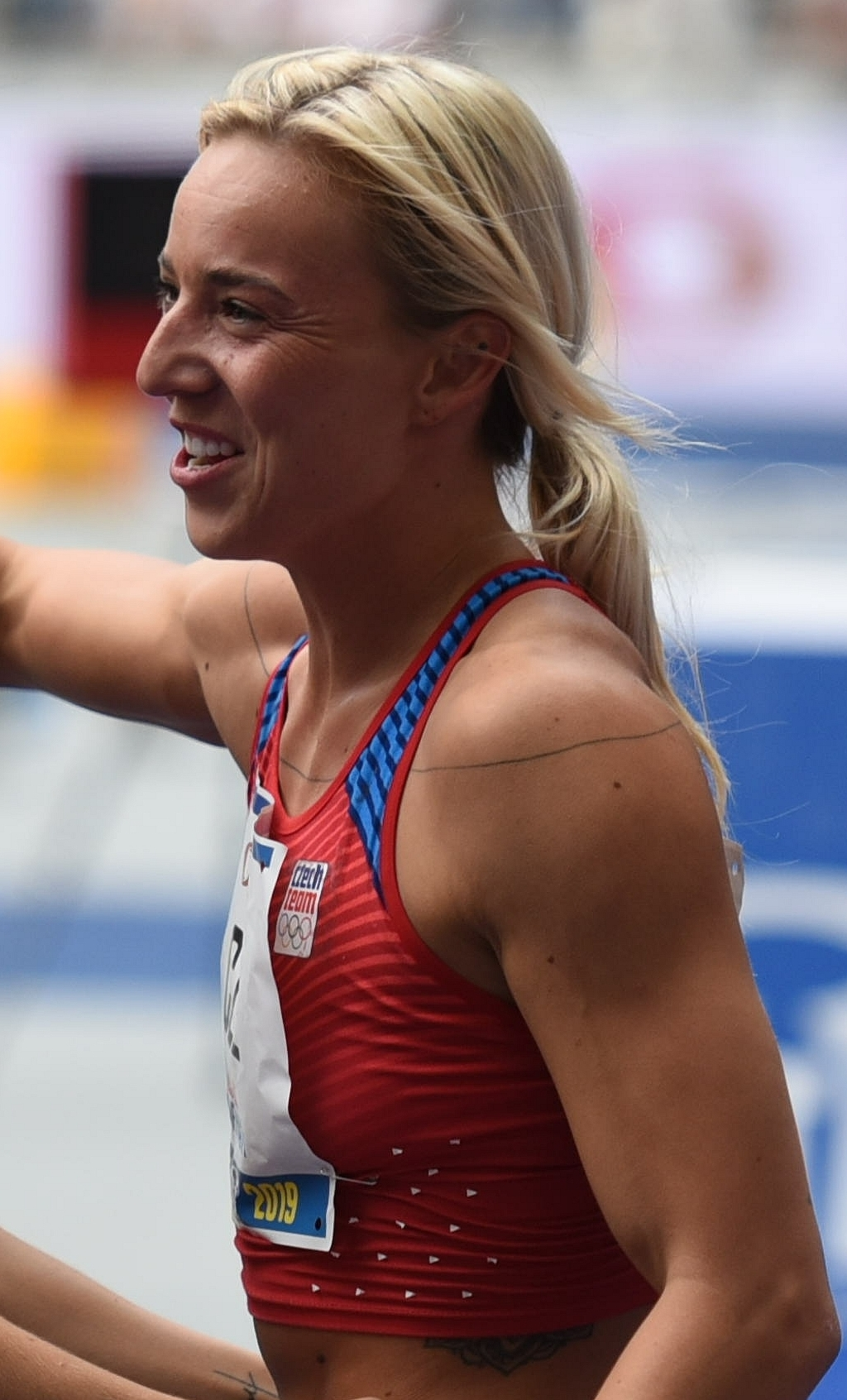

Personal information
- Born: 10 March 1994 (age 31)

Sport
- Sport: Athletics
- Event(s): 100 m, 200 m
- Club: Univerzitní sportovní klub Praha

Klára Seidlová (born 10 March 1994) is a Czech sprinter. She won a bronze medal at the 2013 European Junior Championships. She also represented her country at the 2018 World Indoor Championships reaching the semifinals.

== International competitions ==
Year	Competition	Venue	Position	Event	Notes
Representing the Czech Republic
2013	European Junior Championships	Rieti, Italy	1st	100 m	11.88
2013	European Junior Championships	Rieti, Italy	6th	200 m	24.16
2013	European Junior Championships	Rieti, Italy	–	4 × 100 m relay	DNF
2017	European Indoor Championships	Belgrade, Serbia	19th (sf)	60 m	7.43
2018	World Indoor Championships	Birmingham, United Kingdom	22nd (sf)	60 m	7.35
2018	European Championships	Berlin, Germany	15th (h)	100 m	11.63
2018	European Championships	Berlin, Germany	12th (h)	4 × 100 m relay	44.12
2019	European Indoor Championships	Glasgow, United Kingdom	21st (sf)	60 m	7.41
2019	World Relays	Yokohama, Japan	15th (h)	4 × 100 m relay	44.67

== Personal bests ==
Outdoor

- 100 metres – 11.54 (+1.8 m/s, Zeulenroda 2017)
- 200 metres – 23.66 (-0.1 m/s, Třinec 2017)

Indoor

- 60 metres – 7.23 (Prague 2018)
- 200 metres – 24.42 (Prague 2017)
