= Cristina Lara =

Spanish sprinter (born 1995)

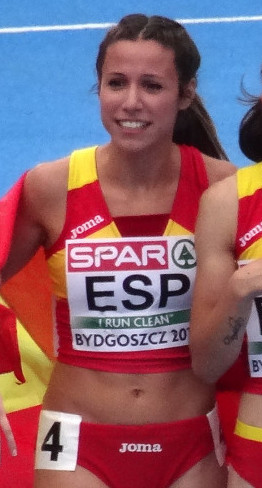
- Cristina Lara in 2017

Personal information
- Born: 5 August 1995 (age 30) Barcelona, Spain
- Height: 1.65 m (5 ft 5 in)
- Weight: 54 kg (119 lb)

Sport
- Sport: Athletics
- Event(s): 100 m, 200 m
- Club: FC Barcelona
- Coached by: Ricardo Diéguez

Cristina Lara Pérez (born 5 August 1995) is a Spanish sprinter. She won a gold medal in the 4 × 100 metres relay at the 2017 European U23 Championships.

== International competitions ==
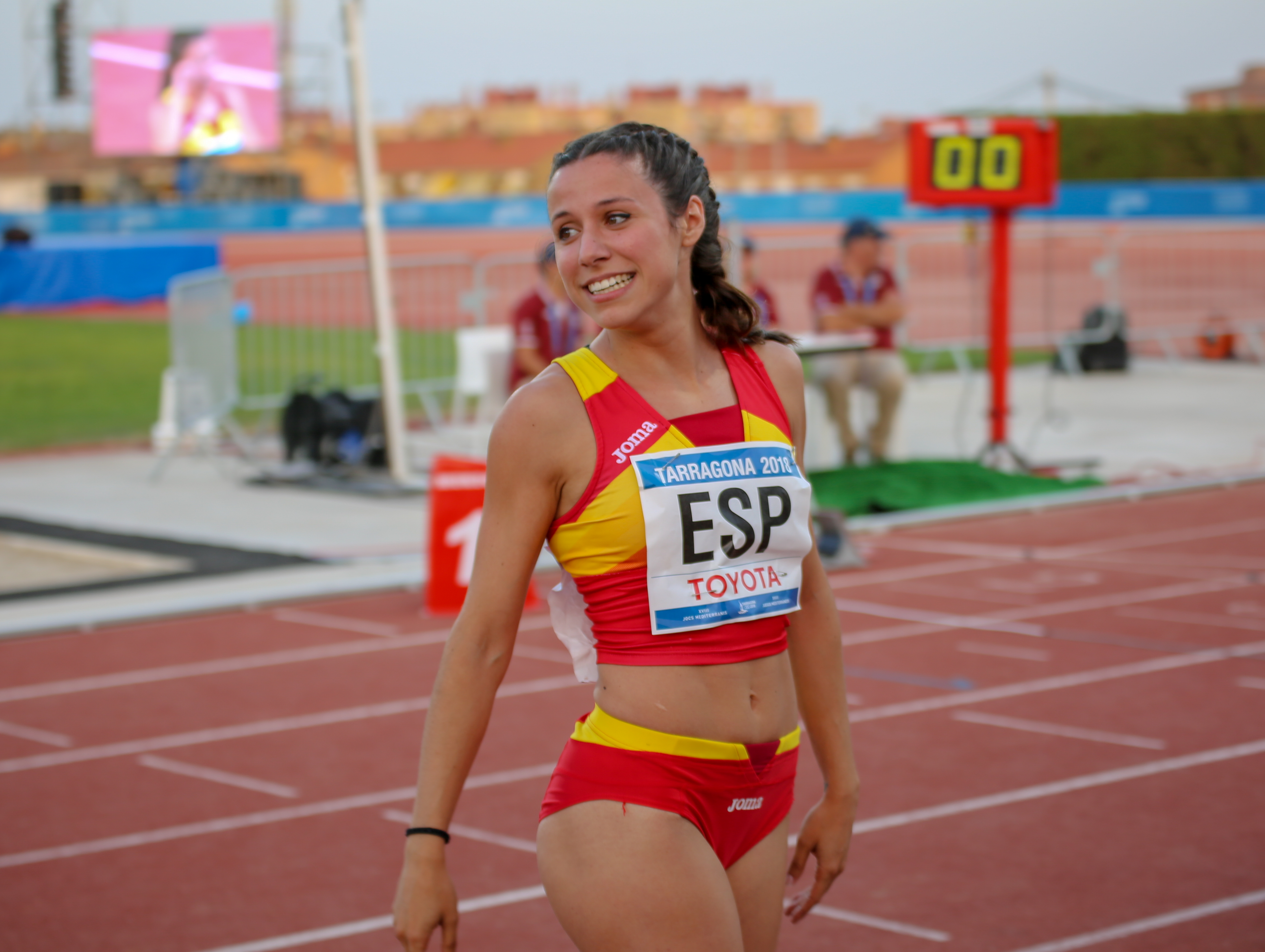
Cristina Lara en los Juegos del Mediterráneo 2018

Year	Competition	Venue	Position	Event	Notes
Representing Spain
2012	World Junior Championships	Barcelona, Spain	34th (h)	200 m	24.73
2012	World Junior Championships	Barcelona, Spain	–	4 × 100 m relay	DQ
2013	European Junior Championships	Rieti, Italy	17th (h)	100 m	11.91
2014	World Junior Championships	Eugene, Oregon	20th (sf)	100 m	12.11
2014	European Championships	Zürich, Switzerland	14th (h)	4 × 100 m relay	44.68
2015	European U23 Championships	Tallinn, Estonia	13th (h)	100 m	11.83
2015	European U23 Championships	Tallinn, Estonia	14th (h)	200 m	23.85
2016	European Championships	Amsterdam, Netherlands	10th (h)	4 × 100 m relay	44.14
2017	European Indoor Championships	Belgrade, Serbia	14th (sf)	60 m	7.40
2017	European U23 Championships	Bydgoszcz, Poland	11th (sf)	200 m	23.57
2017	European U23 Championships	Bydgoszcz, Poland	1st	4 × 100 m relay	43.96
2018	Mediterranean Games	Tarragona, Spain	6th	100 m	11.65
2018	Mediterranean Games	Tarragona, Spain	2nd	4 × 100 m relay	43.31
2018	European Championships	Berlin, Germany	18th (h)	100 m	11.65
2018	European Championships	Berlin, Germany	8th	4 × 100 m relay	43.54
2021	World Relays	Chorzów, Poland	9th (h)	4 × 100 m relay	44.38

== Personal bests ==
Outdoor

- 100 metres – 11.40 (+1.9 m/s, Barcelona 2017)
- 200 metres – 23.22 (+0.2 m/s, Ciudad Real 2017)

Indoor

- 60 metres – 7.36 (Salamanca 2017)
- 200 metres – 23.78 (Madrid 2016)
