= Diana Khubeseryan =

Armenian athlete

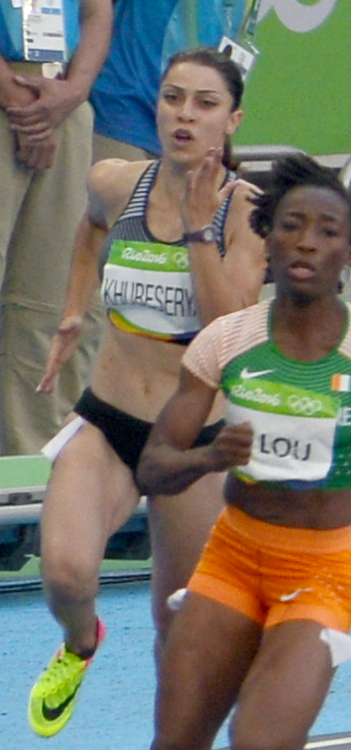
- Khubeseryan (left) at the 2016 Olympics

Personal information
- Born: 5 May 1994 (age 32) Yerevan
- Height: 170 cm (5 ft 7 in)
- Weight: 60 kg (132 lb)

Sport
- Country: Armenia
- Sport: Track and field
- Event(s): 100 metres, 200 metres
- Coached by: Gegham Ter-Grigoryan

Achievements and titles
- Personal best(s): 100 m – 11.84 (2015); 200 m – 23.18 (2016)

Diana Khubeseryan (born 5 May 1994) is an Armenian sprinter. In 2016, she competed in the 200 metres at the European Championships and Rio Olympics, but failed to reach the finals. Khubeseryan started as a swimmer and took up athletics aged 12. She later studied journalism at the Armenian State Institute of Physical Culture and Sport in Yerevan.
