= Gloria Hooper (athlete) =

Italian sprinter (born 1992)

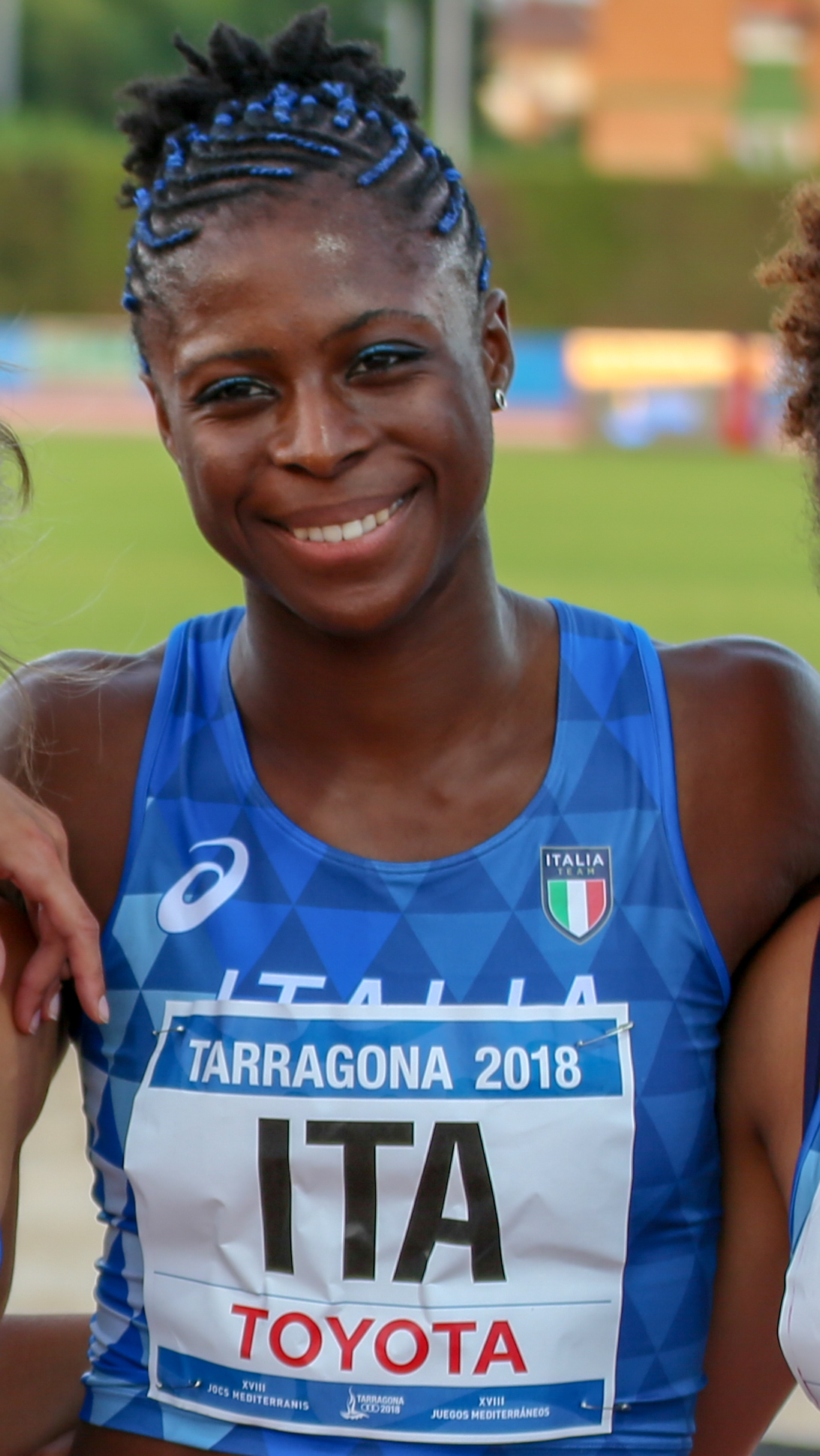
- Gloria Hooper in 2018

Personal information
- National team: Italy
- Born: 3 March 1992 (age 34) Villafranca di Verona, Italy
- Height: 1.75 m (5 ft 9 in)
- Weight: 63 kg (139 lb)

Sport
- Sport: Athletics
- Event: Sprint
- Club: Centro Sportivo Carabinieri
- Coached by: Renzo Chemello

Achievements and titles
- Personal bests: 100 m: 11.24 (2021); 200 m: 22.89 (2016)
Medal record
World Relays
Gold medal – first place	2021 Chorzów	4×100 m relay
European Championships
Bronze medal – third place	2022 Munich	4 × 100 m relay
Mediterranean Games
Silver medal – second place	2018 Tarragona	200 m
European U23 Championships
Bronze medal – third place	2013 Tampere	200 metres
Bronze medal – third place	2013 Tampere	4 × 100 m relay
European Junior Championships
Silver medal – second place	2011 Tallinn	4 × 100 m relay

Gloria Hooper (born 3 March 1992) is an Italian sprinter who won a silver medal at the 2018 Mediterranean Games, and a bronze medal at the 2022 European Championships in the 4 × 100 m. She won seven times the national championships. She competed at the 2012, 2016 and 2024 Summer Olympics, in 200 m (in 2012 and 2016) and the 4 × 100 m (in 2024).

== Career ==
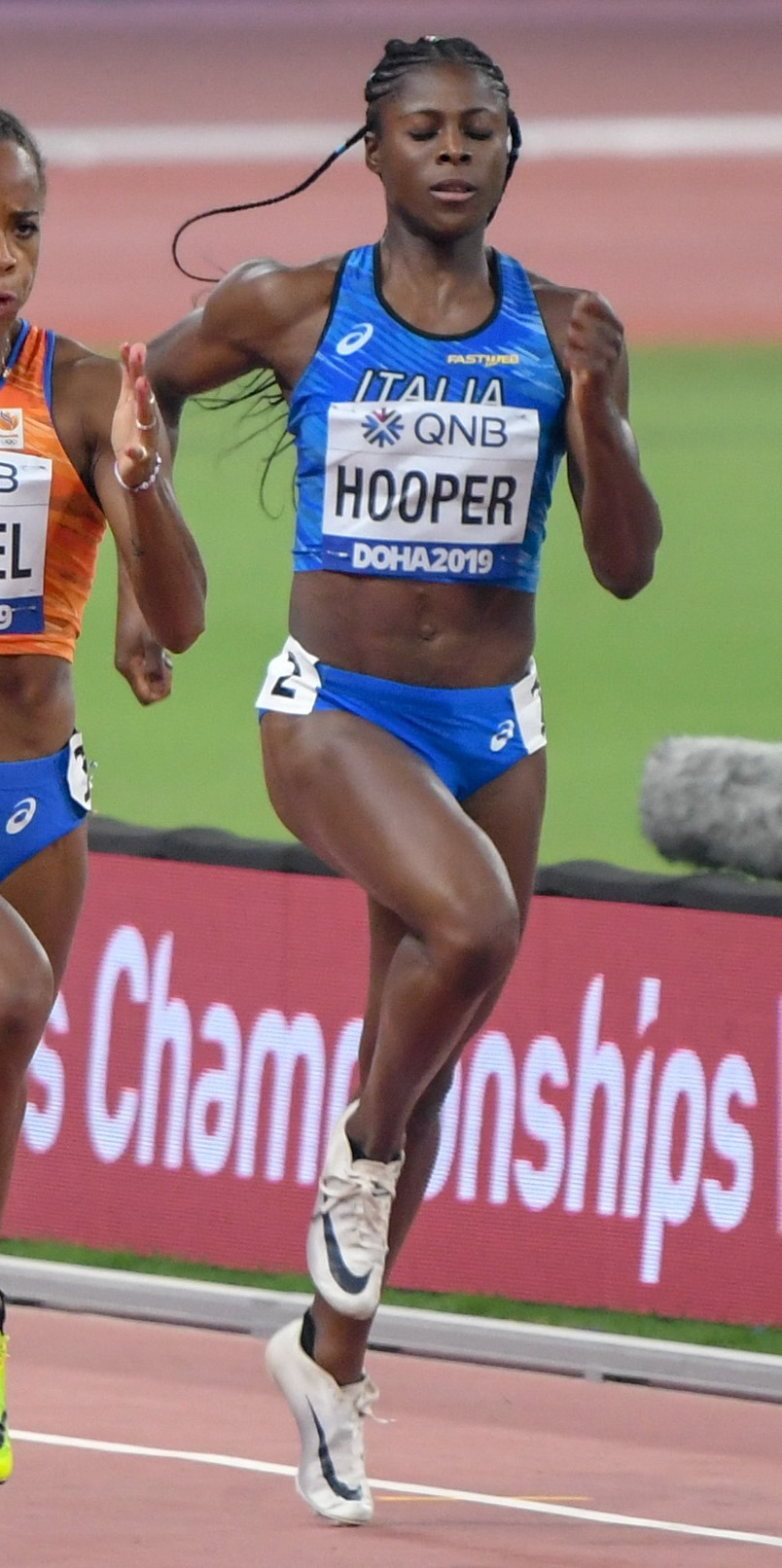
Hooper at the 2019 World Athletics Championships.

Born in Villafranca di Verona, her parents arrived in Naples from Ghana in 1985. She made her international debut for Italy at the 2012 European Athletics Championships.

== National records ==
- 4 × 100 m relay: 42.90 ( (Qatar) Doha, 4 October 2019), she ran second leg in the team with Johanelis Herrera, Anna Bongiorni, Irene Siragusa – current holder

== Personal bests ==
- 100 metres: 11.24 +1.5 ( (Italy) Rieti, 22 May 2021)
- 200 metres: 22.89 +1.4 ( (Italy) Rieti, 26 June 2016)

== Achievements ==
Year	Competition	Venue	Position	Event	Time	Notes
2010	World Junior Championships	(Canada) Moncton	32nd (h)	200m	24.74	(wind: +0.5 m/s)
2011	European Junior Championships	(Estonia) Tallinn	7th	200 m	23.95	
2011	European Junior Championships	(Estonia) Tallinn	2nd	4 × 100 m relay	44.52	(junior)
2012	European Championships	(Finland) Helsinki	Semi-Finals	DSQ	–	
2013	European U23 Championships	(Finland) Tampere	3rd	200m	23.24	(wind: -0.5 m/s)
2013	European U23 Championships	(Finland) Tampere	3rd	4 × 100 m relay	43.86	
2015	World Championships	(China) Beijing	16th (sf)	200 m	22.92	
2015	World Championships	(China) Beijing	12th (h)	4 × 100 m relay	43.22	
2017	European Indoor Championships	(Serbia) Belgrade	10th (sf)	60 m	7.34	
2017	IAAF World Relays	(The Bahamas) Nassau	–	4 × 100 m relay	DQ	
2019	World Championships	(Qatar) Doha	32nd (heat)	200 m	23.33	
2019	World Championships	(Qatar) Doha	7th	4 × 100 m relay	42.98	
2021	World Relays	(Poland) Chorzów	1st	4×100 m relay	43.79	SB

== National titles ==
- Italian Athletics Championships
  - 100 metres: 2013, 2015, 2016 (3)
  - 200 metres: 2014, 2016, 2017, 2019 (4)

== See also ==
- 2020 in 100 metres
- Italian all-time lists – 100 metres
- Italian all-time lists – 200 metres
- Italian all-time lists – 4 × 100 metres relay
- Italy at the 2012 European Athletics Championships
