= Sarah Atcho-Jaquier =

Swiss sprinter (born 1995)

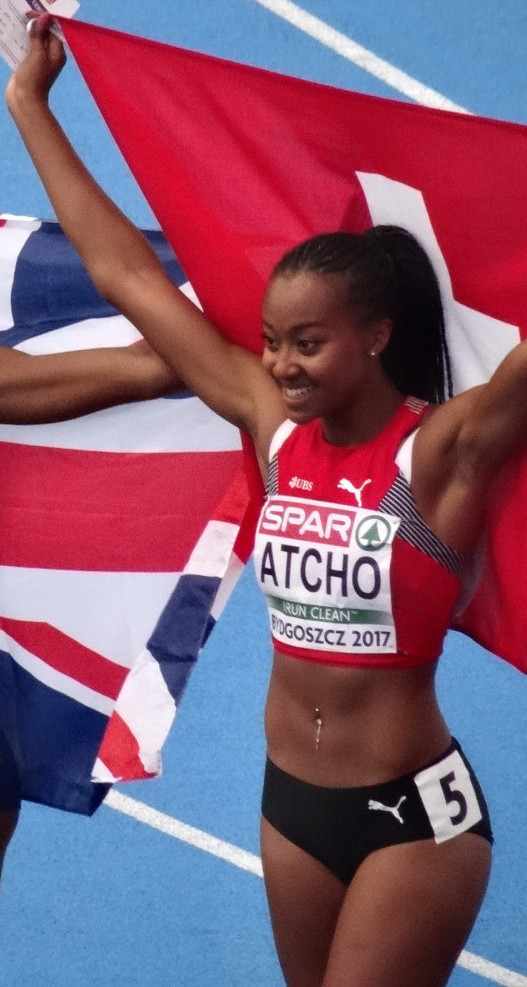
- Sarah Atcho in 2017

Personal information
- Born: Sarah Atcho; 1 June 1995 (age 31) Lausanne, Switzerland
- Height: 1.80 m (5 ft 11 in)
- Weight: 63 kg (139 lb)

Sport
- Country: Switzerland
- Sport: Track and field
- Event(s): 100 metres 4 × 100 metres relay

Sarah Atcho-Jaquier (born 1 June 1995) is a Swiss sprinter. She competed in the 4 × 100 metres relay event at the 2015 World Championships in Beijing, at the 2016 Summer Olympics and at the 2017 World Championships in London.

In January 2022, Atcho announced that she had been diagnosed with pericarditis after receiving a COVID-19 vaccination booster shot. After a six-week break from training, she was able to resume her training.
