= Alica Schmidt =

German sprinter and hurdler (born 1998)

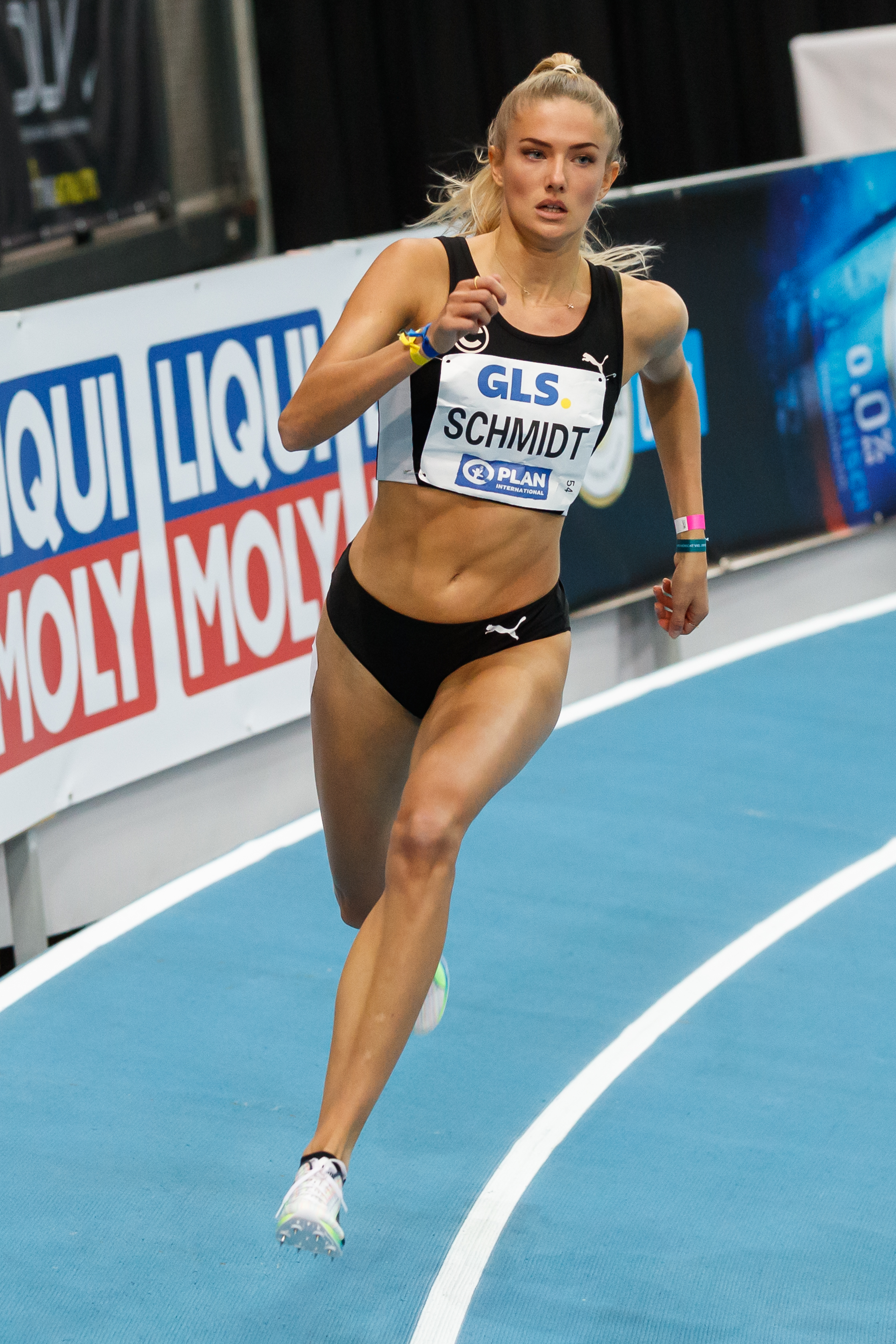
- Schmidt in 2022

Personal information
- Full name: Alica Megan Schmidt
- Born: 8 November 1998 (age 28) Worms, Germany
- Education: Fresenius University of Applied Sciences
- Occupation: Athlete
- Years active: 2017–present
- Height: 1.75 m (5 ft 9 in)
- Weight: 55 kg (121 lb)

Sport
- Sport: Track and field; Athletics; Running
- Events: Sprints; 200 metres; 400 metres; 400 metres hurdles; 800 metres
- Club: SCC Berlin
Medal record
Women's athletics
Representing Germany
European Athletics U20 Championships
Silver medal – second place	2017 Grosseto	4 × 400 m relay
European Athletics U23 Championships
Bronze medal – third place	2019 Gävle	4 × 400 m relay

Alica Megan Schmidt (German pronunciation: [aˈliː.sa ʃmɪt]; born 8 November 1998) is a German runner. She was part of the national team that came second in the 4 × 400 metres relay event at the 2017 European Athletics U20 Championships, and third in the same discipline at the 2019 European Athletics U23 Championships. She was previously a fitness coach of Bundesliga club Borussia Dortmund. Schmidt was part of the German relay squad at the 2020 Summer Olympics, although she did not compete.

== Early life ==
Schmidt was born in 1998 in Worms, Germany. Her family now lives in Ingolstadt, Bavaria, Germany. She attended Fresenius University of Applied Sciences.

== Career ==
Schmidt started competing in the 200 metres, 400 metres, and 800 metres running events. In 2018, she started competing in 400 metres hurdles events. Schmidt began her career training at MTV Ingolstadt.

In 2017, Schmidt came second in the 200 metres event at the under-20s German Championship. At the 2017 European Athletics U20 Championships, Schmidt was part of the German 4 × 400 metres relay team that finished second, alongside Vanessa Aniteye, Meike Gerlach and Corinna Schwab. Their time of 03:33:08 was faster than the previous age group world record, but they finished behind the Ukrainian team, who set the new world record. It was the first medal at the Championships for an Ingolstadt athlete since 1999. Schmidt also set a personal best time of 54.23 seconds in a qualifying round of the individual 400 metres event at the Championships. She was withdrawn from the individual 400 metres final in order to focus on the relay event. In the same year, she came second at the German under-20 Championship in the 400 metres event.

In October 2017, Schmidt started training at SC Potsdam, after moving to Brandenburg for personal reasons. Ahead of the 2019 season, Schmidt joined SCC Berlin. She was part of the German team that came third in the 4 × 400 metres relay event at the 2019 European Athletics U23 Championships. At the 2019 German Athletics Championships, Schmidt came third in the under-23s 400 metres event, and was part of the SCC Berlin team that came second in the 4 × 400 metres relay event.

Schmidt was appointed as Borussia Dortmund's fitness coach for the 2020–21 Bundesliga season.

Schmidt was in the German squad for the 4 × 400 metres relay event at the 2021 European Athletics Indoor Championships. Schmidt was selected for the German relay squad at the delayed 2020 Summer Olympics; she travelled to the games as a substitute in the mixed relay, in which she did not run. She came second in the 400 metres event at the 2022 German Indoor Athletics Championships, behind Corinna Schwab. Schmidt chose not to compete at the 2022 World Athletics Indoor Championships, in order to focus on her outdoor season. Schmidt was part of the German team that finished fifth in the final of the 4 × 400 metres relay event at the 2022 European Athletics Championships.

In June 2024, Schmidt was selected in the German squad for the 4 × 400 mixed relay event at the 2024 Summer Olympics. It was a result of her helping the mixed relay to qualify for the Olympics in the first place through their good team performance at the World Athletics Relays in Nassau, Bahamas. During the late-season of 2024, she ran the 600m at the ISTAF in Berlin recording a personal best of 1.24.88min. From the 2025 season onward, she transitioned from the 400 m to the 800 m distance.

In 2025, Schmidt competed at the outdoor national championships and was eliminated in the 800m heats. In her debut 800m season in 2025, she set an outdoor personal best of 2:03,21min at a meeting in Lucerne, while setting her indoor personal best of 2:03,99min. at the Meeting Metz Moselle Athlélor in February 2026. In 2026, she was eliminated in the preliminary heats at both the German indoor and outdoor national championships.

== Personal bests ==
400m: 52.07s

600m: 1:24.88min.

800m: 2:03,21min (Luzern, Schweiz)

== Public image ==
In 2017, Australian magazine Busted Coverage described Schmidt as "the world's sexiest athlete". According to Schmidt, this led to a major increase in her social media followers; she currently has 5.5 million followers on Instagram. Schmidt has been sponsored by Puma.
