= 2018 European Athletics Championships – Women's 4 × 100 metres relay =

Women's 4 × 100 metres relay at the 2018 European Athletics Championships
- Venue: Olympic Stadium
- Location: Berlin
- Dates: 12 August 2018
- Competitors: 62 from 15 nations
- Winning time: 41.88

Medalists
gold medal	Asha Philip; Imani-Lara Lansiquot; Bianca Williams; Dina Asher-Smith; Daryll Neita*	Great Britain
silver medal	Dafne Schippers; Marije van Hunenstijn; Jamile Samuel; Naomi Sedney	Netherlands
bronze medal	Lisa Marie Kwayie; Gina Lückenkemper; Tatjana Pinto; Rebekka Haase	Germany

The women's 4 × 100 metres relay at the 2018 European Athletics Championships took place at the Olympic Stadium on 12 August.

== Records ==
Standing records prior to the 2018 European Athletics Championships
World record	United States; Tianna Madison, Allyson Felix; Bianca Knight, Carmelita Jeter	40.82	London, Great Britain	10 August 2012
European record	East Germany; Silke Gladisch, Sabine Rieger; Ingrid Auerswald, Marlies Göhr	41.37	Canberra, Australia	6 October 1985
Championship record	East Germany; Silke Möller, Katrin Krabbe; Kerstin Behrendt, Sabine Günther	41.68	Split, Yugoslavia	1 September 1990
World Leading	(United States) Louisiana State University; Mikiah Brisco, Kortnei Johnson; Rachel Misher, Aleia Hobbs	42.05	Knoxville, United States	13 May 2018
European Leading	Germany; Rebekka Haase, Keshia Kwadwo; Tatjana Pinto, Gina Lückenkemper	42.24	Regensburg, Germany	3 June 2018
Broken records during the 2018 European Athletics Championships
European Leading	Great Britain; Asha Philip, Imani-Lara Lansiquot; Bianca Williams, Daryll Neita	42.19	Berlin, Germany	12 August 2018
World leading	Great Britain; Asha Philip, Imani-Lara Lansiquot; Bianca Williams, Dina Asher-Smith	41.88	Berlin, Germany	12 August 2018
European Leading	Great Britain; Asha Philip, Imani-Lara Lansiquot; Bianca Williams, Dina Asher-Smith	41.88	Berlin, Germany	12 August 2018

== Schedule ==
Date	Time	Round
12 August 2018	19:20	Round 1
12 August 2018	21:20	Final

== Results ==
=== Round 1 ===
First 3 in each heat (Q) and 2 best performers (q) advance to the Final.

Rank	Heat	Lane	Nation	Athletes	Time	Notes
1	1	2	Great Britain	Asha Philip, Imani-Lara Lansiquot, Bianca Williams, Daryll Neita	42.19	Q, EL
2	2	6	Germany	Lisa Marie Kwayie, Gina Lückenkemper, Tatjana Pinto, Rebekka Haase	42.34	Q
3	2	8	Switzerland	Ajla Del Ponte, Sarah Atcho, Mujinga Kambundji, Salomé Kora	42.62	Q
4	1	3	Netherlands	Dafne Schippers, Marije van Hunenstijn, Jamile Samuel, Naomi Sedney	42.62	Q, SB
5	1	8	France	Orlann Ombissa-Dzangue, Stella Akakpo, Jennifer Galais, Carolle Zahi	43.06	Q, SB
6	1	4	Poland	Kamila Ciba, Anna Kiełbasińska, Martyna Kotwiła, Ewa Swoboda	43.20	q, SB
7	1	7	Spain	María Isabel Pérez, Estela García, Paula Sevilla, Cristina Lara	43.38	q
8	2	2	Italy	Johanelis Herrera Abreu, Gloria Hooper, Irene Siragusa, Audrey Alloh	43.74	Q
9	2	3	Ireland	Joan Healy, Phil Healy, Ciara Neville, Gina Akpe-Moses	43.80	NR
10	2	1	Ukraine	Hanna Plotitsyna, Alina Kalistratova, Yana Kachur, Anastasiya Holeneva	43.90	SB
11	2	7	Denmark	Louise Østergård, Ida Kathrine Karstoft, Mette Graversgaard, Mathilde Kramer	44.09	NR
12	2	5	Czech Republic	Lucie Domská, Marcela Pírková, Jana Slaninová, Klára Seidlová	44.12	SB
13	1	5	Hungary	Anasztázia Nguyen, Éva Kaptur, Gréta Kerekes, Luca Kozák	44.15	
14	1	6	Greece	Grigoría-Emmanouéla Keramidá, Elisavet Pesiridou, Rafailía Spanoudaki-Hatziriga, Korina Politi	44.48	SB
15	2	4	Sweden	Claudia Payton, Hanna Adriansson-Norberg, Malin Ström, Elin Ostlund	44.51	SB

=== Final ===
Rank	Lane	Nation	Athletes	Time	Notes
1st place, gold medalist(s)	3	Great Britain	Asha Philip, Imani-Lara Lansiquot, Bianca Williams, Dina Asher-Smith	41.88	WL
2nd place, silver medalist(s)	4	Netherlands	Dafne Schippers, Marije van Hunenstijn, Jamile Samuel, Naomi Sedney	42.15	SB
3rd place, bronze medalist(s)	6	Germany	Lisa Marie Kwayie, Gina Lückenkemper, Tatjana Pinto, Rebekka Haase	42.23	SB
4	5	Switzerland	Ajla Del Ponte, Sarah Atcho, Mujinga Kambundji, Salomé Kora	42.30	
5	8	France	Orlann Ombissa-Dzangue, Stella Akakpo, Jennifer Galais, Carolle Zahi	43.10	
6	1	Poland	Kamila Ciba, Anna Kiełbasińska, Martyna Kotwiła, Ewa Swoboda	43.34	
7	7	Italy	Johanelis Herrera Abreu, Gloria Hooper, Irene Siragusa, Audrey Alloh	43.42	SB
8	2	Spain	María Isabel Pérez, Estela García, Paula Sevilla, Cristina Lara	43.54	
