= 2018 European Athletics Championships – Women's 200 metres =

Women's 200 metres at the 2018 European Athletics Championships
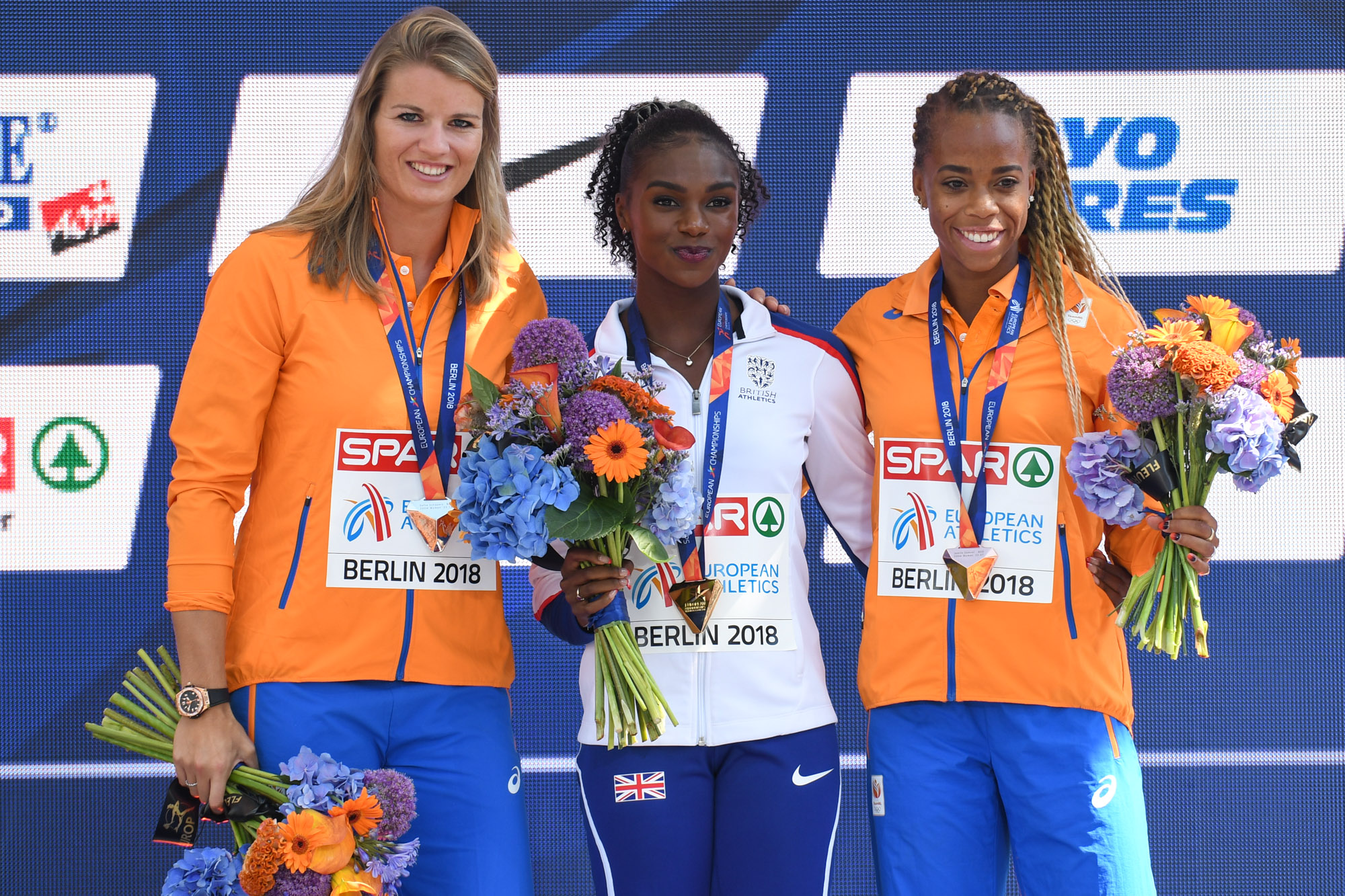
- Venue: Olympiastadion
- Location: Berlin
- Dates: 10 August (round 1 & semifinals); 11 August (final)
- Competitors: 34 from 18 nations
- Winning time: 21.89

Medalists
gold medal	Dina Asher-Smith	Great Britain
silver medal	Dafne Schippers	Netherlands
bronze medal	Jamile Samuel	Netherlands

The women's 200 metres at the 2018 European Athletics Championships takes place at the Olympiastadion on 10 and 11 August.

== Records ==
Standing records prior to the 2018 European Athletics Championships
World record	Florence Griffith Joyner (USA)	21.34	Seoul, South Korea	29 September 1988
European record	Dafne Schippers (NED)	21.63	Beijing, China	28 August 2015
Championship record	Heike Drechsler (GDR)	21.71	Stuttgart, West Germany	29 August 1986
World leading	Blessing Okagbare (NGR)	22.04	Abilene, United States	24 March 2018
European leading	Dina Asher-Smith (GBR)	22.25	Oslo, Norway	22 July 2018
Broken records during the 2018 European Athletics Championships
World leading	Dina Asher-Smith (GBR)	21.89	Berlin, Germany	11 August 2018
European leading	Dina Asher-Smith (GBR)	21.89	Berlin, Germany	11 August 2018

== Schedule ==
Date	Time	Round
10 August 2018	11:45	Round 1
10 August 2018	19:48	Semifinals
11 August 2018	20:45	Final

All times are local times (UTC+2)

== Results ==
=== Round 1 ===
First 3 in each heat (Q) and the next 5 fastest (q) advanced to the semifinals. The top 10 ranked athletes received a bye to the semifinals.

Wind: Heat 1: -0.3 m/s, Heat 2: -0.5 m/s, Heat 3: +0.4 m/s

Rank	Heat	Lane	Name	Nationality	Time	Note
1	1	5	Laura Müller	Germany	23.06	Q, SB
2	3	1	Krystsina Tsimanouskaya	Belarus	23.07	Q, NU23R
3	1	7	Anna Kiełbasińska	Poland	23.20	Q
4	3	6	Gloria Hooper	Italy	23.28	Q
5	3	4	Phil Healy	Ireland	23.34	Q
6	1	1	Sindija Bukša	Latvia	23.36	Q
7	2	7	Rebekka Haase	Germany	23.44	Q
8	3	7	Inna Eftimova	Bulgaria	23.56	q
9	1	2	Manon Depuydt	Belgium	23.59	q
10	3	2	Lorène Bazolo	Portugal	23.60	q
11	2	1	Irene Siragusa	Italy	23.60	Q
12	2	5	Martyna Kotwiła	Poland	23.62	Q
13	1	6	Cornelia Halbheer	Switzerland	23.63	q
14	2	2	Estela García	Spain	23.64	q
15	2	4	Marcela Pírková	Czech Republic	23.72	
16	3	5	Alina Kalistratova	Ukraine	23.79	
17	2	3	Ezinne Okparaebo	Norway	23.84	
18	1	4	Paula Sevilla	Spain	23.91	
19	3	8	Jaël Bestué	Spain	23.92	
20	2	6	Alexandra Bezeková	Slovakia	23.93	
21	3	3	Helene Rønningen	Norway	23.96	
22	2	8	Yana Kachur	Ukraine	24.00	
23	1	3	Yelyzaveta Bryzhina	Ukraine	24.21	
24	1	8	Charlotte Wingfield	Malta	24.40	

=== Semifinals ===
First 2 in each heat (Q) and the next 2 fastest (q) advanced to the final.

Wind: Heat 1: +1.1 m/s, Heat 2: +1.4 m/s, Heat 3: +0.2 m/s

Rank	Heat	Lane	Name	Nationality	Time	Note
1	1	4	Dina Asher-Smith*	Great Britain	22.33	Q
2	3	4	Jamile Samuel*	Netherlands	22.58	Q
3	1	3	Ivet Lalova-Collio*	Bulgaria	22.65	Q
4	2	4	Dafne Schippers*	Netherlands	22.69	Q
5	1	5	Bianca Williams*	Great Britain	22.83	q
6	2	5	Beth Dobbin*	Great Britain	22.84	Q
7	3	5	Mujinga Kambundji*	Switzerland	22.84	Q
8	1	7	Laura Müller	Germany	22.87	q, SB
9	2	3	Sarah Atcho*	Switzerland	22.88	
10	3	2	Krystsina Tsimanouskaya	Belarus	23.03	NU23R
11	2	6	Phil Healy	Ireland	23.23	
12	3	6	Jessica-Bianca Wessolly*	Germany	23.26	
13	3	3	Jodie Williams*	Great Britain	23.28	
14	2	7	Anna Kiełbasińska	Poland	23.29	
15	3	7	Irene Siragusa	Italy	23.30	
16	1	6	Martyna Kotwiła	Poland	23.41	
17	2	2	Rebekka Haase	Germany	23.42	
18	2	8	Gloria Hooper	Italy	23.43	
19	1	2	Estela García	Spain	23.46	
20	2	1	Manon Depuydt	Belgium	23.60	
21	3	1	Inna Eftimova	Bulgaria	23.62	
22	1	1	Lorène Bazolo	Portugal	23.80	
23	1	8	Cornelia Halbheer	Switzerland	23.98	
–	3	8	Sindija Bukša	Latvia	DNS	

* Athletes who received a bye to the semifinals

=== Final ===
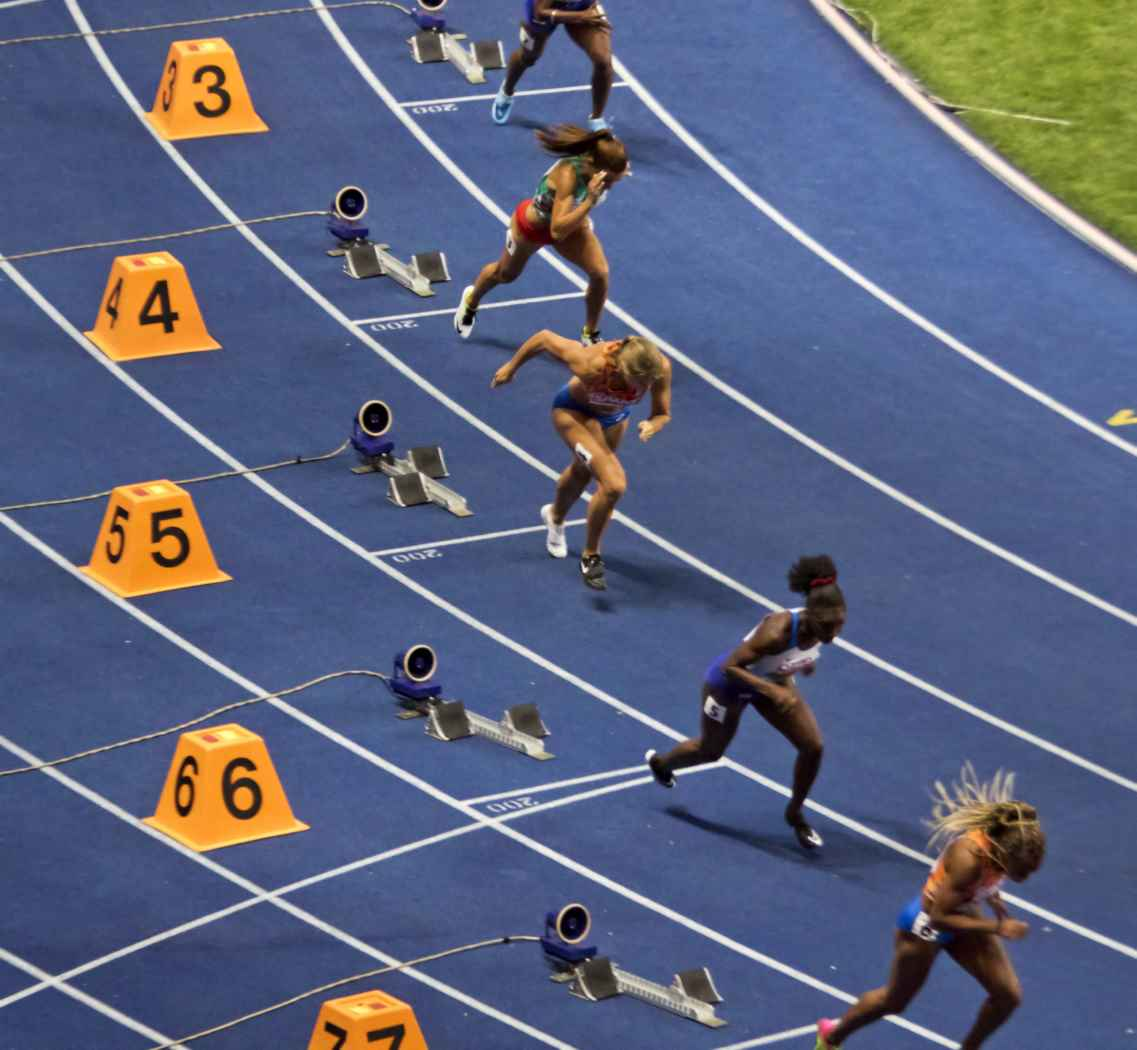
The start of the final

The medals were determined in the final.

Wind: +0.2 m/s

Rank	Lane	Name	Nationality	Time	Note
1st place, gold medalist(s)	5	Dina Asher-Smith	Great Britain	21.89	WL, NR
2nd place, silver medalist(s)	4	Dafne Schippers	Netherlands	22.14	SB
3rd place, bronze medalist(s)	6	Jamile Samuel	Netherlands	22.37	=PB
4	8	Mujinga Kambundji	Switzerland	22.45	SB
5	3	Ivet Lalova-Collio	Bulgaria	22.82	
6	2	Bianca Williams	Great Britain	22.88	
7	7	Beth Dobbin	Great Britain	22.93	
8	1	Laura Müller	Germany	23.08	
