= 2019 European Athletics U23 Championships – Women's 4 × 400 metres relay =

The women's 4 × 400 metres relay event at the 2019 European Athletics U23 Championships was held in Gävle, Sweden, at Gavlehov Stadium Park on 14 July.

== Results ==
Rank	Nation	Athletes	Time	Notes
1st place, gold medalist(s)	Poland	Karolina Łozowska, Natalia Wosztyl, Natalia Widawska, Natalia Kaczmarek	3:32.56	
2nd place, silver medalist(s)	Great Britain	Lily Beckford, Finette Agyapong, Yasmin Liverpool, Hannah Williams	3:32.91	
3rd place, bronze medalist(s)	Germany	Nelly Schmidt, Corinna Schwab, Alica Schmidt, Luna Bulmahn	3:33.83	
4	Ukraine	Yana Kachur, Natalya Pyrozhenko-Chornomaz, Ivanna Avramchuk, Anastasiya Bryzhina	3:34.33	
5	Italy	Alice Mangione, Anna Polinari, Aurora Casagrande Montesi, Rebecca Borga	3:36.96	
6	Slovakia	Michaela Pešková, Gabriela Gajanová, Simona Malatincová, Miriam Cidoríková	3:46.26	
	France	Diana Iscaye, Lena Kandissounon, Laurine Xailly, Kalyl Amaro	DQ	R163.3
