= 2017 European Athletics U23 Championships – Women's 200 metres =

The women's 200 metres event at the 2017 European Athletics U23 Championships was held in Bydgoszcz, Poland, at Zdzisław Krzyszkowiak Stadium on 14 and 15 July.

== Medalists ==
Gold	Finette Agyapong; Great Britain
Silver	Sarah Atcho; Switzerland
Bronze	Yana Kachur; Ukraine

== Records ==
Prior to the competition, the records were as follows:

European U23 record	Heike Drechsler (GDR)	21.71	Jena, East Germany	29 June 1986
Championship U23 record	Hana Benešová (CZE)	22.57	Turku, Finland	13 July 1997

== Results ==
=== Heats ===
14 July

Qualification rule: First 3 (Q) and the next 4 fastest (q) qualified for the semifinals.

Wind:
Heat 1: +0.4 m/s, Heat 2: +0.7 m/s, Heat 3: +0.5 m/s, Heat 4: +1.1 m/s

Rank	Heat	Name	Nationality	Time	Notes
1	4	Sarah Atcho	Switzerland	22.96	Q
2	4	Finette Agyapong	Great Britain	23.04	Q, PB
3	1	Yana Kachur	Ukraine	23.28	Q, PB
4	1	Ama Pipi	Great Britain	23.37	Q
5	3	Marcela Pírková	Czech Republic	23.42	Q
6	2	Sindija Bukša	Latvia	23.43	Q, PB
7	1	Fanny Peltier	France	23.48	Q
8	3	Maroussia Paré	France	23.56	Q, SB
9	2	Krystsina Tsimanouskaya	Belarus	23.56	Q
10	2	Cristina Lara	Spain	23.68	Q
11	3	Alina Kalistratova	Ukraine	23.74	Q
12	4	Amandine Brossier	France	23.82	Q
13	3	Alessia Niotta	Italy	23.85	q
14	1	Johanelis Herrera Abreu	Italy	23.86	q, SB
15	4	Ane Petrirena	Spain	23.90	q
16	2	Annalisa Spadotto Scott	Italy	23.92	q
17	1	Martina Hofmanová	Czech Republic	23.95	
18	3	Cliodhna Manning	Ireland	24.13	
19	3	Melinda Ferenczi	Hungary	24.17	
20	2	Zorana Barjaktarović	Serbia	24.20	
21	1	Susanne Walli	Austria	24.21	
22	2	Alexandra Toth	Austria	24.25	=SB
23	4	Õilme Võro	Estonia	24.36	
24	4	Savannah Mapalagama	Austria	24.49	
25	1	Olivia Fotopoulou	Cyprus	24.50	
26	4	Diana Podoleanu	Moldova	24.55	
27	1	Anna Paula Auziņa	Latvia	24.62	SB
28	4	Zakiyya Hasanova	Azerbaijan	24.84	
29	2	Zyanne Hook	Gibraltar	26.70	
	3	Sara Dorthea Jensen	Norway	DNS	
	3	Laura Müller	Germany	DNS	

=== Semifinals ===
15 July

Qualification rule: First 3 (Q) and the next 2 fastest (q) qualified for the final.

Wind:
Heat 1: +1.3 m/s, Heat 2: +0.7 m/s

Rank	Heat	Name	Nationality	Time	Notes
1	1	Finette Agyapong	Great Britain	22.86	Q, PB
2	1	Sarah Atcho	Switzerland	22.99	Q
3	1	Sindija Bukša	Latvia	23.12	Q, NU23R
4	1	Fanny Peltier	France	23.13	q, PB
5	2	Yana Kachur	Ukraine	23.21	Q, PB
6	2	Ama Pipi	Great Britain	23.26	Q
7	2	Maroussia Paré	France	23.26	Q, PB
8	1	Krystsina Tsimanouskaya	Belarus	23.41	q
9	1	Alina Kalistratova	Ukraine	23.53	
10	2	Marcela Pírková	Czech Republic	23.54	
11	2	Cristina Lara	Spain	23.57	
12	2	Johanelis Herrera Abreu	Italy	23.66	PB
13	1	Alessia Niotta	Italy	23.90	
14	2	Amandine Brossier	France	23.91	
15	2	Annalisa Spadotto Scott	Italy	23.91	
16	1	Ane Petrirena	Spain	24.01	

=== Final ===
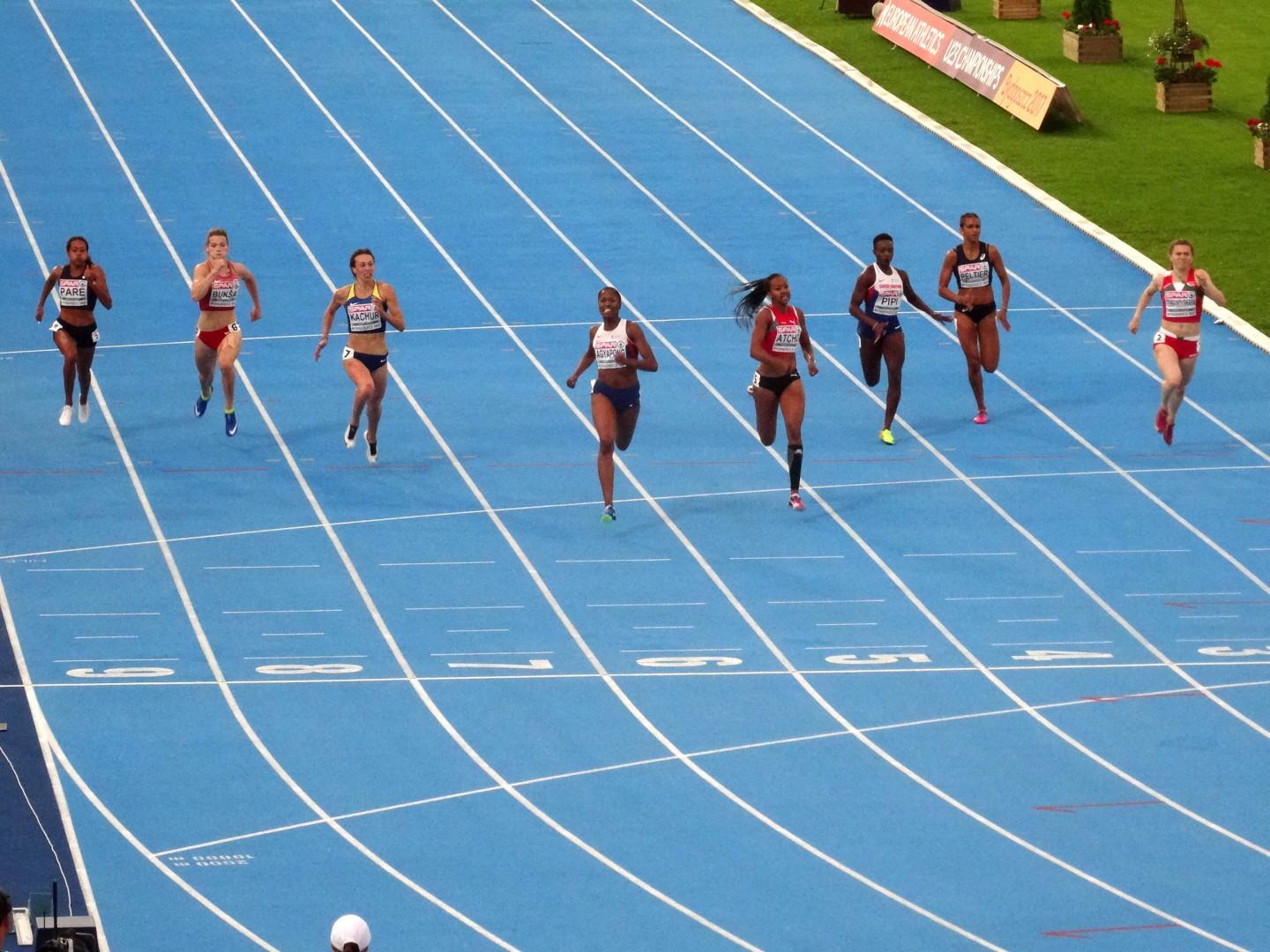
The final

15 July

Wind: +1.3 m/s

Rank	Lane	Name	Nationality	Time	Notes
1st place, gold medalist(s)	6	Finette Agyapong	Great Britain	22.87	
2nd place, silver medalist(s)	5	Sarah Atcho	Switzerland	22.90	PB
3rd place, bronze medalist(s)	7	Yana Kachur	Ukraine	23.20	PB
4	2	Krystsina Tsimanouskaya	Belarus	23.32	
5	4	Ama Pipi	Great Britain	23.41	
6	8	Sindija Bukša	Latvia	23.41	PB
7	9	Maroussia Paré	France	23.53	SB
8	3	Fanny Peltier	France	23.59	
