= Martyna Kotwiła =

Polish sprinter

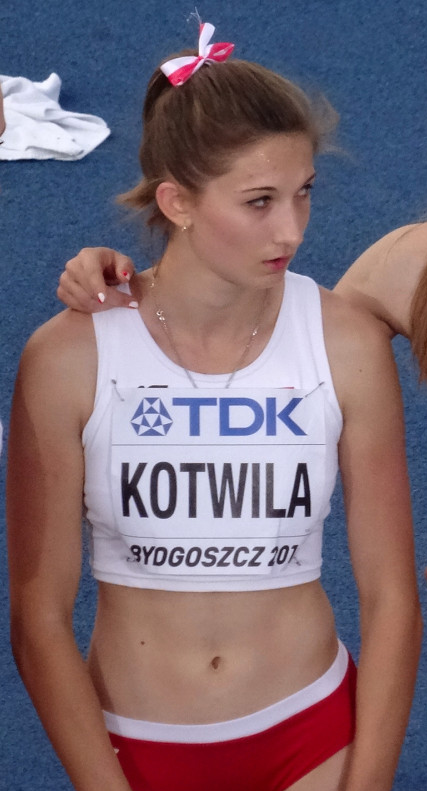
- Martyna Kotwiła in 2016

Personal information
- Born: 13 January 1999 (age 27) Radom, Poland
- Height: 1.69 m (5 ft 7 in)
- Weight: 55 kg (121 lb)

Sport
- Sport: Athletics
- Event(s): 100 m, 200 m
- Club: RLTL ZTE Radom
- Coached by: Bożena Jadczak
Medal record
Athletics
Representing Poland
European Championships
| Silver medal – second place | 2022 Munich | 4 × 100 m |
European U23 Championships
| Bronze medal – third place | 2019 Gävle | 4 x 100 m |

Martyna Kotwiła (born 13 January 1999) is a Polish sprinter. She won a bronze medal at the 2018 World U20 Championships. In 2018, she ran 22.99 in the 200 metres breaking the long-standing Polish junior record previously held by Irena Kirszenstein. Kotwiła also competed for Poland at the 2024 Summer Olympics.

== International competitions ==
| Year | Competition | Venue | Position | Event | Notes |
Representing Poland
| 2016 | European Youth Championships | Tbilisi, Georgia | 12th (sf) | 100 m | 12.00 |
| 2016 | European Youth Championships | Tbilisi, Georgia | 5th | Medley relay | 2:08.57 |
| 2016 | World U20 Championships | Bydgoszcz, Poland | 4th | 4 × 100 m relay | 44.81 |
| 2017 | European U20 Championships | Grosseto, Italy | 7th | 200 m | 24.14 |
| 2017 | European U20 Championships | Grosseto, Italy | 10th (h) | 4 × 100 m relay | 45.27 |
| 2018 | World U20 Championships | Tampere, Finland | 3rd | 200 m | 23.21 |
| 2018 | World U20 Championships | Tampere, Finland | 5th | 4 × 100 m relay | 44.61 |
| 2018 | European Championships | Berlin, Germany | 16th (sf) | 200 m | 23.41 |
| 2018 | European Championships | Berlin, Germany | 6th | 4 × 100 m relay | 43.34 |
| 2019 | European U23 Championships | Gävle, Sweden | 7th (sf) | 200 m | 23.86^{1} |
| 2019 | European U23 Championships | Gävle, Sweden | 3rd | 4 × 100 m relay | 44.08 |
| 2022 | World Championships | Eugene, United States | 11th (h) | 4 × 100 m relay | 43.19 |
| 2022 | European Championships | Munich, Germany | 6th (h) | 4 × 100 m relay | 43.49 |
| 2023 | European Indoor Championships | Istanbul, Turkey | 16th (sf) | 60 m | 7.33 |
| 2023 | World Championships | Budapest, Hungary | 31st (h) | 200 m | 23.34 |
| 2024 | European Championships | Rome, Italy | 23rd (sf) | 200 m | 23.44 |
| 2024 | Olympic Games | Paris, France | 20th (rep) | 200 m | 23.50 |

^{1}Did not finish in the semifinals

== Personal bests ==
Outdoor

- 100 metres – 11.37 (0.0 m/s, Chorzow 2023)
- 200 metres – 22.99 (+2.0 m/s, Lublin 2018)

Indoor

- 60 metres – 7.28 (Toruń 2023)
- 200 metres – 23.30 (Toruń 2023)
