= 2016 IAAF World U20 Championships – Women's 200 metres =

The women's 200 metres event at the 2016 IAAF World U20 Championships was held at Zdzisław Krzyszkowiak Stadium on 22 and 23 July.

== Medalists ==
Gold	Edidiong Odiong; Bahrain
Silver	Evelyn Rivera; Colombia
Bronze	Estelle Raffai; France

== Records ==
Standing records prior to the 2016 IAAF World U20 Championships in Athletics
World Junior Record	Allyson Felix (USA)	22.18	Athens, Greece	25 August 2004
Championship Record	Anthonique Strachan (BAH)	22.53	Barcelona, Spain	13 July 2012
World Junior Leading	Sada Williams (BAR)	22.61	Bridgetown, Barbados	18 March 2016

== Results ==
=== Heats ===
Qualification: First 4 of each heat (Q) and the 4 fastest times (q) qualified for the semifinals.

Wind:
Heat 1: +0.6 m/s, Heat 2: +1.9 m/s, Heat 3: +1.2 m/s, Heat 4: +1.1 m/s, Heat 5: +0.5 m/s

Rank	Heat	Name	Nationality	Time	Note
1	2	Edidiong Odiong	Bahrain	23.06	Q
2	3	Sada Williams	Barbados	23.38	Q
3	4	Jenae Ambrose	Bahamas	23.45	Q
4	3	Estelle Raffai	France	23.52	Q, PB
5	4	Finette Agyapong	Great Britain	23.58	Q
6	3	Ashlan Best	Canada	23.61	Q, PB
7	1	Evelyn Rivera	Colombia	23.66	Q
8	5	Tasa Jiya	Netherlands	23.67	Q
9	2	Cynthia Leduc	France	23.75	Q
10	5	Maddison Coates	Australia	23.78	Q, SB
11	5	Eleni Frommann	Germany	23.79	Q
12	4	Taylor Bennett	United States	23.82	Q
13	3	Charlotte McLennaghan	Great Britain	23.89	Q
14	5	Mercy Ntia-Obong	Nigeria	23.91	Q
15	2	Helene Rønningen	Norway	23.92	Q
16	5	Carina Pölzl	Austria	23.93	q
~~17~~	5	Basirah Sharifa Nasir	Bahrain	~~23.96~~	q, DQ
17	4	Georgia Hulls	New Zealand	23.99	Q
18	2	Zion Corrales-Nelson	Philippines	24.00	Q, PB
19	4	Roneisha McGregor	Jamaica	24.10	q, PB
20	2	Tamzin Thomas	South Africa	24.11	q
21	3	Olivia Eaton	New Zealand	24.13	
22	2	Sofia Bonicalza	Italy	24.14	
23	1	Shanice Reid	Jamaica	24.18	Q
24	1	Andrea Bouma	Netherlands	24.19	Q
25	1	Sindija Bukša	Latvia	24.22	Q
26	4	Lara Gómez	Spain	24.23	
27	1	Kayla Anise Richardson	Philippines	24.29	
28	2	Cecilia Tamayo	Mexico	24.39	
29	4	Myia Dorsey	United States Virgin Islands	24.50	
30	4	Jusztina Csóti	Hungary	24.55	
31	2	Akia Guerrier	Turks and Caicos Islands	25.16	
32	3	Aliya Boshnak	Jordan	25.66	NU20R
33	1	Mariam Mamdouh Farid	Qatar	30.25	
34	1	Jayla Kirkland	United States	53.07	
	1	Sharlene Mawdsley	Ireland	DQ	R163.3(a)
	3	Aniekeme Alphonsus	Nigeria	DNS	
	3	Devine Parker	Bahamas	DNS	
	5	Diana Vaisman	Israel	DNS	
	5	Khalifa St. Fort	Trinidad and Tobago	DNS	

=== Semifinals ===
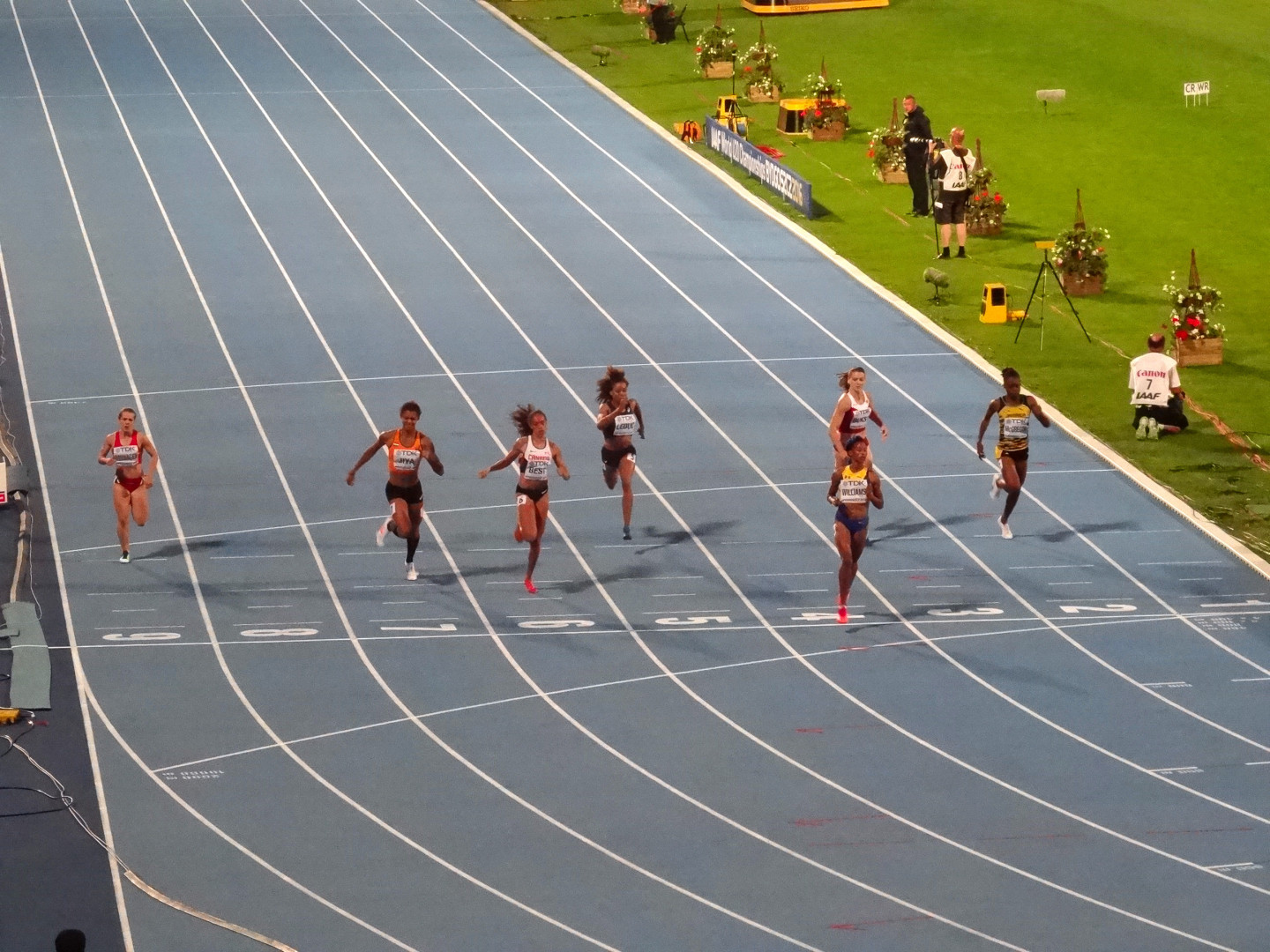
Semifinal 1

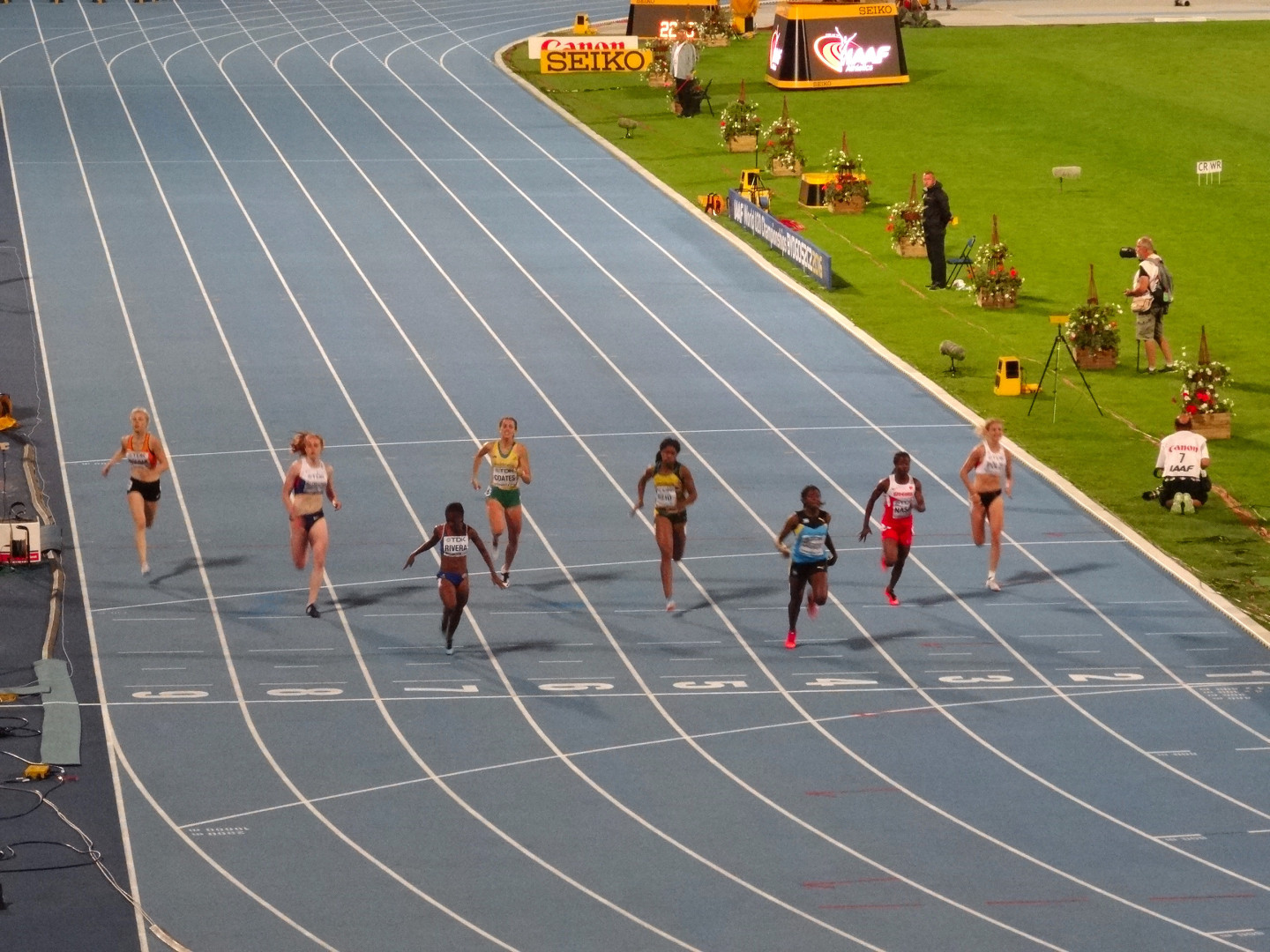
Semifinal 2

Qualification: First 2 of each heat (Q) and the 2 fastest times (q) qualified for the final.

Wind:
Heat 1: +0.1 m/s, Heat 2: +1.0 m/s, Heat 3: +0.6 m/s

Rank	Heat	Name	Nationality	Time	Note
1	3	Edidiong Odiong	Bahrain	23.19	Q
2	1	Sada Williams	Barbados	23.35	Q
3	2	Jenae Ambrose	Bahamas	23.44	Q
4	2	Evelyn Rivera	Colombia	23.45	Q
5	3	Estelle Raffai	France	23.45	Q, PB
6	3	Taylor Bennett	United States	23.49	q
7	3	Finette Agyapong	Great Britain	23.64	q
8	1	Ashlan Best	Canada	23.66	Q
9	1	Tasa Jiya	Netherlands	23.72	
~~10~~	2	Basirah Sharifa Nasir	Bahrain	~~23.77~~	DQ
10	2	Shanice Reid	Jamaica	23.85	SB
11	2	Charlotte McLennaghan	Great Britain	23.87	
12	1	Roneisha McGregor	Jamaica	23.94	PB
13	2	Carina Pölzl	Austria	23.96	
14	2	Maddison Coates	Australia	23.96	
15	1	Sindija Bukša	Latvia	23.99	PB
16	1	Cynthia Leduc	France	24.02	
17	1	Helene Rønningen	Norway	24.04	
18	3	Zion Corrales-Nelson	Philippines	24.05	
19	3	Georgia Hulls	New Zealand	24.06	
20	2	Andrea Bouma	Netherlands	24.19	
21	3	Eleni Frommann	Germany	24.22	
22	3	Tamzin Thomas	South Africa	24.49	
	1	Mercy Ntia-Obong	Nigeria	DNS	

=== Final ===
Wind: +0.6 m/s

Rank	Lane	Name	Nationality	Time	Note
1st place, gold medalist(s)	5	Edidiong Ofonime Odiong	Bahrain	22.84	
2nd place, silver medalist(s)	7	Evelyn Rivera	Colombia	23.21	PB
3rd place, bronze medalist(s)	9	Estelle Raffai	France	23.48	
4	4	Jenae Ambrose	Bahamas	23.53	
5	3	Taylor Bennett	United States	23.55	
6	8	Ashlan Best	Canada	23.68	
7	2	Finette Agyapong	Great Britain	23.74	
	6	Sada Williams	Barbados	DNF	
