= Krystsina Tsimanouskaya =

Belarusian-born Polish sprinter (born 1996)

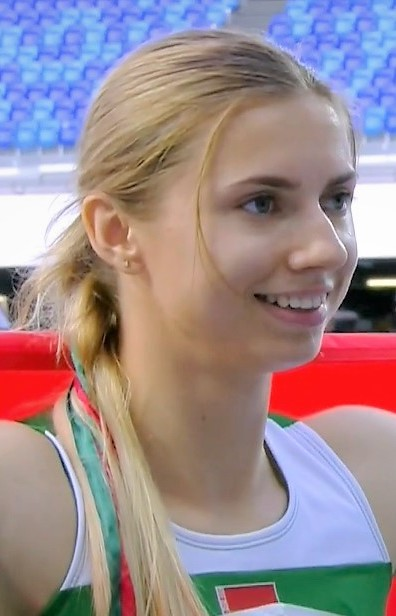
- Tsimanouskaya in July 2019

Personal information
- Full name: Krystsina Siarheyeuna Tsimanouskaya
- Born: 19 November 1996 (age 29) Klimavichy, Belarus
- Height: 168 cm (5 ft 6 in)
- Weight: 61.5 kg (136 lb)

Sport
- Sport: Athletics
- Events: 100 m, 200 m
- Club: BFST Dynamo
Medal record
Representing Belarus
European Games
Silver medal – second place	2019 Minsk	team event
Silver medal – second place	2019 Minsk	100 metres
Summer Universiade
Gold medal – first place	2019 Naples	200 metres
European Athletics U23 Championships
Silver medal – second place	2017 Bydgoszcz	100 metres
Representing Poland
European Championships
Bronze medal – third place	2026 Birmingham	4 × 100 m relay
Polish Indoor Athletics Championships
Silver medal – second place	2023 Toruń	60 metres

Krystsina Siarheyeuna Tsimanouskaya (Note: Belarusian: Крысціна Сяргееўна Ціманоўская, romanized: Krystsina Syarhyeyewna Tsimanowskaya, pronounced [krɨsʲˈt͡sʲina sʲarˈɣʲɛjɛwna t͡sʲimaˈnɔwskaja]; Polish: Kryscina Cimanouska; Russian: Кристи́на Серге́евна Тимано́вская, romanized: Kristina Sergeyevna Timanovskaya.) (born 19 November 1996) is a Polish and former Belarusian sprinter. She has won numerous medals at various events, including a silver medal in the 100 metres at the 2017 European U23 Championships, a gold medal in the 200 metres at the 2019 Summer Universiade, a silver medal in the team event at the 2019 European Games and a bronze medal in the 4 × 100 m relay at the 2026 European Championships.

Tsimanouskaya qualified to represent Belarus at the 2020 Summer Olympics in Tokyo, competing in the women's 100 m and 200 m events. On 30 July 2021, a scandal broke out during the Olympics when she accused officials from the Belarus Olympic Committee (BOC) of entering her into the 4 × 400 metres relay (a distance she had never contested) without her consent. BOC coaches withdrew her from the Olympics on 1 August and took her to Haneda Airport to return to Belarus, but she refused to board the plane and contacted Japanese authorities, who granted her police protection; she was given a humanitarian visa at the Polish embassy in Tokyo before flying to Poland, where she later gained Polish citizenship. In 2023, the World Athletics Nationality Review Panel waived the normal three-year waiting period for citizenship changes, allowing her to compete for Poland.

== Early life ==
Krystsina Siarheyeuna Tsimanouskaya was born in Klimavichy on 19 November 1996. Though she raced for fun as a child, she joined competitive athletics late, receiving an offer from an Olympic trainer to join his academy when she was about 15 years old. Her parents were initially worried, thinking she would not achieve an athletic career, but she and her grandmother convinced them.

== International competitions ==
Year	Competition	Venue	Position	Event	Notes
Representing Belarus
2015	European Junior Championships	Eskilstuna, Sweden	6	100 m	11.85
2015	European Junior Championships	Eskilstuna, Sweden	17 h	200 m	24.51
2017	European Indoor Championships	Belgrade, Serbia	12 sf	60 m	7.39
2017	European U23 Championships	Bydgoszcz, Poland	2	100 m	11.54
2017	European U23 Championships	Bydgoszcz, Poland	4	200 m	23.32
2018	World Indoor Championships	Birmingham, United Kingdom	31 h	60 m	7.37
2018	European Championships	Berlin, Germany	13 sf	100 m	11.34
2018	European Championships	Berlin, Germany	10 sf	200 m	23.03
2019	European Indoor Championships	Glasgow, United Kingdom	7	60 m	7.26
2019	Universiade	Naples, Italy	6	100 m	11.44
2019	Universiade	Naples, Italy	1	200 m	23.00
2019	World Championships	Doha, Qatar	26 h	200 m	23.22
2019	European Games	Minsk, Belarus	2	Team event (100 m)	11.24
2019	European Games	Minsk, Belarus	2	100 m	11.36
2021	European Indoor Championships	Toruń, Poland	–	60 m	DQ
2021	Olympic Games	Tokyo, Japan	38 h	100 m	11.47
2021	Olympic Games	Tokyo, Japan	–	200 m	DNC
Representing Poland
2023	World Championships	Budapest, Hungary	30th (h)	100 m	11.32
2023	World Championships	Budapest, Hungary	23rd (sf)	200 m	23.34
2023	World Championships	Budapest, Hungary	5th	4 × 100 m relay	42.66
2024	European Championships	Rome, Italy	19th (sf)	200 m	23.34
2024	European Championships	Rome, Italy	8th (h)	4 × 100 m relay	43.15^{1}
2024	Olympic Games	Paris, France	6th (rep)	200 m	23.01
2024	Olympic Games	Paris, France	12th (h)	4 × 100 m relay	42.86
2025	World Relays	Guangzhou, China	5th (rep)	4 × 100 m relay	43.38
2025	World Championships	Tokyo, Japan	8th (h)	4 × 100 m relay	42.83^{2}
2026	European Championships	Birmingham, United Kingdom	23rd (sf)	100 m	11.44
2026	European Championships	Birmingham, United Kingdom	3rd	4 × 100 m relay	43.15

^{1}Did not finish in the final
^{2}Disqualified in the final

=== Tokyo 2020 Olympics ===
Tsimanouskaya qualified for her first Olympics in the 100 m and 200 m events, representing Belarus. On 30 July 2021 (postponed from 2020 because of the COVID-19 pandemic), she finished 4th in the first round heat of the 100 m event with a time of 11.47. Prior to the 200 m event, Belarus Olympic Committee (NOC RB) officials withdrew her from the competition. On 2 August, the Court of Arbitration for Sport (CAS) rejected Tsimanouskaya's request to annul the decision of the NOC RB to stop her from participating at the Tokyo Olympics, stating that she was unable to prove her case. On 3 August, the CAS clarified that its judgement was based on the fact that Tsimanouskaya could not prove she would still attempt to compete at Tokyo while she was in the process of seeking asylum in other countries.

=== Forced repatriation scandal ===
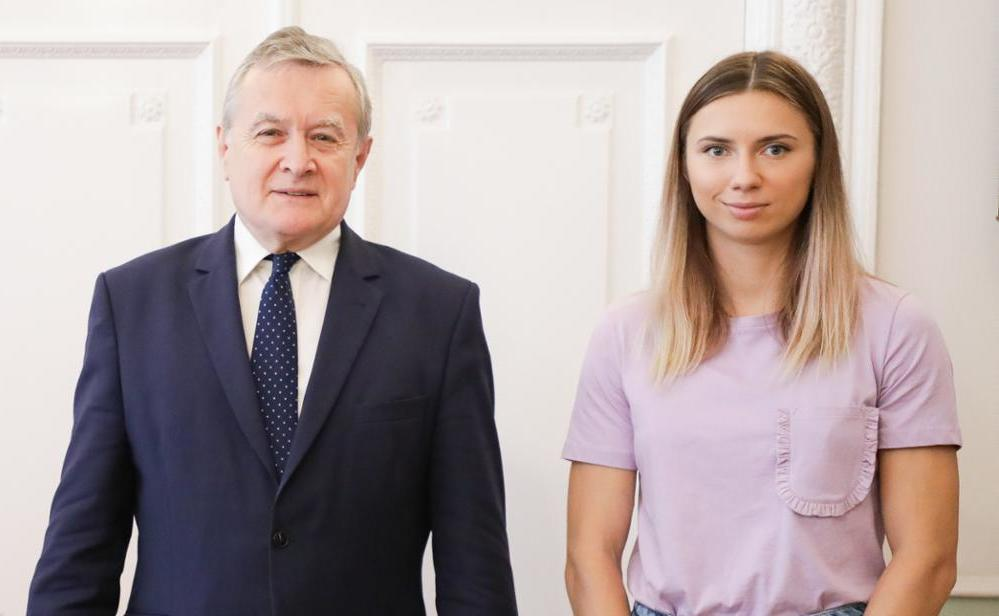
Tsimanouskaya with Piotr Gliński, Poland's Minister of Sport and Tourism, in August 2021

On 30 July 2021, Tsimanouskaya criticised Belarus Olympic Committee (BOC) officials in an Instagram video, claiming that they had entered her into the 4 × 400 m relay race (a distance she had never contested) without her consent. On 1 August, she was told by BOC officials that she was being withdrawn from competition, and would be taken to Tokyo's Haneda Airport to return to Belarus. After receiving a warning from her grandmother during a phone call, she refused to board the plane and contacted Japanese police and media outlets, telling them that she was afraid of returning to Belarus and that she intended to claim asylum. The Belarusian Sport Solidarity Foundation (BSSF), an organisation dedicated to protecting athletes, confirmed that an attempt had been made to forcibly return her to Belarus. She received Japanese police protection and was taken to the Polish embassy in Tokyo, where she was granted a humanitarian visa by Poland on 2 August.

Though multiple European countries offered her protection, Tsimanouskaya reportedly chose to seek asylum in Poland as the country had expressly offered her the opportunity to continue competing, and the IOC made contact with officials from the Polish Olympic Committee (PKOI) regarding the possibility of her resuming competition. On 4 August, she flew from Tokyo to Vienna Airport in Austria, where she briefly stayed in the airport under the protection of Austrian police; according to the BSSF, she connected in Austria instead of flying directly to Poland for security reasons on the advice of Polish authorities. She then flew to Warsaw Chopin Airport in Poland, where she was met by Polish officials and Belarusian expatriates. IOC President Thomas Bach and Japan's Foreign Ministry both gave statements on 6 August, describing the scandal as "deplorable" and "unjust". Tsimanouskaya received Polish citizenship in June 2022.

She competed for Poland at the 2024 Summer Olympics in the 200 m and 4 × 100 m relay events.

== Personal bests ==
Outdoor

- 100 metres – 11.04 (+0.7 m/s, Minsk 2018)
- 200 metres – 22.75 (+1,0 m/s Warsaw 2023)

Indoor

- 60 metres – 7.21 (Mogilyov 2017, Minsk 2019, Luxembourg 2024)
- 200 metres – 23.45 (Toruń 2023)
