= 2019 European Athletics Indoor Championships – Women's 60 metres =

The women's 60 metres event at the 2019 European Athletics Indoor Championships was held on 2 March 2019 at 11:13 (heats), at 18:50 (semifinals) and 20:35 (final) local time.

== Medalists ==
Gold	Silver	Bronze
Ewa Swoboda; Poland	Dafne Schippers; Netherlands	Asha Philip; Great Britain

== Records ==
Standing records prior to the 2019 European Athletics Indoor Championships
World record	Irina Privalova (RUS)	6.92	Madrid, Spain	11 February 1993
World record	Irina Privalova (RUS)	6.92	Madrid, Spain	9 February 1995
European record	Irina Privalova (RUS)	6.92	Madrid, Spain	11 February 1993
European record	Irina Privalova (RUS)	6.92	Madrid, Spain	9 February 1995
Championship record	Nelli Cooman (NED)	7.00	Madrid, Spain	23 February 1986
World Leading	Marie-Josée Ta Lou (CIV)	7.02	Düsseldorf, Germany	20 February 2019
European Leading	Ewa Swoboda (POL)	7.08	Karlsruhe, Germany	2 February 2019
European Leading	Mujinga Kambundji (SUI)	7.08	St. Gallen, Switzerland	16 February 2019

== Results ==
=== Heats ===
Qualification: The first 3 in each heat (Q) and the next 6 fastest (q) advance to the Semi-Finals.

Rank	Heat	Athlete	Nationality	Time	Note
1	2	Ewa Swoboda	Poland	7.14	Q
2	1	Asha Philip	Great Britain	7.23	Q
3	3	Rachel Miller	Great Britain	7.24	Q
4	6	Dafne Schippers	Netherlands	7.24	Q
5	6	Kristal Awuah	Great Britain	7.26	Q
6	4	Krystsina Tsimanouskaya	Belarus	7.27	Q
7	4	Ajla Del Ponte	Switzerland	7.27	Q
8	2	Ezinne Okparaebo	Norway	7.27	Q, =SB
9	1	Maja Mihalinec	Slovenia	7.28	Q, SB
10	5	Carolle Zahi	France	7.29	Q
11	3	Lisa Marie Kwayie	Germany	7.30	Q
12	5	Mujinga Kambundji	Switzerland	7.31	Q
13	5	Diana Vaisman	Israel	7.33	Q NR
14	6	Lorène Dorcas Bazolo	Portugal	7.33	Q
15	2	Alexandra Toth	Austria	7.33	Q
16	2	Jamile Samuel	Netherlands	7.34	q
17	5	Mathilde Kramer	Denmark	7.34	q =NR
18	1	Rebekka Haase	Germany	7.36	Q
19	6	Klaudia Sorok	Hungary	7.37	q, =PB
20	4	Irene Ekelund	Sweden	7.38	Q
21	3	Sarah Atcho	Switzerland	7.38	Q
22	5	Klára Seidlová	Czech Republic	7.39	q
23	1	Sindija Bukša	Latvia	7.39	Q
24	3	Estela García	Spain	7.40	q
25	6	Helene Rønningen	Norway	7.41	=SB
26	1	Jaël Bestué	Spain	7.41	
27	5	Patricia van der Weken	Luxembourg	7.41	
28	3	Mizgin Ay	Turkey	7.42	
29	6	Molly Scott	Ireland	7.43	
30	4	Marina Andreea Baboi	Romania	7.44	
31	6	Elin Östlund	Sweden	7.44	
32	2	Paula Sevilla	Spain	7.44	
33	3	Zakiyya Hasanova	Azerbaijan	7.45	
34	1	Nasrana Bacar	France	7.46	
35	4	Milana Tirnanić	Serbia	7.47	
36	2	Paraskevi Andreou	Cyprus	7.48	
37	4	Yana Kachur	Ukraine	7.52	
38	4	Akvile Andriukaityte	Lithuania	7.54	
39	3	Monika Weigertová	Slovakia	7.54	
40	5	Lauren Roy	Ireland	7.62	
41	3	Charlotte Wingfield	Malta	7.67	
42	6	Zyanne Hook	Gibraltar	8.49	
	2	Rafailía Spanoudáki-Hatziríga	Greece	DQ	R162.7

=== Semifinals ===
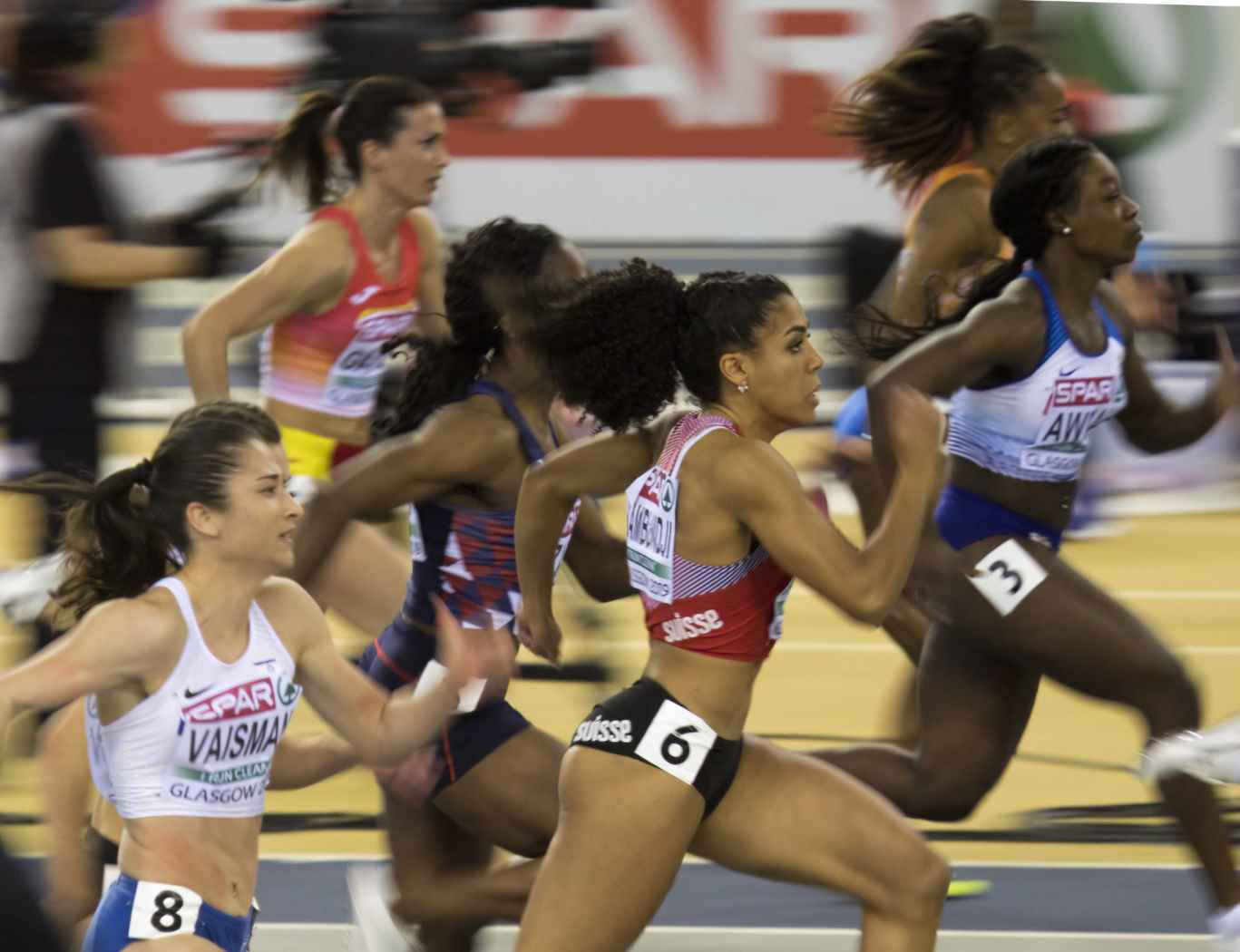
Semifinal 1

Qualification: Qualification: First 2 in each heat (Q) and the next 2 fastest (q) advance to the Final.

Rank	Heat	Athlete	Nationality	Time	Note
1	1	Ewa Swoboda	Poland	7.11	Q
2	3	Asha Philip	Great Britain	7.19	Q
3	2	Dafne Schippers	Netherlands	7.19	Q
4	1	Mujinga Kambundji	Switzerland	7.22	Q
5	1	Kristal Awuah	Great Britain	7.22	q
6	3	Ajla Del Ponte	Switzerland	7.25	Q
7	3	Krystsina Tsimanouskaya	Belarus	7.26	q
8	3	Lisa Marie Kwayie	Germany	7.29	
9	2	Maja Mihalinic	Slovenia	7.30	Q
10	1	Jamile Samuel	Netherlands	7.31	
11	1	Diana Vaisman	Israel	7.32	NR
12	2	Ezinne Okparaebo	Norway	7.32	
13	1	Carolle Zahi	France	7.35	
14	3	Lorene Dorcas Bazolo	Portugal	7.35	
14	1	Alexandra Toth	Austria	7.36	
16	2	Rachel Miller	Great Britain	7.37	
17	2	Rebekka Haase	Germany	7.37	
17	2	Klaudia Sorok	Hungary	7.39	
19	2	Sarah Atcho	Switzerland	7.41	
19	3	Irene Ekelund	Sweden	7.41	
21	2	Klára Seidlová	Czech Republic	7.41	
22	3	Sindija Bukša	Latvia	7.42	
23	3	Mathilde Kramer	Denmark	7.44	
24	1	Estela García	Spain	7.46	

=== Final ===
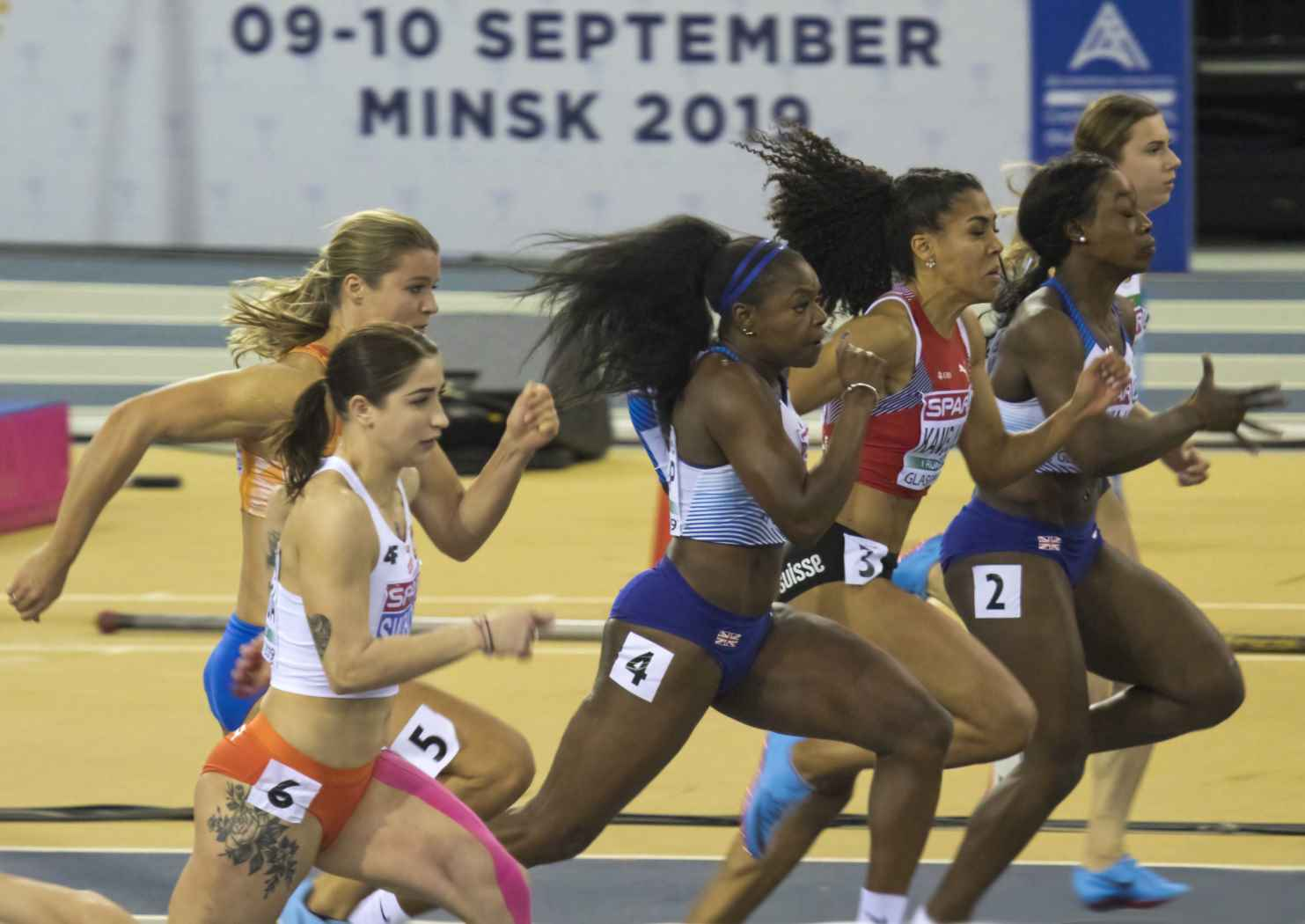
The final

Rank	Lane	Athlete	Nationality	Time	Note
1st place, gold medalist(s)	6	Ewa Swoboda	Poland	7.09	
2nd place, silver medalist(s)	5	Dafne Schippers	Netherlands	7.14	SB
3rd place, bronze medalist(s)	4	Asha Philip	Great Britain	7.15	
4	2	Kristal Awuah	Great Britain	7.15	PB
5	3	Mujinga Kambundji	Switzerland	7.16	
6	8	Maja Mihalinec	Slovenia	7.21	PB
7	1	Krystsina Tsimanouskaya	Belarus	7.26	
8	7	Ajla Del Ponte	Switzerland	7.30	
