= Sarah Richard =

French athlete (born 1998)

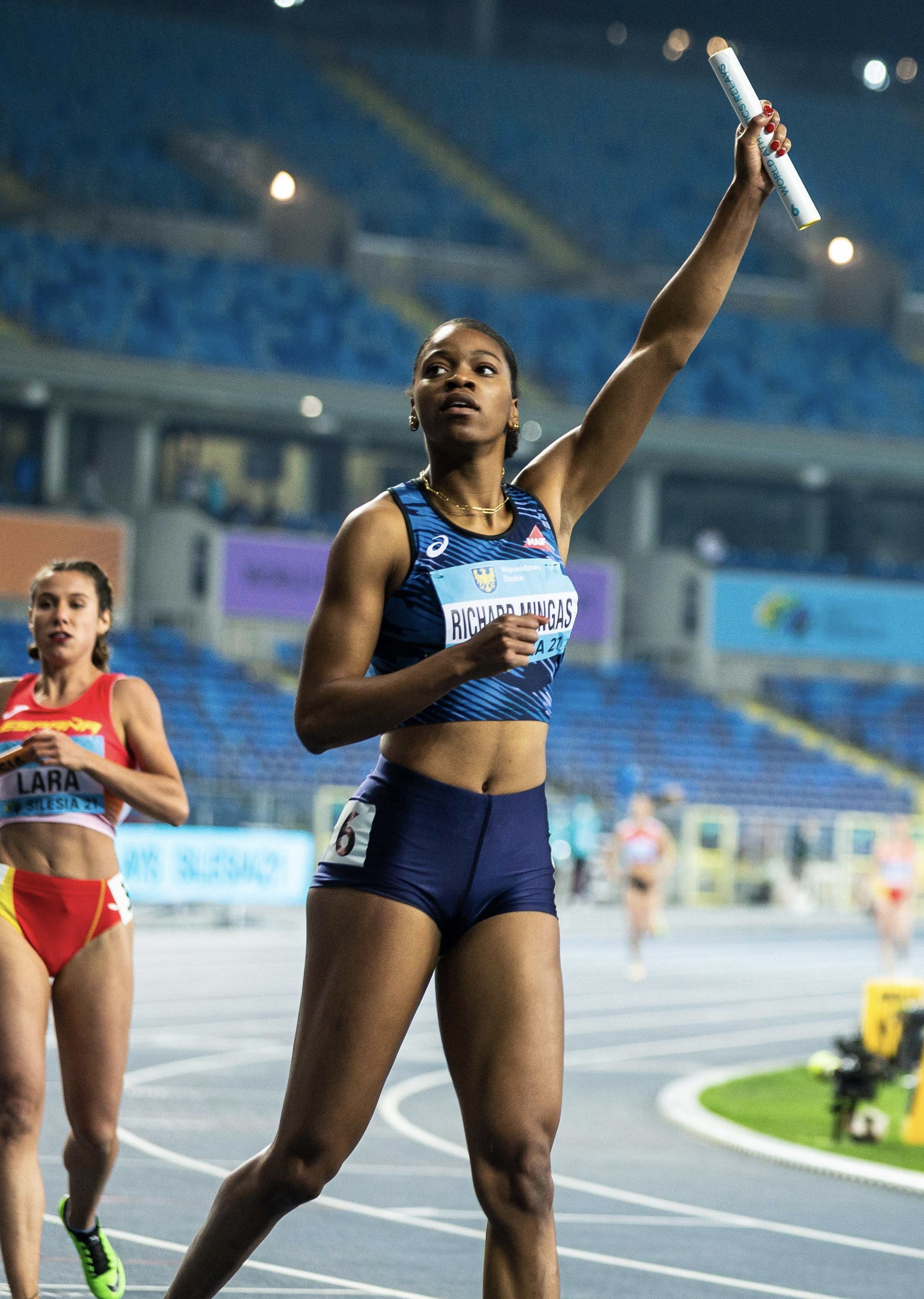
- World Relay 2020

Personal information
- Full name: Sarah Richard Mingas
- Born: 2 April 1998 (age 28) Nice, France
- Height: 182 cm (6 ft 0 in)
- Weight: 68 kg (150 lb)

Sport
- Country: France
- Sport: Athletics
- Event: Sprint

Achievements and titles
- Personal bests: 100 m: 11.35 (Montgeron, 2024); 200 m: 23.22 (Chateauroux, 2019)
Medal record
Women's athletics
Representing France
European Championships
Silver medal – second place	2024 Rome	4 × 100 m relay
European U23 Championships
Bronze medal – third place	2019 Gävle	200 m
Silver medal – second place	2019 Gävle	4 × 100 m relay
European U20 Championships
Silver medal – second place	2017 Grosseto	4 × 100 m relay

Sarah Richard Mingas (born 2 April 1998) is a French sprinter. She was French national champion in the 200 metres in 2019. She won the silver medal with the French 4 × 100 metres relay team at the 2024 European Athletics Championships.

== Biography ==
She was a silver medalist in the 4 × 100 m relay at the 2017 European Athletics U20 Championships in Grosseto, Italy in July 2017. She won French junior titles in 2018 in both the 100 metres and the 200 metres.

On 19 March 2019, she was named in the French team for the 2019 World Athletics Relays in Yokohama, Japan in May 2019. She was a bronze medalist in the 200 metres at the 2019 European Athletics U23 Championships in Gävle, Sweden. At the same championships, she won a silver medal in the 4 × 100 m relay. She became French national champion in the 200 metres in 2019 at the French Athletics Championships in St Etienne.

In May 2024, she set a new personal best for the 100 metres, running 11.35 seconds in Montgeron. She won silver with the French 4 × 100 m relay team at the 2024 European Athletics Championships in Rome, Italy. In July 2024, she ran as part of the French relay team at the 2024 London Athletics Meet, part of the 2024 Diamond League.

She competed at the 2025 World Athletics Relays in China in the Women's 4 × 100 metres relay in May 2025. In September 2025, she competed as the French team placed sixth overall in the women's 4 × 100 metres at the 2025 World Championships in Tokyo, Japan.

In May 2026, she ran at the 2026 World Athletics Relays in the women's 4 × 100 metres relay in Gaborone, Botswana. On 25 July 2026, she placed second in the 100 metres at the 2026 French Championships.

== Personal life ==
She is from Goussainville, Val-d'Oise. She is a member of Le Centre de Ressources, d'Expertise et de Performance Sportive (CREPS) in Poitiers, France and in 2024 was studying for a bachelors degree at the EDHEC Business School.
