= Dafne Schippers =

Dutch track and field athlete (born 1992)

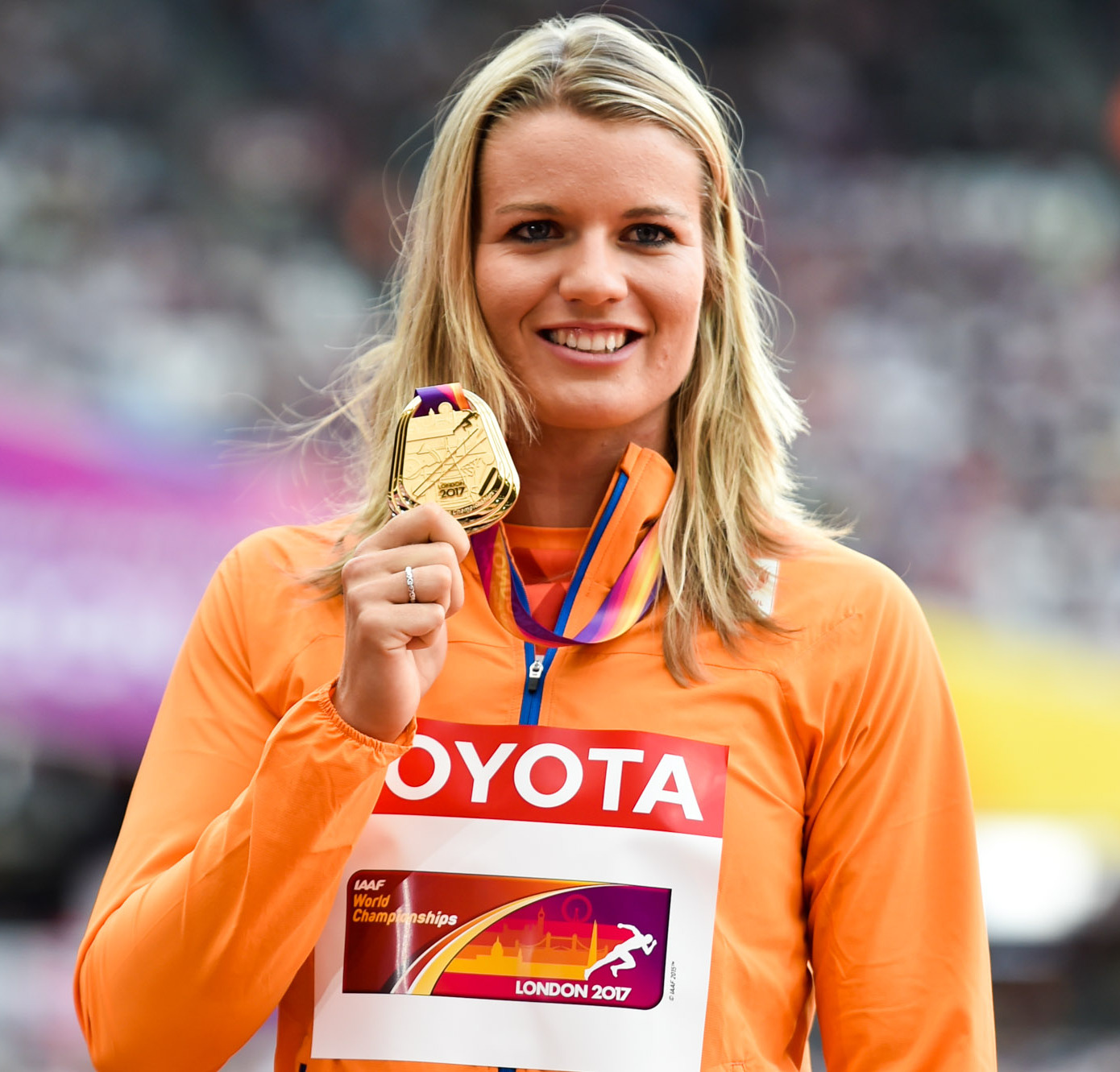
- Dafne Schippers with her gold 200 m medal at the 2017 World Championships in London

Personal information
- Born: 15 June 1992 (age 34) Utrecht, Netherlands
- Height: 1.79 m (5 ft 10 in)
- Weight: 70 kg (154 lb)
- Website: DafneSchippers.com

Sport
- Sport: Track and field
- Events: 60 m, 100 m, 200 m, 4 × 100 m relay, long jump, heptathlon
- Retired: 2023

Achievements and titles
- Personal bests: 100 m: 10.81 s (2015, NR); 200 m: 21.63 s (2015, AR); Long jump: 6.78 m (2014); Heptathlon: 6545 pts (2014); Indoors; 60 m: 7.00 s i (2016, =NR)
Medal record
Women's athletics
Representing the Netherlands
Event	1st	2nd	3rd
Olympic Games	0	1	0
World Championships	2	1	2
World Indoor Championships	0	1	0
European Championships	4	3	1
European Indoor Championships	1	1	0
Total	7	7	3
Event	1st	2nd	3rd
60 m	1	2	0
100 m	3	1	2
200 m	3	3	0
4 × 100 m relay	1	2	1
Heptathlon	2	0	1
Long jump	0	0	1
Olympic Games
Silver medal – second place	2016 Rio de Janeiro	200 m
World Championships
Gold medal – first place	2015 Beijing	200 m
Gold medal – first place	2017 London	200 m
Silver medal – second place	2015 Beijing	100 m
Bronze medal – third place	2013 Moscow	Heptathlon
Bronze medal – third place	2017 London	100 m
World Indoor Championships
Silver medal – second place	2016 Portland	60 m
World Relays
Bronze medal – third place	2021 Chorzów	4 × 100 m relay
Diamond League
First place	2016	200 m
European Championships
Gold medal – first place	2014 Zurich	100 m
Gold medal – first place	2014 Zurich	200 m
Gold medal – first place	2016 Amsterdam	100 m
Gold medal – first place	2016 Amsterdam	4 × 100 m relay
Silver medal – second place	2012 Helsinki	4 × 100 m relay
Silver medal – second place	2018 Berlin	200 m
Silver medal – second place	2018 Berlin	4 × 100 m relay
Bronze medal – third place	2018 Berlin	100 m
European Indoor Championships
Gold medal – first place	2015 Prague	60 m
Silver medal – second place	2019 Glasgow	60 m
European U23 Championships
Gold medal – first place	2013 Tampere	100 m
Bronze medal – third place	2013 Tampere	Long jump
World Junior Championships
Gold medal – first place	2010 Moncton	Heptathlon
Bronze medal – third place	2010 Moncton	4 × 100 m relay
European Junior Championships
Gold medal – first place	2011 Tallinn	Heptathlon
Representing Europe
Continental Cup
Gold medal – first place	2014 Marrakesh	200 m
Silver medal – second place	2018 Ostrava	200 m
Bronze medal – third place	2014 Marrakesh	100 m

Dafne Schippers (pronounced [ˈdɑfnə] [ˈsxɪpərs]; born 15 June 1992) is a Dutch retired track and field athlete who competed in sprinting and the combined events. She holds the European record in the 200 metres with a time of 21.63 seconds, making her the sixth-fastest woman of all time at this distance. She also holds the Dutch records in the 100 metres and long jump, and shares the Dutch records in the 60 metres indoor and 4 × 100 metres relay.

Schippers was the 200 m world champion at both the 2015 and the 2017 World Athletics Championships, the silver medalist in the 200 m at the 2016 Rio Olympics and the 200 m champion in the 2016 Diamond League. Additionally, she won two silver and two bronze medals at world championships—heptathlon bronze in 2013; 100 m silver in 2015; indoor 60 m silver in 2016, and 100 m bronze in 2017—and five (outdoor and indoor) European titles. She won twenty-two Dutch titles (outdoor and indoor).

She was European Athlete of the Year in 2014 and 2015.

In 2023, Schippers announced her retirement as a professional athlete.

== Early life ==
Dafne Schippers was born on 15 June 1992 in Utrecht, the Netherlands.

She started competing in athletics at the age of nine at the track and field club Hellas in Utrecht.

== Career ==
=== Heptathlon ===
Schippers originally competed in the heptathlon and won gold medals at the 2010 World Junior Championships in Athletics and 2011 European Athletics Junior Championships. At the 2010 World Junior Championships she also won a bronze in the 4 × 100 metres relay with her teammates Loreanne Kuhurima, Eva Lubbers and Jamile Samuel.

In 2011 at the World Championships in Daegu, South Korea, Schippers broke the Dutch national record in the 200 m in the heats in 22.69, before finishing ninth in the semifinals, missing the final by 0.04 seconds. The 4 × 100 metres relay team (Kadene Vassell, Schippers, Anouk Hagen and Samuel) were eliminated in the heats in a national record of 43.44 seconds.

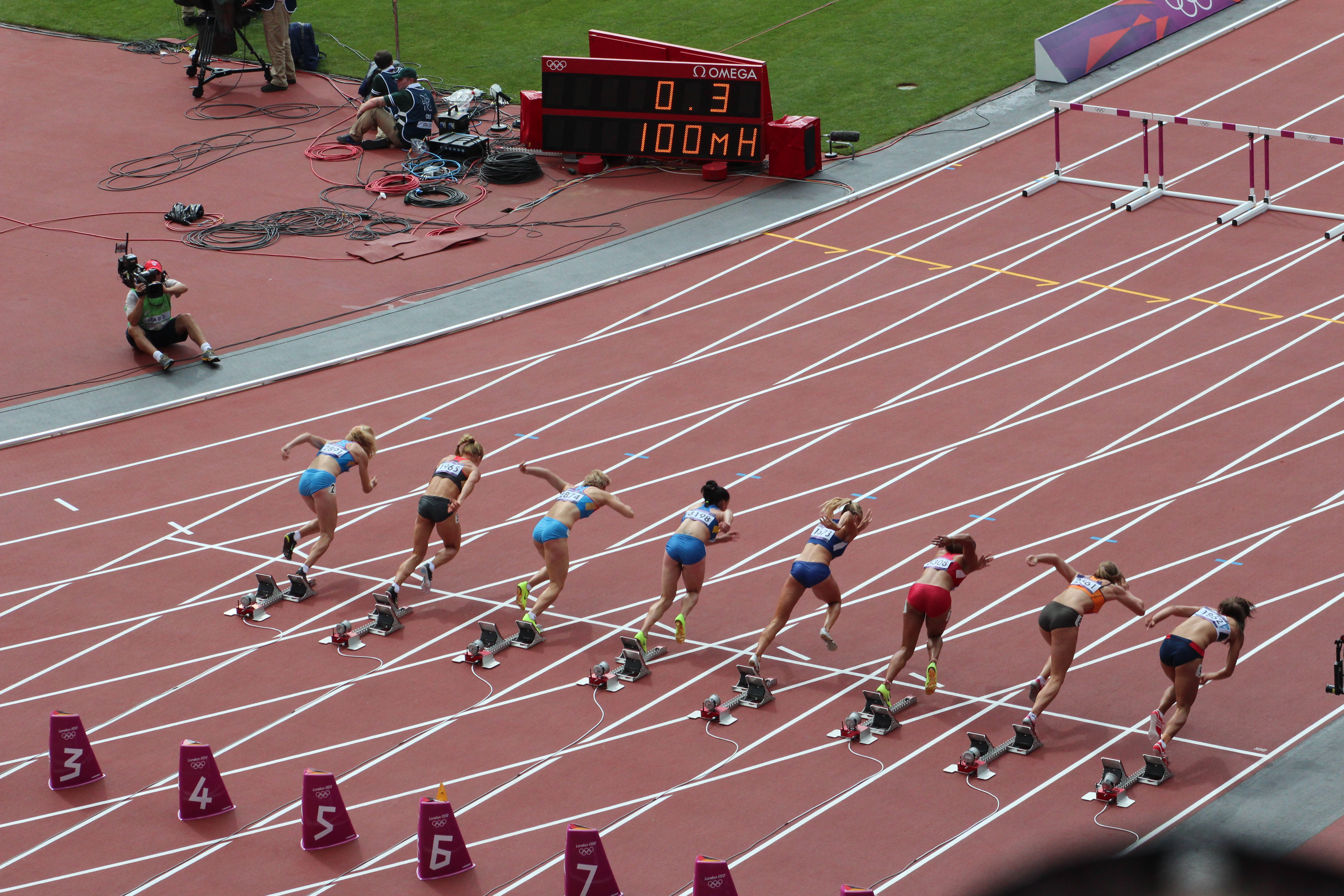
Schippers in lane 8 during the 100 metres hurdles of the heptathlon at the 2012 London Olympics

In 2012, Schippers was invited to participate in the prestigious heptathlon Hypo-Meeting in Götzis, Austria, where she finished fifth. She also competed at the 2012 European Athletics Championships in Helsinki, Finland, finishing fifth at the 200 metres. The race was disappointing after she had won her heat in 23.01 s and recorded the fastest semi-final time of 22.70 s. The Dutch 4 × 100 m relay team (Kadene Vassell, Schippers, Eva Lubbers and Samuel) were second in 42.80 s, a national record, behind the German team.

A year later, she started with third place at the Hypo-Meeting, with 6287 points. Next, she won gold in the 100 m and bronze in the long jump at the 2013 European Athletics U23 Championships. At the subsequent 2013 World Championships in Moscow, Schippers won the bronze medal in the heptathlon, collapsing over the line after taking a massive seven seconds off her personal best in the 800 metres to see off Briton Katarina Johnson-Thompson and Germany's Claudia Rath for the bronze. She became the first Dutch woman to win a medal in the heptathlon at the World Athletics Championships.

Schippers improved the 200 m record during the heptathlon at the 2014 Hypo-Meeting in Götzis, her time of 22.35 s being one of the best 200 m performances ever in a heptathlon. She finished third at the hepthatlon with 6545 points, a new national record. At the European championships of 2014, Schippers won gold medals in the 100 m and the 200 m. The 4 × 100 m relay team, one of the favourites for the title, did not finish in the final due to a botched first baton change.

=== Shifting to sprinting ===
Her success at the 2014 European Athletics Championships prompted discussion over her long-term prospects and whether she should focus on sprinting, or continue her career in the heptathlon. In June 2015, Schippers announced via Twitter that she would focus on sprinting in the run-up to the 2015 World Championships in Athletics in Beijing, China and the 2016 Summer Olympics in Rio de Janeiro (Brazil).

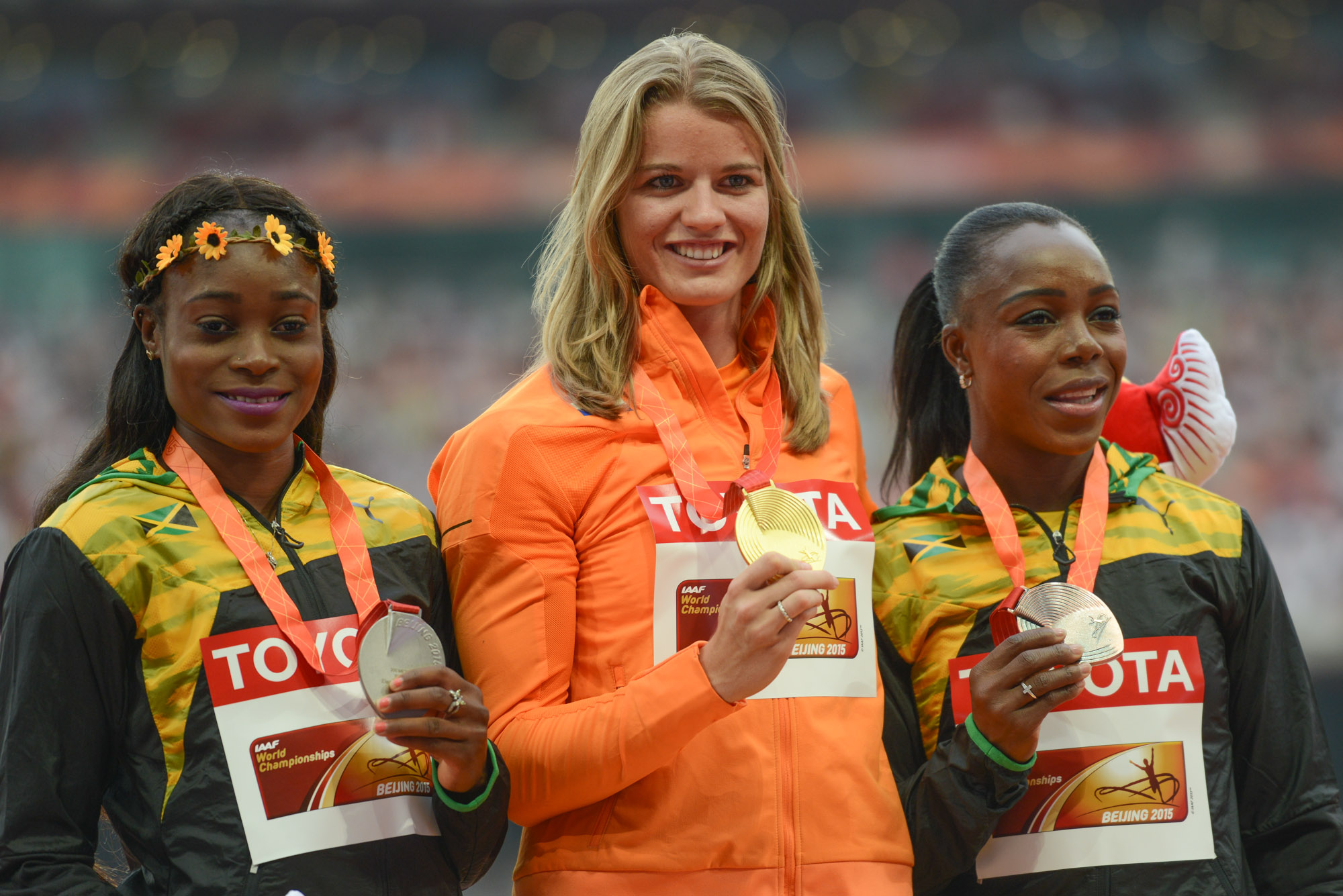
Schippers won her first senior world title with a 200 m victory at the 2015 World Championships held in Beijing.

The 2015 season had started well with a win in the 60 m at the 2015 European Athletics Indoor Championships in Prague, Czechia. At the 2015 Beijing World Championships, Schippers won the silver medal in the 100 m and gold in the 200 m, just before Elaine Thompson. Her 200 m winning time of 21.63 seconds was a new European record and made her the third fastest woman in history over that distance. The Dutch 4 × 100 m relay team (Nadine Visser, Schippers, Naomi Sedney and Samuel) finished fifth in 42.32 s, but was disqualified for a changeover infringement. In the heats the team had also run 42.32 s, a new national record. Her stunning victory opened her up to scrutiny about possible doping. There were questions about the acne on Schippers back and face, which can be a sign of steroid abuse. Most insiders, however, dismissed those claims, pointing out that the acne was hereditary in the family and the fast track in Beijing.

Next year, she won the 100 m at the 2016 European Athletics Championships in Amsterdam with time of 10.90 s, by 3 tenths of a second. The Dutch team led by Schippers, with Samuel, Tessa van Schagen and anchor runner Naomi Sedney won the 4 × 100 m relay with a national record of 42.04 s.

At the 2016 Rio Olympics expectation was high that she would add an Olympic title to the gold medal at the 2015 World Championships, following in the footsteps of Fanny Blankers-Koen who had dominated the sprint events at the 1948 Summer Olympic Games, winning four golds. However, she finished fifth in the 100 m final and won the silver medal in the 200 m behind Elaine Thompson, who became the first woman for 28 years to complete the Olympic sprint double. After defeat in the 200 m, Schippers remained forlorn on the side of the track for a while, took off her spikes and hurled them to one side in frustration. "I came here for gold", she told reporters, disappointment showing in her face. "I'm not happy with the silver." The Dutch relay team was eliminated in the heats due to a botched relay handover between Samuel and Schippers.

=== Change of coaches ===
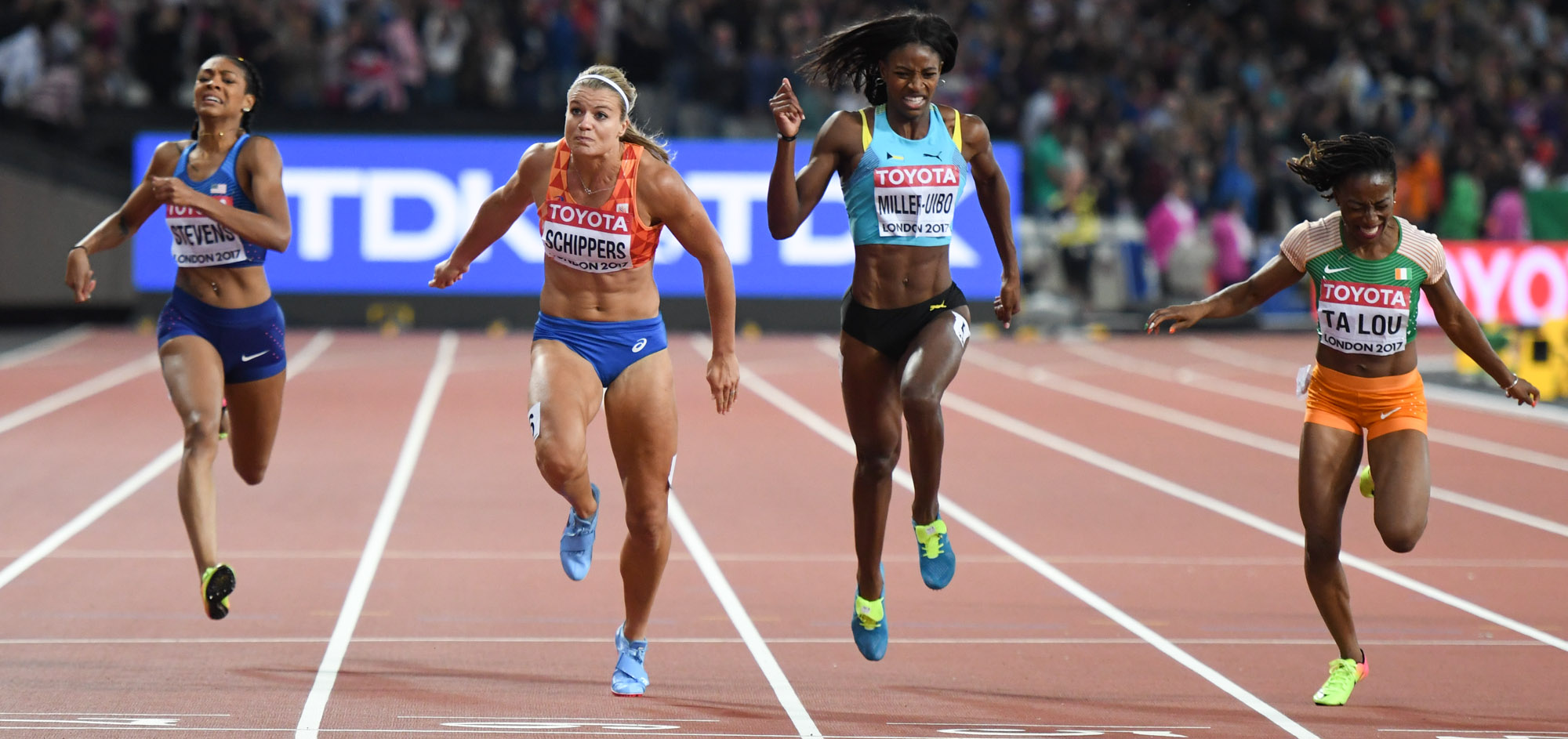
Schippers (2nd from the left) successfully defended her 200 m global title at the 2017 London World Championships.

After the disappointment of Rio, Schippers decided to change. She parted with Bart Bennema as her coach, who had overseen her transition from an outstanding heptathlete, winning bronze in the World Championships Moscow 2013, into a successful 100 m and 200 m sprinter. Both felt that she had to try a different approach to progress, and so she decided to join U.S. coach and sprint guru Rana Reider and focus on the 2017 World Championships in Athletics in London, to defend her world title in the 200 m. After winning the bronze in the 100 m, she won the 200 m title, joining Jamaican Merlene Ottey and USA's Allyson Felix as the only athletes to successfully defend a world title in the event. "It's a great feeling to be world champion for the second time," she said. "I was a bit nervous beforehand, but I'm a final runner, and bring my best in finals, so I'm very grateful for the experience today. There were so many Dutch fans in the stadium, all wearing orange. To win this two times in a row is brilliant." The Dutch 4 × 100 m relay team (Madiea Ghafoor, Schippers, Sedney, Samuel) finished 8th.

For the 2018 season, the focus for the "Flying Dutchwoman of the sprints" was on the 2018 European Athletics Championships at the Olympiastadion in Berlin. However, it was British sprinter Dina Asher-Smith who became the star of the sprint there, winning gold on both the 100 m and 200 m, as well as the 4 × 100 m relay. Schippers won a bronze in the 100 m and a silver in the 200 m. The 4 × 100 m relay team with Schippers, Marije van Hunenstijn, Samuel and Sedney also finished second.

Due to the disappointing results, the collaboration between Schippers and Reider came under scrutiny. Although Reider did prepare her for her special second world title at 200 m and bronze at 100 m at the 2017 World Championships, many other races looked rigid and she had lost her most important weapon, the 'acceleration' in the end. Due to increased power training she became more muscular, but on the track this did not lead to improvements. She could not improve her 2015 top chrono's. Reider suddenly left the National Sports Centre Papendal in the Netherlands in November 2018, and Schippers returned to her first coach, Bart Bennema.

Schippers won a silver in the 60 m at the European Indoor Championships. At the 2019 World Championships in Doha, Schippers had to withdraw before the final of the 100 m with an adductor problem. She subsequently withdrew from the 200 m and the 4 × 100 m relay.

In September 2023, Schippers announced her retirement as a professional athlete.

== After retirement ==
Schippers was a commentator for World Athletics at the 2024 World Indoor Championships in Glasgow, United Kingdom.

In March 2024, she became the tournament director of the 2025 European Athletics Indoor Championships in Apeldoorn, Netherlands.

== Personal bests ==
All information from World Athletics profile.

- 60 metres indoor – 7.00 (Berlin 2016) =NR
- 60 metres hurdles indoor – 8.18 (Apeldoorn 2012)

- 100 metres – 10.81 (-0.3) (Beijing 2015) NR
- 150 metres – 16.93 (+2.0) (Amsterdam 2013)
- 200 metres – 21.63 (+0.2) (Beijing 2015) European record, sixth-fastest athlete of all time
- 100 metres hurdles – 13.13 (-1.2 m/s, Götzis 2014)
- High jump – 1.80 m (London 2012)
  - High jump indoor - 1.74 m (Dortmund 2009)
- Long jump – 6.78 m (+0.0 m/s, Amsterdam 2014) previous NR, broken by Pauline Hondema in 2025
  - Long jump indoor – 6.48 m (Apeldoorn 2015)
- Shot put – 14.66 m (Götzis 2015)
  - Shot put indoor – 13.91 m (Apeldoorn 2012)
- Javelin throw – 42.82 m (Hoorn 2014)
- Heptathlon – 6545 pts (Götzis 2014) previous NR, broken by Anouk Vetter in 2016
- 4 × 100 metres relay – 42.04 (Amsterdam 2016) previous NR, broken by Visser/Klaver/Bisschops/Van Hunenstijn in 2025

== Competition results ==
All information from World Athletics profile.

=== International competitions ===
Representing the Netherlands
Year	Competition	Venue	Position	Event	Result	Notes
2009	European Junior Championships	Novi Sad, Serbia	4th	Heptathlon	5507 pts	
2010	World Junior Championships	Moncton, Canada	3rd	4 × 100 m relay	44.09	NJR
2010	World Junior Championships	Moncton, Canada	1st	Heptathlon	5967 pts	NJR
2011	European Indoor Championships	Paris, France	11th (sf)	60 m	7.30 i	
2011	European Junior Championships	Tallinn, Estonia	1st	Heptathlon	6153 pts	
2011	World Championships	Daegu, South Korea	9th (sf)	200 m	22.92	
2011	World Championships	Daegu, South Korea	9th (h)	4 × 100 m relay	43.44	NR
2012	World Indoor Championships	Istanbul, Turkey	10th (sf)	60 m	7.25 i	
2012	European Championships	Helsinki, Finland	5th	200 m	23.53	
2012	European Championships	Helsinki, Finland	2nd	4 × 100 m relay	42.80	NR
2012	Olympic Games	London, United Kingdom	6th	4 × 100 m relay	42.70	
2012	Olympic Games	London, United Kingdom	11th	Heptathlon	6324 pts	
2013	European Indoor Championships	Gothenburg, Sweden	4th	60 m	7.14 i	
2013	European U23 Championships	Tampere, Finland	1st	100 m	11.13	(wind: -0.7 m/s)
2013	European U23 Championships	Tampere, Finland	4th	4 × 100 m relay	44.18	
2013	European U23 Championships	Tampere, Finland	3rd	Long jump	6.59 m	(wind: +1.6 m/s)
2013	World Championships	Moscow, Russia	3rd	Heptathlon	6477 pts	NR
2014	World Indoor Championships	Sopot, Poland	10th (sf)	60 m	7.18 i	
2014	European Championships	Zurich, Switzerland	1st	100 m	11.12	
2014	European Championships	Zurich, Switzerland	1st	200 m	22.03	NR
2014	European Championships	Zurich, Switzerland	3rd (h)	4 × 100 m relay	42.77	^{1}
2015	European Indoor Championships	Prague, Czech Republic	1st	60 m	7.05 i	
2015	World Championships	Beijing, China	2nd	100 m	10.81	NR
2015	World Championships	Beijing, China	1st	200 m	21.63	CR AR
2015	World Championships	Beijing, China	—	4 × 100 m relay	DQ	
2016	World Indoor Championships	Portland, United States	2nd	60 m	7.04 i	
2016	European Championships	Amsterdam, Netherlands	1st	100 m	10.90	
2016	European Championships	Amsterdam, Netherlands	1st	4 × 100 m relay	42.04	NR
2016	Olympic Games	Rio de Janeiro, Brazil	5th	100 m	10.90	
2016	Olympic Games	Rio de Janeiro, Brazil	2nd	200 m	21.88	
2016	Olympic Games	Rio de Janeiro, Brazil	9th (h)	4 × 100 m relay	42.88	
2017	World Relays	Nassau, Bahamas	4th	4 × 100 m relay	43.11	
2017	World Championships	London, United Kingdom	3rd	100 m	10.96	
2017	World Championships	London, United Kingdom	1st	200 m	22.05	
2017	World Championships	London, United Kingdom	8th	4 × 100 m relay	43.07	
2018	World Indoor Championships	Birmingham, United Kingdom	5th	60 m	7.10 i	
2018	European Championships	Berlin, Germany	3rd	100 m	10.99	
2018	European Championships	Berlin, Germany	2nd	200 m	22.14	
2018	European Championships	Berlin, Germany	2nd	4 × 100 m relay	42.15	
2019	European Indoor Championships	Glasgow, United Kingdom	2nd	60 m	7.14 i	
2019	World Championships	Doha, Qatar	7th (sf)	100 m	11.07	^{2}
2021	World Relays	Chorzów, Poland	3rd	4 × 100 m relay	44.10	
2021	Olympic Games	Tokyo, Japan	17th (sf)	200 m	23.03	
2021	Olympic Games	Tokyo, Japan	7th (h)	4 × 100 m relay	42.81	^{1}

^{1}Did not finish in the final
^{2}Did not start in the final

=== Circuit win and titles ===
- Diamond League Overall 200 m Diamond Race Title: 2016
  - 2014 (2): Lausanne Athletissima (4 × 100 m relay), Glasgow Grand Prix (200 m, NR)
  - 2015 (2): London Anniversary Games (100 m, NR), Brussels Memorial Van Damme (200 m)
  - 2016 (4): Oslo Bislett Games (200 m, WL DLR), Monaco Herculis (100 m), London (200 m), Paris Meeting (200 m)
  - 2017 (3): Rome Golden Gala (100 m), Oslo (200 m), Lausanne (200 m, SB)
  - 2019 (3): Oslo (200 m, SB), Lausanne (4 × 100 m relay)
  - 2021 (1): Gateshead Grand Prix (4 × 100 m relay)

=== National titles ===
- Dutch Athletics Championships
  - 100 metres: 2011, 2012, 2014, 2015, 2019, 2021, 2022
  - Long jump: 2012, 2014
- Dutch Indoor Athletics Championships
  - 60 metres: 2010, 2011, 2012, 2013, 2014, 2015, 2016, 2018, 2019
  - Long jump: 2011, 2013, 2014, 2015

== Recognition ==
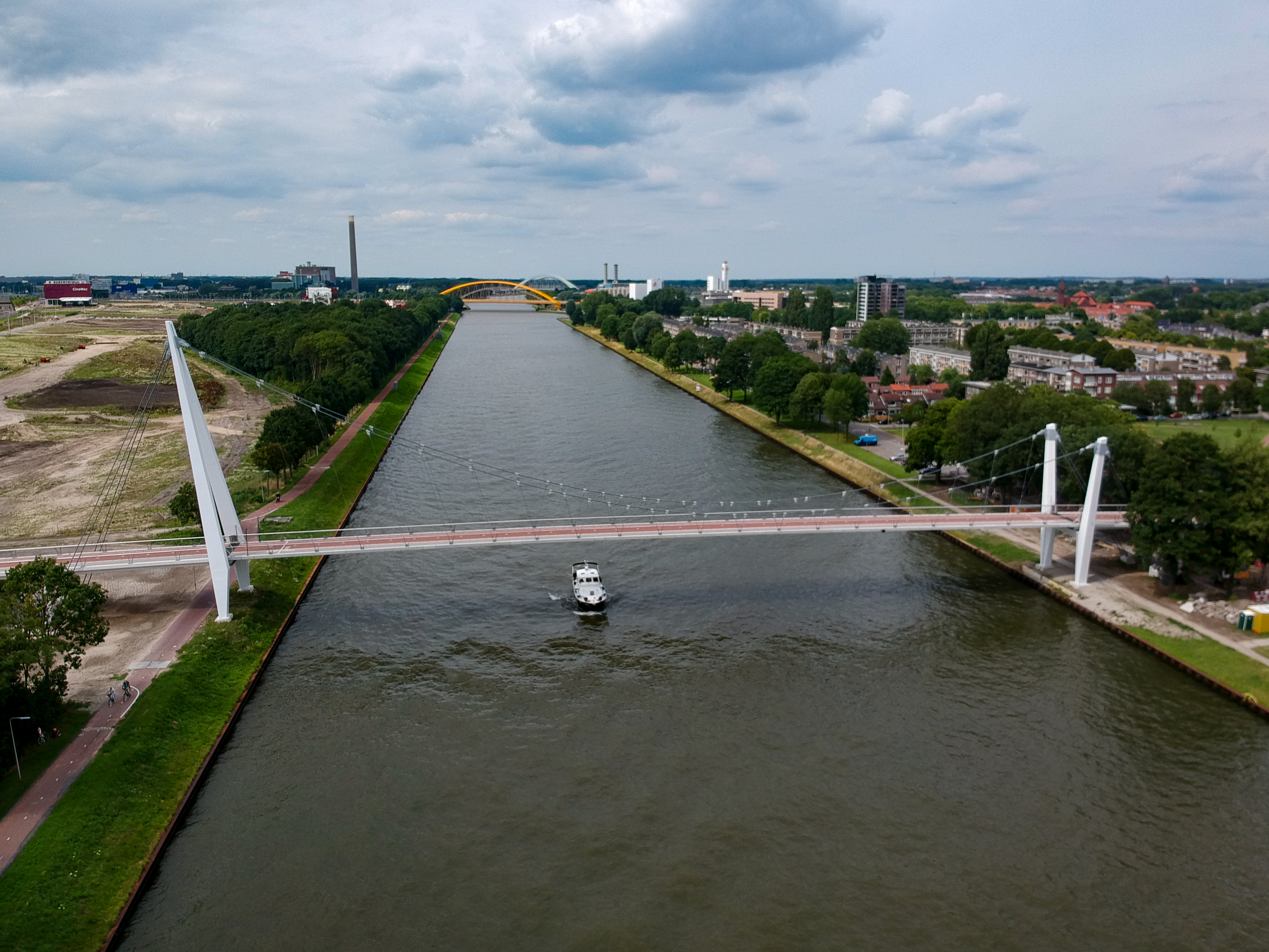
Dafne Schippersbrug in 2017

She was the Dutch Women's Athlete of the Year in 2011–2017; the European Women's Athlete of the Month in July 2014, May 2015, August 2015, February 2016, and May 2016; the European Women's Athlete of the Year in 2014 and 2015; and Dutch Sportswoman of the Year in 2015 and 2017.

She received the Membership of Merit of the Royal Dutch Athletics Federation in 2016.

The Dafne Schippersbrug (Dafne Schippers Bridge) in Utrecht, where Schippers grew up, was opened in April 2017, and named in her honour.

Records
Preceded by Marita Koch	Women's 200m European record holder 28 August 2015 – present	Incumbent
Achievements
Preceded by Allyson Felix	Women's season's best performance, 200 m 2015	Succeeded by Elaine Thompson
Awards
Preceded by Yvonne Hak	Women's Dutch Athlete of the Year; 2011 – 2017	Succeeded by Sifan Hassan
Preceded by Zuzana Hejnová	Women's European Athlete of the Year; 2014, 2015	Succeeded by Ruth Beitia
Preceded by Ireen Wüst; Sanne Wevers	Dutch Sportswoman of the Year; 2015; 2017	Succeeded by Sanne Wevers; Suzanne Schulting
