= Sindija Bukša =

Latvian sprinter (born 1997)

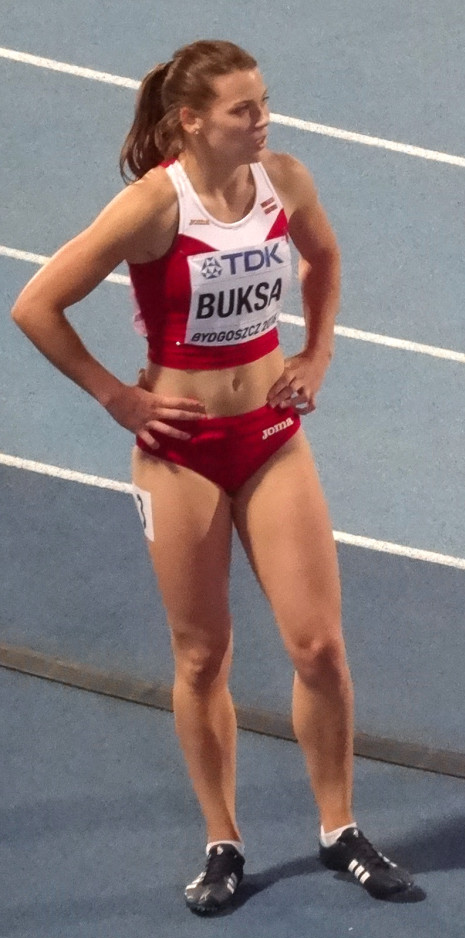
- Sindija Bukša in 2016

Personal information
- Born: 14 December 1997 (age 28) Ķeipene, Latvia

Sport
- Sport: Athletics
- Event(s): 100 m, 200 m
- Club: Lāča SS
- Coached by: Viktors Lācis

Sindija Bukša (born 14 December 1997) is a Latvian sprinter. She represented her country at the 2017 World Championships without advancing from the first round. She won a gold medal at the European U23 Championships.

== International competitions ==
Year	Competition	Venue	Position	Event	Notes
Representing Latvia
2015	European Junior Championships	Eskilstuna, Sweden	17th (sf)	100 m	12.06
2015	European Junior Championships	Eskilstuna, Sweden	11th (sf)	200 m	23.92
2016	World U20 Championships	Bydgoszcz, Poland	16th (sf)	200 m	23.99
2017	European Indoor Championships	Belgrade, Serbia	27th (h)	60 m	7.50
2017	European U23 Championships	Bydgoszcz, Poland	11th (sf)	100 m	11.62
2017	European U23 Championships	Bydgoszcz, Poland	6th	200 m	23.41
2017	World Championships	London, United Kingdom	29th (h)	200 m	23.54
2018	European Championships	Berlin, Germany	6th (h)	200 m	23.36^{1}
2019	European Indoor Championships	Glasgow, United Kingdom	22nd (sf)	60 m	7.42
2019	European U23 Championships	Gävle, Sweden	7th	100 m	11.64
2019	European U23 Championships	Gävle, Sweden	1st	200 m	23.24
2019	World Championships	Doha, Qatar	36th (h)	200 m	23.53

^{1}Did not start in the semifinals

== Personal bests ==
Outdoor

- 100 metres – 11.29 LR (+1.1 m/s, Rīga 2018)
- 200 metres – 23.02 U23 LR (+1.3 m/s, Rīga 2018)

Indoor

- 60 metres – 7.43 (Kuldiga 2018)
- 200 metres – 23.92 (Kuldiga 2018)
