= Andrea Bouma =

Dutch sprinter

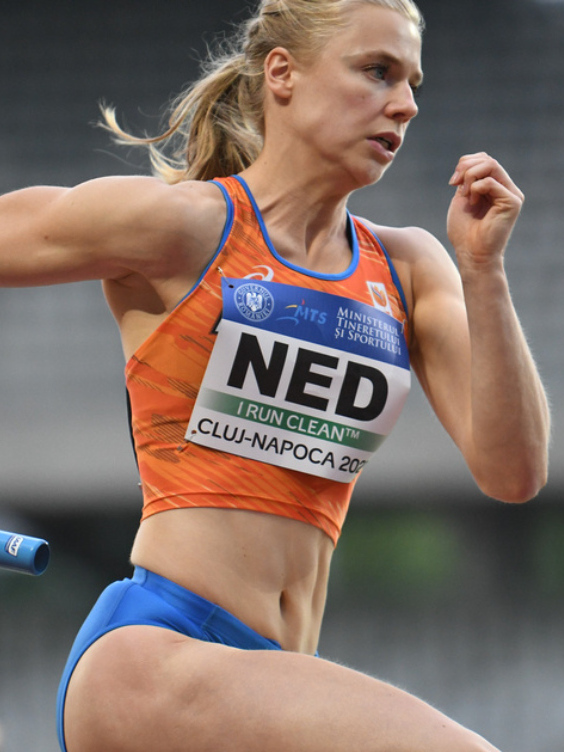
- Andrea Bouma in 2021

Personal information
- Nationality: Dutch
- Born: 6 November 1999 (age 26)

Sport
- Sport: Track and Field
- Event: 400 metres
Medal record
Women's athletics
Representing the Netherlands
World Indoor Championships
Silver medal – second place	2022 Belgrade	4×400 m relay
European Championships
Gold medal – first place	2022 Munich	4×400 m relay

Andrea Bouma (Dutch: [ɑnˈdreːjaː ˈbʌumaː]; born 6 November 1999) is a Dutch athlete who competes as a sprinter. She has competed for the Netherlands in the 4 x 400 metres relay in a multiple number of major championships, winning a gold medal at the 2022 European Athletics Championships and a silver medal at the 2022 World Athletics Indoor Championships.

== Biography ==
Bouma competed at the 2016 World U20 Championships in the women's 200 metres. She ran 24.19 s in the heats to advance to the semi-finals. She then ran 24.19 s in the semi-finals and did not advance to the final.

At the 2020 Dutch Championships, Bouma won the gold medal in the 400 metres with a time of 53.87 s.

In April 2021, she was included in the Dutch squad for the World Athletics Relays, held in Silesia. She was selected as part of the relay pool for the Dutch team at the delayed 2020 Olympic Games in Tokyo, Japan, in 2021.

Bouma competed at the World Indoor Championships in Belgrade in March 2022. She ran in the heats of the women's 4 × 400 m relay, as the Netherlands went on to win the silver medal in the final. In June 2020, Bouma won the silver medal in the 400 metres at the Dutch Championships with a time of 53.61 seconds to finish runner-up to Hanneke Oosterwegel.

In July 2022, Bouma competed at the World Championships in Eugene, Oregon. She ran in the heats of the women's 4 × 100 m relay, but the Netherlands did not advance to the final. In August 2022, Bouma competed at the European Championships in Munich, Germany. She ran in the heats of the women's 4 × 400 m relay, helping the Netherlands qualify for the final where they won ultimately the gold medal.

In May 2026, she ran at the 2026 World Athletics Relays in the mixed 4 × 400 metres relay in Gaborone, Botswana.

== Personal bests ==
- 100 metres – 11.87 (+1.4 m/s, Vught 2017)
- 200 metres – 23.71 (+1.4 m/s, La Chaux-de-Fonds 2021)
- 400 metres – 52.73 (Geneva 2022)
