= 2019 European Athletics U23 Championships – Women's 200 metres =

The women's 200 metres event at the 2019 European Athletics U23 Championships was held in Gävle, Sweden, at Gavlehov Stadium Park on 12 and 13 July.

== Medalists ==
Gold	Silver	Bronze
Sindija Bukša; Latvia	Estelle Raffai; France	Sarah Richard; France

== Results ==
=== Heats ===
12 July
Qualification: First 3 in each heat (Q) and next 4 fastest (q) qualified for the semifinals.

Wind:
Heat 1: +1.1 m/s, Heat 2: +0.6 m/s, Heat 3: -0.1 m/s, Heat 4: +0.6 m/s

Rank	Heat	Name	Nationality	Time	Notes
1	3	Sindija Bukša	Latvia	23.38	Q, SB
2	1	Sarah Richard	France	23.40	Q
3	2	Paula Sevilla	Spain	23.48	Q
4	1	Sophia Junk	Germany	23.49	Q, =SB
5	2	Marina Maksimova	Authorised Neutral Athletes	23.71	Q, SB
6	4	Estelle Raffai	France	23.79	Q
7	4	Martyna Kotwiła	Poland	23.86	Q
8	4	Marina Andreea Baboi	Romania	23.87	Q
9	4	Kristal Awuah	Great Britain	23.88	q
10	3	Manon Depuydt	Belgium	23.92	Q
11	3	Marlena Gola	Poland	23.96	Q
12	3	Marine Mignon	France	24.00	q
13	2	Helene Rønningen	Norway	24.04	Q
14	1	Nikola Bendová	Czech Republic	24.08	Q
15	4	Emelie Rantzow	Sweden	24.15	q, SB
16	1	Alessia Pavese	Italy	24.18	q
17	2	Yana Kachur	Ukraine	24.18	
18	4	Marte Pettersen	Norway	24.31	
19	1	Ingvild Meinseth	Norway	24.38	
20	1	Emma Beiter Bomme	Denmark	24.52	
21	2	Silke Lemmens	Switzerland	24.55	
22	3	Viktoriya Ratnikova	Ukraine	24.58	
23	3	Patrizia van der Weken	Luxembourg	24.73	SB
24	3	Ioana Gheorghe	Romania	24.79	
25	2	Julia Schwarzinger	Austria	24.84	
26	3	Emma Jansson	Sweden	24.86	
27	2	Patrīcija Karlīna Roshofa	Latvia	25.04	
28	4	Jusztina Csóti	Hungary	25.25	
29	1	Dora Filipović	Croatia	25.46	

=== Semifinals ===
13 July
Qualification: First 3 in each heat (Q) and next 2 fastest (q) qualified for the final.

Wind:
Heat 1: -1.1 m/s, Heat 2: -0.3 m/s

Rank	Heat	Name	Nationality	Time	Notes
1	2	Sindija Bukša	Latvia	23.39	Q
2	2	Estelle Raffai	France	23.61	Q
3	1	Sarah Richard	France	23.72	Q
4	2	Sophia Junk	Germany	23.76	Q
5	2	Kristal Awuah	Great Britain	23.78	q
6	1	Paula Sevilla	Spain	23.97	Q
7	1	Marina Andreea Baboi	Romania	24.04	Q
8	2	Manon Depuydt	Belgium	24.05	q
9	2	Marlena Gola	Poland	24.11	
10	2	Nikola Bendová	Czech Republic	24.20	
11	1	Marina Maksimova	Authorised Neutral Athletes	24.26	
12	2	Marine Mignon	France	24.36	
13	1	Helene Rønningen	Norway	24.37	
14	1	Emelie Rantzow	Sweden	24.42	
15	1	Alessia Pavese	Italy	24.99	
	1	Martyna Kotwiła	Poland	DNF	

=== Final ===
13 July

Wind: -0.9 m/s

Rank	Lane	Name	Nationality	Time	Notes
1st place, gold medalist(s)	4	Sindija Bukša	Latvia	23.24	SB
2nd place, silver medalist(s)	6	Estelle Raffai	France	23.35	SB
3rd place, bronze medalist(s)	5	Sarah Richard	France	23.50	
4	3	Paula Sevilla	Spain	23.52	
5	8	Sophia Junk	Germany	23.53	
6	1	Kristal Awuah	Great Britain	23.66	
7	2	Manon Depuydt	Belgium	24.04	
8	7	Marina Andreea Baboi	Romania	24.10	
