= Yana Kachur =

Ukrainian sprinter (born 1997)

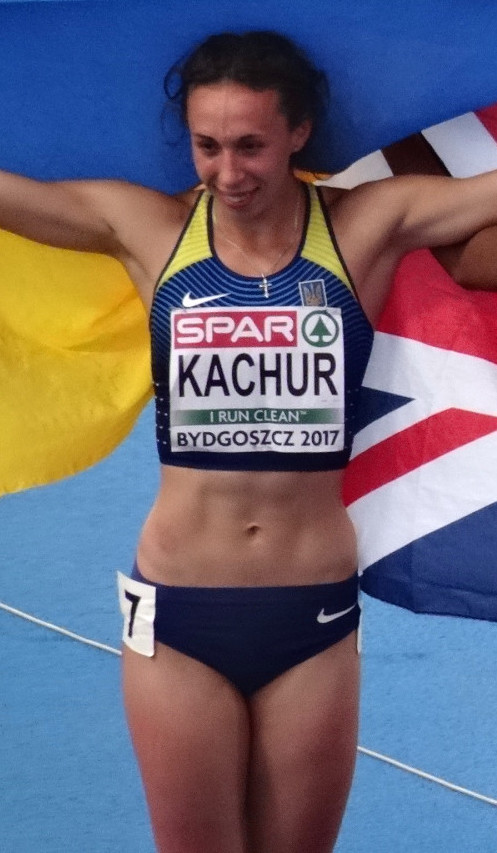
- Yana Kachur in 2017

Personal information
- Born: 13 January 1997 (age 29) Haivoron, Ukraine
- Height: 1.72 m (5 ft 8 in)
- Weight: 59 kg (130 lb)

Sport
- Sport: Athletics
- Event(s): 100 m, 200 m

Yana Kachur (Ukrainian: Яна Качур; born 13 January 1997) is a Ukrainian sprinter. She represented her country at the 2017 World Championships narrowly missing the semifinals. Additionally, she won two medals at the 2017 European U23 Championships.

== International competitions ==
Year	Competition	Venue	Position	Event	Notes
Representing Ukraine
2013	World Youth Championships	Donetsk, Ukraine	24th (h)	400 m	56.00
2014	Youth Olympic Games	Nanjing, China	1st (B)	400 m	54.48
2016	World U20 Championships	Bydgoszcz, Poland	11th (sf)	100 m	11.62
2017	European U23 Championships	Bydgoszcz, Poland	3rd	200 m	23.20
2017	European U23 Championships	Bydgoszcz, Poland	3rd	4 × 400 m relay	3:30.22
2017	World Championships	London, United Kingdom	24th (h)	200 m	23.47
2017	World Championships	London, United Kingdom	11th (h)	4 × 100 m relay	43.77
2018	European Championships	Berlin, Germany	22nd (h)	200 m	24.00
2018	European Championships	Berlin, Germany	10th (h)	4 × 100 m relay	43.90
2019	European Indoor Championships	Glasgow, United Kingdom	37th (h)	60 m	7.52
2019	World Relays	Yokohama, Japan	14th (h)	4 × 100 m relay	44.55
2019	European U23 Championships	Gävle, Sweden	17th (h)	200 m	24.18
2019	European U23 Championships	Gävle, Sweden	4th	4 × 400 m relay	3:34.33

== Personal bests ==
Outdoor

- 100 metres – 11.51 (+1.2 m/s, Almaty 2016)
- 200 metres – 23.20 (+1.3 m/s, Bydgoszcz 2017)
- 400 metres – 53.96 (Kirovograd 2016)

Indoor

- 60 metres – 7.50 (Kyiv 2016)
- 200 metres – 24.63 (Kyiv 2017)
- 400 metres – 54.47 (Sumy 2018)
