= Finette Agyapong =

English sprinter

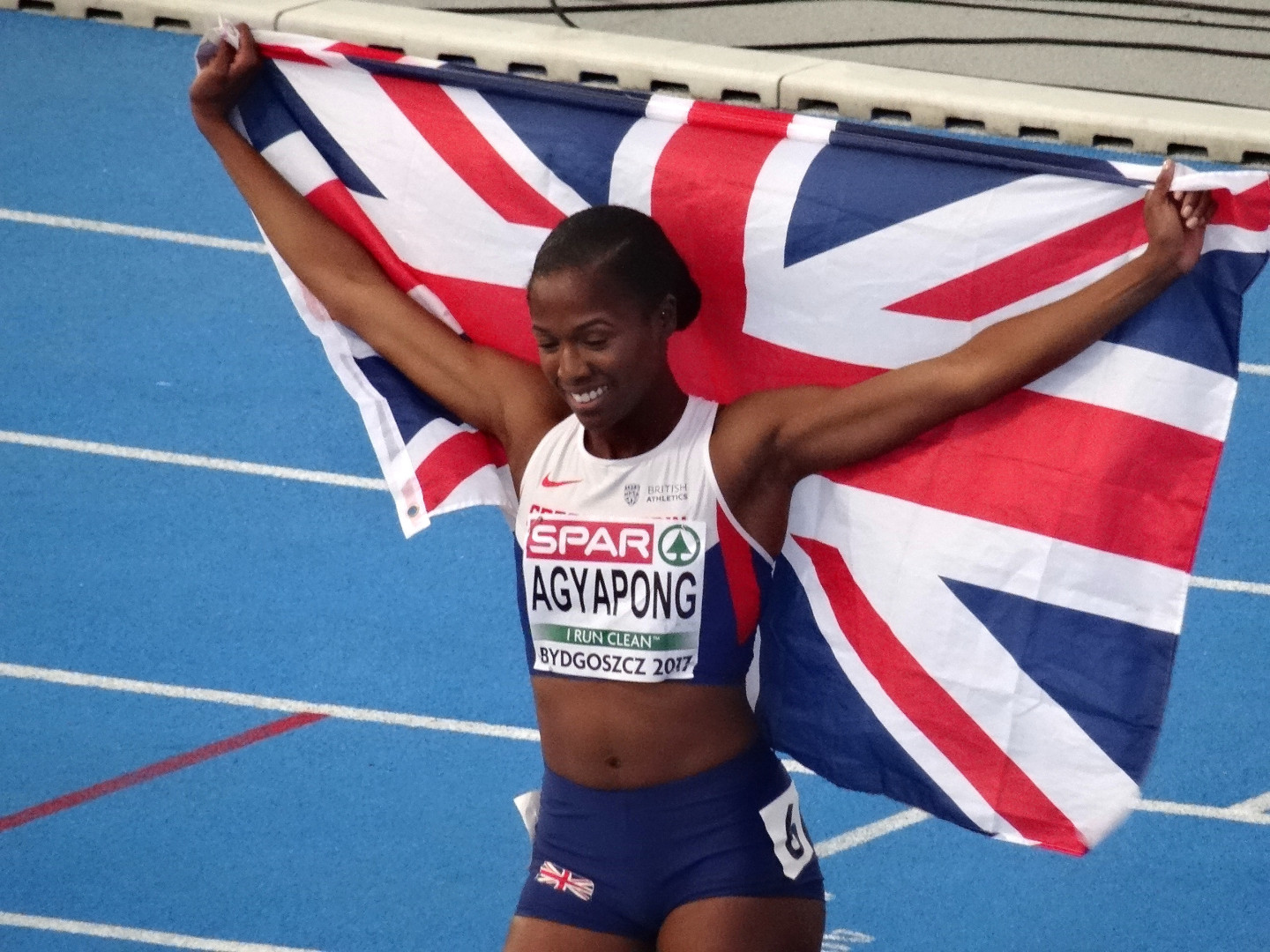
- Finette Agyapong in 2017

Personal information
- Born: 1 February 1997 (age 29) London, England
- Education: Brunel University of London
- Height: 1.80 m (5 ft 11 in)
- Weight: 70 kg (154 lb)

Sport
- Sport: Athletics
- Event: 200 metres
- Club: Newham & Essex Beagles
- Coached by: Carol Nourrice
Medal record
Women's athletics
Representing Great Britain
European Championships
Bronze medal – third place	2018 Berlin	4 x 400m relay
Women's junior athletics
Representing Great Britain
European U23 Championships
Gold medal – first place	2017 Bydgoszcz	200m

Finette Agyapong (born 1 February 1997) is an English sprinter competing primarily in the 200 metres. She won a gold medal in the 200 metres at the 2017 European U23 Championships.

She currently holds the British record in the rarely contested indoor 300 metres race.

== International competitions ==
Year	Competition	Venue	Position	Event	Notes
Representing Great Britain and England
2016	World U20 Championships	Bydgoszcz, Poland	7th	200 m	23.74
2016	World U20 Championships	Bydgoszcz, Poland	–	4 × 100 m relay	DNF
2017	European U23 Championships	Bydgoszcz, Poland	1st	200 m	22.87
2017	European U23 Championships	Bydgoszcz, Poland	–	4 × 100 m relay	DNF
2018	Commonwealth Games	Gold Coast, Australia	10th (sf)	200 m	23.38
2018	Commonwealth Games	Gold Coast, Australia	4th	4 × 400 m relay	3:27.21
2018	European Championships	Berlin, Germany	2nd (h)	4 × 400 m relay	3:28.12
2019	European U23 Championships	Gävle, Sweden	2nd	4 × 400 m relay	3:32.91

== Personal bests ==
Outdoor

- 100 metres – 11.49 (+1.9 m/s, Birmingham 2017)
- 200 metres – 22.86 (+1.3 m/s, Bydgoszcz 2017)
- 300 metres – 36.86 (Newham 2017)
- 400 metres – 52.41 (Willesden 2017)

Indoor

- 60 metres – 7.35 (Birmingham 2018)
- 200 metres – 23.30 (Birmingham 2018)
- 300 metres – 37.74 (Ostrava 2018) NR
