= Corinna Schwab =

German sprinter (born 1999)

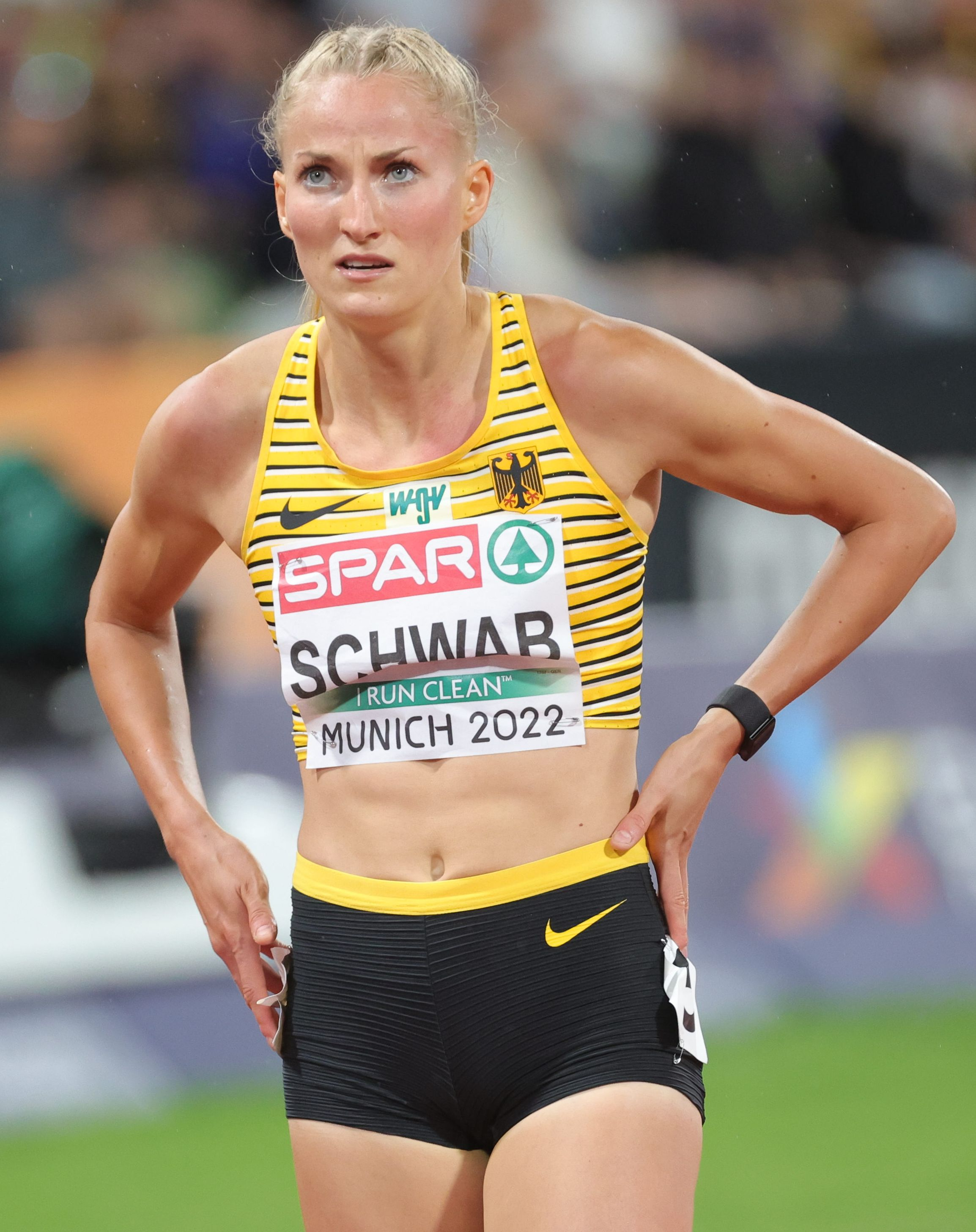
- Corinna Schwab in 2022

Personal information
- Nationality: German
- Born: 5 April 1999 (age 26) Schwandorf, Germany

Sport
- Sport: Athletics
- Event: 400 metres

Corinna Schwab (born 5 April 1999) is a German athlete. She competed in the women's 400 metres event at the 2021 European Athletics Indoor Championships.
