= Alina Kalistratova =

Ukrainian sprinter

Personal information
- Nationality: Ukrainian
- Born: 6 November 1996 (age 28)

Sport
- Sport: Sprinting
- Event: 4 × 100 metres

Alina Kalistratova (born 6 November 1996) is a Ukrainian sprinter. She competed in the women's 4 × 100 metres relay at the 2017 World Championships in Athletics.
