= 2022 in 100 metres =

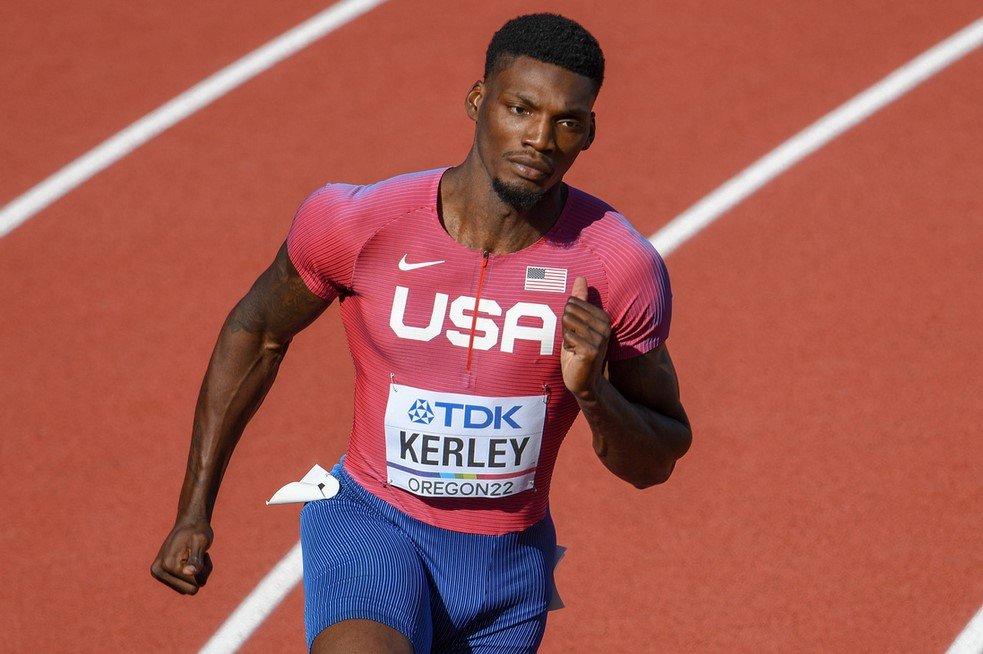
American Fred Kerley, World Leader (WL) in 100 metres 2022 men's outdoor season.

2022 in 100 metres lists the World Best Year Performance in the year 2022 in both the men's and the women's 100 metres.

== Records ==
Standing records prior to the 2020 season
Men's World record	Usain Bolt (JAM)	9.58	Berlin, Germany	16 August 2009
Women's World record	Florence Griffith Joyner (USA)	10.49	Indianapolis, United States	16 July 1988

== Men top 60 ==
#	Time	Wind	Athlete	Country	Venue	Date
1	9.76	+1.4	Fred Kerley	United States	Hayward Field, Eugene, OR (USA)	24 June 2022
2	9.81	+1.5	Trayvon Bromell	United States	Hayward Field, Eugene, OR (USA)	24 June 2022
3	9.85	+2.0	Ferdinand Omanyala	Kenya	Moi International Sports Centre, Kasarani, Nairobi (KEN)	7 May 2022
3	9.85	+1.8	Marvin Bracy-Williams	United States	Hayward Field, Eugene, OR (USA)	24 June 2022
3	9.85	+1.0	Yohan Blake	Jamaica	National Stadium, Kingston (JAM)	24 June 2022
6	9.86	+0.2	Oblique Seville	Jamaica	National Stadium, Kingston (JAM)	21 May 2022
6	9.86	+0.7	Micah Williams	United States	John McDonnell Field, Fayetteville, AR (USA)	27 May 2022
8	9.87	+1.5	Christian Coleman	United States	Hayward Field, Eugene, OR (USA)	24 June 2022
9	9.90	+2.0	Benjamin Azaamati	Ghana	Mike A. Myers Stadium, Austin, TX (USA)	25 March 2022
9	9.90	+1.8	Elijah Hall	United States	Hayward Field, Eugene, OR (USA)	24 June 2022
11	9.91	+0.8	Letsile Tebogo	Botswana	Pascual Guerrero Stadium, Cali (COL)	2 August 2022
12	9.93	-1.2	Reece Prescod	United Kingdom	Mestský Stadion, Ostrava (CZE)	31 May 2022
12	9.93	+1.0	Ackeem Blake	Jamaica	National Stadium, Kingston (JAM)	24 June 2022
14	9.94	+0.8	Joseph Paul Amoah	Ghana	Hughes Stadium, Morgan St. Univ., Baltimore, MD (USA)	23 April 2022
15	9.95	+1.5	Kenny Bednarek	United States	Hayward Field, Eugene, OR (USA)	24 June 2022
15	9.95	+0.1	Lamont Marcell Jacobs	Italy	Olympiastadion, München (GER)	16 August 2022
15	9.95	+0.3	Noah Lyles	United States	Olympiastadion, Berlin (GER)	4 September 2022
18	9.96	+1.8	Kyree King	United States	Hayward Field, Eugene, OR (USA)	24 June 2022
18	9.96	+1.6	Yupun Abeykoon	Sri Lanka	Stade de La Charrière, La Chaux-de-Fonds (SUI)	3 July 2022
20	9.97	+0.1	Zharnel Hughes	United Kingdom	Hayward Field, Eugene, OR (USA)	15 July 2022
20	9.97	+0.3	Akani Simbine	South Africa	Hayward Field, Eugene, OR (USA)	15 July 2022
22	9.98	+1.6	Matthew Boling	United States	Percy Beard Track, Gainesville, FL (USA)	16 April 2022
22	9.98	+1.5	Cravont Charleston	United States	Centre sportif Bout-du-Monde, Genève (SUI)	11 June 2022
22	9.98	+1.1	Emmanuel Matadi	Liberia	Hasely Crawford Stadium, Port-of-Spain (TTO)	24 June 2022
22	9.98	-0.3	Abdul Hakim Sani Brown	Japan	Hayward Field, Eugene, OR (USA)	15 July 2022
26	9.99	+0.3	Davonte Burnett	Jamaica	Hilmer Lodge Stadium, Walnut, CA (USA)	16 April 2022
26	9.99	+0.1	Favour Ashe	Nigeria	Samuel Ogbemudia Stadium, Benin City (NGR)	25 June 2022
26	9.99	+1.6	Reynier Mena	Cuba	Stade de La Charrière, La Chaux-de-Fonds (SUI)	3 July 2022
26	9.99	+1.6	Méba Mickaël Zeze	France	Stade de La Charrière, La Chaux-de-Fonds (SUI)	3 July 2022
26	9.99	+0.8	Kendal Williams	United States	Billy J. Murphy Track and Field Complex, Memphis, TN (USA)	30 July 2022
31	10.00	+1.3	Jerome Blake	Canada	National Training Center, Clermont, FL (USA)	1 May 2022
31	10.00	+1.1	Ismael Kone	Ivory Coast	Billy Hayes T& F Complex, Bloomington, IN (USA)	25 May 2022
31	10.00	+0.6	Joseph Fahnbulleh	Liberia	Hayward Field, Eugene, OR (USA)	10 June 2022
31	10.00	+1.2	Conroy Jones	Jamaica	National Stadium, Kingston (JAM)	23 June 2022
31	10.00	+1.0	Jelani Walker	Jamaica	National Stadium, Kingston (JAM)	24 June 2022
36	10.01	-1.3	Samson Colebrooke	Bahamas	Cheney Stadium, Atlanta, GA (USA)	9 April 2022
37	10.02	-0.2	Brandon Carnes	United States	Estadio Francisco Montaner, Ponce (PUR)	12 May 2022
37	10.02	+1.4	Cejhae Greene	Antigua and Barbuda	Vanderbilt Track, Nashville, TN (USA)	5 June 2022
37	10.02	+1.1	Ryuichiro Sakai	Japan	Athletic Stadium, Tottori (JPN)	26 June 2022
37	10.02	+0.6	Arthur Cissé	Ivory Coast	Hayward Field, Eugene, OR (USA)	15 July 2022
37	10.02	+0.8	Bouwahjgie Nkrumie	Jamaica	Pascual Guerrero Stadium, Cali (COL)	2 August 2022
42	10.03	+0.7	Terrence Jones	Bahamas	John McDonnell Field, Fayetteville, AR (USA)	27 May 2022
42	10.03	+0.6	Udodi Onwuzurike	Nigeria	John McDonnell Field, Fayetteville, AR (USA)	27 May 2022
42	10.03	+1.2	Oshane Bailey	Jamaica	National Stadium, Kingston (JAM)	23 June 2022
42	10.03	0.0	Jerod Elcock	Trinidad and Tobago	Hasely Crawford Stadium, Port-of-Spain (TTO)	25 June 2022
42	10.03	-0.6	Josephus Lyles	United States	Billy J. Murphy Track and Field Complex, Memphis, TN (USA)	30 July 2022
47	10.04	+1.7	Clarence Munyai	South Africa	Bestmed Tuks Stadium, Pretoria (RSA)	12 March 2022
47	10.04	-1.3	Ameer Webb	United States	Cheney Stadium, Atlanta, GA (USA)	9 April 2022
47	10.04	-0.1	Erriyon Knighton	United States	Percy Beard Track, Gainesville, FL (USA)	16 April 2022
47	10.04	+1.9	Raymond Ekevwo	Nigeria	Clyde Hart Track & Field Stadium, Waco, TX (USA)	23 April 2022
47	10.04	+1.9	Alaba Akintola	Nigeria	Park West Ath. Complex, San Antonio, TX (USA)	15 May 2022
47	10.04	+0.4	Rodrigo do Nascimento	Brazil	Rio de Janeiro (BRA)	22 June 2022
47	10.04	+0.6	Kemar Bailey-Cole	Jamaica	National Stadium, Kingston (JAM)	24 June 2022
47	10.04	+1.6	Lucas Ansah-Peprah	Germany	Stade de La Charrière, La Chaux-de-Fonds (SUI)	3 July 2022
55	10.05	+0.1	Courtney Lindsey	United States	Terry & Linda Fuller T&F Complex, Lubbock, TX (USA)	30 April 2022
55	10.05	+1.9	Jo'Vaughn Martin	United States	Billy Hayes T& F Complex, Bloomington, IN (USA)	25 May 2022
55	10.05	+0.5	Andre De Grasse	Canada	Bislett Stadion, Oslo (NOR)	16 June 2022
55	10.05	+1.8	Eugene Amo-Dadzie	United Kingdom	Stratford Community Track, London (GBR)	14 August 2022
59	10.06	+1.1	Aaron Brown	Canada	Hayward Field, Eugene, OR (USA)	15 July 2022
60	10.07	-1.3	Ojie Edoburun	United Kingdom	Cheney Stadium, Atlanta, GA (USA)	9 April 2022
60	10.07	+0.4	Felipe Bardi	Brazil	Bragança Paulista (BRA)	14 May 2022
60	10.07	+1.0	Chris Royster	United States	Emory Woodruff Physical Education Center, Atlanta, GA (USA)	18 May 2022
60	10.07	0.0	Kion Benjamin	Trinidad and Tobago	Hasely Crawford Stadium, Port-of-Spain (TTO)	25 June 2022

== Women top 60 ==
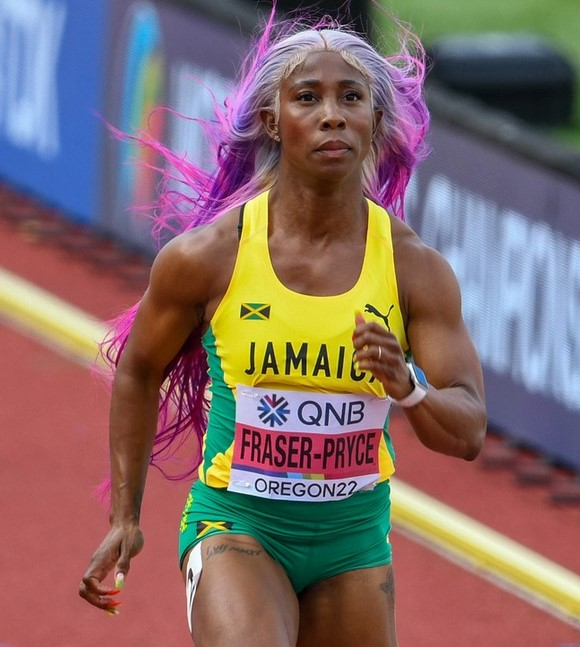
Jamaican Shelly-Ann Fraser-Pryce, World Leader (WL) in 100 metres 2022 women's outdoor season.

#	Time	Wind	Athlete	Country	Venue	Date
1	10.62	+0.4	Shelly-Ann Fraser-Pryce	Jamaica	Stade Louis II, Monaco	10 August 2022
2	10.71	+0.4	Shericka Jackson	Jamaica	Stade Louis II, Monaco	10 August 2022
3	10.72	+0.4	Marie-Josée Ta Lou	Ivory Coast	Stade Louis II, Monaco	10 August 2022
4	10.79	+0.7	Elaine Thompson-Herah	Jamaica	Hayward Field, Eugene, OR (USA)	28 May 2022
5	10.81	+1.7	Julien Alfred	Saint Lucia	Terry & Linda Fuller T&F Complex, Lubbock, TX (USA)	14 May 2022
5	10.81	+0.5	Aleia Hobbs	United States	Hayward Field, Eugene, OR (USA)	24 June 2022
7	10.82	+0.5	Melissa Jefferson	United States	Hayward Field, Eugene, OR (USA)	24 June 2022
7	10.82	+0.6	Twanisha Terry	United States	Billy J. Murphy Track and Field Complex, Memphis, TN (USA)	30 July 2022
9	10.83	+0.8	Dina Asher-Smith	United Kingdom	Hayward Field, Eugene, OR (USA)	17 July 2022
9	10.83	+0.6	Tamari Davis	United States	Billy J. Murphy Track and Field Complex, Memphis, TN (USA)	30 July 2022
11	10.85	+1.3	Sha'Carri Richardson	United States	Icahn Stadium, New York, NY (USA)	12 June 2022
12	10.87	+1.8	Cambrea Sturgis	United States	Marcus T. Johnson Track, Greensboro, NC (USA)	23 April 2022
13	10.88	+0.5	Tamara Clark	United States	Hayward Field, Eugene, OR (USA)	24 June 2022
13	10.88	+0.9	Kemba Nelson	Jamaica	National Stadium, Kingston (JAM)	24 June 2022
15	10.89	+0.6	Mujinga Kambundji	Switzerland	Letzigrund, Zürich (SUI)	24 June 2022
16	10.90	+1.0	Abby Steiner	United States	Hayward Field, Eugene, OR (USA)	9 June 2022
16	10.90	+1.1	Daryll Neita	United Kingdom	Alexander Stadium, Birmingham (GBR)	3 August 2022
18	10.92	+0.6	Shania Collins	United States	Billy J. Murphy Track and Field Complex, Memphis, TN (USA)	30 July 2022
19	10.93	+2.0	Favour Ofili	Nigeria	Hayward Field, Eugene, OR (USA)	30 April 2022
20	10.94	+2.0	Michelle-Lee Ahye	Trinidad and Tobago	JSerra Catholic HS, San Juan Capistrano, CA (USA)	7 May 2022
20	10.94	+1.8	Celera Barnes	United States	Hayward Field, Eugene, OR (USA)	24 June 2022
20	10.94	+0.9	Briana Williams	Jamaica	National Stadium, Kingston (JAM)	24 June 2022
23	10.95	+0.9	Kevona Davis	Jamaica	Terry & Linda Fuller T&F Complex, Lubbock, TX (USA)	14 May 2022
23	10.95	+1.4	Marybeth Sant-Price	United States	Vanderbilt Track, Nashville, TN (USA)	5 June 2022
23	10.95	+0.5	Javianne Oliver	United States	Hayward Field, Eugene, OR (USA)	24 June 2022
23	10.95	+0.4	Murielle Ahouré-Demps	Ivory Coast	Hasely Crawford Stadium, Port-of-Spain (TTO)	25 June 2022
23	10.95	-0.1	Tina Clayton	Jamaica	Pascual Guerrero Stadium, Cali (COL)	3 August 2022
28	10.96	+1.8	Brittany Brown	United States	Hayward Field, Eugene, OR (USA)	24 June 2022
28	10.96	+1.8	Teahna Daniels	United States	Hayward Field, Eugene, OR (USA)	24 June 2022
30	10.97	+1.6	Christine Mboma	Namibia	National Stadium, Gaborone (BOT)	30 April 2022
30	10.97	+1.3	Natalliah Whyte	Jamaica	Jax Track at Hodges Stadium, Jacksonville, FL (USA)	30 April 2022
30	10.97	+0.6	Nzubechi Grace Nwokocha	Nigeria	Hayward Field, Eugene, OR (USA)	9 June 2022
33	10.98	+2.0	Morolake Akinosun	United States	JSerra Catholic HS, San Juan Capistrano, CA (USA)	7 May 2022
33	10.98	-0.2	Anthonique Strachan	Bahamas	Hayward Field, Eugene, OR (USA)	17 July 2022
35	10.99	+1.0	Rosemary Chukwuma	Nigeria	Hayward Field, Eugene, OR (USA	9 June 2022
35	10.99	+1.8	Kayla White	United States	Hayward Field, Eugene, OR (USA	24 June 2022
35	10.99	+0.8	Gina Lückenkemper	Germany	Olympiastadion, Berlin (GER)	25 June 2022
38	11.00	+1.6	Gabrielle Thomas	United States	Hilmer Lodge Stadium, Walnut, CA (USA)	16 April 2022
38	11.00	+0.5	Jenna Prandini	United States	Hayward Field, Eugene, OR (USA)	24 June 2022
40	11.02	-0.4	Bassant Hemida	Egypt	Moi International Sports Centre, Kasarani, Nairobi (KEN)	7 May 2022
41	11.04	+0.5	Mikiah Brisco	United States	LSU Bernie Moore Stadium, Baton Rouge, LA (USA)	9 April 2022
42	11.05	+1.0	Vitoria Cristina Rosa	Brazil	COTP Stadium, São Paulo (BRA)	1 May 2022
42	11.05	+0.9	Edidiong Odiong	Bahrain	Morris Williams T&F Stadium, Durham, NC (USA)	14 May 2022
42	11.05	+0.5	Ewa Swoboda	Poland	Stade Charléty, Paris (FRA)	18 June 2022
42	11.05	+0.6	Kiara Parker	United States	Billy J. Murphy Track and Field Complex, Memphis, TN (USA)	30 July 2022
46	11.06	+2.0	Destiny Smith-Barnett	United States	JSerra Catholic HS, San Juan Capistrano, CA (USA)	7 May 2022
46	11.06	+0.9	Caira Pettway	United States	Terry & Linda Fuller T&F Complex, Lubbock, TX (USA)	14 May 2022
46	11.06	+1.2	Diana Vaisman	Israel	Stade de La Charrière, La Chaux-de-Fonds (SUI)	3 July 2022
46	11.06	+1.3	Natasha Morrison	Jamaica	Bregyó Athletic Center, Székesfehérvár (HUN)	8 August 2022
50	11.07	+1.9	Aminatou Seyni	Niger	Côte d'Or National Sports Complex, St Pierre (MRI)	8 June 2022
50	11.07	+1.8	Carina Horn	South Africa	Altamira estadioa, Ordizia (ESP)	18 June 2022
50	11.07	+1.6	Maria Isabel Pérez	Spain	Estadio Enrique Lopez Cuenca, Nerja (ESP)	25 June 2022
50	11.07	+0.4	Jasmine Abrams	Guyana	Hasely Crawford Stadium, Port-of-Spain (TTO)	25 June 2022
54	11.08	+0.1	Gina Bass	Gambia	Côte d'Or National Sports Complex, St Pierre (MRI)	8 June 2022
54	11.08	+0.4	Joella Lloyd	Antigua and Barbuda	Hayward Field, Eugene, OR (USA)	9 June 2022
54	11.08	+0.7	Zoe Hobbs	New Zealand	Hayward Field, Eugene, OR (USA)	16 July 2022
54	11.08	+1.3	English Gardner	United States	Sportcentrum, Pápa (HUN)	6 September 2022
58	11.09	+1.4	Shockoria Wallace	Jamaica	Jamaica College Ashenheim Stadium, Kingston (JAM)	8 June 2022
58	11.09	+1.1	Shannon Ray	United States	Billy J. Murphy Track and Field Complex, Memphis, TN (USA)	30 July 2022
58	11.09	+0.1	Tima Seikeseye Godbless	Nigeria	Pascual Guerrero Stadium, Cali (COL)	2 August 2022

== See also ==
- 2020 in 100 metres
- 2021 in 100 metres
