= John Kincaide Stadium =

Multi-use stadium in Dallas, Texas

Coordinates: 32.6385°N 96.8426°W

John Kincaide Stadium is a 15,000-seat multi-use stadium in Dallas, Texas owned and operated by the Dallas Independent School District. It opened in 2005.

In 2023, a track at this stadium was renamed the Sha'Carri Richardson Track.

Kincaide Stadium is part of the Jesse Owens Memorial Complex and is used for football, soccer, and athletics. It serves as home to Carter and Kimball High Schools.
