= 2019 in 100 metres =

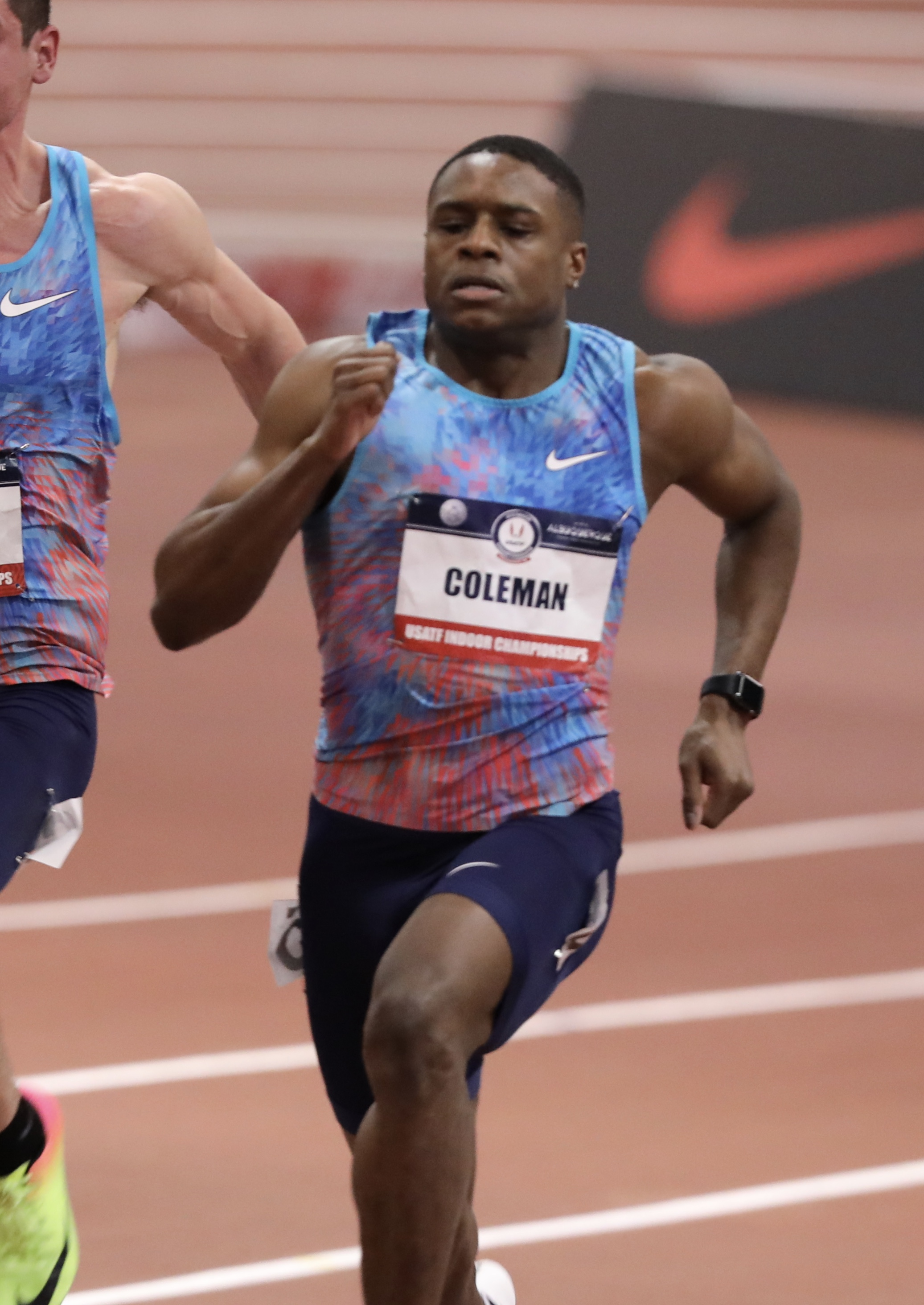
The American Christian Coleman, World Leader (WL) in 100 metres 2019 men's outdoor season.

In 2019, in the sport of athletics, the foremost 100 metres races were held at the 2019 World Athletics Championships. In the men's World Championships final, the American Christian Coleman won his first world title with a time of 9.76 seconds. In the women's World Championships final, Jamaica's Shelly-Ann Fraser-Pryce won her fourth world 100 m title with a time of 10.71 seconds.

In the 2019 Diamond League global series of meetings, American Noah Lyles won the men's final and Great Britain's Dina Asher-Smith won the women's final. Regional 100 m titles decided that year included the Universiade, African Games, Pan American Games, European Games, Asian Championships, and South American Championships. The 2019 World Para Athletics Championships featured 100 m finals in 17 men's and 15 women's categories.

Both World Championships winning times were the fastest recorded in the men's and women's divisions that year. No senior world or continental records in the 100 m were beaten in 2019. Significant national records set that year included Abdul Hakim Sani Brown's run of 9.97 seconds for the men's Japanese record and Dina Asher-Smith's women's British record of 10.83.

In the under-20 age category, Lalu Muhammad Zohri was the fastest man that year with 10.03 (a senior Indonesian record) and Sha'Carri Richardson of the United States was the fastest under-20 woman with 10.75 (a world under-20 record and third in the senior rankings). In the under-18 category, Jamaicans Briana Williams (11.02) and Conroy Jones (10.32) were the fastest that year.

Coleman's world title generated some controversy as he had successfully appealed a doping ban by the United States Anti-Doping Agency that season due to his missing three tests within a twelve-month period.

== International gold medalists ==
Athlete	Nation	Competition	Division
Christian Coleman	United States	World Championships	Men
Shelly-Ann Fraser-Pryce	Jamaica	World Championships	Women
Paulo André de Oliveira	Brazil	Universiade	Men
Dutee Chand	India	Universiade	Women
Abdo Barkha	Bahrain	Arab Championships	Men
Hajar Al-Khaldi	Bahrain	Arab Championships	Women
Yoshihide Kiryū	Japan	Asian Championships	Men
Olga Safronova	Kazakhstan	Asian Championships	Women
Emre Zafer Barnes	Turkey	Balkan Championships	Men
Ivet Lalova-Collio	Bulgaria	Balkan Championships	Women
Edward Osei-Nketia	New Zealand	Oceanian Championships	Men
Zoe Hobbs	New Zealand	Oceanian Championships	Women
Rodrigo do Nascimento	Brazil	South American Championships	Men
Vitória Cristina Rosa	Brazil	South American Championships	Women
Raymond Ekevwo	Nigeria	African Games	Men
Marie-Josée Ta Lou	Ivory Coast	African Games	Women
Carlos Nascimento	Portugal	European Games	Men
Maja Mihalinec Zidar	Slovenia	European Games	Women
Mike Rodgers	United States	Pan American Games	Men
Elaine Thompson	Jamaica	Pan American Games	Women
Muhammad Haiqal Hanafi	Malaysia	Southeast Asian Games	Men
Lê Tú Chinh	Vietnam	Southeast Asian Games	Women
Hassan Saaid	Maldives	South Asian Games	Men
Archana Suseendran	India	South Asian Games	Women

== Records ==
Standing records prior to the 2019 season
Men's World record	Usain Bolt (JAM)	9.58	Berlin, Germany	16 August 2009
Women's World record	Florence Griffith Joyner (USA)	10.49	Indianapolis, United States	16 July 1988

== Men top 60 ==
#	Time	Wind	Athlete	Country	Venue	Date
1	9.76	+0.6	Christian Coleman	United States	Khalifa International Stadium, Doha (QAT)	28 September 2019
2	9.86	+0.9	Noah Lyles	United States	Shanghai Stadium, Shanghai (CHN)	18 May 2019
2	9.86	+0.8	Divine Oduduru	Nigeria	Austin, TX (USA)	07 June 2019
4	9.87	-0.1	Justin Gatlin	United States	Cobb Track and Angell Field - Stanford University, Palo Alto, CA (USA)	30 June 2019
5	9.90	+0.6	André De Grasse	Canada	Khalifa International Stadium, Doha (QAT)	28 September 2019
6	9.93	+0.8	Cravon Gillespie	United States	Austin, TX (USA)	07 June 2019
6	9.93	+0.5	Akani Simbine	South Africa	Olympic Stadium, London (GBR)	20 July 2019
6	9.93	+1.9	Arthur Cissé	Ivory Coast	Leverkusen (GER)	24 July 2019
9	9.95	+0.5	Zharnel Hughes	United Kingdom	Olympic Stadium, London (GBR)	20 July 2019
10	9.96	+0.4	Yohan Blake	Jamaica	Kingston (JAM)	21 June 2019
10	9.96	+1.7	Aaron Brown	Canada	Montréal (CAN)	26 July 2019
10	9.96	+1.6	Raymond Ekevwo	Nigeria	Complexe Sportif Prince Moulay Abdellah, Rabat (MAR)	27 August 2019
13	9.97	+0.9	Reece Prescod	United Kingdom	Shanghai Stadium, Shanghai (CHN)	18 May 2019
13	9.97	+0.8	Abdul Hakim Sani Brown	Japan	Austin, TX (USA)	07 June 2019
13	9.97	+1.6	Mike Rodgers	United States	Estadio Vallehermoso, Madrid (ESP)	25 August 2019
16	9.98	+1.0	Roberto Skyers	Cuba	Camagüey (CUB)	22 February 2019
16	9.98	+1.3	Mario Burke	Barbados	Austin, TX (USA)	05 June 2019
16	9.98	+0.5	Yuki Koike	Japan	Olympic Stadium, London (GBR)	20 July 2019
19	9.99	+1.8	Isiah Young	United States	Montverde, FL (USA)	06 July 2019
20	10.00	+0.4	Tyquendo Tracey	Jamaica	Kingston (JAM)	21 June 2019
21	10.01	+1.7	Yoshihide Kiryu	Japan	Nagai Stadium, Osaka (JPN)	19 May 2019
21	10.01	+1.3	Devin Quinn	United States	Austin, TX (USA)	05 June 2019
21	10.01	+1.3	Joseph Paul Amoah	Ghana	Austin, TX (USA)	05 June 2019
21	10.01	+0.9	Zhenye Xie	China	Bislett Stadion, Oslo (NOR)	13 June 2019
21	10.01	+1.1	Waseem Williams	Jamaica	Querétaro (MEX)	05 July 2019
21	10.01	+1.1	Samson Colebrooke	Bahamas	Querétaro (MEX)	05 July 2019
21	10.01	+1.8	Emmanuel Matadi	Liberia	Montverde, FL (USA)	06 July 2019
28	10.02	+1.5	Paulo André Camilo De Oliveira	Brazil	Azusa, CA (USA)	19 April 2019
28	10.02	+1.9	Kemar Hyman	Cayman Islands	Windsor (CAN)	18 May 2019
28	10.02	+1.9	Asafa Powell	Jamaica	Leverkusen (GER)	24 July 2019
28	10.02	+1.4	Jimmy Vicaut	France	St-Etienne (FRA)	26 July 2019
28	10.02	+1.6	Usheoritse Itsekiri	Nigeria	Complexe Sportif Prince Moulay Abdellah, Rabat (MAR)	27 August 2019
33	10.03	+1.2	Demek Kemp	United States	Columbia, SC (USA)	13 April 2019
33	10.03	+1.7	Lalu Muhammad Zohri	Indonesia	Nagai Stadium, Osaka (JPN)	19 May 2019
33	10.03	+1.7	Lamont Marcell Jacobs	Italy	Padova (ITA)	16 July 2019
33	10.03	-0.3	Hassan Taftian	Iran	Stade Charléty, Paris (FRA)	24 August 2019
37	10.04	+2.0	Reynier Mena	Cuba	Camagüey (CUB)	22 February 2019
37	10.04	+0.5	Adam Gemili	United Kingdom	Olympic Stadium, London (GBR)	20 July 2019
39	10.05	+0.5	Simon Magakwe	South Africa	Germiston (RSA)	25 April 2019
39	10.05	+1.2	Rodney Rowe	United States	Greensboro, NC (USA)	04 May 2019
39	10.05	+0.9	Bingtian Su	China	Shanghai Stadium, Shanghai (CHN)	18 May 2019
39	10.05	+1.3	Davon Demoss	United States	Austin, TX (USA)	05 June 2019
39	10.05	+1.8	Christopher Belcher	United States	Montverde, FL (USA)	06 July 2019
44	10.06	+0.8	Andre Ewers	Jamaica	Charlottesville, VA (USA)	11 May 2019
44	10.06	+0.8	Bryand Rincher	United States	Austin, TX (USA)	07 June 2019
46	10.07	+0.1	Cejhae Greene	Netherlands Antilles	La Chaux-de-Fonds (SUI)	30 June 2019
46	10.07	+1.6	Vitor Hugo Dos Santos	Brazil	CNDA, Bragança Paulista (BRA)	29 August 2019
46	10.07	+0.6	Filippo Tortu	Italy	Khalifa International Stadium, Doha (QAT)	28 September 2019
49	10.08	+2.0	Rohan Browning	Australia	Brisbane (AUS)	23 March 2019
49	10.08	+1.8	Mustaqeem Williams	United States	Fayetteville, AR (USA)	11 May 2019
49	10.08	+0.1	Alex Wilson	Switzerland	La Chaux-de-Fonds (SUI)	30 June 2019
49	10.08	+0.9	Thando Dlodlo	South Africa	Trieste (ITA)	06 July 2019
49	10.08	+1.9	Ojie Edoburun	United Kingdom	Leverkusen (GER)	24 July 2019
54	10.09	+1.5	Raheem Chambers	Jamaica	Charlottesville, VA (USA)	10 May 2019
54	10.09	+1.3	Mckinley West	United States	Austin, TX (USA)	05 June 2019
54	10.09	+1.7	Jeff Demps	United States	Carl Lewis TF and Soccer Complex, Houston, TX (USA)	12 July 2019
57	10.10	+0.3	Kendal Williams	United States	Clermont, FL (USA)	05 May 2019
57	10.10	+0.4	Rasheed Dwyer	Jamaica	Kingston (JAM)	21 June 2019
57	10.10	+1.1	Ameer Webb	United States	Phoenix, AZ (USA)	10 July 2019
57	10.10	0.0	Rodrigo Do Nascimento	Brazil	São Paulo (BRA)	18 August 2019

== Women top 60 ==
#	Time	Wind	Athlete	Country	Venue	Date
1	10.71	+0.1	Shelly-Ann Fraser-Pryce	Jamaica	Khalifa International Stadium, Doha (QAT)	29 September 2019
2	10.73	+0.6	Elaine Thompson	Jamaica	Kingston (JAM)	21 June 2019
3	10.75	+1.6	Sha'Carri Richardson	United States	Austin, TX (USA)	08 June 2019
4	10.83	+0.1	Dina Asher-Smith	United Kingdom	Khalifa International Stadium, Doha (QAT)	29 September 2019
5	10.85	-0.3	Marie-Josée Ta Lou	Ivory Coast	Khalifa International Stadium, Doha (QAT)	28 September 2019
6	10.95	+1.6	Kayla White	United States	Austin, TX (USA)	08 June 2019
7	10.98	+1.6	Twanisha Terry	United States	Austin, TX (USA)	08 June 2019
8	10.99	+1.4	Teahna Daniels	United States	Sacramento, CA (USA)	24 May 2019
9	11.00	-0.1	Mujinga Kambundji	Switzerland	Stadion Schützenmatte, Basel (SUI)	23 August 2019
10	11.01	+0.4	Carina Horn	South Africa	Estadio Vallehermoso, Madrid (ESP)	25 August 2019
11	11.02	+1.6	Kiara Parker	United States	Austin, TX (USA)	08 June 2019
11	11.02	+0.8	Briana Williams	Jamaica	Albuquerque, NM (USA)	08 June 2019
11	11.02	+0.1	Murielle Ahouré	Ivory Coast	Khalifa International Stadium, Doha (QAT)	29 September 2019
14	11.03	+0.2	Aleia Hobbs	United States	Shanghai Stadium, Shanghai (CHN)	18 May 2019
15	11.04	+1.6	Kiara Grant	Jamaica	Austin, TX (USA)	08 June 2019
15	11.04	+0.6	Jonielle Smith	Jamaica	Kingston (JAM)	21 June 2019
15	11.04	+1.9	Tebogo Mamathu	South Africa	La Chaux-de-Fonds (SUI)	30 June 2019
15	11.04	+1.9	Yongli Wei	China	La Chaux-de-Fonds (SUI)	30 June 2019
15	11.04	+0.2	Dafne Schippers	Netherlands	Stade Olympique de la Pontaise, Lausanne (SUI)	05 July 2019
15	11.04	+0.4	Manqi Ge	China	Stade Olympique de la Pontaise, Lausanne (SUI)	05 July 2019
15	11.04	+1.0	Tynia Gaither	Bahamas	Montverde, FL (USA)	06 July 2019
15	11.04	+0.7	Blessing Okagbare	Nigeria	Olympic Stadium, London (GBR)	21 July 2019
23	11.06	+0.6	Anglerne Annelus	United States	Austin, TX (USA)	06 June 2019
24	11.07	+0.7	Ewa Swoboda	Poland	Olympiastadion, Berlin (GER)	01 September 2019
25	11.08	+1.0	Caitland Smith	United States	Montverde, FL (USA)	06 July 2019
25	11.08	+0.4	Ivet Lalova-Collio	Bulgaria	Estadio Vallehermoso, Madrid (ESP)	25 August 2019
27	11.09	+0.6	Natalliah Whyte	Jamaica	Kingston (JAM)	21 June 2019
27	11.09	+1.9	Imani Lansiquot	United Kingdom	La Chaux-de-Fonds (SUI)	30 June 2019
27	11.09	+1.0	Dezerea Bryant	United States	Montverde, FL (USA)	06 July 2019
27	11.09	+0.1	Tatjana Pinto	Germany	Berlin (GER)	03 August 2019
27	11.09	+0.4	Tori Bowie	United States	Estadio Vallehermoso, Madrid (ESP)	25 August 2019
32	11.10	+1.9	Gabrielle Thomas	United States	Columbia, SC (USA)	13 April 2019
32	11.10	+0.7	Jenna Prandini	United States	Fayetteville, AR (USA)	26 April 2019
32	11.10	+0.7	Asha Philip	United Kingdom	Olympiastadion, Berlin (GER)	01 September 2019
35	11.11	+0.6	Ka'Tia Seymour	United States	Austin, TX (USA)	06 June 2019
36	11.12	-0.3	Daryll Neita	United Kingdom	Khalifa International Stadium, Doha (QAT)	28 September 2019
37	11.13	+1.9	Salomé Kora	Switzerland	La Chaux-de-Fonds (SUI)	30 June 2019
37	11.13	+1.9	Marije Van Hunenstijn	Netherlands	La Chaux-de-Fonds (SUI)	30 June 2019
37	11.13	-1.2	Gina Bass	Gambia	Complexe Sportif Prince Moulay Abdellah, Rabat (MAR)	27 August 2019
37	11.13	+0.7	Xiaojing Liang	China	Olympiastadion, Berlin (GER)	01 September 2019
41	11.14	+0.7	Kelly-Ann Baptiste	Trinidad and Tobago	Clermont, FL (USA)	05 May 2019
41	11.14	+0.7	Gina Lückenkemper	Germany	Olympic Stadium, London (GBR)	21 July 2019
43	11.15	+2.0	Tawanna Meadows	United States	Lubbock, TX (USA)	04 May 2019
43	11.15	+0.2	Laura Müller	Germany	Rehlingen (GER)	09 June 2019
45	11.16	+0.2	Vitoria Cristina Rosa	Brazil	Shanghai Stadium, Shanghai (CHN)	18 May 2019
45	11.16	+0.6	Lanae-Tava Thomas	United States	Austin, TX (USA)	06 June 2019
45	11.16	-2.4	English Gardner	United States	Drake Stadium, Des Moines, IA (USA)	26 July 2019
45	11.16	+1.5	Crystal Emmanuel	Canada	Montréal (CAN)	26 July 2019
49	11.17	+1.0	Ashanti Moore	Jamaica	Kingston (JAM)	29 March 2019
49	11.17	+1.8	Olga Safronova	Kazakhstan	Doha (QAT)	22 April 2019
49	11.17	+2.0	Jodie Williams	United Kingdom	Lubbock, TX (USA)	04 May 2019
49	11.17	+0.7	Cambrea Sturgis	United States	Jacksonville, FL (USA)	24 May 2019
49	11.17	+1.0	Barbara Pierre	United States	Montverde, FL (USA)	06 July 2019
49	11.17	+1.2	Kamaria Durant	Trinidad and Tobago	Port-of-Spain (TTO)	27 July 2019
49	11.17	+0.5	Morolake Akinosun	United States	Khalifa International Stadium, Doha (QAT)	29 September 2019
56	11.18	+0.6	Natasha Morrison	Jamaica	Kingston (JAM)	21 June 2019
56	11.18	+1.0	Kortnei Johnson	United States	Montverde, FL (USA)	06 July 2019
58	11.19	+1.4	Kevona Davis	Jamaica	Kingston (JAM)	29 March 2019
58	11.19	+1.1	Kandace Thomas	United States	Canyon, TX (USA)	05 April 2019
58	11.19	+2.0	Brandee Presley	United States	Hollywood, FL (USA)	22 June 2019

== See also ==
- 2018 in 100 metres
- 2020 in 100 metres
