= Sha'Carri Richardson =

American sprinter (born 2000)

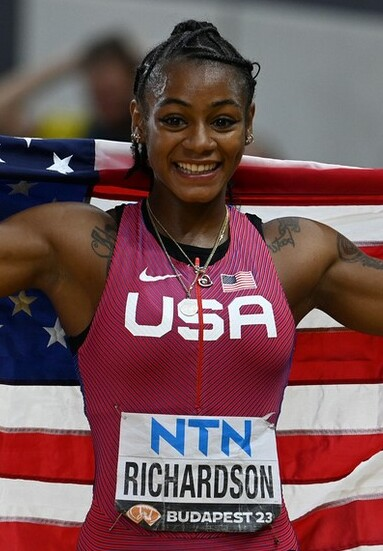
- Richardson in 2023

Personal information
- Born: March 25, 2000 (age 26) Dallas, Texas, U.S.
- Agent: Renaldo Nehemiah
- Height: 5 ft 1 in (155 cm)

Sport
- Country: United States
- Sport: Track and field
- Events: 100 m, 200 m, 4 × 100 m
- College team: LSU Lady Tigers (2018–2019)
- Turned pro: June 2019
- Coached by: Dennis Mitchell

Achievements and titles
- Highest world ranking: 1st (100 m, 2023)
- Personal bests: 100 m: 10.65 (Budapest 2023); 200 m: 21.92 (Budapest 2023); Indoors; 60 m: 7.20i (Fayetteville 2019); 200 m: 23.08i (Fayetteville 2019)
Medal record
Women's athletics
Representing the United States
Olympic Games
Gold medal – first place	2024 Paris	4 × 100 m relay
Silver medal – second place	2024 Paris	100 m
World Championships
Gold medal – first place	2023 Budapest	100 m
Gold medal – first place	2023 Budapest	4 × 100 m relay
Gold medal – first place	2025 Tokyo	4 × 100 m relay
Bronze medal – third place	2023 Budapest	200 m
World Ultimate Championship
Third place	2026 Budapest	100 m
Pan American U20 Championships
Gold medal – first place	2017 Trujillo	4 × 100 m relay

Sha'Carri LaNay Richardson (/ʃəˈkæriː/ shə-CARE-ee; born March 25, 2000) is an American track and field sprinter and Olympic champion who competes in the 100 metres and 200 metres. Richardson rose to fame in 2019 as a freshman at Louisiana State University, running 10.75 seconds to break the 100 m collegiate record at the NCAA Division I Championships. This winning time made her one of the ten fastest women in history at 19 years old.

In April 2021, Richardson ran a new personal best of 10.72 seconds, becoming the sixth-fastest woman of all time (at the time) and the fourth-fastest American woman in history. She qualified for the 2020 Summer Olympics after winning the women's 100-metre dash with 10.86 in the United States Olympic Trials. On July 1, it was reported that Richardson had tested positive for cannabis use following her 100 m final at the U.S. Trials, invalidating her win and making her ineligible to compete in the 100 m at the Olympics. After successfully completing a counseling program, she accepted a one-month period of ineligibility that began on June 28, 2021. In July 2023, she became the US national champion in the women's 100 metres at the 2023 USA Outdoor Track and Field Championships, running 10.82 seconds.

Richardson won gold in the 100 m at the 2023 World Championships in Budapest, beating Shericka Jackson and Shelly-Ann Fraser-Pryce in a new championships record time of 10.65 seconds. On the penultimate day of the 2023 World Championships, she also won gold as part of Team USA in the women's 4 × 100 m relay final with a championship record of 41.03 seconds. On June 22, 2024, Richardson defended her title as the US national champion in the 100-metre sprint event by winning the women's 100 m final in 10.71 seconds (WL), qualifying for the 2024 Summer Olympics in Paris, France, where she won the silver medal in the 100 m and gold in the 4 × 100 relay.

== Childhood and early career ==
Richardson was born in Dallas, Texas. She was raised by her grandmother, Betty Harp, and an aunt. She graduated from Carter High School, where she ran track and won Texas state titles in the 100 m and 200 m.

=== 2016–2017: Junior career ===
As a teenager, Richardson won the 100 m title at the AAU Junior Olympics — the largest national multi-sport event for youth in the United States — in 2016, then another title at the USATF Junior Olympics in 2017. She made her international debut at the 2017 Pan American U20 Athletics Championships, where she won a gold medal in the 4 × 100 meter relay alongside Gabriele Cunningham, Rebekah Smith, and Tara Davis.

=== 2018–2019: Louisiana State University ===
In 2018, Richardson enrolled at Louisiana State University and began competing for the LSU Lady Tigers track and field team. She was a finalist in the 60-meter dash at the 2019 NCAA Division I Indoor Championships.

At the 2019 NCAA Division I Outdoor Championships, the 19-year-old completed the second-best female one-day double in history after Merlene Ottey, breaking two world U20 records. She won the 100 m with a time of 10.75 s, setting a collegiate record and improving Marlies Göhr's 42-year-old world U20 best. In the 200 m, she placed runner-up by less than one hundredth of a second in a time of 22.17 s, breaking Allyson Felix's record set at the 2004 Athens Olympics. She also ran in the 4 × 100 m relay which finished second.

Four days after the NCAA Championships, she announced she would forgo collegiate eligibility after her first year, and sign a professional contract. She trains with former Olympic sprinter Dennis Mitchell and is sponsored by Nike.

== Professional career ==
=== 2021: Tokyo Olympics and suspension ===
Richardson qualified for the 2020 Summer Olympics with a 100-meter time of 10.77 seconds at the 2020 United States Olympic Trials. It was 0.13 seconds faster than Javianne Oliver, who finished second. A urine sample that she submitted tested positive for THC metabolites indicating recent cannabis use, which put her participation in the Olympics in doubt. After successfully completing a counseling program, she accepted a one-month suspension by the United States Anti-Doping Agency (USADA) that began on June 28, 2021. While Richardson was ineligible for the Olympic 100 meters due to the suspension ending on July 27, 2021, she could have been eligible for the women's 4 × 100 relay scheduled for August 5, 2021. However, she was not selected, thereby missing the Olympics entirely.

Richardson stated that she took the drug to cope with the pressure of qualifying for the Olympics while mourning the recent death of her biological mother. Her suspension was criticized by many individuals and organizations in favor of liberalizing cannabis policies, including NORML, members of the Congressional Cannabis Caucus, and other members of Congress. U.S. President Joe Biden also suggested that drug-testing rules governing athletes could be changed. USADA responded to the criticism by pointing out that as a signatory to the World Anti-Doping Code, it has an obligation to enforce it in the United States. Furthermore, they stated that changing those rules might be problematic, as the vast majority of the world's nation states consider consuming marijuana a criminal offense. In response to the controversy, in September 2021, the World Anti-Doping Agency announced that it would conduct a review regarding the prohibited status of cannabis. Cannabis has remained a prohibited drug for Olympic athletes since 1999, though in 2013 the World Anti-Doping Agency increased the level of THC metabolite allowed from 15 ng/mL to 150 ng/mL.

Richardson returned to the track at the 2021 Prefontaine Classic, placing ninth – last place – with a time of 11.14 seconds. The Tokyo medalists, Jamaicans Elaine Thompson-Herah, Shelly-Ann Fraser-Pryce and Shericka Jackson, repeated their placements.

=== 2022-2023: World 100 m champion ===
Richardson won the 200 m and placed second behind Aleia Hobbs over 100 m at the New York Grand Prix on 12 June 2022, running times of 22.38 s and 10.85 s, respectively. At the USA Outdoor Track and Field Championships, she was eliminated in the heats of the 100 m and the semi-finals of the 200 m, therefore not qualifying for the 2022 World Championships.

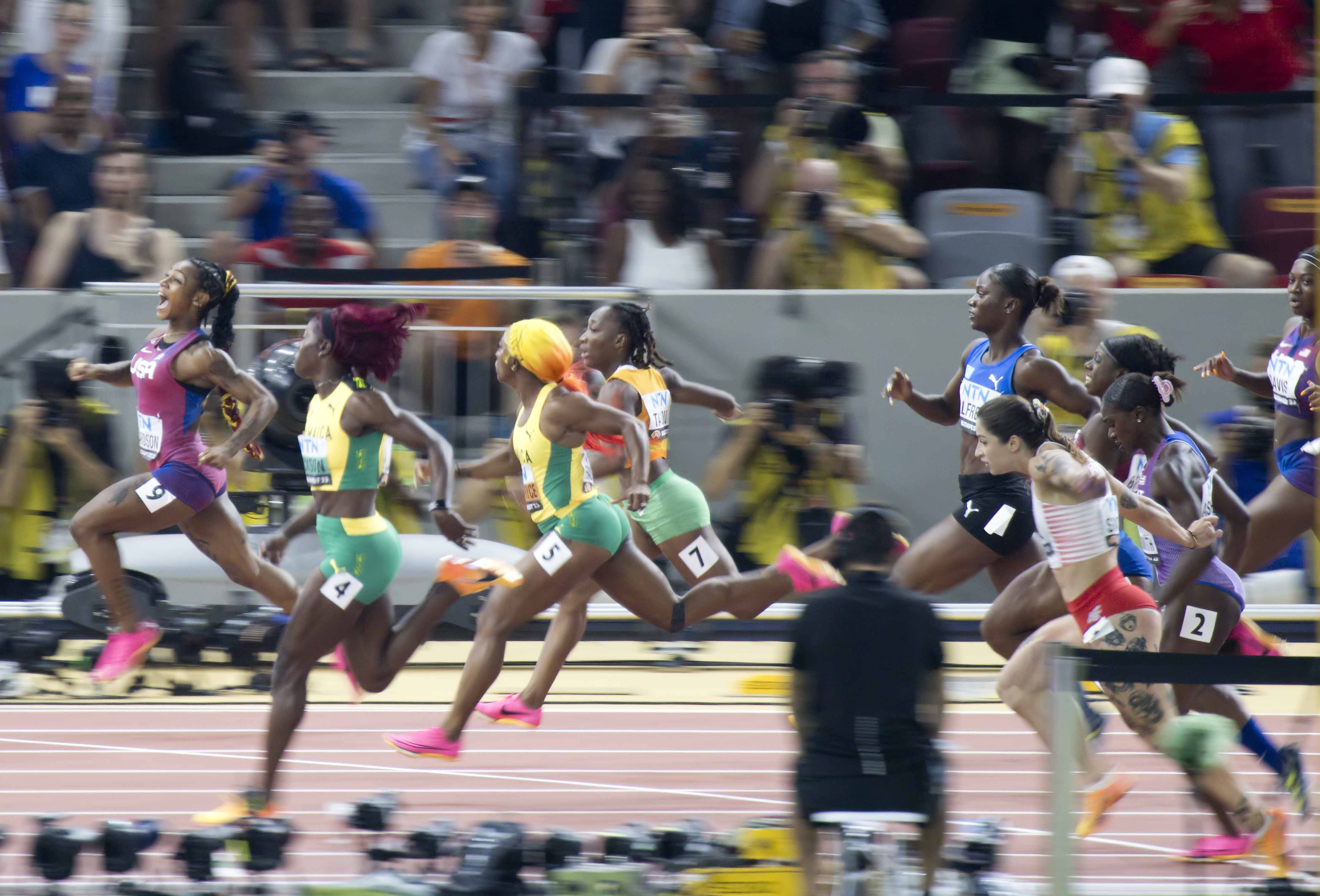
Richardson wins the 100 m final at the 2023 World Championships

On April 8, 2023, she ran the fourth-fastest 100 m by a woman in all conditions, clocking 10.57 seconds with a strong, illegal 4.1 m/s tailwind to win the women's final at the Miramar Invitational. It converts to 10.77 s in still conditions. In May 2023, she secured her first Diamond League victory, winning the 100 m in Doha with a new meeting record of 10.76 s (+0.9 m/s).

In July 2023, Richardson participated at the 2023 USA Outdoor Track and Field Championships in Eugene, Oregon. On July 7, Richardson became the US national champion in the 100-metre sprint event by winning the women's 100 m final in 10.82 seconds, qualifying for the 2023 World Athletics Championships in Budapest. On the third day of the Championships in Budapest, she won her first major individual title on the international stage, winning gold in the women's 100-metre sprint event in a championship record of 10.65 seconds. On August 25, she won bronze in the women's 200 m final in 21.92 seconds, finishing behind USA teammate Gabrielle Thomas (21.81), and defending women's 200 m world champion Shericka Jackson (21:41 CR). She would also go on to win gold as part of Team USA in the women's 4 × 100 m relay final with a championship record of 41.03 seconds. Her relay time of 9.65 seconds was the fastest in history. Sha'Carri's teammates in this event were Tamari Davis, Twanisha Terry, and Gabrielle Thomas.

=== 2024: Olympic gold and silver medals ===
On 25 May, Richardson won over 100 m at the Prefontaine Classic in Eugene, Oregon, running a time of 10.83 seconds. "I feel great about my race. I feel like I'm continuing to grow and develop into a mature young lady and a mature athlete", Richardson told the media following her victory.

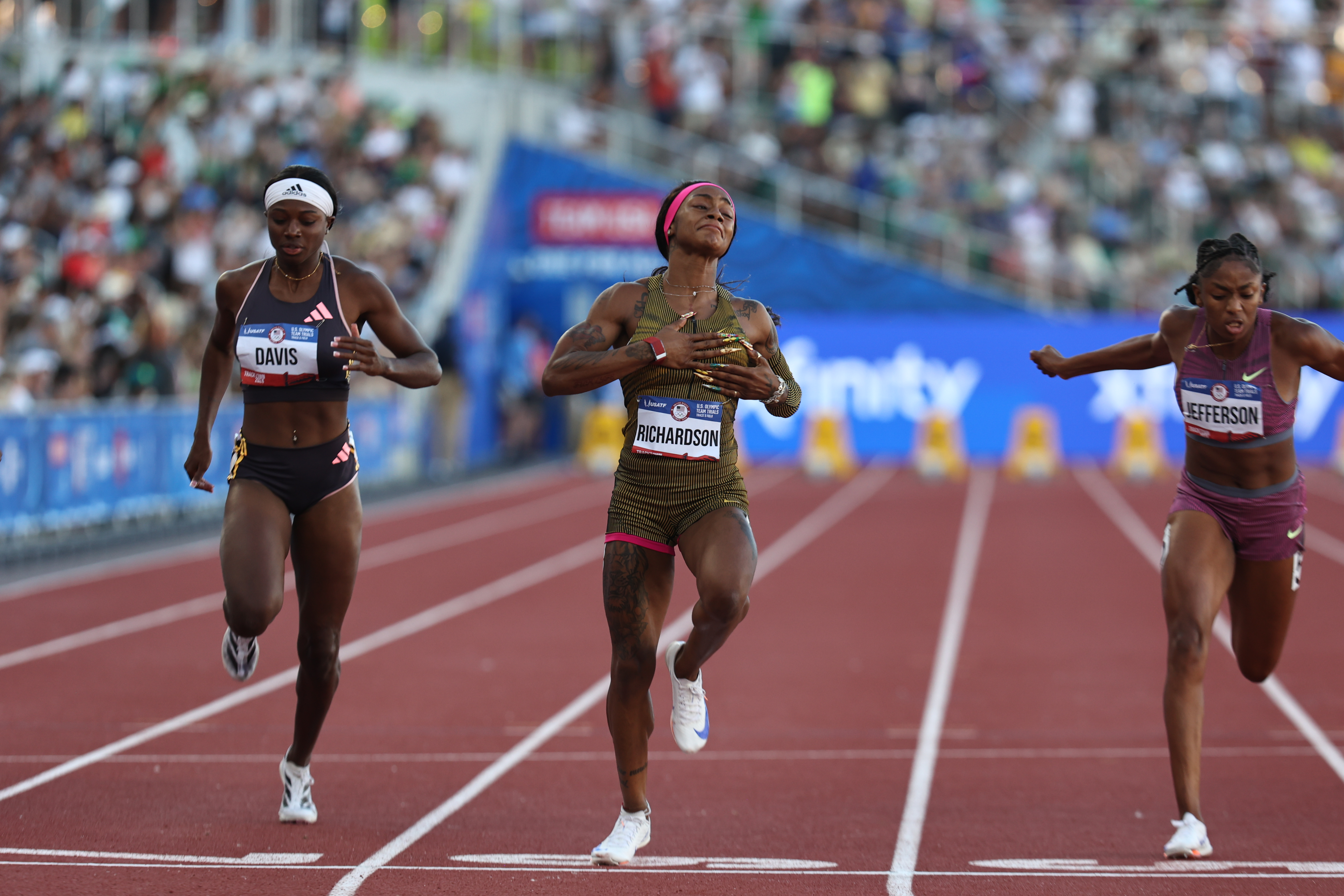
Richardson wins the 100 m final at the 2024 USA Outdoor Track and Field Championships.

At the USA Outdoor Track and Field Championships in Eugene, Oregon, Richardson defended her title in the women's 100-meter sprint event, winning the final in 10.71 seconds on June 22, and qualifying for the event at the 2024 Summer Olympics in Paris. She did not qualify for the 200 m, however, finishing fourth in the final of the qualifier. In the Olympic 100 m final, Richardson finished second behind Saint Lucia's Julien Alfred, who had a faster start out of the blocks and never relinquished her lead. In the women's 4 × 100 relay, Richardson ran the race's anchor leg; after a shaky handoff from teammate Gabrielle Thomas, Richardson propelled the U.S. women from third place to first, clinching her first Olympic gold medal. Before crossing the finish line, Richardson turned her head to stare down her closest competitors in a moment that went viral on social media.

=== 2025: World 4 × 100 gold ===
At the start of the year, Richardson suffered an unspecified injury which disrupted her preparations for the season. This led to her finishing in an "uncharacteristic" fourth-place in her season opener at the Golden Grand Prix in Tokyo, running 11.47 s in a race won by Bree Rizzo. In August, she competed at the USA Outdoor Track and Field Championships, where she was eliminated in the heats of the 200 m, failing to qualify for the event at the World Championships.

At the World Championships, she finished fifth in the 100 m final, running a season's best of 10.94 s. Richardson and teammates Melissa Jefferson-Wooden, Kayla White and Twanisha Terry later ran in the women's 4 × 100 m relay, posting a mark of 41.75 seconds to win gold over Jamaica and Germany.

=== 2026 ===
In April, Richardson would travel to Australia to compete in the annual prestigious Easter weekend 120 m sprint known as the Stawell Gift where she emerged victorious.

On July 4, Richardson finished second in the 100 m at the Prefontaine Classic, running 10.79 seconds in a photo finish won by Melissa Jefferson-Wooden in 10.78 seconds.

On July 24, Richardson regained the U.S. 100 m title at the 2026 USA Outdoor Track and Field Championships in New York City, matching her season's best of 10.77 seconds.

In September, Richardson finished third in the 100 m at the inaugural World Athletics Ultimate Championship in Budapest, running 10.76 seconds. Six days later, she won the 100 m at Athlos London in 10.80 seconds.

== Sponsorships ==
Richardson is sponsored by Nike. She wore Nike's Air Zoom Maxfly spikes at the 2023 World Championships in Budapest.

== Legal issues ==
On July 27, 2025, Richardson was arrested after assaulting her boyfriend and fellow sprinter Christian Coleman – shoving him and grabbing off his backpack – at the Seattle–Tacoma International Airport; security camera footage was judged to provide probable cause of fourth-degree domestic violence assault. He declined to press charges, stating he didn't feel she should have been arrested. After being held for over 18 hours, Richardson apologized to Coleman and stated she would "seek help."

On January 29, 2026, Richardson was arrested in Orange County, Florida, accused of dangerous excessive speeding, going 104 mph (167km/h) in a 65 mph (105km/h) zone, changed lanes several times, flashed her lights at other cars and drove too close to other vehicles. Her boyfriend Christian Coleman was also arrested for drug paraphernalia found in his car and resisting arrest.

== Personal life ==
In 2021, a week before her qualifying race for the 2020 Summer Olympics, Richardson's biological mother died. In discussing her suspension for marijuana on The Today Show, Richardson stated she knew nothing of her mother's death until she was asked about it by a reporter.

Richardson is noted for her long nails and colorful hair on the field, and she has stated that her style is inspired by that of Florence Griffith-Joyner. At the September 2021 Met Gala, Richardson wore a custom red and black gown by Jamaican-American designer Edvin Thompson of Theophilio. Richardson has also been described in media coverage as having a flamboyant public image and outspoken personality.

Immediately after her win in June 2021, Richardson, who is bisexual, gave a Twitter shout-out to the LGBTQ community. The same year, she dated a woman outside of the public eye, whom she publicly thanked after making the Olympic team. In 2025, she was rumored to be dating sprinter Christian Coleman. They were later confirmed to be together.

== Athletics achievements ==
Information from her World Athletics profile unless otherwise noted.

=== Personal bests ===
Type	Distance	Time (s)	Wind (m/s)	Venue	Date	Notes
Individual events
Indoor	60 metres	7.20	—N/a	Fayetteville, United States	26 January 2019	
Indoor	200 metres sh	23.08	—N/a	Fayetteville, United States	9 February 2019	
Outdoor	100 metres	10.65	-0.2	Budapest, Hungary	21 August 2023	
Outdoor	200 metres	21.92	+0.1	Budapest, Hungary	25 August 2023	
Outdoor	300 metres	46.65	—N/a	Fort Worth, United States	20 July 2020	
Team events
Outdoor	4 × 100 metres relay	41.03	—N/a	Budapest, Hungary	26 August 2023	
Outdoor	4 × 200 metres relay	1:30.55	—N/a	Austin, United States	26 March 2022	

=== International competitions ===
Representing the United States
Year	Competition	Venue	Position	Event	Time	Notes
2017	Pan American U20 Championships	Trujillo, Peru	1st	4 × 100 m relay	44.07	
2023	World Championships	Budapest, Hungary	1st	100 m	10.65	=WL CR PB
2023	World Championships	Budapest, Hungary	3rd	200 m	21.92	PB
2023	World Championships	Budapest, Hungary	1st	4 × 100 m relay	41.03	CR
2024	Olympic Games	Paris, France	2nd	100 m	10.87	
2024	Olympic Games	Paris, France	1st	4 × 100 m relay	41.78	SB
2025	World Championships	Tokyo, Japan	5th	100 m	10.94	SB
2025	World Championships	Tokyo, Japan	1st	4 × 100 m relay	41.75	
2026	World Ultimate Championship	Budapest, Hungary	3rd	100 m	10.76	

=== Circuit wins ===
- Diamond League
  - 2023: Doha Diamond League (WL MR), Chorzów Kamila Skolimowska Memorial, Zürich Weltklasse
  - 2024: Prefontaine Classic, Zürich Weltklasse

=== Other competition wins ===
- 2026: Stawell Gift: Stawell, Victoria, Australia

=== National titles ===
- NCAA Division I Women's Outdoor Track and Field Championships
  - 100 m: 2019
- AAU Junior Olympics
  - 100 m: 2016, 2017
- USA Outdoor Track and Field Championships
  - 100 m: 2023, 2024, 2026

== Honours ==
In 2023, a track at John Kincaide Stadium was renamed the Sha'Carri Richardson Track.

November 10, 2023 was declared Sha'Carri Richardson Day in Dallas, Texas.

== Awards ==
- Night of Legends Award 2023: Jackie Joyner-Kersee Female Athlete of the Year

== See also ==
- 2019 in 100 metres
- 2020 in 100 metres
- 2021 in 100 metres
- 2022 in 100 metres
