= Mujinga Kambundji =

Swiss sprinter (born 1992)

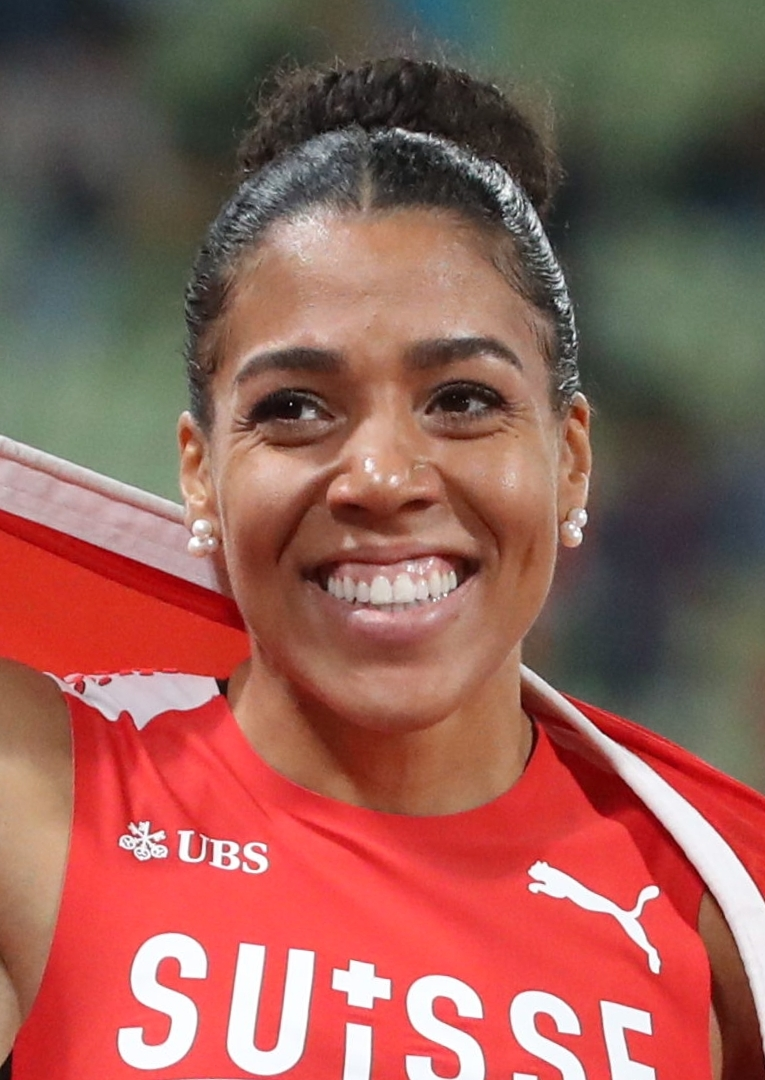
- Kambundji in 2022

Personal information
- Born: 17 June 1992 (age 34) Bern, Switzerland
- Height: 1.68 m (5 ft 6 in)
- Weight: 65 kg (143 lb)
- Life partner: Florian Clivaz

Sport
- Country: Switzerland
- Sport: Athletics
- Events: 60 m, 100 m, 200 m
- Club: ST Bern
- Coached by: Florian Clivaz (2022—); Adrian Rothenbühler (2017—2022); Valerij Bauer (2013–2017)

Achievements and titles
- Personal bests: 100 m: 10.89 NR (Zürich, 2022); 200 m: 22.05 NR (Eugene, 2022); Indoors; 60 m: 6.96 NR (Belgrade, 2022)
Medal record
Women's athletics
Representing Switzerland
World Championships
Bronze medal – third place	2019 Doha	200 m
World Indoor Championships
Gold medal – first place	2022 Belgrade	60 m
Gold medal – first place	2025 Nanjing	60 m
Bronze medal – third place	2018 Birmingham	60 m
European Championships
Gold medal – first place	2022 Munich	200 m
Gold medal – first place	2024 Rome	200 m
Silver medal – second place	2022 Munich	100 m
Bronze medal – third place	2016 Amsterdam	100 m
European Indoor Championships
Gold medal – first place	2023 Istanbul	60 m
Silver medal – second place	2025 Apeldoorn	60 m
Bronze medal – third place	2017 Belgrade	60 m
European Team Championships
Gold medal – first place	2017 Bydgoszcz	100 m
Gold medal – first place	2017 Bydgoszcz	4 × 100 m relay
Gold medal – first place	2019 Vaasa	200 m
Silver medal – second place	2019 Vaasa	4 × 100 m relay
European Youth Olympic Festival
Gold medal – first place	2009 Tampere	4 × 100 m relay
Silver medal – second place	2009 Tampere	100 m

Mujinga Kambundji (German pronunciation: [muˈʒɪŋa kamˈbʊndʒi]; born 17 June 1992) is a Swiss sprinter. She is the 2022 and 2025 World Indoor 60 m champion and she won the bronze medal in the 200 metres at the 2019 World Championships.

Kambundji earnt her first global medal, a bronze, over 60 m at the 2018 World Indoor Championships. She is a four-time European Championship medallist, winning gold in the 200 m in 2022 and 2024, as well as winning silver in the 100 m in 2022, and bronze in 2016. At the European Indoor Championships, she earned gold in the 60 m in 2023, silver in 2025 and bronze in 2017.

Kambundji's 60 m personal best of 6.96 s makes her the Swiss record holder and the sixth fastest woman ever in the event. She also holds the Swiss national records for the 100 m (10.90) and 200 m (22.05). She has represented Switzerland at the 2012, 2016, 2020 and 2024 Olympics, with her best finish being sixth in the 100 m in 2020 and 2024. She has won 31 Swiss national titles, both indoors and out.

== Early life and family ==
Mujinga Kambundji was born on 17 June 1992 in Bern to a Congolese father, Safuka, and a Bernese mother, Ruth. Mujinga is the second of four children. Her younger sister Ditaji is also an international athlete, who won gold in the 100 m hurdles at the 2025 World Athletics Championships. Her older sister, Kaluanda, was the first to enroll in a track programme, followed by Mujinga, then Muswama, and finally Ditaji. Muswama later competed in Bobsleigh.

== Career ==
=== 2009—2012: Early career and Olympic debut ===
In 2009, Kambundji won the silver medal in the 100 metres and the gold medal in the 4 × 100 m relay at the European Youth Olympic Festival, and gold medals in the 100 and 200 metres at the Swiss championships. For this, she was elected Swiss Athlete of the Year by the Swiss Athletics Association.

In 2010, she won the 200 m in the Second League of the European Team Championships, and broke the Swiss U20 record in the event by running 23.63 s at the World U20 Championships.

She represented Switzerland at the 2012 European Championships, where she was eliminated in the heats of the 100 m. Later that year, she competed in the heats of the 4×100 m relay at the 2012 Summer Olympics in London.

=== 2013—2014: Swiss 100 m national records ===
Kambundji trained with the ST Bern athletics club and was coached by Jacques Cordey. In the autumn of 2013 she moved to Mannheim to train under coach Valerij Bauer alongside former European champion Verena Sailer.

At the 2014 European Athletics Championships in Zürich, she broke her own national record in the heats and semi-finals of the 100 metres competition before finishing fourth in the final. She subsequently finished fifth and broke Regula Aebi's 26-year-old national record in the 200 metres final.

=== 2016—2017: European 100 m bronze medallist ===
Kambundji qualified for the Swiss team at the 2016 Summer Olympics in Rio de Janeiro, reaching the semi-finals of both the 100 m and the 200 m events. Earlier in the same year, she had won bronze in the 100 m competition at the European Championships in Amsterdam.

At the 2017 World Championships in London, Kambundji finished 10th in the 100 m competition. In the 4 × 100 m relay event, she and her teammates Ajla Del Ponte, Sarah Atcho and Salomé Kora improved the national record in the semi-finals and finished fifth in the final. At the end of the year, Kambundji announced that she will work with Dutch coach Henk Kraaijenhof in the future. Their working relationship was terminated after only two months, however. She switched coaches again to Adrian Rothenbühler who trained her for five years until November 2022 when her partner Florian Clivaz, a former sprinter, replaced Rothenbühler as Kambundji's coach.

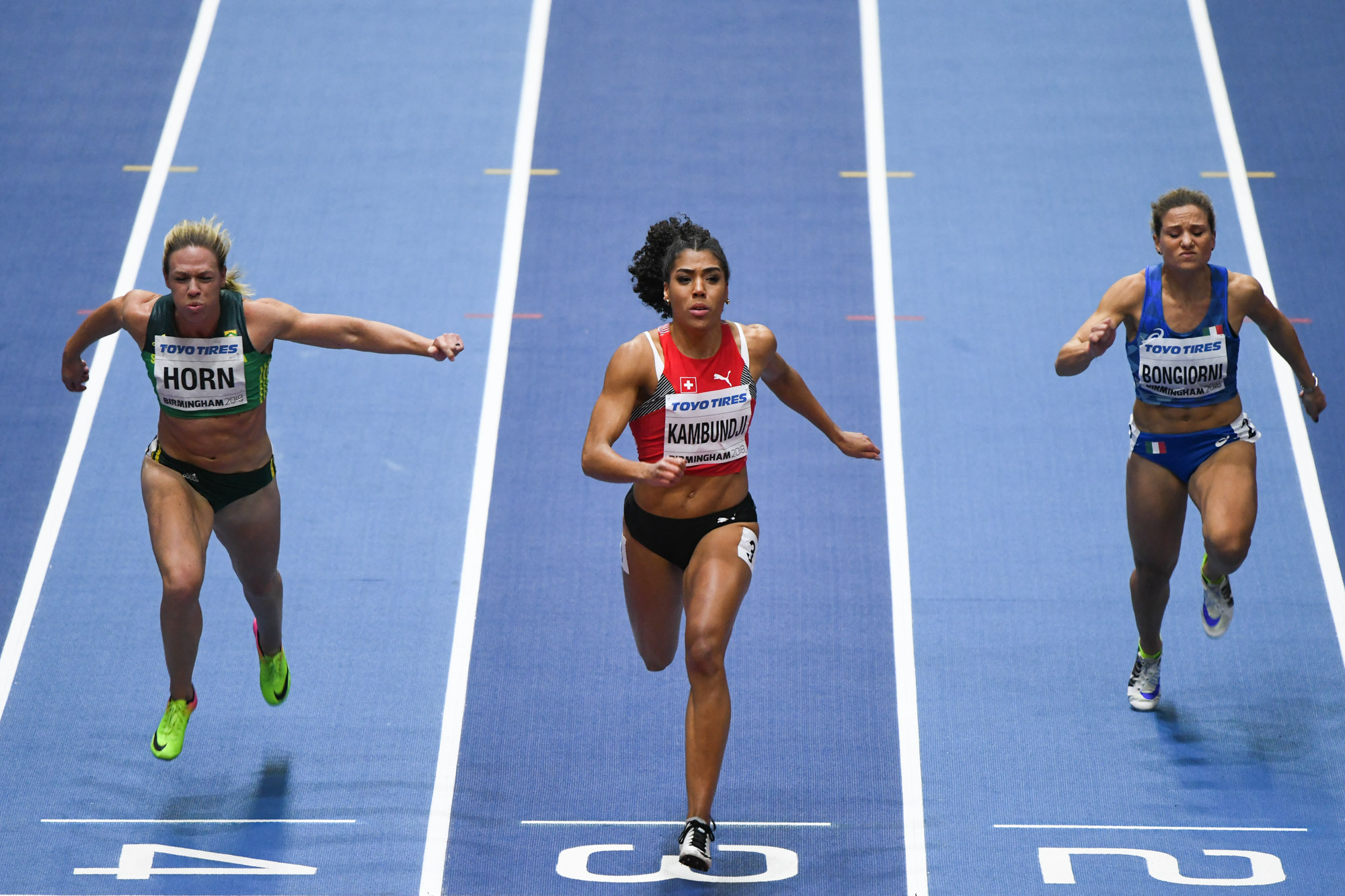
Kambundji races at the 2018 World Indoor Championships in Birmingham where she won the bronze medal.

=== 2018—2019: World 200 m bronze medallist ===
At the 2018 World Indoor Championships in Birmingham, Kambundji won bronze in the 60 m final. On 13 July, at the 2018 Swiss Championships in Zofingen, Kambundji won the 100 m in 10.95 s, becoming the first Swiss woman to break 11 seconds in the 100 m. At the European Championships in Berlin, she finished fourth in the 100 m and in the 200 m. She later competed in the 4 × 100 m relay (with Ajla Del Ponte, Sarah Atcho and Salomé Kora), where they also finished fourth.

On 23 August 2019, Kambundji won the Swiss 100 m title, running 11.00 s. The next day, she won the 200 m in a new national record of 22.26 s. At the World Championships held in Doha, Qatar, Kambundji finished won the bronze medal in the 200 m, becoming the first Swiss person to win a medal in a sprint event. Later, she was named the Swiss Female Sports Personality of the Year.

=== 2021—2022 ===
At the delayed 2020 Tokyo Olympics, Kambundji qualified for the finals in both 100 m and 200 m sprints, finishing sixth in the former and seventh in the latter event. She was also part of the Swiss 4 × 100 m relay team that finished fourth in the final. She won her first ever Diamond League in what was regarded as an upset win at the Prefontaine Classic on 21 August 2021, beating a field that included Gabby Thomas, Dina Asher-Smith and Allyson Felix over 200 m by running a wind-assisted time of 22.06 (+2.4).

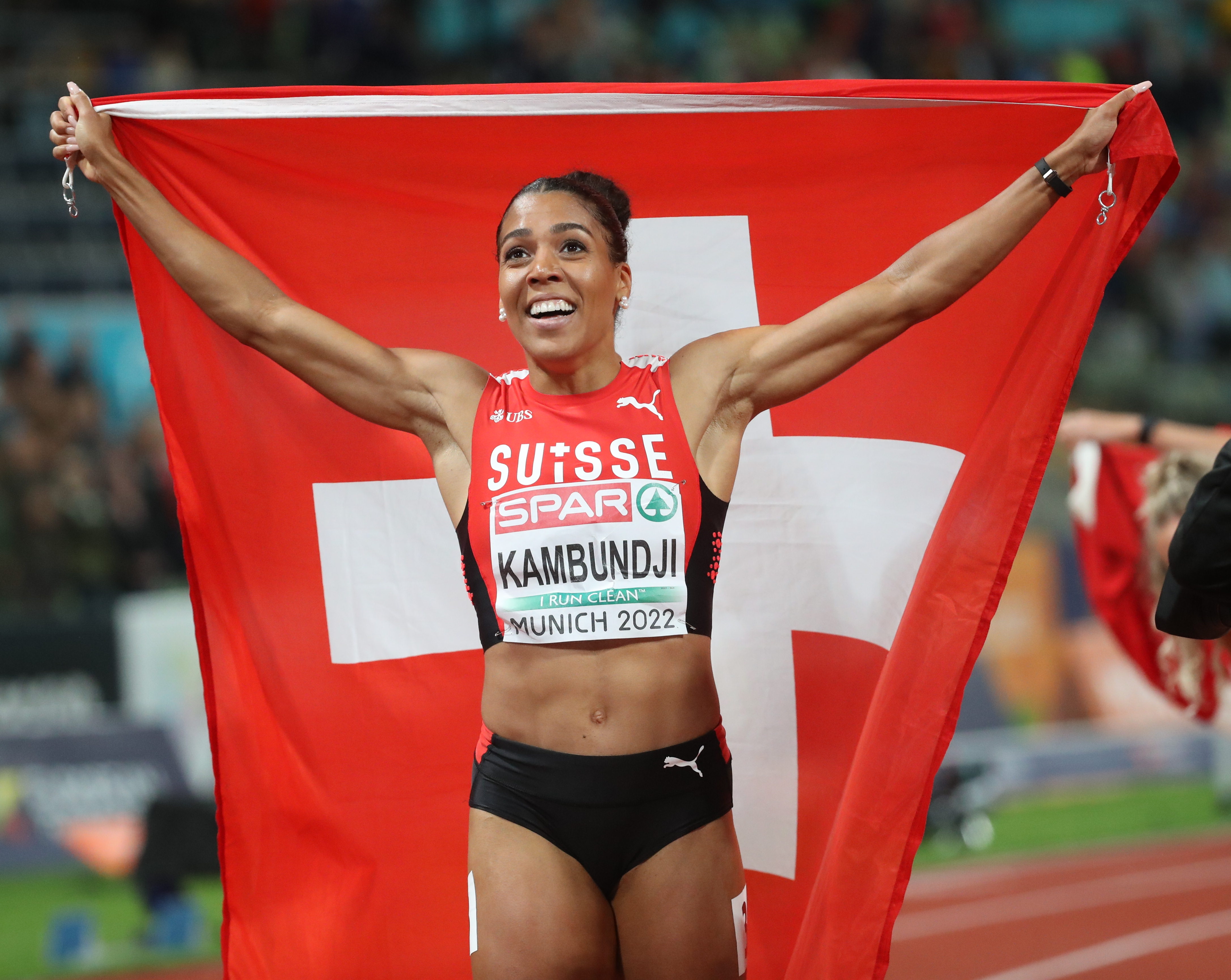
Kambundji after winning the 200 m at the 2022 European Championships.

She won the gold medal in the 60 m at the 2022 World Indoor Championships held in Belgrade in a time of 6.96 seconds, putting her joint-fourth on the world all-time list; a rare feat racing from lane eight. No woman had run faster over the distance since 1999. On 14 June, she won the 200 m at the Citius Meeting in Bern, running a Swiss national record and meeting record of 22.18 s. She also won the 100 m in 11.11 s. At the Swiss Championships on 24 June, Kambundji won the 100 m in 10.89 s, beating her own Swiss national record.

At the 2022 World Championships, she placed fifth in the 100 m, running 10.91 s. She went onto place eighth in the 200 m, running 22.55 s. She had previously improved her Swiss national record to 22.05 s in the semi-finals. At the European Championships in Munich, she won a silver medal behind Gina Luckenkemper in a photo finish in the 100 m, with both athletes being given a time of 10.99 s. Three days later, she won the 200 m title in a time of 22.32 s. She received another award for being the Swiss Female Sports Personality of the Year in December.

=== 2023-present: World and European 60 m champion ===
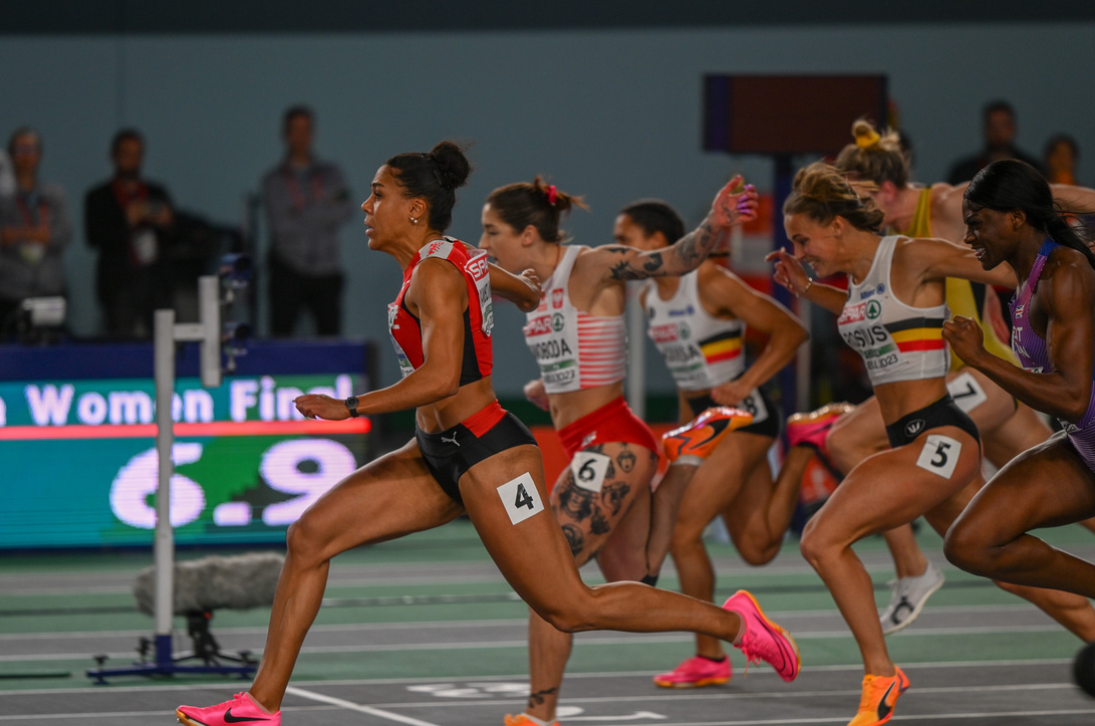
Kambundji winning the 60 m final at the 2023 European Indoor Championships.

At the 2023 European Indoor Championships in Istanbul, Kambundji won gold in the 60 m, running 7.00 s to win her first European Indoor title. In August, at the 2023 World Championships in Budapest, she was eliminated in the semi-finals of the 100 m.

The following year at the European Athletics Championships, she finished eighth in the 100 m, running 11.15 s. Two days later, Kambundji returned to win the 200 m final in 22.49 s, beating Daryll Neita by 0.01 s in a photo finish. On 14 July, she won at the Resisprint International in La Chaux-de-Fonds, running 10.90 s, only 0.01 s behind her personal best. At the Olympics in Paris, Kambundji finished sixth in the 100 m, running 10.99 s. She made the semi-finals of the 200 m, where she finished fourth and was eliminated.

In March 2025, Kambundji won silver over 60 m at the 2025 European Indoor Championships, running 7.02 s to finish 0.01 s behind Zaynab Dosso. Later that month, at the World Indoor Championships in Nanjing, she won gold in the same event, running 7.04 s.

== Personal life and miscellaneous ==
Kambundji gave birth to her first child in November 2025.

ETH Zurich student organization Swissloop's entry to the 2018 edition of the Hyperloop competition was a transport capsule named Mujinga, after Kambundji.

== Achievements ==
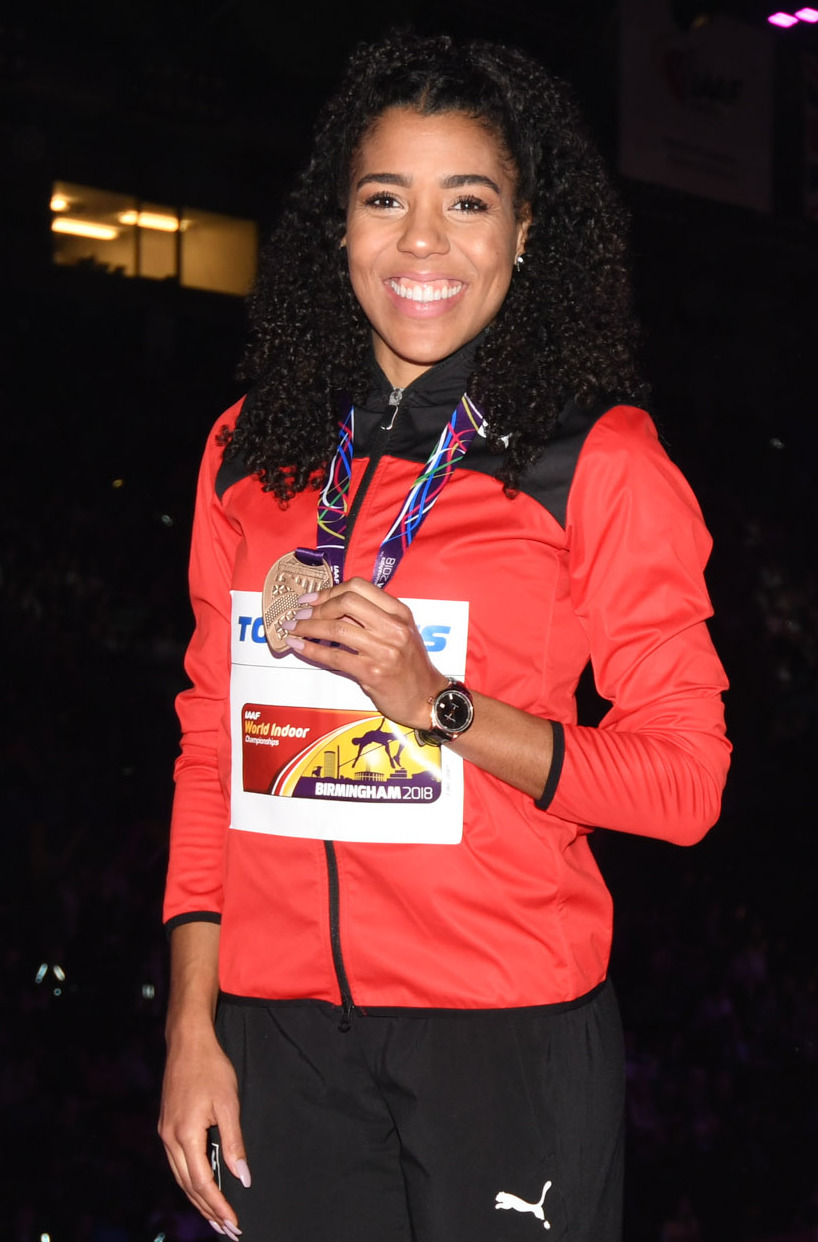
Mujinga Kambundji with her bronze at the 2018 World Indoor Championships held in Birmingham.

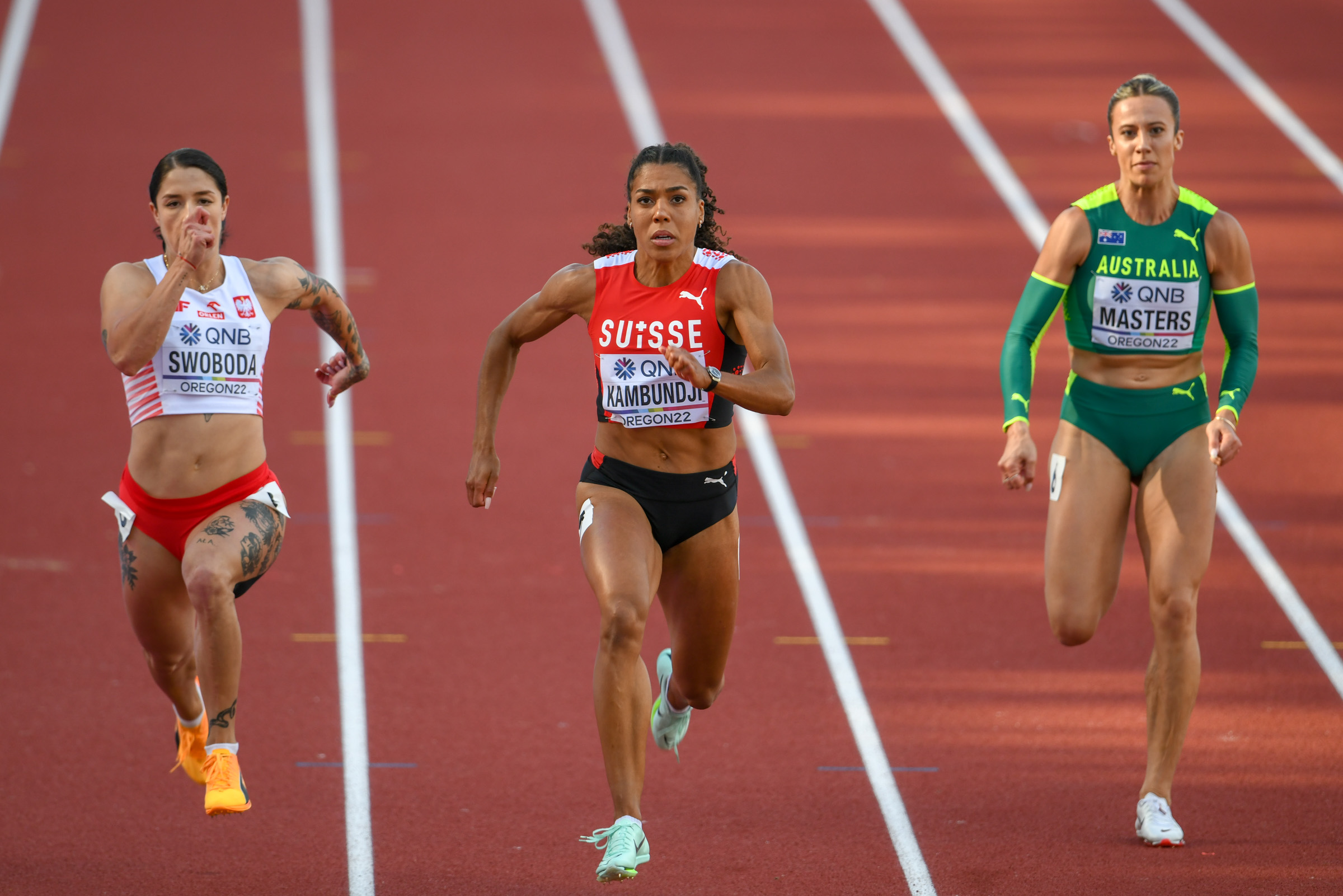
Kambundji (C) won her 100 m heat and later placed fifth in the final at the 2022 World Championships in Eugene.

=== Personal bests ===
Event	Time (m:)s	Wind (m/s)	Venue	Date	Notes
60 metres indoor	6.96	—N/a	Belgrade, Serbia	18 March 2022	NR
100 metres	10.89	+0.6	Zurich, Switzerland	24 June 2022	NR
200 metres	22.05	+2.0	Eugene, OR, United States	19 July 2022	NR
4 × 100 m relay	42.05	—N/a	Tokyo, Japan	5 August 2021	NR
4 × 200 m relay	1:31.75	—N/a	Nassau, Bahamas	25 May 2014	NR

=== International competitions ===
Representing Switzerland
Year	Competition	Venue	Position	Event	Time
2009	World Youth Championships	Brixen, Italy	6th	200 m	23.92
2009	European Youth Olympic Festival	Tampere, Finland	2nd	100 m	11.84
2009	European Youth Olympic Festival	Tampere, Finland	1st	4 × 100 m relay	46.30
2010	European Team Championships	Belgrade, Serbia	1st	200 m	24.20
2010	European Team Championships	Belgrade, Serbia	2nd	4 × 100 m relay	45.46
2011	European Team Championships	İzmir, Turkey	3rd	4 × 100 m relay	44.24
2011	European Athletics Junior Championships	Tallinn, Estonia	5th	100 m	11.53
2011	European Athletics Junior Championships	Tallinn, Estonia	5th	200 m	23.70
2013	European U23 Championships	Tampere, Finland	4th	100 m	11.55 SB
2013	European U23 Championships	Tampere, Finland	5th	200 m	23.70 SB
2014	European Championships	Zurich, Switzerland	4th	100 m	11.30
2014	European Championships	Zurich, Switzerland	5th	200 m	22.83 NR
2014	European Championships	Zurich, Switzerland	4th (h)	4 × 100 m relay	42.98^{1}
2015	European Indoor Championships	Prague, Czech Republic	5th	60 m	7.11 NR
2016	European Championships	Amsterdam, Netherlands	3rd	100 m	11.25
2017	European Indoor Championships	Belgrade, Serbia	3rd	60 m	7.16 SB
2017	European Team Championships First League	Vaasa, Finland	1st	100 m	11.45
2017	European Team Championships First League	Vaasa, Finland	1st	4 × 100 m relay	43.77
2017	World Championships	London, United Kingdom	5th	4 × 100 m relay	42.51
2018	World Indoor Championships	Birmingham, United Kingdom	3rd	60 m	7.05
2018	European Championships	Berlin, Germany	4th	100 m	11.05
2018	European Championships	Berlin, Germany	4th	200 m	22.45 SB
2018	European Championships	Berlin, Germany	4th	4 × 100 m relay	42.30
2019	European Indoor Championships	Glasgow, United Kingdom	5th	60 m	7.16
2019	European Team Championships Super League	Bydgoszcz, Poland	1st	200 m	22.72 SB
2019	European Team Championships Super League	Bydgoszcz, Poland	2nd	4 × 100 m relay	43.11
2019	World Championships	Doha, Qatar	3rd	200 m	22.51
2019	World Championships	Doha, Qatar	4th	4 × 100 m relay	42.18 NR
2021	Olympic Games	Tokyo, Japan	6th	100 m	10.99
2021	Olympic Games	Tokyo, Japan	7th	200 m	22.30
2021	Olympic Games	Tokyo, Japan	4th	4 × 100 m relay	42.08
2022	World Indoor Championships	Belgrade, Serbia	1st	60 m	6.96 WL
2022	World Championships	Eugene, United States	5th	100 m	10.91
2022	World Championships	Eugene, United States	8th	200 m	22.55
2022	World Championships	Eugene, United States	7th	4 × 100 m relay	42.81
2022	European Championships	Munich, Germany	2nd	100 m	10.99
2022	European Championships	Munich, Germany	1st	200 m	22.32
2023	European Indoor Championships	Istanbul, Turkey	1st	60 m	7.00 CR
2023	World Championships	Budapest, Hungary	13th (sf)	100 m	11.04 SB
2024	European Championships	Rome, Italy	8th	100 m	11.15
2024	European Championships	Rome, Italy	1st	200 m	22.49
2024	Olympic Games	Paris, France	6th	100 m	10.99
2024	Olympic Games	Paris, France	11th (sf)	200 m	22.63
2024	Olympic Games	Paris, France	6th (h)	4 × 100 m relay	42.36^{1}
2025	European Indoor Championships	Apeldoorn, Netherlands	2nd	60 m	7.02
2025	World Indoor Championships	Nanjing, China	1st	60 m	7.04
2026	European Championships	Birmingham, United Kingdom	23rd (sf)	200 m	23.81

^{1}Did not finish in the final.

=== Circuit wins and titles ===
- Diamond League

(4 × 100 metres relay wins, other events specified in parentheses)

- 2013: Lausanne Athletissima
- 2015: Lausanne Athletissima
- 2017: Lausanne Athletissima
- 2018: Lausanne Athletissima
- 2021: Eugene Prefontaine Classic (200 m)
- 2022 (2): Stockholm Bauhaus-Galan (MR), Lausanne Athletissima

- World Athletics Continental Tour

(200 metres wins, other nspecified in parentheses)

- 2021: Bellinzona Galà dei Castelli

- World Athletics Indoor Tour

(60 metres wins, other events specified in parentheses)

- 2023: Toruń Copernicus Cup

=== National titles ===
- Swiss Athletics Championships (19)
  - 100 metres: 2009, 2011, 2012, 2013, 2014, 2015, 2016, 2017, 2019, 2021, 2022, 2023, 2024
  - 200 metres: 2009, 2012, 2013, 2014, 2015, 2017, 2019, 2024
- Swiss Indoor Athletics Championships (9)
  - 60 metres indoor: 2014, 2015, 2016, 2017, 2018, 2019, 2022, 2023, 2025
  - 200 metres indoor: 2011

=== Recognition ===
2019

- Swiss Sports Personality of the Year

2022

- Swiss Sports Personality of the Year

== See also ==
- List of Swiss records in athletics
- Switzerland at the Olympics
- List of World Athletics Championships medalists (women)
- 100 metres at the World Athletics Championships
- 2019 in 100 metres
- 2020 in 100 metres
- 2021 in 100 metres
- 2022 in 100 metres

Awards and achievements
Preceded by Daniela Ryf	Swiss Sportswoman of the Year; 2019	Succeeded by Incumbent
Preceded by Belinda Bencic	Swiss Sportswoman of the Year; 2022	Succeeded by Incumbent
Olympic Games
Preceded by Giulia Steingruber	Flagbearer for Switzerland (with Max Heinzer); Tokyo 2020	Succeeded by Incumbent
