= 2021 in 100 metres =

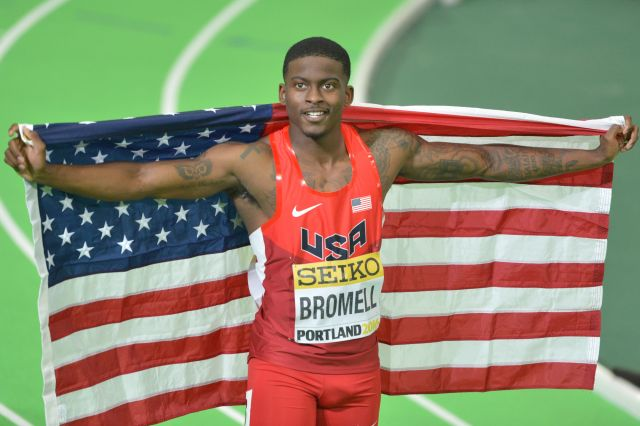
American Trayvon Bromell, World Leader (WL) in 100 metres 2021 men's outdoor season.

2021 in 100 metres lists the World Best Year Performance in the year 2021 in both the men's and the women's 100 metres.

== Records ==
Standing records prior to the 2020 season
Men's World record	Usain Bolt (JAM)	9.58	Berlin, Germany	16 August 2009
Women's World record	Florence Griffith Joyner (USA)	10.49	Indianapolis, United States	16 July 1988

== Men top 60 ==
#	Time	Wind	Athlete	Country	Venue	Date
1	9.76	+1.2	Trayvon Bromell	United States	Moi International Sports Centre, Kasarani, Nairobi (KEN)	18 September 2021
2	9.77	+1.2	Ferdinand Omanyala	Kenya	Moi International Sports Centre, Kasarani, Nairobi (KEN)	18 September 2021
3	9.80	+0.1	Marcell Jacobs	Italy	National Stadium, Tokyo (JPN)	1 August 2021
4	9.83	+0.9	Su Bingtian	China	National Stadium, Tokyo (JPN)	1 August 2021
4	9.83	+0.9	Ronnie Baker	United States	National Stadium, Tokyo (JPN)	1 August 2021
6	9.84	+1.2	Akani Simbine	South Africa	Bregyó Athletic Center, Székesfehérvár (HUN)	6 July 2021
6	9.84	+0.1	Fred Kerley	United States	National Stadium, Tokyo (JPN)	1 August 2021
8	9.85	+1.5	Marvin Bracy	United States	Ansin Sports Complex, Miramar, FL (USA)	5 June 2021
9	9.89	+0.2	Isiah Young	United States	National Training Center, Clermont, FL (USA)	30 May 2021
9	9.89	+0.8	Kenneth Bednarek	United States	Hayward Field, Eugene, OR (USA)	20 June 2021
9	9.89	+0.1	Andre De Grasse	Canada	National Stadium, Tokyo (JPN)	1 August 2021
12	9.91	+0.8	Micah Williams	United States	Hayward Field, Eugene, OR (USA)	20 June 2021
13	9.94	+1.6	Jo'Vaughn Martin	United States	Percy Beard Track, Gainesville, FL (USA)	17 April 2021
13	9.94	+1.3	Gift Leotlela	South Africa	UJ Stadium, Johannesburg (RSA)	14 May 2021
15	9.95	+2.0	Ryota Yamagata	Japan	Athletic Stadium, Tottori (JPN)	6 June 2021
15	9.95	+1.9	Noah Lyles	United States	Hayward Field, Eugene, OR (USA)	19 June 2021
15	9.95	+0.1	Yohan Blake	Jamaica	Marietta HS, Marietta, GA (USA)	9 July 2021
18	9.96	+1.9	Cravon Gillespie	United States	Hilmer Lodge Stadium, Walnut, CA (USA)	9 May 2021
19	9.97	+1.5	Benjamin Azamati	Ghana	Mike A. Myers Stadium, Austin, TX (USA)	26 March 2021
19	9.97	+1.9	Kyree King	United States	Ansin Sports Complex, Miramar, FL (USA)	10 April 2021
19	9.97	-0.5	Michael Norman	United States	Stadio Colbachini, Padova (ITA)	5 September 2021
22	9.98	+1.9	Justin Gatlin	United States	Ansin Sports Complex, Miramar, FL (USA)	10 April 2021
22	9.98	+0.3	Enoch Adegoke	Nigeria	National Stadium, Tokyo (JPN)	31 July 2021
22	9.98	-0.2	Zharnel Hughes	United Kingdom	National Stadium, Tokyo (JPN)	1 August 2021
25	10.00	+1.9	Cejhae Greene	Antigua and Barbuda	Ansin Sports Complex, Miramar, FL (USA)	10 April 2021
25	10.00	+0.9	Femi Ogunode	Qatar	Suhaim bin Hamad Stadium, Doha (QAT)	28 May 2021
25	10.00	+0.6	Tyquendo Tracey	Jamaica	National Stadium, Kingston (JAM)	25 June 2021
25	10.00	+1.2	Michael Rodgers	United States	Bregyó Athletic Center, Székesfehérvár (HUN)	6 July 2021
29	10.01	+1.9	Emmanuel Matadi	Liberia	Ansin Sports Complex, Miramar, FL (USA)	10 April 2021
29	10.01	+2.0	Jason Rogers	Saint Kitts and Nevis	Tropical Park Track, Miami, FL (USA)	24 April 2021
29	10.01	+1.9	Christopher Belcher	United States	Hilmer Lodge Stadium, Walnut, CA (USA)	9 May 2021
29	10.01	+2.0	Shuhei Tada	Japan	Athletic Stadium, Tottori (JPN)	6 June 2021
29	10.01	+0.8	Rohan Browning	Australia	National Stadium, Tokyo (JPN)	31 July 2021
29	10.01	+2.0	Erik Cardoso	Brazil	Bragança Paulista (BRA)	4 September 2021
35	10.03	+1.9	Chijindu Ujah	United Kingdom	Hilmer Lodge Stadium, Walnut, CA (USA)	9 May 2021
35	10.03	+0.8	Julian Forte	Jamaica	National Stadium, Kingston (JAM)	25 June 2021
37	10.04	+2.0	Nigel Ellis	Jamaica	Tropical Park Track, Miami, FL (USA)	24 April 2023
37	10.04	0.0	Shaun Maswanganyi	South Africa	Cushing Stadium, College Station, TX (USA)	29 May 2021
37	10.04	+0.6	Oblique Seville	Jamaica	National Stadium, Kingston (JAM)	25 June 2021
37	10.04	0.0	Elijah Hall	United States	Lantos Mihály Sportközpont, Budapest (HUN)	24 August 2021
37	10.04	+1.2	Mouhamadou Fall	France	Moi International Sports Centre, Kasarani, Nairobi (KEN)	18 September 2021
42	10.05	+1.5	Divine Oduduru	Nigeria	Jax Track at Hodges Stadium, Jacksonville, FL (USA)	30 April 2021
42	10.05	+1.4	Davonte Burnett	United States	Katherine B. Loker Stadium, Los Angeles, CA (USA)	16 May 2021
42	10.05	+0.4	Terrance Laird	United States	Hayward Field, Eugene, OR (USA)	11 June 2021
42	10.05	+1.5	Mark Odhiambo	Kenya	Moi International Sports Centre, Kasarani, Nairobi (KEN)	17 June 2021
46	10.06	+1.6	Joseph Amoah	Ghana	Jax Track at Hodges Stadium, Jacksonville, FL (USA)	28 May 2021
46	10.06	+0.1	Chen Guanfeng	China	Chongqing (CHN)	24 June 2021
46	10.06	-0.4	Jerome Blake	Canada	Christian Brothers HS, Memphis, TN (USA)	15 August 2021
46	10.06	-1.2	Jimmy Vicaut	France	Stade Jules Ladoumegue, La Roche-sur-Yon (FRA)	3 September 2021
50	10.07	+2.0	Paulo André de Oliveira	Brazil	Cougar Athletic Stadium, Azusa, CA (USA)	10 April 2021
50	10.07	+1.2	Usheoritse Itsekiri	Nigeria	Yabatech Sport Complex, Lagos (NGR)	17 June 2021
52	10.08	+1.9	Aaron Brown	Canada	Ansin Sports Complex, Miramar, FL (USA)	10 April 2021
52	10.08	+1.6	Javonte' Harding	United States	Jax Track at Hodges Stadium, Jacksonville, FL (USA)	28 May 2021
52	10.08	+1.6	Lance Lang	United States	Jax Track at Hodges Stadium, Jacksonville, FL (USA)	28 May 2021
52	10.08	+1.5	Chris Royster	United States	Ansin Sports Complex, Miramar, FL (USA)	5 June 2021
56	10.09	+0.8	Ameer Webb	United States	Cougar Athletic Stadium, Azusa, CA (USA)	16 April 2021
56	10.09	+1.6	Nolton Shelvin	United States	Texan Track & Field Complex, Levelland, TX (USA)	13 May 2021
56	10.09	+1.6	Ismael Kone	Ivory Coast	Jax Track at Hodges Stadium, Jacksonville, FL (USA)	28 May 2021
56	10.09	+0.2	Jaylen Slade	United States	National Training Center, Clermont, FL (USA)	30 May 2021
56	10.09	+0.8	Alonso Edward	Panama	Stadion Juliska, Praha (CZE)	7 June 2021

== Women top 60 ==
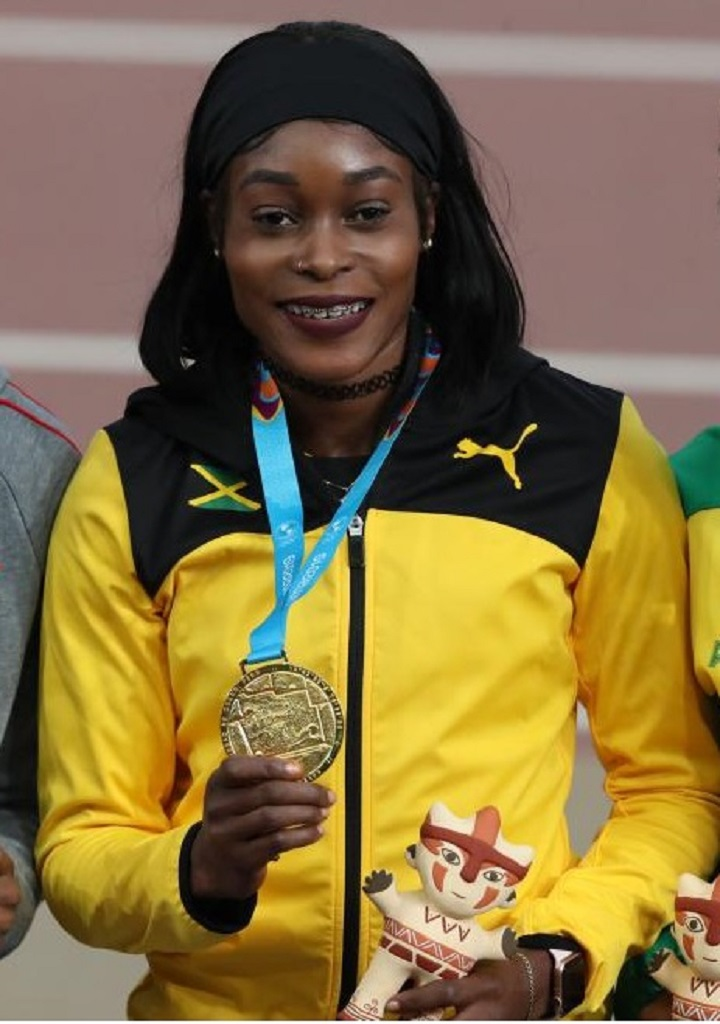
Jamaican Elaine Thompson-Herah, World Leader (WL) in 100 metres 2021 women's outdoor season.

#	Time	Wind	Athlete	Country	Venue	Date
1	10.54	+0.9	Elaine Thompson-Herah	Jamaica	Hayward Field, Eugene, OR (USA)	21 August 2021
2	10.60	+1.7	Shelly-Ann Fraser-Pryce	Jamaica	Stade Olympique de la Pontaise, Lausanne (SUI)	26 August 2021
3	10.72	+1.6	Sha'Carri Richardson	United States	Ansin Sports Complex, Miramar, FL (USA)	10 April 2021
4	10.76	-0.6	Shericka Jackson	Jamaica	National Stadium, Tokyo (JPN)	31 July 2021
5	10.78	-0.3	Marie-Josée Ta Lou	Ivory Coast	National Stadium, Tokyo (JPN)	30 July 2021
6	10.83	+0.9	Teahna Daniels	United States	Hayward Field, Eugene, OR (USA)	21 August 2021
7	10.87	+1.3	Natasha Morrison	Jamaica	Tropical Park Track, Miami, FL (USA)	24 April 2021
7	10.87	+0.6	Dina Asher-Smith	United Kingdom	Letzigrund, Zürich (SUI)	9 September 2021
9	10.89	+1.3	Twanisha Terry	United States	Cushing Stadium, College Station, TX (USA)	29 May 2021
10	10.90	+1.1	Blessing Okagbare	Nigeria	Suhaim bin Hamad Stadium, Doha (QAT)	28 May 2021
10	10.90	+1.8	Ajla Del Ponte	Switzerland	Stade de La Charrière, La Chaux-de-Fonds (SUI)	14 August 2021
12	10.91	+0.7	Aleia Hobbs	United States	LSU Bernie Moore Stadium, Baton Rouge, LA (USA)	24 April 2021
13	10.92	+1.4	Cambrea Sturgis	United States	Jax Track at Hodges Stadium, Jacksonville, FL (USA)	29 May 2021
14	10.93	+0.6	Daryll Neita	United Kingdom	Letzigrund, Zürich (SUI)	9 September 2021
15	10.94	+0.6	Mujinga Kambundji	Switzerland	Letzigrund, Zürich (SUI)	9 September 2021
16	10.96	+0.7	Tamara Clark	United States	LSU Bernie Moore Stadium, Baton Rouge, LA (USA)	24 April 2021
16	10.96	+1.2	Tianna Bartoletta	United States	Ansin Sports Complex, Miramar, FL (USA)	5 June 2021
16	10.96	+1.1	Javianne Oliver	United States	Hayward Field, Eugene, OR (USA)	18 June 2021
19	10.97	+1.2	Briana Williams	Jamaica	Ansin Sports Complex, Miramar, FL (USA)	5 June 2021
20	10.98	+0.1	Kemba Nelson	Jamaica	Cushing Stadium, College Station, TX (USA)	29 May 2021
21	10.99	+1.1	Kayla White	United States	Hayward Field, Eugene, OR (USA)	18 June 2021
22	11.00	+0.8	Gabrielle Thomas	United States	Hayward Field, Eugene, OR (USA)	18 June 2021
22	11.00	+1.3	Nzubechi Grace Nwokocha	Nigeria	National Stadium, Tokyo (JPN)	30 July 2021
22	11.00	-0.2	Michelle-Lee Ahye	Trinidad and Tobago	National Stadium, Tokyo (JPN)	31 July 2021
25	11.01	+1.8	Alexandra Burghardt	Germany	Stade Bouleyres, Bulle (SUI)	10 July 2021
26	11.02	+0.7	Mikiah Brisco	United States	LSU Bernie Moore Stadium, Baton Rouge, LA (USA)	24 April 2021
26	11.02	+0.7	Symone Mason	United States	LSU Bernie Moore Stadium, Baton Rouge, LA (USA)	24 April 2021
26	11.02	+1.3	Tynia Gaither	Bahamas	Tropical Park Track, Miami, FL (USA)	24 April 2021
29	11.07	+1.3	Natalliah Whyte	Jamaica	Ansin Sports Complex, Miramar, FL (USA)	10 April 2021
29	11.07	+1.9	Hannah Cunliffe	United States	Jax Track at Hodges Stadium, Jacksonville, FL (USA)	30 April 2021
29	11.07	+0.4	Kiara Parker	United States	Boston, MA (USA)	23 May 2021
32	11.08	+1.8	Morolake Akinosun	United States	Hilmer Lodge Stadium, Walnut, CA (USA)	9 May 2021
32	11.08	+1.6	Marybeth Sant-Price	United States	Grace Center for Athletics and Community Service, Colorado Springs, CO (USA)	13 June 2021
34	11.09	+1.3	Kourtnei Johnson	United States	Ansin Sports Complex, Miramar, FL (USA)	10 April 2021
34	11.09	+1.6	Ackera Nugent	Jamaica	Cushing Stadium, College Station, TX (USA)	27 May 2021
34	11.09	+0.8	Dezerea Bryant	United States	Hayward Field, Eugene, OR (USA)	18 June 2021
34	11.09	-0.6	Tina Clayton	Jamaica	Moi International Sports Centre, Kasarani, Nairobi (KEN)	19 August 2021
34	11.09	+0.9	English Gardner	United States	Lantos Mihály Sportközpont, Budapest (HUN)	24 August 2021
39	11.10	+1.8	Ashanti Moore	Jamaica	National Training Center, Clermont, FL (USA)	2 May 2021
39	11.10	+2.0	Tatjana Pinto	Germany	Stadion Manfort, Leverkusen (GER)	27 June 2021
39	11.10	+1.8	Lorène Bazolo	Portugal	Stade de La Charrière, La Chaux-de-Fonds (SUI)	14 August 2021
42	11.11	+1.6	Jada Baylark	United States	Cushing Stadium, College Station, TX (USA)	27 May 2021
42	11.11	-1.0	Jenna Prandini	United States	Hayward Field, Eugene, OR (USA)	19 June 2021
42	11.11	+0.7	Crystal Emmanuel	Canada	Complexe Sportif Claude-Robillard, Montréal (CAN)	29 June 2021
45	11.12	-0.5	Rhoda Njobvu	Zambia	National Heroes Stadium, Lusaka (ZAM)	20 March 2021
45	11.12	+1.8	Tiana Wilson	United States	Mike A. Myers Stadium, Austin, TX (USA)	27 March 2021
45	11.12	+1.9	Jayla Kirkland	United States	Jax Track at Hodges Stadium, Jacksonville, FL (USA)	30 March 2021
45	11.12	+1.7	Lisa Mayer	Germany	Michael-Hoffmann-Stadion, Mannheim (GER)	15 May 2021
45	11.12	0.0	Maia McCoy	United States	Jax Track at Hodges Stadium, Jacksonville, FL (USA)	29 May 2021
45	11.12	+1.2	Salomé Kora	Switzerland	Centre sportif Bout-du-Monde, Genève (SUI)	12 June 2021
45	11.12	+1.3	Gina Bass	United States	National Stadium, Tokyo (JPN)	30 July 2021
52	11.13	+0.5	Candace Hill	United States	Cougar Athletic Stadium, Azusa, CA (USA)	16 April 2021
52	11.13	+1.1	Shashalee Forbes	Jamaica	National Stadium, Kingston (JAM)	24 June 2021
54	11.14	+2.0	Tristan Evelyn	Barbados	USF Track Complex, Tampa, FL (USA)	16 May 2021
54	11.14	+1.1	Remona Burchell	Jamaica	National Stadium, Kingston (JAM)	24 June 2021
54	11.14	+0.8	Bassant Hemida	Egypt	Brno (CZE)	4 July 2021
57	11.15	0.0	Alfreda Steele	United States	Jax Track at Hodges Stadium, Jacksonville, FL (USA)	29 May 2021
57	11.15	+0.8	Dafne Schippers	Netherlands	FBK Stadium, Hengelo (NED)	6 June 2021
57	11.15	+0.7	Ge Manqi	China	Chongqing (CHN)	24 June 2021
57	11.15	+1.4	Imani Lansiquot	United Kingdom	Sportcentrum Wembley, Kortrijk (BEL)	10 July 2021

== See also ==
- 2020 in 100 metres
- 2022 in 100 metres
