= 2020 in 100 metres =

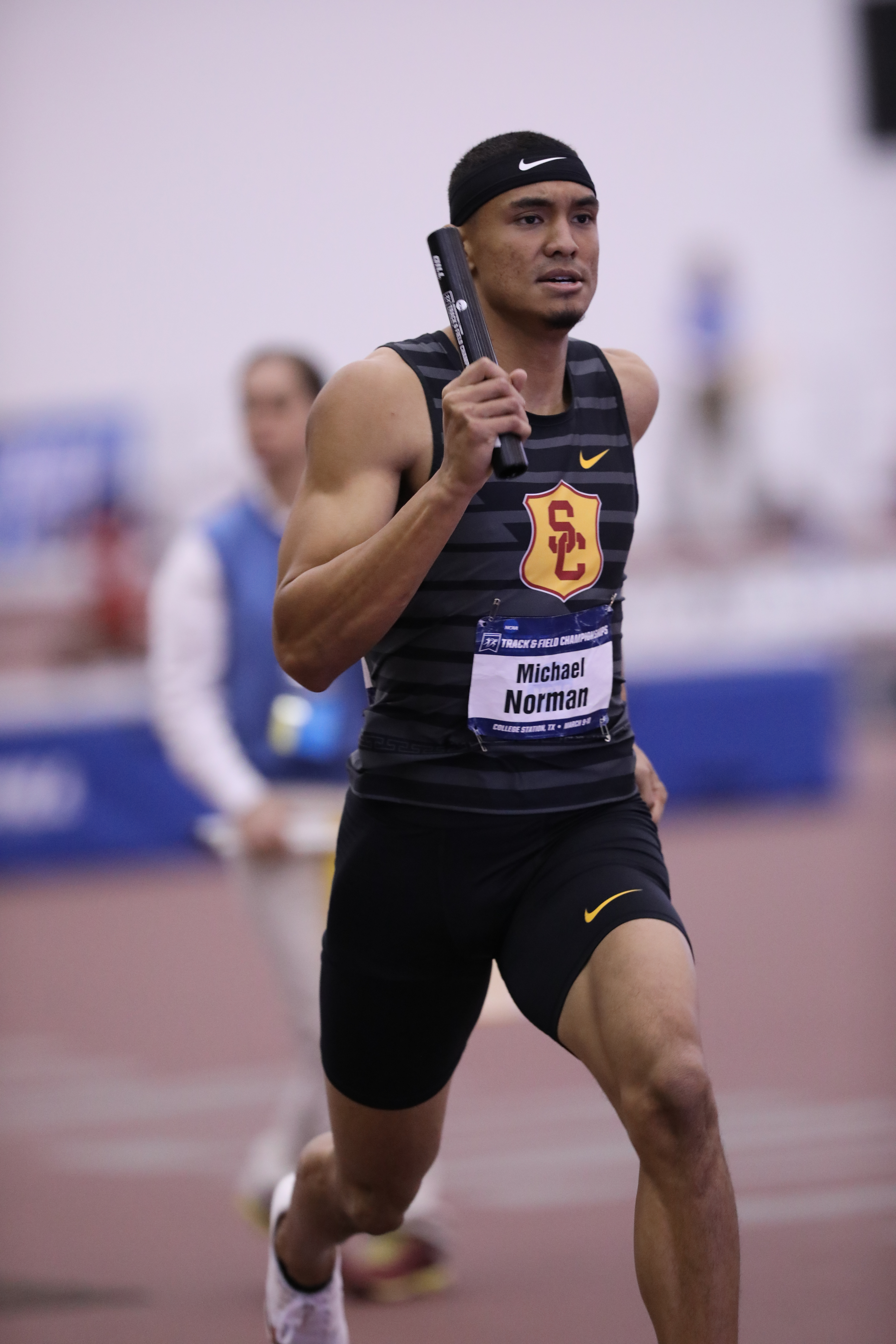
The American Michael Norman, World Leader (WL) in 100 metres 2020 men's outdoor season.

2020 in 100 metres lists the World Best Year Performance in the year 2020 in both the men's and the women's 100 metres.

== Records ==
Standing records prior to the 2020 season
| Men's World record | Usain Bolt (JAM) | 9.58 | Berlin, Germany | 16 August 2009 |
| Women's World record | Florence Griffith Joyner (USA) | 10.49 | Indianapolis, United States | 16 July 1988 |

== Men top 60 ==
| # | Time | Wind | Athlete | Country | Venue | Date |
|---|---|---|---|---|---|---|
| 1 | 9.86 | +1.6 | Michael Norman | United States | AP Ranch, Fort Worth, TX (USA) | 20 July 2020 |
| 2 | 9.90 | +1.4 | Trayvon Bromell | United States | National Training Center, Clermont, FL (USA) | 24 July 2020 |
| 3 | 9.91 | +1.7 | Akani Simbine | South Africa | Bestmed Tuks Stadium, Pretoria (RSA) | 14 March 2020 |
| 4 | 9.97 | +1.9 | André De Grasse | Canada | National Training Center, Clermont, FL (USA) | 24 July 2020 |
| 5 | 10.00 | +1.1 | Ronnie Baker | United States | AP Ranch, Fort Worth, TX (USA) | 23 July 2020 |
| 6 | 10.03 | +0.3 | Julian Forte | Jamaica | Jamaica College Ashenheim Stadium, Kingston (JAM) | 18 July 2020 |
| 6 | 10.03 | +1.6 | Rai Benjamin | United States | AP Ranch, Fort Worth, TX (USA) | 20 July 2020 |
| 6 | 10.03 | +1.0 | Aska Cambridge | Japan | Prefectural Stadium, Fukui (JPN) | 29 August 2020 |
| 9 | 10.04 | +1.4 | Noah Lyles | United States | National Training Center, Clermont, FL (USA) | 24 July 2020 |
| 9 | 10.04 | +1.4 | Yoshihide Kiryu | Japan | Hokuroku Park Athletic Field, Fujiyoshida (JPN) | 01 August 2020 |
| 9 | 10.04 | +0.2 | Andre Ewers | Jamaica | Bolles HS Track, Jacksonville, FL (USA) | 08 August 2020 |
| 9 | 10.04 | +1.8 | Kyree King | United States | Montverde Academy, Montverde, FL (USA) | 10 August 2020 |
| 9 | 10.04 | +0.3 | Arthur Cissé | Ivory Coast | Stadio Olimpico, Roma (ITA) | 17 September 2020 |
| 14 | 10.06 | +0.8 | Shaun Maswanganyi | South Africa | Bestmed Tuks Stadium, Pretoria (RSA) | 14 March 2020 |
| 15 | 10.07 | +1.1 | Justin Gatlin | United States | AP Ranch, Fort Worth, TX (USA) | 23 July 2020 |
| 15 | 10.07 | -0.2 | Filippo Tortu | Italy | Stadio Comunale, Bellinzona (SUI) | 15 September 2020 |
| 17 | 10.08 | +1.3 | Henricho Bruintjies | South Africa | Bestmed Tuks Stadium, Pretoria (RSA) | 14 March 2020 |
| 17 | 10.08 | +1.4 | Deniz Almas | Germany | Sepp-Herberger-Stadion, Weinheim (GER) | 01 August 2020 |
| 19 | 10.09 | +1.7 | Cravon Gillespie | United States | PVAMU Track Stadium, Prairie View, TX (USA) | 06 August 2020 |
| 19 | 10.09 | +1.8 | Kenneth Bednarek | United States | Montverde Academy, Montverde, FL (USA) | 10 August 2020 |
| 19 | 10.09 | +0.9 | Jeff Demps | United States | Drake Stadium, Des Moines, IA (USA) | 29 August 2020 |
| 22 | 10.10 | +1.8 | Divine Oduduru | Nigeria | National Training Center, Clermont, FL (USA) | 24 July 2020 |
| 22 | 10.10 | +1.6 | Lamont Marcell Jacobs | Italy | Stadio Giuseppe Grezar, Trieste (ITA) | 01 August 2020 |
| 24 | 10.11 | +2.0 | Silvan Wicki | Switzerland | Stade Bouleyres, Bulle (SUI) | 11 July 2020 |
| 24 | 10.11 | +1.9 | Senoj-Jay Givans | Jamaica | National Training Center, Clermont, FL (USA) | 24 July 2020 |
| 24 | 10.11 | +0.1 | Felipe Bardi | Brazil | COTP Stadium, São Paulo (BRA) | 11 DEC 2020 |
| 27 | 10.12 | +1.5 | Jack Hale | Australia | WA Sports Centre, Perth (AUS) | 01 February 2020 |
| 27 | 10.12 | +0.9 | Devin Quinn | United States | Drake Stadium, Des Moines, IA (USA) | 29 August 2020 |
| 27 | 10.12 | +0.3 | Michael Rodgers | United States | Stadio Olimpico, Roma (ITA) | 17 September 2020 |
| 27 | 10.12 | +1.4 | Paulo André Camilo De Oliveira | Brazil | COTP Stadium, São Paulo (BRA) | 11 DEC 2020 |
| 31 | 10.13 | +2.0 | Shota Iizuka | Japan | Kusanagi Athletic Stadium, Shizuoka (JPN) | 02 August 2020 |
| 31 | 10.13 | -0.5 | Chun-Han Yang | Chinese Taipei | New Taipei City (TPE) | 04 DEC 2020 |
| 33 | 10.14 | +1.8 | Kendal Williams | United States | National Training Center, Clermont, FL (USA) | 24 July 2020 |
| 33 | 10.14 | +1.6 | Joshua Hartmann | Germany | Sportanlage an der Kanalstraße, Zeven (GER) | 25 July 2020 |
| 33 | 10.14 | +1.8 | Soshi Mizukubo | Japan | Denka Big Swan Stadium, Niigata (JPN) | 12 September 2020 |
| 36 | 10.15 | +2.0 | Aaron Brown | Canada | Montverde Academy, Montverde, FL (USA) | 10 August 2020 |
| 36 | 10.15 | 0.0 | Yohan Blake | Jamaica | National Stadium, Kingston (JAM) | 22 August 2020 |
| 38 | 10.16 | +1.5 | Rohan Browning | Australia | WA Sports Centre, Perth (AUS) | 01 February 2020 |
| 38 | 10.16 | +1.8 | Nickel Ashmeade | Jamaica | National Training Center, Clermont, FL (USA) | 24 July 2020 |
| 38 | 10.16 | +0.4 | Yupun Abeykoon Mudiyanselage | Sri Lanka | Paul Greifzu Stadion, Dessau (GER) | 08 September 2020 |
| 38 | 10.16 | +0.7 | Mouhamadou Fall | France | Stadium Municipal, Albi (FRA) | 12 September 2020 |
| 42 | 10.17 | +1.7 | Simon Magakwe | South Africa | Bestmed Tuks Stadium, Pretoria (RSA) | 14 March 2020 |
| 42 | 10.17 | +1.3 | Chijindu Ujah | United Kingdom | Paavo Nurmi Stadium, Turku (FIN) | 11 August 2020 |
| 42 | 10.17 | +1.1 | Joris Van Gool | Netherlands | Atletiekbaan Maarschalkerweerd, Utrecht (NED) | 29 August 2020 |
| 45 | 10.18 | +1.5 | Jaylen Bacon | United States | National Training Center, Clermont, FL (USA) | 24 July 2020 |
| 45 | 10.18 | +0.5 | Yuhong He | China | Sichuan Xipu Training Base, Chengdu (CHN) | 24 July 2020 |
| 45 | 10.18 | +1.6 | Nesta Carter | Jamaica | Jamaica College Ashenheim Stadium, Kingston (JAM) | 25 July 2020 |
| 45 | 10.18 | +2.0 | Maurice Eaddy | United States | Montverde Academy, Montverde, FL (USA) | 10 August 2020 |
| 45 | 10.18 | +1.5 | Shuhei Tada | Japan | Prefectural Stadium, Fukui (JPN) | 29 August 2020 |
| 50 | 10.19 | +1.6 | Rodrigo do Nascimento | Brazil | Centro de Atletismo Professor Oswaldo Terra, Sao Bernardo do Campo (BRA) | 29 February 2020 |
| 50 | 10.19 | +1.6 | Przemysław Słowikowski | Poland | Stadion Miejski, Jelenia Góra (POL) | 26 July 2020 |
| 50 | 10.19 | +1.0 | Yuki Koike | Japan | Prefectural Stadium, Fukui (JPN) | 29 August 2020 |
| 50 | 10.19 | +0.7 | Amaury Golitin | France | Stadium Municipal, Albi (FRA) | 12 September 2020 |
| 54 | 10.20 | 0.0 | Isiah Young | United States | Montverde Academy, Montverde, FL (USA) | 04 July 2020 |
| 54 | 10.20 | +0.1 | Tyquendo Tracey | Jamaica | National Stadium, Kingston (JAM) | 08 August 2020 |
| 54 | 10.20 | +1.8 | Bruno Dede | Japan | Denka Big Swan Stadium, Niigata (JPN) | 12 September 2020 |
| 57 | 10.21 | +0.9 | Oshane Bailey | Jamaica | National Stadium, Kingston (JAM) | 29 February 2020 |
| 57 | 10.21 | +0.8 | Jan Veleba | Czech Republic | Stadion Juliska, Praha (CZE) | 08 June 2020 |
| 57 | 10.21 | +0.1 | Romario Williams | Jamaica | National Stadium, Kingston (JAM) | 08 August 2020 |
| 57 | 10.21 | +0.2 | Sean Safo-Antwi | Ghana | Stade de La Charrière, La Chaux-de-Fonds (SUI) | 15 August 2020 |
| 57 | 10.21 | +0.9 | Akihiro Higashida | Japan | Prefectural Stadium, Fukui (JPN) | 29 August 2020 |

== Women top 60 ==
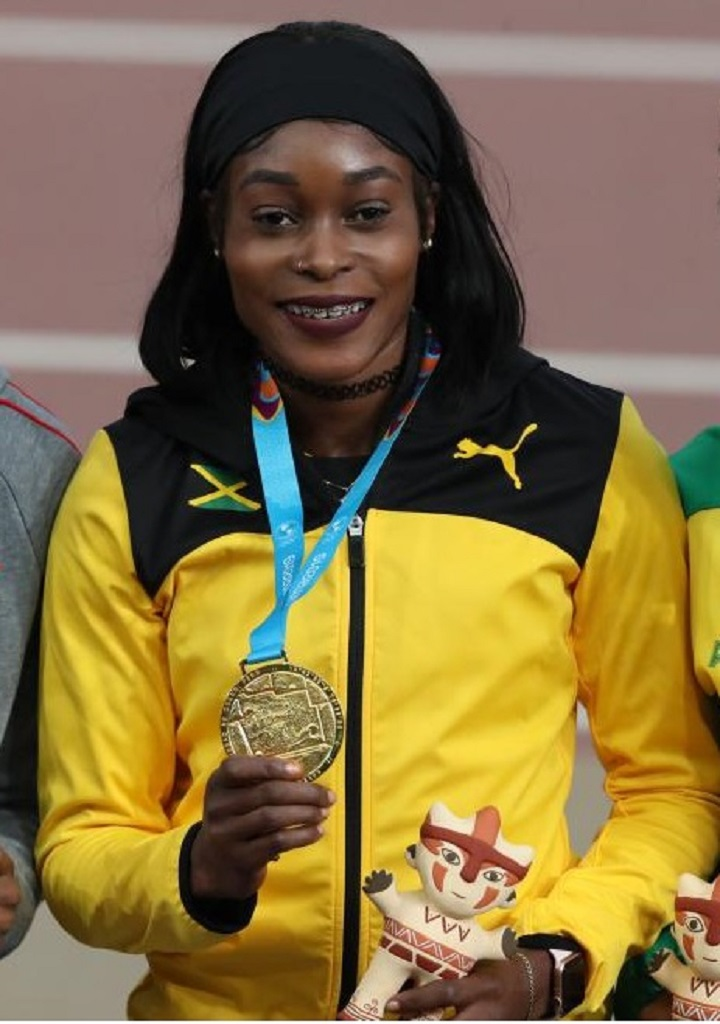
Jamaican Elaine Thompson-Herah, World Leader (WL) in 100 metres 2020 women's outdoor season.

| # | Time | Wind | Athlete | Country | Venue | Date |
|---|---|---|---|---|---|---|
| 1 | 10.85 | +0.2 | Elaine Thompson-Herah | Jamaica | Stadio Olimpico, Roma (ITA) | 17 September 2020 |
| 2 | 10.86 | +0.9 | Shelly-Ann Fraser-Pryce | Jamaica | National Stadium, Kingston (JAM) | 22 August 2020 |
| 3 | 10.95 | +1.1 | Sha'Carri Richardson | United States | Montverde Academy, Montverde, FL (USA) | 10 August 2020 |
| 4 | 10.98 | +1.4 | Shaunae Miller-Uibo | Bahamas | National Training Center, Clermont, FL (USA) | 24 July 2020 |
| 5 | 11.08 | +0.7 | Ajla Del Ponte | Switzerland | Stade Bouleyres, Bulle (SUI) | 11 July 2020 |
| 6 | 11.11 | +1.3 | Rebekka Haase | Germany | Sportanlage am Weinweg, Regensburg (GER) | 26 July 2020 |
| 7 | 11.12 | +0.2 | Aleia Hobbs | United States | Stadio Olimpico, Roma (ITA) | 17 September 2020 |
| 8 | 11.14 | +0.5 | Hannah Cunliffe | United States | Montverde Academy, Montverde, FL (USA) | 04 July 2020 |
| 8 | 11.14 | +0.2 | Marie-Josée Ta Lou | Ivory Coast | Stadio Olimpico, Roma (ITA) | 17 September 2020 |
| 10 | 11.15 | +1.4 | Tamari Davis | United States | National Training Center, Clermont, FL (USA) | 24 July 2020 |
| 10 | 11.15 | +1.9 | Natalliah Whyte | Jamaica | National Training Center, Clermont, FL (USA) | 24 July 2020 |
| 12 | 11.16 | +0.1 | Imani Lansiquot | United Kingdom | Stadion Manfort, Leverkusen (GER) | 16 August 2020 |
| 12 | 11.16 | +1.0 | Gabriela Anahi Suarez | Ecuador | Quito (ECU) | 12 DEC 2020 |
| 14 | 11.18 | +1.5 | Kayla White | United States | Drake Stadium, Des Moines, IA (USA) | 29 August 2020 |
| 15 | 11.19 | +1.3 | Lisa Marie Kwayie | Germany | Sportanlage am Weinweg, Regensburg (GER) | 26 July 2020 |
| 16 | 11.20 | +1.4 | Shashalee Forbes | Jamaica | National Stadium, Kingston (JAM) | 08 August 2020 |
| 16 | 11.20 | +0.6 | Rhoda Njobvu | Zambia | National Heroes Stadium, Lusaka (ZAM) | 06 DEC 2020 |
| 18 | 11.21 | +1.8 | Mujinga Kambundji | Switzerland | Stadion Hard, Langenthal (SUI) | 05 August 2020 |
| 18 | 11.21 | +2.0 | Tatjana Pinto | Germany | Stade de La Charrière, La Chaux-de-Fonds (SUI) | 15 August 2020 |
| 20 | 11.22 | +0.9 | Jasmine Camacho-Quinn | Puerto Rico | National Training Center, Clermont, FL (USA) | 24 July 2020 |
| 21 | 11.23 | +1.4 | Jennifer Montag | Germany | Stadion, Wetzlar (GER) | 18 July 2020 |
| 21 | 11.23 | +1.1 | Bassant Hemida | Egypt | Mestský Stadion Sletište, Kladno (CZE) | 16 September 2020 |
| 23 | 11.24 | +1.3 | Ewa Swoboda | Poland | Zdzislaw Krzyszkowiak Stadium, Bydgoszcz (POL) | 19 August 2020 |
| 24 | 11.25 | +0.3 | Natasha Morrison | Jamaica | National Stadium, Kingston (JAM) | 08 August 2020 |
| 24 | 11.25 | +1.1 | Kourtni Johnson | United States | Montverde Academy, Montverde, FL (USA) | 10 August 2020 |
| 24 | 11.25 | +1.2 | Nadine Visser | Netherlands | Atletiekbaan Maarschalkerweerd, Utrecht (NED) | 29 August 2020 |
| 27 | 11.26 | +0.1 | Dafne Schippers | Netherlands | Olympiastadion, Berlin (GER) | 13 September 2020 |
| 28 | 11.27 | +1.4 | Lynna Irby | United States | National Training Center, Clermont, FL (USA) | 24 July 2020 |
| 28 | 11.27 | +1.5 | Kristina Marie Knott | Philippines | Drake Stadium, Des Moines, IA (USA) | 29 August 2020 |
| 28 | 11.27 | 0.0 | Kristal Awuah | United Kingdom | Suhaim bin Hamad Stadium, Doha (QAT) | 25 September 2020 |
| 31 | 11.28 | +1.3 | Marije Van Hunenstijn | Netherlands | Olympiastadion, Stockholm (SWE) | 23 August 2020 |
| 31 | 11.28 | +0.6 | Carolle Zahi | France | Stadium Municipal, Albi (FRA) | 12 September 2020 |
| 33 | 11.29 | +1.1 | Tia Clayton | Jamaica | GC Foster College, Spanish Town (JAM) | 19 February 2020 |
| 33 | 11.29 | +1.3 | Amelie-Sophie Lederer | Germany | Sportanlage am Weinweg, Regensburg (GER) | 26 July 2020 |
| 33 | 11.29 | -0.1 | Lisa Nippgen | Germany | Sepp-Herberger-Stadion, Weinheim (GER) | 01 August 2020 |
| 36 | 11.30 | +2.0 | Anna Bongiorni | Italy | Centro Sportivo Fontanassa, Savona (ITA) | 16 July 2020 |
| 36 | 11.30 | +0.3 | Vitoria Cristina Rosa | Brazil | COTP Stadium, São Paulo (BRA) | 06 DEC 2020 |
| 38 | 11.31 | +0.2 | Manqi Ge | China | Fuzhou (CHN) | 23 May 2020 |
| 38 | 11.31 | +0.9 | Ivet Lalova-Collio | Bulgaria | Guidobaldi, Rieti (ITA) | 23 July 2020 |
| 38 | 11.31 | +0.4 | Gina Lückenkemper | Germany | Stade Louis II, Monaco (MON) | 14 August 2020 |
| 38 | 11.31 | +1.3 | Daryll Neita | United Kingdom | Zdzislaw Krzyszkowiak Stadium, Bydgoszcz (POL) | 19 August 2020 |
| 42 | 11.32 | +1.5 | Yunisleidy García | Cuba | Estadio Panamericano, La Habana (CUB) | 20 March 2020 |
| 42 | 11.32 | +0.2 | Lilly Kaden | Germany | Frankenstadion, Heilbronn (GER) | 05 September 2020 |
| 44 | 11.33 | +1.2 | Naomi Sedney | Netherlands | Atletiekbaan Maarschalkerweerd, Utrecht (NED) | 29 August 2020 |
| 44 | 11.33 | +0.8 | Ana Carolina Azevedo | Brazil | CNDA, Bragança Paulista (BRA) | 17 DEC 2020 |
| 46 | 11.34 | +0.9 | Laura Müller | Germany | Sepp-Herberger-Stadion, Weinheim (GER) | 01 August 2020 |
| 47 | 11.35 | +1.5 | Kevona Davis | Jamaica | National Stadium, Kingston (JAM) | 06 March 2020 |
| 47 | 11.35 | +1.4 | Lisa Mayer | Germany | Stadion, Wetzlar (GER) | 18 July 2020 |
| 47 | 11.35 | +0.9 | Gloria Hooper | Italy | Guidobaldi, Rieti (ITA) | 23 July 2020 |
| 47 | 11.35 | -0.2 | Mei Kodama | Japan | Denka Big Swan Stadium, Niigata (JPN) | 12 September 2020 |
| 51 | 11.36 | -0.8 | Murielle Ahouré | Ivory Coast | Life College, Marietta, GA (USA) | 01 August 2020 |
| 52 | 11.38 | +1.6 | Zoe Hobbs | New Zealand | Hawkes Bay Sports Park, Hastings (NZL) | 25 January 2020 |
| 52 | 11.38 | +1.1 | Brandy Hall | Jamaica | GC Foster College, Spanish Town (JAM) | 19 February 2020 |
| 52 | 11.38 | +0.4 | Mikiah Brisco | United States | Life College, Marietta, GA (USA) | 15 August 2020 |
| 52 | 11.38 | +0.6 | Wided Atatou | France | Stadium Municipal, Albi (FRA) | 12 September 2020 |
| 52 | 11.38 | +1.1 | Irene Siragusa | Italy | Mestský Stadion Sletište, Kladno (CZE) | 16 September 2020 |
| 52 | 11.38 | +1.5 | Beatrice Masilingi | Namibia | Windhoek (NAM) | 17 DEC 2020 |
| 58 | 11.39 | +1.1 | Corinna Schwab | Germany | Heinz-Steyer-Stadion, Dresden (GER) | 10 July 2020 |
| 58 | 11.39 | +0.7 | Rani Rosius | Belgium | Boudewijnstadion, Bruxelles (BEL) | 16 August 2020 |
| 58 | 11.39 | +1.8 | Amy Hunt | United Kingdom | Slottsskogsvallen, Göteborg (SWE) | 29 August 2020 |
| 58 | 11.39 | +0.8 | Arialis Josefa Gandulla | Cuba | Stadio Quercia, Rovereto (ITA) | 08 September 2020 |

== See also ==
- 2019 in 100 metres
- 2021 in 100 metres
