= Athletics at the 2012 Summer Olympics – Women's 200 metres =

Women's 200 metres at the Games of the XXX Olympiad
- Venue: Olympic Stadium
- Date: 6–8 August
- Competitors: 54 from 39 nations
- Winning time: 21.88

Medalists
1st place, gold medalist(s)		Allyson Felix	United States
2nd place, silver medalist(s)		Shelly-Ann Fraser-Pryce	Jamaica
3rd place, bronze medalist(s)		Carmelita Jeter	United States

Official Video

The Women's 200 metres competition at the 2012 Summer Olympics in London, United Kingdom. The event was held at the Olympic Stadium on 6–8 August. The winning margin was 0.21 seconds.

The times in the three semi-finals were very close, but while Allyson Felix appeared to put a minimum of effort to hold off Murielle Ahouré in heat two, in heat one Veronica Campbell Brown dipped at the finish to edge Carmelita Jeter and in heat three Sanya Richards-Ross raced Shelly-Ann Fraser-Pryce to the line. Semoy Hackett set the Trinidad and Tobago national record as the first time qualifier, Myriam Soumaré only one hundredth behind as the other time qualifier in 22.56.

In the final Felix took lead through the turn and extended it to the finish. Campbell-Brown was second coming into the straight but was overtaken by Fraser-Pryce and Jeter who took the silver and bronze respectively.

== Competition format ==
The Women's 200m competition consisted of heats (Round 1), semifinals and a Final. The fastest competitors from each race in the heats qualified for the semifinals along with the fastest overall competitors not already qualified that were required to fill the available spaces in the semifinals. A total of eight competitors qualified for the Final from the semifinals.

== Records ==
Prior to the competition, the existing World and Olympic records were as follows.

World record	Florence Griffith Joyner (USA)	21.34	Seoul, Korea	29 September 1988
Olympic record	Florence Griffith Joyner (USA)	21.34	Seoul, Korea	29 September 1988
2012 World leading	Allyson Felix (USA)	21.69	Eugene, United States	30 June 2012

== Schedule ==
All times are British Summer Time (UTC+1)

Date	Time	Round
Monday, 6 August 2012	19:20	Round 1
Tuesday, 7 August 2012	20:25	Semifinals
Wednesday, 8 August 2012	21:00	Finals

== Results ==
Heats Official Video

=== Round 1 ===
Qual. rule: first 3 of each heat (Q) plus the 6 fastest times (q) qualified.

==== Heat 1 ====
Wind:
Heat 1: +0.5 m/s

Rank	Athlete	Nation	Time	Notes
1	Murielle Ahouré	Ivory Coast	22.55	Q
2	Aleksandra Fedoriva	Russia	22.61	Q
3	Margaret Adeoye	Great Britain	22.94	Q, PB
4	Allison Peter	Virgin Islands	23.00	q
5	Christy Udoh	Nigeria	23.19	
6	Andreea Ogrăzeanu	Romania	23.46	
7	Anna Kiełbasińska	Poland	23.67	
8	Hinikissia Albertine Ndikert	Chad	26.06	
	Marlena Wesh	Haiti	DNS	

==== Heat 2 ====
Wind:
Heat 2: +1.2 m/s

Rank	Athlete	Nation	Time	Notes
1	Allyson Felix	United States	22.71	Q
2	Semoy Hackett	Trinidad and Tobago	22.81	Q
3	Janelle Redhead	Grenada	23.08	Q, SB
4	Anyika Onuora	Great Britain	23.23	
5	Elizabeta Savlinis	Russia	23.23	
6	Gloria Hooper	Italy	23.25	
7	Debbie Ferguson-McKenzie	Bahamas	23.49	
8	Vida Anim	Ghana	23.71	SB
9	Ndeye Fatou Soumah	Senegal	23.89	

==== Heat 3 ====
Wind:
Heat 3: +0.7 m/s

Rank	Athlete	Nation	Time	Notes
1	Carmelita Jeter	United States	22.65	Q
2	Abiodun Oyepitan	Great Britain	22.92	Q
3	Sherone Simpson	Jamaica	22.97	Q
4	Maria Belibasaki	Greece	23.36	
5	Ana Claudia Silva	Brazil	23.40	
6	Gloria Asumnu	Nigeria	23.43	
7	Chisato Fukushima	Japan	24.14	
8	Gretta Taslakian	Lebanon	24.49	
	Cydonie Mothersill	Cayman Islands	DNS	

==== Heat 4 ====
Wind:
Heat 4: +0.3 m/s

Rank	Athlete	Nation	Time	Notes
1	Sanya Richards-Ross	United States	22.48	Q
2	LaVerne Jones-Ferrette	Virgin Islands	22.64	Q, SB
3	Hrystyna Stuy	Ukraine	22.66	Q, PB
4	Kai Selvon	Trinidad and Tobago	22.85	q, PB
5	Ivet Lalova	Bulgaria	23.01	q, SB
6	Eleni Artymata	Cyprus	23.09	q, SB
7	Norma González	Colombia	23.46	SB
8	Nercely Soto	Venezuela	23.54	
9	Vladislava Ovcharenko	Tajikistan	24.39	

==== Heat 5 ====
Wind:
Heat 5: +1.3 m/s

Rank	Athlete	Nation	Time	Notes
1	Mariya Ryemyen	Ukraine	22.58	Q, PB
2	Myriam Soumaré	France	22.70	Q, SB
3	Veronica Campbell Brown	Jamaica	22.75	Q
4	Léa Sprunger	Switzerland	23.27	
5	Ezinne Okparaebo	Norway	23.30	=NR
6	Natalia Rusakova	Russia	23.40	
7	Erika Chávez	Ecuador	23.70	
8	Kirsten Nieuwendam	Suriname	24.07	
9	Chan Seyha	Cambodia	26.62	

==== Heat 6 ====
Wind:
Heat 6: +0.8 m/s

Rank	Athlete	Nation	Time	Notes
1	Shelly-Ann Fraser-Pryce	Jamaica	22.71	Q
2	Anthonique Strachan	Bahamas	22.75	Q
3	Elyzaveta Bryzgina	Ukraine	22.82	Q
4	Evelyn dos Santos	Brazil	23.07	q
5	Crystal Emmanuel	Canada	23.10	q, SB
6	Marielis Sánchez	Dominican Republic	23.20	SB
7	Viktoriya Zyabkina	Kazakhstan	23.49	
8	Nelkis Casabona	Cuba	23.82	
9	Luan Gabriel	Dominica	24.12	

=== Semi-final ===
Semi-final Official Video

Qual. rule: first 2 of each heat (Q) plus the 2 fastest times (q) qualified.

==== Heat 1 ====
Wind:
Heat 1: +1.0 m/s

Rank	Athlete	Nation	Time	Notes
1	Veronica Campbell Brown	Jamaica	22.32	Q, SB
2	Carmelita Jeter	United States	22.39	Q
3	Myriam Soumare	France	22.56	q, SB
4	Mariya Ryemyen	Ukraine	22.62	
5	Anthonique Strachan	Bahamas	22.82	
6	Ivet Lalova	Bulgaria	22.98	SB
7	Margaret Adeoye	Great Britain	23.28	
8	Allison Peter	Virgin Islands	23.35	

==== Heat 2 ====
Wind:
Heat 2: +1.0 m/s

Rank	Athlete	Nation	Time	Notes
1	Allyson Felix	United States	22.31	Q
2	Murielle Ahouré	Ivory Coast	22.49	Q
3	Semoy Hackett	Trinidad and Tobago	22.55	q, =NR
4	Laverne Jones-Ferrette	Virgin Islands	22.62	SB
5	Elyzaveta Bryzgina	Ukraine	22.64	SB
6	Sherone Simpson	Jamaica	22.71	
7	Evelyn dos Santos	Brazil	22.82	PB
8	Eleni Artymata	Cyprus	22.92	SB

==== Heat 3 ====
Wind:
Heat 3: +0.8 m/s

Rank	Athlete	Nation	Time	Notes
1	Sanya Richards-Ross	United States	22.30	Q
2	Shelly-Ann Fraser-Pryce	Jamaica	22.34	Q
3	Aleksandra Fedoriva	Russia	22.65	
4	Hrystyna Stuy	Ukraine	22.76	
5	Kai Selvon	Trinidad and Tobago	23.04	
6	Abiodun Oyepitan	Great Britain	23.14	
7	Crystal Emmanuel	Canada	23.28	
8	Janelle Redhead	Grenada	23.51	

=== Final ===
Wind: -0.2 m/s

Rank	Lanes	Athlete	Nation	Time	Notes
1st place, gold medalist(s)	7	Allyson Felix	United States	21.88	
2nd place, silver medalist(s)	4	Shelly-Ann Fraser-Pryce	Jamaica	22.09	PB
3rd place, bronze medalist(s)	9	Carmelita Jeter	United States	22.14	
4	5	Veronica Campbell Brown	Jamaica	22.38	
5	6	Sanya Richards-Ross	United States	22.39	
6	8	Murielle Ahouré	Ivory Coast	22.57	
7	2	Myriam Soumaré	France	22.63	
–	3	Semoy Hackett	Trinidad and Tobago	~~22.87~~	DQ
