= Track and field at the 2011 Military World Games – Women's 200 metres =

The women's 200 metres event at the 2011 Military World Games was held on 22 and 23 July at the Estádio Olímpico João Havelange.

== Records ==
Prior to this competition, the existing world and CISM record were as follows:

World Record	Florence Griffith Joyner (USA)	21.34	Seoul, South Korea	29 September 1988
CISM World Record	Yekaterina Leshchova (RUS)	23.24	Zagreb, Croatia	August 1999

== Schedule ==
Date	Time	Round
22 July 2011		Semifinals
23 July 2011	09:35	Final

== Medalists ==
Gold	Silver	Bronze
Ana Cláudia Silva; Brazil	Mariya Ryemyen; Ukraine	Olesya Povh; Ukraine

== Results ==
=== Final ===
Wind: -0.4 m/s

Rank	Lane	Name	Nationality	Time	Notes
1st place, gold medalist(s)	6	Ana Cláudia Silva	Brazil	23.01	CR
2nd place, silver medalist(s)	3	Mariya Ryemyen	Ukraine	23.27	
3rd place, bronze medalist(s)	5	Olesya Povh	Ukraine	23.40	
4	4	Andriana Ferra	Greece	23.61	
5	7	Marta Jeschke	Poland	23.68	
6	1	Johanna Danois	France	23.93	
7	8	Vanda Gomes	Brazil	24.04	
8	2	Ewelina Ptak	Poland	24.38	
