= 2012 European Athletics Championships – Women's 200 metres =

Women's 200 metres at the European Athletics Championships

The women's 200 metres at the 2012 European Athletics Championships were held at the Helsinki Olympic Stadium on 29 and 30 June.

== Medalists ==
Gold	Mariya Ryemyen; Ukraine
Silver	Hrystyna Stuy; Ukraine
Bronze	Myriam Soumaré; France

== Records ==
Standing records prior to the 2012 European Athletics Championships
World record	Florence Griffith Joyner (USA)	21.34	Seoul, South Korea	29 September 1988
European record	Marita Koch (GER)	21.71	Karl-Marx-Stadt, East Germany	10 June 1979
European record	Marita Koch (GER)	21.71	Potsdam, East Germany	21 July 1984
European record	Heike Drechsler (GER)	21.71	Jena, East Germany	29 June 1986
European record	Heike Drechsler (GER)	21.71	Stuttgart, West Germany	29 August 1986
Championship record	Heike Drechsler (GER)	21.71	Stuttgart, West Germany	29 August 1986
World Leading	Sanya Richards-Ross (USA)	22.09	New York City, United States	9 June 2012
European Leading	Yelizaveta Bryzhina (UKR)	22.69	Yalta, Ukraine	14 June 2012

== Schedule ==
Date	Time	Round
29 June 2012	14:00	Round 1
29 June 2012	20:55	Semifinals
30 June 2012	20:50	Final

== Results ==
=== Round 1 ===
First 4 in each heat (Q) and 4 best performers (q) advance to the Semifinals.

Wind:
Heat 1: −0.6 m/s, Heat 2: 0.0 m/s, Heat 3: +0.6 m/s, Heat 4: +0.7 m/s, Heat 5: −0.6 m/s

Rank	Heat	Lane	Name	Nationality	Time	Note
1	4	6	Mariya Ryemyen	Ukraine	22.77	Q
2	4	7	Gloria Hooper	Italy	22.95	Q, PB
3	2	5	Viktoriya Pyatachenko	Ukraine	22.96	Q
4	5	7	Abiodun Oyepitan	Great Britain	23.05	Q
5	2	3	Léa Sprunger	Switzerland	23.08	Q, PB
6	2	6	Lina Jacques-Sébastien	France	23.09	Q
7	1	7	Myriam Soumaré	France	23.10	Q
8	3	5	Dafne Schippers	Netherlands	23.11	Q
9	4	5	Hanne Claes	Belgium	23.26	Q, PB
10	3	2	Hrystyna Stuy	Ukraine	23.30	Q
11	1	3	Jamile Samuel	Netherlands	23.35	Q
11	5	3	Eleni Artymata	Cyprus	23.35	Q
13	2	7	Yekaterina Voronenkova	Russia	23.37	Q
14	4	4	Johanna Danois	France	23.42	Q
15	4	3	Nimet Karakuş	Turkey	23.50	q, =NUR
16	3	6	Andreea Ograzeanu	Romania	23.54	Q
17	1	2	María Belibasáki	Greece	23.55	Q
18	5	4	Ivet Lalova	Bulgaria	23.58	Q
19	1	5	Marika Popowicz	Poland	23.64	Q
20	3	3	Olivia Borlée	Belgium	23.77	Q
21	2	2	Kateřina Čechová	Czech Republic	23.78	q
22	5	6	Inna Weit	Germany	23.89	Q
23	3	4	Kristina Žumer	Slovenia	23.95	q
24	1	6	Éva Kaptur	Hungary	23.97	q
25	3	7	Sónia Tavares	Portugal	24.00	
26	4	2	Amy Foster	Ireland	24.04	
27	1	4	Anna Hämäläinen	Finland	24.14	
28	5	2	Jacqueline Gasser	Switzerland	24.18	
29	2	4	Diane Borg	Malta	24.68	
30	5	5	Sònia Villacampa	Andorra	27.90	

=== Semifinals ===
First 2 in each heat (Q) and 2 best performers (q) advance to the Semifinals.

Wind:
Heat 1: 0.0 m/s, Heat 2: −0.1 m/s, Heat 3: −0.2 m/s

Rank	Heat	Lane	Name	Nationality	Time	Note
1	1	4	Dafne Schippers	Netherlands	22.70	Q, SB
2	2	6	Mariya Ryemyen	Ukraine	22.82	Q
3	1	5	Viktoriya Pyatachenko	Ukraine	23.04	Q
4	3	3	Myriam Soumaré	France	23.04	Q
5	3	5	Hrystyna Stuy	Ukraine	23.08	Q
6	3	4	Jamile Samuel	Netherlands	23.13	q
7	1	6	Eleni Artymata	Cyprus	23.21	q
8	3	6	Abiodun Oyepitan	Great Britain	23.22	
9	3	7	Ivet Lalova	Bulgaria	23.26	SB
10	1	8	María Belibasáki	Greece	23.31	
11	2	8	Johanna Danois	France	23.40	Q
12	1	3	Lina Jacques-Sébastien	France	23.45	
13	2	4	Léa Sprunger	Switzerland	23.49	
14	1	7	Marika Popowicz	Poland	23.58	
15	3	8	Yekaterina Voronenkova	Russia	23.61	
16	3	2	Kateřina Čechová	Czech Republic	23.64	
17	1	2	Olivia Borlée	Belgium	23.66	
18	2	7	Andreea Ograzeanu	Romania	23.66	
19	2	5	Hanne Claes	Belgium	23.68	
20	2	2	Inna Weit	Germany	23.95	
21	1	1	Kristina Žumer	Slovenia	24.20	
22	2	1	Éva Kaptur	Hungary	24.44	
	2	3	Gloria Hooper	Italy	DQ	
	3	1	Nimet Karakuş	Turkey	DNS	

=== Final ===
Wind: -1.3 m/s

Rank	Lane	Name	Nationality	Time	Note
1st place, gold medalist(s)	3	Mariya Ryemyen	Ukraine	23.05	
2nd place, silver medalist(s)	7	Hrystyna Stuy	Ukraine	23.17	
3rd place, bronze medalist(s)	5	Myriam Soumaré	France	23.21	
4	6	Viktoriya Pyatachenko	Ukraine	23.25	
5	4	Dafne Schippers	Netherlands	23.53	
6	1	Jamile Samuel	Netherlands	23.55	
7	2	Eleni Artymata	Cyprus	23.59	
8	8	Johanna Danois	France	23.61	
