= 2011 European Athletics Indoor Championships – Women's 60 metres =

The Women's 60 metres event at the 2011 European Athletics Indoor Championships was held on March 5–6, 2011 with the final on March 6 at 16:40.

== Records ==
Standing records prior to the 2011 European Athletics Indoor Championships
World record	Irina Privalova (RUS)	6.92	Madrid, Spain	11 February 1993
World record	Irina Privalova (RUS)	6.92	Madrid, Spain	9 February 1995
European record	Irina Privalova (RUS)	6.92	Madrid, Spain	11 February 1993
European record	Irina Privalova (RUS)	6.92	Madrid, Spain	9 February 1995
Championship record	Nelli Cooman (NED)	7.00	Madrid, Spain	23 February 1986
World Leading	Veronica Campbell-Brown (JAM)	7.11	New York City, United States	28 January 2011
European Leading	Olesya Povh (UKR)	7.13	Düsseldorf, Germany	11 February 2011

== Results ==
=== Heats ===
First 3 in each heat and 4 best performers advanced to the Semifinals.

Rank	Heat	Name	Nationality	React	Time	Notes
1	4	Mariya Ryemyen	Ukraine	0.210	7.17	Q
2	2	Olesya Povh	Ukraine	0.147	7.18	Q
3	1	Ezinne Okparaebo	Norway	0.170	7.21	Q
4	1	Véronique Mang	France	0.174	7.27	Q
4	3	Hrystyna Stuy	Ukraine	0.207	7.27	Q, PB
4	3	Myriam Soumaré	France	0.227	7.27	Q
7	2	Georgia Kokloni	Greece	0.188	7.28	Q
7	2	Lina Grinčikaitė	Lithuania	0.211	7.28	Q, PB
9	2	Dafne Schippers	Netherlands	0.214	7.30	q
9	4	Bernice Wilson	Great Britain	0.177	7.30	Q
11	3	Jodie Williams	Great Britain	0.194	7.31	Q
12	1	Manuela Levorato	Italy	0.223	7.34	Q
13	1	Digna Luz Murillo	Spain	0.184	7.35	q
14	4	Sónia Tavares	Portugal	0.168	7.36	Q, PB
15	4	Inna Eftimova	Bulgaria	0.226	7.37	q
16	3	Ailis McSweeney	Ireland	0.191	7.38	q
17	1	Tanja Mitić	Serbia	0.193	7.42	
17	4	Kateřina Čechová	Czech Republic	0.201	7.42	
19	3	Lena Berntsson	Sweden	0.201	7.45	
20	4	Amparo María Cotán	Spain	0.212	7.46	
21	1	Sara Strajnar	Slovenia	0.146	7.49	
22	3	Nina Kovačič	Slovenia	0.175	7.49	
23	2	Andreea Ogrăzeanu	Romania	0.204	7.50	
24	2	Sandra Parlov	Croatia	0.172	7.60	
25	2	Diane Borg	Malta	0.174	7.69	

=== Semifinals ===
First 4 in each heat advanced to the Final.

Rank	Heat	Name	Nationality	React	Time	Notes
1	2	Olesya Povh	Ukraine	0.178	7.13	Q, =EL
2	1	Mariya Ryemyen	Ukraine	0.234	7.16	Q
3	2	Myriam Soumaré	France	0.202	7.18	Q, PB
4	1	Véronique Mang	France	0.146	7.20	Q
4	2	Ezinne Okparaebo	Norway	0.161	7.20	Q
6	2	Jodie Williams	Great Britain	0.157	7.21	Q, PB
7	1	Hrystyna Stuy	Ukraine	0.217	7.22	Q, PB
8	2	Georgia Kokloni	Greece	0.216	7.23	SB
9	1	Lina Grinčikaitė	Lithuania	0.194	7.27	Q, PB
10	1	Bernice Wilson	Great Britain	0.198	7.28	
11	1	Dafne Schippers	Netherlands	0.170	7.30	
12	2	Inna Eftimova	Bulgaria	0.178	7.32	
13	1	Ailis McSweeney	Ireland	0.161	7.34	
13	2	Manuela Levorato	Italy	0.163	7.34	
15	2	Digna Luz Murillo	Spain	0.173	7.36	
16	1	Sónia Tavares	Portugal	0.183	7.40	

=== Final ===
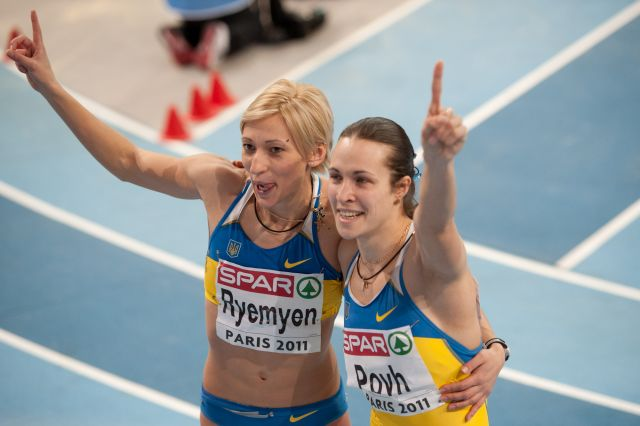
Silver and gold medallist Ryemyen and Povh.

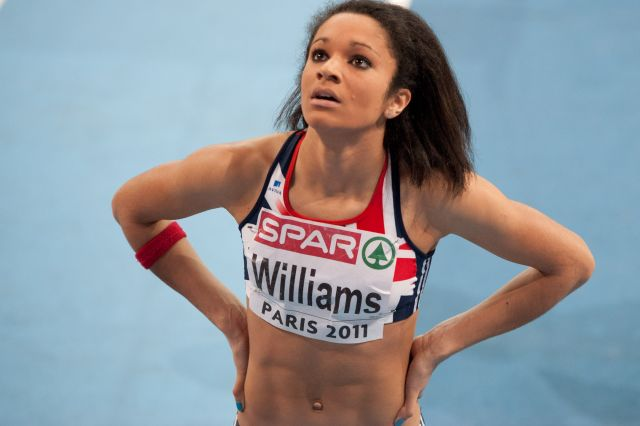
Fourth-place finisher, Jodie Williams.

The final was held at 16:40.

Rank	Lane	Name	Nationality	React	Time	Notes
1st place, gold medalist(s)	6	Olesya Povh	Ukraine	0.156	7.13	=EL
2nd place, silver medalist(s)	3	Mariya Ryemyen	Ukraine	0.222	7.15	=PB
3rd place, bronze medalist(s)	7	Ezinne Okparaebo	Norway	0.152	7.20	
4	2	Jodie Williams	Great Britain	0.156	7.21	=PB
5	8	Hrystyna Stuy	Ukraine	0.196	7.21	PB
6	4	Véronique Mang	France	0.151	7.22	
7	5	Myriam Soumaré	France	0.195	7.24	
–	1	Lina Grinčikaitė	Lithuania		DNS	
