= Athletics at the 2011 Summer Universiade – Women's 100 metres =

The women's 100 metres event at the 2011 Summer Universiade was held on 16–17 August.

== Medalists ==
Gold	Silver	Bronze
Carrie Russell; Jamaica	Hrystyna Stuy; Ukraine	Lina Grinčikaitė; Lithuania

== Results ==
=== Heats ===
Qualification: First three in each heat (Q) and the next eight fastest (q) qualified for the quarterfinals.

Wind:
Heat 1: -0.4 m/s, Heat 2: -0.4 m/s, Heat 3: -0.1 m/s, Heat 4: +0.2 m/s, Heat 5: 0.0 m/s, Heat 6: -0.1 m/s, Heat 7: -0.2 m/s, Heat 8: +0.7 m/s

Rank	Heat	Name	Nationality	Time	Notes
1	3	Carrie Russell	Jamaica	11.41	Q
2	4	Lina Grinčikaitė	Lithuania	11.41	Q
3	7	Sonia Tavares	Portugal	11.51	Q
4	6	Yevgeniya Polyakova	Russia	11.53	Q
5	4	Shayla Mahan	United States	11.58	Q
6	2	Lakya Brookins	United States	11.59	Q
7	7	Rosângela Santos	Brazil	11.62	Q
8	1	Hrystyna Stuy	Ukraine	11.65	Q
8	5	Nataliya Pohrebnyak	Ukraine	11.65	Q
10	2	Amy Foster	Ireland	11.67	Q
11	2	Shakera Reece	Barbados	11.69	Q
12	5	Yulia Kashina	Russia	11.70	Q
13	8	Ashleigh Nelson	Great Britain	11.78	Q
14	1	Andreea Ograzeanu	Romania	11.80	Q
14	6	Maryam Tousi	Iran	11.80	Q, NR
16	5	Amparo Cotán	Spain	11.82	Q
17	1	Kauiza Venâncio	Brazil	11.86	Q
17	8	Émilie Gaydu	France	11.86	Q
19	4	Marie Josée Ta Lou	Ivory Coast	11.87	Q
20	3	Kana Ichikawa	Japan	11.90	Q
21	8	Fong Yeepui	Hong Kong	11.91	Q, PB
22	6	Cindy Stewart	South Africa	11.92	Q
22	7	Nongnuch Sanrat	Thailand	11.92	Q
24	6	Olga Bludova	Kazakhstan	11.93	q
25	1	Siti Zubaidah Adabi	Malaysia	11.94	q, SB
26	2	Gretta Taslakian	Lebanon	11.96	q
26	3	Fanny Appes Ekanga	Cameroon	11.96	Q, PB
28	8	Huang Yanli	China	12.01	q
28	3	Sara Strajnar	Slovenia	12.01	q
30	1	Éva Kaptur	Hungary	12.02	q
30	7	Lorène Bazolo	Republic of the Congo	12.02	q, SB
32	5	Siti Fatima Mohamad	Malaysia	12.04	q
33	2	Cherese Jones	South Africa	12.05	
34	4	Siri Eritsland	Norway	12.06	
35	4	Anna Olsson	Denmark	12.07	
35	3	Serafi Anelies Unani	Indonesia	12.07	
37	4	Pimpika Kannikom	Thailand	12.09	
38	4	Sunayna Wahi	Suriname	12.09	PB
39	7	Erika Chávez	Ecuador	12.14	
40	7	Leung Hausze	Hong Kong	12.16	
41	6	Anatercia Quive	Mozambique	12.19	
42	8	Silva Pesackaitė	Lithuania	12.20	
43	6	Kang Daseul	South Korea	12.23	
44	8	Marlēna Reimane	Latvia	12.30	
45	1	Wendy Reynoso	Dominican Republic	12.35	
46	2	Enirahs Martina	Netherlands Antilles	12.40	
47	5	Lidiya Shakhvorostova	Uzbekistan	12.48	
48	7	Ieong Loi	Macau	12.50	PB
49	6	Nika Barundic	Slovenia	12.57	
50	3	Arviena Vis	Netherlands Antilles	12.71	PB
51	6	Olgerta Gjylapi	Albania	12.74	
52	8	Marietou Badji	Senegal	12.91	
53	7	Demalathiw Priyadarshani	Sri Lanka	13.01	
54	5	Nazmun Nahar Beauty	Bangladesh	13.07	
55	1	Alice Ikabongo Ikabongo	Zambia	13.28	
56	8	Kashany Rios	Panama	13.33	
57	1	Nguyen Thi Hang	Vietnam	13.34	
58	2	Io Inchi	Macau	13.36	SB
59	3	Thabo Muswere	Botswana	13.48	
60	5	Onkemetse Ramhikela	Botswana	14.02	
	4	Beaulah Mufambisi	Zimbabwe	DNS	

=== Quarterfinals ===
Qualification: First three in each heat (Q) and the next four fastest (q) qualified for the semifinals.

Wind:
Heat 1: +0.7 m/s, Heat 2: +0.4 m/s, Heat 3: -0.4 m/s, Heat 4: -0.1 m/s

Rank	Heat	Name	Nationality	Time	Notes
1	4	Carrie Russell	Jamaica	11.32	Q
2	2	Lina Grinčikaitė	Lithuania	11.43	Q
3	1	Hrystyna Stuy	Ukraine	11.49	Q
4	1	Sonia Tavares	Portugal	11.53	Q
5	2	Nataliya Pohrebnyak	Ukraine	11.55	Q
6	3	Yevgeniya Polyakova	Russia	11.57	Q
7	4	Ashleigh Nelson	Great Britain	11.58	Q
8	2	Rosângela Santos	Brazil	11.60	Q
8	4	Shayla Mahan	United States	11.60	Q
10	3	Amy Foster	Ireland	11.64	Q
11	4	Shakera Reece	Barbados	11.70	q
12	3	Lakya Brookins	United States	11.72	Q
13	3	Andreea Ograzeanu	Romania	11.74	q
14	1	Maryam Tousi	Iran	11.81	Q
15	1	Yulia Kashina	Russia	11.81	q
16	2	Amparo Cotán	Spain	11.83	q (11.826)
17	1	Kauiza Venâncio	Brazil	11.83	(11.828)
18	4	Olga Bludova	Kazakhstan	11.88	
19	2	Nongnuch Sanrat	Thailand	12.00	
19	4	Kana Ichikawa	Japan	12.00	
21	1	Gretta Taslakian	Lebanon	12.01	
22	2	Éva Kaptur	Hungary	12.02	
22	3	Marie Josée Ta Lou	Ivory Coast	12.02	
24	1	Lorène Bazolo	Republic of the Congo	12.05	
24	3	Fong Yeepui	Hong Kong	12.05	
24	4	Siti Fatima Mohamad	Malaysia	12.05	
27	2	Siti Zubaidah Adabi	Malaysia	12.06	
28	1	Cindy Stewart	South Africa	12.09	
29	3	Sara Strajnar	Slovenia	12.12	
29	4	Fanny Appes Ekanga	Cameroon	12.12	
31	3	Huang Yanli	China	12.15	
32	2	Émilie Gaydu	France	42.55	

=== Semifinals ===
Official Semifinals Video

Qualification: First four of each semifinal qualified directly (Q) for the final.

Wind:
Heat 1: +0.5 m/s, Heat 2: -0.5 m/s

Rank	Heat	Name	Nationality	Time	Notes
1	1	Carrie Russell	Jamaica	11.05	Q, PB
2	2	Hrystyna Stuy	Ukraine	11.46	Q
3	1	Yevgeniya Polyakova	Russia	11.47	Q
3	2	Shayla Mahan	United States	11.47	Q
5	1	Rosângela Santos	Brazil	11.49	Q
6	2	Lina Grinčikaitė	Lithuania	11.52	Q
7	1	Nataliya Pohrebnyak	Ukraine	11.53	Q
8	1	Amy Foster	Ireland	11.60	
9	2	Andreea Ograzeanu	Romania	11.61	Q
10	1	Shakera Reece	Barbados	11.65	
11	2	Ashleigh Nelson	Great Britain	11.66	
12	2	Sonia Tavares	Portugal	11.71	
13	2	Yulia Kashina	Russia	11.75	
14	1	Lakya Brookins	United States	11.76	
15	1	Amparo Cotán	Spain	11.77	
16	2	Maryam Tousi	Iran	11.98	

=== Final ===
Official Video

Wind: -0.7 m/s

Rank	Lane	Name	Nationality	Time	Notes
1st place, gold medalist(s)	4	Carrie Russell	Jamaica	11.05	=PB
2nd place, silver medalist(s)	7	Hrystyna Stuy	Ukraine	11.34	SB
3rd place, bronze medalist(s)	9	Lina Grinčikaitė	Lithuania	11.44	
4	5	Shayla Mahan	United States	11.45	
5	8	Rosângela Santos	Brazil	11.48	
6	3	Andreea Ograzeanu	Romania	11.49	
7	2	Nataliya Pohrebnyak	Ukraine	11.50	
8	6	Yevgeniya Polyakova	Russia	11.51	
