= Athletics at the 2012 Summer Olympics – Women's 4 × 100 metres relay =

Women's 4 × 100 metres relay at the Games of the XXX Olympiad
- Venue: Olympic Stadium
- Date: 9 August 2012 (heats); 10 August 2012 (final)
- Teams: 16
- Winning time: 40.82 WR

Medalists
1st place, gold medalist(s)		United States: Tianna Madison; Allyson Felix; Bianca Knight; Carmelita Jeter; Jeneba Tarmoh*; Lauryn Williams*
2nd place, silver medalist(s)		Jamaica: Shelly-Ann Fraser-Pryce; Sherone Simpson; Veronica Campbell-Brown; Kerron Stewart; Samantha Henry-Robinson*; Schillonie Calvert*
3rd place, bronze medalist(s)		Ukraine: Olesya Povh; Hrystyna Stuy; Mariya Ryemyen; Elyzaveta Bryzgina

Official Video

The women's 4 × 100 metres relay competition at the 2012 Olympic Games in London took place on 9–10 August at the Olympic Stadium. The victorious United States team broke the world record by over half a second. The previous record had been set 27 years previously by East Germany. The Jamaican team, 6 metres back, missed the previous world record by 0.04, but set a new national record. Another 7 metres back, Ukraine took the bronze, also setting a new national record.

== Records ==
Prior to the competition, the existing World and Olympic records were as follows.

World record	East Germany (Silke Gladisch, Sabine Rieger, Ingrid Auerswald, Marlies Göhr)	41.37	Canberra, Australia	6 October 1985
Olympic record	East Germany (Romy Müller, Bärbel Wöckel, Ingrid Auerswald, Marlies Göhr)	41.60	Moscow, Soviet Union	1 August 1980
2012 World leading	United States (Tianna Madison, Allyson Felix, Bianca Knight, Carmelita Jeter)	42.19	Philadelphia, United States	28 April 2012

The following records were established during the competition:

Date	Event	Name	Nationality	Time	Record
10 August 2012	Final	Tianna Madison, Allyson Felix, Bianca Knight, Carmelita Jeter	United States	40.82	WR
10 August 2012	Final	Shelly-Ann Fraser-Pryce, Sherone Simpson, Veronica Campbell-Brown, Kerron Stewart	Jamaica	41.41	NR
10 August 2012	Final	Olesya Povh, Hrystyna Stuy, Mariya Ryemyen, Elyzaveta Bryzgina	Ukraine	42.04	NR
9 August 2012	Round 1	Michelle-Lee Ahye, Kelly-Ann Baptiste, Kai Selvon, Semoy Hackett	Trinidad and Tobago	42.31	NR
9 August 2012	Round 1	Kadene Vassell, Dafne Schippers, Eva Lubbers, Jamile Samuel	Netherlands	42.45	NR
9 August 2012	Round 1	Ana Claudia Silva, Franciela Krasucki, Evelyn dos Santos, Rosângela Santos	Brazil	42.55	AR

== Results ==
=== Round 1 ===
Qual. rule: first 3 of each heat (Q) plus the 2 fastest times (q) qualified.

==== Heat 1 ====
Rank	Lane	Nation	Competitors	Time	Notes
1	2	United States	Tianna Madison, Jeneba Tarmoh, Bianca Knight, Lauryn Williams	41.64	Q, SB
2	4	Trinidad and Tobago	Michelle-Lee Ahye, Kelly-Ann Baptiste, Kai Selvon, Semoy Hackett	42.31	Q, NR
3	8	Netherlands	Kadene Vassell, Dafne Schippers, Eva Lubbers, Jamile Samuel	42.45	Q, NR
4	7	Brazil	Ana Claudia Silva, Franciela Krasucki, Evelyn dos Santos, Rosângela Santos	42.55	q, AR
5	3	Nigeria	Christy Udoh, Gloria Asumnu, Oludamola Osayomi, Blessing Okagbare	42.74	q, SB
6	9	Bahamas	Sheniqua Ferguson, Chandra Sturrup, Christine Amertil, Anthonique Strachan	43.07	SB
7	6	Switzerland	Michelle Cueni, Mujinga Kambundji, Ellen Sprunger, Léa Sprunger	43.54	PB
8	5	Japan	Anna Doi, Kana Ichikawa, Chisato Fukushima, Yumeka Sano	44.25	

==== Heat 2 ====
Rank	Lane	Nation	Competitors	Time	Notes
1	4	Ukraine	Olesya Povh, Hrystyna Stuy, Mariya Ryemyen, Elyzaveta Bryzgina	42.36	Q, SB
2	6	Jamaica	Samantha Henry-Robinson, Sherone Simpson, Schillonie Calvert, Kerron Stewart	42.37	Q, SB
3	9	Germany	Leena Günther, Anne Cibis, Tatjana Pinto, Verena Sailer	42.69	Q
4	2	Poland	Marika Popowicz, Daria Korczynska, Marta Jeschke, Ewelina Ptak	43.07	
5	5	Colombia	Yomara Hinestroza, Norma González, Darlenis Obregón, Eliecith Palacios	43.21	SB
6	7	Russia	Olga Belkina, Natalia Rusakova, Elizabeta Savlinis, Aleksandra Fedoriva	43.24	SB
7	3	Belarus	Alina Talay, Katsiaryna Hanchar, Elena Danilyuk-Nevmerzhytskaya, Yuliya Balykina	43.90	
—N/a	8	France	Myriam Soumaré, Ayodelé Ikuesan, Lina Jacques-Sébastien, Johanna Danois	DQ	R 163.3a

- France originally finished in seventh place with a time of 43.77, but were disqualified due to a lane infringement.

=== Final ===
At the 2008 Summer Olympics in Beijing, both the men's and women's 4 × 100 metres teams had dropped the baton, leading one reporter to call it the "nadir in US relay history".

On the first leg of the final, Tianna Madison was almost equal with 100-metre gold medalist Shelly-Ann Fraser-Pryce of Jamaica. Allyson Felix put the USA into a clear lead, extended to 3 metres by Bianca Knight around the turn. 100-metre silver medalist Carmelita Jeter held on to finish comfortably in front of Jamaica co.

Rank	Lane	Nation	Competitors	Time	Notes
1st place, gold medalist(s)	7	United States	Tianna Madison, Allyson Felix, Bianca Knight, Carmelita Jeter	40.82	WR
2nd place, silver medalist(s)	6	Jamaica	Shelly-Ann Fraser-Pryce, Sherone Simpson, Veronica Campbell-Brown, Kerron Stewart	41.41	NR
3rd place, bronze medalist(s)	5	Ukraine	Olesya Povh, Hrystyna Stuy, Mariya Ryemyen, Elyzaveta Bryzgina	42.04	NR
4	2	Nigeria	Oludamola Osayomi, Gloria Asumnu, Endurance Abinuwa, Blessing Okagbare	42.64	SB
5	8	Germany	Leena Günther, Anne Cibis, Tatjana Pinto, Verena Sailer	42.67	
6	9	Netherlands	Kadene Vassell, Dafne Schippers, Eva Lubbers, Jamile Samuel	42.70	
7	3	Brazil	Ana Claudia Silva, Franciela Krasucki, Evelyn dos Santos, Rosângela Santos	42.91	
—N/a	4	Trinidad and Tobago	Michelle-Lee Ahye, Kelly-Ann Baptiste, Kai Selvon, Semoy Hackett	—N/a	DNF
