= 2013 European Athletics Team Championships =

Sporting event in Europe

- Host city: (United Kingdom) Gateshead (SL); (Republic of Ireland) Dublin (1st); (Lithuania) Kaunas (2nd); (Slovakia) Banská Bystrica (3rd)
- Nations: 47 (12 per League) (Note: One country forfait included,)
- Events: 40 (20 men, 20 women)
- Dates: 22–23 June 2013
- Main venue: Gateshead International Stadium (Super League)

The 2013 European Athletics Team Championships was the 4th edition of European Athletics Team Championships, first named European Athletics Team Championships and not only European Team Championships as from the 1st edition (Leiria 2009) to the 3rd edition (Stockholm 2011), took place on 22 and 23 June 2013.

== Calendar ==
Division	Date	Host city	Host country
Super League	22–23 June 2013	Gateshead	Great Britain
First League	22–23 June 2013	Dublin	Ireland
Second League	22–23 June 2013	Kaunas	Lithuania
Third League	22–23 June 2013	Banská Bystrica	Slovakia

== Super League ==
Place: Gateshead International Stadium, Gateshead, Great Britain

=== Participating countries ===
- Belarus
- France
- Germany
- Great Britain
- Greece
- Italy
- Norway
- Poland
- Russia
- Spain
- Turkey
- Ukraine

=== Men's events ===
Event	Gold		Silver		Bronze	
100 m	Jimmy Vicaut; France	10.28	Jaysuma Saidy Ndure; Norway	10.37	Kamil Kryński; Poland	10.40 SB
200 m	Christophe Lemaitre; France	20.27	Jaysuma Saidy Ndure; Norway	20.47	Serhiy Smelyk; Ukraine	20.62 PB
400 m	Vladimir Krasnov; Russia	45.69 SB	Nigel Levine; Great Britain	45.88	David Gollnow; Germany	45.90
800 m	Adam Kszczot; Poland	1:47.27	İlham Tanui Özbilen; Turkey	1:47.39	Andrew Osagie; Great Britain	1:47.41
1500 m	İlham Tanui Özbilen; Turkey	3:38.57	Charlie Grice; Great Britain	3:39.76	Marcin Lewandowski; Poland	3:39.82
3000 m	Bouabdellah Tahri; France	8:05.31	Halil Akkas; Turkey	8:05.50	Valentin Smirnov; Russia	8:05.77
5000 m	Mo Farah; Great Britain	14:10.00	Bouabdellah Tahri; France	14:12.91	Kemal Koyuncu; Turkey	14:14.18
3000 m steeplechase	Tarık Langat Akdağ; Turkey	8:36.25	Abdelaziz Merzougui; Spain	8:37.22	Yoann Kowal; France	8:38.76
110 m hurdles	Sergey Shubenkov; Russia	13.19	Pascal Martinot-Lagarde; France	13.28	Artur Noga; Poland	13.33
400 m hurdles	Silvio Schirrmeister; Germany	49.15 PB	Dai Greene; Great Britain	49.39	Mickaël François; France	49.79
4 × 100 m	Adam Gemili; Harry Aikines-Aryeetey; James Ellington; James Dasaolu; Great Britain	38.39 EL	Roy Schmidt; Sven Knipphals; Julian Reus; Martin Keller; Germany	38.69	Artur Zaczek; Grzegorz Zimniewicz; Karol Zalewski; Kamil Krynski; Poland	38.71
4 × 400 m	Michael Bingham; Conrad Williams; Rhys Williams; Richard Buck; Great Britain	3:05.37 EL	Aleksey Kenig; Radel Kashefrazov; Dmitry Buryak; Vladimir Krasnov; Russia	3:06.09	Marcin Marciniszyn; Rafał Omelko; Michał Pietrzak; Kacper Kozłowski; Poland	3:06.18
High jump	Bohdan Bondarenko; Ukraine	2.28	Mickaël Hanany; France	2.28	Tom Parsons; Great Britain	2.24
Pole vault	Renaud Lavillenie; France	5.77	Giuseppe Gibilisco; Italy	5.60 =SB	Björn Otto; Germany	5.50
Long jump	Aleksandr Menkov; Russia	8.36	Loúis Tsátoumas; Greece	8.12 =SB	Greg Rutherford; Great Britain	8.02
Triple jump	Aleksey Fyodorov; Russia	16.70	Teddy Tamgho; France	16.62	Nathan Douglas; Great Britain	16.45
Shot put	David Storl; Germany	20.47	Tomasz Majewski; Poland	20.29	Aleksandr Lesnoy; Russia	20.27
Discus	Robert Harting; Germany	64.25	Mario Pestano; Spain	61.34	Ercüment Olgundeniz; Turkey	61.32
Hammer	Paweł Fajdek; Poland	77.00	Markus Esser; Germany	76.32	Quentin Bigot; France	75.22
Javelin	Dmitry Tarabin; Russia	85.99 PB	Thomas Röhler; Germany	83.31	Roman Avramenko; Ukraine	81.74
WR world record | AR area record | CR championship record | GR games record | NR national record | OR Olympic record | PB personal best | SB season best | WL world leading (in a given season)

=== Women's events ===
Event	Gold		Silver		Bronze	
100 m	Olesya Povh; Ukraine	11.51	Myriam Soumaré; France	11.66	Tatjana Pinto; Germany	11.72
200 m	Mariya Ryemyen; Ukraine	22.80	Myriam Soumaré; France	23.05	Anyika Onuora; Great Britain	23.12
400 m	Perri Shakes-Drayton; Great Britain	50.50 EL	Kseniya Zadorina; Russia	51.07	Marie Gayot; France	51.54 PB
800 m	Jessica Judd; Great Britain	2:00.82	Olha Lyakhova; Ukraine	2:02.30	Marina Arzamasova; Belarus	2:02.45
1500 m	Isabel Macías; Spain	4:09.95 SB	Renata Pliś; Poland	4:10.73	Margherita Magnani; Italy	4:11.01
3000 m	Elena Korobkina; Russia	9:01.45	Laura Weightman; Great Britain	9:03.11	Iris Fuentes-Pila; Spain	9:03.20 PB
5000 m	Olga Golovkina; Russia	15:32.45 SB	Emelia Gorecka; Great Britain	15:40.52	Sabrina Mockenhaupt; Germany	15:40.94
3000 m steeplechase	Natalia Aristarkhova; Russia	9:30.64 EL	Valentyna Zhudina; Ukraine	9:34.90	Antje Möldner-Schmidt; Germany	9:35.67 SB
110 m hurdles	Tiffany Porter; Great Britain	12.62	Tatyana Dektyareva; Russia	12.88	Hanna Platitsyna; Ukraine	12.91
400 m hurdles	Eilidh Child; Great Britain	54.42 PB	Hanna Yaroshchuk; Ukraine	55.27	Vera Rudakova; Russia	56.20
4 × 100 m	Olesya Povh; Viktoriya Pyatachenko; Mariya Ryemyen; Nataliya Pohrebnyak; Ukraine	42.62 EL	Yasmin Kwadwo; Inna Weit; Tatjana Pinto; Verena Sailer; Germany	43.15	Yulia Katsura; Yulia Kashina; Elizaveta Savlinis; Ekaterina Kuzina; Russia	43.23
4 × 400 m	Eilidh Child; Shana Cox; Meghan Beesley; Christine Ohuruogu; Great Britain	3:28.60	Ksenia Gusarova; Yuliya Terekhova; Tatyana Firova; Ksenia Zadorina; Russia	3:29.46	Marie Gayot; Lénora Guion-Firmin; Phara Anacharsis; Floria Gueï; France	3:29.55
High jump	Mariya Kuchina; Russia	1.98 PB	Alessia Trost; Italy; Kamila Stepaniuk; Poland	1.92		
Pole vault	Silke Spiegelburg; Germany	4.60	Anzhelika Sidorova; Russia	4.55 PB	Anna Rogowska; Poland	4.40
Long jump	Éloyse Lesueur; France	6.44	Darya Klishina; Russia	6.43	Shara Proctor; Great Britain	6.43
Triple jump	Olha Saladuha; Ukraine	14.49	Ekaterina Koneva; Russia	14.10	Simona La Mantia; Italy	13.99
Shot put	Christina Schwanitz; Germany	19.30	Halyna Obleshchuk; Ukraine	18.05	Emel Dereli; Turkey	17.50
Discus	Mélina Robert-Michon; France	63.75 SB	Julia Fischer; Germany	62.67	Żaneta Glanc; Poland	61.70
Hammer	Betty Heidler; Germany	74.31	Anita Włodarczyk; Poland	74.14	Sophie Hitchon; Great Britain	72.97 NR
Javelin	Christina Obergföll; Germany	62.64	Mercedes Chilla; Spain	58.55	Vira Rebryk; Ukraine	57.92
WR world record | AR area record | CR championship record | GR games record | NR national record | OR Olympic record | PB personal best | SB season best | WL world leading (in a given season)

=== Score table ===
Event		BLR	FRA	GER	GBR	GRE	ITA	NOR	POL	RUS	ESP	TUR	UKR
100 metres	M	1	12	9	7	3	6	11	10	8	4	5	2
100 metres	W	5	11	10	8	1	2	6	7	9	3	4	12
200 metres	M	4	12	5	9	6	8	11	0	3	7	2	10
200 metres	W	3	11	6	10	0	9	2	7.5	5	7.5	4	12
400 metres	M	0	3	10	11	6	8	2	9	12	4.5	7	4.5
400 metres	W	4	10	5	12	1	9	3	6	11	8	2	7
800 metres	M	6	9	7	10	2	8	3	12	1	5	11	4
800 metres	W	10	8	6	12	3	7	5	9	0	2	4	11
1500 metres	M	1	4	9	11	5	3	2	10	7	8	12	6
1500 metres	W	0	5	7	9	4	10	3	11	0	12	6	8
3000 metres	M	3	12	8	6	1	4	2	7	10	5	11	9
3000 metres	W	2	6	9	11	3	7	1	8	12	10	5	4
5000 metres	M	3	11	7	12	1	6	2	8	4	5	10	9
5000 metres	W	1	7	10	11	2	8	5	6	12	9	4	3
3000 metre steeplechase	M	4	10	8	2	1	6	3	5	9	11	12	7
3000 metre steeplechase	W	6	5	10	8	4	3	1	2	12	9	7	11
110/100 metre hurdles	M	5	11	6	8	9	7	3	10	12	4	1	2
110/100 metre hurdles	W	8	0	7	12	4	9	6	3	11	5	2	10
400 metre hurdles	M	2	10	12	11	4	8	9	7	5	6	1	3
400 metre hurdles	W	2	8	6	12	3	9	4	7	10	5	0	11
4 × 100 metres relay	M	0	9	11	12	3	8	0	10	6	5	4	7
4 × 100 metres relay	W	5	9	11	8	2	6	1	7	10	4	3	12
4 × 400 metres relay	M	1	8	9	12	4	7	2	10	11	6	3	5
4 × 400 metres relay	W	6	10	7	12	0	5	0	8	11	4	0	9
High jump	M	3.5	11	8	10	5	9	2	6	7	3.5	1	12
High jump	W	3	2	7.5	4	6	10.5	5	10.5	12	9	7.5	1
Pole vault	M	0	12	10	4	7	11	3	9	5.5	5.5	0	8
Pole vault	W	0	8.5	12	0	0	7	4	10	11	8.5	5	6
Long jump	M	1	6	9	10	11	3	4	5	12	8	2	7
Long jump	W	1	12	8	10	9	7	4	6	11	5	2	3
Triple jump	M	4	11	2	10	9	7	1	6	12	5	3	8
Triple jump	W	5	4	8	9	7	10	1	6	11	3	2	12
Shot put	M	7	5	12	4	6	2	1	11	10	9	8	3
Shot put	W	7	5	12	6	2	9	1	3	4	8	10	11
Discus throw	M	5	1	12	8	3	6	7	9	2	11	10	4
Discus throw	W	6	12	11	7	3	4	2	10	8	5	1	9
Hammer throw	M	8	10	11	3	2	7	6	12	9	5	0	4
Hammer throw	W	9	0	12	10	4	6	3	11	5	7	2	8
Javelin throw	M	7	1	11	5	6	2	9	8	12	4	3	10
Javelin throw	W	7	5	12	4	6	1	3	8	9	11	2	10
Country		BLR	FRA	GER	GBR	GRE	ITA	NOR	POL	RUS	ESP	TUR	UKR
Total		150	306.5	351.5	333	155	260	141	311	324.5	250	197.5	291.5

== Final standings ==
Pos	Country	Pts
1	Germany	351.5
2	Great Britain	341
3	Russia	320.5
4	Poland	310.5
5	France	306.5
6	Ukraine	296.5
7	Italy	266.5
8	Spain	259
9	Turkey	181.5
10	Greece	162
11	Norway	147
12	Belarus	141.5

Note: The competition was originally won by Russia but after the doping disqualification of Yekaterina Sharmina and points being reallocated, it was overtaken by Germany and Great Britain.

== First League ==
Place: Morton Stadium, Dublin, Ireland

=== Participating countries ===
Belgium
Bulgaria
Czech Republic
Estonia
Finland
Hungary

Ireland
Netherlands
Portugal
Romania
Sweden
Switzerland

=== Men's events ===
Event	Gold		Silver		Bronze	
100 m	Churandy Martina; Netherlands	10.46	Denis Dimitrov; Bulgaria	10.76	Jason Smyth; Ireland	10.78
200 m	Pavel Maslák; Czech Republic	21.20	Jonathan Borlée; Belgium	21.31	Nil de Oliveira; Sweden	21.31
400 m	Brian Gregan; Ireland	46.32	Seppe Thijs; Belgium	47.06	Axel Bergrahm; Sweden	47.52
800 m	Tamás Kazi; Hungary	1:50.96	Johan Rogestedt; Sweden	1:51.57	Tuomo Salonen; Finland	1:51.64
1500 m	Pieter-Jan Hannes; Belgium	3:45.05	Ioan Zaizan; Romania	3:46.33	Hélio Gomes; Portugal	3:46.96
3000 m	Niclas Sandells; Finland	8:17.78	Richard Douma; Netherlands	8:18.72	Tiidrek Nurme; Estonia	8:19.14
5000 m	Bashir Abdi; Belgium	14:52.78	Tiidrek Nurme; Estonia	14:53.53	Nicolae Alexandru Soare; Romania	14:55.92
3000 m steeplechase	Mitko Tsenov; Bulgaria	8:45.12	Alberto Paulo; Portugal	8:53.83	Alexandru Ghinea; Romania	8:54.65
110 m hurdles	Balázs Baji; Hungary	13.45	Gregory Sedoc; Netherlands	13.50	Ben Reynolds; Ireland	13.71
400 m hurdles	Rasmus Mägi; Estonia	51.07	Niclas Åkerström; Sweden	51.42	Tibor Koroknai; Hungary	51.48
4 × 100 m	Brian Mariano; Churandy Martina; Jerrel Ferrer; Hensley Paulina; Netherlands	39.14	Alexander Brorsson; Nil de Oliveira; Johan Wissman; Stefan Tärnhuvud; Sweden	39.55	Diogo Antunes; David Lima; Arnaldo Abrantes; Ricardo Monteiro; Portugal	39.89
4 × 400 m	Jason Harvey; Dara Kervick; Richard Morissey; Brian Gregan; Ireland	3:08.12	Seppe Thijs; Antoine Gillet; Arnout Matthys; Jonathan Borlée; Belgium	3:10.25	Jürgen Wielart; Dennis Spillekom; Jesper Arts; Lee-Marvin Bonevacia; Netherlands	3:10.46
High jump	Jaroslav Bába; Czech Republic	2.20	Mihai Donisan; Romania	2.20	Jussi Viita; Finland	2.15
Pole vault	Jan Kudlička; Czech Republic	5.50	Alhaji Jeng; Sweden; Edi Maia; Portugal	5.40		
Long jump	Eero Haapala; Finland	7.96	Michel Tornéus; Sweden	7.95	Denis Eradiri; Bulgaria	7.85
Triple jump	Fabian Florant; Netherlands	16.49	Zlatozar Atanasov; Bulgaria	16.15	Alexander Hochuli; Switzerland	15.98
Shot put	Ladislav Prášil; Czech Republic	20.62	Georgi Ivanov; Bulgaria	20.53	Marco Fortes; Portugal	20.04
Discus	Sergiu Ursu; Romania	63.02	Gerd Kanter; Estonia	61.56	Jouni Waldén; Finland	59.59
Hammer	Krisztián Pars; Hungary	76.56	Lukáš Melich; Czech Republic	75.02	Tuomas Seppänen; Finland	68.81
Javelin	Vítězslav Veselý; Czech Republic	80.44	Kim Amb; Sweden	79.44	Risto Mätas; Estonia	76.49
WR world record | AR area record | CR championship record | GR games record | NR national record | OR Olympic record | PB personal best | SB season best | WL world leading (in a given season)

=== Women's events ===
Event	Gold		Silver		Bronze	
100 m	Ivet Lalova; Bulgaria	11.79	Kateřina Čechová; Czech Republic	11.85	Irene Ekelund; Sweden	11.95
200 m	Angela Moroșanu; Romania	23.48	Ivet Lalova; Bulgaria	23.85	Moa Hjelmer; Sweden	23.88
400 m	Zuzana Hejnová; Czech Republic	51.90	Adelina Pastor; Romania	52.64	Moa Hjelmer; Sweden	52.89
800 m	Mirela Lavric; Romania	2:03.44	Lenka Masná; Czech Republic	2:03.53	Selina Büchel; Switzerland	2:03.80
1500 m	Maureen Koster; Netherlands	4:22.66	Tereza Capková; Czech Republic	4:23.15	Ioana Doaga; Romania	4:25.12
3000 m	Susan Kuijken; Netherlands	9:07.04	Almensh Belete; Belgium	9:11.61	Charlotta Fougberg; Sweden	9:17.83
5000 m	Jip Vastenburg; Netherlands	16:12.88	Roxana Bârca; Romania	16:13.22	Dulce Félix; Portugal	16:15.36
3000 m steeplechase	Sandra Eriksson; Finland	9:47.76	Silvia Danekova; Bulgaria	9:47.96	Helen Hofstede; Netherlands	9:52.82
100 m hurdles	Rosina Hodde; Netherlands	13.19	Lucie Škrobáková; Czech Republic	13.24	Anne Zagré; Belgium	13.33
400 m hurdles	Denisa Rosolová; Czech Republic	55.34	Angela Moroșanu; Romania	56.67	Jessie Barr; Ireland	57.50
4 × 100 m	Czech Republic	44.20	Switzerland	44.24	Ireland	44.82
4 × 400 m	Romania	3:30.77	Czech Republic	3:36.95	Ireland	3:38.43
High jump	Nafissatou Thiam; Belgium	1.89	Emma Green Tregaro; Sweden	1.89	Barbara Szabó; Hungary	1.85
Pole vault	Jiřina Svobodová; Czech Republic	4.40	Tori Pena; Ireland	4.30	Minna Nikkanen; Finland	4.30
Long jump	Grit Sadeiko; Estonia	6.26	Erica Jarder; Sweden	6.22	Cornelia Deiac; Romania	6.12
Triple jump	Gabriela Petrova; Bulgaria	13.55	Elina Torro; Finland	13.45	Susana Costa; Portugal	13.37
Shot put	Radoslava Mavrodieva; Bulgaria	18.36	Anca Heltne; Romania	17.51	Anita Márton; Hungary	17.37
Discus	Nicoleta Grasu; Romania	57.34	Anita Márton; Hungary	56.43	Sofia Larsson; Sweden	55.96
Hammer	Éva Orbán; Hungary	68.57	Bianca Perie; Romania	67.51	Tereza Králová; Czech Republic	65.88
Javelin	Oona Sormunen; Finland	56.04	Eliza Toader; Romania	55.89	Sílvia Cruz; Portugal	53.11
WR world record | AR area record | CR championship record | GR games record | NR national record | OR Olympic record | PB personal best | SB season best | WL world leading (in a given season)

=== Score table ===
Event		BEL	BUL	CZE	EST	FIN	HUN	IRL	NED	POR	ROU	SWE	SUI
100 metres	M	2	11	9	4	5	1	10	12	7	3	8	6
100 metres	W	2	12	11	1	7	3	8	6	5	9	10	4
200 metres	M	11	9	12	2	4	3	5	7	8	1	10	6
200 metres	W	6	11	8	1	9	2	4	5	3	12	10	7
400 metres	M	11	2	6	3	5	7	12	9	0	4	10	8
400 metres	W	1	2	12	9	3	5	6	8	7	11	10	4
800 metres	M	6	1	9	3	10	12	2	8	4	5	11	7
800 metres	W	1	6	11	5	3	2	8	9	4	12	7	10
1500 metres	M	12	3	9	2	5	4	7	6	10	11	8	1
1500 metres	W	5	1	11	6	2	4	7	12	3	10	9	8
3000 metres	M	7	4	2	10	12	3	9	11	5	1	8	6
3000 metres	W	11	3	7	1	5	6	9	12	8	4	10	2
5000 metres	M	12	2	7	11	3	4	9	8	5	10	6	1
5000 metres	W	3	4	7	1	6	8	5	12	10	11	2	9
3000 metre steeplechase	M	1	12	5	8	3	6	9	2	11	10	4	7
3000 metre steeplechase	W	3	11	5	1	12	2	4	10	9	8	7	6
110/100 metre hurdles	M	6	3	9	1	4	12	10	11	8	2	7	5
110/100 metre hurdles	W	10	2	11	0	9	3	7	12	8	6	4	5
400 metre hurdles	M	7	1	9	12	2	10	8	6	4	3	11	5
400 metre hurdles	W	9	4	12	2	6	3	10	7	5	11	0	8
4 × 100 metres relay	M	6	2	9	8	4	3	0	12	10	7	11	5
4 × 100 metres relay	W	5	3	12	4	0	7	10	0	9	6	8	11
4 × 400 metres relay	M	11	2	9	4	1	6	12	10	3	7	8	5
4 × 400 metres relay	W	8	4	11	5	2	1	10	9	7	12	6	3
High jump	M	8.5	5	12	6	10	7	3	8.5	1	11	3	3
High jump	W	12	9	4.5	8	6.5	10	1	6.5	3	4.5	11	2
Pole vault	M	6	0	12	5	8	4	9	7	10.5	0	10.5	3
Pole vault	W	6	2	12	9	10	5	11	0	7.5	3	7.5	4
Long jump	M	5	10	7	1	12	3	2	4	9	8	11	6
Long jump	W	4	2	8	12	7	3	5	1	9	10	11	6
Triple jump	M	2	11	3	6	7	4	1	12	9	8	5	10
Triple jump	W	1	12	7	6	11	5	2	4	10	9	8	3
Shot put	M	3	11	12	6	4	8	2	7	10	5	9	1
Shot put	W	7	12	8	6	3	10	5	9	1	11	4	2
Discus throw	M	6	2	5	11	10	9	1	8	4	12	7	3
Discus throw	W	4	3	7	6	2	11	8	5	9	12	10	1
Hammer throw	M	2	4	11	7	10	12	3	8	9	5	0	6
Hammer throw	W	7	2	10	4	8	12	0	3	6	11	9	5
Javelin throw	M	6	3	12	10	9	4	2	7	8	1	11	5
Javelin throw	W	1	3	8	4	12	2	6	5	10	11	9	7
Country		BEL	BUL	CZE	EST	FIN	HUN	IRL	NED	POR	ROU	SWE	SUI
Total		236.5	206	351.5	211	251.5	226	242	299	269	297.5	311	206

=== Final standings ===
Pos	Country	Pts	Note
1	Czech Republic	351.5	Promoted to 2014 Super League
2	Sweden	311	Promoted to 2014 Super League
3	Netherlands	299	Promoted to 2014 Super League
4	Romania	297.5	
5	Portugal	269	
6	Finland	251.5	
7	Ireland	242	
8	Belgium	236.5	
9	Hungary	226	
10	Estonia	211	
11	Bulgaria	206	Relegated to 2014 Second League
12	Switzerland	206	Relegated to 2014 Second League

== Second League ==
Place: Darius and Girėnas Stadium, Kaunas, Lithuania.

=== Participating countries ===
Austria
Croatia
Cyprus
Denmark

Israel
Lithuania
Serbia
Slovenia

=== Men's events ===
Event	Gold		Silver		Bronze	
100 m	Rytis Sakalauskas; Lithuania	10.44 SB	Dario Horvat; Croatia	10.53	Jan Žumer; Slovenia	10.58
200 m	Jan Žumer; Slovenia	21.22	Nick Ekelund-Arenander; Denmark	21.25 PB	Egidijus Dilys; Lithuania	21.27 SB
400 m	Nick Ekelund-Arenander; Denmark	45.93 PB	Donald Sanford; Israel	46.56 SB	Miloš Raović; Serbia	47.07
800 m	Nick Jensen; Denmark	1:52.40	Nemanja Kojić; Serbia	1:52.63	Andreas Rapatz; Austria	1:52.73
1500 m	Andreas Vojta; Austria	3:50.53	Andreas Bueno; Denmark	3:50.78	Yimer Getahun; Israel	3:50.84
3000 m	Mirko Petrović; Serbia	8:27.75	Lukas Pallitsch; Austria	8:28.07	Amine Khadiri; Cyprus	8:28.84
5000 m	Brenton Rowe; Austria	14:09.30	Tasama Moogas; Israel	14:19.39	Jasmin Ljajic; Serbia	14:50.65
3000 m steeplechase	Otto Hesselbjerg; Denmark	8:44.55	Justinas Beržanskis; Lithuania	8:45.36	Blaž Grad; Slovenia	8:47.75
110 m hurdles	Milan Trajkovic; Cyprus	13.67 NR	Andreas Martinsen; Denmark	13.68 NR	Milan Ristić; Serbia	13.93
400 m hurdles	Emir Bekrić; Serbia	49.98	Thomas Kain; Austria	51.80	Christian Laugesen; Denmark	52.00 SB
4 × 100 m	Egidijus Dylis; Rytis Sakalauskas; Kostas Skrabulis; Lukas Gaudutis; Lithuania	39.83	Manuel Prazak; Markus Fuchs; Benjamin Grill; Ekemini Bassey; Austria	40.45	Luka Žontar; Gregor Kokalovič; Blaž Brulc; Jan Žumer; Slovenia	40.65
4 × 400 m	Ivan Marković; Miloš Raović; Dino Dodig; Emir Bekrić; Serbia	3:08.73	Amit Cohen; Donald Sanford; Hai Cohen; Maor Szeged; Israel	3:09.93	Christian Laugesen; Christian Clausen; Nicklas Hyde; Nick Ekelund-Arenander; Denmark	3:10.60
High jump	Raivydas Stanys; Lithuania	2.21	Rožle Prezelj; Slovenia	2.18	Dmitriy Kroyter; Israel	2.18 SB
Pole vault	Rasmus Jørgensen; Denmark	5.65 PB	Ivan Horvat; Croatia	5.40	Nikandros Stylianou; Cyprus	5.40
Long jump	Marius Rudys; Lithuania	7.74 SB	Morten Jensen; Denmark	7.74 SB	Marko Prugovečki; Croatia	7.65
Triple jump	Yochai Halevi; Israel	16.73	Peder P. Nielsen; Denmark	16.06	Panayiotis Volou; Cyprus	16.06 PB
Shot put	Asmir Kolašinac; Serbia	20.37	Marin Premeru; Croatia	19.56	Šarūnas Banevičius; Lithuania	19.21
Discus	Apostolos Parellis; Cyprus	60.17	Gerhard Mayer; Austria	59.58	Marin Premeru; Croatia	58.83
Hammer	Primož Kozmus; Slovenia	72.92	Konstadinos Stathelakos; Cyprus	68.80 SB	Andras Haklits; Croatia	68.16
Javelin	Matija Kranjc; Slovenia	73.36	Vedran Samac; Serbia	71.80	Roko Zemunik; Croatia	67.35
WR world record | AR area record | CR championship record | GR games record | NR national record | OR Olympic record | PB personal best | SB season best | WL world leading (in a given season)

=== Women's events ===
Event	Gold		Silver		Bronze	
100 m	Lina Grinčikaitė; Lithuania	11.31 SB	Eleni Artymata; Cyprus	11.41 SB	Kristina Žumer; Slovenia	11.50 PB
200 m	Eleni Artymata; Cyprus	23.15 SB	Lina Grinčikaitė; Lithuania	23.39 SB	Olga Lenskiy; Israel	23.68
400 m	Agnė Šerkšnienė; Lithuania	52.81	Liona Rebernik; Slovenia	53.63 SB	Anita Banović; Croatia	53.91
800 m	Eglė Balčiūnaitė; Lithuania	2:03.05	Natalia Evangelidou; Cyprus	2:03.83 PB	Amela Terzić; Serbia	2:04.67 PB
1500 m	Amela Terzić; Serbia	4:26.73	Natalija Piliušina; Lithuania	4:26.83	Natalia Evangelidou; Cyprus	4:28.86
3000 m	Sonja Stolić; Serbia	9:27.69	Sonja Roman; Slovenia	9:28.32 SB	Jennifer Wenth; Austria	9:38.53
5000 m	Olivera Jevtić; Serbia	15:59.94	Vaida Žūsinaitė; Lithuania	16:16.42 SB	Lisa Stublić; Croatia	16:19.11 SB
3000 m steeplechase	Maruša Mišmaš; Slovenia	9:58.93 NR	Vaida Žūsinaitė; Lithuania	10:11.82 SB	Simone Glad; Denmark	10:29.47
110 m hurdles	Marina Tomić; Slovenia	13.28	Sonata Tamošaitytė; Lithuania	13.63 SB	Marina Banović; Croatia	13.92 SB
400 m hurdles	Eglė Staišiūnaitė; Lithuania	57.75 SB	Stina Trøst; Denmark	57.95	Verena Menapace; Austria	1:00.16 SB
4 × 100 m	Kaja Debevec; Tina Jureš; Kristina Žumer; Sabina Veit; Slovenia	44.73	Modesta Morauskaitė; Agnė Šerkšnienė; Sonata Tamošaitytė; Lina Grinčikaitė; Lithuania	44.84	Beate Schrott; Doris Röser; Marina Kraushofer; Linda Thoms; Austria	45.18
4 × 400 m	Eva Misiūnaitė; Eglė Balčiūnaitė; Modesta Morauskaitė; Agnė Šerkšnienė; Lithuania	3:35.11	Anja Benko; Eva Trošt; Maja Pogorevc; Liona Rebernik; Slovenia	3:39.57	Romana Tea Kirinić; Marija Hižman; Kristina Dudek; Anita Banović; Croatia	3:39.61
High jump	Ana Šimić; Croatia	1.93	Airinė Palšytė; Lithuania	1.88 SB	Ma'ayan Shahaf; Israel	1.88
Pole vault	Tina Šutej; Slovenia	4.30 SB	Caroline Bonde Holm; Denmark	4.25 SB	Kira Grünberg; Austria	4.15 PB
Long jump	Nektaria Panagi; Cyprus	6.46	Snežana Rodić; Slovenia	6.37	Jogaile Petrokaite; Lithuania	6.16
Triple jump	Snežana Rodić; Slovenia	14.07 SB	Sonja Krnjeta; Croatia	13.46 PB	Asta Daukšaitė; Lithuania	13.02
Shot put	Valentina Mužarić; Croatia	17.29	Austra Skujytė; Lithuania	16.52 SB	Annastasia Muchkaev; Israel	15.90
Discus	Sandra Perković; Croatia	65.77	Zinaida Sendriūtė; Lithuania	63.03	Dragana Tomašević; Serbia	59.88
Hammer	Barbara Špiler; Slovenia	68.22	Paraskevi Theodorou; Cyprus	60.63	Meiken Greve; Denmark	57.44
Javelin	Martina Ratej; Slovenia	62.60 SB	Tatjana Jelača; Serbia	56.88	Sara Kolak; Croatia	56.32 PB
WR world record | AR area record | CR championship record | GR games record | NR national record | OR Olympic record | PB personal best | SB season best | WL world leading (in a given season)

=== Score table ===
Event		AUT	CRO	CYP	DEN	ISR	LTU	SRB	SLO
100 metres	M	3	7	4	1	5	8	2	6
100 metres	W	4	3	7	2	5	8	1	6
200 metres	M	2	5	3	7	1	6	4	8
200 metres	W	2	3	8	1	6	7	4	5
400 metres	M	1	4	3	8	7	2	6	5
400 metres	W	3	6	4	2	1	8	5	7
800 metres	M	6	4	3	8	5	1	7	2
800 metres	W	3	1	7	2	5	8	6	4
1500 metres	M	8	1	4	7	6	2	5	3
1500 metres	W	4	2	6	3	1	7	8	5
3000 metres	M	7	5	6	2	4	1	8	3
3000 metres	W	6	1	2	3	4	5	8	7
5000 metres	M	8	4	1	3	7	2	6	5
5000 metres	W	4	6	1	3	2	7	8	5
3000 metre steeplechase	M	5	2	1	8	4	7	3	6
3000 metre steeplechase	W	3	4	2	6	1	7	5	8
110/100 metre hurdles	M	4	1	8	7	3	2	6	5
110/100 metre hurdles	W	4	6	2	5	1	7	3	8
400 metre hurdles	M	7	3	2	6	5	1	8	4
400 metre hurdles	W	6	2	3	7	1	8	4	5
4 × 100 metres relay	M	7	4	2	3	5	8	1	6
4 × 100 metres relay	W	6	5	0	2	3	7	4	8
4 × 400 metres relay	M	1	3	4	6	7	2	8	5
4 × 400 metres relay	W	4	6	2	1	3	8	5	7
High jump	M	0	4	2.5	2.5	6	8	5	7
High jump	W	4	8	5	1	6	7	2	3
Pole vault	M	5	7	6	8	3	2	1	4
Pole vault	W	6	2.5	2.5	7	4	1	5	8
Long jump	M	2	6	1	7	3	8	4	5
Long jump	W	3	4	8	5	1	6	2	7
Triple jump	M	5	1	6	7	8	2	3	4
Triple jump	W	5	7	2	3	1	6	4	8
Shot put	M	2	7	3	1	4	6	8	5
Shot put	W	1	8	4	5	6	7	3	2
Discus throw	M	7	6	8	2	4	5	3	1
Discus throw	W	1	8	5	4	3	7	6	2
Hammer throw	M	1	6	7	4	3	5	2	8
Hammer throw	W	2	4	7	6	3	1	5	8
Javelin throw	M	4	6	1	3	2	5	7	8
Javelin throw	W	5	6	2	3	1	4	7	8
Country		AUT	CRO	CYP	DEN	ISR	LTU	SRB	SLO
Total		161	178.5	155	171.5	150	209	192	221

=== Final standings ===
Pos	Country	Pts
1	Slovenia	221
2	Lithuania	209
3	Serbia	192
4	Croatia	178.5
5	Denmark	171.5
6	Austria	161
7	Cyprus	155
8	Israel	150

== Third League ==
Place: – SNP Stadium, Banská Bystrica, Slovakia.

=== Participating countries ===
Athletic Association of Small States of Europe
(Gibraltar, Liechtenstein, Monaco, San Marino)
Albania
Andorra
Armenia
Azerbaijan
Bosnia and Herzegovina
Georgia

Iceland
Latvia
Luxembourg
Macedonia
Malta
Moldova
Montenegro
Slovakia

=== Men's events ===
Event	Gold		Silver		Bronze	
100 m	Adam Zavacký; Slovakia	10.52	Riste Pandev; Macedonia	10.75	Vadim Ryabikhin; Azerbaijan	10.76
200 m	Roman Turčáni; Slovakia	21.12	Kolbeinn Höður Gunnarsson; Iceland	21.60	Vadim Ryabikhin; Azerbaijan	21.61
400 m	Jānis Leitis; Latvia	47.36	Hakim Ibrahimov; Azerbaijan	47.59	Amel Tuka; Bosnia and Herzegovina	47.73
800 m	Amel Tuka; Bosnia and Herzegovina	1:51.11	Renārs Stepiņš; Latvia	1:51.37	Tomáš Timoranský; Slovakia	1:51.58
1500 m	Ion Siuris; Moldova	3:49.80	Jozef Pelikán; Slovakia	3:53.14	Ashot Hayrapetyan; Armenia	3:53.33
3000 m	David Karonei; Luxembourg	8:19.34	Roman Prodius; Moldova	8:20.79	Jaroslav Szabó; Slovakia	8:22.93
5000 m	Roman Prodius; Moldova	14:31.51	Jānis Viškers; Latvia	14:35.80	Pol Mellina; Luxembourg	14:44.14
3000 m steeplechase	Vitalie Gheorghiță; Moldova	9:05.43	Pascal Groben; Luxembourg	9:13.19	Osman Junuzović; Bosnia and Herzegovina	9:24.40
110 m hurdles	David Ilariani; Georgia	13.99	Viliam Papšo; Slovakia	14.03	Jānis Jansons; Latvia	14.54
400 m hurdles	Alexei Cravcenco; Moldova	50.82	Martin Kučera; Slovakia	50.95	Jacques Frisch; Luxembourg	51.16
4 × 100 m	Slovakia	40.78	Moldova	41.13	Georgia	42.05
4 × 400 m	Georgia	3:12.38	Latvia	3:12.78	Slovakia	3:13.08
High jump	Zurab Gogochuri; Georgia	2.20	Peter Horák; Slovakia	2.15	Andrei Mîțîcov; Moldova	2.15
Pole vault	Mareks Ārents; Latvia	5.40	Ján Zmoray; Slovakia	5.10	Mark Johnson; Iceland	5.10
Long jump	Elvijs Misāns; Latvia	7.89	Vardan Pahlevanyan; Armenia	7.74	Tomáš Veszelka; Slovakia	7.43
Triple jump	Murad Ibadullayev; Azerbaijan	15.76	Levon Aghasyan; Armenia	15.67	Vladimir Letnicov; Moldova	15.52
Shot put	Bob Bertemes; Luxembourg	18.02	Óðinn Björn Þorsteinsson; Iceland	17.81	Mesud Pezer; Bosnia and Herzegovina	17.58
Discus	Danijel Furtula; Montenegro	56.52	Matej Gašaj; Slovakia	55.43	Oskars Vaisjūns; Latvia	51.70
Hammer	Marcel Lomnický; Slovakia	74.98	Dmitriy Marshin; Azerbaijan	71.48	Igors Sokolovs; Latvia	71.21
Javelin	Rolands Štrobinders; Latvia	79.14	Guðmundur Sverisson; Iceland	76.35	Patrik Žeňúch; Slovakia	72.87
WR world record | AR area record | CR championship record | GR games record | NR national record | OR Olympic record | PB personal best | SB season best | WL world leading (in a given season)

=== Women's events ===
Event	Gold		Silver		Bronze	
100 m	Tiffany Tshilumba; Luxembourg	11.98	Hafdí Sigurdardóttir; Iceland	12.04	Alexandra Bezeková; Slovakia	12.06
200 m	Lenka Kršáková; Slovakia	24.03	Olesea Cojuhari; Moldova	24.12	Gunt Latiševa-Čudare; Latvia	24.45
400 m	Olesea Cojuhari; Moldova	52.65	Gunt Latiševa-Čudare; Latvia	53.71	Hafdí Sigurdardóttir; Iceland	54.03
800 m	Aníta Hinriksdóttir; Iceland	2:01.17	Olga Zaporojan; Moldova	2:07.99	Charline Mathias; Luxembourg	2:08.18
1500 m	Aníta Hinriksdóttir; Iceland	4:16.51	Biljana Cvijanović; Bosnia and Herzegovina	4:24.83	Olga Zaporojan; Moldova	4:33.48
3000 m	Tsehynesh Tsenga; Azerbaijan	9:31.74	Sladjana Perunović; Montenegro	9:33.83	Arndí Hafthorsdóttir; Iceland	10:04.75
5000 m	Tsehynesh Tsenga; Azerbaijan	16:29.29	Sladjana Perunović; Montenegro	16:51.99	Arndí Hafthorsdóttir; Iceland	17:26.11
3000 m steeplechase	Biljana Cvijanović; Bosnia and Herzegovina	10:17.77	Giuli Dekanadze; Georgia	11:14.20	Katarina Pokorná; Slovakia	11:27.89
100 m hurdles	Laura Ikauniece; Latvia	13.63	Gorana Cvijetić; Bosnia and Herzegovina	13.92	Lucia Mokrášová; Slovakia	13.93
400 m hurdles	Lucia Slaníčková; Slovakia	58.62	Armaliya Sharoyan; Armenia	1:00.05	Kim Reuland; Luxembourg	1:00.21
4 × 100 m	Slovakia	46.13	Iceland	46.52	Luxembourg	47.15
4 × 400 m	Slovakia	3:38.95	Iceland	3:39.14	Moldova	3:46.00
High jump	Julija Undīne Dindune; Latvia	1.81	Marija Vuković; Montenegro	1.76	Iveta Srnková; Slovakia	1.73
Pole vault	Slavomíra Sľúková; Slovakia	3.95	Gina Reuland; Luxembourg	3.70	Ilze Bortaščenoka; Latvia	3.70
Long jump	Jana Velďáková; Slovakia	6.41	Rebecca Camilleri; Malta	6.30 NR	Māra Grīva; Latvia	6.12
Triple jump	Dana Velďáková; Slovakia	13.74	Māra Grīva; Latvia	13.07	Tatiana Cicanci; Moldova	13.04
Shot put	Salome Rigishvili; Georgia	15.95	Ivana Krištofičová; Slovakia	14.41	Ásdís Hjálmsdóttir; Iceland	13.65
Discus	Salome Rigishvili; Georgia	52.47	Ivona Tomanová; Slovakia	46.53	Milica Vukadinović; Montenegro	45.01
Hammer	Martina Hrašnová; Slovakia	71.49	Zalina Marghieva; Moldova	71.36	Sandra Pétursdóttir; Iceland	50.62
Javelin	Madara Palameika; Latvia	57.07	Ásdís Hjálmsdóttir; Iceland	53.36	Veronika Ľašová; Slovakia	48.96
WR world record | AR area record | CR championship record | GR games record | NR national record | OR Olympic record | PB personal best | SB season best | WL world leading (in a given season)

=== Score table ===
Event		AAS	ALB	AND	ARM	AZE	BIH	GEO	ISL	LAT	LUX	MKD	MLT	MDA	MNE	SVK
100 metres	M	5	2	4	0	13	9	7	11	10	3	14	8	12	6	15
100 metres	W	8	2	5	10	9	6	3	14	12	15	1	11	7	4	13
200 metres	M	3	0	2	5	13	9	10	14	12	6	8	7	11	4	15
200 metres	W	0	3	4	12	7	8	2	11	13	9	5	10	14	6	15
400 metres	M	2	4	1	12	14	13	11	7	15	5	9	3	8	6	10
400 metres	W	0	9	2	10	8	6	4	13	14	7	3	11	15	5	12
800 metres	M	2	0	4	8	9	15	10	12	14	7	5	3	11	6	13
800 metres	W	0	0	3	5	11	4	10	15	7	13	8	9	14	6	12
1500 metres	M	4	0	2	13	5	9	11	12	7	10	3	8	15	6	14
1500 metres	W	0	0	5	6	3	14	12	15	10	9	4	7	13	8	11
3000 metres	M	0	8	9	10	2	6	7	11	12	15	3	5	14	4	13
3000 metres	W	5	0	3	6	15	12	2	13	10	9	4	8	7	14	11
5000 metres	M	2	0	11	9	4	8	5	12	14	13	6	3	15	7	10
5000 metres	W	0	0	4	6	15	7	8	13	10	9	0	11	5	14	12
3000 metre steeplechase	M	1	4	8	10	12	13	5	9	7	14	3	6	15	2	11
3000 metre steeplechase	W	0	0	0	0	0	15	14	8	11	9	0	10	12	7	13
110/100 metre hurdles	M	6	7.5	4	3	0	9	15	7.5	13	12	5	0	10	11	14
110/100 metre hurdles	W	4	0	3	12	11	14	7	10	15	8	5	0	9	6	13
400 metre hurdles	M	5	4	1	7	11	8	10	9	12	13	2	3	15	6	14
400 metre hurdles	W	0	0	4	14	8	9	6	11	10	13	7	0	12	5	15
4 × 100 metres relay	M	8	0	6	0	0	0	13	5	11	9.5	9.5	12	14	7	15
4 × 100 metres relay	W	4	0	0	9	7	8	6	14	11.5	13	5	11.5	10	0	15
4 × 400 metres relay	M	3	1	2	7	11	8	15	9	14	10	4	6	12	5	13
4 × 400 metres relay	W	0	0	3	10	7	9	5	14	11	12	6	8	13	4	15
High jump	M	8	0	2	5	10	9	15	4	11.5	11.5	7	3	13.5	6	13.5
High jump	W	7.5	0	5	6	7.5	12	3	11	15	9	10	2	4	14	13
Pole vault	M	8	0	12	0	7	0	6	13	15	10	0	5	11	9	14
Pole vault	W	11	0	0	0	10	0	0	9	13.5	13.5	0	0	12	0	15
Long jump	M	7	11	1	14	10	3	9	6	15	5	4	2	12	8	13
Long jump	W	1	5	3	11	7	8	6	12	13	9	2	14	10	4	15
Triple jump	M	0	5	0	14	15	3	11	8	12	9	4	7	13	6	10
Triple jump	W	0	0	3	12	7	10	9	6	14	8	4	11	13	5	15
Shot put	M	2	0	3	8	7	13	4	14	9	15	5	6	10	12	11
Shot put	W	2	0	3	5	4	12	15	13	11	10	7	6	9	8	14
Discus throw	M	0	0	4	8	6	12	7	11	13	10	0	5	9	15	14
Discus throw	W	8	0	2	5	3	11	15	4	12	6	7	9	10	13	14
Hammer throw	M	0	0	6	7	14	8	11	9	13	10	5	3	12	4	15
Hammer throw	W	3	0	8	10	0	11	9	13	12	7	4	6	14	5	15
Javelin throw	M	4	0	3	9	5	10	12	14	15	8	6	2	11	7	13
Javelin throw	W	7	0	4	3	5	11	8	14	15	12	6	2	9	10	13
Country		AAS	ALB	AND	ARM	AZE	BIH	GEO	ISL	LAT	LUX	MKD	MLT	MDA	MNE	SVK
Total		130.5	65.5	149	301	312.5	352	338	430.5	484.5	396.5	190.5	243.5	455.5	275	531.5

=== Final standings ===
Pos	Country	Pts
1	Slovakia	531.5
2	Latvia	484.5
3	Moldova	455.5
4	Iceland	430.5
5	Luxembourg	396.5
6	Bosnia and Herzegovina	352
7	Georgia	338
8	Azerbaijan	312.5
9	Armenia	301
10	Montenegro	275
11	Malta	243.5
12	Macedonia	190.5
13	Andorra	149
14	AASSE	130.5
15	Albania	65.5
