= Athletics at the 2013 Summer Universiade – Women's 4 × 100 metres relay =

The women's 4 × 100 metres relay event at the 2013 Summer Universiade was held on 11–12 July.

== Medalists ==
| Gold | Silver | Bronze |
|---|---|---|
| Ukraine; Olesya Povh; Nataliya Pohrebnyak; Mariya Ryemyen; Viktoriya Piatachenko | United States; Vashti Thomas; Aurieyall Scott; Jade Barber; Tristie Johnson | Poland; Marika Popowicz; Weronika Wedler; Ewelina Ptak; Małgorzata Kołdej |

== Results ==
=== Heats ===
Qualification: First 3 teams of each heat (Q) plus the next 2 fastest (q) qualified for the final.

| Rank | Heat | Nation | Athletes | Time | Notes |
|---|---|---|---|---|---|
| 1 | 2 | Ukraine | Olesya Povh, Nataliya Pohrebnyak, Mariya Ryemyen, Viktoriya Piatachenko | 42.88 | Q |
| 2 | 2 | Poland | Marika Popowicz, Weronika Wedler, Ewelina Ptak, Małgorzata Kołdej | 44.00 | Q |
| 3 | 1 | United States | Vashti Thomas, Aurieyall Scott, Jade Barber, Tristie Johnson | 44.08 | Q |
| 4 | 1 | Russia | Yulia Kashina, Anastasiya Kocherzhova, Viktoriya Yarushkina, Ekaterina Kuzina | 44.25 | Q |
| 5 | 2 | Switzerland | Joelle Curti, Léa Sprunger, Ellen Sprunger, Joëlle Golay | 44.72 | Q |
| 6 | 1 | Chinese Taipei | Syu Yong-jie, Shen Wan-zhen, Ko Ching-ting, Liao Ching-hsien | 45.11 | Q |
| 7 | 1 | Thailand | Pimpika Kannikom, Supawan Thipat, Tassaporn Wannakit, Khanrutai Pakdee | 45.80 | q |
| 8 | 2 | Ghana | Asana Abubakari, Bless Dupeh, Adelaide Sagoe, Abigail Dzamesi | 49.41 | q |
| 9 | 1 | Estonia | Maarja Kalev, Kulli Kallas, Annika Sakkarias, Triin Eerme | 51.91 | |
| | 1 | Sierra Leone | | DNS | |
| | 2 | Lithuania | | DNS | |

=== Final ===
| Rank | Lane | Nation | Athletes | Time | Notes |
|---|---|---|---|---|---|
| 1st place, gold medalist(s) | 6 | Ukraine | Olesya Povh, Nataliya Pohrebnyak, Mariya Ryemyen, Viktoriya Piatachenko | 42.77 | |
| 2nd place, silver medalist(s) | 4 | United States | Vashti Thomas, Aurieyall Scott, Jade Barber, Tristie Johnson | 43.54 | |
| 3rd place, bronze medalist(s) | 5 | Poland | Marika Popowicz, Weronika Wedler, Ewelina Ptak, Małgorzata Kołdej | 43.81 | |
| 4 | 3 | Russia | Yulia Kashina, Anastasiya Kocherzhova, Viktoriya Yarushkina, Ekaterina Kuzina | 43.98 | |
| 5 | 8 | Chinese Taipei | Syu Yong-jie, Shen Wan-zhen, Ko Ching-ting, Liao Ching-hsien | 45.16 | |
| 6 | 2 | Thailand | Pimpika Kannikom, Supawan Thipat, Tassaporn Wannakit, Khanrutai Pakdee | 45.66 | |
| 7 | 1 | Ghana | Asana Abubakari, Bless Dupeh, Adelaide Sagoe, Abigail Dzamesi | 50.37 | |
| | 7 | Switzerland | Joelle Curti, Léa Sprunger, Ellen Sprunger, Joëlle Golay | DQ | |
