= Léa Sprunger =

Swiss track and field athlete

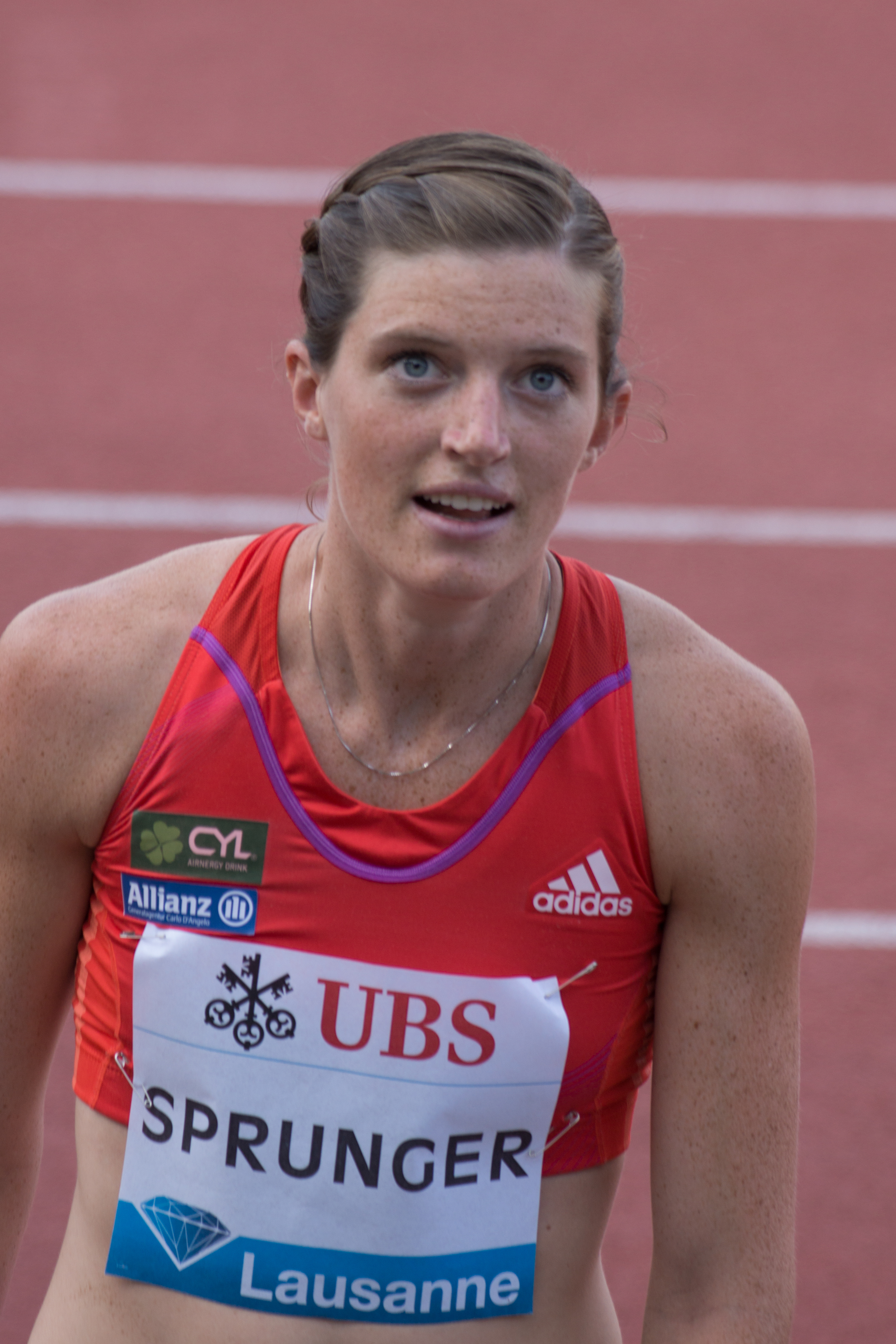
- Léa Sprunger at the 2012 Athletissima

Personal information
- Born: 5 March 1990 (age 36) Nyon, Vaud, Switzerland
- Home town: Gingins, VD
- Years active: 2007–2021
- Height: 1.83 m (6 ft 0 in)
- Weight: 67 kg (148 lb)

Sport
- Country: Switzerland
- Sport: Athletics
- Events: 200 m, 400 m hurdles
- Coached by: Laurent Meuwly
Medal record
Women's athletics
Representing Switzerland
European Championships
Gold medal – first place	2018 Berlin	400 m hurdles
Bronze medal – third place	2016 Amsterdam	400 m hurdles
European Indoor Championships
Gold medal – first place	2019 Glasgow	400 m

Léa Sprunger (born 5 March 1990) is a Swiss former track and field athlete. Originally a heptathlete like her older sister Ellen, she began concentrating on the 200 metres and 400 metres in 2011, and then on the 400 metres hurdles from 2015. Her best times in the 400 m and 400 m hurdles of 50.52 s (2018) and 54.06 s (2019) are the Swiss records. She finished fifth in the 400 m hurdles final at the 2017 World Championships, and went on to win the gold medal in the 400 m hurdles at the 2018 European Championships.

== Career ==
Born in Nyon, Vaud, Sprunger competed at the 2012 Summer Olympics in the women's 200 m event and the 4 × 100 m relay. At the 2016 Summer Olympics, she competed in the 400 m hurdles event and at the 2020 Summer Olympics in the 400 m hurdles event and the 4 × 400 m relay.

At the 2016 European Championships she finished third in the 400 m hurdles race. She won this event two years later at the 2018 European Championships.

Her personal best in the 400 m hurdles is 54.06 s set in Doha on 4 October 2019, also representing a new national record. She also holds the national record in the 400 metres with 50.52 s (set in La-Chaux-de-Fonds on 1 July 2018). In addition, she held the national record in the 200 metres for three years with 22.18 s (set in Geneva on 17 July 2016 and improved by Mujinga Kambundji on 24 August 2019).

Léa Sprunger retired from competitive athletics in September 2021.

== International championships ==
Year	Competition	Venue	Position	Event	Notes
Representing Switzerland
2007	World Youth Championships	Ostrava, Czech Republic	13th	Heptathlon (youth)	4878 pts
2007	European Youth Olympic Festival	Belgrade, Serbia	1st	4 × 100 m relay	46.17
2008	World Junior Championships	Bydgoszcz, Poland	10th	Heptathlon	5451 pts
2009	European Junior Championships	Novi Sad, Serbia	3rd	Heptathlon	5552 pts
2011	European U23 Championships	Ostrava, Czech Republic	16th	Heptathlon	4808 pts
2011	Universiade	Shenzhen, China	18th (sf)	200 m	24.17
2011	Universiade	Shenzhen, China	7th	4 × 100 m relay	44.65
2011	World Championships	Daegu, South Korea	13th (h)	4 × 100 m relay	44.04
2012	European Championships	Helsinki, Finland	13th (sf)	200 m	23.49
2012	European Championships	Helsinki, Finland	6th	4 × 100 m relay	43.61
2012	Olympic Games	London, United Kingdom	30th (h)	200 m	23.27
2012	Olympic Games	London, United Kingdom	13th (h)	4 × 100 m relay	43.54
2013	European Indoor Championships	Gothenburg, Sweden	17th (h)	400 m	54.45
2013	Universiade	Kazan, Russia	11th (sf)	200 m	23.80
2013	Universiade	Kazan, Russia	5th (h)	4 × 100 m relay	44.72^{1}
2013	World Championships	Moscow, Russia	12th (h)	4 × 100 m relay	43.21
2013	Jeux de la Francophonie	Nice, France	2nd	200 m	23.83
2013	Jeux de la Francophonie	Nice, France	2nd	4 × 100 m relay	45.01
2014	World Relays	Nassau, Bahamas	3rd (B)	4 × 100 m relay	43.55
2014	World Relays	Nassau, Bahamas	5th	4 × 200 m relay	1:31.75
2014	European Championships	Zürich, Switzerland	9th (sf)	200 m	23.12
2014	European Championships	Zürich, Switzerland	4th (h)	4 × 100 m relay	42.98^{2}
2015	European Indoor Championships	Prague, Czech Republic	20th (h)	400 m	53.97
2015	World Relays	Nassau, Bahamas	8th	4 × 100 m relay	43.74
2015	World Championships	Beijing, China	13th (sf)	400 m hurdles	55.83
2015	World Championships	Beijing, China	13th (h)	4 × 100 m relay	43.38
2016	European Championships	Amsterdam, Netherlands	3rd	400 m hurdles	55.41
2016	Olympic Games	Rio de Janeiro, Brazil	25th (h)	400 m hurdles	56.58
2017	European Indoor Championships	Belgrade, Serbia	5th	400 m	53.08
2017	World Championships	London, United Kingdom	5th	400 m hurdles	54.59
2018	World Indoor Championships	Birmingham, United Kingdom	6th (h)	400 m	52.46^{3}
2018	European Championships	Berlin, Germany	1st	400 m hurdles	54.33
2019	European Indoor Championships	Glasgow, United Kingdom	1st	400 m	51.61
2019	European Indoor Championships	Glasgow, United Kingdom	6th	4 × 400 m relay	3:33.72
2019	World Relays	Yokohama, Japan	7th	4 × 400 m relay	3:32.32
2019	World Championships	Doha, Qatar	4th	400 m hurdles	54.06
2019	World Championships	Doha, Qatar	14th (h)	4 × 400 m relay	3:30.63
2021	European Indoor Championships	Toruń, Poland	10th (sf)	400 m	52.64
2021	Olympic Games	Tokyo, Japan	11th (sf)	400 m hurdles	55.12
2021	Olympic Games	Tokyo, Japan	12th (h)	4 × 400 m relay	3:25.90

^{1}Disqualified in the final

^{2}Did not finish in the final

^{3}Disqualified in the semifinals
