= Sónia Tavares =

Portuguese sprinter

Sónia de Fátima Tavares (born 21 March 1986 in Cebolais de Cima) is a Portuguese athlete who specialises in the sprinting events. She represented her country in the 100 metres at the 2009 World Championships reaching the quarterfinals.

== Competition record ==
Year	Competition	Venue	Position	Event	Notes
Representing Portugal
2005	European Junior Championships	Kaunas, Lithuania	6th	100 m	11.94
2007	European Indoor Championships	Birmingham, United Kingdom	33rd (h)	60 m	7.58
2007	European U23 Championships	Debrecen, Hungary	17th (h)	100 m	11.77 (wind: 0.6 m/s)
2007	Universiade	Bangkok, Thailand	21st (qf)	100 m	11.99
2009	Universiade	Belgrade, Serbia	3rd	100 m	11.54
2009	Lusophony Games	Lisbon, Portugal	2nd	100 m	11.39
2009	Lusophony Games	Lisbon, Portugal	1st	200 m	23.64
2009	Lusophony Games	Lisbon, Portugal	2nd	4 × 100 m relay	45.05
2009	World Championships	Berlin, Germany	28th (qf)	100 m	11.55
2010	Ibero-American Championships	San Fernando, Spain	7th	100 m	11.74
2010	Ibero-American Championships	San Fernando, Spain	7th	200 m	24.37
2010	European Championships	Barcelona, Spain	22nd (h)	200 m	24.14
2011	European Indoor Championships	Paris, France	16th (sf)	60 m	7.40
2011	Universiade	Shenzhen, China	9th (sf)	100 m	23.75
2011	Universiade	Shenzhen, China	12th (sf)	200 m	23.89
2012	World Indoor Championships	Istanbul, Turkey	26th (h)	60 m	7.45
2012	European Championships	Helsinki, Finland	25th (h)	100 m	11.65
2012	European Championships	Helsinki, Finland	25th (h)	200 m	24.00
2013	Universiade	Kazan, Russia	14th (sf)	100 m	11.85
2013	Universiade	Kazan, Russia	12th (sf)	200 m	23.89

== Personal bests ==
Outdoor

- 100 metres – 11.39 (+2.0 m/s) (Lisbon 2009)
- 200 metres – 23.43 (+1.3 m/s) (Budapest 2010)

Indoor

- 60 metres – 7.32 (Mondeville 2012)
- 200 metres – 25.41 (Espinho 2006)
