= Ezinne Okparaebo =

Norwegian sprinter (born 1988)

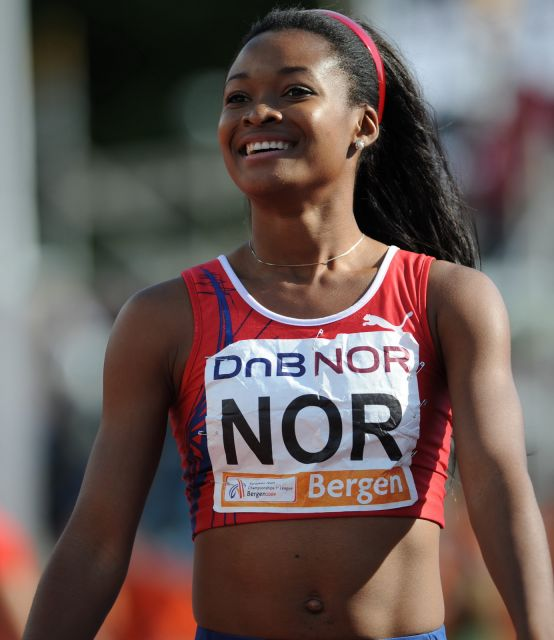
- Okparaebo under EM for lag, 2009

Personal information
- Full name: Ezinne Okparaebo
- Nationality: Norwegian
- Born: 3 March 1988 (age 38) Imo State, Nigeria

Sport
- Country: Norway
- Sport: Athletics
- Event(s): 60m, 100m, 200m
- Club: Norna-Salhus
- Coached by: Thomas Prange

Achievements and titles
- National finals: Thirteen, (2005, 2006, 2007, 2008, 2009, 2010, 2011, 2012, 2013, 2014, 2015, 2016, 2018)
Medal record
Sprinter
Representing Norway
European Championships
Gold medal – first place	2007 European Athletics Junior Championships	100m
Silver medal – second place	2009 European Athletics Indoor Championships	60m
Bronze medal – third place	2011 European Athletics Indoor Championships	60m
European Cup
Gold medal – first place	2008 European Cup	100m
European Team Championships (Super League)
Silver medal – second place	2010 European Team Championships	100m
European Team Championships (First League)
Gold medal – first place	2009 Bergen	100m
Gold medal – first place	2011 İzmir	100m
Gold medal – first place	2014 Tallinn	100m
National Championships Norway
Gold medal – first place	2018 National Championships Norway	100m
Gold medal – first place	2016 National Championships Norway	100m
Gold medal – first place	2015 National Championships Norway	100m
Gold medal – first place	2014 National Championships Norway	100m
Gold medal – first place	2013 National Championships Norway	100m
Gold medal – first place	2012 National Championships Norway	100m
Gold medal – first place	2011 National Championships Norway	100m
Gold medal – first place	2010 National Championships Norway	100m
Gold medal – first place	2009 National Championships Norway	100m
Gold medal – first place	2008 National Championships Norway	100m
Gold medal – first place	2007 National Championships Norway	100m
Gold medal – first place	2006 National Championships Norway	100m
Gold medal – first place	2005 National Championships Norway	100m
Silver medal – second place	2006 National Championships Norway	200m

Ezinne Okparaebo // (born 3 March 1988) is a Norwegian sprinter. She is Scandinavia's fastest woman ever over 60m and 100m. Okparaebo has won the 100m national title 13 times. She moved to Norway as a nine-year old and grew up in Ammerud. She visited the Haugen skole, where her sprinting talent was discovered on a sports school day. She has been the top female sprinter in Norway since 2005, and is competing for the club IL Norna-Salhus. She won the silver medal at 60 metres for women in the 2009 European Athletics Indoor Championships and the bronze medal in the same discipline in 2011 European Athletics Indoor Championships.

Her younger sisters are also athletes. Chiamaka Okparaebo specializes in triple and long jump. Angelica Okparaebo is also a track and field athlete.

== Personal records ==
(Figures in brackets indicate the placement on the Norwegian statistics of all time)

=== Indoors ===
- 60 metres (indoors): 7,10 (1.) – Prague, Czech-Republic, 9. March 2015
- 100 metres (indoors): 11,42 – Florø, 21. Februar 2009
- 200 metres: 25,94 – Stange, 19. February 2006

=== Outdoors ===
- 60 metres: 7,69 (n/a) – Asker, 28. May 2005
- 100 metres: 11,10 (1.) – London, 4. August 2012
- 150 metres: 17,31, – Oslo, 19. Mai 2010
- 200 metres: 23,30 (2.) – Florø, 2. June 2012

== Career ==
=== 2005 ===
In 2005 Okparaebo surprised the Norwegian sprinters and became Norway's best sprinter aged only 17. Okparaebo participated for the first time in Youth-Olympics, which was held in Lignano, Italy. There she came third in 100 metres. On 19 August, the same year, she won the golden medal over 100 metres in the Norwegian National Championships, running the time of 11,71 seconds.

=== 2006 ===
During the National Championships in Norway in 2006, Okparaebo defended the gold from 2005, and at the same time set a new personal record of 11.70. This happened with 1.5 seconds of headwind. She also participated in the Junior World Championships in Athletics 2006, in both 100 meters and 200 meters. She reached the semi-finals of 100 meters, but time 11.83 was not enough for a place in the finals. At 200 meters she ran at 24.43 in her qualifying heat, which was a fourth place in the heat, but not enough for the semi-finals.

=== 2007 ===
During an indoor event in Florø in February, she took an eleven-year-old 60-meter record with a time of 7.36. Less than an hour later, she put another record indoors at 100 meters, with 11.78. During another meeting in June in Florø she beat Olympic and World Cup medalist Merlene Ottey at 100 meters when she ran in at 11.43. Ottey was 47 years old at that time. The time was very close to the old Norwegian record, but it was not approved because of too strong tailwind. In July during the Junior European Championship in athletics in Hengelo in the Netherlands, she won the gold medal and set a new Norwegian junior record of 11.45 at 100 metres. She also defended her victory at 100 meters in the Norwegian nationals.

=== 2008 ===
Okparaebo made her debut in the Olympics in Beijing by running 100 meters. In the first qualifying round of 100 meters she ran into second place in the heat and set new Norwegian record with the time 11.32 seconds. In the quarterfinals, she ran in at 11.45 sec, and did not reach the finals. She participated in the 2008 IAAF World Indoor Championships in Barcelona, where she ran 60 meters. She qualified for the semifinals with 7.42 in the qualification. Despite having her season best in the semi-finals, with 7.34, she did not reach the final since she entered sixth place. In addition, for the fourth consecutive year, she became a Norwegian champion of 100 meters.

=== 2009 ===
The season started with the indoor European Championship in Turin, where she won the silver at 60 meters, and set a new Norwegian record of 7.21. Okparaebo was three hundredth seconds behind the winner Yevgeniya Polyakova. During Bislett Games she set a new Norwegian record of 100 meters with time 11.29. In the 2009 World Championships in Athletics in Berlin, she easily qualified for the quarterfinals by being second in her experimental heat at the time of 11.35. In the quarterfinals, it was nearly a tenth slower than in the first heat, which meant that she did not come to the semi-finals. She also defended her title as a Norwegian champion of 100 meters.

=== 2010 ===
Okparaebo set a new Norwegian record of 100 meters in Bislett Games with the time of 11.26. During the 2010 European Athletics Championships in Barcelona, she again set a new Norwegian record of 100 meters with the time 11.23 in the semi-final. She came fourth with the same time as in the semi-finals, only five hundredths of a second from the medal. For the sixth year in a row she won National Championships over 100 meters.

=== 2011 ===
She set in February indoors a new Norwegian record of 60 meters with 7.17 seconds during a meet in Karlsruhe. In the 2011 European Athletics Indoor Championships she won bronze with 7.20 sec. She once again became a Norwegian champion of 100 meters, with the time 11.57. In the experimental heat during the 2011 World Championships in Athletics in South Korea, Okparaebo set a new Norwegian record with the time 11.20. In the semi-finals, she ran nearly three decades slower and was far from a final place.

=== 2012 ===
Okparaebo started the outdoor season on 2 June with the Florø Athletics Festival, where she set new Norwegian records both in 100 meters with 11.16 (+2 m/s) and 200 meters with 23.30 sec. She thereby not only improved her own record of 100 meters, but also got the record of 200 meters, an almost 30-year-old record from Mona Evjen (set on 22 August 1982). During the 2012 Summer Olympics in London, there was a new Norwegian record of 11.14 in the opening session (fourth place), which made her move on to the semi-finals on time. In the semi-finals she still set a new Norwegian record of 11.10, but it did not fit into the final. Her time was the 10th best time in the three semifinals and the best European time, but only eight runners went to the finals. She was only 0.10 seconds apart from the final. In National Champions in Athletics 2012, she won gold at 100 meters for the eighth time in a row.

=== 2013 ===
She came in sixth place at 100 meters in the Diamond League meeting at Bislett Games on 13 June. Later in June she participated in the Team European Championships in Athletics 2013, where she came seventh. She participated in the 2013 World Championships in Athletics in Moscow, where she ran her season best in the qualifying heat with time 11.23. In the semi-finals, she managed only 11.41, which was the 20. best overall, and she did not go to the final.

In the Norwegian Championship in Athletics 2013 in August, she won gold at 100 meters for the ninth time in her career. Her time was 11.30, which was a new championship record, that also got her her first ever royal trophy.

=== 2014 ===
Okparaebo opened the season on 1 February, with 7.18 seconds on 60 meters in an IAAF indoor event in Karlsruhe. German Verena Sailer won the race, but all three fastest runners got the same time in this race. On 31 May, she won 100 meters at the Kurpfalz Gala in Weinheim, with the time of 11.25. She ran 100 meters at 11.40 under the Bislett Games 11 June, which was enough for the fourth place. [10] Myriam Soumare won the race, at time 11,18.

She won 100 meters in European Team Championships in Athletics 2014 in Tallinn, Estonia, at the time of 11.41. Ksenija Balta came in second, and Hanna-Maari Latvala in third place, and she thus obtained Norway twelve points in the fight for promotion from First League to Super League.

In the European Championship in Athletics 2014 in Zurich in August she ran 100 meters. At the opening session, she ran at 11.24, which was the best time of the year for her, and went on to the semi-final. However, she finished fourth in her semifinal, with the time 11,46, and did not go to the final. She won 100 meters in NM in Athletics 2014, which was her tenth National Championships gold in a row, and also got another royal trophy for this NM gold.

=== 2015 ===
During the IFAM conference indoors in GGhent on 7 February, Okparaebo won 60 metres with the time 7.24. In March, she participated in the 2015 European Athletics Indoor Championships in Prague, where she qualified for the final with 7.17 in the opening session and 7.15 in the semifinal. In the final, she ran in at 7.10 and set a new Norwegian record, and ended in fourth place, 0.01 second behind German Verena Sailer who got the bronze medal. She opened her season outdoors in a meet in Ghent on 24 May, where she won 100 meters with time 11.68.

On 11 June, she participated in Bislett Games, but came in the eight place. She ran at 11.53, which was half a second behind the winner, Murielle Ahouré . In the Team-EM in Athletics 2015 (Super League), the Norwegian relay team entered a new Norwegian record of 4 × 100 meters, with the time 43.94. Okparaebo ran here with Isabelle Pedersen, Ida Bakke Hansen and Elisabeth Slettum, and they came in seventh place. She also participated at 100 meters individually, but had a lot of headwind in her heat (-4.3 m / s), and came in seventh place with time 11.80.

In the World Challenge Conference in Madrid on 11 July, she ran 100 meters at 11.24, and qualified for the 2015 World Championships in Athletics in Beijing in August. In the Norwegian Championship in Athletics 2015 in Haugesund, she won 100 meters for the 11th consecutive year.

During the 2015 World Championships in Athletics, she reached the semi-finals of 100 meters with the time 11,12 in the experimental heat. Despite 1.2 meters of headwind she was just two hundredths of a second behind her own record. The race was therefore referred to as perhaps her best race in the career. Okparaebo got the 18th best time in the semi-finals, with 11.19 seconds, and went no further.

=== 2016 ===
Okparaebo won the 60 meters in National Championships in Athletics Indoors 2016, which was arranged in the Rudhallen in Bærum. She ran in 7.17 seconds, which was a new championship record and 0.07 seconds from her own Norwegian record. She launched the outdoor season 30 April in Clermont, Florida, United States, in PURE Athletics Spring Invitational, where she ran 100 meters at 11.28 and met the required time for Summer Olympics 2016

In July she participated in 2016 European Athletics Championships . At 100 meters she was knocked out in the semifinals, where she ran at 11.44 and got 10th best time. Norway also participated in 4 × 100 meters, but got out in the opening session after they missed other exchanges. She won 100 meters during the NM in Athletics 2016, this was her twelfth national gold in a row at this distance.

She ran at 11.43 in the quarter finals during the Summer Olympics 2016 in Rio, but came fourth in her heat, and did not move on to the semi-final.

After the Olympics, she moved to London to change her training. She began training with the group Speedworks in the Lee Valley Athletics Center. She was told in December 2016, shortly before Christmas, that she won't be sponsored for 2017 from Norway's Athletics Federation, despite being their best female sprinter.

=== 2017 ===
She ran two good races indoors in February, with the time 7.19 in Karlsruhe on 4 February and 7.13 in Toruń in Poland on 10 February, which was also split best time in Europe so far in 2017. A minor injury made it not possible for her to compete in the 2017 European Athletics Indoor Championships in Belgrade.

In July, she took a pause from competition, among other things. to find your way back to the training pleasure, and to find out if she should go further with her athletics career. In December, she was back in full training, to bet on the 2018 season. She moved back to Oslo after finishing her training in London.

=== 2018 ===
In January 2018 it became known that Okparaebo will train for IL Norna-Salhus in 2018. She participated in the Indoor Meeting Karlsruhe 2018, where she came fifth in 60 meters with time 7.17. This was a new club record for Norna-Salhus, and enough to be qualified for the 2018 IAAF World Indoor Championships in Birmingham . She attended the Copernicus Cup in Poland and came third. She attended the 2018 IAAF World Indoor Championships, which was held in Birmingham. In the semi-finals she ran at 7.19, which was the 13th best time, and thus did not reach the final.

Outdoors, she participated in two competitions in Germany in May, where she ran 100 meters, and managed the qualification requirement for the 2018 European Athletics Championships in Berlin. She participated in Bislett Games, and came there in seventh place in the Diamond League race with 11.24 seconds. In August, she won her experimental heat in the European Championship, with 11.44 seconds, and went on to the semi-final where she ran 11.37.
