= Olesya Povh =

Ukrainian sprinter (born 1987)

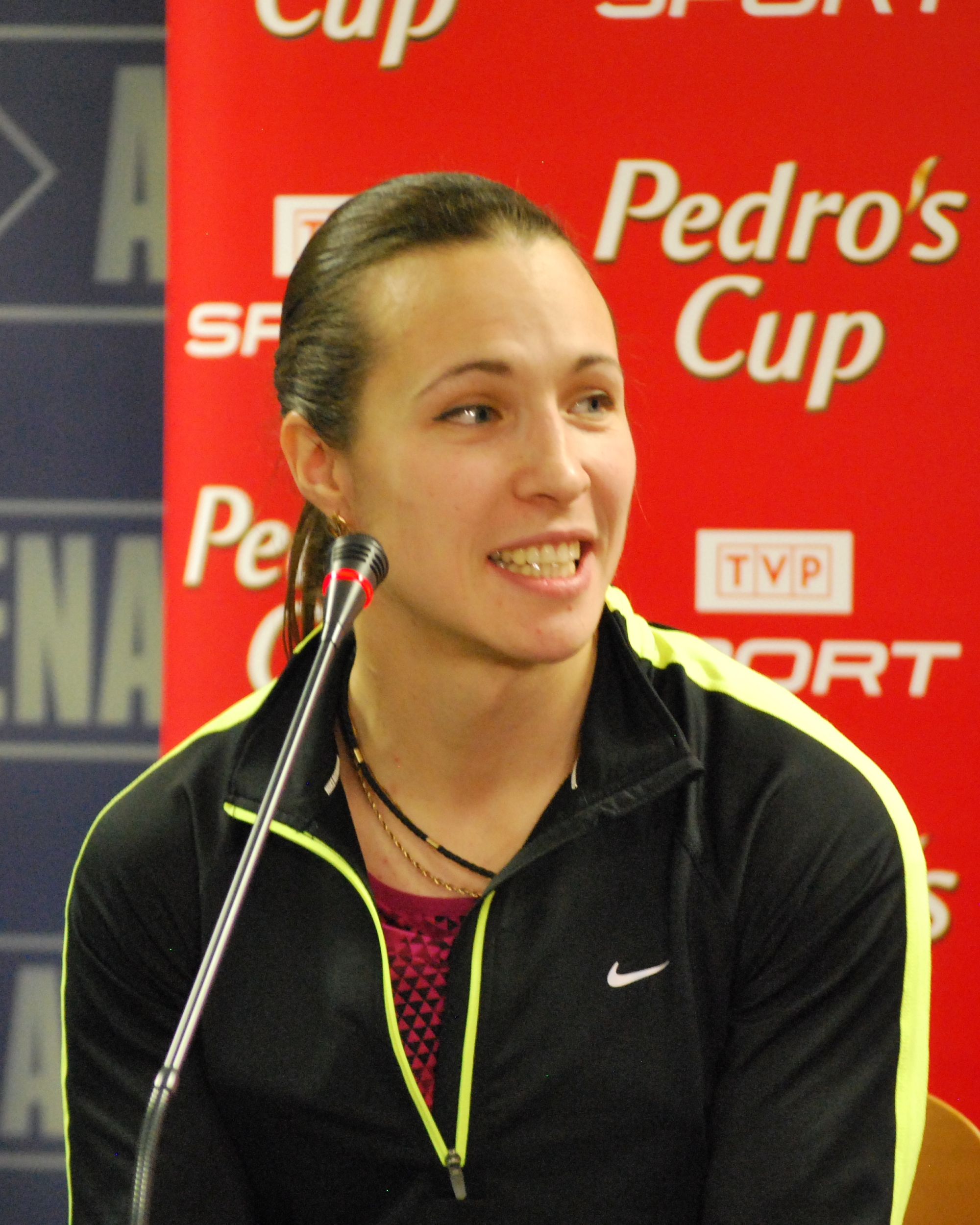
- Povh in 2015

Personal information
- Born: 18 October 1987 (age 39) Dnipropetrovsk, Ukrainian SSR, Soviet Union
- Height: 1.67 m (5 ft 5 1/2 in)
- Weight: 63 kg (139 lb)

Sport
- Country: Ukraine
- Sport: Athletics
- Event: 100 metres 60 metres
Medal record
Olympic Games
Bronze medal – third place	2012 London	4 × 100 m relay
World Championships
Bronze medal – third place	2011 Daegu	4 × 100 m relay
European Championships
Gold medal – first place	2010 Barcelona	4 × 100 m relay
Silver medal – second place	2012 Helsinki	100 m
European Team Championships
Gold medal – first place	2011 Stockholm	4 × 100 m relay
Gold medal – first place	2013 Gateshead	100 m
Gold medal – first place	2013 Gateshead	4 × 100 m relay
Silver medal – second place	2011 Stockholm	100 m
Bronze medal – third place	2010 Bergen	4 × 100 m relay
Bronze medal – third place	2017 Lille	4 × 100 m relay
European Indoor Championships
Gold medal – first place	2011 Paris	60 m
Continental Cup
Silver medal – second place	2010 Split	4 × 100 m relay
Universiade
Gold medal – first place	2013 Kazan	4 × 100 m relay
Military World Games
Bronze medal – third place	2011 Rio de Janeiro	100 m
Bronze medal – third place	2011 Rio de Janeiro	200 m
Bronze medal – third place	2011 Rio de Janeiro	4 × 100 m relay

Olesya Povh (Ukrainian: Олеся Іванівна Повх (Olesya Ivanivna Povkh); born 18 October 1987) is a Ukrainian former sprint athlete who specialized in the 100 metres. Her personal best times include 11.08 seconds in the 100 m, achieved in June 2012. She is an Olympic Games bronze medalist, World Championships bronze medalist, European Championships gold and silver medalist, and European Indoor Championships gold medalist.

== Early life ==
Povh is Jewish, and was born in Dnipropetrovsk, Ukraine. She graduated from the Dnipropetrovsk State Institute of Physical Culture and Sports in 2010 and chose to focus on athletics full-time in 2011.

== Career ==
Povh had her first year of international competition in 2010. She reached the semi-finals of the 60 metres at the 2010 IAAF World Indoor Championships and won a relay bronze medal with Ukraine at the 2010 European Team Championships. She gained selection for the 100 m at the 2010 European Athletics Championships and was eliminated in the semi-finals. However, she went on to have success at the competition as part of the Ukrainian 4 × 100 metres relay team: running with Nataliya Pohrebnyak, Mariya Ryemyen, and Yelyzaveta Bryzhina, the team won the gold medal in a national record time of 42.29 seconds – the fastest mark in the world that year. The team reprised their roles for the 2010 IAAF Continental Cup, representing Europe, and took the silver medal behind the Americas team.

Povh began 2011 with a 60 metres best run of 7.14 seconds, gaining selection for the 2011 European Athletics Indoor Championships. At the 2012 Olympic Games in London she and her teammates Khrystyna Stuy, Mariya Ryemyen, and Yelyzaveta Bryzhina won the bronze medals in the 4 × 100 metres relay by setting a new national record.

On the eve of the 2017 World Championships in Athletics, Povh failed a drug test and was suspended from competing in the championships. In March 2019, the CAS confirmed that Povh committed the anti-doping rule infractions and confirmed the UAF Executive Committee decisions about the disqualification of Povh for four years starting from 15 June 2016. Aged 31, the suspension effectively ended her international career.
