= Kai Selvon =

Trinidad and Tobago sprinter

Kai Freddie Selvon (born 13 April 1992 in Arima) is a Trinidadian track and field sprinter. At the 2012 Summer Olympics, she competed in the Women's 200 metres and the 4 x 100 m. She was also part of the Trinidadian 4 x 100 m team at the 2020 Summer Olympics. She also represented her country at the World Championships in Athletics in 2011 and 2013.

At the 2012 Summer Olympics, she set her personal best in the 200 m. Although the Trinidad and Tobago team reached the final in the 4 x 100 m team, the baton was dropped before it could be passed to Selvon. She was part of the Trinidad and Tobago team that won silver in the 4 x 100 m at the 2013 Central American and Caribbean Championships. She is a 4-time national champion, once in the 100 m (2011) and three times in the 200 m (2011, 2012 and 2013).

She missed out on the 2016 Olympic team, but was on the shortlist for the 4 x 100 m team.

Selvon competed for the Auburn Tigers track and field team in the NCAA, where she studied Industrial Design, graduating in 2014.
