= Yelyzaveta Bryzghina =

Ukrainian sprinter (born 1989)

Yelyzaveta Bryzhina
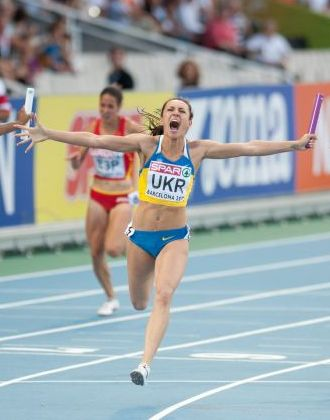
- Bryzhina as the final runner of Ukraine's women's 4 × 100 m relay at the 2010 European Championships

Personal information
- Born: November 28, 1989 (age 36) Voroshilovgrad, Ukrainian SSR, Soviet Union
- Height: 1.73 m (5 ft 8 in)
- Weight: 63 kg (139 lb)
Medal record
Women's athletics
Representing Ukraine
Olympic Games
Bronze medal – third place	2012 London	4 × 100 m relay
European Championships
Gold medal – first place	2010 Barcelona	4 × 100 metres relay
Silver medal – second place	2010 Barcelona	200 metres
European Team Championships
Gold medal – first place	2010 Bergen	200 m
Bronze medal – third place	2017 Lille	4 × 100 m relay
European Junior Championships
Silver medal – second place	2007 Hengelo	200 m
Silver medal – second place	2007 Hengelo	4 × 100 m relay
Continental Cup
Silver medal – second place	2010 Split	200 metres
Silver medal – second place	2010 Split	4 × 100 metre relay
Universiade
Gold medal – first place	2011 Shenzhen	4 × 100 m relay
European Youth Olympic Festival
Gold medal – first place	2005 Lignano Sabbiadoro	100 m

Yelyzaveta Viktorivna Bryzhina (Ukrainian: Єлизавета Вікторівна Бризгіна; born 18 November 1989, in Voroshilovgrad) is a Ukrainian sprint athlete specialising in the 100 metres.

Her personal best times are 11.42 seconds in the 100 m (outdoor), achieved in May 2016 in Kirovograd; and 22.44 seconds in the 200 metres, achieved in July 2010 in Barcelona.

== Personal life ==
Bryzhina is the daughter of the successful Soviet athletes Olha Bryzhina and Viktor Bryzhin, and sister of Anastasiia Bryzgina.

Bryzhina was a student at the Luhansk Taras Shevchenko National University on a sports scholarship.

== Career ==
Yelizaveta and her mother Olha have achieved the same best performance over 200 m of 22.44 seconds.

Bryzhina was part (with Nataliya Pohrebnyak, Mariya Ryemyen and Olesya Povh) of the Ukrainian women's 4 × 100 m relay, that won gold during the 2010 European Athletics with 42.29, the fastest time in the world that year. Bryzhina won silver in the (individual) 200 m during this championship when she ran 22.44 (gold went to France's Myriam Soumare).

At the 2012 Olympic Games in London, she and her teammates Olesya Povh, Mariya Ryemyen and Hrystyna Stuy took the bronze medals in the 4 × 100 metres relay, setting a new national record.

She served a two-year doping ban for the use of the banned anabolic steroid drostanolone, having tested positive at the 2013 World Championships. The ban lasted from 15 August 2013 to 27 August 2015.
