= Myriam Soumaré =

French sprinter

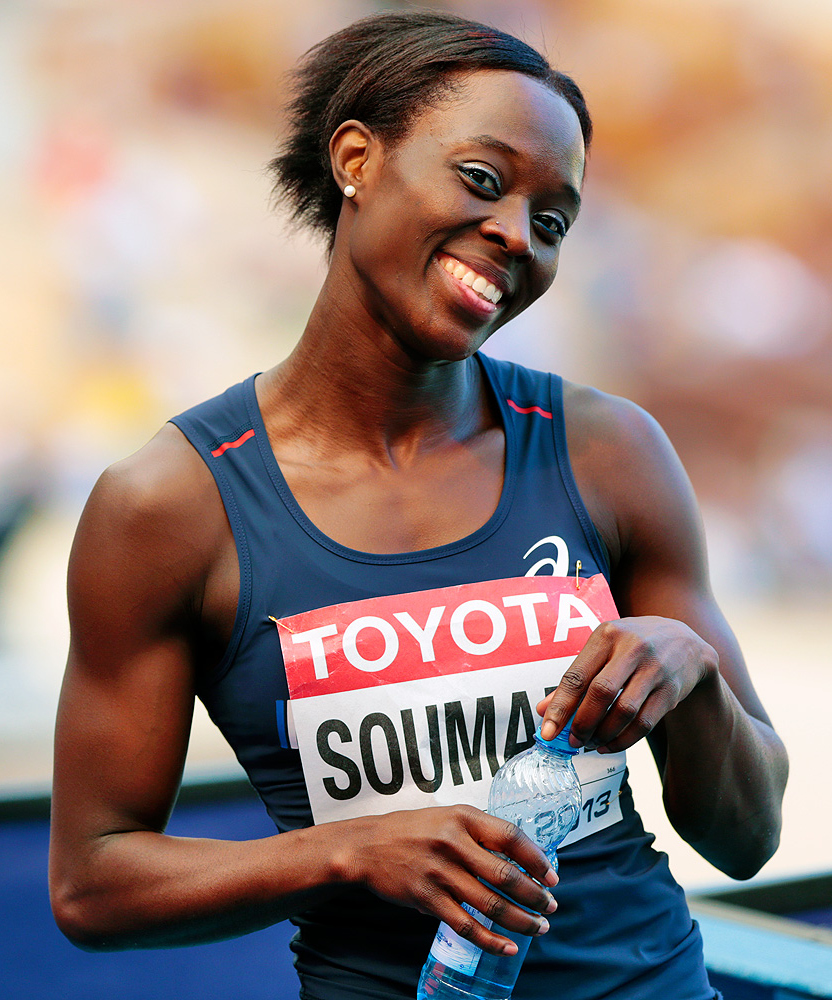
- Soumaré in 2013 World Championships in Moscow

Personal information
- Nationality: France
- Born: 29 October 1986 (age 39) Paris, France
- Height: 167 cm (5 ft 6 in)
- Weight: 57 kg (126 lb)

Sport
- Sport: Sprint
- Events: 50 metres, 60 metres, 100 metres, 200 metres, 400 metres, 4 × 100 m relay, 4 × 400 m relay

Achievements and titles
- Personal bests: 100 m outdoor: 11.03 s (Zurich, 2014)(-0.4); 200 m outdoor: 22.11 s (Brussels, 2014)(+0.1)
Medal record
Women's athletics
Representing France
European Championships
Gold medal – first place	2010 Barcelona	200 metres
Silver medal – second place	2010 Barcelona	4 × 100 m relay
Silver medal – second place	2014 Zürich	100 m
Silver medal – second place	2014 Zürich	4 × 100 m
Bronze medal – third place	2010 Barcelona	100 metres
Bronze medal – third place	2012 Helsinki	200 metres
Bronze medal – third place	2014 Zürich	200 m
European Indoor Championships
Silver medal – second place	2013 Gothenburg	60 metres
Mediterranean Games
Gold medal – first place	2009 Pescara	4 × 100 m relay
Silver medal – second place	2009 Pescara	100 m
European U23 Championships
Bronze medal – third place	2007 Debrecen	100 m

Myriam Soumaré (born 29 October 1986) is a retired French track and field sprinter. She announced her retirement from athletics in February 2016.

== Athletics career ==
=== 2008–2009 ===
Soumaré made her Olympic debut at the 2008 Summer Olympics in Beijing. She competed in only one event – the 4 × 100 meters relay together with Muriel Hurtis-Houairi, Lina Jacques-Sébastien and Carima Louami. In their first round heat they did not finish and were eliminated, due to a mistake with the baton exchange.

In her debut World Championships appearance at 2009, Soumaré took part in only one event – the 100 metres. She was eliminated in the quarter-finals of that event.

=== 2010 – three medals at the European Championships ===
At the 2010 European Championships – her debut appearance in the European Championships – in Barcelona, Soumaré won the gold medal in the 200 metres with a time of 22.32 seconds in lane 8, shaving her previous personal best time by 0.69 second in doing so. She also won the 4 × 100 metres relay silver medal and the 100 metres bronze medal with a personal best time of 11.18 seconds, which was an improvement of 0.16 second over her previous personal best time.

=== 2011 ===
At the 2011 World Championships in Daegu, Soumaré participated in three events – the 100 metres, 200 metres and 4 × 100 metres relay. She was eliminated in the semi-finals of the 100 and 200 metres events. Her 4 × 100 metres relay team finished in fourth place in the final.

=== 2012 – 7th in the 200 m Olympic final ===
Soumaré represented France in three events at the 2012 Summer Olympics in London: 100 m, 200 m and 4 × 100 m relay. She finished seventh in the 200 m final in a time of 22.63 sec. She achieved the 11th fastest time in the 100 m semi-finals and thus did not qualify for the final. In the first round heats of the 4 × 100 m relay, her team botched its last two baton exchanges and was disqualified for out-of-zone baton exchange.

Soumaré was the 200 metres runner-up of the 2012 IAAF Diamond League, behind Charonda Williams.

=== 2013 – European Indoor Championships 60 m silver medal ===
Soumaré won her first European Indoor Championships medal at the 2013 European Indoor Championships – a silver for the 60 metres. She had initially won the bronze. But the initial winner of the 60 m final, Tezdzhan Naimova, was stripped of her gold medal after being found guilty of doping during the competition. Soumaré was thus elevated to receive the silver medal.

At the 2013 World Championships in Moscow, Soumaré took part in three events – the 100 metres, 200 metres and 4 × 100 metres relay. She was eliminated in the semi-finals of the 100 and 200 metres events. Her 4 × 100 metres relay team finished the third fastest among the 19 national teams taking part in the heats, and thus qualified for the final. In the final, the French team – consisting of Céline Distel-Bonnet, Ayodelé Ikuesan, Soumaré and Stella Akakpo running in the first, second, third and fourth legs respectively – finished the race in second position (42.73 seconds) behind Jamaica. The French relay team members were duly presented their silver medals during the medal ceremony. After the medal ceremony, the British team filed a protest against the French team, claiming that the latter had an out-of-zone baton handover between Ikuesan and Soumaré. More than two hours after the race, the French relay team was officially disqualified. The French delegation appealed against their disqualification, but it was in vain. Consequently, the American team was upgraded to the silver medal and the British team received the bronze medal. Bernard Amsalem, the president of the Fédération française d'athlétisme, called the French team's disqualification "an outrage". He explained that normally the decision to disqualify a team had to be made before the medal ceremony and teams had to file protests within thirty minutes from the end of the race.

=== 2015 ===
Soumaré took a year off from athletics in 2015.

=== Retirement ===
On 24 February 2016, Soumaré announced her retirement from athletics, while leaving open the possibility of making a comeback in the future.

== Personal life ==
Soumaré's parents are of Mauritanian origin. She has four siblings and is a Muslim. She lives with them in the northern Paris suburb of Villiers-le-Bel.

Soumaré works as a childcare assistant in a childcare centre. She wears a headscarf in her daily life but takes it off when she is on the track.

Soumaré gave birth to her first child, a boy, in June 2015.

== International competitions ==
- Note: Only the position in the final is indicated, unless otherwise stated

Year	Competition	Venue	Position	Event	Notes
Representing France
2007	European U23 Championships	Debrecen, Hungary	3rd	100 m	11.68 (wind: -2.0 m/s)
2007	European U23 Championships	Debrecen, Hungary	6th	4 × 100 m relay	44.34
2009	Mediterranean Games	Pescara, Italy	2nd	100 m	11.46 (wind: +1.0 m/s)
2009	Mediterranean Games	Pescara, Italy	1st	4 × 100 m relay	43.79
2010	World Indoor Championships	Doha, Qatar	7th	60 m	7.29
2010	European Championships	Barcelona, Spain	3rd	100 m	11.18 (wind: -0.6 m/s)
2010	European Championships	Barcelona, Spain	1st	200 m	22.32 (wind: +0.1 m/s)
2010	European Championships	Barcelona, Spain	2nd	4 × 100 m relay	42.45
2011	European Indoor Championships	Paris, France	7th	60 m	7.24
2011	World Championships	Daegu, South Korea	4th	4 × 100 m relay	42.70
2012	European Championships	Helsinki, Finland	3rd	200 m	23.21 (wind: -1.3 m/s)
2012	Olympic Games	London, England	7th	200 m	22.63 (wind: -0.2 m/s)
2013	European Indoor Championships	Gothenburg, Sweden	2nd	60 m	7.11
2013	European Indoor Championships	Gothenburg, Sweden	4th	4 × 400 m relay	3:28.71
2013	European Team Championships	Gateshead, England	2nd	100 m	11.66
2013	European Team Championships	Gateshead, England	2nd	200 m	23.05
2013	World Championships	Moscow, Russia	3rd (heats)^{†}	4 × 100 m relay	42.25^{†}
2014	European Championships	Zürich, Switzerland	2nd	100 m	11.16
2014	European Championships	Zürich, Switzerland	3rd	200 m	22.58
2014	European Championships	Zürich, Switzerland	2nd	4 × 100 m relay	42.45

^{†}: Disqualified in the final.

== Medal record ==
- 2007 European Athletics U23 Championships in Debrecen :
  - (bronze) bronze in the 100 m in 11 s 68
- 2009 Mediterranean Games in Pescara
  - (gold) gold in the 4 × 100 m relay in 43 s 79
  - (silver) silver in the 100 m in 11 s 46
- 2010 European Athletics Championships in Barcelona :
  - (gold) gold in the 200 m in 22 s 32 (personal best)
  - (silver) silver in the 4 × 100 m relay in 42s 45
  - (bronze) bronze in the 100 m in 11 s 18
- 2012 European Athletics Championships in Helsinki :
  - (bronze) bronze in the 200 m in 23 s 21
- 2013 European Athletics Indoor Championships in Gothenburg :
  - (silver) silver in the 60 m in 7 s 11
