= Nataliya Pohrebnyak =

Russian-Ukrainian sprinter (born 1988)

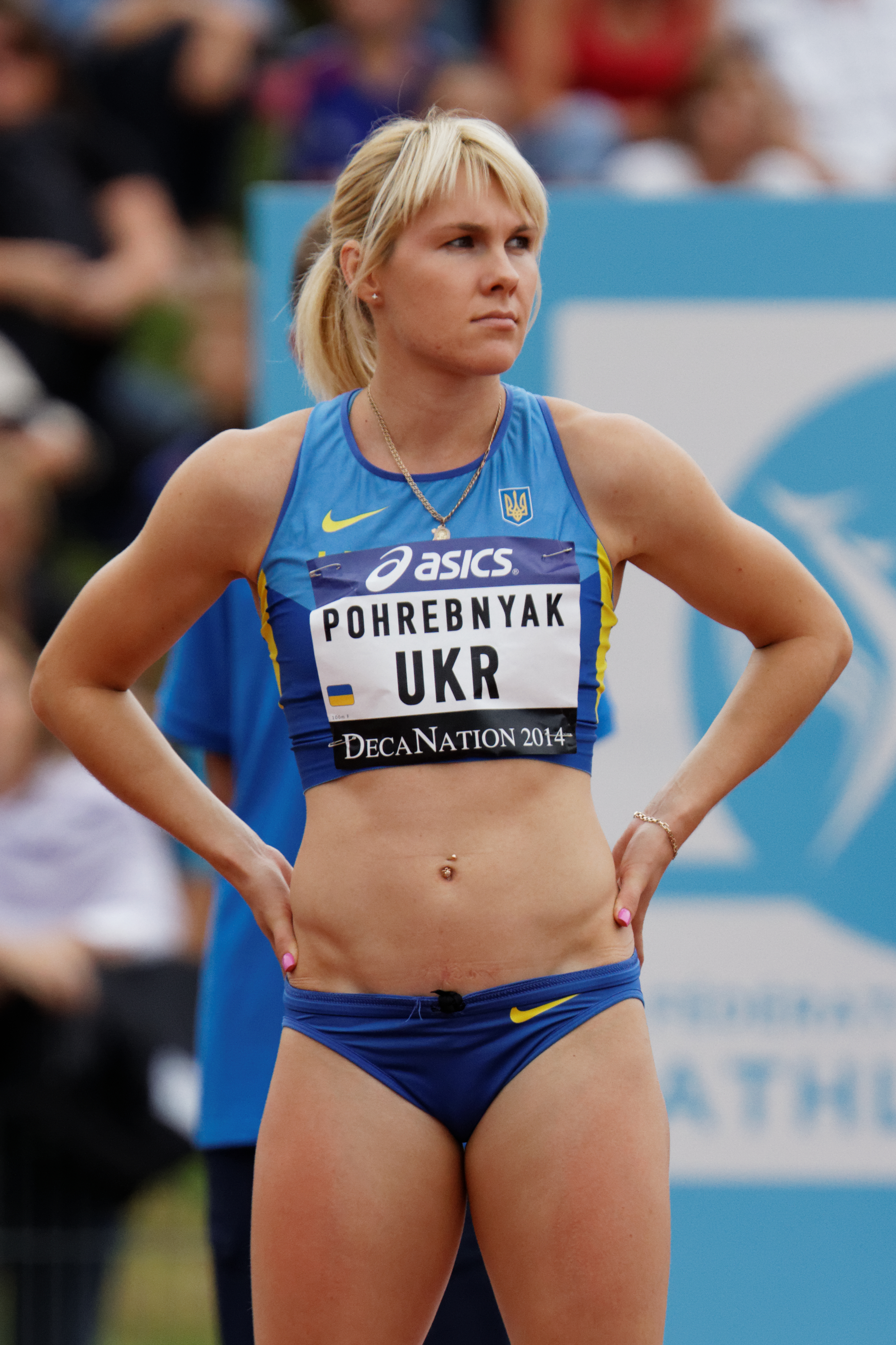
- Pohrebnyak at the 2014 DécaNation

Personal information
- Born: 19 February 1988 (age 38) Kupiansk, Kharkiv Oblast, Ukrainian SSR, Soviet Union
- Height: 1.71 m (5 ft 7 1/2 in)
- Weight: 63 kg (139 lb)

Sport
- Country: Ukraine(2002–2016); Russia (2017–)
- Sport: Athletics
- Event: 100 metres
Medal record
World Championships
Bronze medal – third place	2011 Daegu	4 × 100 m relay
European Championships
Gold medal – first place	2010 Barcelona	4 × 100 m relay
European Team Championships
Gold medal – first place	2011 Stockholm	4 × 100 m relay
Universiade
Gold medal – first place	2011 Shenzhen	4 × 100 m relay
Gold medal – first place	2013 Kazan	4 × 100 m relay
European Junior Championships
Silver medal – second place	2007 Hengelo	4 × 100 m relay

Nataliya Olehivna Pohrebniak (Ukrainian: Наталія Олегівна Погребняк, born 19 February 1988) is a Russian-Ukrainian sprint athlete who specializes in the 100 metres. Pohrebniak (with Yelizaveta Bryzhina, Mariya Ryemyen and Olesya Povh) was part of the Ukrainian women's 4 × 100 m that won gold during the 2010 European Athletics with 42.29 – the fastest time in the world that year. She changed her allegiance to Russia after 2016 and began competing in Russian national competitions in 2019.

== Biography ==
Pohrebnyak was born in the Kharkiv Oblast, and represents the club Dynamo Kharkiv. In the 100 metres she finished fourth at the 2007 European Junior Championships, and won the silver medal at the 2009 European U23 Championships. In the 200 metres she finished seventh at the 2009 European U23 Championships. She also competed at the 2004 and 2006 World Junior Championships and the 2007 and 2009 World Championships, as well as the 2008 Olympic Games. In the Olympic 100 metres race she placed fourth in her first round heat, which normally meant elimination. However, her time of 11.60 was among the ten fastest losing times, resulting in a second round spot. There she failed to qualify for the semi-finals as her time of 11.55 was the eighth fastest time in her race.

She won a silver medal at the 2007 European Junior Championships in the 4 × 100 metres relay. At the 2007 World Championships the Ukrainian team failed to finish the race. At the 2008 Olympic Games the Ukrainian 4 × 100 m team was disqualified. Disqualification also occurred at the 2004 World Junior Championships. She competed at the 2009 World Championships without reaching the final. At the 2009 European U23 Championships the team again failed to finish the race.

Her personal best times are 11.09 seconds in the 100 metres, achieved in 2015; and 22.64 seconds in the 200 metres, achieved in 2016 at the Rio Olympics.
