= Johanna Danois =

French sprinter

Johanna Danois (born 4 April 1987 in Saint-Claude, Guadeloupe) is a French sprinter. She competed for the French team in the 4 × 100 metres relay at the 2012 Summer Olympics, which was disqualified in Round 1.
