= Khrystyna Stuy =

Ukrainian sprinter

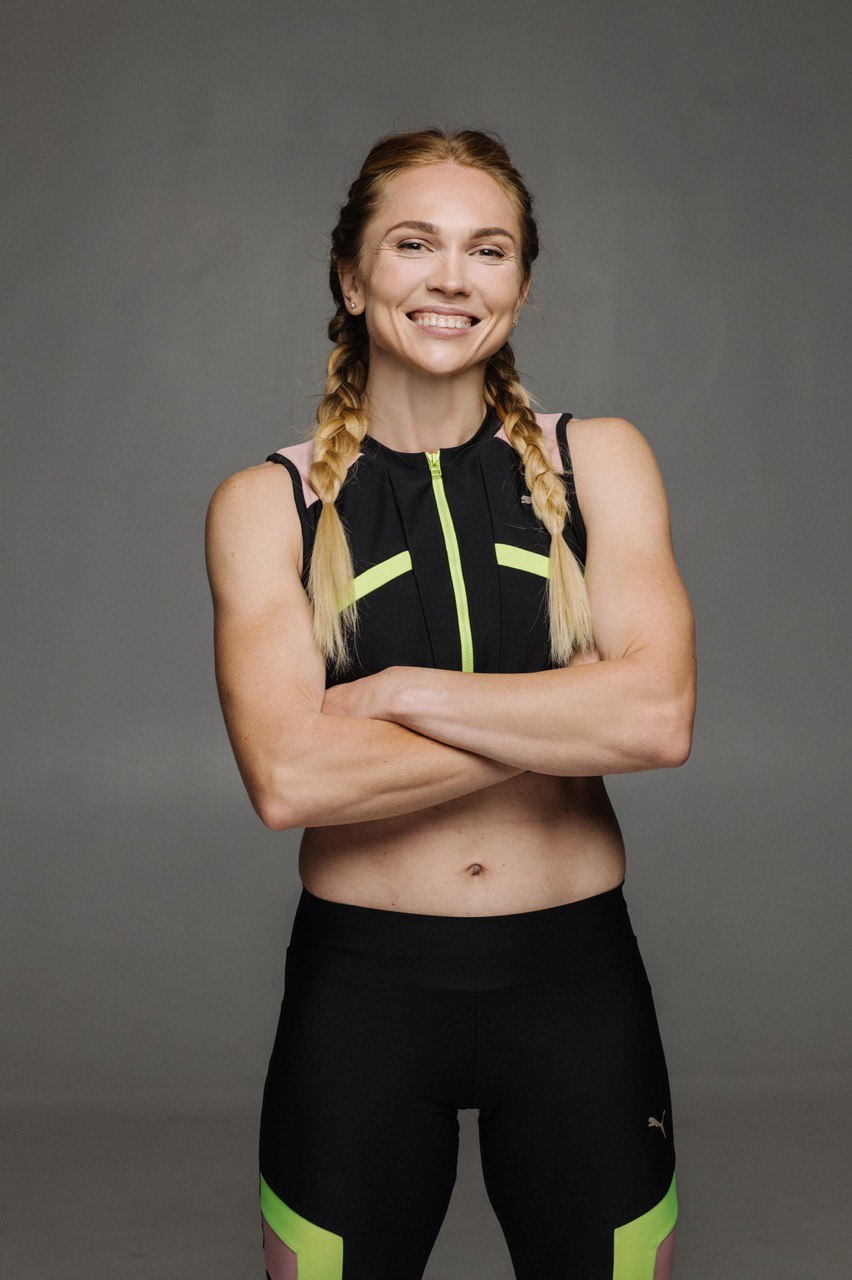
- Stuy in 2020

Personal information
- Born: February 3, 1988 (age 38)
- Height: 1.68 m (5 ft 6 in)
- Weight: 60 kg (132 lb)

Sport
- Country: Ukraine
- Sport: Athletics
- Event: 100 metres
Medal record
Olympic Games
Bronze medal – third place	2012 London	4 × 100 m relay
World Championships
Bronze medal – third place	2011 Daegu	4 × 100 m relay
European Championships
Silver medal – second place	2012 Helsinki	200 m
Silver medal – second place	2014 Zürich	4 × 400 m relay
European Team Championships
Gold medal – first place	2011 Stockholm	4x100 m relay
Gold medal – first place	2014 Braunschweig	4x400 m relay
Gold medal – first place	2015 Cheboksary	4x100 m relay
Bronze medal – third place	2017 Lille	4x100 m relay
Universiade
Gold medal – first place	2011 Shenzhen	4 × 100 m relay
Silver medal – second place	2011 Shenzhen	100 m

Khrystyna Stuy (Ukrainian: Христина Стуй; born 3 February 1988 in Uhryniv) is a Ukrainian sprint athlete who specializes in the 100 metres.

== Career ==
Stuy competed in the 4 × 100 metres relay at the 2009 World Championships without reaching the final. At the 2009 European U23 Championships, the Ukrainian team failed to finish the race.

At the 2012 Olympic Games in London, Stuy and her teammates Olesya Povh, Mariya Ryemyen, and Yelyzaveta Bryzhina won the bronze medals in the 4 × 100 metres relay by setting a new national record. Stuy also finished third in the 200 m quarterfinals at the 2012 Olympics.

Stuy's personal best times are 7.21 seconds in the 60 metres (indoor), achieved in March 2011 in Paris; and 11.22 seconds in the 100 metres.

Stuy was a student at the Lviv State College of Physical Education.
