= Mariya Ryemyen =

Ukrainian sprinter (born 1987)

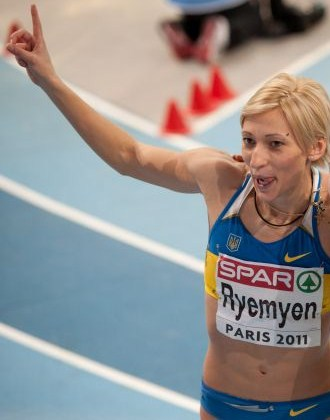

Personal information
- Born: August 2, 1987 (age 39) Makiivka, Ukrainian SSR, Soviet Union
- Height: 1.71 m (5 ft 7 1/2 in)
- Weight: 61 kg (134 lb)

Sport
- Country: Ukraine
- Sport: Track and field
- Event: 4 × 100 m relay
Medal record
Olympic Games
Bronze medal – third place	2012 London	4 × 100 m relay
World Championships
Bronze medal – third place	2011 Daegu	4 × 100 m relay
Diamond League Final
Third place	2013	200 m
European Championships
Gold medal – first place	2010 Barcelona	4 × 100 m relay
Gold medal – first place	2012 Helsinki	200 m
European Team Championships
Gold medal – first place	2011 Stockholm	200 m
Gold medal – first place	2011 Stockholm	4 × 100 m relay
Gold medal – first place	2013 Gateshead	200 m
Gold medal – first place	2013 Gateshead	4 × 100 m relay
Bronze medal – third place	2010 Bergen	4 × 100 m relay
European Indoor Championships
Gold medal – first place	2013 Gothenburg	60 m
Silver medal – second place	2011 Paris	60 m
Universiade
Gold medal – first place	2013 Kazan	4 × 100 m relay
Military World Games
Gold medal – first place	2011 Rio de Janeiro	100 m
Gold medal – first place	2011 Rio de Janeiro	200 m
Bronze medal – third place	2011 Rio de Janeiro	4 × 100 m relay

Mariya Ryemyen (Ukrainian: Марія Рємєнь; born 2 August 1987, Makiivka) is a Ukrainian sprint athlete who specializes in the 100 metres. Ryemyen was part (with Nataliya Pohrebnyak, Olesya Povh and Yelizaveta Bryzhina) of the Ukrainian women's 4 × 100 m that won gold during the 2010 European Athletics with 42.29 – the fastest time in the world that year.

== Career ==
She finished seventh at the 2009 European U23 Championships. She also competed at the 2010 World Indoor Championships without reaching the final.

In the 4 × 100 metres relay she competed at the 2009 World Championships without reaching the final. At the 2009 European U23 Championships the Ukrainian team failed to finish the race.

Her personal best times are 7.15 seconds in the 60 metres (indoor), achieved in March 2011 in Paris; and 11.27 seconds in the 100 metres, achieved in June 2011 in Montreuil-sous-Bois.

In 2011, she competed for Fenerbahçe Athletics in Turkey. At the 2012 Olympics Maria represented the Armed Forces of Ukraine and the sports club "Ukraina". At the 2012 Olympic Games in London she and her teammates Olesya Povh, Hrystyna Stuy and Yelizaveta Bryzghina took the bronze medals in the 4 × 100 metres relay by setting a new national record.

She served a two-year doping ban for the use of a prohibited substance, methandienone. The ban lasted from 10 January 2014 to 2 March 2016.
