= Viktoriya Pyatachenko =

Ukrainian sprinter

Personal information
- Nationality: Ukrainian
- Born: 7 May 1989 (age 37)

Sport
- Country: Ukraine
- Sport: Track and field
- Event: Sprint
Medal record
European Team Championships
Gold medal – first place	2013 Gateshead	4x100 m relay

Viktoriya Pyatachenko (Ukrainian: Вікторія П'ятаченко; born 7 May 1989) is a Ukrainian sprinter. She has qualified for 2016 Summer Olympics. She was 4th in the 200 m event at the 2012 European Championships.

== Personal bests ==
=== Outdoor ===
Event	Record	Wind	Venue	Date
100 metres	11.30	+0.5	Albi	15 August 2012
200 metres	22.68	+0.4	Yalta	6 June 2013

=== Indoor ===
Event	Record	Venue	Date
60 metres	7.31	Sumy	16 January 2015
60 metres	7.31	Sumy	18 February 2012
200 metres	24.27	Stockholm	17 February 2016
