= 2006 World Junior Championships in Athletics – Women's 4 × 100 metres relay =

The women's 4×100 metres relay event at the 2006 World Junior Championships in Athletics was held in Beijing, China, at Chaoyang Sports Centre on 19 and 20 August.

== Medalists ==
Gold	Jeneba Tarmoh; Alexandria Anderson; Elizabeth Olear; Gabby Mayo; United States
Silver	Johanna Danois; Emilie Gaydu; Joellie Baflan; Céline Distel; France
Bronze	Naffene Briscoe; Anastasia Le-Roy; Carrie Russell; Schillonie Calvert; Jamaica

== Results ==
=== Final ===
20 August

Rank	Nation	Competitors	Time	Notes
1st place, gold medalist(s)	United States	Jeneba Tarmoh; Alexandria Anderson; Elizabeth Olear; Gabby Mayo	43.49	
2nd place, silver medalist(s)	France	Johanna Danois; Emilie Gaydu; Joellie Baflan; Céline Distel	44.20	
3rd place, bronze medalist(s)	Jamaica	Naffene Briscoe; Anastasia Le-Roy; Carrie Russell; Schillonie Calvert	44.22	
4	Brazil	Josiane Valentim; Vanda Gomes; Tatiane Ferraz; Franciela Krasucki	44.45	
5	Poland	Paulina Siemieniako; Marika Popowicz; Ewelina Klocek; Agnieszka Ceglarek	44.70	
6	United Kingdom	Elaine O'Neill; Hayley Jones; Lucy Sargent; Asha Philip	44.74	
7	Russia	Irina Blazhenkina; Yuliya Kashina; Yekaterina Tatarintseva; Aleksandra Fedoriva	44.98	
8	China	Ma Xiaoyan; Liang Qiuping; Wang Jing; Chen Jue	45.07	

=== Heats ===
19 August

==== Heat 1 ====
Rank	Nation	Competitors	Time	Notes
1	France	Johanna Danois; Emilie Gaydu; Joellie Baflan; Céline Distel	44.02	Q
2	China	Ma Xiaoyan; Liang Qiuping; Wang Jing; Chen Jue	44.99	Q
3	Germany	Manuela Schwarz; Juliane Stolle; Anne-Kathrin Elbe; Julia Sutschet	45.10	
4	Norway	Ezinne Okparaebo; Folake Akinyemi; Malene Hjort; Thea Oppegaard	45.46	
5	Finland	Noora Pesola; Minna Laukka; Noora Hämäläinen; Oona Vilén	45.54	
6	Spain	Esther Arregui; Amparo Cotán; Andrea Díez; Silvia Riba	46.03	
7	Slovenia	Anja Puc; Tina Jures; Maja Petan; Maja Mihalinec	46.09	

==== Heat 2 ====
Rank	Nation	Competitors	Time	Notes
1	United States	Jeneba Tarmoh; Alexandria Anderson; Elizabeth Olear; Kenyanna Wilson	43.67	Q
2	United Kingdom	Elaine O'Neill; Hayley Jones; Lucy Sargent; Asha Philip	44.33	Q
3	Brazil	Josiane Valentim; Vanda Gomes; Tatiane Ferraz; Franciela Krasucki	44.43	q
4	Bahamas	T'Shonda Webb; Sheniqua Ferguson; Lanece Clarke; Nivea Smith	45.41	
5	South Africa	Arista Hefer; Wenda Theron; Claudine Jansen Van Reensburg; Constance Mkenku	46.90	
6	Belarus	Yekaterina Poplavskaya; Volha Lozhechnik; Maryna Boika; Hanna Tashpulatava	47.03	
7	Papua New Guinea	Vanessa Bilei; Toea Wisil; Cécilia Kumalamelame; Raphaela Baki	48.40	

==== Heat 3 ====
Rank	Nation	Competitors	Time	Notes
1	Jamaica	Kettiany Clarke; Anastasia Le-Roy; Carrie Russell; Schillonie Calvert	44.69	Q
2	Poland	Paulina Siemieniako; Marika Popowicz; Ewelina Klocek; Agnieszka Ceglarek	44.75	Q
3	Russia	Jana Lyadnova; Yuliya Kashina; Yekaterina Tatarintseva; Ksenia Vdovina	44.92	q
4	Canada	Whitney Wellington; Carline Muir; Phylicia George; Kimberley Hyacinthe	45.26	
5	Italy	Beatrice Alfinito; Jessica Paoletta; Audrey Alloh; Martina Giovanetti	45.57	
	Japan	Megumi Shimizu; Nao Okabe; Chisato Fukushima; Takarako Nakamura	DQ	
	Australia	Laura Verlinden; Kate Leitch; Jess Gulli; Angeline Blackburn	DNF	

== Participation ==
According to an unofficial count, 88 athletes from 21 countries participated in the event.

- Australia (4)
- Bahamas (4)
- Belarus (4)
- Brazil (4)
- Canada (4)
- China (4)
- Finland (4)
- France (4)
- Germany (4)
- Italy (4)
- Jamaica (5)
- Japan (4)
- Norway (4)
- Papua New Guinea (4)
- Poland (4)
- Russia (6)
- Slovenia (4)
- South Africa (4)
- Spain (4)
- United Kingdom (4)
- United States (5)
