= 2006 World Junior Championships in Athletics – Women's 200 metres =

The women's 200 metres event at the 2006 World Junior Championships in Athletics was held in Beijing, China, at Chaoyang Sports Centre on 17 and 18 August.

== Medalists ==
Gold	Tezdzhan Naimova; Bulgaria
Silver	Vanda Gomes; Brazil
Bronze	Ewelina Klocek; Poland

== Results ==
=== Final ===
18 August
Wind: -0.9 m/s

Rank	Name	Nationality	Time	Notes
1st place, gold medalist(s)	Tezdzhan Naimova	Bulgaria	22.99	
2nd place, silver medalist(s)	Vanda Gomes	Brazil	23.59	
3rd place, bronze medalist(s)	Ewelina Klocek	Poland	23.63	
4	Wang Jing	China	23.68	
5	Gabby Mayo	United States	23.84	
6	Anastasia Le-Roy	Jamaica	23.88	
7	Jeneba Tarmoh	United States	23.96	
8	Sheniqua Ferguson	Bahamas	24.03	

=== Semifinals ===
17 August

==== Semifinal 1 ====
Wind: -2.8 m/s

Rank	Name	Nationality	Time	Notes
1	Tezdzhan Naimova	Bulgaria	23.63	Q
2	Vanda Gomes	Brazil	24.14	Q
3	Kateřina Čechová	Czech Republic	24.34	
4	Takarako Nakamura	Japan	24.35	
5	Kimberley Hyacinthe	Canada	24.53	
6	Juliane Stolle	Germany	24.67	
7	Ksenia Vdovina	Russia	24.68	
8	Laura Verlinden	Australia	25.02	

==== Semifinal 2 ====
Wind: -2.0 m/s

Rank	Name	Nationality	Time	Notes
1	Gabby Mayo	United States	23.69	Q
2	Ewelina Klocek	Poland	23.72	Q
3	Sheniqua Ferguson	Bahamas	23.93	q
4	Chen Jue	China	23.94	
5	Franciela Krasucki	Brazil	24.14	
6	Racheal Nachula	Zambia	24.51	
7	Kunya Harnthong	Thailand	24.71	
	Justina Sule	Nigeria	DNS	

==== Semifinal 3 ====
Wind: -1.2 m/s

Rank	Name	Nationality	Time	Notes
1	Anastasia Le-Roy	Jamaica	23.57	Q
2	Wang Jing	China	23.78	Q
3	Jeneba Tarmoh	United States	23.91	q
4	Johanna Danois	France	23.99	
5	Marika Popowicz	Poland	24.00	
6	Amy Foster	Ireland	24.52	
7	Valentine Arrieta	Switzerland	24.93	
	Lina Grinčikaitė	Lithuania	DNS	

=== Heats ===
17 August

==== Heat 1 ====
Wind: -0.1 m/s

Rank	Name	Nationality	Time	Notes
1	Vanda Gomes	Brazil	24.04	Q
2	Juliane Stolle	Germany	24.12	Q
3	Chen Jue	China	24.12	Q
4	Ezinne Okparaebo	Norway	24.43	
5	Naffene Briscoe	Jamaica	24.53	
6	Minna Laukka	Finland	24.81	
7	Joëlle Golay	Switzerland	24.94	

==== Heat 2 ====
Wind: +0.1 m/s

Rank	Name	Nationality	Time	Notes
1	Jeneba Tarmoh	United States	23.90	Q
2	Wang Jing	China	24.04	Q
3	Kunya Harnthong	Thailand	24.30	Q
4	Constance Mkenku	South Africa	24.44	
5	Beatrice Alfinito	Italy	24.57	
6	Maria Gustafsson	Sweden	24.60	
7	Djénebou Dante	Mali	25.25	

==== Heat 3 ====
Wind: -0.9 m/s

Rank	Name	Nationality	Time	Notes
1	Sheniqua Ferguson	Bahamas	23.90	Q
2	Kimberley Hyacinthe	Canada	24.12	Q
3	Ksenia Vdovina	Russia	24.26	Q
4	Justina Sule	Nigeria	24.37	q
5	Malene Hjort	Norway	24.71	
6	Kate Leitch	Australia	25.00	
	Maja Mihalinec	Slovenia	DQ	

==== Heat 4 ====
Wind: -0.1 m/s

Rank	Name	Nationality	Time	Notes
1	Anastasia Le-Roy	Jamaica	23.86	Q
2	Franciela Krasucki	Brazil	24.09	Q
3	Marika Popowicz	Poland	24.14	Q
4	Laura Verlinden	Australia	24.41	q
5	Joellie Baflan	France	24.69	
6	Globine Mayova	Namibia	25.23	
7	Isabel Galander	Germany	25.36	

==== Heat 5 ====
Wind: 0.0 m/s

Rank	Name	Nationality	Time	Notes
1	Gabby Mayo	United States	23.62	Q
2	Ewelina Klocek	Poland	23.69	Q
3	Johanna Danois	France	23.93	Q
4	Amy Foster	Ireland	24.28	q
5	Inna Eftimova	Bulgaria	24.59	
6	Andrea Díez	Spain	25.04	
7	Charlene Attard	Malta	25.41	

==== Heat 6 ====
Wind: -1.5 m/s

Rank	Name	Nationality	Time	Notes
1	Tezdzhan Naimova	Bulgaria	23.60	Q
2	Lina Grinčikaitė	Lithuania	23.84	Q
3	Kateřina Čechová	Czech Republic	24.18	Q
4	Ebe Reier	Estonia	24.68	
5	Phylicia George	Canada	25.07	
6	Volha Lozhechnik	Belarus	25.32	
7	Megumi Shimizu	Japan	25.48	

==== Heat 7 ====
Wind: -0.7 m/s

Rank	Name	Nationality	Time	Notes
1	Takarako Nakamura	Japan	24.27	Q
2	Racheal Nachula	Zambia	24.37	Q
3	Valentine Arrieta	Switzerland	24.48	Q
4	Semoy Hackett	Trinidad and Tobago	24.59	
5	Wenda Theron	South Africa	24.74	
6	Sergine Kouanga	Cameroon	24.87	
7	Martina Giovanetti	Italy	24.99	
8	Andreea Ogrăzeanu	Romania	25.05	

== Participation ==
According to an unofficial count, 50 athletes from 35 countries participated in the event.

- Australia (2)
- Bahamas (1)
- Belarus (1)
- Brazil (2)
- Bulgaria (2)
- Cameroon (1)
- Canada (2)
- China (2)
- Czech Republic (1)
- Estonia (1)
- Finland (1)
- France (2)
- Germany (2)
- Ireland (1)
- Italy (2)
- Jamaica (2)
- Japan (2)
- Lithuania (1)
- Mali (1)
- Malta (1)
- Namibia (1)
- Nigeria (1)
- Norway (2)
- Poland (2)
- Romania (1)
- Russia (1)
- Slovenia (1)
- South Africa (2)
- Spain (1)
- Sweden (1)
- Switzerland (2)
- Thailand (1)
- Trinidad and Tobago (1)
- United States (2)
- Zambia (1)
