= Franciela Krasucki =

Brazilian sprinter (born 1988)

Personal information
- Full name: Franciela das Graças Krasucki Davide
- Nationality: Brazil
- Born: 26 April 1988 (age 38) Valinhos, Brazil
- Height: 1.68 m (5 ft 6 in)
- Weight: 59 kg (130 lb)

Sport
- Sport: Athletics
- Event(s): Sprinting; 4 × 100m relay
Medal record
Women's athletics
Representing Brazil
Pan American Games
Gold medal – first place	2011 Guadalajara	4 × 100 m relay
Military World Games
Gold medal – first place	2011 Rio de Janeiro	4 × 100 m relay
Gold medal – first place	2015 Mungyeong	4 × 100 m relay
- Updated on 8 October 2015

Franciela das Graças Krasucki (born 26 April 1988) is a Brazilian sprinter.

== Career ==
She competed for the Brazilian team in the 4 × 100 metres relay at the 2012 Summer Olympics; the team set a South American record with a time of 42.55 in Round 1, then placed seventh in the final with a time of 42.91.

At the 2013 World Championships in Moscow, the team composed by Ana Cláudia Lemos, Evelyn dos Santos, Franciela Krasucki and Rosângela Santos broke the South American record in the semifinals of the women's 4x100m metres relay, with a time of 42.29 seconds. But, without official explanation, the CBAT (Brazilian Athletics Confederation) held an athlete change to the final, putting Vanda Gomes instead of Rosângela Santos, to close the race. In the final, Brazil came second, almost tied with Jamaica and with great possibility to win the silver medal, and knock the South American record when, at the last exchange between Krasucki and Vanda, the baton fell eliminating the Brazilian team.

In February 2014, in São Caetano do Sul, she twice broke the South American record in the 60 metres, with a time of 7.23 seconds in the semifinals, and 7.19 in the final. The previous South American record holder was Esmeralda Garcia Freitas, established on March 13, 1981, in Pocatello, United States, with a time of 7.26.

== Personal life ==
On January 21, 2012, she married 800 metres runner Kléberson Davide in Valinhos, São Paulo state.

== Personal bests ==
- 100 m: 11.13 (wind: -0.7 m/s) – (Brazil) São Paulo, 6 June 2013
- 200 m: 22.76 (wind: -0.1 m/s) – (Brazil) São Paulo, 9 June 2013

== International competitions ==
Year	Competition	Venue	Position	Event	Notes
Representing Brazil
2002	South American Youth Championships	Asunción, Paraguay	5th	200 m	25.54 s (+3.3 m/s) w
2003	South American Junior Championships	Guayaquil, Ecuador	3rd	100 m	11.77 (+0.0 m/s)
2003	South American Junior Championships	Guayaquil, Ecuador	6th	200 m	24.65
2003	South American Junior Championships	Guayaquil, Ecuador	3rd	4×100 m relay	46.92
2003	World Youth Championships	Sherbrooke, Canada	4th	100 m	11.61 (+1.8 m/s)
2003	Pan American Junior Championships	Bridgetown, Barbados	7th	100 m	11.85 (+0.1 m/s)
2003	Pan American Junior Championships	Bridgetown, Barbados	4th	4×100 m relay	46.02
2004	World Junior Championships	Grosseto, Italy	16th (sf)	100 m	11.86 (-0.1 m/s)
2004	World Junior Championships	Grosseto, Italy	13th (sf)	200 m	24.22 (+0.7 m/s)
2004	South American Youth Championships	Guayaquil, Ecuador	1st	100 m	11.43 s (+2.7 m/s) w
2004	South American Youth Championships	Guayaquil, Ecuador	1st	200 m	23.92 s (+3.2 m/s) w
2004	South American Youth Championships	Guayaquil, Ecuador	1st	4 × 100 m relay	46.41 s
2004	South American Youth Championships	Guayaquil, Ecuador	1st	1000 m Medley relay	2:11.6 min
2005	World Youth Championships	Marrakesh, Morocco	4th	100 m	11.45 (-0.1 m/s)
2005	World Youth Championships	Marrakesh, Morocco	3rd	Medley relay	2:06.60
2005	South American Junior Championships	Rosario, Argentina	1st	100 m	11.39 (+1.6 m/s)
2005	South American Junior Championships	Rosario, Argentina	1st	200 m	23.54 w (+2.2 m/s)
2005	South American Junior Championships	Rosario, Argentina	1st	4×100 m relay	45.25
2006	Ibero-American Championships	Ponce, Puerto Rico	1st	100 m	11.61 (-1.1 m/s)
2006	Ibero-American Championships	Ponce, Puerto Rico	1st	4×100 m relay	44.49
2006	World Junior Championships	Beijing, China	7th	100 m	11.71 (-0.8 m/s)
2006	World Junior Championships	Beijing, China	12th (sf)	200 m	24.14 (-2.0 m/s)
2006	World Junior Championships	Beijing, China	4th	4×100 m relay	44.45
2006	Lusophony Games	Macau	2nd	100 m	11.77 (-0.1 m/s)
2006	Lusophony Games	Macau	2nd	200 m	24.12 (-0.4 m/s)
2006	Lusophony Games	Macau	1st	4×100 m relay	45.58
2007	Pan American Junior Championships	São Paulo, Brazil	3rd (h)	200 m	24.11 (+0.9 m/s)
2007	Pan American Junior Championships	São Paulo, Brazil	2nd	4×100 m relay	43.98
2008	Central American and Caribbean Championships	Cali, Colombia	3rd (Note: Running as guests)	4×100 m relay	43.69
2008	South American U23 Championships	Lima, Peru	1st	4x100m relay	45.76
2010	South American Under-23 Championships / South American Games	Medellín, Colombia	6th	100 m	12.27 (+1.5 m/s)
2010	South American Under-23 Championships / South American Games	Medellín, Colombia	1st	4×100 m relay	44.47
2011	South American Championships	Buenos Aires, Argentina	2nd	4×100 m relay	44.56
2011	Military World Games	Rio de Janeiro, Brazil	6th	100 m	11.74 (+0.0 m/s)
2011	Military World Games	Rio de Janeiro, Brazil	1st	4×100 m relay	43.73
2011	World Championships	Daegu, South Korea	7th	4×100 m relay	43.10
2011	Pan American Games	Guadalajara, Mexico	1st	4×100 m relay	42.85
2012	Olympic Games	London, United Kingdom	7th	4×100 m relay	42.91
2013	South American Championships	Cartagena, Colombia	2nd	100 m	11.27 (+0.1 m/s)
2013	South American Championships	Cartagena, Colombia	1st	4×100 m relay	43.37
2013	World Championships	Moscow, Russia	15th (sf)	100 m	11.34 (-0.4 m/s)
2013	World Championships	Moscow, Russia	23rd (h)	200 m	23.20 (+0.0 m/s)
2013	World Championships	Moscow, Russia	4th (h)	4×100 m relay	42.29 (Note: Did not finish in the final)
2014	World Indoor Championships	Sopot, Poland	17th (sf)	60 m	7.31
2014	South American Games	Santiago, Chile	3rd	100 m	11.67 (-0.1 m/s)
2014	Ibero-American Championships	São Paulo, Brazil	3rd	100 m	11.43 (0.0 m/s)
2014	Ibero-American Championships	São Paulo, Brazil	1st	200 m	23.41 (+0.2 m/s)
2014	Ibero-American Championships	São Paulo, Brazil	1st	4×100 m relay	42.92
2015	World Championships	Beijing, China	9th (h)	4×100 m relay	43.15
2016	Ibero-American Championships	Rio de Janeiro, Brazil	7th	100 m	11.51
2016	Olympic Games	Rio de Janeiro, Brazil	47th (h)	100 m	11.67
2016	Olympic Games	Rio de Janeiro, Brazil	–	4×100 m relay	DQ
2017	South American Championships	Asunción, Paraguay	1st	4×100 m relay	43.12
2017	World Championships	London, United Kingdom	7th	4×100 m relay	42.63
2019	World Relays	Yokohama, Japan	4th	4 × 100 m relay	43.75
2019	Pan American Games	Lima, Peru	15th (h)	100 m	11.87
