= Rosângela Santos =

Brazilian sprinter (born 1990)

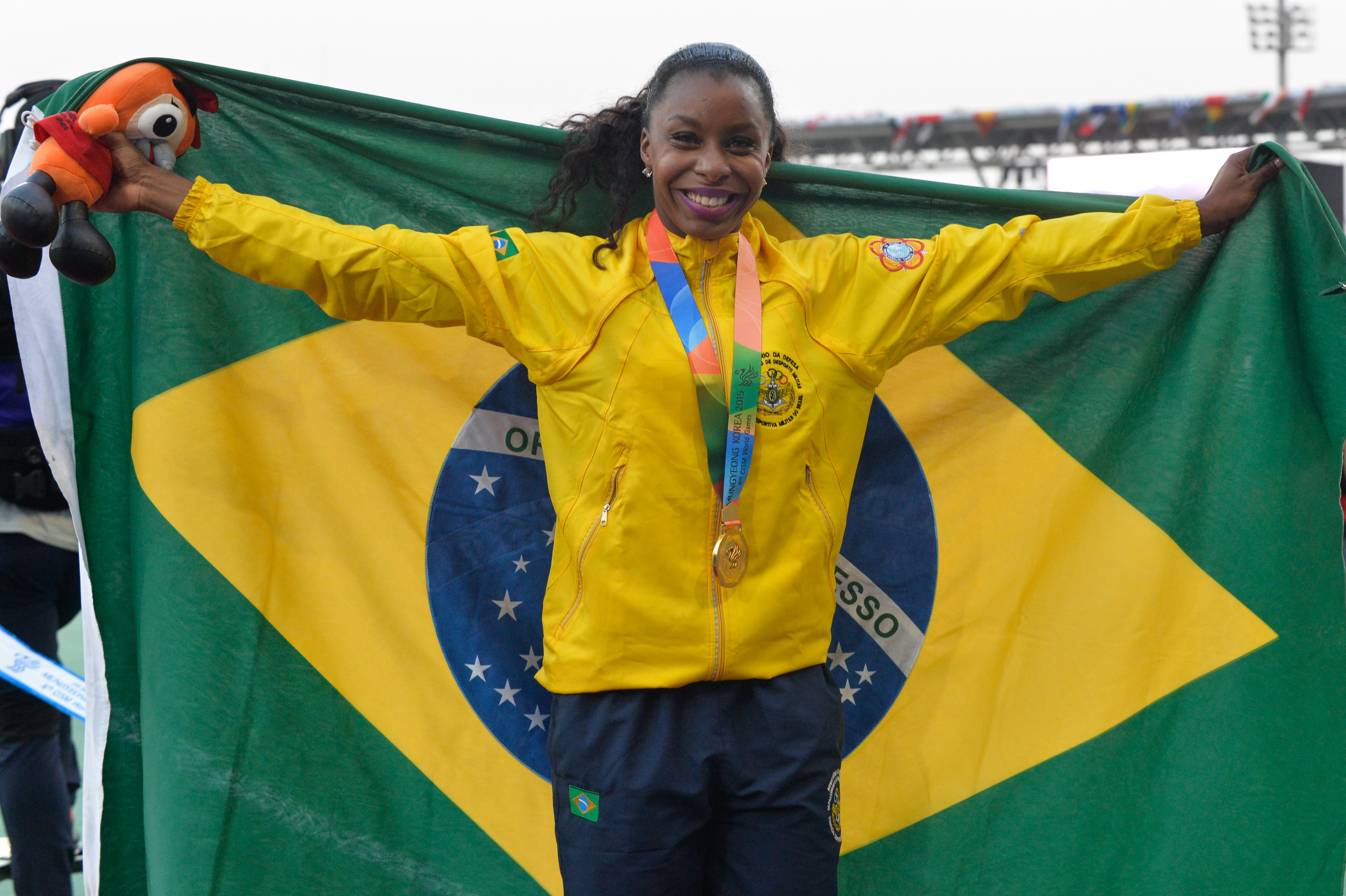
- Rosângela Santos at the 2015 Military World Games

Personal information
- Full name: Rosângela Cristina (de) Oliveira Santos
- Nationality: Brazil
- Born: December 20, 1990 (age 35) Washington, D.C., United States
- Height: 1.66 m (5 ft 5 1/2 in)
- Weight: 64 kg (141 lb)

Sport
- Sport: Athletics
- Event: 100 metres

Achievements and titles
- Personal bests: 100 m: 10.91 s (2017); 200 m: 22.77 s (2015)
Medal record
Women's athletics
Representing Brazil
Olympic Games
Bronze medal – third place	2008 Beijing	4 × 100 m relay
Pan American Games
Gold medal – first place	2011 Guadalajara	100 m
Gold medal – first place	2011 Guadalajara	4 × 100 m relay
Gold medal – first place	2019 Lima	4 × 100 m relay
Ibero-American Championships
Gold medal – first place	2012 Barquisimeto	100 m
Gold medal – first place	2012 Barquisimeto	4 × 100 m relay
Pan American Junior Championships
Silver medal – second place	2007 São Paulo	100 m
Silver medal – second place	2007 São Paulo	4 × 100 m relay
Military World Games
Gold medal – first place	2015 Mungyeong	100 m
Gold medal – first place	2015 Mungyeong	4 × 100 m relay
Bronze medal – third place	2015 Mungyeong	200 m
- Updated on 8 October 2015

Rosângela Cristina Oliveira Santos (born December 20, 1990) is an American-born Brazilian track and field sprint athlete.

== Career ==
Santos represented Brazil at the 2008 Summer Olympics in Beijing. She competed at the 4 × 100 metres relay together with Lucimar de Moura, Thaissa Presti and Rosemar Coelho Neto. In their first-round heat, they placed third behind Belgium and Great Britain but in front of Nigeria. Their time of 43.38 seconds was the fifth time overall out of sixteen participating nations. With this result, they qualified for the final in which they sprinted to a time of 43.14 seconds and the fourth place behind Nigeria, missing out on the bronze medal by 0.10 seconds. However, in 2016, the IOC stripped Russia of its gold medal due to doping, meaning Rosângela and her teammates inherited the bronze medal.

At Daegu 2011, Rosângela Santos went to the 4 × 100 m final, ranking eighth - with a new South American record (42.92) at the preliminary.

At the 2011 Pan American Games, in Guadalajara, she won the gold medal in the 100 m, beating her personal record with a time of 11.22 seconds. She was only the second Brazilian in history to win this race in Pan Am Games. She also won the 4 × 100 meters relay alongside Vanda Gomes, Franciela Krasucki and Ana Claudia Lemos, with a time of 42.85, breaking the South American record.

At the 2012 Summer Olympics, Rosângela reached the semifinals of the 100 m, with a mark of 11.07 s, which narrowly not accepted as a South American record due to +2,2 wind (the maximum allowed for approval of record is +2.0). In the semifinal, she came in 3rd place in her heat (losing to Carmelita Jeter and Veronica Campbell-Brown, who advanced to the final, and won silver and bronze medals), in a time of 11.17 mark, ranking 12th overall. She was the first Brazilian woman to achieve an Olympic spot in the semifinals of this event.

Still in London, the Brazilian 4 × 100 m relay women's team, composed of Ana Cláudia Lemos, Franciela Krasucki, Evelyn dos Santos, and Rosângela Santos broke the South American record in the qualifying of the race, with a time of 42.55, and went to the final in sixth place. In the final, the Brazilian relay ran a time of 42.91 and finished 7th.

At the 2013 World Championships in Moscow, the team composed by Ana Cláudia Lemos, Evelyn dos Santos, Franciela Krasucki and Rosângela Santos broke the South American record in the semifinals of the women's 4 × 100 m metres relay, with a time of 42.29 seconds. But, strangely and without official explanation, the CBAT (Brazilian Athletics Confederation) made a bizarre athlete change to the final lineup, putting Vanda Gomes (who had never run the relay) into the team instead of Rosângela Santos. More than that, they placed her on the anchor leg. In the final, Brazil came second, almost tied with Jamaica and with great possibility to win the silver medal and break the South American record when, at the last baton exchange, Vanda, who had been placed "in the line of fire" in a World Championships final without sufficient training to receive the baton, let the baton fall.

At the 2017 World Championships in London, Rosângela became the first Brazilian female sprinter ever to race 100 m in less than 11 seconds, clocking 10.91 in the semifinal to bag a new national and South American record to the distance. She placed 7th in the finals.

She has dual citizenship, American and Brazilian.

== Personal bests ==
- 100 m: 10.91 s (wind: -0.2 m/s) – London, United Kingdom, 6 August 2017
- 200 m: 22.77 s (wind: +1.7 m/s) – Birmingham, United Kingdom, 7 June 2015
- 4 × 100 m: 42.29 s – Moscow, Russia, 18 August 2013

== International competitions ==
Year	Competition	Venue	Position	Event	Notes
Representing Brazil
2006	South American Youth Championships	Caracas, Venezuela	2nd	100 m	11.95 (+0.4 m/s)
2006	South American Youth Championships	Caracas, Venezuela	1st	4 × 100 m relay	46.20
2006	South American Youth Championships	Caracas, Venezuela	1st	1000 m medley relay	2:12.03
2008	World Junior Championships	Bydgoszcz, Poland	4th	100 m	11.63 (-0.6 m/s)
2008	World Junior Championships	Bydgoszcz, Poland	3rd	4 × 100 m relay	44.61
2008	South American U23 Championships	Lima, Peru	1st	100 m	11.91 (-2.5 m/s)
2008	South American U23 Championships	Lima, Peru	1st	4 × 100 m relay	45.76
2008	Olympic Games	Beijing, China	3rd	4 × 100 m relay	43.14
2011	Universiade	Shenzhen, China	5th	100 m	11.48
2011	World Championships	Daegu, South Korea	24th (sf)	100 m	11.61
2011	World Championships	Daegu, South Korea	6th	4 × 100 m relay	43.10
2011	Pan American Games	Guadalajara, Mexico	1st	100 m	11.22
2011	Pan American Games	Guadalajara, Mexico	1st	4 × 100 m relay	42.85
2012	Ibero-American Championships	Barquisimeto, Venezuela	1st	100 m	11.41
2012	Ibero-American Championships	Barquisimeto, Venezuela	1st	4 × 100 m	43.90
2012	Olympic Games	London, United Kingdom	12th (sf)	100 m	11.17
2012	Olympic Games	London, United Kingdom	7th	4 × 100 m	42.91
2013	South American Championships	Cartagena, Colombia	–	200 m	DNS^{1}
2013	World Championships	Moscow, Russia	–	4 × 100 m	DNF^{2}
2014	World Relays	Nassau, Bahamas	7th	4 × 100 m	43.67
2014	Ibero-American Championships	São Paulo, Brazil	1st	4 × 100 m	42.92 CR
2015	World Relays	Nassau, Bahamas	6th	4 × 100 m	42.92
2015	Pan American Games	Toronto, Canada	4th	100 m	11.04
2015	Pan American Games	Toronto, Canada	4th	4 × 100 m	43.01
2015	World Championships	Beijing, China	12th (sf)	100 m	11.07
2015	World Championships	Beijing, China	13th (sf)	200 m	22.87
2015	World Championships	Beijing, China	9th (h)	4 × 100 m relay	43.15
2015	Military World Games	Mungyeong, South Korea	1st	100 m	11.17 GR
2015	Military World Games	Mungyeong, South Korea	3rd	200 m	23.38
2015	Military World Games	Mungyeong, South Korea	1st	4 × 100 m relay	43.87
2016	World Indoor Championships	Portland, United States	11th (sf)	60 m	7.20
2016	Ibero-American Championships	Rio de Janeiro, Brazil	1st	100 m	11.24
2016	Olympic Games	Rio de Janeiro, Brazil	18th (sf)	100 m	11.23
2016	Olympic Games	Rio de Janeiro, Brazil	–	4 × 100 m relay	DQ
2017	World Relays	Nassau, Bahamas	8th (h)	4 × 100 m relay	44.20^{3}
2017	South American Championships	Asunción, Paraguay	2nd (h)	100 m	11.08 (w)^{4}
2017	South American Championships	Asunción, Paraguay	6th (h)	200 m	23.39 (w)^{5}
2017	South American Championships	Asunción, Paraguay	1st	4 × 100 m relay	43.12
2017	World Championships	London, United Kingdom	7th	100 m	11.06
2017	World Championships	London, United Kingdom	20th (h)	200 m	23.34^{6}
2017	World Championships	London, United Kingdom	7th	4 × 100 m relay	42.63
2018	World Indoor Championships	Birmingham, United Kingdom	24th (h)	60 m	7.32
2018	South American Games	Cochabamba, Bolivia	6th	100 m	11.39
2018	Ibero-American Championships	Trujillo, Peru	3rd	100 m	11.44
2018	Ibero-American Championships	Trujillo, Peru	2nd	200 m	23.92
2019	Pan American Games	Lima, Peru	1st	4 × 100 m relay	43.04
2019	World Championships	Doha, Qatar	26th (h)	100 m	11.32
2019	World Championships	Doha, Qatar	–	4 × 100 m relay	DQ
2020	South American Indoor Championships	Cochabamba, Bolivia	1st	60 m	7.34
2021	World Relays	Chorzów, Poland	–	4 × 100 m relay	DQ
2021	Olympic Games	Tokyo, Japan	28th (h)	100 m	11.33
2021	Olympic Games	Tokyo, Japan	11th (h)	4 × 100 m relay	43.15
2022	World Indoor Championships	Belgrade, Serbia	–	60 m	DQ
2023	South American Championships	São Paulo, Brazil	1st	4 × 100 m relay	43.47
2023	World Championships	Budapest, Hungary	15th (h)	4 × 100 m relay	43.46

^{1}Participated in the heats, but did not start in the final
^{2}Participated only in the heats, team did not finish in the final
^{3}Did not finish in the final
^{4}Disqualified in the final
^{5}Did not start in the final
^{6}Disqualified in the semifinals
