= 2004 South American Youth Championships in Athletics =

XVII South American Youth Championships in Athletics
- Dates: September 25–26
- Host city: Guayaquil, Ecuador
- Venue: Estadio Modelo
- Level: Youth
- Events: 42
- Participation: about 259 athletes from 12 nations

The 17th South American Youth Championships in Athletics were held at the Estadio Modelo in Guayaquil, Ecuador from September 25–26, 2004.

== Medal summary ==
Medal winners are published for boys and girls. Complete results can be found on the "World Junior Athletics History" website.

=== Men ===
Event	Gold		Silver		Bronze	
100 metres (wind: +1.9 m/s)	Nicolás Piorno (ARG)	10.68	Nicoll Navas (COL)	10.83	Diego Vuyk (PAR)	10.85
200 metres (wind: +2.6 m/s)	José Martins (BRA)	21.82 w	Jorge dos Santos (BRA)	22.01 w	Nicolás Piorno (ARG)	22.05 w
400 metres	Dimas de Lima (BRA)	49.14	Geraldo Ramírez (PER)	49.42	Esteban Lucero (ECU)	49.52
800 metres	Cristian Crobat (ARG)	1:53.6	Geraldo Ramírez (PER)	1:55.4	Rodrigo Navarro (PER)	1:55.8
1500 metres	Luís Barboza (BRA)	3:56.9	Antônio Miranda (BRA)	3:58.1	Cristian Crobat (ARG)	3:59.4
3000 metres	Joilson da Silva (BRA)	8:33.4	Mario Bazán (PER)	8:33.6	Martín Ñancucheo (ARG)	8:42.3
2000 metres steeplechase	José Peña (VEN)	5:52.2	Mario Bazán (PER)	5:58.9	Ruguevam da Silva (BRA)	5:59.8
110 metres hurdles (wind: +1.2 m/s)	Jonathan Davis (VEN)	13.94	Jorge McFarlane (PER)	14.28	Rivamar Alexandre (BRA)	14.38
400 metres hurdles	Esteban Lucero (ECU)	52.88	Jangleson Dornelas (BRA)	54.15	Jean Pierre Málaga (PER)	54.73
High jump	Alberth Bravo (VEN)	2.01	Luis Salazar (COL)	2.01	Fermín Gándara (ARG); Maycon Volpato (BRA)	1.95
Pole vault	Germán Chiaraviglio (ARG)	5.20	Tomás González (CHI)	4.40	Renato Oliveira (BRA)	4.20
Long jump	Marcos Ibargüen (COL)	7.37w	Cleiton Sabino (BRA)	7.15	Emerson Roth (ARG)	7.03
Triple jump	Ronald Belisario (VEN)	15.40	Marcos Ibargüen (COL)	15.34	Hugo Chila (ECU)	15.30
Shot put	Raoni de Morais (BRA)	17.78	Gertymilluson Maciel (BRA)	17.43	Luigi D'Amato (VEN)	17.21
Discus throw	Guillermo Bittor (ARG)	54.62	Jorge Cuevas (CHI)	52.95	Jorge Fonck (CHI)	51.41
Hammer throw	Juan Charadía (ARG)	63.95	Gary Léon (ECU)	60.32	Sergio Vidal (ARG)	59.20
Javelin throw	Víctor Fatecha (PAR)	70.69	Adalberto da Silva (BRA)	61.43	François Pouzet (CHI)	61.29
Octathlon	Luiz Alberto de Araújo (BRA)	5966	Orlando Bomfin (BRA)	5712	Daniel Morada (ARG)	5322
10,000 metres track walk	Herbert de Almeida (BRA)	47:08.17	Mauricio Arteaga (ECU)	47:48.58	Robinson Vivar (ECU)	48:19.07
4 × 100 metres relay	Brazil; Jorge dos Santos; Raoni Amaral; Bruno de Barros; José Martins	42.42	Ecuador; Juan Venegas; Pedro Astudillo; Marcelo Bucheli; Byron Casfort	42.63	Colombia; Marco Ibargüen; José Guzmán; Lindon Aguache; Nicoll Navas	42.65
1000 metres medley relay	Brazil; Jonas Silva; José Martins; Jorge dos Santos; Dimas de Lima	1:55.7	Ecuador; Luis Gárate; Marcelo Bucheli; Juan Venegas; Esteban Lucero	1:57.8	Chile; Tomás González; Cristián Pérez; Andres Gazmuri; Pablo Navarrete	1:58.0

=== Women ===
Event	Gold		Silver		Bronze	
100 metres (wind: +2.7 m/s)	Franciela Krasucki (BRA)	11.43 w	Yomara Hinestroza (COL)	11.67 w	Dianne Munroe (GUY)	11.90 w
200 metres (wind: +3.2 m/s)	Franciela Krasucki (BRA)	23.92 w	Yomara Hinestroza (COL)	24.35 w	Jessica Perea (ECU)	24.51 w
400 metres	Alejandra Idrobo (COL)	55.74	Deysi Tenorio (ECU)	56.11	Nicole Manríquez (CHI)	56.18
800 metres	Jessica Quispe (PER)	2:10.5	Diana Armas (ECU)	2:10.8	Karina Cedeño (ECU)	2:11.8
1500 metres	Jessica Quispe (PER)	4:21.6	Rocío Huillca (PER)	4:28.5	Yulibeth Jiménez (VEN)	4:29.8
3000 metres	Jessica Quispe (PER)	9:29.8	Michele das Chagas (BRA)	9:55.9	Militza Saucedo (BOL)	10:00
2000 metres steeplechase	Sabine Heitling (BRA)	6:34.7	Yulibeth Jiménez (VEN)	6:48.9	Tatiane da Silva (BRA)	7:08.5
100 metres hurdles (wind: +0.8 m/s)	Gisele de Albuquerque (BRA)	14.02	Daiana Sturtz (ARG)	14.52	Eliecith Palacios (COL)	14.57
400 metres hurdles	Wanessa Zavolski (BRA)	62.5	Karina Caicedo (ECU)	63.5	Gisele Cruz (BRA)	65.3
High jump	Tamara Maass (CHI)	1.74	Aline Santos (BRA)	1.74	Verónica Davis (VEN)	1.71
Pole vault	Keisa Monterola (VEN)	3.80	Valeria Chiaraviglio (ARG)	3.60	Eliana Martínez (COL)	3.30
Long jump	Kauiza Venâncio (BRA)	5.67	Vianka Vargas (BOL)	5.67	Gisele de Albuquerque (BRA)	5.64
Triple jump	Karla de Souza (BRA)	12.44	Verónica Davis (VEN)	12.38	Vianka Vargas (BOL)	11.83
Shot put	Rocío Comba (ARG)	14.65	Natalia Ducó (CHI)	12.64	Viviani da Silva (BRA)	12.10
Discus throw	Rocío Comba (ARG)	43.30	Aixa Middleton (PAN)	39.17	Noelia Brezzo (ARG)	38.98
Hammer throw	Marynna de Jesus (BRA)	51.10	Gisela Cardozo (BRA)	49.92	Wilmary González (VEN)	45.98
Javelin throw	Jucilene de Lima (BRA)	48.04	Tatiane Ramos (BRA)	41.61	Valeria Ponce (PER)	40.58
Heptathlon	Tamiris Delfino (BRA)	4714	Tatiane Ramos (BRA)	4538	Madeleine Rondón (VEN)	4491
5000 metres track walk	Johana Ordóñez (ECU)	24:36.6	Ingrid Hernández (COL)	25:06.4	Pilar Rayo (COL)	25:26.7
4 × 100 metres relay	Brazil; Josiane Valentim; Tatiane Ferraz; Franciela Krasucki; Natassia Bourg	46.41	Ecuador; Lorena Mina; Karina Caicedo; Jessica Perea; Jazmin Caicedo	46.88	Colombia; Yomara Hinestroza; Jazmin Córdoba; Alejandra Idrobo; Eliecith Palacios	47.29
1000 metres Medley relay	Brazil; Franciela Krasucki; Fernanda Aprigio; Gisele Cruz; Kamila Miranda	2:11.6	Ecuador; Erika Chávez; Daisy Tenorio; Jessica Perea; Lorena Mina	2:11.8	Colombia; Alejandra Idrobo; Jazmin Córdoba; Eliecith Palacios; Yomara Hinestroza	2:13.2

== Medal table (unofficial) ==
* Host nation (Ecuador)

Rank	Nation	Gold	Silver	Bronze	Total
1	Brazil (BRA)	21	12	8	41
2	Argentina (ARG)	7	2	8	17
3	Venezuela (VEN)	5	2	5	12
4	Peru (PER)	3	6	3	12
5	Ecuador (ECU)*	2	9	5	16
6	Colombia (COL)	2	6	6	14
7	Chile (CHI)	1	3	4	8
8	Paraguay (PAR)	1	0	1	2
9	Bolivia (BOL)	0	1	2	3
10	Panama (PAN)	0	1	0	1
11	Guyana (GUY)	0	0	1	1
Totals (11 entries)		42	42	43	127

== Trophies ==
Final scoring for the three best countries were published.

=== Overall team ===
The host country is highlighted in lavender blue

Rank	Nation	Points
1	Brazil	437
2	Ecuador	173
3	Argentina	161

=== Individual ===
The trophies for the most outstanding performance were awarded to Jonathan Davis (Venezuela) and Franciela Krasucki (Brazil). Jessica Quispe (Peru) gained the trophy for the most improved athlete.

== Participation (unofficial) ==
Detailed result lists can be found on the "World Junior Athletics History" website. An unofficial count yields the number of about 259 athletes from about 12 countries:

- Argentina (28)
- Bolivia (4)
- Brazil (61)
- Chile (33)
- Colombia (27)
- Ecuador (49)
- Guyana (5)
- Panama (3)
- Paraguay (5)
- Peru (24)
- Uruguay (2)
- Venezuela (18)
