= 2006 World Junior Championships in Athletics – Women's 100 metres =

The women's 100 metres event at the 2006 World Junior Championships in Athletics was held in Beijing, China, at Chaoyang Sports Centre on 15 and 16 August.

== Medalists ==
Gold	Tezdzhan Naimova; Bulgaria
Silver	Gabby Mayo; United States
Bronze	Carrie Russell; Jamaica

== Results ==
=== Final ===
16 August
Wind: -0.8 m/s

Rank	Name	Nationality	Time	Notes
1st place, gold medalist(s)	Tezdzhan Naimova	Bulgaria	11.28	
2nd place, silver medalist(s)	Gabby Mayo	United States	11.42	
3rd place, bronze medalist(s)	Carrie Russell	Jamaica	11.42	
4	Asha Philip	United Kingdom	11.48	
5	Alexandria Anderson	United States	11.49	
6	Lina Grinčikaitė	Lithuania	11.49	
7	Franciela Krasucki	Brazil	11.71	
8	Céline Distel	France	11.75	

=== Semifinals ===
15 August

==== Semifinal 1 ====
Wind: -0.9 m/s

Rank	Name	Nationality	Time	Notes
1	Carrie Russell	Jamaica	11.59	Q
2	Lina Grinčikaitė	Lithuania	11.68	Q
3	Asha Philip	United Kingdom	11.68	q
4	Gabby Mayo	United States	11.72	q
5	Martina Giovanetti	Italy	11.98	
6	Jana Lyadnova	Russia	12.05	
7	Yomara Hinestroza	Colombia	12.08	
8	Oona Vilén	Finland	12.11	

==== Semifinal 2 ====
Wind: -0.6 m/s

Rank	Name	Nationality	Time	Notes
1	Alexandria Anderson	United States	11.51	Q
2	Céline Distel	France	11.69	Q
3	Schillonie Calvert	Jamaica	11.74	
4	Ezinne Okparaebo	Norway	11.83	
5	Justina Sule	Nigeria	11.89	
6	Julia Sutschet	Germany	11.92	
7	Constance Mkenku	South Africa	11.95	
8	Marika Popowicz	Poland	11.96	

==== Semifinal 3 ====
Wind: -1.8 m/s

Rank	Name	Nationality	Time	Notes
1	Tezdzhan Naimova	Bulgaria	11.53	Q
2	Franciela Krasucki	Brazil	11.72	Q
3	Natalya Pogrebnyak	Ukraine	11.81	
4	Emilie Gaydu	France	11.91	
5	Sheniqua Ferguson	Bahamas	11.92	
6	Sergine Kouanga	Cameroon	11.97	
7	Chisato Fukushima	Japan	12.11	
8	Gladys Nwaubani	Nigeria	12.25	

=== Heats ===
15 August

==== Heat 1 ====
Wind: +0.6 m/s

Rank	Name	Nationality	Time	Notes
1	Alexandria Anderson	United States	11.35	Q
2	Carrie Russell	Jamaica	11.36	Q
3	Liang Qiuping	China	11.87	
4	Inna Eftimova	Bulgaria	11.98	
5	Wenda Theron	South Africa	12.12	
6	Sina Teresa	Angola	13.04	
7	Agathe Julien	Monaco	14.09	

==== Heat 2 ====
Wind: +0.4 m/s

Rank	Name	Nationality	Time	Notes
1	Schillonie Calvert	Jamaica	11.63	Q
2	Céline Distel	France	11.64	Q
3	Laura Verlinden	Australia	11.88	
4	Semoy Hackett	Trinidad and Tobago	11.94	
5	Thea Oppegaard	Norway	11.96	
6	Paulette Zang-Milama	Gabon	12.02	
7	Mystique Jones	Nauru	12.84	
8	Margaret Teiti	Cook Islands	13.35	

==== Heat 3 ====
Wind: +0.3 m/s

Rank	Name	Nationality	Time	Notes
1	Julia Sutschet	Germany	11.68	Q
2	Natalya Pogrebnyak	Ukraine	11.73	Q
3	Sheniqua Ferguson	Bahamas	11.74	q
4	Nao Okabe	Japan	12.00	
5	Noora Hämäläinen	Finland	12.02	
6	Amanda Choo Sze Min	Singapore	12.26	
7	Masseta Bamba	Burkina Faso	12.79	
8	Aleksandra Spaseska	North Macedonia	13.30	

==== Heat 4 ====
Wind: +1.6 m/s

Rank	Name	Nationality	Time	Notes
1	Lina Grinčikaitė	Lithuania	11.45	Q
2	Emilie Gaydu	France	11.53	Q
3	Sergine Kouanga	Cameroon	11.67	q
4	Jessica Paoletta	Italy	11.90	
5	Tameka Williams	Saint Kitts and Nevis	12.00	
6	Maja Mihalinec	Slovenia	12.08	
7	Manuela Schwarz	Germany	12.16	
8	Neloumta Blague	Chad	12.79	

==== Heat 5 ====
Wind: +1.1 m/s

Rank	Name	Nationality	Time	Notes
1	Tezdzhan Naimova	Bulgaria	11.43	Q
2	Yomara Hinestroza	Colombia	11.80	Q
3	Chisato Fukushima	Japan	11.83	q
4	Tatiane Ferraz	Brazil	11.91	
5	Kate Leitch	Australia	11.97	
6	Ma Xiaoyan	China	12.22	
7	Shiffana Flowers	Belize	12.52	
8	Cherith Fisher	Marshall Islands	14.77	

==== Heat 6 ====
Wind: +0.8 m/s

Rank	Name	Nationality	Time	Notes
1	Gabby Mayo	United States	11.43	Q
2	Asha Philip	United Kingdom	11.45	Q
3	Constance Mkenku	South Africa	11.73	q
4	Oona Vilén	Finland	11.75	q
5	Amparo Cotán	Spain	11.93	
6	Andreea Ogrăzeanu	Romania	12.00	
7	Maria Ikelap	Micronesia	13.94	
8	Savannah Sanitoa	American Samoa	14.56	

==== Heat 7 ====
Wind: +0.1 m/s

Rank	Name	Nationality	Time	Notes
1	Gladys Nwaubani	Nigeria	11.74	Q
2	Martina Giovanetti	Italy	11.76	Q
3	Jana Lyadnova	Russia	11.79	q
4	T'Shonda Webb	Bahamas	11.86	
5	Whitney Wellington	Canada	12.01	
6	Toea Wisil	Papua New Guinea	12.17	
7	Mary Jane Vincent	Mauritius	12.39	
8	Melini Chatzitheori	Cyprus	12.44	

==== Heat 8 ====
Wind: +0.6 m/s

Rank	Name	Nationality	Time	Notes
1	Franciela Krasucki	Brazil	11.58	Q
2	Ezinne Okparaebo	Norway	11.65	Q
3	Marika Popowicz	Poland	11.71	q
4	Justina Sule	Nigeria	11.81	q
5	Kateřina Čechová	Czech Republic	11.85	
6	Kimberley Hyacinthe	Canada	11.87	
7	Tina Jures	Slovenia	12.12	
8	Tracy Joseph	Costa Rica	12.52	

== Participation ==
According to an unofficial count, 63 athletes from 46 countries participated in the event.

- American Samoa (1)
- Angola (1)
- Australia (2)
- Bahamas (2)
- Belize (1)
- Brazil (2)
- Bulgaria (2)
- Burkina Faso (1)
- Cameroon (1)
- Canada (2)
- Chad (1)
- China (2)
- Colombia (1)
- Cook Islands (1)
- Costa Rica (1)
- Cyprus (1)
- Czech Republic (1)
- Finland (2)
- France (2)
- Gabon (1)
- Germany (2)
- Italy (2)
- Jamaica (2)
- Japan (2)
- Lithuania (1)
- North Macedonia (1)
- Marshall Islands (1)
- Mauritius (1)
- Micronesia (1)
- Monaco (1)
- Nauru (1)
- Nigeria (2)
- Norway (2)
- Papua New Guinea (1)
- Poland (1)
- Romania (1)
- Russia (1)
- Saint Kitts and Nevis (1)
- Singapore (1)
- Slovenia (2)
- South Africa (2)
- Spain (1)
- Trinidad and Tobago (1)
- Ukraine (1)
- United Kingdom (1)
- United States (2)
