= 2011 South American Championships in Athletics – Results =

These are the official results of the 2011 South American Championships in Athletics which took place on June 2–5, 2011 in Buenos Aires, Argentina.

== Men's results ==
=== 100 meters ===
Heats – June 2

Rank	Heat	Name	Nationality	Time	Notes
1	2	Álvaro Gómez	Colombia	10.38	Q
2	1	Alonso Edward	Panama	10.50	Q
3	3	Kael Becerra	Chile	10.51	Q
4	1	Sandro Viana	Brazil	10.54	Q
5	2	Nilson André	Brazil	10.60	Q
6	1	Miguel Wilken	Argentina	10.61	q
7	1	Franklin Nazareno	Ecuador	10.64	q
8	2	Cristián Reyes	Chile	10.66	
9	3	Michel Mary	Uruguay	10.67	Q
10	3	Geronimo Goeloe	Aruba	10.68	
11	3	Isidro Montoya	Colombia	10.71	
12	3	Artur Bruno Rojas	Bolivia	10.78	
13	2	Luis Morán	Ecuador	10.88	
14	1	Heber Viera	Uruguay	11.17	
15	1	Joshua Jourdan	Paraguay	11.19	
16	3	José Manuel Garaventa	Argentina	11.64	
	2	Adrian Ferreira	Paraguay	DNF	
	2	Rupert Perry	Guyana	DNS	

Final – June 2

Rank	Name	Nationality	Time	Notes
1st place, gold medalist(s)	Nilson André	Brazil	10.35	
2nd place, silver medalist(s)	Kael Becerra	Chile	10.41	
3rd place, bronze medalist(s)	Sandro Viana	Brazil	10.44	
4	Miguel Wilken	Argentina	10.66	
5	Michel Mary	Uruguay	10.68	
6	Franklin Nazareno	Ecuador	10.71	
	Alonso Edward	Panama	DQ	
	Álvaro Gómez	Colombia	DNS	

=== 200 meters ===
Heats – June 4

Rank	Heat	Name	Nationality	Time	Notes
1	1	Daniel Grueso	Colombia	20.84	Q
2	1	Mariano Jiménez	Argentina	21.05	Q
3	2	Sandro Viana	Brazil	21.07	Q
4	1	Cristián Reyes	Chile	21.14	Q
5	2	Kael Becerra	Chile	21.23	Q
6	2	Michel Mary	Uruguay	21.35	Q
7	1	Ailson Feitosa	Brazil	21.42	Q
8	2	Roberto Murillo	Colombia	21.53	Q
9	2	Andrés Rodríguez	Panama	21.54	
10	1	Artur Bruno Rojas	Bolivia	21.55	
11	2	Álex Quiñónez	Ecuador	21.57	
12	2	Geronimo Goeloe	Aruba	21.84	
13	1	Franklin Nazareno	Ecuador	21.99	
14	1	Heber Viera	Uruguay	22.45	
	2	Augusto Stanley	Paraguay	DQ	
	1	Rupert Perry	Guyana	DNS	

Final – June 4

Rank	Name	Nationality	Time	Notes
1st place, gold medalist(s)	Daniel Grueso	Colombia	20.90	
2nd place, silver medalist(s)	Mariano Jiménez	Argentina	21.06	
3rd place, bronze medalist(s)	Cristián Reyes	Chile	21.09	
4	Kael Becerra	Chile	21.20	
5	Michel Mary	Uruguay	21.30	
6	Ailson Feitosa	Brazil	22.07	
7	Roberto Murillo	Colombia	59.99	
	Sandro Viana	Brazil	DQ	

=== 400 meters ===
Heats – June 3

Rank	Heat	Name	Nationality	Time	Notes
1	1	Augusto Stanley	Paraguay	48.32	Q
2	1	Kléberson Davide	Brazil	48.34	Q
3	1	Geiner Mosquera	Colombia	48.48	Q
4	2	Luís Ambrosio	Brazil	48.54	Q
5	1	Fábio Martínez	Argentina	48.59	q
6	2	Josue Iarritu	Argentina	48.77	Q
7	2	Jorge Rojas	Chile	48.99	Q
8	1	Julio Pérez	Peru	49.11	q
9	2	Diego Palomeque	Colombia	49.17	
10	2	Fernando López	Uruguay	49.99	
11	2	Jesus Leguizamon	Paraguay	51.17	

Final – June 3

Rank	Name	Nationality	Time	Notes
1st place, gold medalist(s)	Kléberson Davide	Brazil	46.74	
2nd place, silver medalist(s)	Geiner Mosquera	Colombia	47.19	
3rd place, bronze medalist(s)	Luís Ambrosio	Brazil	47.57	
4	Augusto Stanley	Paraguay	47.99	
5	Josue Iarritu	Argentina	48.09	
6	Fábio Martínez	Argentina	48.62	
7	Jorge Rojas	Chile	48.90	
8	Julio Pérez	Peru	49.17	

=== 800 meters ===
Final – June 4

Rank	Name	Nationality	Time	Notes
1st place, gold medalist(s)	Rafith Rodríguez	Colombia	1:51.38	
2nd place, silver medalist(s)	Kléberson Davide	Brazil	1:52.42	
3rd place, bronze medalist(s)	Sebastián Vega	Argentina	1:52.43	
4	Franco David Díaz	Argentina	1:52.79	
5	Freddy Espinosa	Colombia	1:53.77	
6	Eduardo Gregorio	Uruguay	1:53.91	
7	Julio Pérez	Peru	1:54.20	
8	Mauricio Valdivia	Chile	1:54.25	
9	Milton Castro	Uruguay	1:54.75	
10	Kevin Angulo	Ecuador	1:57.91	
	Leslie Encina	Chile	DNF	

=== 1500 meters ===
Final – June 3

Rank	Name	Nationality	Time	Notes
1st place, gold medalist(s)	Leandro de Oliveira	Brazil	3:45.55	
2nd place, silver medalist(s)	Hudson de Souza	Brazil	3:46.35	
3rd place, bronze medalist(s)	Federico Bruno	Argentina	3:47.81	
4	Leslie Encina	Chile	3:48.02	
5	Alexis Santiago	Venezuela	3:48.69	
6	Iván Darío González	Colombia	3:48.90	
7	Mauricio Valdivia	Chile	3:49.08	
8	Eduardo Gregorio	Uruguay	3:49.87	
9	Santiago Godoy	Uruguay	3:51.23	
10	Freddy Espinosa	Colombia	3:51.78	
11	Luciano Almiron	Argentina	3:53.96	
12	Derlis Ayala	Paraguay	3:54.09	
	Jhon Cusi	Peru	DNF	

=== 5000 meters ===
Final – June 2

Rank	Name	Nationality	Time	Notes
1st place, gold medalist(s)	Javier Carriqueo	Argentina	13:58.27	
2nd place, silver medalist(s)	Víctor Aravena	Chile	13:59.81	
3rd place, bronze medalist(s)	Javier Guarín	Colombia	14:00.64	
4	Marcelo Cabrini	Brazil	14:03.07	
5	José Magno Mota	Brazil	14:04.03	
6	Jhon Cusi	Peru	14:05.52	
7	Alexander de los Santos	Uruguay	14:16.40	
8	Jorge Merida	Argentina	14:17.24	
9	Raul Machahuay	Peru	14:17.96	
10	Derlis Ayala	Paraguay	14:35.77	
11	Martín Cuestas	Uruguay	14:42.75	
12	César Fernández	Bolivia	15:09.80	
	Mauricio González	Colombia	DNF	

=== 10,000 meters ===
Final – June 5

Rank	Name	Nationality	Time	Notes
1st place, gold medalist(s)	Giovani dos Santos	Brazil	28:41.02	
2nd place, silver medalist(s)	Damião de Souza	Brazil	28:53.94	
3rd place, bronze medalist(s)	John Tello	Colombia	28:56.46	
4	Jhon Cusi	Peru	28:56.50	
5	Javier Carriqueo	Argentina	29:06.04	
6	Alexander de los Santos	Uruguay	29:29.84	
7	Miguel Barzola	Argentina	29:30.13	
8	Javier Guarín	Colombia	29:30.39	
9	Raul Machahuay	Peru	29:33.91	
10	Arias Lervis	Venezuela	29:54.53	
11	Leslie Encina	Chile	30:01.30	
	César Fernández	Bolivia	DNF	
	Alexis Santiago	Venezuela	DNF	

=== 110 meters hurdles ===
Heats – June 2

Rank	Heat	Name	Nationality	Time	Notes
1	2	Matheus Facho Inocêncio	Brazil	13.83	Q
2	1	Jorge McFarlane	Peru	13.93	Q
3	1	Éder Antonio Souza	Brazil	14.02	Q
4	1	Paulo Villar	Colombia	14.35	Q
5	2	Junior Castillo	Peru	14.53	Q
6	2	Mariano Romero	Argentina	14.63	Q
7	2	Víctor Arancibia	Chile	14.65	q
8	1	Luis Montenegro	Chile	14.75	q
9	1	Ernesto Stanley	Paraguay	14.88	
10	1	Federico Ruíz	Argentina	15.03	
11	2	Mauricio Pereira	Paraguay	15.17	

Final – June 2

Rank	Name	Nationality	Time	Notes
1st place, gold medalist(s)	Matheus Facho Inocêncio	Brazil	13.70	
2nd place, silver medalist(s)	Jorge McFarlane	Peru	13.77	
3rd place, bronze medalist(s)	Paulo Villar	Colombia	13.85	
4	Éder Antonio Souza	Brazil	13.98	
5	Luis Montenegro	Chile	14.58	
6	Junior Castillo	Peru	14.77	
7	Víctor Arancibia	Chile	14.79	
8	Mariano Romero	Argentina	14.87	

=== 400 meters hurdles ===
Heats – June 3

Rank	Heat	Name	Nationality	Time	Notes
1	1	Andrés Silva	Uruguay	51.38	Q
2	2	Víctor Solarte	Venezuela	52.73	Q
3	2	Mahau Suguimati	Brazil	52.75	Q
4	2	José Ignacio Pignataro	Argentina	52.88	Q
5	2	Yeison Rivas	Colombia	52.99	q
6	1	João dos Santos Neto	Brazil	53.31	Q
7	1	Christian Deymonnaz	Argentina	53.80	Q
8	1	Juan Pablo Maturana	Colombia	54.60	q
9	2	Miguel Cabrera	Paraguay	57.79	
	1	Luis Montenegro	Chile	DNS	

Final – June 3

Rank	Name	Nationality	Time	Notes
1st place, gold medalist(s)	Andrés Silva	Uruguay	49.94	
2nd place, silver medalist(s)	Mahau Suguimati	Brazil	51.11	
3rd place, bronze medalist(s)	Víctor Solarte	Venezuela	51.13	
4	José Ignacio Pignataro	Argentina	52.16	
5	João dos Santos Neto	Brazil	52.18	
6	Yeison Rivas	Colombia	52.33	
7	Juan Pablo Maturana	Colombia	53.51	
8	Christian Deymonnaz	Argentina	53.80	

=== 3000 meters steeplechase ===
Final – June 4

Rank	Name	Nationality	Time	Notes
1st place, gold medalist(s)	Hudson de Souza	Brazil	8:36.53	
2nd place, silver medalist(s)	Marvin Blanco	Venezuela	8:37.02	
3rd place, bronze medalist(s)	Mariano Mastromarino	Argentina	8:38.91	
4	Mario Bazan	Peru	8:39.38	
5	José Peña	Venezuela	8:44.18	
6	Gerar Giraldo	Colombia	8:44.48	
7	André de Santana	Brazil	8:48.01	
8	Enzo Yanez	Chile	8:49.13	
9	Santiago Figueroa	Argentina	8:53.22	
10	Jorge Arias	Ecuador	9:01.64	
11	Daniel Estrada	Chile	9:03.32	
12	Cristian Patiño	Ecuador	9:07.42	
13	Derlis Ayala	Paraguay	9:25.20	
	Martín Mañana	Uruguay	DNF	

=== 4 x 100 meters relay ===
Final – June 5

Rank	Nation	Competitors	Time	Notes
1st place, gold medalist(s)	Brazil	Carlos Roberto de Moraes, Jr., Sandro Viana, Nilson Andrè, Ailson Feitosa	39.87	
2nd place, silver medalist(s)	Colombia	Isidro Montoya, Geiner Mosquera, Luis Nuñez, Daniel Grueso	39.88	
3rd place, bronze medalist(s)	Chile	Ignacio Rojas, Cristián Reyes, Kael Becerra, Jorge Rojas	40.83	
4	Argentina	Leonardo Rodríguez, Mariano Jiménez, Miguel Wilken, Juan Manuel Jasid	41.02	
5	Ecuador	Luis Morán, Franklin Nazareno, Álex Quiñónez, Hugo Chila	41.90	
6	Paraguay	Jesus Leguizamon, Joshua Jourdan, Augusto Stanley, Ernesto Stanley	43.10	

=== 4 x 400 meters relay ===
Final – June 5

Rank	Nation	Competitors	Time	Notes
1st place, gold medalist(s)	Brazil	Luís Ambrosio, Kléberson Davide, Wagner Cardoso, Hederson Estefani	3:08.95	
2nd place, silver medalist(s)	Colombia	Yeison Rivas, Geiner Mosquera, Diego Palomeque, Rafith Rodríguez	3:09.67	
3rd place, bronze medalist(s)	Argentina	Josue Iarritu, Fabio Martínez, Miguel Wilken, Mariano Jiménez	3:13.30	
4	Chile	Jorge Rojas, Luis Montenegro, Ignacio Rojas, Cristián Reyes	3:15.58	
	Paraguay	Jesus Leguizamon, Joshua Jourdan, Augusto Stanley, Ernesto Stanley		

=== 20,000 meters walk ===
Final – June 5

Rank	Name	Nationality	Time	Notes
1st place, gold medalist(s)	Andrés Chocho	Ecuador	1:20:23.8	NR
2nd place, silver medalist(s)	Gustavo Restrepo	Colombia	1:20:36.6	NR
3rd place, bronze medalist(s)	Yerko Araya	Chile	1:20:47.2	NR
4	Caio Bonfim	Brazil	1:20:58.5	NR
5	James Rendón	Colombia	1:21:13.6	
6	Juan Manuel Cano	Argentina	1:23:09.0	NR
7	Mauricio Arteaga	Ecuador	1:23:46.5	
8	Fabio González	Argentina	1:25:39.2	
9	Ronald Quispe	Bolivia	1:25:59.2	NR
	Moacir Zimmermann	Brazil	DQ	
	Edward Araya	Chile	DQ	

=== High jump ===
Final – June 3

Rank	Athlete	Nationality	2.00	2.05	2.08	2.11	2.14	2.17	2.20	2.23	2.29	Result	Notes
1st place, gold medalist(s)	Diego Ferrin	Ecuador	–	–	–	o	–	o	o	xo	xx	2.23	
2nd place, silver medalist(s)	Guilherme Cobbo	Brazil	–	o	–	o	o	xxo	o	xxx		2.20	SB
3rd place, bronze medalist(s)	Carlos Layoy	Argentina	–	o	–	o	o	o	xo	xxx		2.20	SB
4	Wanner Miller	Colombia	–	–	–	o	o	xo	xxx			2.17	
5	Talles Silva	Brazil	–	o	–	xo	o	xo	xxx			2.17	SB
6	Santiago Guerci	Argentina	–	o	–	o	o	xxx				2.14	
7	Carlos Izquierdo	Colombia	o	o	o	o	xxo	xxx				2.14	

=== Pole vault ===
Final – June 5

Rank	Athlete	Nationality	4.70	4.90	5.00	5.20	5.30	5.35	Result	Notes
1st place, gold medalist(s)	Fábio Gomes da Silva	Brazil	–	–	–	o	o	o	5.35	
2nd place, silver medalist(s)	Germán Chiaraviglio	Argentina	–	–	o	o	o		5.30	
3rd place, bronze medalist(s)	Rubén Benitez	Argentina	o	o	xxx				4.90	
4	Augusto Dutra	Brazil	–	xo	xxx				4.90	
	Lenin Zambrano	Ecuador	xxx						NM	

=== Long jump ===
Final – June 5

Rank	Athlete	Nationality	#1	#2	#3	#4	#5	#6	Result	Notes
1st place, gold medalist(s)	Jorge McFarlane	Peru	7.78	–	7.95	–	7.82	–	7.95	
2nd place, silver medalist(s)	Rafael Mello	Brazil	7.78	X	7.63	7.85	7.68	–	7.85	
3rd place, bronze medalist(s)	Daniel Pineda	Chile	7.74	7.71	7.82	7.76	X	7.78	7.82	
4	Víctor Castillo	Venezuela	7.72	X	7.56	7.38	7.66	7.47	7.72	
5	Rogério Bispo	Brazil	7.71	7.66	7.53	7.56	6.16	7.55	7.71	
6	Hugo Chila	Ecuador	7.31	7.38	X	X	X	X	7.38	
7	Maximiliano Díaz	Argentina	7.26	X	X	X	X	X	7.26	
8	Federico Acha	Argentina	X	X	6.76	6.77	X	X	6.77	
9	Miguel López	Bolivia	X	6.54	X				6.54	
	Jhon Murillo	Colombia	X	X	X				NM	

=== Triple jump ===
Final – June 4

Rank	Athlete	Nationality	#1	#2	#3	#4	#5	#6	Result	Notes
1st place, gold medalist(s)	Maximiliano Díaz	Argentina	16.21	16.06	16.08	16.15	16.20	16.51	16.51	
2nd place, silver medalist(s)	Jonathan Henrique Silva	Brazil	X	16.30	16.45	15.67	X	15.91	16.45	
3rd place, bronze medalist(s)	Jefferson Sabino	Brazil	X	16.13	15.96	X	X	16.45	16.45	
4	Marcelo Pichipil	Argentina	X	X	14.91	X	14.97	X	14.97	
5	Ivan Ortiz	Bolivia	13.95	X	14.02	13.90	13.85	13.73	14.02	
	Jhon Murillo	Colombia	X	X	X	X	X	X	NM	

=== Shot put ===
Final – June 2

Rank	Athlete	Nationality	#1	#2	#3	#4	#5	#6	Result	Notes
1st place, gold medalist(s)	Germán Lauro	Argentina	19.61	19.31	X	16.15	19.29	X	19.61	
2nd place, silver medalist(s)	Eder Moreno	Colombia	18.59	X	18.55	18.47	18.93	18.45	18.93	
3rd place, bronze medalist(s)	Maximiliano Alonso	Chile	17.46	17.42	17.62	17.35	17.95	17.10	17.95	
4	Ronald Julião	Brazil	17.52	17.74	X	17.61	17.59	17.88	17.88	
5	Nicolas Martina	Argentina	17.56	17.54	17.84	X	17.11	X	17.84	
6	Aldo Gonzales	Bolivia	16.49	16.47	15.92	16.76	X	16.11	16.76	
7	Douglas Ataide	Brazil	X	X	15.81	16.46	16.70	16.46	16.70	
8	Diego Osorio	Chile	16.51	16.50	X	X	16.17	X	16.51	

=== Discus throw ===
Final – June 4

Rank	Athlete	Nationality	#1	#2	#3	#4	#5	#6	Result	Notes
1st place, gold medalist(s)	Ronald Julião	Brazil	62.08	61.04	60.96	X	X	62.72	62.72	
2nd place, silver medalist(s)	Germán Lauro	Argentina	X	46.03	59.38	X	57.60	59.98	59.98	
3rd place, bronze medalist(s)	Jesús Parejo	Venezuela	57.42	55.94	56.75	X	56.81	56.06	57.42	
4	Carlos Valle	Brazil	56.53	55.94	57.19	X	X	53.36	57.19	
5	Jorge Balliengo	Argentina	53.33	55.76	X	X	55.49	56.82	56.82	
6	Maximiliano Alonso	Chile	X	53.92	X	X	54.02	X	54.02	
7	Rodolfo Casanova	Uruguay	51.31	20.21	48.48	49.43	49.03	X	51.31	

=== Hammer throw ===
Final – June 3

Rank	Athlete	Nationality	#1	#2	#3	#4	#5	#6	Result	Notes
1st place, gold medalist(s)	Juan Ignacio Cerra	Argentina	70.86	71.59	71.61	72.12	71.07	71.26	72.12	
2nd place, silver medalist(s)	Wagner Domingos	Brazil	67.75	69.71	69.25	X	70.65	68.88	70.65	
3rd place, bronze medalist(s)	Allan Wolski	Brazil	65.29	66.85	X	X	X	64.01	66.85	
4	Roberto Saez	Chile	63.60	X	64.57	64.94	64.27	64.27	64.94	
5	Fabian Di Paolo	Argentina	61.13	61.39	62.25	61.86	X	–	62.25	
6	Freimar Arias	Colombia	58.28	59.18	57.05	59.30	60.14	X	60.14	
7	Jacobo Saldarriaga	Colombia	58.02	56.73	X	X	55.90	56.85	58.02	
8	Braulio Guillermo	Ecuador	X	52.80	54.94	55.42	X	X	55.42	
9	Rodney Morinigo	Paraguay	52.60	51.95	47.31				52.60	
10	Jesús Sánchez	Paraguay	49.52	50.27	X				50.27	

=== Javelin throw ===
Final – June 5

Rank	Athlete	Nationality	#1	#2	#3	#4	#5	#6	Result	Notes
1st place, gold medalist(s)	Arley Ibargüen	Colombia	69.16	X	X	73.61	X	73.43	73.61	
2nd place, silver medalist(s)	Dayron Marquez	Colombia	72.63	72.46	71.29	72.27	73.15	72.21	73.15	
3rd place, bronze medalist(s)	Victor Fatecha	Paraguay	66.70	71.09	66.70	X	72.51	71.15	72.51	
4	Braian Toledo	Argentina	70.81	64.77	71.05	70.49	68.22	71.15	71.05	
5	Júlio César de Oliveira	Brazil	67.42	69.98	X	68.28	70.40	70.94	70.94	
6	Jander Nunes	Brazil	65.91	67.40	65.95	69.53	X	65.54	69.53	
7	Diego Moraga	Chile	66.90	X	60.38	65.83	X	65.21	66.90	
8	Tomas Guerra	Chile	65.97	X	65.45	64.16	X	66.51	66.51	
9	Edgar Jara	Paraguay	56.72	56.55	61.95				61.95	
10	José Escobar	Ecuador	61.76	X	X				61.76	
11	Pablo Mauricio Jaime	Argentina	57.03	59.02	53.55				59.02	

=== Decathlon ===
Final – June 2–3

The highest mark recorded in each event is highlighted in yellow

Rank	Athlete	Nationality	100m	LJ	SP	HJ	400m	110m H	DT	PV	JT	1500m	Points	Notes
1st place, gold medalist(s)	Luiz Alberto de Araújo	Brazil	10.84	7.15	14.14	1.97	49.08	14.52	45.97	4.60	52.85	4:35.31	7944	PB
2nd place, silver medalist(s)	Román Gastaldi	Argentina	10.98	7.38	14.29	1.97	50.73	15.59	42.68	4.30	54.74	4:51.17	7545	
3rd place, bronze medalist(s)	Georni Jaramillo	Venezuela	11.03	6.76	14.21	1.79	49.17	14.87	39.45	3.70	50.71	4:57.39	7051	
4	Fernando Korniejczuk	Argentina	11.52	6.59	12.74	1.97	53.27	15.48	40.74	4.30	46.72	5:10.71	6777	
5	Anderson Venâncio	Brazil	11.01	6.76	13.49	1.97	49.80	15.17	40.02	NM	55.82	5:03.83	6619	
6	Esteban Salgado	Colombia	11.25	6.38	12.10	1.82	50.94	16.13	37.35	2.80	43.99	4:32.62	6369	
7	José Gabriel Ramirez	Paraguay	11.85	6.28	9.02	NM	54.50	17.83	28.65	2.80	46.10	4:56.85	4772	
	Oscar Mina	Ecuador	11.16	6.28	11.86	1.91	DNS	–	–	–	–	–	DNF	

== Women's results ==
=== 100 meters ===
Heats – June 2

Rank	Heat	Name	Nationality	Time	Notes
1	1	Ana Claudia Silva	Brazil	11.47	Q
2	1	Yomara Hinestroza	Colombia	11.61	Q
3	2	Alejandra Idrobo	Colombia	11.81	Q
4	2	Rosemar Coelho Neto	Brazil	11.81	Q
5	2	Erika Chávez	Ecuador	11.89	Q
6	1	Daniela Pávez	Chile	11.94	Q
7	1	Ramona van der Vloot	Suriname	12.10	Q
8	2	Carolina Díaz	Chile	12.22	Q
9	1	Florencia Lamboglia	Argentina	12.33	
10	2	Macarena Solís	Argentina	12.71	
11	1	Mariza Karabia	Paraguay	12.77	
12	2	Dana Jourdan	Paraguay	12.83	

Final – June 2

Rank	Name	Nationality	Time	Notes
1st place, gold medalist(s)	Ana Claudia Silva	Brazil	11.46	
2nd place, silver medalist(s)	Yomara Hinestroza	Colombia	11.63	
3rd place, bronze medalist(s)	Rosemar Coelho Neto	Brazil	11.80	
4	Alejandra Idrobo	Colombia	11.84	
5	Erika Chávez	Ecuador	11.92	
6	Daniela Pávez	Chile	11.93	
7	Ramona van der Vloot	Suriname	12.16	
8	Carolina Díaz	Chile	12.23	

=== 200 meters ===
Heats – June 4

Rank	Heat	Name	Nationality	Time	Notes
1	1	Norma González	Colombia	23.48	Q
2	1	Erika Chávez	Ecuador	23.66	Q
3	1	Jailma De Lima	Brazil	23.86	Q
4	2	Ana Claudia Silva	Brazil	23.88	Q
5	2	Yomara Hinestroza	Colombia	24.21	Q
6	2	Isidora Jiménez	Chile	24.38	Q
7	1	Nancy Garcés Hurtado	Venezuela	24.50	q
8	1	María Fernanda Mackenna	Chile	24.54	q
9	2	Ramona van der Vloot	Suriname	24.69	
10	2	Florencia Lamboglia	Argentina	25.10	
11	2	Leslie Arnéz	Bolivia	26.04	
12	1	Ana Laura Catelén	Argentina	26.30	
13	2	Noelia Vera	Paraguay	27.49	
	2	Marysabel Romero Lea Plaza	Bolivia	DNF	

Final – June 4

Rank	Name	Nationality	Time	Notes
1st place, gold medalist(s)	Ana Claudia Silva	Brazil	23.18	
2nd place, silver medalist(s)	Norma González	Colombia	23.22	
3rd place, bronze medalist(s)	Jailma De Lima	Brazil	23.54	
4	Erika Chávez	Ecuador	23.74	
5	Yomara Hinestroza	Colombia	23.88	
6	María Fernanda Mackenna	Chile	24.56	
7	Isidora Jiménez	Chile	24.56	
8	Nancy Garcés Hurtado	Venezuela	24.64	

=== 400 meters ===
Heats – June 3

Rank	Heat	Name	Nationality	Time	Notes
1	2	Jennifer Padilla	Colombia	53.37	Q
2	2	Joelma Sousa	Brazil	53.45	Q
3	1	Norma González	Colombia	54.48	Q
4	1	Geisa Aparecida Coutinho	Brazil	54.72	Q
5	2	María Fernanda Mackenna	Chile	55.65	Q
6	1	Nancy Garcés Hurtado	Venezuela	56.55	Q
7	2	María Ayelén Diogo	Argentina	57.42	q
8	1	Gisela Hernández	Argentina	58.08	q
9	1	Paula Goni	Chile	58.09	
10	2	Leslie Arnéz	Bolivia	58.42	
11	1	Nancy Fretes	Paraguay	1:02.15	
12	2	Noelia Vera	Paraguay	1:03.99	

Final – June 3

Rank	Name	Nationality	Time	Notes
1st place, gold medalist(s)	Norma González	Colombia	52.14	
2nd place, silver medalist(s)	Jennifer Padilla	Colombia	52.55	
3rd place, bronze medalist(s)	Geisa Aparecida Coutinho	Brazil	52.84	
4	Joelma Sousa	Brazil	53.42	
5	Nancy Garcés Hurtado	Venezuela	55.68	
6	María Fernanda Mackenna	Chile	55.80	
7	María Ayelén Diogo	Argentina	56.52	
8	Gisela Hernández	Argentina	58.71	

=== 800 meters ===
Final – June 4

Rank	Name	Nationality	Time	Notes
1st place, gold medalist(s)	Rosibel García	Colombia	2:04.76	
2nd place, silver medalist(s)	Andrea Ferris	Panama	2:05.13	
3rd place, bronze medalist(s)	Muriel Coneo	Colombia	2:05.25	
4	Christiane Ritz	Brazil	2:06.04	
5	Jessica dos Santos	Brazil	2:08.17	
6	Daisy Urgarte	Bolivia	2:06.96	
7	Ana Ailín Funes	Argentina	2:09.31	PB
8	Mariana Borelli	Argentina	2:09.59	
9	Fatima Amarilla	Paraguay	2:19.40	

=== 1500 meters ===
Final – June 3

Rank	Name	Nationality	Time	Notes
1st place, gold medalist(s)	Rosibel García	Colombia	4:22.18	
2nd place, silver medalist(s)	Tatiele Roberta de Carvalho	Brazil	4:22.94	
3rd place, bronze medalist(s)	Sandra Amarillo	Argentina	4:23.94	
4	Muriel Coneo	Colombia	4:24.16	
5	Nancy Gallo	Argentina	4:24.55	
6	Simone da Silva	Brazil	4:26.48	
7	Maria Caballero	Paraguay	4:46.87	
8	Marlene Acuña	Ecuador	4:57.45	

=== 5000 meters ===
Final – June 2

Rank	Name	Nationality	Time	Notes
1st place, gold medalist(s)	Fabiana Cristine da Silva	Brazil	15:39.67	
2nd place, silver medalist(s)	Rosa Godoy	Argentina	15:43.36	
3rd place, bronze medalist(s)	Cruz da Silva	Brazil	15:43.91	
4	Nadia Rodríguez	Argentina	15:53.99	
5	Wilma Arizapana	Peru	16:41.25	
6	Yolanda Fernández	Colombia	16:47.93	
7	Yoni Ninahuaman	Peru	16:54.38	

=== 10,000 meters ===
Final – June 5

Rank	Name	Nationality	Time	Notes
1st place, gold medalist(s)	Simone da Silva	Brazil	31:59.11	
2nd place, silver medalist(s)	Rosa Godoy	Argentina	32:51.10	
3rd place, bronze medalist(s)	Cruz da Silva	Brazil	32:53.72	
4	Julia Rivera	Peru	34:13.70	
5	Yolanda Fernández	Colombia	34:17.69	
6	Ángela Figueroa	Colombia	34:22.45	
7	Hortencia Arzapalo	Peru	35:26.10	
8	Karina Cordoba	Argentina	35:29.57	
9	Carmen Martínez	Paraguay	36:22.64	

=== 100 meters hurdles ===
Final – June 2

Rank	Name	Nationality	Time	Notes
1st place, gold medalist(s)	Briggite Merlano	Colombia	13.07	
2nd place, silver medalist(s)	Maíla Machado	Brazil	13.22	
3rd place, bronze medalist(s)	Lina Flórez	Colombia	13.23	
4	Agustina Zerboni	Argentina	13.54	
5	Giselle de Albuquerque	Brazil	13.73	
6	Ljubica Milos	Chile	13.96	
7	Daniela Castilo	Ecuador	15.14	
8	Anna Wickzen	Paraguay	15.70	

=== 400 meters hurdles ===
Final – June 3

Rank	Name	Nationality	Time	Notes
1st place, gold medalist(s)	Jailma de Lima	Brazil	57.13	
2nd place, silver medalist(s)	Princesa Oliveros	Colombia	58.07	
3rd place, bronze medalist(s)	Déborah Rodríguez	Uruguay	58.63	
4	Elaine Paixão	Brazil	58.64	
5	Lucy Jaramillo	Ecuador	1:00.97	
6	Belen Casetta	Argentina	1:01.60	
7	Javiera Errazuriz	Chile	1:02.56	
8	Soledad Chiriotti	Argentina	1:03.91	

=== 3000 meters steeplechase ===
Final – June 4

Rank	Name	Nationality	Time	Notes
1st place, gold medalist(s)	Ángela Figueroa	Colombia	9:57.13	
2nd place, silver medalist(s)	Eliane da Silva	Brazil	10:22.96	
3rd place, bronze medalist(s)	Jovana de la Cruz	Peru	10:24.67	
4	Sabine Heitling	Brazil	10:28.34	
5	Yoni Ninahuaman	Peru	10:37.81	
6	Florencia Borelli	Argentina	10:54.33	
7	Marlene Acuña	Ecuador	11:00.33	
8	Dayana Pérez	Venezuela	11:02.91	

=== 4 x 100 meters relay ===
Final – June 5

Rank	Nation	Competitors	Time	Notes
1st place, gold medalist(s)	Colombia	Eliecit Palacios, Maria Alejandra Idrobo, Yomara Hinestroza, Norma González	44.11	
2nd place, silver medalist(s)	Brazil	Rosemar Coelho Neto, Vanda Gomes, Ana Claudia Silva, Franciela Krasucki	44.56	
3rd place, bronze medalist(s)	Chile	Carolina Díaz, María Fernanda Mackenna, Isidora Jiménez, Daniela Pávez	46.42	
4	Argentina	María Ayelén Diogo, Leonela Graciani, Florencia Lamboglia, Constanza Eckhardt	47.63	
	Paraguay	Anna Wickzen, Dana Jourdan, Nancy Fretes, Mariza Karabia	DNF	

=== 4 x 400 meters relay ===
Final – June 5

Rank	Nation	Competitors	Time	Notes
1st place, gold medalist(s)	Brazil	Geisa Aparecida Coutinho, Aline dos Santos, Joelma Sousa, Jailma de Lima	3:31.66	
2nd place, silver medalist(s)	Colombia	María Alejandra Idrobo, Evelis Aguilar, Princesa Oliveros, Jennifer Padilla	3:37.66	
3rd place, bronze medalist(s)	Chile	Javiera Errazuriz, Isidora Jiménez, Paula Goni, María Fernanda Mackenna	3:49.51	
4	Argentina	María Ayelén Diogo, Virginia Cardozo, Nancy Gallo, Belen Casetta	3:52.52	
	Paraguay	Anna Wickzen, Fatima Amarilla, Nancy Fretes, María Caballero	DNS	

=== 20,000 meters walk ===
Final – June 5

Rank	Name	Nationality	Time	Notes
1st place, gold medalist(s)	Ingrid Hernández	Colombia	1:32:09.4	NR
2nd place, silver medalist(s)	Milangela Rosales	Venezuela	1:32:17.6	NR
3rd place, bronze medalist(s)	Arabelly Orjuela	Colombia	1:32:48.7	
4	Yadira Guamán	Ecuador	1:33:18.0	NR
5	Cisiane Lopes	Brazil	1:35:49.6	
6	Érica de Sena	Brazil	1:40:24.3	
7	Geovana Irusta	Bolivia	1:42:42.0	
8	Fariluz Morales	Peru	1:42:48.6	
9	Daiana Lujan	Argentina	1:46:31.7	NR
	Paola Pérez	Ecuador	DQ	
	Constanza Ávila	Chile	DNS	

=== High jump ===
Final – June 3

Rank	Athlete	Nationality	1.60	1.65	1.68	1.71	1.74	1.77	1.80	1.83	Result	Notes
1st place, gold medalist(s)	Karina Marielis	Venezuela	–	o	o	o	o	o	o	xxx	1.80	
2nd place, silver medalist(s)	Betsabé Páez	Argentina	–	o	–	xo	o	o	xxx		1.77	
3rd place, bronze medalist(s)	Aline Santos	Brazil	–	–	–	o	o	xo	xxx		1.77	
4	Monica Araujo	Brazil	–	–	–	o	o	xxx			1.74	
5	Jorgelina Rodríguez	Argentina	o	o	–	xo	xxx				1.71	
5	Florencia Vergara	Chile	o	o	o	xo	xxx				1.71	
7	Nulfa Palacios	Colombia	xo	xxx							1.60	

=== Pole vault ===
Final – June 2

Rank	Athlete	Nationality	3.50	3.70	3.90	4.00	4.10	4.20	4.50	4.70	4.90	Result	Notes
1st place, gold medalist(s)	Fabiana Murer	Brazil	–	–	–	–	–	–	xxo	xxo	xx	4.70	WL, CR
2nd place, silver medalist(s)	Karla da Silva	Brazil	–	–	–	xo	–	xxx				4.00	
3rd place, bronze medalist(s)	Milena Agudelo	Colombia	–	–	o	xxx						3.90	
4	Daniela Inchausti	Argentina	–	o	xo	xxx						3.90	
5	Jessica Fu	Peru	o	xxx								3.50	
6	Catalina Amarilla	Paraguay	xxo	xxx								3.50	
	Alejandra García	Argentina	–	–	–	x						NM	

=== Long jump ===
Final – June 2

Rank	Athlete	Nationality	#1	#2	#3	#4	#5	#6	Result	Notes
1st place, gold medalist(s)	Maurren Maggi	Brazil	6.44	6.31	6.52	X	6.20	–	6.52	
2nd place, silver medalist(s)	Keila Costa	Brazil	X	6.23	6.23	6.45	X	6.44	6.45	
3rd place, bronze medalist(s)	Caterine Ibargüen	Colombia	6.32	6.42	6.26	6.31	6.45	6.41	6.45	
4	Daniela Pávez	Chile	5.85	5.97	6.08	5.07	6.05	6.10	6.10	
5	Macarena Reyes	Chile	5.89	5.69	X	X	X	X	5.89	
6	Munich Tovar	Venezuela	5.83	5.65	5.73	X	5.39	X	5.83	
7	Melisa Valencia	Colombia	X	X	5.73	X	5.68	5.73	5.73	
8	Lindy Cavero	Bolivia	5.27	X	5.48	5.25	4.90	5.26	5.48	
9	Andrea Morales	Argentina	X	X	5.44				5.44	

=== Triple jump ===
Final – June 4

Rank	Athlete	Nationality	#1	#2	#3	#4	#5	#6	Result	Notes
1st place, gold medalist(s)	Caterine Ibargüen	Colombia	14.15	X	14.41	14.59	14.48	14.32	14.59	
2nd place, silver medalist(s)	Keila Costa	Brazil	13.49	13.96	X	13.76	13.74	13.61	13.96	
3rd place, bronze medalist(s)	Gisele de Oliveira	Brazil	13.30	13.43	X	13.22	13.31	–	13.43	
4	Gissely Landazury	Colombia	12.41	X	X	12.90	12.68	12.16	12.90	
5	Yudelsi González	Venezuela	11.83	X	12.67	X	12.57	12.87	12.87	
6	Mayra Pachito	Ecuador	12.28	12.17	X	12.12	12.32	12.14	12.32	
7	Paula Pitzinger	Argentina	11.72	11.72	X	X	12.19	11.93	12.19	
8	Lindy Cavero	Bolivia	X	X	12.12	11.81	12.03	12.00	12.12	
	Andrea Morales	Argentina							DNS	

=== Shot put ===
Final – June 2

Rank	Athlete	Nationality	#1	#2	#3	#4	#5	#6	Result	Notes
1st place, gold medalist(s)	Natalia Ducó	Chile	17.15	16.91	17.12	X	16.99	17.10	17.15	
2nd place, silver medalist(s)	Elisângela Adriano	Brazil	15.89	X	16.24	16.55	16.06	X	16.55	
3rd place, bronze medalist(s)	Anyela Rivas	Colombia	15.24	15.55	15.62	15.95	16.15	X	16.15	
4	Andrea Maria Britto	Brazil	15.72	X	15.66	15.67	16.02	15.94	16.02	
5	Alessandra Gamboa	Peru	X	15.28	15.46	X	15.19	X	15.46	
6	Sandra Lemus	Colombia	13.92	15.38	14.90	X	X	X	15.38	
7	Rocío Comba	Argentina	14.07	14.49	X	14.42	14.16	14.67	14.67	
8	Noelia Sersen	Argentina	13.97	14.54	14.20	X	14.16	14.21	14.54	

=== Discus throw ===
Final – June 4

Rank	Athlete	Nationality	#1	#2	#3	#4	#5	#6	Result	Notes
1st place, gold medalist(s)	Andressa de Morais	Brazil	56.38	57.54	57.23	55.37	X	X	57.54	
2nd place, silver medalist(s)	Karen Gallardo	Chile	47.69	47.69	54.91	X	54.06	54.69	54.91	
3rd place, bronze medalist(s)	Fernanda Martins	Brazil	53.80	X	50.03	X	54.18	X	54.18	
4	Rocío Comba	Argentina	53.67	52.02	49.78	51.86	X	50.31	53.67	
5	Johana Martínez	Colombia	42.68	47.50	49.14	50.50	50.62	51.30	51.30	
6	Maia Ibel Varela	Argentina	42.79	41.48	X	41.93	42.45	39.76	42.79	
7	Fatima Ramos	Peru	36.17	34.36	36.65	37.56	35.97	X	37.56	

=== Hammer throw ===
Final – June 2

Rank	Athlete	Nationality	#1	#2	#3	#4	#5	#6	Result	Notes
1st place, gold medalist(s)	Jennifer Dahlgren	Argentina	66.59	68.11	66.74	69.65	X	72.70	72.70	
2nd place, silver medalist(s)	Johana Moreno	Colombia	68.53	68.00	X	66.43	67.44	X	68.53	
3rd place, bronze medalist(s)	Rosa Rodríguez	Venezuela	65.35	67.28	X	X	63.64	X	67.28	
4	Josiane Soares	Brazil	X	59.38	X	X	61.77	X	61.77	
5	Odette Palma	Chile	57.53	57.84	60.83	X	X	X	60.83	
6	Johana Ramírez	Colombia	X	58.53	59.73	57.90	X	57.19	59.73	
7	Anna Paula Pereira	Brazil	56.05	55.37	58.55	57.35	X	55.78	58.55	
8	Marcela Solano	Chile	X	54.29	52.90	X	X	53.81	54.29	
8	Fatima Ramos	Peru	52.11	50.29	49.79				52.11	
9	Daniela Gómez	Argentina	48.13	51.42	49.87				51.42	
	Zuleima Mina	Ecuador	X	X	X				NM	

=== Javelin throw ===
Final – June 5

Rank	Athlete	Nationality	#1	#2	#3	#4	#5	#6	Result	Notes
1st place, gold medalist(s)	María Lucelly Murillo	Colombia	52.38	55.85	55.22	53.14	X	X	55.85	
2nd place, silver medalist(s)	Leryn Franco	Paraguay	45.23	51.59	49.45	54.79	55.66	X	55.66	NR
3rd place, bronze medalist(s)	Alessandra Resende	Brazil	52.15	50.59	X	54.61	53.87	X	54.61	
4	Laila Ferrer e Silva	Brazil	53.45	46.91	50.14	53.67	50.64	48.31	53.67	
5	Katryna Subeldía	Paraguay	47.76	48.03	45.63	46.45	47.58	50.14	50.14	
6	Barbara López	Argentina	46.42	45.75	49.25	44.85	47.57	45.94	49.25	
7	Flor Ruiz	Colombia	48.78	46.57	46.83	42.48	X	46.51	48.78	
8	Romina Maggi	Argentina	47.14	X	47.26	X	X	45.99	47.26	
9	María Rios	Chile	46.34	X	46.05				46.34	
10	María Mello	Uruguay	X	42.82	44.60				44.60	

=== Heptathlon ===
Final – June 4–5

The highest mark recorded in each event is highlighted in yellow

Rank	Athlete	Nationality	100m H	HJ	SP	200m	LJ	JT	800m	Points	Notes
1st place, gold medalist(s)	Vanessa Spínola	Brazil	14.63	1.68	12.59	24.71	5.43	38.17	2:23.19	5428	
2nd place, silver medalist(s)	Agustina Zerboni	Argentina	14.18	1.56	11.59	25.33	5.61	34.83	2:22.27	5226	
3rd place, bronze medalist(s)	Melry Caldeira	Brazil	14.23	1.53	12.04	25.74	5.61	37.78	2:24.33	5208	
4	Ana Camila Pirelli	Paraguay	15.12	1.62	12.74	26.18	5.22	39.21	2:24.20	5115	
5	Melisa Valencia	Colombia	15.47	1.65	10.99	25.25	5.93	27.30	2:32.47	4950	
6	Carolina Castillo	Chile	14.77	1.62	9.80	26.13	5.50	31.35	2:26.40	4874	
7	Mariza Karabia	Paraguay	14.91	1.35	11.11	26.50	4.72	39.82	2:49.12	4292	
	Macarena Reyes	Chile	DNF	1.59	DNF	DNS	–	–	–	DNF	
