= Jessica Paoletta =

Italian sprinter

Personal information
- Nationality: Italian
- Born: 21 March 1988 (age 38) Rome, Italy
- Height: 1.63 m (5 ft 4 in)
- Weight: 55 kg (121 lb)

Sport
- Country: Italy
- Sport: Athletics
- Event: Sprint
- Club: G.S. Esercito
- Coached by: Giorgio Frinolli

Achievements and titles
- Personal bests: 60 m 7.40 (2012); 100 m: 11.52 (2010)
Medal record
Mediterranean Games
Gold medal – first place	2013 Mersin	4 × 100 m relay

Jessica Paoletta (born 21 March 1988) is an Italian sprinter.

== Biography ==
Jessica Paoletta participated at one edition of the European Championships (2010), she has 3 caps in national team from 2010.

== Achievements ==
Year	Competition	Venue	Position	Event	Notes
Representing Italy
2006	World Junior Championships	(China) Beijing	30th (h)	100m	11.90 (wind: +1.6 m/s)
2006	World Junior Championships	(China) Beijing	14th (h)	4 × 100 m relay	45.57
2009	European U23 Championships	(Lithuania) Kaunas	26th (h)	100m	12.19 (wind: -0.8 m/s)
2010	European Championships	(Spain) Barcelona	Heat	4 × 100 metres relay	44.15
2013	Mediterranean Games	(Turkey) Mersin	1st	4 × 100 metres relay	44.66

== See also ==
- Italy national relay team
- Italy at the 2013 Mediterranean Games
