= Athletics at the 2010 South American Games – Women's 4 × 100 metre relay =

The Women's 4x100m Relay event at the 2010 South American Games was held on March 22 at 18:25.

== Medalists ==
Gold	Silver	Bronze
Vanusa dos Santos; Vanda Gomes; Ana Claudia Silva; Franciela Krasucki; Brazil	Nelcy Caicedo; Yenifer Padilla; Maria Alejandra Idrobo; Yomara Hinestroza; Colombia	María Ayelén Diogo; María Florencia Lamboglia; Constanza Eckhardt; Agustina Zerboni; Argentina

== Records ==
Standing records prior to the 2010 South American Games
World record	East Germany	41.37	Canberra, Australia	6 October 1985
World Leading	University of Technology (JAM)	44.46	Kingston, Jamaica	27 February 2010
South American record	Brazil	42.97	Bogotá, Colombia	10 July 2004
South American U23 record	Brazil	43.98	São Paulo, Brazil	7 July 2007

== Results ==
Results were published.

Rank	Athlete	Nationality	Reaction	Result	Notes
1st place, gold medalist(s)	Vanusa dos Santos; Vanda Gomes; Ana Claudia Silva; Franciela Krasucki	Brazil	0.204	44.47	
2nd place, silver medalist(s)	Nelcy Caicedo; Yenifer Padilla; Maria Alejandra Idrobo; Yomara Hinestroza	Colombia	0.231	44.94	
3rd place, bronze medalist(s)	María Ayelén Diogo; María Florencia Lamboglia; Constanza Eckhardt; Agustina Zerboni	Argentina	0.199	46.76	
4	Carolina Castillo; Ljubica Milos; Anneliese Grosser; Isidora Jiménez	Chile		47.29	

== See also ==
- 2010 South American Under-23 Championships in Athletics
