= Yomara Hinestroza =

Colombian sprinter (born 1988)

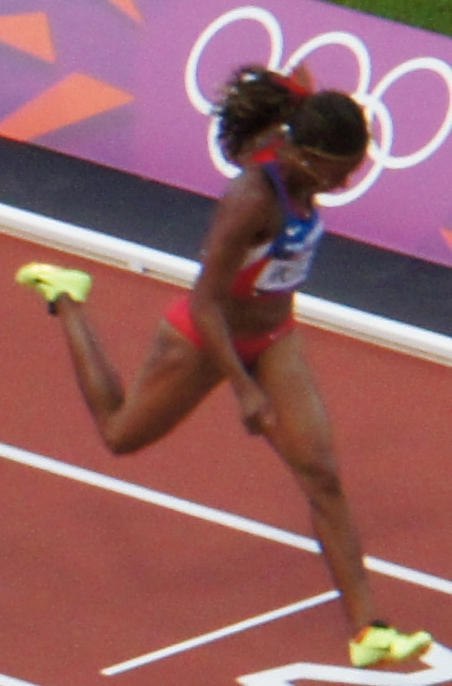
- Hinestroza at the 2012 Summer Olympics

Personal information
- Full name: Yomara Hinestroza Murillo
- Born: 20 May 1988 (age 38) Pradera, Valle del Cauca, Colombia
- Height: 1.61 m (5 ft 3 in)
- Weight: 52 kg (115 lb)

Sport
- Country: Colombia
- Sport: Women's Athletics
- Event: Sprint
- Updated on 13 June 2014

Yomara Hinestroza Murillo (born 20 May 1988) is a Colombian track and field sprint athlete.

== Biography ==
Hinestroza represented Colombia at the 2008 Summer Olympics in Beijing. She competed at the 100 metres sprint and placed fourth in her first round heat, which normally meant elimination. However, her time of 11.39 was among the ten fastest losing times, resulting in a second round spot. There she failed to qualify for the semi-finals as her time of 11.66 was the seventh time of her race.

At the 2012 Olympics, she represented Colombia in the 100 m and was part of the Colombian 4 x 100 m team.

She also represented Colombia at the 2009 and 2011 World Championships.

== Personal bests ==
- 100 m: 11.54 s (wind: +0.4 m/s) – Bogotá, Colombia, 19 July 2008
- 200 m: 23.09 s (wind: +0.1 m/s) – Bogotá, Colombia, 3 December 2004

== Achievements ==
Year	Competition	Venue	Position	Event	Notes
Representing Colombia
2002	South American Youth Championships	Asunción, Paraguay	3rd	100 m	12.46 s (-0.7 m/s)
2002	South American Youth Championships	Asunción, Paraguay	2nd	4x100 m relay	47.3 s
2002	South American Youth Championships	Asunción, Paraguay	1st	1000 m medley relay	2:13.94 min
2003	South American Junior Championships	Guayaquil, Ecuador	4th	100 m	12.01 s (0.0 m/s)
2003	South American Junior Championships	Guayaquil, Ecuador	4th	4×100 m relay	47.05 s
2003	World Youth Championships	Sherbrooke, Canada	6th (sf)	100 m	12.13 s (+1.4 m/s)
2004	South American U-23 Championships	Barquisimeto, Venezuela	3rd (h) (Note: Guest out of competition)	100 m	11.91 s (0.0 m/s)
2004	World Junior Championships	Grosseto, Italy	23rd (sf)	100 m	12.24 s (+0.6 m/s)
2004	World Junior Championships	Grosseto, Italy	—	200 m	DQ
2004	South American Youth Championships	Guayaquil, Ecuador	2nd	100 m	11.67 s (w)
2004	South American Youth Championships	Guayaquil, Ecuador	2nd	200 m	24.35 s (w)
2004	South American Youth Championships	Guayaquil, Ecuador	3rd	4x100 m relay	47.29 s
2004	South American Youth Championships	Guayaquil, Ecuador	3rd	1000 m medley relay	2:13.2 min
2005	World Youth Championships	Marrakesh, Morocco	3rd (sf) (Note: Disqualified in the final)	100 m	11.61 s (+0.2 m/s)
2005	South American Championships	Cali, Colombia	4th	100 m	11.50 s
2005	Pan American Junior Championships	Windsor, Canada	4th	100 m	11.88 s (-1.8 m/s)
2005	Pan American Junior Championships	Windsor, Canada	8th	200 m	24.64 s (+2.0 m/s)
2005	Bolivarian Games	Armenia, Colombia	3rd (no medal)	100 m	11.56 s (+1.6 m/s) A
2005	South American Junior Championships	Rosario, Argentina	2nd	100 m	11.71 s
2005	South American Junior Championships	Rosario, Argentina	2nd	200 m	23.87 s (w)
2005	South American Junior Championships	Rosario, Argentina	2nd	4x100 m relay	46.28 s
2005	South American Junior Championships	Rosario, Argentina	1st	4x400 m relay	3:44.80 min
2006	Ibero-American Championships	Ponce, Puerto Rico	6th	100 m	11.82 s
2006	Central American and Caribbean Games	Cartagena, Colombia	6th	100 m	11.75 s
2006	Central American and Caribbean Games	Cartagena, Colombia	2nd	4x100 m relay	44.32 s
2006	World Junior Championships	Beijing, China	21st (sf)	100 m	12.08 (-0.9 m/s)
2006	South American Championships	Tunja, Colombia	2nd	100 m	11.72 s
2006	South American Championships	Tunja, Colombia	4th	200 m	24.28 s
2006	South American Championships	Tunja, Colombia	2nd	4x100 m relay	44.78 s
2006	South American U23 Championships / South American Games	Buenos Aires, Argentina	2nd	100 m	11.97 (+1.9 m/s)
2006	South American U23 Championships / South American Games	Buenos Aires, Argentina	1st	4x100 m relay	45.14
2007	South American Championships	São Paulo, Brazil	2nd	4x100 m relay	44.68 s
2007	South American Junior Championships	São Paulo, Brazil	3rd	100 m	11.89 s
2007	South American Junior Championships	São Paulo, Brazil	4th	200 m	24.54 s (0.0 m/s)
2007	South American Junior Championships	São Paulo, Brazil	2nd	4x100 m relay	45.71 s
2007	South American Junior Championships	São Paulo, Brazil	3rd	4x400 m relay	3:50.61 min
2007	Pan American Junior Championships	São Paulo, Brazil	4th (h)	100 m	11.98 s (-3.2 m/s)
2007	Pan American Junior Championships	São Paulo, Brazil	4th	4×100 m relay	45.78 s
2008	Ibero-American Championships	Iquique, Chile	1st	100 m	11.58 s
2008	Ibero-American Championships	Iquique, Chile	1st	4x100 m relay	44.89 s
2008	Central American and Caribbean Championships	Cali, Colombia	6th	100 m	11.51 s
2008	Central American and Caribbean Championships	Cali, Colombia	2nd	4x100 m relay	43.56 s
2008	Olympic Games	Beijing, China	35th (h)	100 m	11.66 s
2009	Central American and Caribbean Championships	Havana, Cuba	11th (h)	100 m	11.68 s
2009	Central American and Caribbean Championships	Havana, Cuba	2nd	4x100 m relay	43.67 s
2009	World Championships	Berlin, Germany	32nd (qf)	100 m	11.76 s
2009	World Championships	Berlin, Germany	8th	4x100 m relay	43.71 s
2009	Bolivarian Games	Sucre, Bolivia	5th	100 m	11.86 s w (+2.7 m/s)
2010	South American U23 Championships / South American Games	Medellín, Colombia	2nd	100 m	11.63 s
2010	South American U23 Championships / South American Games	Medellín, Colombia	2nd	4x100 m relay	44.94 s
2010	Ibero-American Championships	San Fernando, Spain	5th	100 m	11.65 s
2010	Ibero-American Championships	San Fernando, Spain	2nd	4x100 m relay	44.29 s
2010	Central American and Caribbean Games	Mayagüez, Puerto Rico	3rd	100 m	11.51 s
2010	Central American and Caribbean Games	Mayagüez, Puerto Rico	1st	4x100 m relay	43.63 s
2011	South American Championships	Buenos Aires, Argentina	2nd	100 m	11.63 s
2011	South American Championships	Buenos Aires, Argentina	5th	200 m	23.88 s (+0.4 m/s)
2011	South American Championships	Buenos Aires, Argentina	1st	4x100 m relay	44.11 s
2011	Central American and Caribbean Championships	Mayagüez, Puerto Rico	4th	100 m	11.46 s
2011	Central American and Caribbean Championships	Mayagüez, Puerto Rico	4th	4x100 m relay	43.92 s
2011	World Championships	Daegu, South Korea	35th (h)	100 m	11.56 s
2011	World Championships	Daegu, South Korea	9th (h)	4x100 m relay	43.53 s
2011	Pan American Games	Guadalajara, Mexico	6th	100 m	11.50 s
2011	Pan American Games	Guadalajara, Mexico	3rd	4x100 m relay	43.44 s
2012	Ibero-American Championships	Barquisimeto, Venezuela	5th	100 m	11.77 s
2012	Olympic Games	London, United Kingdom	43rd (h)	100 m	11.56 s
2012	Olympic Games	London, United Kingdom	11th (h)	4x100 m relay	43.21 s
2013	South American Championships	Cartagena, Colombia	2nd	4×100 m relay	44.01 s
2013	World Championships	Moscow, Russia	15th (h)	4×100 m relay	43.65 s
2013	Bolivarian Games	Trujillo, Peru	1st	4×100 m relay	43.90 s
