= Tezdzhan Naimova =

Bulgarian sprinter

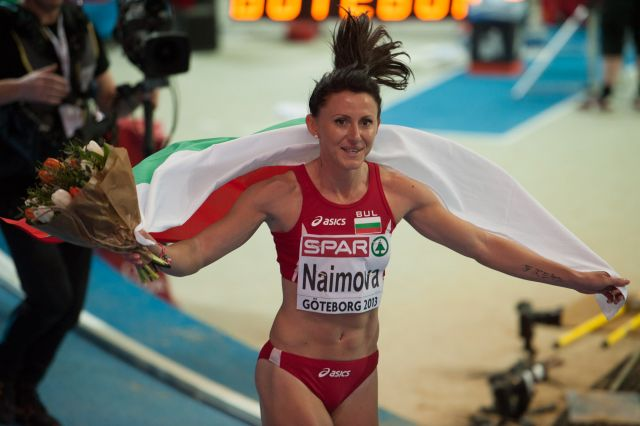
- Tezdzhan Naimova at the 2013 European Indoor Championships in Gothenburg

Personal information
- Nationality: Bulgaria
- Born: 1 May 1987 (age 39) Parvomay, Bulgaria

Sport
- Sport: Running
- Events: 60 metres, 100 metres, 200 metres
- Coached by: Stoyko Tsonov
Medal record
Women's Athletics
Representing Bulgaria
European Indoor Championships
Disqualified	2013 Gothenburg	60 m
World Junior Championships
Gold medal – first place	2006 Beijing	100 m
Gold medal – first place	2006 Beijing	200 m

Tezdzhan Naimova (Bulgarian: Тезджан Наимова; first name also rendered as Тезжан, Tezzhan or Tezcan, born 1 May 1987) is retired Bulgarian sprinter. She specialized in both the 60, 100 and 200 metres.

In 2013, Naimova received a lifetime competition ban following a second anti-doping offence.

== Junior career ==
Born in Parvomay of Turkish ethnicity, Naimova took up athletics at the age of 10 and was initially trained by Tanyo Tanev, but changed to former triple jumper Stoyko Tsonov, who has been her coach since seventh grade. She competed in the 200 metres at the 2004 World Junior Championships, but was knocked out in the semi-final. In her early childhood years, she also practiced volleyball and basketball, but her first choice always remained athletics. Naimova's idol growing up was compatriot Tereza Marinova.

In 2005, she became the Bulgarian national champion in the 100 and 200 metres (with Ivet Lalova absent). She also won a Balkan 60 metres title in the indoors in 2006. She competed at the World Indoor Championships, but was again knocked out in the semi-final. In August, Naimova won two titles at the 2006 World Junior Championships in Athletics in Beijing, in the 100 (11.28 seconds) and 200 metres (22.99, a personal best), thus completely dominating the sprint disciplines. Her personal best in the 100 metres that year was 11.23 seconds, achieved in June in Sofia.

== Senior career ==
In the 2007 indoor season, she ran the 60 metres in 7.13 seconds in February, a world leading result at the time. That season her time was only beat by Kim Gevaert, who won the 2007 European Athletics Indoor Championships in 7.10 seconds. Naimova finished fifth in the same race. In the summer, she competed at both the 100 and 200 metres at the 2007 World Championships. She again reached the semi-finals, but finished fifth there in both events, one place short of reaching the final races. She lowered her personal best times to 11.04 seconds in the 100 metres, achieved in July in Plovdiv; and 22.43 seconds in the 200 metres, achieved in June in Sofia.

The 2008 season was much worse, with season's bests of 11.43 and 23.44 seconds respectively. At the 2008 Summer Olympics in Beijing she only competed in the 100 metres event. In her first round heat she placed fifth in a time of 11.70 which was not enough to advance to the second round. In 2009 it became known that Naimova received a two-year ban from competition from the Bulgarian Athletic Federation, after that body found that she had manipulated the results of an out-of-competition IAAF urine test on 28 June 2008. All results achieved after this date would be stricken, including the Olympic Games participation.

In 2013 Naimova tested positive for the banned steroid drostanolone right after winning the 60 metres event at the 2013 European Athletics Indoor Championships held in Gothenburg in March. In September 2013, she was officially stripped of the 60m title and banned for life from athletics. Subsequently Ukraine's Mariya Ryemyen, who came second in the Gothenburg final, was declared the gold medalist of the 60m event, with France's Myriam Soumaré taking the silver medal and Bulgaria's Ivet Lalova the bronze.

== Post-athletics ==
Following her retirement, Naimova has worked as a physical trainer.
