= Kimberly Hyacinthe =

Canadian sprinter

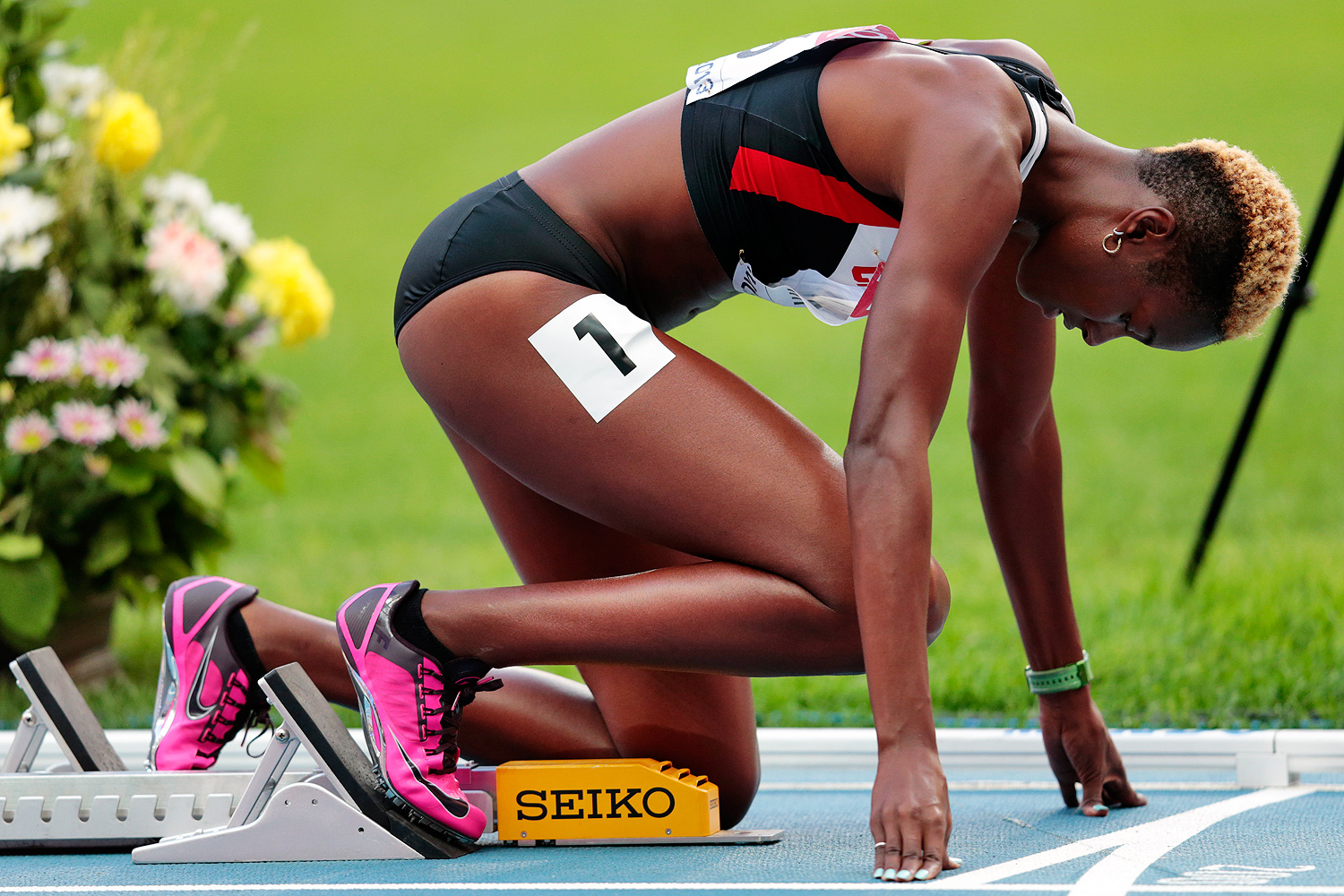
- Hyacinthe at 2013 World Championships in Athletics

Personal information
- Nationality: Canada
- Born: Montreal, Quebec, Canada
- Height: 179 cm (5 ft 10 in)
- Weight: 61 kg (134 lb)

Sport
- Sport: Track and field
- Event: 200 metres
- College team: University of Quebec
Medal record
Women's athletics
Representing Canada
Pan American Games
| Bronze medal – third place | 2015 Toronto | 4x100 m |
Summer Universiade
| Gold medal – first place | 2009 Belgrade | 4x400 m |
| Gold medal – first place | 2013 Kazan | 200 m |

Kimberly Hyacinthe is a Canadian athlete specializing in the sprinting events. She competed in the 200 meters at the 2011 World Championships in Athletics without advancing to the semifinals.

In July 2016 she was officially named to Canada's Olympic team.

== Personal life ==
Hyacinthe was born in Montreal, Quebec. In 2013, she won gold medal in the 200 meters at the 2013 Summer Universiade. He is of Haitian descent.

== Competition record ==
| Year | Competition | Venue | Position | Event | Notes |
Representing Canada
| 2005 | World Youth Championships | Marrakesh, Morocco | 23rd (sf) | 100 m | 12.02 |
| 2005 | World Youth Championships | Marrakesh, Morocco | 8th (sf) | 200 m | 24.04 (w) |
| 2005 | World Youth Championships | Marrakesh, Morocco | 10th (h) | 4 × 400 m relay | 2:12.89 |
| 2006 | World Junior Championships | Beijing, China | 28th (h) | 100 m | 11.87 (+0.6 m/s) |
| 2006 | World Junior Championships | Beijing, China | 17th (sf) | 200 m | 24.53 (-2.8 m/s) |
| 2006 | World Junior Championships | Beijing, China | 10th (h) | 4 × 100 m relay | 45.26 |
| 2007 | Pan American Junior Championships | São Paulo, Brazil | 12th (h) | 200 m | 24.52 |
| 2007 | Pan American Junior Championships | São Paulo, Brazil | 4th | 4 × 400 m relay | 3:38.85 |
| 2008 | World Junior Championships | Bydgoszcz, Poland | 9th (sf) | 200 m | 23.81 (-1.1 m/s) |
| 2008 | World Junior Championships | Bydgoszcz, Poland | 15th (h) | 4 × 100 m relay | 45.66 |
| 2009 | Universiade | Belgrade, Serbia | 6th | 200 m | 23.66 |
| 2009 | Universiade | Belgrade, Serbia | 1st | 4 × 400 m relay | 3:33.09 |
| 2009 | Jeux de la Francophonie | Beirut, Lebanon | 2nd | 200 m | 23.15 |
| 2009 | Jeux de la Francophonie | Beirut, Lebanon | 1st | 4 × 100 m relay | 44.78 |
| 2009 | Jeux de la Francophonie | Beirut, Lebanon | 1st | 4 × 400 m relay | 3:35.95 |
| 2010 | NACAC U23 Championships | Miramar, United States | 2nd | 200m | 23.14 (+2.1 m/s) w |
| 2011 | Universiade | Shenzhen, China | 12th (sf) | 200 m | 23.90 |
| 2011 | World Championships | Daegu, South Korea | 30th (h) | 200 m | 23.83 |
| 2013 | Universiade | Kazan, Russia | 1st | 200 m | 22.78 |
| 2013 | World Championships | Moscow, Russia | 17th (sf) | 200 m | 23.12 |
| 2013 | World Championships | Moscow, Russia | 6th | 4 × 100 m relay | 43.28 |
| 2014 | IAAF World Relays | Nassau, Bahamas | 9th | 4 × 100 m relay | 43.33 |
| 2014 | Commonwealth Games | Glasgow, United Kingdom | 7th | 200 m | 23.11 |
| 2014 | Commonwealth Games | Glasgow, United Kingdom | 4th | 4 × 100 m relay | 43.33 |
| 2015 | World Championships | Beijing, China | 40th (h) | 100 m | 11.54 |
| 2015 | World Championships | Beijing, China | 21st (sf) | 200 m | 23.07 |
| 2015 | World Championships | Beijing, China | 6th | 4 × 100 m relay | 43.05 |

== Personal bests ==
Outdoor

- 100 metres – 11.31 (+1.6) (Edmonton 2015)
- 200 metres – 22.78 (+1.6) (Kazan 2013)
- 400 metres – 55.71 (Montreal 2009)

Indoor

- 60 metres – 7.29 (Montreal 2014)
- 200 metres – 23.79 (New York 2011)
