= Athletics at the 2011 Pan American Games – Women's 4 × 100 metres relay =

Women's 4 x 100 metres relay at the 2011 Pan American Games
- Venue: Telmex Athletics Stadium
- Dates: October 28
- Competitors: 32 from 8 nations

Medalists
Gold medal	Ana Cláudia Silva, Vanda Gomes, Franciela Krasucki, Rosângela Santos	Brazil
Silver medal	Kenyanna Wilson, Barbara Pierre, Yvette Lewis, Chastity Riggien	United States
Bronze medal	Lina Flórez, Jennifer Padilla, Yomara Hinestroza, Norma González	Colombia

The women's 4 x 100 metres relay competition of the athletics events at the 2011 Pan American Games took place on the 28th October at the Telmex Athletics Stadium. The defending Pan American Games champion were Sheri-Ann Brooks, Tracy-Ann Rowe, Aleen Bailey and Peta-Gaye Gayle of Jamaica.

== Records ==
Prior to this competition, the existing world and Pan American Games records were as follows:

World record	East Germany	41.37	Canberra, Australia	October 6, 1985
Pan American Games record	Jamaica	42.62	Winnipeg, Canada	July 30, 1999

== Qualification ==
Each National Olympic Committee (NOC) was able to enter one team.

== Schedule ==
Date	Time	Round
October 28, 2011	17:35	Final

== Results ==
All times shown are in seconds.

KEY:	q	Fastest non-qualifiers	Q	Qualified	NR	National record	PB	Personal best	SB	Seasonal best	DQ	Disqualified

=== Final ===
Held on October 28.

Rank	Nation	Athletes	Time	Notes
1st place, gold medalist(s)	Brazil	Ana Cláudia Silva, Vanda Gomes, Franciela Krasucki, Rosângela Santos	42.85	NR
2nd place, silver medalist(s)	United States	Kenyanna Wilson, Barbara Pierre, Yvette Lewis, Chastity Riggien	43.10	
3rd place, bronze medalist(s)	Colombia	Lina Flórez, Jennifer Padilla, Yomara Hinestroza, Norma González	43.44	SB
4	Cuba	Roxana Díaz, Nelkis Casabona, Grether Guillén, Dulaimi Odelín	43.97	SB
5	Canada	Kerri-Ann Mitchell, Krysha Bayley, Christian Brennan, Angela Whyte	44.33	SB
6	Ecuador	Pamela Chalá, Erika Chávez, Daniela Castillo, Celene Cevallos	46.18	NR
	Jamaica	Ornella Livingston, Anastasia Le-Roy, Simone Facey, Yanique Ellington	DNF	
	Mexico	Gabriela Santos, Jessica Sánchez, Aidé Yesenia Villarreal, Matilde Álvarez	DNF	
