= Sheniqua Ferguson =

Bahamian sprinter (born 1989)

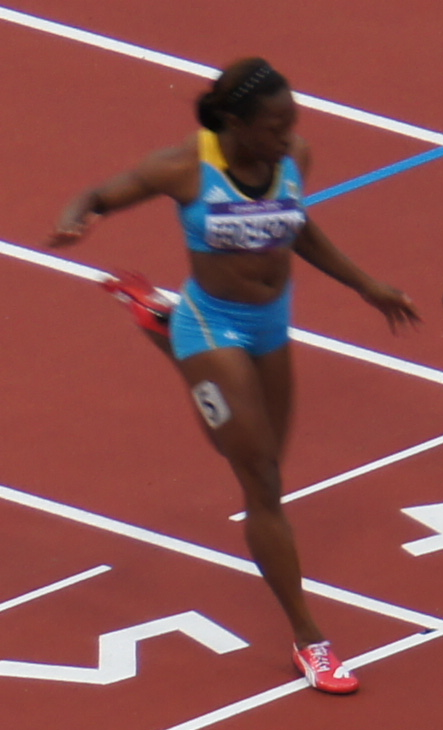
- Sheniqua Ferguson at the 2012 Summer Olympics

Personal information
- Born: 24 November 1989 (age 36) Nassau, Bahamas
- Height: 1.71 m (5 ft 7 in)
- Weight: 57 kg (126 lb)
Medal record
Women's Athletics
Representing Bahamas
World Championships
Silver medal – second place	2009 Berlin	4 x 100 m relay
World Junior Championships
Gold medal – first place	2008 Bydgoszcz	200 m
Bronze medal – third place	2008 Bydgoszcz	100 m
CAC Junior Championships (U20)
Silver medal – second place	2006 Port of Spain	100 m
Silver medal – second place	2006 Port of Spain	4x100 m relay
CARIFTA Games (Under 20)
Gold medal – first place	2006 Les Abymes	200 m
Gold medal – first place	2008 Basseterre	4x100 m relay
Silver medal – second place	2006 Les Abymes	100 m
Silver medal – second place	2006 Les Abymes	4x100 m relay
Bronze medal – third place	2008 Basseterre	100 m

Sheniqua Ferguson (born 24 November 1989) is a Bahamian sprinter who specializes in the 100 and 200 metres. She was born in Nassau. She was part of the Bahamian team that won silver in the women's 4 × 100 m at the 2009 World Championships. She was the 2008 Junior World Champion in the 200 m, and also won bronze in the 100 m that year. She competed in the 200m at the 2008 Summer Olympics. At the 2012 Olympics, she competed in the 100 m and the 4 × 100 m relay. She competed in the 100 m and the 4 × 100 m relay at the 2014 Commonwealth Games. At the 2016 Olympics, she competed in the 200 m.

Her personal best times are 11.07 seconds in the 100 metres, achieved on 21 April 2012, and 22.64 seconds in the 200 metres, achieved on 7 April 2012 in Auburn. She is also the 2010 NCAA Indoor Champion at 200 meters and 3 time SEC champ while running for Auburn University. She was coached by Henry Rolle.

== Achievements ==
Year	Competition	Venue	Position	Event	Notes
Representing the Bahamas
2006	CARIFTA Games (U-20)	Les Abymes, Guadeloupe	2nd	100 m	11.63 (0.7 m/s)
2006	CARIFTA Games (U-20)	Les Abymes, Guadeloupe	1st	200 m	23.44 (−0.8 m/s)
2006	CARIFTA Games (U-20)	Les Abymes, Guadeloupe	2nd	4x100 m relay	45.27
2006	Central American and Caribbean Junior Championships (U-20)	Port of Spain, Trinidad and Tobago	2nd	100 m	11.67 (1.0 m/s)
2006	Central American and Caribbean Junior Championships (U-20)	Port of Spain, Trinidad and Tobago	2nd	4 × 100 m relay	45.71
2006	World Junior Championships	Beijing, China	14th (sf)	100 m	11.92 (−1.8 m/s)
2006	World Junior Championships	Beijing, China	8th	200 m	24.03 (−0.9 m/s)
2006	World Junior Championships	Beijing, China	11th (h)	4 × 100 m relay	45.41
2008	CARIFTA Games (U-20)	Basseterre, Saint Kitts and Nevis	3rd	100 m	11.50 w (2.5 m/s)
2008	CARIFTA Games (U-20)	Basseterre, Saint Kitts and Nevis	1st	4 × 100 m relay	44.36 CR
2008	World Junior Championships	Bydgoszcz, Poland	3rd	100 m	11.52 (−0.6 m/s)
2008	World Junior Championships	Bydgoszcz, Poland	1st	200 m	23.24 (−0.9 m/s)
2008	World Junior Championships	Bydgoszcz, Poland	4th	4 × 100 m relay	44.61
2015	World Championships	Beijing, China	35th (h)	100 m	11.48
2015	World Championships	Beijing, China	42nd (h)	200 m	23.44
2016	Olympic Games	Rio de Janeiro, Brazil	58th (h)	200 m	23.62
