= Phylicia George =

Canadian hurdler (born 1987)

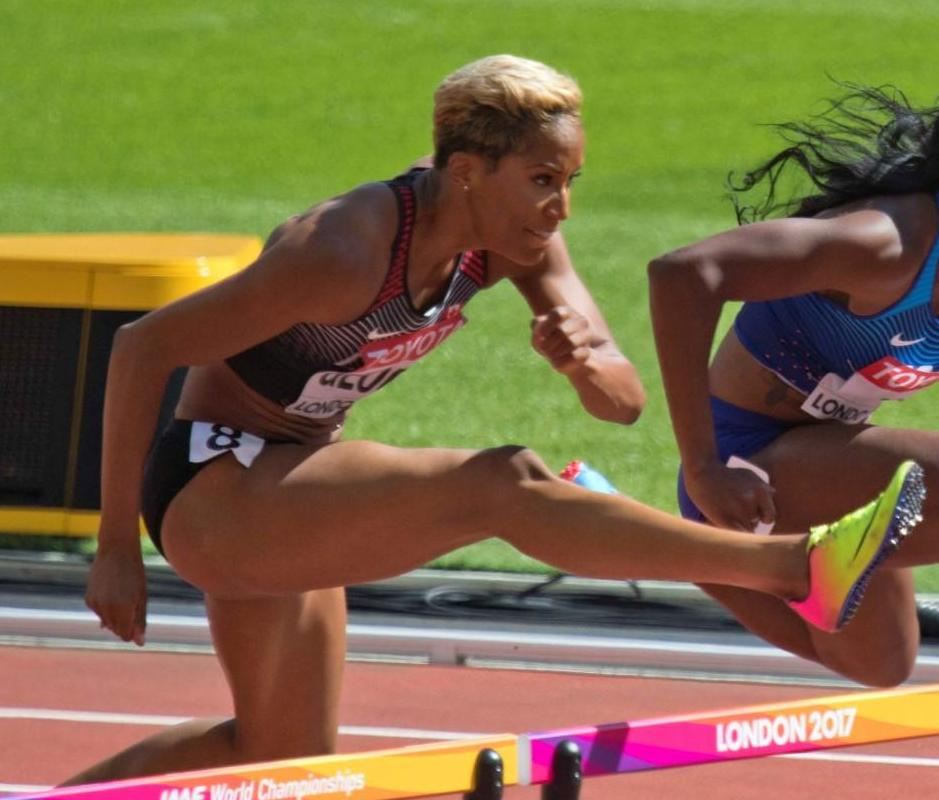
- George in 2017

Personal information
- Born: November 16, 1987 (age 38) Scarborough, Toronto, Canada
- Height: 178 cm (5 ft 10 in)
- Weight: 65 kg (143 lb)

Sport
- Country: Canada
- Sport: Athletics; Bobsleigh

Achievements and titles
- Personal bests: 100 m hurdles: 12.65 London Olympics, 2012; 100 m 11.25 Port-of-Spain, 2012; 200 m 23.10 Toronto, 2011
Medal record
Women's bobsleigh
Representing Canada
Olympic Games
| Bronze medal – third place | 2018 Pyeongchang | Two-woman |
- Updated on 21 February 2018

Phylicia George (born November 16, 1987) is a Canadian Olympic track and field athlete and bobsledder.

== Career ==
=== Hurdles ===
George competed at the 2011 World Championships in Daegu, South Korea reaching the final in the 100m hurdles. She went on to make her Olympic Games debut at the 2012 Summer Olympics and competed in the 100m hurdles, finishing in sixth place. George qualified for London, England after finishing second in the 100m hurdles just one day after winning the 100m at the Canadian Track and Field Championships in Calgary.

In July 2016 she was officially named to Canada's Olympic team. George finished eighth in the women's 100 metres hurdles event, with a time of 12.89 in the final.

=== Bobsleigh ===
In November 2016, George made the decision to compete in bobsleigh during the winter season. George made her World Cup debut in December 2017, finishing fourth with Kaillie Humphries. She won her first World Cup race on 6 January 2018 in Altenberg, Germany, with Kaillie Humphries. At the 2018 Winter Olympics in Pyeongchang, South Korea, George and Humphries won the bronze medal in the two-woman bobsleigh event.

== Achievements ==
| Year | Competition | Venue | Position | Event | Notes |
Representing Canada
| 2006 | World Junior Championships | Beijing, China | 43rd (h) | 200m | 25.07 (-1.5 m/s) |
| 2006 | World Junior Championships | Beijing, China | 10th (h) | 4 × 100 m relay | 45.26 |
| 2011 | World Championships | Daegu, South Korea | 7th | 100 m hurdles | 17.97 |
| 2012 | Olympic Games | London, United Kingdom | 5th | 100 m hurdles | 12.65 |
| 2015 | World Championships | Beijing, China | 10th (sf) | 100 m hurdles | 12.87 |
| 2016 | Olympic Games | Rio de Janeiro, Brazil | 8th | 100 m hurdles | 12.89 |
| 2016 | Olympic Games | Rio de Janeiro, Brazil | 7th | 4 × 100 m relay | 43.15 |
| 2017 | World Championships | London, United Kingdom | 15th (sf) | 100 m hurdles | 13.04 |
| 2018 | NACAC Championships | Toronto, Canada | 3rd | 4 × 100 m relay | 43.50 |
| 2019 | World Championships | Doha, Qatar | 33rd (h) | 100 m hurdles | 13.49 |
