= Maja Mihalinec Zidar =

Slovenian sprinter (born 1989)

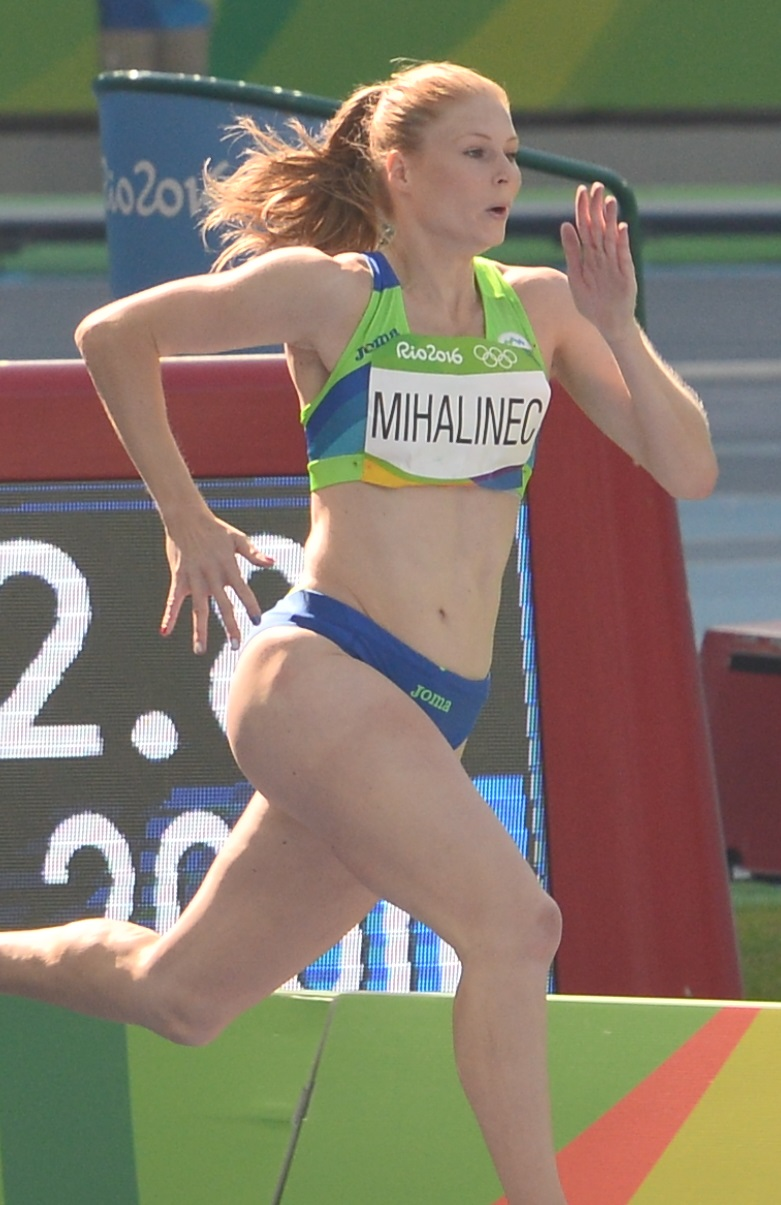
- Mihalinec at the 2016 Olympics

Personal information
- Born: Maja Mihalinec; 17 December 1989 (age 36) Mozirje, Slovenia
- Education: University of Ljubljana, University of Nebraska Omaha
- Height: 1.75 m (5 ft 9 in)
- Weight: 65 kg (143 lb)

Sport
- Sport: Athletics
- Event(s): 60 m, 100 m, 200 m, 4 × 100 m
- College team: Omaha Mavericks
- Club: AK Velenje
- Coached by: Srdjan Djordjevic
Medal record
Representing Slovenia
European Games
Gold medal – first place	2019 Minsk	100 m

Maja Mihalinec Zidar (born 17 December 1989) is a Slovenian sprinter. She competed at the 2015 World Championships in Athletics, 2016 World Indoor Championships, 2016 Olympics and 2019 World Championships in Athletics.

== Personal life ==
Mihalinec's mother Damijana is a volleyball coach and former player, and her younger sister Katja played volleyball internationally. Maja also started with volleyball, but her physical education teacher persuaded her to take up athletics. For some time she trained in both sports, but then chose running. Her partner Luka Zidar is a competitive high jumper.

Mihalinec studied social sciences at the University of Ljubljana and communications at the University of Nebraska Omaha. In 2015, she was named Female Athlete of the Year by the Athletic Federation of Slovenia.

== Competition record ==
Year	Competition	Venue	Position	Event	Notes
Representing Slovenia
2005	World Youth Championships	Marrakesh, Morocco	28th (h)	100 m	12.03
2005	World Youth Championships	Marrakesh, Morocco	18th (sf)	200 m	24.62 (w)
2005	European Youth Olympic Festival	Lignano Sabbiadoro, Italy	6th (B)	100 m	12.31 (w)
2005	European Youth Olympic Festival	Lignano Sabbiadoro, Italy	5th	4 × 100 m	47.59
2006	World Junior Championships	Beijing, China	43rd (h)	100 m	12.08
2006	World Junior Championships	Beijing, China	–	200 m	DQ
2006	World Junior Championships	Beijing, China	16th (h)	4 × 100 m	46.09
2007	European Junior Championships	Hengelo, Netherlands	12th (sf)	100 m	11.89
2007	European Junior Championships	Hengelo, Netherlands	11th (h)	4 × 100 m	46.23
2008	World Junior Championships	Bydgoszcz, Poland	17th (sf)	100 m	11.81
2014	European Championships	Zurich, Switzerland	25th (h)	100 m	11.52
2015	European Indoor Championships	Prague, Czech Republic	16th (sf)	60 m	7.29
2015	World Championships	Beijing, China	32nd (h)	100 m	11.42
2015	World Championships	Beijing, China	19th (sf)	200 m	23.04
2016	World Indoor Championships	Portland, United States	20th (sf)	60 m	7.34
2016	European Championships	Amsterdam, Netherlands	15th (sf)	100 m	11.55
2016	European Championships	Amsterdam, Netherlands	10th (sf)	200 m	23.17
2016	Olympic Games	Rio de Janeiro, Brazil	48th (h)	200 m	23.38
2019	European Indoor Championships	Glasgow, United Kingdom	6th	60 m	7.21
2019	World Championships	Doha, Qatar	25th (h)	100 m	11.32
2019	World Championships	Doha, Qatar	12th (sf)	200 m	22.81
2021	European Indoor Championships	Toruń, Poland	5th	60 m	7.26
2021	Olympic Games	Tokyo, Japan	44th (h)	100 m	11.54
2021	Olympic Games	Tokyo, Japan	35th (h)	200 m	23.62
2025	European Indoor Championships	Apeldoorn, Netherlands	25th (h)	60 m	7.27
2025	World Indoor Championships	Nanjing, China	32nd (h)	60 m	7.40

== Personal bests ==
Outdoor

- 100 metres – 11.27 (+1.1 m/s, Padova 2019)
- 200 metres – 22.78 (+0.7 m/s, Doha 2019)

Indoor

- 60 metres – 7.21 (Glasgow 2019)
- 200 metres – 23.47 (Vienna 2015)
