= Augusto Stanley =

Paraguayan sprinter (born 1987)

Personal information
- Born: August 3, 1987 (age 38) Benjamín Aráoz, Tucumán Province, Argentina
- Height: 1.89 m (6 ft 2 in)
- Weight: 80 kg (180 lb)

Sport
- Country: Paraguay
- Sport: Athletics
- Event: 400m

Augusto Stanley (born 3 August 1987 in Benjamín Aráoz, Tucumán, Argentina) is a Paraguayan sprinter. At the 2012 Summer Olympics, he competed in the Men's 400 metres.
