= Jorge (footballer, born 1939) =

Brazilian footballer

Personal information
- Full name: Jorge dos Santos
- Date of birth: 21 April 1939
- Place of birth: São Paulo, Brazil
- Date of death: 25 February 2018 (aged 78)
- Place of death: São Paulo, Brazil
- Position: Right back

Senior career*
Years	Team	Apps	(Gls)
1957–1962	Palmeiras	182	(0)
- * Club domestic league appearances and goals as of 3 February 2024

Jorge dos Santos (21 April 1939 – 25 February 2018), was a Brazilian professional footballer who played as a right back.

== Career ==
A defensive right-back, Jorge was Djalma Santos immediate backup during the start of the "Primeira Academia" team. He made 182 appearances for the club, winning the state championship in 1959 and the Taça Brasil in 1960.

== Honours ==
Palmeiras

- Campeonato Paulista: 1959
- Taça Brasil: 1960

== Death ==
Jorge died on 25 February 2018 in São Paulo, aged 78, a victim of multiple organ failure.
