= Chen Jue (athlete) =

Chinese sprinter (born 1988)

Chen Jue (Chinese: 陈珏; born 23 March 1988 in Suzhou, Jiangsu) is a Chinese sprinter who specializes in the 200 metres.

At the 2006 Asian Games she finished seventh in the 200 metres and won a gold medal in the 4 × 100 m relay.

She was the back-up runner for the 4 × 100 metres relay event at the 2008 Summer Olympics. She won the silver in the relay event for Jiangsu at the 11th Chinese National Games in 2009 with Jiang Lan also part of the team.

Her personal best time is 23.52 seconds, achieved in July 2004 in Beijing. In the 100 metres she has 11.50 seconds, achieved in October 2007 in Wuhan.
