= Wang Jing (athlete) =

Chinese sprinter (born 1988)

Personal information
- Nationality: Chinese
- Born: Wang Jing; March 26, 1988 (age 37) Sha, Fujian, China

Sport
- Sport: Running
- Event: 100 metres

Wang Jing (Chinese: 王静, born March 26, 1988, in Sha, Fujian) is a female Chinese athletics sprinter.

Wang represented China at the 2008 Summer Olympics in Beijing competing at the 100 metres sprint. In her first round heat she placed fifth in a time of 11.87 which was not enough to advance to the second round. Together with Tao Yujia, Jiang Lan and Qin Wangping she also took part in the 4 × 100 metres relay. In their first round heat they placed fourth behind Jamaica, Russia and Germany. Their time of 43.78 seconds was the tenth time overall out of sixteen participating nations. With this result they failed to qualify for the final.

After winning the 100 metres title at the 11th Chinese National Games, Wang tested positive for doping. The Chinese Athletic Association banned her for four years from competition and a lifetime from the national squad.

== Personal best ==
- 2006 Asian Championships - 3rd 100 m

== See also ==
- List of doping cases in athletics
