= Vanda Gomes =

Brazilian sprinter (born 1988)

Personal information
- Born: 7 November 1988 (age 37) Matelândia, Paraná, Brazil

Sport
- Sport: Track and field
Medal record
Representing Brazil
Pan American Games
Gold medal – first place	2011 Guadalajara	4x100m relay
South American Games
Gold medal – first place	2010 Medellin	4x100m relay
Silver medal – second place	2010 Medellin	200m
Bronze medal – third place	2006 Buenos Aires	200m
World Youth Championships
Bronze medal – third place	2005 Beijing	Medley relay
World Junior Championships
Silver medal – second place	2006 Beijing	200m

Vanda Ferreira Gomes (born 7 November 1988) is a Brazilian former athlete who specialised in the sprinting events. She won the silver medal in the 200 metres at the 2006 World Junior Championships. She had personal bests of 11.64 in the 100 metres (2012) and 23.06 in the 200 metres (2008).

She was banned from competition for two years due to a failed out-of-competition doping test on 25 September 2014. The ban ended two years later on 24 September 2016.

== Competition record ==
Year	Competition	Venue	Position	Event	Notes
Representing Brazil
2005	World Youth Championships	Beijing, China	5th	200 m	23.73
2005	World Youth Championships	Beijing, China	3rd	Medley relay	2:06.60
2005	Pan American Junior Championships	Windsor, Canada	12th (h)	200 m	24.42 (w)
2005	Pan American Junior Championships	Windsor, Canada	3rd	4x100 m relay	45.75
2006	World Junior Championships	Beijing, China	2nd	200 m	23.59 (wind: -0.9 m/s)
2006	World Junior Championships	Beijing, China	4th	4x100 m relay	44.45
2006	South American Championships	Tunja, Colombia	3rd	200 m	23.76
2006	South American Championships	Tunja, Colombia	1st	4x100 m relay	44.72
2006	South American U23 Championships	Buenos Aires, Argentina	3rd	200 m	23.80 (wind: +1.7 m/s)
2008	Ibero-American Championships	Iquique, Chile	4th	200 m	23.99
2008	South American U23 Championships	Lima, Peru	2nd	200 m	24.88
2008	South American U23 Championships	Lima, Peru	1st	4x100 m relay	45.76
2009	Lusophony Games	Lisbon, Portugal	3rd	200 m	23.91 (w)
2009	World Championships	Berlin, Germany	5th	4x100 m relay	43.13
2010	South American Games (South American U23 Championships)	Medellín, Colombia	2nd	200 m	23.82
2010	South American Games (South American U23 Championships)	Medellín, Colombia	1st	4x100 m relay	44.47
2010	Ibero-American Championships	San Fernando, Spain	1st	4x100 m relay	43.97
2011	South American Championships	Buenos Aires, Argentina	2nd	4x100 m relay	44.56
2011	World Championships	Daegu, South Korea	28th (h)	200 m	23.70
2011	World Championships	Daegu, South Korea	7th	4x100 m relay	43.10
2011	Pan American Games	Guadalajara, Mexico	11th (h)	200 m	23.89
2011	Pan American Games	Guadalajara, Mexico	1st	4x100 m relay	42.85
2013	World Championships	Moscow, Russia	7th	4x100 m relay	DNF

== See also ==
- List of doping cases in athletics
