= Gabby Mayo =

American sprinter (born 1989)

Personal information
- Born: January 26, 1989 (age 37) Raleigh, North Carolina, U.S.

Sport
- Sport: Running
- Event: 100 metres
- College team: Texas A&M Aggies

Achievements and titles
- Personal best: 100m h: 11.13 (Austin 2010)
Medal record
Women's athletics
Representing the United States
World Junior Championships
Gold medal – first place	2006 Beijing	4×100 m relay
Silver medal – second place	2006 Beijing	100 m

Gabrielle Montoya Mayo (born January 26, 1989) is an American sprinter who specializes in the 100 metres. She attended Texas A&M University.

A native of Raleigh, North Carolina, Mayo attended Southeast Raleigh Magnet High School. She won a silver and a gold medal at the 2006 World Junior Championships in Athletics. She was Track and Field News "High School Athlete of the Year" in 2006. Mayo was also honored as the 2006–07 NCHSAA Female Athlete of the Year.

Mayo was part of a US 4 × 100 m relay squad that established the second fastest Jr time over that distance. It was the World Jr Record at the time.

Awards
Preceded by Ebony Collins	USA Track & Field Youth Athlete of the Year; 2006	Succeeded by William Wynne
