= 2008 World Junior Championships in Athletics – Women's 4 × 100 metres relay =

The women's 4×100 metres relay event at the 2008 World Junior Championships in Athletics was held in Bydgoszcz, Poland, at Zawisza Stadium on 11 and 12 July.

== Medalists ==
Gold	Jeneba Tarmoh; Shayla Mahan; Gabrielle Glenn; Tiffany Townsend; United States
Silver	Shawna Anderson; Kaycea Jones; Gayon Evans; Jura Levy; Jamaica
Bronze	Bárbara de Oliveira; Bárbara Leôncio; Luana Correa; Rosângela Santos; Brazil

== Results ==
=== Final ===
12 July

Rank	Nation	Competitors	Time	Notes
1st place, gold medalist(s)	United States	Jeneba Tarmoh; Shayla Mahan; Gabrielle Glenn; Tiffany Townsend	43.66	
2nd place, silver medalist(s)	Jamaica	Shawna Anderson; Kaycea Jones; Gayon Evans; Jura Levy	43.98	
3rd place, bronze medalist(s)	Brazil	Bárbara de Oliveira; Bárbara Leôncio; Luana Correa; Rosângela Santos	44.61	
4	Bahamas	Sheniqua Ferguson; Krystal Bodie; Tia Rolle; Nivea Smith	44.61	
5	France	Orlann Ombissa; Emilie Gaydu; Wendy Pascal; Cornnelly Calydon	45.02	
6	Saint Kitts and Nevis	Marecia Pemberton; Meritzer Williams; Sheriffa Whyte; Tameka Williams	45.10	
7	Barbados	Tameka Rawlins; Mara Weekes; Sade Greene; Kierre Beckles	45.36	
8	Switzerland	Marisa Lavanchy; Jacqueline Gasser; Grace Muamba; Valentine Arrieta	45.51	

=== Heats ===
11 July

==== Heat 1 ====
Rank	Nation	Competitors	Time	Notes
1	United States	Jeneba Tarmoh; Shayla Mahan; Gabrielle Glenn; Tiffany Townsend	43.76	Q
2	Brazil	Bárbara de Oliveira; Bárbara Leôncio; Luana Correa; Rosângela Santos	44.25	Q
3	Bahamas	V'Alonnee Robinson; Sheniqua Ferguson; Tia Rolle; Nivea Smith	44.32	q
4	Saint Kitts and Nevis	Marecia Pemberton; Meritzer Williams; Sheriffa Whyte; Tameka Williams	44.45	q
5	Poland	Justyna Rybak; Weronika Wedler; Aleksandra Kociołek; Anna Kiełbasińska	44.73	
6	Netherlands	Kadene Vassell; Loreanne Kuhurima; Janice Babel; Jamile Samuel	45.21	
7	Canada	Natalie Geiger; Kimberley Hyacinthe; Alyssa Johnson; Chantal Grant	45.66	
8	Thailand	Kamonch Sornplod; Sintara Seangdee; Tassporn Wannakit; Athchima Engchuan	45.99	

==== Heat 2 ====
Rank	Nation	Competitors	Time	Notes
1	Jamaica	Danielle Jeffrey; Kaycea Jones; Gayon Evans; Shawna Anderson	44.55	Q
2	Switzerland	Marisa Lavanchy; Jacqueline Gasser; Grace Muamba; Valentine Arrieta	45.57	Q
3	Italy	Ilenia Draisci; Martina Balboni; Sabrina Mutschlechner; Marta Maffioletti	45.64	
4	Ireland	Joan Healy; Steffi Creaner; Hannah Lewis; Mairead Murphy	45.93	
5	Sweden	Caroline Lundahl; Isabelle Eurenius; Linnéa Collin; Louise Kronlund	46.58	
	Australia	Larissa Perry; Melissa Breen; Olivia Tauro; Brittney McGlone	DQ	IAAF rule 170.14
	United Kingdom	Elaine O'Neill; Holly Croxford; Anike Shand-Whittingham; Ashleigh Nelson	DNF	

==== Heat 3 ====
Rank	Nation	Competitors	Time	Notes
1	Barbados	Tameka Rawlins; Mara Weekes; Sade Greene; Kierre Beckles	44.79	Q
2	France	Orlann Ombissa; Emilie Gaydu; Wendy Pascal; Cornnelly Calydon	44.96	Q
3	Germany	Yasmin Kwadwo; Lara Hoffmann; Zsuzsanna Zimanyi; Ruth Spelmeyer	44.98	
4	Russia	Irina Kasatkina; Olga Belkina; Yekaterina Filatova; Alena Tamkova	45.15	
5	Nigeria	Justina Sule; Susan Akene; Gloria Bassey; Agnes Osazuwa	45.30	
6	Spain	Shannon García; Estela García; Carmen Sánchez; Alba Obesso	45.88	
7	South Africa	Celeste Rietels; Alyssa Conley; Christy Coetzee; Claudia Viljoen	46.37	
8	Serbia	Marijela Markovic; Mila Andrić; Andrijana Andric; Angela Terek	47.73	

== Participation ==
According to an unofficial count, 94 athletes from 23 countries participated in the event.

- Australia (4)
- Bahamas (5)
- Barbados (4)
- Brazil (4)
- Canada (4)
- France (4)
- Germany (4)
- Ireland (4)
- Italy (4)
- Jamaica (5)
- Netherlands (4)
- Nigeria (4)
- Poland (4)
- Russia (4)
- Saint Kitts and Nevis (4)
- Serbia (4)
- South Africa (4)
- Spain (4)
- Sweden (4)
- Switzerland (4)
- Thailand (4)
- United Kingdom (4)
- United States (4)
