= 2011 European Athletics U23 Championships – Women's 100 metres =

The women's 100 metres at the 2011 European Athletics U23 Championships were held at the Městský stadion on 14 and 15 July.

== Medalists ==
Gold	Andreea Ograzeanu; Romania (ROU)
Silver	Leena Günther; Germany (GER)
Bronze	Anna Kielbasińska; Poland (POL)

Note: Darya Pizhankova of Ukraine originally won the gold medal but was later found guilty of doping offence and stripped of it.

== Schedule ==
Date	Time	Round
14 July 2011	10:20	Round 1
14 July 2011	17:25	Semifinals
15 July 2011	16:10	Final

== Results ==
=== Heats ===
Qualification: First 3 in each heat (Q) and 4 best performers (q) advance to the Semifinals.

==== Heat 1 ====
Rank	Heat	Name	Nationality	React	Time	Notes
1	1	Andreea Ograzeanu	Romania	0.224	11.55	Q
2	4	Anna Kielbasińska	Poland	0.172	11.58	Q
3	3	Émilie Gaydu	France	0.197	11.60	Q
4	2	Leena Günther	Germany	0.170	11.64	Q
5	3	Folake Akinyemi	Norway	0.161	11.67	Q, SB
6	1	Jessie Saint-Marc	France	0.197	11.68	Q
7	3	Kadene Vassell	Netherlands	0.188	11.72	Q
8	1	Anouk Hagen	Netherlands	0.144	11.77	Q
9	4	Yekaterina Filatova	Russia	0.177	11.78	Q, SB
10	4	Ilenia Draisci	Italy	0.154	11.78	q
11	2	Marina Pantaleyeva	Russia	0.190	11.80	Q
12	2	Viktoriya Pyatachenko	Ukraine	0.181	11.81	Q
13	3	Alazne Furundarena	Spain	0.190	11.85	q
14	4	Ramona Papaioannou	Cyprus	0.194	11.86	q
15	3	Małgorzata Kołdej	Poland	0.211	11.87	q
16	4	Niamh Whelan	Ireland	0.154	11.89	
17	1	Paula Suchowiecka	Poland	0.217	11.94	
18	1	Viktoriya Yarushkina	Russia	0.192	11.94	
19	2	Orlann Ombissa	France	0.157	12.02	
20	2	Estela García	Spain	0.216	12.03	
21	3	María Gátou	Greece	0.228	12.06	
22	2	Petra Urbánková	Czech Republic	0.190	12.08	
23	1	Diane Borg	Malta	0.174	12.11	
24	1	Ivana Rožman	Macedonia	0.168	12.57	
	4	Darya Pizhankova	Ukraine	0.238	DQ	

=== Semifinals ===
First 3 in each semifinal and 2 best performers advance to the Final.

==== Semifinal 1 ====
Rank	Heat	Name	Nationality	React	Time	Notes
1	2	Andreea Ograzeanu	Romania	0.219	11.49	Q
2	2	Leena Günther	Germany	0.182	11.58	Q
3	1	Anna Kielbasińska	Poland	0.191	11.66	Q
4	2	Yekaterina Filatova	Russia	0.173	11.71	q, SB
5	1	Viktoriya Pyatachenko	Ukraine	0.184	11.73	Q
6	1	Émilie Gaydu	France	0.214	11.74	Q
7	1	Marina Pantaleyeva	Russia	0.197	11.75	
7	2	Jessie Saint-Marc	France	0.178	11.75	q
9	1	Folake Akinyemi	Norway	0.203	11.77	
10	2	Ilenia Draisci	Italy	0.163	11.79	
11	2	Kadene Vassell	Netherlands	0.195	11.89	
12	1	Ramona Papaioannou	Cyprus	0.194	11.94	
13	2	Małgorzata Kołdej	Poland	0.191	11.97	
14	1	Alazne Furundarena	Spain	0.193	11.99	
15	1	Anouk Hagen	Netherlands	0.213	12.03	
	2	Darya Pizhankova	Ukraine	0.158	DQ	

=== Final ===
Rank	Name	Nationality	React	Time	Notes
1st place, gold medalist(s)	Andreea Ograzeanu	Romania	0.193	11.65	
2nd place, silver medalist(s)	Leena Günther	Germany	0.193	11.75	
3rd place, bronze medalist(s)	Anna Kielbasińska	Poland	0.162	11.77	
4	Émilie Gaydu	France	0.182	11.79	
5	Viktoriya Pyatachenko	Ukraine	0.182	11.90	
6	Yekaterina Filatova	Russia	0.190	12.01	
7	Jessie Saint-Marc	France	0.164	32.85	
	Darya Pizhankova	Ukraine	0.190	DQ	

== Participation ==
According to an unofficial count, 25 athletes from 16 countries participated in the event.

- Cyprus (1)
- Czech Republic (1)
- France (3)
- Germany (1)
- Greece (1)
- Ireland (1)
- Italy (1)
- North Macedonia (1)
- Malta (1)
- Netherlands (2)
- Norway (1)
- Poland (3)
- Romania (1)
- Russia (3)
- Spain (2)
- Ukraine (2)
