= 2008 World Junior Championships in Athletics – Women's 100 metres =

The women's 100 metres event at the 2008 World Junior Championships in Athletics was held in Bydgoszcz, Poland, at Zawisza Stadium on 8 and 9 July.

== Medalists ==
Gold	Jeneba Tarmoh; United States
Silver	Ashleigh Nelson; United Kingdom
Bronze	Sheniqua Ferguson; Bahamas

== Results ==
=== Final ===
9 July
Wind: -0.6 m/s

Rank	Name	Nationality	Time	Notes
1st place, gold medalist(s)	Jeneba Tarmoh	United States	11.37	
2nd place, silver medalist(s)	Ashleigh Nelson	United Kingdom	11.49	
3rd place, bronze medalist(s)	Sheniqua Ferguson	Bahamas	11.52	
4	Rosângela Santos	Brazil	11.63	
5	Shayla Mahan	United States	11.66	
6	Andreea Ogrăzeanu	Romania	11.67	
7	Meritzer Williams	Saint Kitts and Nevis	11.82	
	Mariya Serkova	Russia	DNS	

=== Semifinals ===
8 July

==== Semifinal 1 ====
Wind: 0.0 m/s

Rank	Name	Nationality	Time	Notes
1	Sheniqua Ferguson	Bahamas	11.56	Q
2	Shayla Mahan	United States	11.66	Q
3	Melissa Breen	Australia	11.70	
4	Emilie Gaydu	France	11.76	
5	Gabriela Laleva	Bulgaria	11.81	
6	Folake Akinyemi	Norway	11.81	
7	Shawna Anderson	Jamaica	11.84	
8	Tameka Williams	Saint Kitts and Nevis	11.99	

==== Semifinal 2 ====
Wind: -0.7 m/s

Rank	Name	Nationality	Time	Notes
1	Ashleigh Nelson	United Kingdom	11.43	Q
2	Meritzer Williams	Saint Kitts and Nevis	11.58	Q
3	Agnes Osazuwa	Nigeria	11.68	
4	Janelle Redhead	Grenada	11.71	
5	Yasmin Kwadwo	Germany	11.75	
6	Bárbara Leôncio	Brazil	11.76	
7	Jamile Samuel	Netherlands	11.79	
8	Maja Mihalinec	Slovenia	11.81	

==== Semifinal 3 ====
Wind: -0.5 m/s

Rank	Name	Nationality	Time	Notes
1	Jeneba Tarmoh	United States	11.38	Q
2	Rosângela Santos	Brazil	11.51	Q
3	Andreea Ogrăzeanu	Romania	11.54	q
4	Mariya Serkova	Russia	11.60	q
5	Elaine O'Neill	United Kingdom	11.75	
6	Kaycea Jones	Jamaica	11.86	
7	Loreanne Kuhurima	Netherlands	11.94	
8	Constance Mkenku	South Africa	12.13	

=== Heats ===
8 July

==== Heat 1 ====
Wind: -1.9 m/s

Rank	Name	Nationality	Time	Notes
1	Ashleigh Nelson	United Kingdom	11.55	Q
2	Andreea Ogrăzeanu	Romania	11.85	Q
3	Niamh Whelan	Ireland	11.96	
4	Anne Zagré	Belgium	11.98	
5	Weronika Wedler	Poland	12.02	
6	Isabelle Eurenius	Sweden	12.19	
7	Yekaterina Filatova	Russia	12.28	
8	Alba Obesso	Spain	12.31	

==== Heat 2 ====
Wind: -0.1 m/s

Rank	Name	Nationality	Time	Notes
1	Jeneba Tarmoh	United States	11.56	Q
2	Bárbara Leôncio	Brazil	11.80	Q
3	Loreanne Kuhurima	Netherlands	11.83	q
4	Cornnelly Calydon	France	11.98	
5	Estela García	Spain	12.03	
6	Jasmin Showlah	Finland	12.08	
7	Olga Bludova	Kazakhstan	12.57	
8	Dana Thoma	Nauru	13.80	
9	Tahmina Kohistani	Afghanistan	15.00	

==== Heat 3 ====
Wind: -1.9 m/s

Rank	Name	Nationality	Time	Notes
1	Elaine O'Neill	United Kingdom	12.00	Q
2	Tameka Williams	Saint Kitts and Nevis	12.10	Q
3	Nelcy Caicedo	Colombia	12.12	
4	Yelizaveta Bryzhina	Ukraine	12.21	
5	Susan Akene	Nigeria	12.35	
6	Alja Sitar	Slovenia	12.38	
7	Osiris Morales	Puerto Rico	12.43	
8	Kirsten Niuwendam	Suriname	12.76	

==== Heat 4 ====
Wind: -3.3 m/s

Rank	Name	Nationality	Time	Notes
1	Janelle Redhead	Grenada	11.76	Q
2	Meritzer Williams	Saint Kitts and Nevis	11.76	Q
3	Rosângela Santos	Brazil	11.78	q
4	Tameka Rawlins	Barbados	12.10	
5	Chantal Grant	Canada	12.20	
6	Viktorya Pyatachenko	Ukraine	12.26	
7	Vanina Nguen	Bulgaria	12.35	
8	Ivana Rožman	North Macedonia	12.96	

==== Heat 5 ====
Wind: -0.8 m/s

Rank	Name	Nationality	Time	Notes
1	Sheniqua Ferguson	Bahamas	11.59	Q
2	Melissa Breen	Australia	11.66	Q
3	Maja Mihalinec	Slovenia	11.72	q
4	Shawna Anderson	Jamaica	11.83	q
5	Folake Akinyemi	Norway	11.87	q
6	Allison Peter	U.S. Virgin Islands	12.16	
7	Jenna Jokela	Finland	12.20	

==== Heat 6 ====
Wind: -1.2 m/s

Rank	Name	Nationality	Time	Notes
1	Agnes Osazuwa	Nigeria	11.68	Q
2	Emilie Gaydu	France	11.69	Q
3	Jamile Samuel	Netherlands	11.80	q
4	Kaycea Jones	Jamaica	11.89	q
5	Sergine Kouanga	Cameroon	11.94	
6	Asuka Terada	Japan	12.53	
7	Kai Selvon	Trinidad and Tobago	12.56	
	Souheir Bouali	Algeria	DQ	IAAF rule 162.7

==== Heat 7 ====
Wind: -1.6 m/s

Rank	Name	Nationality	Time	Notes
1	Mariya Serkova	Russia	11.63	Q
2	Gabriela Laleva	Bulgaria	11.85	Q
3	Nadja Bahl	Germany	11.97	
4	Martina Balboni	Italy	12.01	
5	Sintara Seangdee	Thailand	12.03	
6	Joan Healy	Ireland	12.05	
7	Ewa Zarębska	Poland	12.09	
8	Leung Hau Sze	Hong Kong	12.76	

==== Heat 8 ====
Wind: -1.9 m/s

Rank	Name	Nationality	Time	Notes
1	Shayla Mahan	United States	11.61	Q
2	Constance Mkenku	South Africa	11.69	Q
3	Yasmin Kwadwo	Germany	11.90	q
4	Ilenia Draisci	Italy	12.02	
5	Caroline Lundahl	Sweden	12.05	
6	Tia Rolle	Bahamas	12.29	
7	Lin Wen-Wen	Chinese Taipei	12.33	
8	Yelena Ryabova	Turkmenistan	13.22	
9	Shirley Vunatup	Papua New Guinea	13.58	

== Participation ==
According to an unofficial count, 65 athletes from 45 countries participated in the event.

- Afghanistan (1)
- Algeria (1)
- Australia (1)
- Bahamas (2)
- Barbados (1)
- Belgium (1)
- Brazil (2)
- Bulgaria (2)
- Cameroon (1)
- Canada (1)
- Chinese Taipei (1)
- Colombia (1)
- Finland (2)
- France (2)
- Germany (2)
- Grenada (1)
- Hong Kong (1)
- Ireland (2)
- Italy (2)
- Jamaica (2)
- Japan (1)
- Kazakhstan (1)
- North Macedonia (1)
- Nauru (1)
- Netherlands (2)
- Nigeria (2)
- Norway (1)
- Papua New Guinea (1)
- Poland (2)
- Puerto Rico (1)
- Romania (1)
- Russia (2)
- Saint Kitts and Nevis (2)
- Slovenia (2)
- South Africa (1)
- Spain (2)
- Suriname (1)
- Sweden (2)
- Thailand (1)
- Trinidad and Tobago (1)
- Turkmenistan (1)
- Ukraine (2)
- United Kingdom (2)
- United States (2)
- U.S. Virgin Islands (1)
