= 2011 European Athletics U23 Championships – Women's 4 × 100 metres relay =

The Women's 4×100 metres relay event at the 2011 European Athletics U23 Championships was held in Ostrava, Czech Republic, at Městský stadion on 17 July.

== Medalists ==
Gold	Yekaterina Filatova; Alena Tamkova; Yekaterina Kuzina; Nina Argunova; Russia
Silver	Yariatou Touré; Sarah Goujon; Orlann Ombissa; Cornnelly Calydon; Émilie Gaydu^{†} France
Bronze	Annabelle Lewis; Emily Diamond; Torema Thompson; Asha Philip; United Kingdom

^{†}: Competed only in heat.

== Results ==
=== Final ===
17 July 2011 / 17:10

Rank	Name	Nationality	Lane	Reaction Time	Time	Notes
1st place, gold medalist(s)	Russia	Yekaterina Filatova; Alena Tamkova; Yekaterina Kuzina; Nina Argunova	7	0.224	44.14	
2nd place, silver medalist(s)	France	Yariatou Touré; Sarah Goujon; Orlann Ombissa; Cornnelly Calydon	6	0.181	44.26	
3rd place, bronze medalist(s)	United Kingdom	Annabelle Lewis; Emily Diamond; Torema Thompson; Asha Philip	5	0.192	44.34	
4	Italy	Martina Balboni; Michaela D'Angelo; Martina Amidei; Ilenia Draisci	8	0.195	44.41	
5	Netherlands	Nikki van Leeuwen; Anouk Hagen; Judith Bosker; Kadene Vassell	1	0.132	44.61	
6	Poland	Ewa Zarębska; Małgorzata Kołdej; Martyna Opoń; Anna Kiełbasińska	3	0.177	44.67	
7	Czech Republic	Petra Urbánková; Jana Slaninová; Jana Branišová; Barbora Procházková	2	0.201	45.31	
	Ukraine	Olena Yanovska; Darya Pizhankova; Viktoriya Pyatachenko; Ulyana Lepska	4	0.214	DQ	R 32.2.a Doping^{†}

^{†}: Ukraine ranked initially 1st (44.00), but was disqualified later for infringement of IAAF doping rules by team members Darya Pizhankova and Ulyana Lepska.

=== Heats ===
Qualified: First 3 in each heat (Q) and 2 best performers (q) advance to the Final

==== Summary ====
Rank	Nation	Time	Notes
1	France	44.14	Q
2	United Kingdom	44.42	Q
	Ukraine	DQ	R 32.2.a Doping^{†}
3	Russia	44.61	Q
4	Poland	44.68	Q
5	Italy	44.73	Q
6	Netherlands	44.94	q
7	Czech Republic	45.28	q
	Switzerland	DNF	

^{†}: Ukraine initially reached the final (44.56), but was disqualified later for infringement of IAAF doping rules by team members Darya Pizhankova and Ulyana Lepska.

==== Details ====
===== Heat 1 =====
17 July 2011 / 15:20

Rank	Nation	Competitors	Lane	Reaction Time	Time	Notes
1	United Kingdom	Annabelle Lewis; Emily Diamond; Torema Thompson; Asha Philip	3	0.150	44.42	Q
	Ukraine	Olena Yanovska; Darya Pizhankova; Viktoriya Pyatachenko; Ulyana Lepska	2	0.208	DQ	R 32.2.a Doping^{†}
2	Russia	Yekaterina Filatova; Alena Tamkova; Yekaterina Kuzina; Nina Argunova	4	0.220	44.61	Q
3	Netherlands	Nikki van Leeuwen; Anouk Hagen; Judith Bosker; Kadene Vassell	5	0.163	44.94	q

^{†}: Ukraine initially reached the final (44.56), but was disqualified later for infringement of IAAF doping rules by team members Darya Pizhankova and Ulyana Lepska.

===== Heat 2 =====
17 July 2011 / 15:27

Rank	Nation	Competitors	Lane	Reaction Time	Time	Notes
1	France	Yariatou Touré; Cornnelly Calydon; Sarah Goujon; Émilie Gaydu	5	0.178	44.14	Q
2	Poland	Ewa Zarębska; Małgorzata Kołdej; Martyna Opoń; Anna Kiełbasińska	6	0.167	44.68	Q
3	Italy	Martina Balboni; Michaela D'Angelo; Martina Amidei; Ilenia Draisci	2	0.163	44.73	Q
4	Czech Republic	Petra Urbánková; Jana Slaninová; Jana Branišová; Barbora Procházková	4	0.172	45.28	q
	Switzerland	Joelle Curti; Jacqueline Gasser; Marisa Lavanchy; Aurélie Humair	3	0.163	DNF	

== Participation ==
According to an unofficial count, 37 athletes from 9 countries participated in the event.

- Czech Republic (4)
- France (5)
- Italy (4)
- Netherlands (4)
- Poland (4)
- Russia (4)
- Switzerland (4)
- Ukraine (4)
- United Kingdom (4)
