= Niamh Whelan =

Irish sprinter

Personal information
- Born: 26 July 1990 (age 35)
- Education: University of Limerick
- Height: 1.56 m (5 ft 1 in)
- Weight: 52 kg (115 lb)

Sport
- Sport: Athletics
- Event(s): 100 m, 200 m
- Club: Ferrybank A.C.

Niamh Annette Whelan (born 26 July 1990) is an Irish sprinter She represented her country at two outdoor and one indoor European Championships.

== International competitions ==
Year	Competition	Venue	Position	Event	Notes
Representing Ireland
2007	European Youth Olympic Festival	Belgrade, Serbia	3rd	100 m	11.87
2007	European Youth Olympic Festival	Belgrade, Serbia	8th	200 m	24.64
2008	World Junior Championships	Bydgoszcz, Poland	24th (h)	100 m	11.96
2008	World Junior Championships	Bydgoszcz, Poland	19th (sf)	200 m	24.24
2009	European Indoor Championships	Turin, Italy	21st (h)	60 m	7.49
2009	European Junior Championships	Novi Sad, Serbia	4th	100 m	11.63
2009	European Junior Championships	Novi Sad, Serbia	7th	200 m	24.37 (w)
2009	European Junior Championships	Novi Sad, Serbia	7th	4 × 100 m relay	46.61
2010	European Championships	Barcelona, Spain	11th (sf)	100 m	23.31
2010	European Championships	Barcelona, Spain	9th (h)	4 × 100 m relay	43.93
2011	European U23 Championships	Ostrava, Czech Republic	16th (h)	100 m	11.89
2011	European U23 Championships	Ostrava, Czech Republic	11th (sf)	200 m	23.92
2013	Universiade	Kazan, Russia	10th (sf)	200 m	23.68
2016	European Championships	Amsterdam, Netherlands	12th (h)	4 × 100 m relay	44.29
2017	Universiade	Taipei, Taiwan	12th (sf)	100 m	11.81

== Personal bests ==
Outdoor

- 100 metres – 11.63 (+1.0 m/s, Novi Sad 2009)
- 200 metres – 23.30 (+1.3 m/s, Budapest 2010)

Indoor

- 60 metres – 7.48 (Belfast 2010)
- 200 metres – 23.86 (Sheffield 2010)
