= 2010 European Athletics Championships – Women's 4 × 100 metres relay =

Women's 4 × 100 metres relay at the European Athletics Championships

The women's 4 × 100 metres relay at the 2010 European Athletics Championships was held at the Estadi Olímpic Lluís Companys on 31 July and 1 August.

== Medalists ==
Gold	Olesya Povh, Nataliya Pohrebnyak, Mariya Ryemyen, Yelizaveta Bryzhina; Ukraine (UKR)
Silver	Myriam Soumaré, Véronique Mang, Lina Jacques-Sébastien, Christine Arron; France (FRA)
Bronze	Marika Popowicz, Daria Korczyńska, Marta Jeschke, Weronika Wedler; Poland (POL)

== Records ==
Standing records prior to the 2010 European Athletics Championships
World record	East Germany; Silke Gladisch, Sabine Rieger; Ingrid Auerswald, Marlies Göhr	41.37	Canberra, Australia	6 October 1985
European record	East Germany; Silke Gladisch, Sabine Rieger; Ingrid Auerswald, Marlies Göhr	41.37	Canberra, Australia	6 October 1985
Championship record	East Germany; Silke Möller, Katrin Krabbe; Kerstin Behrendt, Sabine Günther	41.68	Split, Yugoslavia	1 September 1990
World Leading	(United States) Texas A&M University; Jeneba Tarmoh, Porscha Lucas; Dominique Duncan, Gabrielle Mayo	42.49	Austin, United States	29 May 2010
European Leading	Russia; Evgeniya Polyakova, Aleksandra Fedoriva; Yulia Gushchina, Yuliya Chermoshanskaya	42.98	Bergen, Norway	19 June 2010
Broken records during the 2010 European Athletics Championships
World Leading	Ukraine; Olesya Povh, Nataliya Pohrebnyak; Mariya Ryemyen, Yelizaveta Bryzhina	42.29	Barcelona, Spain	1 August 2010
European Leading	Ukraine; Olesya Povh, Nataliya Pohrebnyak; Mariya Ryemyen, Yelizaveta Bryzhina	42.29	Barcelona, Spain	1 August 2010

== Schedule ==
Date	Time	Round
31 July 2010	10:45	Round 1
1 August 2010	19:50	Final

== Results ==
=== Round 1 ===
First 3 in each heat (Q) and 2 best performers (q) advance to the Final.

==== Heat 1 ====
Rank	Lane	Nation	Athletes	React	Time	Notes
1	4	Ukraine	Olesya Povh, Nataliya Pohrebnyak, Mariya Ryemyen, Olena Chebanu	0.163	43.24	Q
2	1	Belarus	Yulia Nestsiarenka, Katsiaryna Shumak, Alena Neumiarzhitskaya, Yuliya Balykina	0.183	43.69	Q
3	2	Spain	Ana Torrijos, Digna Luz Murillo, Estela García, Amparo María Cotán	0.180	43.88	Q
4	5	Ireland	Amy Foster, Claire Brady, Niamh Whelan, Ailis McSweeney	0.200	43.93	
5	3	Lithuania	Silva Pesackaite, Edita Kavaliauskiene, Sonata Tamosaityte, Lina Grincikaite	0.188	44.13	
6	9	Italy	Jessica Paoletta, Tiziana Grasso, Giulia Arcioni, Audrey Alloh	0.293	44.15	
7	6	Slovenia	Tina Murn, Sabina Veit, Kristina Žumer, Merlene Ottey	0.230	44.30	
8	7	Netherlands	Femke van der Meij, Loreanne Kuhurima, Anouk Hagen, Jamile Samuel	0.184	44.70	
-	8	Germany	Yasmin Kwadwo, Marion Wagner, Anne Möllinger, Verena Sailer	0.146	DQ	

==== Heat 2 ====
Rank	Lane	Nation	Athletes	React	Time	Notes
DQ	2	Russia	Yuna Mekhti-Zade, Yuliya Katsura, Yulia Gushchina, Yuliya Chermoshanskaya	0.177	~~43.23~~	Q, Doping
1	4	Poland	Marika Popowicz, Daria Korczyńska, Marta Jeschke, Weronika Wedler	0.163	43.30	Q
2	8	France	Céline Distel, Véronique Mang, Nelly Banco, Christine Arron	0.200	43.35	Q
3	3	Belgium	Olivia Borlée, Hanna Mariën, Elodie Ouédraogo, Frauke Penen	0.194	43.82	q
4	9	Sweden	Emma Rienas, Lena Berntsson, Elina Backman, Moa Hjelmer	0.177	43.90	q
5	7	Great Britain & N.I.	Joice Maduaka, Montell Douglas, Hayley Jones, Laura Turner	0.184	44.09	
6	5	Bulgaria	Inna Eftimova, Monika Gachevska, Gabriela Laleva, Ivet Lalova	0.194	44.72	
7	1	Latvia	Marlēna Reimane, Ieva Zunda, Sandra Kruma, Jekaterina Čekele	0.185	44.92	
8	6	Norway	Siri Eritsland, Mari Gilde Brubak, Ida Bakke Hansen, Ezinne Okparaebo	0.156	44.96	

==== Summary ====
Rank	Heat	Lane	Nation	Athletes	React	Time	Notes
DQ	2	2	Russia	Yuna Mekhti-Zade, Yuliya Katsura, Yulia Gushchina, Yuliya Chermoshanskaya	0.177	~~43.23~~	Q, Doping
1	1	4	Ukraine	Olesya Povh, Nataliya Pohrebnyak, Mariya Ryemyen, Olena Chebanu	0.163	43.24	Q
2	2	4	Poland	Marika Popowicz, Daria Korczyńska, Marta Jeschke, Weronika Wedler	0.163	43.30	Q
3	2	8	France	Céline Distel, Véronique Mang, Nelly Banco, Christine Arron	0.200	43.35	Q
4	1	1	Belarus	Yulia Nestsiarenka, Katsiaryna Shumak, Alena Neumiarzhitskaya, Yuliya Balykina	0.183	43.69	Q
5	2	3	Belgium	Olivia Borlée, Hanna Mariën, Elodie Ouédraogo, Frauke Penen	0.194	43.82	q
6	1	2	Spain	Ana Torrijos, Digna Luz Murillo, Estela García, Amparo María Cotán	0.180	43.88	Q
7	2	9	Sweden	Emma Rienas, Lena Berntsson, Elina Backman, Moa Hjelmer	0.177	43.90	q
8	1	5	Ireland	Amy Foster, Niamh Whelan, Claire Brady, Ailis McSweeney	0.200	43.93	NR
9	2	7	Great Britain & N.I.	Joice Maduaka, Montell Douglas, Hayley Jones, Laura Turner	0.184	44.09	
10	1	3	Lithuania	Silva Pesackaite, Edita Kavaliauskiene, Sonata Tamosaityte, Lina Grincikaite	0.188	44.13	
11	1	9	Italy	Jessica Paoletta, Tiziana Grasso, Giulia Arcioni, Audrey Alloh	0.293	44.15	
12	1	6	Slovenia	Tina Murn, Sabina Veit, Kristina Žumer, Merlene Ottey	0.230	44.30	
13	1	7	Netherlands	Femke van der Meij, Loreanne Kuhurima, Anouk Hagen, Jamile Samuel	0.184	44.70	
14	2	5	Bulgaria	Inna Eftimova, Monika Gachevska, Gabriela Laleva, Ivet Lalova	0.194	44.72	
15	2	1	Latvia	Marlēna Reimane, Ieva Zunda, Sandra Kruma, Jekaterina Cekele	0.185	44.92	
16	2	6	Norway	Siri Eritsland, Mari Gilde Brubak, Ida Bakke Hansen, Ezinne Okparaebo	0.156	44.96	
	1	8	Germany	Yasmin Kwadwo, Marion Wagner, Anne Möllinger, Verena Sailer	0.146	DQ	

=== Final ===
Rank	Lane	Nationality	Athlete	React	Time	Notes
1st place, gold medalist(s)	6	Ukraine	Olesya Povh, Nataliya Pohrebnyak, Mariya Ryemyen, Yelizaveta Bryzhina	0.156	42.29	WL, NR
2nd place, silver medalist(s)	7	France	Myriam Soumaré, Véronique Mang, Lina Jacques-Sébastien, Christine Arron	0.223	42.45	
3rd place, bronze medalist(s)	5	Poland	Marika Popowicz, Daria Korczyńska, Marta Jeschke, Weronika Wedler	0.221	42.68	NR
DQ	3	Russia	Yuna Mekhti-Zade, Aleksandra Fedoriva, Yulia Gushchina, Yuliya Chermoshanskaya	0.182	~~42.91~~	Doping
4	4	Belarus	Yulia Nestsiarenka, Katsiaryna Shumak, Alena Neumiarzhitskaya, Yuliya Balykina	0.234	43.18	
5	8	Spain	Ana Torrijos, Digna Luz Murillo, Estela García, Amparo María Cotán	0.207	43.45	NR
6	2	Sweden	Emma Rienas, Lena Berntsson, Elina Backman, Moa Hjelmer	0.170	43.75	
	1	Belgium	Olivia Borlée, Hanna Mariën, Elodie Ouédraogo, Frauke Penen	0.195	DNF	
