= 2011 European Athletics U23 Championships – Women's 200 metres =

The women's 200 metres at the 2011 European Athletics U23 Championships was held at the Městský stadion on 15 and 16 July.

== Medalists ==
Gold	Anna Kiełbasińska; Poland (POL)
Silver	Moa Hjelmer; Sweden (SWE)
Bronze	Marit Dopheide; Netherlands (NED)

Note: Darya Pizhankova of Ukraine originally won the gold medal but was later found guilty of doping offence and stripped of it.

== Schedule ==
Date	Time	Round
15 July 2011	18:25	Round 1
16 July 2011	11:15	Semifinals
16 July 2011	17:50	Final

== Results ==
=== Round 1 ===
Qualification: First 3 in each heat (Q) and 4 best performers (q) advance to the Semifinals.

Rank	Heat	Name	Nationality	React	Time	Notes
1	1	Moa Hjelmer	Sweden	0.167	23.62	Q, SB
2	2	Jacqueline Gasser	Switzerland	0.209	23.64	Q, PB
3	2	Andreea Ograzeanu	Romania	0.206	23.79	Q
4	2	Marina Panteleyeva	Russia	0.194	23.86	Q
4	3	Anna Kiełbasińska	Poland	0.198	23.86	Q
6	4	Anouk Hagen	Netherlands	0.162	23.87	Q
7	2	Kadene Vassel	Netherlands	0.205	23.95	q
8	4	Emily Diamond	Great Britain	0.186	23.96	Q
9	3	Marit Dopheide	Netherlands	0.154	24.02	Q
10	1	Martyna Opoń	Poland	0.194	24.08	Q
11	4	Émilie Gaydu	France	0.223	24.10	Q
12	4	Martina Amidei	Italy	0.149	24.11	q
13	2	Niamh Whelan	Ireland	0.149	24.13	q
14	1	Sarah Goujon	France	0.208	24.23	q
15	3	Estela García	Spain	0.214	24.26	Q
16	3	Liona Rebernik	Slovakia	0.183	24.39	
17	1	Ramona Papaioannou	Cyprus	0.179	24.41	
18	4	Alazne Furundarena	Spain	0.207	24.47	
19	3	Cornnelly Calydon	France	0.212	24.48	
20	2	Milena Pędziwiatr	Poland	0.217	24.57	
21	4	Jana Slaninová	Czech Republic	0.178	24.61	
22	1	Michaela D'Angelo	Italy	0.230	24.67	
23	2	Lenka Krsakova	Slovakia	0.181	24.69	
24	1	Silvestra Malinauskaitė	Lithuania	0.171	24.93	
25	3	Diane Borg	Malta	0.157	25.12	
	3	Ulyana Lepska	Ukraine	0.222	DQ	
	1	Darya Pizhankova	Ukraine	0.190	DQ	
	4	Folake Akinyemi	Norway		DNS	

=== Semifinals ===
Qualification: First 3 in each semifinal (Q) and 2 best performers (q) advance to the Final.

Rank	Heat	Name	Nationality	React	Time	
1	1	Moa Hjelmer	Sweden	0.181	23.20	Q, PB
2	1	Marit Dopheide	Netherlands	0.148	23.35	Q, PB
3	1	Anouk Hagen	Netherlands	0.155	23.39	Q, PB
4	2	Anna Kiełbasińska	Poland		23.40	Q
5	1	Andreea Ograzeanu	Romania	0.234	23.51	q
6	1	Martyna Opoń	Poland	0.204	23.62	q, PB
7	2	Kadene Vassel	Netherlands		23.70	Q
8	2	Jacqueline Gasser	Switzerland		23.81	
9	2	Émilie Gaydu	France		23.82	
10	1	Estela García	Spain	0.217	23.87	=PB
11	2	Niamh Whelan	Ireland		23.92	
12	2	Emily Diamond	Great Britain		23.98	
13	1	Sarah Goujon	France	0.230	24.05	=SB
14	1	Martina Amidei	Italy	0.202	24.15	
	2	Marina Panteleyeva	Russia		DNF	
	2	Darya Pizhankova	Ukraine		DQ	

=== Final ===
Rank	Name	Nationality	React	Time	Notes
1st place, gold medalist(s)	Anna Kiełbasińska	Poland	0.207	23.23	PB
2nd place, silver medalist(s)	Moa Hjelmer	Sweden	0.186	23.24	
3rd place, bronze medalist(s)	Marit Dopheide	Netherlands	0.151	23.32	PB
4	Kadene Vassel	Netherlands	0.185	23.61	PB
5	Anouk Hagen	Netherlands	0.177	23.62	
6	Andreea Ograzeanu	Romania	0.255	23.69	
7	Martyna Opoń	Poland	0.244	23.95	
	Darya Pizhankova	Ukraine	0.225	DQ	

== Participation ==
According to an unofficial count, 27 athletes from 18 countries participated in the event.

- Cyprus (1)
- Czech Republic (1)
- France (3)
- Ireland (1)
- Italy (2)
- Lithuania (1)
- Malta (1)
- Netherlands (3)
- Poland (3)
- Romania (1)
- Russia (1)
- Slovakia (1)
- Slovenia (1)
- Spain (2)
- Sweden (1)
- Switzerland (1)
- Ukraine (2)
- United Kingdom (1)
