= Estela García =

Spanish sprinter (born 1989)

Personal information
- Full name: Estela García Villalta
- Nationality: Spanish
- Born: 20 March 1989 (age 37) Vilanova i la Geltrú, Spain
- Height: 1.74 m (5 ft 9 in)
- Weight: 55 kg (121 lb)

Sport
- Country: Spain
- Sport: Athletics
- Event(s): 100 m, 200 m
Medal record
Women's Athletics
Representing Spain
Mediterranean Games
Silver medal – second place	Tarragona 2018	4x100 m
Bronze medal – third place	Tarragona 2018	200 m

Estela De Covadonga García Villalta (born 20 March 1989) is a Spanish sprinter. She competed in the 100 metres and 200 metres at the 2016 European Athletics Championships. García was suspended for 2 years in 2011 after testing positive for a diuretic.

== International competitions ==
Year	Competition	Venue	Position	Event	Notes
Representing Spain
2005	European Youth Olympic Festival	Lignano Sabbiadoro, Italy	17th (h)	200 m	25.62
2005	European Youth Olympic Festival	Lignano Sabbiadoro, Italy	8th (h)	4 × 100 m relay	48.30
2008	World Junior Championships	Bydgoszcz, Poland	32nd (h)	100 m	12.03
2008	World Junior Championships	Bydgoszcz, Poland	36th (h)	200 m	24.67
2008	World Junior Championships	Bydgoszcz, Poland	16th (h)	4 × 100 m relay	45.88
2009	Mediterranean Games	Pescara, Italy	8th	200 m	24.29
2009	European U23 Championships	Kaunas, Lithuania	15th (h)	200 m	24.08
2009	European U23 Championships	Kaunas, Lithuania	9th (h)	4 × 100 m relay	45.18
2010	Ibero-American Championships	San Fernando, Spain	9th (h)	200 m	24.51
2010	Ibero-American Championships	San Fernando, Spain	3rd	4 × 100 m relay	44.38
2010	European Championships	Barcelona, Spain	6th	4 × 100 m relay	43.45
2011	European U23 Championships	Ostrava, Czech Republic	20th (h)	100 m	12.03
2011	European U23 Championships	Ostrava, Czech Republic	10th (sf)	200 m	23.87
2013	Mediterranean Games	Mersin, Turkey	2nd	100 m	11.53
2013	Mediterranean Games	Mersin, Turkey	4th	200 m	23.65
2014	European Championships	Zürich, Switzerland	29th (h)	100 m	11.72
2014	European Championships	Zürich, Switzerland	14th (h)	4 × 100 m relay	44.68
2016	European Championships	Amsterdam, Netherlands	15th (h)	100 m	11.64
2016	European Championships	Amsterdam, Netherlands	17th (sf)	200 m	23.53
2016	European Championships	Amsterdam, Netherlands	10th (h)	4 × 100 m relay	44.14
2016	Olympic Games	Rio de Janeiro, Brazil	52nd (h)	200 m	23.43
2017	World Championships	London, United Kingdom	38th (q)	200 m	23.78
2018	Mediterranean Games	Tarragona, Spain	3rd	200 m	23.11
2018	Mediterranean Games	Tarragona, Spain	2nd	4 × 100 m relay	43.31
2018	European Championships	Berlin, Germany	19th (sf)	200 m	23.46
2018	European Championships	Berlin, Germany	8th	4 × 100 m relay	43.54
2019	European Indoor Championships	Glasgow, United Kingdom	24th (sf)	60 m	7.46
2021	World Relays	Chorzów, Poland	9th (h)	4 × 100 m relay	44.38

== Personal bests ==
Outdoor

- 100 metres – 11.30 (+1.4 m/s, Madrid 2018)
- 200 metres – 23.11 (+0.5 m/s, Tarragona 2018)
- 300 metres – 37.30 (Barcelona 2018)

Indoor

- 60 metres – 7.41 (Madrid 2016)
- 200 metres – 23.77 (Sabadell 2013)
