= Ivana Rožman =

Macedonian sprinter (born 1989)

Personal information
- Born: 14 July 1989 (age 36) Skopje, North Macedonia

Sport
- Country: North Macedonia
- Sport: Track and field
- Event: 100 metres

Ivana Rožman (born 14 July 1989 in Skopje) is a track and field sprint athlete who competes internationally for North Macedonia.

Rožman represented Macedonia at the 2008 Summer Olympics in Beijing. She competed at the 100 metres sprint and placed seventh in her heat without advancing to the second round. She ran the distance in a time of 12.92 seconds.

== Competition record ==
Year	Competition	Venue	Position	Event	Notes
Representing North Macedonia
2008	World Junior Championships	Bydgoszcz, Poland	60th (h)	100 m	12.96 (wind: -3.3 m/s)
2008	Olympic Games	Beijing, China	69th (h)	100 m	12.92
2009	European Indoor Championships	Turin, Italy	31st (h)	60 m	8.05
2009	Universiade	Belgrade, Serbia	28th (h)	100 m	12.20
2009	Universiade	Belgrade, Serbia	28th (h)	200 m	25.38
2009	European U23 Championships	Kaunas, Lithuania	29th (h)	100 m	12.49 (wind: -2.0 m/s)
2009	World Championships	Berlin, Germany	47th (h)	100 m	12.60
2010	European Championships	Barcelona, Spain	31st (h)	100 m	12.90
2011	European U23 Championships	Ostrava, Czech Republic	24th (h)	100 m	12.57 (wind: -0.6 m/s)
2011	World Championships	Daegu, South Korea	50th (h)	100 m	12.42
2012	European Championships	Helsinki, Finland	31st (h)	100 m	12.86
