= Ilenia Draisci =

Italian sprinter (born 1989)

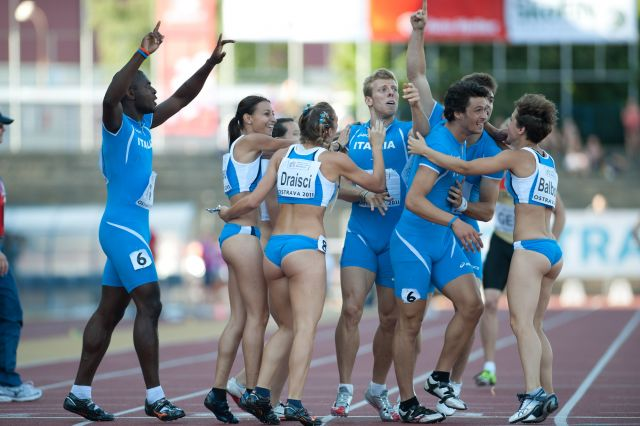
- Ilenia Draisci (shoulders) at the 2011 European U23 Championships held in Ostrava.

Personal information
- Nationality: Italian
- Born: 13 July 1989 (age 36) Rome, Italy
- Height: 1.63 m (5 ft 4 in)
- Weight: 55 kg (121 lb)

Sport
- Country: Italy
- Sport: Athletics
- Event: Sprint
- Club: G.S. Esercito
- Coached by: Maura Cosso

Achievements and titles
- Personal bests: 60 m 7.87 (2013); 100 m: 11.53 (2013)
Medal record
Mediterranean Games
Gold medal – first place	2013 Mersin	100 metres
Gold medal – first place	2013 Mersin	4 × 100 m relay

Ilenia Draisci (born 13 July 1989) is an Italian sprinter.

== Biography ==
Ilenia Draisci participated at one edition of the European Indoor Championships (2013), she has 3 caps in national team from 2012.

== Achievements ==
Year	Competition	Venue	Position	Event	Time	Notes
Representing Italy
2008	World Junior Championships	(Poland) Bydgoszcz	30th (h)	100m	12.02 (wind: -1.9 m/s)	
2008	World Junior Championships	(Poland) Bydgoszcz	14th (h)	4 × 100 m relay	45.64	
2009	European U23 Championships	(Lithuania) Kaunas	16th (sf)	100m	12.10 (wind: -0.5 m/s)	
2009	European U23 Championships	(Lithuania) Kaunas	7th	4 × 100 m relay	45.40	
2011	European U23 Championships	(Czech Republic) Ostrava	11th (sf)	100m	11.79 (wind: -0.7 m/s)	
2011	European U23 Championships	(Czech Republic) Ostrava	4th	4 × 100 m relay	44.41	
2012	European Championships	(Finland) Helsinki	Heat	4 × 100 metres relay	43.90	
2013	European Indoor Championships	(Sweden) Gothenburg	Heat	60 metres	7.41	
2013	European Team Championships	(United Kingdom) Gateshead	11th	100 metres	12.08	
2013	European Team Championships	(United Kingdom) Gateshead	7th	4 × 100 metres relay	44.35	
2013	Mediterranean Games	(Turkey) Mersin	1st	100 metres	11.53	
2013	Mediterranean Games	(Turkey) Mersin	1st	4 × 100 m relay	44.66	

== National titles ==
She has won six times the individual national championship.

- 1 win in 100 metres (2011)

== See also ==
- Italy national relay team
- Italian all-time lists – 4 × 100 metres relay
- Italy at the 2013 Mediterranean Games
