= Tameka Williams =

Saint Kitts and Nevis sprinter (born 1989)

Personal information
- Nationality: Saint Kitts and Nevis
- Born: 31 August 1989 (age 36) Basseterre
- Height: 165 cm (5 ft 5 in)
- Weight: 59 kg (130 lb)

Sport
- Sport: Running
- Event(s): 100 metres, 200 metres, Long Jump

Achievements and titles
- Personal best(s): 100m: 11.18; 200m: 22.45

Tameka Williams (born 31 August 1989) is a sprinter from St Kitts and Nevis. In 2012, she was banned from the Olympic Games for doping offenses. She was set to compete in the Women's 100m and the Women's 200m. Williams admitted to having injected "Blast Off Red", a performance-enhancing drug used on race animals. She has denied taking any illegal substances, what she injected was not listed under the World Anti-Doping Agency banned substances; however the material falls by being under the category of veterinary medicine on the prohibited list.

== Achievements ==
Year	Competition	Venue	Position	Event	Notes
Representing Saint Kitts and Nevis
2006	World Junior Championships	Beijing, China	37th (h)	100m	12.00 (wind: +1.6 m/s)
2008	World Junior Championships	Bydgoszcz, Poland	23rd (sf)	100m	11.99 (wind: 0.0 m/s)
2008	World Junior Championships	Bydgoszcz, Poland	30th (h)	200m	24.55 (wind: +0.2 m/s)
2008	World Junior Championships	Bydgoszcz, Poland	6th	4 × 100 m relay	45.10
2009	Central American and Caribbean Championships	Havana, Cuba	1st	4 × 100 m relay	43.53 NR
2010	NACAC U23 Championships	Miramar, Florida, United States	8th	100m	12.78 (wind: +2.2 m/s) w
