= Anouk Hagen =

Dutch sprinter (born 1990)

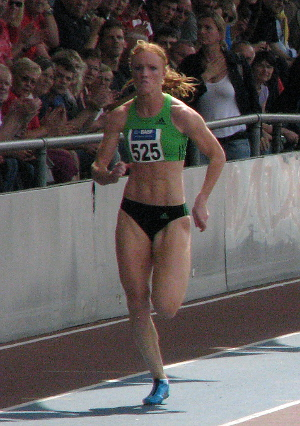
Anouk Hagen

Anouk Hagen (Dutch: [aːˈnuk ˈɦaːɣə(n)]; born 30 April 1990) is a Dutch retired sprinter.

She finished 5th in the 200 metres at the 2011 European U23 Championships. She also competed individually at the 2007 European Youth Olympic Festival, 2011 European U23 Championships (100 metres) without reaching the final.

In the 4 × 100 metres relay she won a bronze medal at the 2009 European Junior Championships and finished fifth at the 2011 European U23 Championships. She also competed at the 2010 European Championships and the 2011 World Championships without reaching the final. The Dutch team also won the 1st League at the 2010 and 2011 European Team Championships.

Her personal best times were 7.44 seconds in the 60 metres (indoors), achieved in February 2012 in Ghent; 11.70 seconds in the 100 metres, achieved in July 2011 in Rhede; and 23.39 seconds in the 200 metres, achieved in July 2011 in Ostrava.
