= Moa Hjelmer =

Swedish sprinter (born 1990)

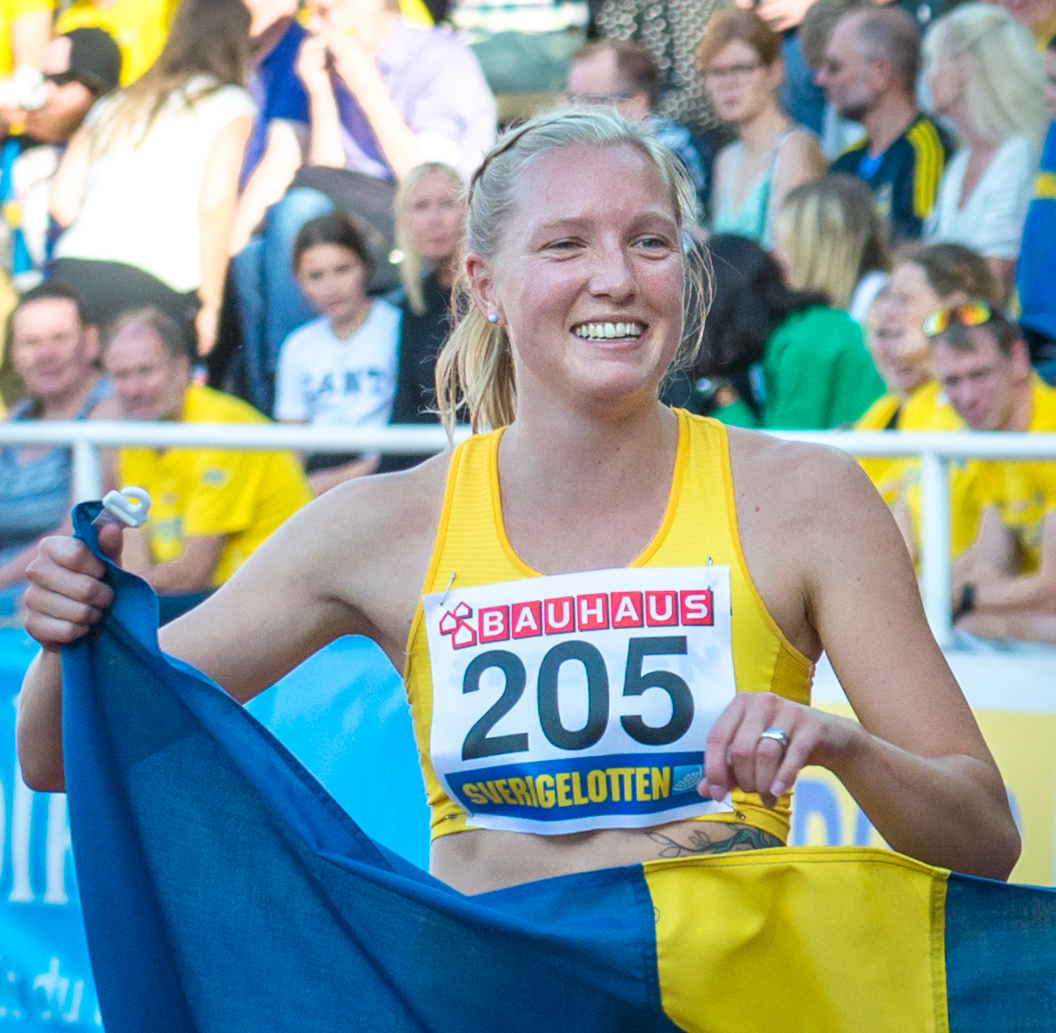
- Moa Hjelmer during the Finland-Sweden athletics international at the Stockholm Stadium in August 2019.

Personal information
- Full name: Moa Elin Marianne Hjelmer
- Nationality: Swedish
- Born: 19 June 1990 (age 36) Stockholm
- Height: 1.72 m (5 ft 7 1/2 in)
- Weight: 60 kg (130 lb)

Sport
- Country: Sweden
- Sport: Athletics
- Club: Spårvägens FK

Achievements and titles
- Personal best: 51.13 (400 metres)
Medal record
Representing Sweden
Women's athletics
European Championships
Gold medal – first place	2012 Helsinki	400 metres
European Indoor Championships
Bronze medal – third place	2013 Gothenburg	400 metres

Moa Elin Marianne Hjelmer (born 19 June 1990) is a Swedish athlete who competes in the 200 metres and 400 metres. Hjelmer was born in Stockholm. She won a silver medal in the Junior European Championships in 2011 in Ostrava. She beat the Swedish record time on 400 metres on 14 August 2011, then beat it twice during the European Championship in Helsinki in 2012. On 29 June 2012 she won a gold medal at the 2012 European Athletics Championships in Helsinki when she won the 400 metres final on a new Swedish record time of 51.13 seconds. She had set the previous record time at the previous day's semi final race.

On 13 December 2013, Hjelmer revealed that she was pregnant and would not compete during 2014.

== Competition record ==
Year	Competition	Venue	Position	Event	Notes
Representing Sweden
2008	World Junior Championships	Bydgoszcz, Poland	11th (sf)	400m	54.12
2009	European Junior Championships	Novi Sad, Serbia	3rd	400 m	54.01
2010	European Championships	Barcelona, Spain	7th	4 × 100 m relay	43.75
2011	European U23 Championships	Ostrava, Czech Republic	2nd	200 m	23.24
2011	World Championships	Daegu, South Korea	24th (h)	200 m	23.31
2011	World Championships	Daegu, South Korea	18th (sf)	400 m	52.35
2012	World Indoor Championships	Istanbul, Turkey	6th (sf)	400 m	52.29
2012	European Championships	Helsinki, Finland	1st	400 m	51.13 (NR)
2012	Olympic Games	London, Great Britain	30th (h)	400 m	52.86
2013	World Championships	Moscow, Russia	31st (h)	200 m	23.33
2013	World Championships	Moscow, Russia	24th (h)	400 m	52.39
2018	European Championships	Berlin, Germany	9th (h)	4 × 400 m relay	3:32.61
