= Marit Dopheide =

Dutch sprinter

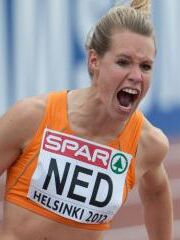
- Dopheide at the 2012 European Championships in Athletics, Helsinki

Personal information
- Nationality: Dutch
- Born: 28 December 1990 (age 35)

Sport
- Sport: Track and field
- Event: 400 metres
Medal record
Women's athletics
Representing Netherlands
European Championships
Silver medal – second place	2012 Helsinki	4 × 100 m relay
European Indoor Championships
Gold medal – first place	2021 Toruń	4 × 400 m relay
European U23 Championships
Bronze medal – third place	2011 Ostrava	200 m

Marit Dopheide (Dutch: [ˈmaːrɪ(d) ˈdɔpɦɛidə]) born 28 December 1990) is a Dutch athlete. She competed in the women's 4 × 400 metres relay event at the 2021 European Athletics Indoor Championships, winning the gold medal.
