= Nina Morozova =

Russian hurdler

Nina Morozova (Cyrillic: Нина Морозова; née Argunova; born 15 September 1989) is a Russian athlete specialising in the sprint hurdles. She won a silver medal at the 2015 Summer Universiade.

She has personal bests of 12.82 seconds in the 100 metres hurdles (-1.5 m/s, Adler 2015) and 8.05 seconds in the 60 metres hurdles (Prague 2015).

She studied at the Russian State University of Physical Education, Sport, Youth and Tourism.

== International competitions ==
Representing Russia
Year	Competition	Venue	Position	Event	Notes
2011	European U23 Championships	Ostrava, Czech Republic	5th	100 m hurdles	13.26
2011	European U23 Championships	Ostrava, Czech Republic	1st	4 × 100 m relay	44.14
2011	Universiade	Shenzhen, China	8th (sf)	200 m	23.71
2013	Universiade	Kazan, Russia	5th	100 m hurdles	13.06
2015	European Indoor Championships	Prague, Czech Republic	11th (sf)	60 m hurdles	8.05
2015	Universiade	Gwangju, South Korea	2nd	100 m hurdles	12.83
2015	Universiade	Gwangju, South Korea	–	4 × 100 m relay	NF
2015	World Championships	Beijing, China	13th (sf)	100 m hurdles	12.91

== Personal bests ==
Outdoor

- 200 metres – 23.41 (-0.5 m/s) (Sochi 2011)
- 100 metres hurdles – 12.82 (-1.5 m/s) (Adler 2015)

Indoor

- 200 metres – 23.88 (Moscow 2013)
- 60 metres hurdles – 8.05 (Prague 2015)
