= Folake Akinyemi =

Nigerian-Norwegian sprinter

Folake Akinyemi (born 31 March 1990) is a retired Nigerian-Norwegian sprinter who specialized in the 100 and 200 metres.

She was born in Lagos. A promising junior, she finished fourth in the 100 metres at the 2007 European Youth Olympic Festival, and at the 2009 European Junior Championships she won the silver medal in the 100 metres and finished sixth in the 200 metres. She also competed at the 2006 World Junior Championships (relay only), the 2007 European Junior Championships (100 only) the 2008 World Junior Championships (100 and 200 metres) and the 2011 European U23 Championships (100 and 200 metres) without reaching the final.

In senior events she competed at the 2009 European Indoor Championships, the 2010 World Indoor Championships, the 2010 European Championships, the 2012 European Championships and the 2013 European Indoor Championships without reaching the final. In her last international outing she reached the semi-final of the 100 metres at the 2013 Summer Universiade. She since retired because of injuries.

Her personal best times were 7.36 seconds in the 60 metres (indoor), achieved in February 2009 in Florø; 11.46 seconds in the 100 metres, achieved in June 2012 in Florø; and 23.61 seconds in the 200 metres, achieved in July 2010 in Donnas, Italy. She represented the clubs IL i BUL and SK Vidar before joining IK Tjalve ahead of the 2014 season, a season when she did not record any result.
