= Yuliya Baraley =

Ukrainian sprinter (born 1990)

Medal record
Men's athletics
Representing Ukraine
European Team Championships
Bronze medal – third place	2011 Stockholm	4x400 m relay
World Youth Championships
Gold medal – first place	2007 Ostrava	400 m
World Junior Championships
Silver medal – second place	2008 Bydgoszcz	4x400 m relay
European Junior Championships
Gold medal – first place	2009 Novi Sad	400 m

Yuliya Baraley (born 25 April 1990) is a Ukrainian retired sprinter who specialized in the 400 metres.

She won the gold medal at the 2007 World Youth Championships, finished fifth at the 2008 World Junior Championships, and won two gold medals at the 2009 European Junior Championships. She also competed in the 4 x 400 metres relay at the 2009 World Championships.

Her personal best time is 52.40 seconds, achieved in June 2008 in Yalta.
