= Anna Kiełbasińska =

Polish athlete (born 1990)

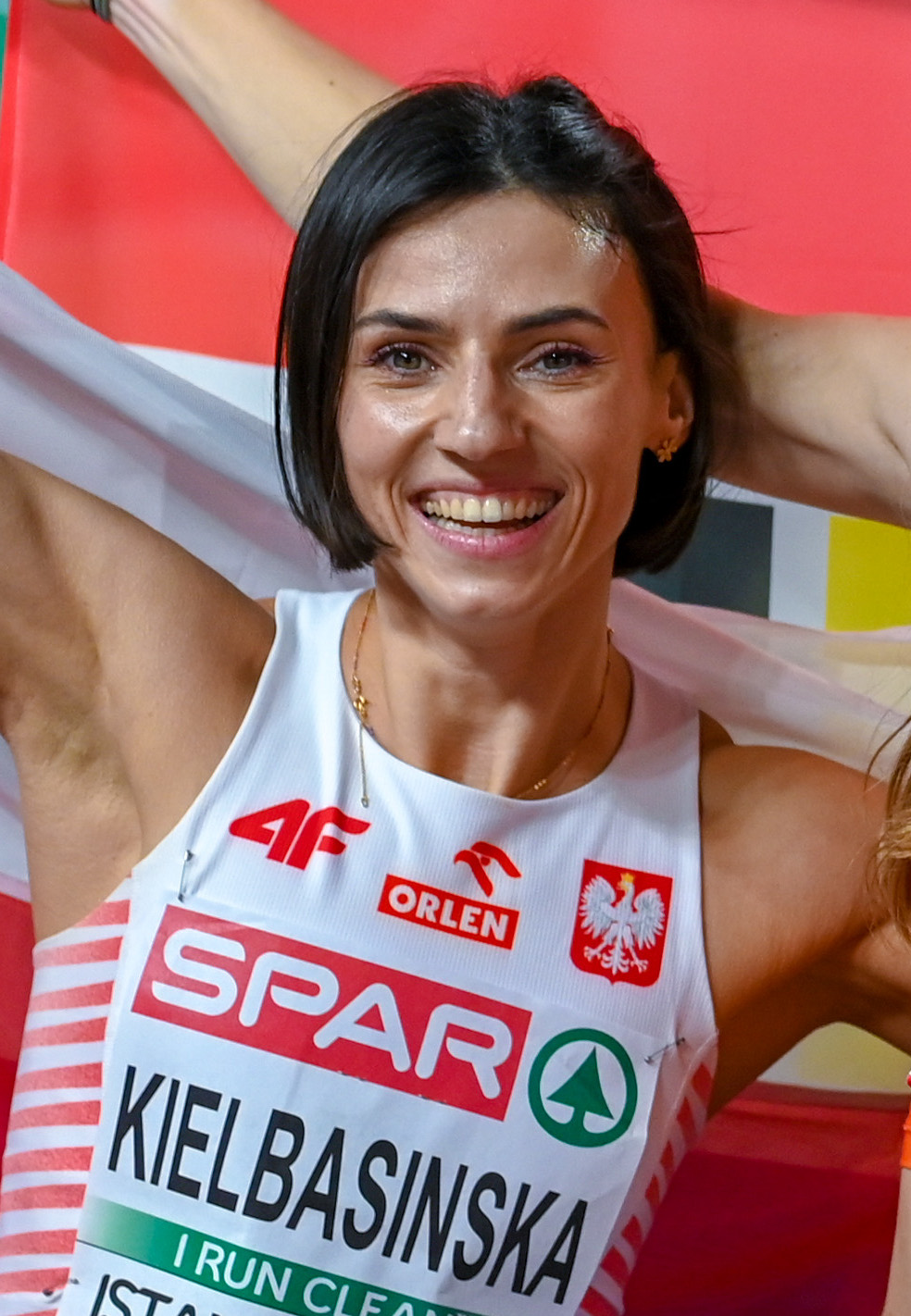
- Kiełbasińska at the 2023 European Indoor Championships in Istanbul

Personal information
- Born: 26 June 1990 (age 36) Warsaw, Poland
- Height: 1.70 m (5 ft 7 in)
- Weight: 55 kg (121 lb)

Sport
- Country: Poland
- Sport: Athletics
- Event: Sprinting
- Club: SKLA Sopot (2016–); AZS-AWF Warsaw(2009–2015); Polonia Warsaw (2005–2008)
- Coached by: Jarosław Skrzyszowski (Laurent Meuwly)
- Retired: 2024

Achievements and titles
- Personal bests: 400 m: 50.28 (2022); Indoors; 400 m: 51.10 (2022)
Medal record
Women's athletics
Representing Poland
Olympic Games
Silver medal – second place	2020 Tokyo	4 × 400 m relay
World Championships
Silver medal – second place	2019 Doha	4 × 400 m relay
European Games
Silver medal – second place	2023 Kraków-Małopolska	4 × 400 m mixed
European Championships
Silver medal – second place	2022 Munich	4 × 100 m relay
Silver medal – second place	2022 Munich	4 × 400 m relay
Bronze medal – third place	2022 Munich	400 m
European Indoor Championships
Gold medal – first place	2019 Glasgow	4 × 400 m relay
Bronze medal – third place	2023 Istanbul	400 m
Bronze medal – third place	2023 Istanbul	4 × 400 m relay
World Relay Championships
Gold medal – first place	2019 Yokohama	4 × 400 m relay
European Team Championships
Gold medal – first place	2019 Bydgoszcz	4 × 400 m relay
European U23 Championships
Gold medal – first place	2011 Ostrava	200 m
Bronze medal – third place	2011 Ostrava	100 m
European U20 Championships
Silver medal – second place	2009 Novi Sad	4 × 100 m relay
Bronze medal – third place	2009 Novi Sad	200 m
Military World Games
Gold medal – first place	2019 Wuhan	4 × 400 m relay
Silver medal – second place	2015 Mungyeong	200 m
Bronze medal – third place	2019 Wuhan	200 m

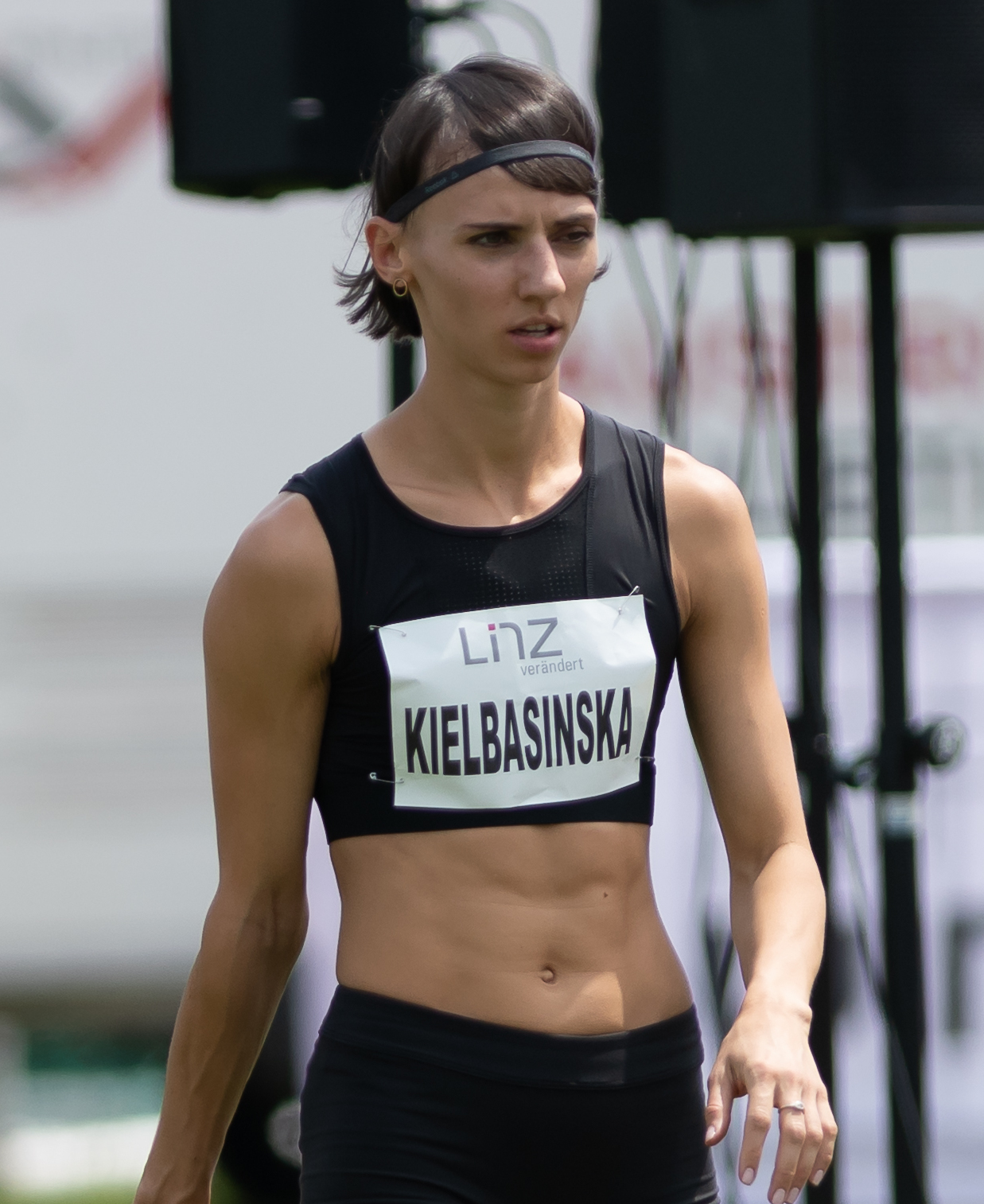
Kiełbasińska at the Leichtathletik Gala in Linz, Austria in 2018

Anna Kiełbasińska (pronounced [ˈanna kʲɛwbaˈɕij̃ska]; born 26 June 1990) is a retired Polish sprinter who competed first primarily in the 100 and 200 metres before moving up to 400 metres later in her career. She won the bronze medal in the 400 metres as well as silver medals in the 4 × 100 m and 4 × 400 m relays at the 2022 European Championships. Kiełbasińska earned bronze for the 400 m at the 2023 European Indoor Championships. She won several major medals as part of Polish 4 × 400 m relay teams and also individual medals at European Under-20 and U23 Championships.

Kiełbasińska represented Poland at the Summer Olympics in 2012, 2016 and 2020, and at the World Athletics Championships in 2011, 2015, 2017, 2019 and 2022. She won more than 10 individual Polish national titles.

== Career ==
Anna Kiełbasińska won the gold medal for the women's 4 × 400 metres relay at the 2019 European Indoor Championships in Glasgow, alongside Iga Baumgart-Witan, Małgorzata Hołub-Kowalik, and Justyna Święty-Ersetic.

At 2019 World Athletics Championships held in Doha, she won the silver medal for the women's 4 × 400 m relay, running in the heats. The team consisted of Hołub-Kowalik, Patrycja Wyciszkiewicz, Święty-Ersetic, and Baumgart-Witan.

Just five months before the postponed 2020 Tokyo Olympics in 2021, she underwent surgery to fix a broken navicular bone in her ankle. The third-grade fracture was fixed with two screws. Despite this, at the Games she helped Poland to victory in the heats of the women's 4 × 400 m relay, earning the silver medal alongside Baumgart-Witan, Hołub-Kowalik, Święty-Ersetic, and Natalia Kaczmarek.

In February 2022, Kiełbasińska set a new Polish indoor record in the 400 metres in a time of 51.10 seconds at a meeting in Ostrava, Czech Republic.

She was based in Poland, but later in her career would often join Dutch athletes, under the guidance of coach Laurent Meuwly, on training camps about four times a year.

Kiełbasińska has alopecia areata, an auto-immune disease.

== Statistics ==
=== International competitions ===
Representing Poland
Year	Competition	Venue	Position	Event	Notes
2007	European Junior Championships	Hengelo, Netherlands	5th	4 × 400 m relay	3:39.26
2008	World Junior Championships	Bydgoszcz, Poland	7th	200 m	23.95
2008	World Junior Championships	Bydgoszcz, Poland	6th (h)	4 × 100 m relay	44.73
2009	European Junior Championships	Novi Sad, Serbia	3rd	200 m	23.75
2009	European Junior Championships	Novi Sad, Serbia	2nd	4 × 100 m relay	45.12
2011	European U23 Championships	Ostrava, Czech Republic	3rd	100 m	11.77
2011	European U23 Championships	Ostrava, Czech Republic	1st	200 m	23.23
2011	European U23 Championships	Ostrava, Czech Republic	7th	4 × 100 m relay	44.67
2011	World Championships	Daegu, South Korea	25th (h)	200 m	23.34
2011	World Championships	Daegu, South Korea	–	4 × 100 m relay	DNF
2012	Olympic Games	London, United Kingdom	31st (h)	200 m	23.67
2014	World Indoor Championships	Sopot, Poland	17th (sf)	60 m i	7.31
2015	World Championships	Beijing, China	21st (sf)	200 m	23.07
2015	World Championships	Beijing, China	11th (h)	4 × 100 m relay	43.20
2015	Military World Games	Mungyeong, South Korea	2nd	200 m	23.33
2016	European Championships	Amsterdam, Netherlands	14th (sf)	200 m	23.36
2016	European Championships	Amsterdam, Netherlands	7th	4 × 100 m relay	43.24
2016	Olympic Games	Rio de Janeiro, Brazil	25th (h)	200 m	22.95
2016	Olympic Games	Rio de Janeiro, Brazil	12th (h)	4 × 100 m relay	43.33
2017	World Championships	London, United Kingdom	25th (h)	200 m	23.48
2017	DécaNation	Angers, France	2nd	100 m	11.46
2017	DécaNation	Angers, France	2nd	200 m	23.68
2018	World Indoor Championships	Birmingham, United Kingdom	15th (sf)	60 m i	7.23
2018	European Championships	Berlin, Germany	14th (sf)	200 m	23.29
2018	European Championships	Berlin, Germany	6th	4 × 100 m relay	43.34
2019	European Indoor Championships	Glasgow, United Kingdom	1st	4 × 400 m relay i	3:28.77
2019	World Relays	Yokohama, Japan	1st	4 × 400 m relay	3:27.49
2019	World Championships	Doha, Qatar	34th (h)	400 m	52.25
2019	World Championships	Doha, Qatar	2nd	4 × 400 m relay	3:25.78^{1}
2019	Military World Games	Wuhan, China	3rd	200 m	23.33
2019	Military World Games	Wuhan, China	1st	4 × 400 m relay	3:27.84
2021	Olympic Games	Tokyo, Japan	2nd	4 × 400 m relay	3:23.10^{1}
2022	World Championships	Eugene, OR, United States	8th	400 m	50.81
2022	European Championships	Munich, Germany	3rd	400 m	50.29
2022	European Championships	Munich, Germany	2nd	4 × 100 m relay	42.61 NR
2022	European Championships	Munich, Germany	2nd	4 × 400 m relay	3:21.68 SB
2023	European Indoor Championships	Istanbul, Turkey	3rd	400 m i	51.25 SB
2023	European Indoor Championships	Istanbul, Turkey	3rd	4 × 400 m relay i	3:29.31

^{1}Time from the heats; Kiełbasińska was replaced in the final.

=== Personal bests ===
- 60 metres indoor – 7.21 (Toruń 2021)

- 100 metres – 11.22 (-0.4 m/s) (Chorzów 2022)
- 200 metres – 22.76 (+1.9 m/s) (La Chaux-de-Fonds 2021)
  - 200 metres indoor – 23.02 (Toruń 2023)
- 400 metres – 50.28 (Paris 2022)
  - 400 metres indoor – 51.10 (Ostrava 2022)

=== National titles ===
- Polish Athletics Championships
  - 100 metres: 2014
  - 200 metres: 2015, 2016, 2017
  - 4 × 100 m relay: 2016
  - 4 × 400 m relay: 2013, 2014
- Polish Indoor Athletics Championships
  - 200 metres: 2011, 2012, 2014, 2015, 2016, 2017, 2018
  - 400 metres: 2009
