= Athletics at the 2015 Summer Universiade – Women's 100 metres hurdles =

The women's 100 metres hurdles event at the 2015 Summer Universiade was held on 9 and 10 July at the Gwangju Universiade Main Stadium.

== Medalists ==
Gold	Silver	Bronze
Danielle Williams; Jamaica	Nina Morozova; Russia	Michelle Jenneke; Australia

== Results ==
=== Heats ===
Qualification: First 2 in each heat (Q) and next 2 fastest (q) qualified for the final.

Wind:
Heat 1: -1.3 m/s, Heat 2: -0.8 m/s, Heat 3: -2.8 m/s

Rank	Heat	Name	Nationality	Time	Notes
1	1	Danielle Williams	Jamaica	13.08	Q
2	2	Eva Strogies	Germany	13.16	Q
3	3	Nina Morozova	Russia	13.24	Q
4	2	Michelle Jenneke	Australia	13.29	Q
5	3	Jade Barber	United States	13.30	Q
6	1	Matilda Bogdanoff	Finland	13.48	Q
7	1	Abbie Taddeo	Australia	13.52	q
8	1	Ivana Lončarek	Croatia	13.56	q
9	2	Rochelle Coster	New Zealand	13.69	
10	3	Sonata Tamošaitytė	Lithuania	13.78	
11	3	Fiona Morrison	New Zealand	13.78	
12	3	Karelle Edwards	Canada	13.87	
13	2	Michelle Young	Canada	13.95	
14	2	Alexia Fortenberry	United States	13.96	
15	1	Tale Oerving	Norway	14.05	
16	2	Kart Viltrop	Estonia	14.20	
17	3	Gréta Kerekes	Hungary	14.23	
18	1	Diana Suumann	Estonia	14.29	
19	1	Lui Lai Yiu	Hong Kong	14.29	
20	2	María Ignacia Eguiguren	Chile	14.41	
21	3	Simona Kapl	Slovenia	14.56	
22	1	Kateřina Cachová	Czech Republic	14.74	
23	3	Amina Zitouni	Algeria	14.97	
24	2	Christel El Saneh	Lebanon	15.70	

=== Final ===
Wind: +0.1 m/s

Official Video

Rank	Lane	Name	Nationality	Time	Notes
1st place, gold medalist(s)	4	Danielle Williams	Jamaica	12.78	
2nd place, silver medalist(s)	5	Nina Morozova	Russia	12.83	
3rd place, bronze medalist(s)	6	Michelle Jenneke	Australia	12.94	
4	7	Jade Barber	United States	13.03	
5	3	Eva Strogies	Germany	13.20	
6	8	Matilda Bogdanoff	Finland	13.35	SB
7	2	Ivana Lončarek	Croatia	13.37	
8	1	Abbie Taddeo	Australia	13.42	
