= Meritzer Williams =

Saint Kitts and Nevis sprinter (born 1989)

Personal information
- Born: 1 January 1989 (age 37) Charlestown, Saint Kitts and Nevis
Medal record
Athletics
Representing Saint Kitts and Nevis
World Junior Championships
Silver medal – second place	2008 Bydgoszcz	200 m
CARIFTA Games Junior (U20)
Silver medal – second place	2008 Basseterre	100 m
Silver medal – second place	2008 Basseterre	200 m

Meritzer Williams (born 1 January 1989) is a Saint Kitts and Nevis sprinter who specializes in the 200 metres. She was born in Charlestown.

Her personal best times are 11.57 seconds in the 100 metres, achieved in May 2008 in Provo; and 22.96 seconds in the 200 metres, achieved in June 2008 in Basseterre.

== Achievements ==
Year	Competition	Venue	Position	Event	Notes
Representing Saint Kitts and Nevis
2006	CARIFTA Games (U-20)	Les Abymes, Guadeloupe	5th (h)	200 m	25.86 (0.5 m/s)
2006	CARIFTA Games (U-20)	Les Abymes, Guadeloupe	5th	4 × 100 m relay	48.06
2007	CARIFTA Games (U-20)	Providenciales, Turks and Caicos Islands	5th (h)	100 m	12.02 (1.0 m/s)
2008	CARIFTA Games (U-20)	Basseterre, Saint Kitts and Nevis	2nd	100 m	11.41 w (2.5 m/s)
2008	CARIFTA Games (U-20)	Basseterre, Saint Kitts and Nevis	2nd	200 m	23.11 (1.4 m/s)
2008	CARIFTA Games (U-20)	Basseterre, Saint Kitts and Nevis	4th	4 × 100 m relay	45.99
2008	World Junior Championships	Bydgoszcz, Poland	7th	100 m	11.82 (−0.6 m/s)
2008	World Junior Championships	Bydgoszcz, Poland	2nd	200 m	23.40 (−0.9 m/s)
2008	World Junior Championships	Bydgoszcz, Poland	6th	4 × 100 m relay	45.10
2009	Central American and Caribbean Championships	Havana, Cuba	1st	4 × 100 m relay	43.53 NR
