= Athletics at the 2013 Summer Universiade – Women's 100 metres hurdles =

The women's 100 metres hurdles event at the 2013 Summer Universiade was held on 10 July.

== Medalists ==
Gold	Silver	Bronze
Vashti Thomas; United States	Alina Talay; Belarus	Danielle Williams; Jamaica

== Results ==
=== Heats ===
Qualification: First 2 in each heat (Q) and the next 2 best performers (q) qualified for the final.

Wind:
Heat 1: +0.5 m/s, Heat 2: +1.5 m/s, Heat 3: +2.1 m/s

Rank	Heat	Name	Nationality	Time	Notes
1	2	Vashti Thomas	United States	12.87	Q
2	1	Alina Talay	Belarus	12.94	Q, SB
3	1	Nina Argunova	Russia	13.06	Q, SB
4	2	Anna Plotitsyna	Ukraine	13.10	Q
4	3	Danielle Williams	Jamaica	13.10	Q
6	2	Shannon McCann	Australia	13.38	q
7	1	Sonata Tamošaitytė	Lithuania	13.41	q, SB
8	1	Natalya Ivoninskaya	Kazakhstan	13.42	
9	1	Jade Barber	United States	13.46	
9	3	Sade Mariah Greenidge	Barbados	13.46	Q
9	3	Tale Oerving	Norway	13.46	
12	1	Brianna Beahan	Australia	13.47	PB
13	3	Fiona Morrison	New Zealand	13.48	
14	2	Svetlana Topilina	Russia	13.50	
15	3	Sun Minjing	China	13.67	
16	2	Ellen Sprunger	Switzerland	13.70	SB
17	3	Hsieh Ching-ju	Chinese Taipei	13.85	
18	1	Raja Azhar	Malaysia	13.98	=SB
19	2	Bazhena Mosseyeva	Kazakhstan	14.24	
20	2	Arachchilage Galketiya	Sri Lanka	15.22	
	2	Elisa Leinonen	Finland	DNF	
	1	Lusiana Satriani	Indonesia	DNS	
	3	Ugonna Ndu	Nigeria	DNS	

=== Final ===
Wind: +1.8 m/s

Official Video

Rank	Lane	Name	Nationality	Time	Notes
1st place, gold medalist(s)	3	Vashti Thomas	United States	12.61	UR
2nd place, silver medalist(s)	6	Alina Talay	Belarus	12.78	SB
3rd place, bronze medalist(s)	5	Danielle Williams	Jamaica	12.84	
4	8	Anna Plotitsyna	Ukraine	13.04	
5	4	Nina Argunova	Russia	13.06	=SB
6	1	Shannon McCann	Australia	13.30	PB
7	7	Sade Mariah Greenidge	Barbados	13.35	
8	2	Sonata Tamošaitytė	Lithuania	13.35	SB
