= Track and field at the 2015 Military World Games – Women's 200 metres =

The women's 200 metres event at the 2015 Military World Games was held on 7 and 8 October at the KAFAC Sports Complex.

== Records ==
Prior to this competition, the existing world and CISM record were as follows:

World Record	Florence Griffith Joyner (USA)	21.34	Seoul, South Korea	29 September 1988
CISM World Record	Ana Cláudia Silva (BRA)	23.01	Rio de Janeiro, Brazil	23 July 2011

== Schedule ==
Date	Time	Round
7 October 2015	10:50	Round 1
8 October 2015	13:15	Final

== Medalists ==
Gold	Silver	Bronze
Edidiong Odiong; Bahrain	Anna Kiełbasińska; Poland	Rosângela Santos; Brazil

== Results ==
=== Round 1 ===
Qualification: First 2 in each heat (Q) and next 2 fastest (q) qualified for the final.

Wind:
Heat 1: -1.6 m/s, Heat 2: -1.0 m/s, Heat 3: -0.9 m/s

Rank	Heat	Name	Nationality	Time	Notes
1	3	Anna Kiełbasińska	Poland	23.50	Q
2	3	Edidiong Odiong	Bahrain	23.56	Q
3	2	Nataliya Pohrebnyak	Ukraine	23.90	Q
4	1	Vitória Cristina Rosa	Brazil	24.06	Q
5	2	Nadezhda Kotliarova	Russia	24.09	Q
6	2	Rosângela Santos	Brazil	24.09	q
7	3	Andriana Ferra	Greece	24.14	q
8	1	Kseniya Ryzhova	Russia	24.16	Q
9	1	Marta Jeschke	Poland	24.20	
10	2	Xuan Wang	China	24.30	
11	1	Yelyzaveta Bryzhina	Ukraine	24.42	
12	2	Sabina Mukoswa	Kenya	25.37	
13	3	Margarita Manzueta	Dominican Republic	25.48	
14	2	LaTisha Moulds	United States	26.32	
15	3	Rose Cherono Sang	Kenya	26.38	
16	2	Jelena Marsenic	Montenegro	32.91	
	1	Xuejing Yao	China	DQ	R163.3
	3	Alexina Haantebe	Zambia	DQ	R163.3

=== Final ===
Wind: +3.2 m/s

Rank	Lane	Name	Nationality	Time	Notes
1st place, gold medalist(s)	6	Edidiong Odiong	Bahrain	23.18	
2nd place, silver medalist(s)	5	Anna Kiełbasińska	Poland	23.33	
3rd place, bronze medalist(s)	1	Rosângela Santos	Brazil	23.38	
4	4	Nataliya Pohrebnyak	Ukraine	23.55	
5	2	Andriana Ferra	Greece	23.66	
6	8	Nadezhda Kotliarova	Russia	23.69	
7	3	Vitória Cristina Rosa	Brazil	23.81	
	7	Kseniya Ryzhova	Russia	DQ	R162.7
