= Andreea Ogrăzeanu =

Romanian sprinter

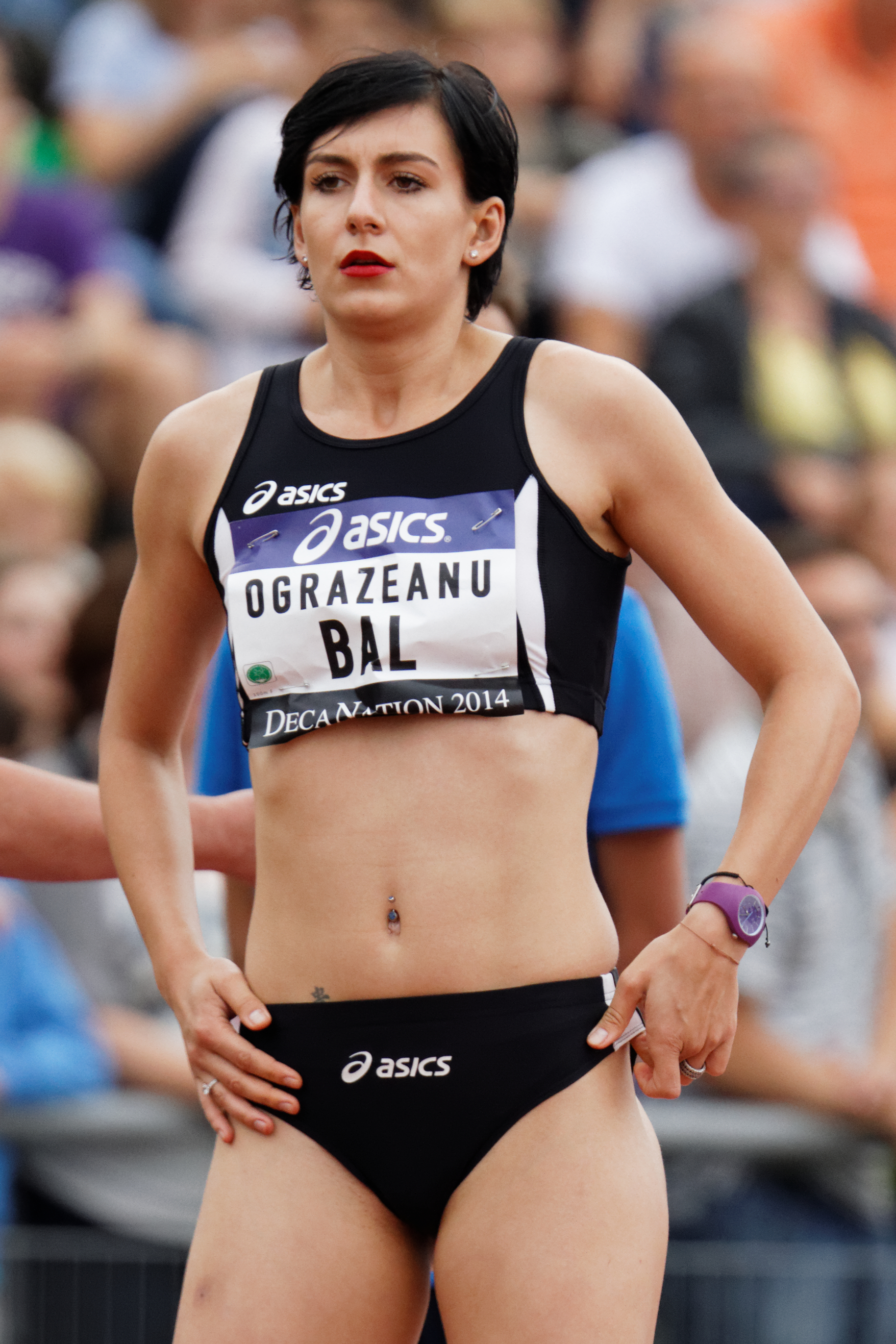
- Ogrăzeanu at the 2014 DécaNation

Personal information
- Born: 24 March 1990 (age 36) Alexandria, Romania
- Height: 1.79 m (5 ft 10 1/2 in)
- Weight: 62 kg (137 lb)

Sport
- Country: Romania
- Sport: Athletics
- College team: University of Craiova

Andreea Luiza Ogrăzeanu (born 24 March 1990) is a Romanian sprinter. At the 2012 Summer Olympics, she competed in the Women's 100 metres and the women's 200 metres.

She studied physical education at the University of Craiova.

== Competition record ==
Year	Competition	Venue	Position	Event	Notes
Representing Romania
2005	World Youth Championships	Marrakesh, Morocco	34th (h)	100 m	12.09
2005	World Youth Championships	Marrakesh, Morocco	37th (h)	200 m	25.16
2006	World Junior Championships	Beijing, China	38th (h)	100 m	12.00
2006	World Junior Championships	Beijing, China	42nd (h)	200 m	25.05
2007	World Youth Championships	Ostrava, Czech Republic	5th	100 m	11.80
2007	World Youth Championships	Ostrava, Czech Republic	15th (sf)	200 m	24.49
2007	European Junior Championships	Hengelo, Netherlands	15th (sf)	100 m	11.94
2008	World Junior Championships	Bydgoszcz, Poland	6th	100 m	11.67
2008	World Junior Championships	Bydgoszcz, Poland	14th (sf)	200 m	24.00
2008	World Junior Championships	Bydgoszcz, Poland	11th (h)	4 × 400 m relay	3:41.39
2009	European Junior Championships	Novi Sad, Serbia	3rd	100 m	11.47
2009	European Junior Championships	Novi Sad, Serbia	1st	200 m	23.70
2009	World Championships	Berlin, Germany	27th (h)	200 m	23.42
2009	Jeux de la Francophonie	Beirut, Lebanon	4th	100 m	11.74
2009	Jeux de la Francophonie	Beirut, Lebanon	6th (h)	200 m	24.21 (Note: Did not start in the final)
2010	European Championships	Barcelona, Spain	25th (h)	100 m	11.78
2010	European Championships	Barcelona, Spain	19th (h)	200 m	23.89
2011	European Indoor Championships	Paris, France	23rd (h)	60 m	7.50
2011	European U23 Championships	Ostrava, Czech Republic	1st	100 m	11.65
2011	European U23 Championships	Ostrava, Czech Republic	6th	200 m	23.69
2011	Universiade	Shenzhen, China	6th	100 m	11.49
2011	Universiade	Shenzhen, China	31st (qf)	200 m	25.62
2011	World Championships	Daegu, South Korea	32nd (h)	100 m	11.46
2012	European Championships	Helsinki, Finland	17th (h)	100 m	11.55
2012	European Championships	Helsinki, Finland	18th (sf)	200 m	23.66
2012	Olympic Games	London, United Kingdom	38th (h)	100 m	11.44
2012	Olympic Games	London, United Kingdom	37th (h)	200 m	23.46
2013	Universiade	Kazan, Russia	3rd	100 m	11.41
2013	Universiade	Kazan, Russia	3rd	200 m	23.10
2013	Jeux de la Francophonie	Nice, France	2nd	100 m	11.72
2013	Jeux de la Francophonie	Nice, France	4th	200 m	24.44
2014	European Championships	Zurich, Switzerland	13th (sf)	100 m	11.39
2014	European Championships	Zurich, Switzerland	20th (h)	200 m	23.64 (Note: Did not start in the semifinals)
2015	Universiade	Gwangju, South Korea	17th (sf)	100 m	11.79
2015	Universiade	Gwangju, South Korea	20th (h)	200 m	24.45 (Note: Did not finish in the semifinals)
2016	European Championships	Amsterdam, Netherlands	19th (h)	100 m	11.73
