= 2009 European Athletics Junior Championships =

- Dates: 23–26 July
- Host city: Novi Sad, Serbia
- Venue: Stadion Karađorđe
- Level: Under 20
- Events: 44
- Records set: 1 EJR, 7 CRs

The 20th European Athletics Junior Championships were held between 23 and 26 July 2009 in the Stadion Karađorđe in Novi Sad, Serbia.

Germany topped the medal table with 25 medals overall, including 10 golds, ahead of Russia and Ukraine.

== Medal summary ==
=== Men ===
Event	Gold		Silver		Bronze	
100 m	Christophe Lemaitre (FRA)	10.04 EJR	Ramil Guliyev (AZE)	10.16	Eugene Ayanful (GBR)	10.37 PB
200 m	Ramil Guliyev (AZE)	20.33 CR	Robert Hering (GER)	20.83	Diego Marani (ITA)	21.03
400 m	Chris Clarke (GBR)	45.59 PB	Andrzej Jaros (POL)	46.75 PB	Louis Persent (GBR)	46.82
800 m	Kevin López (ESP)	1:48.25	Niall Brooks (GBR)	1:49.21	Aleksandr Sheplyakov (RUS)	1:49.37 SB
1500 m	David Bustos (ESP)	3:53.31	Resul Çevik (TUR)	3:54.30	Simon Horsfield (GBR)	3:54.56
5000 m	Hayle Ibrahimov (AZE)	14:01.19 NR	Jakub Zivec (CZE)	14:10.58 PB	Aitor Fernández (ESP)	14:20.14 PB
10 000 m	Hayle Ibrahimov (AZE)	30:06.64 PB	Simon Lawson (GBR)	30:35.62	Siarhei Platonau (BLR)	30:55.92 PB
3000 m steeplechase	Antonio Abadía (ESP)	8:47.45 PB	James Wilkinson (GBR)	8:51.54 PB	Jeroen D'Hoedt (BEL)	8:51.76 PB
110 m hurdles	Lawrence Clarke (GBR)	13.37 NJR	Sergey Shubenkov (RUS)	13.40	Aliaksandr Linnik (BLR)	13.41 =NR
400 m hurdles	Tobias Giehl (GER)	50.85 PB	Marc John Dombrowski (GER)	51.28	Nikita Andriyanov (RUS)	51.43
10 000 m walk	Stanislav Yemelyanov (RUS)	40:20.86	Denis Strelkov (RUS)	40:24.97	Valeriy Filipchuk (RUS)	40:29.35
4 × 100 m relay	Roy Schmidt; Robert Hering; Florian Föstl; Felix Göltl; Germany (GER)	39.33	Martin Rícar; Lukás Stastný; Pavel Maslák; Václav Zich; Czech Republic (CZE)	39.57 NJR	Andrew Robertson; Junior Ejehu; Deji Tobias; Eugene Ayanful; Great Britain (GBR)	39.78
4 × 400 m relay	Louis Persent; Ross McDonald; Nathan Wake; Chris Clarke; Great Britain (GBR)	3:07.82	Niklas Zender; Benjamin Jonas; Sascha Eder; Marco Kaiser; Germany (GER)	3:08.11	Andrea Daminelli; Francesco Cappellin; Alessandro Pedrazzoli; Francesco Ravasio; Italy (ITA)	3:09.87
High jump	Sergey Mudrov (RUS)	2.25 PB	Ümit Tan (TUR)	2.25 NJR	Artsiom Naumovich (BLR)	2.19 PB
Pole vault	Nico Weiler (GER)	5.25	Dmitriy Zhelyabin (RUS)	5.25	Henri Väyrynen (FIN)	5.15 PB
Long jump	Aleksandr Menkov (RUS)	7.98	Łukasz Masłowski (POL)	7.85 PB	Denis Bogdanov (RUS)	7.76
Triple jump	Aleksey Fyodorov (RUS)	16.67	Aşkın Karaca (TUR)	16.10 NJR	Pavels Kovalovs (LAT)	16.03 PB
Shot put	David Storl (GER)	22.40 CR	Mykyta Nesterenko (UKR)	20.22	Hendrik Müller (GER)	19.63
Discus	Mykyta Nesterenko (UKR)	65.73 CR	Gordon Wolf (GER)	63.02	Marin Premeru (CRO)	60.98
Hammer	Andriy Martynyuk (UKR)	79.54 CR	Ákos Hudi (HUN)	79.14 PB	Javier Cienfuegos (ESP)	79.12 NR
Javelin	Andreas Hofmann (GER)	75.89	Till Wöschler (GER)	73.66	Łukasz Grzeszczuk (POL)	73.55 PB
Decathlon	Thomas Van der Plaetsen (BEL)	7769 NJR	Petter Olson (SWE)	7734 PB	Kai Kazmirek (GER)	7639 PB
WR world record | AR area record | CR championship record | GR games record | NR national record | OR Olympic record | PB personal best | SB season best | WL world leading (in a given season)

=== Women ===
Event	Gold		Silver		Bronze	
100 m	Yasmin Kwadwo (GER)	11.42	Folake Akinyemi (NOR)	11.47 PB	Andreea Ograzeanu (ROU)	11.47
200 m	Andreea Ograzeanu (ROU)	23.70	Alena Tamkova (RUS)	23.72	Anna Kiełbasińska (POL)	23.75
400 m	Yuliya Baraley (UKR)	52.89	Liliya Gafiyatullina (RUS)	53.51 PB	Moa Hjelmer (SWE)	54.01 PB
800 m	Elena Mirela Lavric (ROU)	2:04.12	Corinna Harrer (GER)	2:04.51	Yekaterina Zavyalova (RUS)	2:04.59
1500 m	Darya Yachmeneva (RUS)	4:14.64 PB	Layes Abdullayeva (AZE)	4:16.63 PB	Elina Sujew (GER)	4:16.86
3000 m	Yelena Korobkina (RUS)	9:13.35 PB	Kate Avery (GBR)	9:13.68 PB	Louise Small (GBR)	9:15.47 PB
5000 m	Karoline Bjerkeli Grøvdal (NOR)	15:45.45	Charlotte Purdue (GBR)	15:55.96	Veronica Inglese (ITA)	16:41.37 PB
3000 m steeplechase	Karoline Bjerkeli Grøvdal (NOR)	9:43.69 CR	Layes Abdullayeva (AZE)	9:55.95 NR	Louise Webb (GBR)	10:10.34 PB
100 m hurdles	Anne Zagré (BEL)	13.21	Isabelle Pedersen (NOR)	13.49	Yariatou Toure (FRA)	13.52
400 m hurdles	Inga Müller (GER)	57.16	Mila Andrić (SRB)	57.55 NR	Katsiatyna Artyukh (BLR)	58.09 =PB
10 000 m walk	Elmira Alembekova (RUS)	46:31.07	Antonella Palmisano (ITA)	46:59.47 SB	Nina Okhotnikova (RUS)	47:04.97
4 × 100 m relay	Yasmin Kwadwo; Leena Günther; Nadja Bahl; Ruth Sophia Spelmeyer; Germany (GER)	44.86	Ewelina Skoczylas; Małgorzata Kołdej; Ewa Zarębska; Anna Kiełbasińska; Poland (POL)	45.12	Judith Bosker; Yaël van Pelt; Anouk Hagen; Jamile Samuel; Netherlands (NED)	45.88
4 × 400 m relay	Olha Zemlyak; Yuliya Krasnoshchok; Alina Lohvynenko; Yuliya Baraley; Ukraine (UKR)	3:35.82 NJR	Yuliya Terekhova; Liliya Zubkova; Alina Safiullina; Liliya Gafiytullina; Russia (RUS)	3:36.25	Laura Hansen; Maral Feizbakhsh; Daniela Ferenz; Inga Müller; Germany (GER)	3:37.83
High jump	Natalya Mamlina (RUS)	1.91 PB	Marina Vuković (MNE)	1.89 NR	Burcu Ayhan (TUR)	1.89 =NJR
Pole vault	Martina Schultze (GER)	4.20	Yekaterina Kolesova (RUS)	4.10	Caroline Bonde Holm (DEN)	4.10
Long jump	Darya Klishina (RUS)	6.80 CR	Ivana Španović (SRB)	6.71 NR	Anna Jagaciak (POL)	6.29 =PB
Triple jump	Liane Pintsaar (EST)	13.89 PB	Cristina Sandu (ROU)	13.61 PB	Jenny Elbe (GER)	13.55
Shot put	Aliona Hryshko (BLR)	17.59	Samira Burkhardt (GER)	16.46	Sophie Kleeberg (GER)	15.95
Discus	Sandra Perković (CRO)	62.44 NR	Julia Schäfer (GER)	55.11	Irina Rodrigues (POR)	53.14
Hammer	Bianca Perie (ROU)	68.59 CR	Jenny Ozorai (HUN)	63.70	Sophie Hitchon (GBR)	63.18 NJR
Javelin	Tatjana Jelača (SRB)	60.35 NR	Karolina Mor (POL)	53.57	Sabine Kopplin (GER)	53.26 PB
Heptathlon	Carolin Schäfer (GER)	5697 SB	Kateřina Cachová (CZE)	5660 SB	Léa Sprunger (SUI)	5552 SB
WR world record | AR area record | CR championship record | GR games record | NR national record | OR Olympic record | PB personal best | SB season best | WL world leading (in a given season)

== Medal table ==
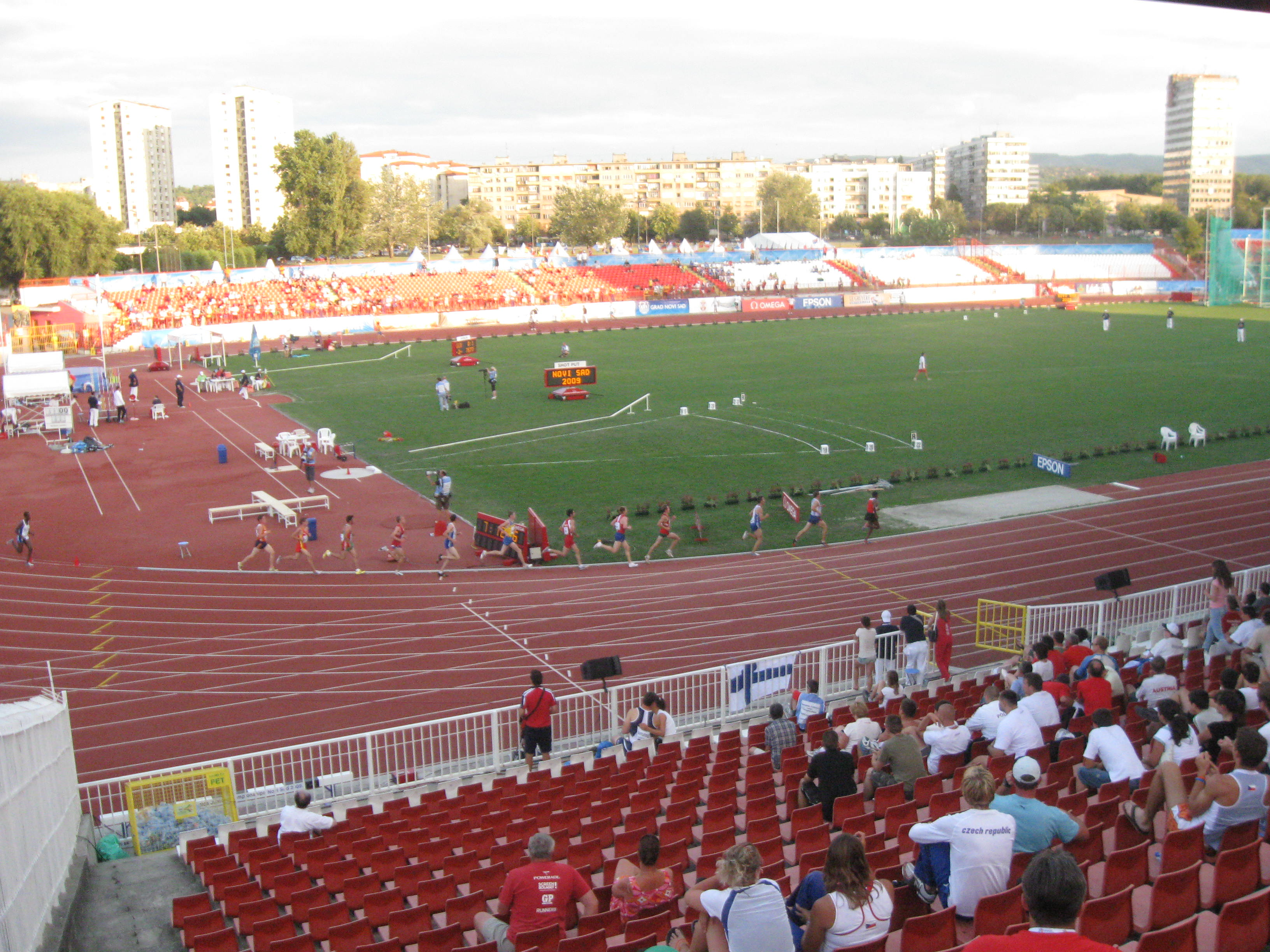
Stadion Karađorđe

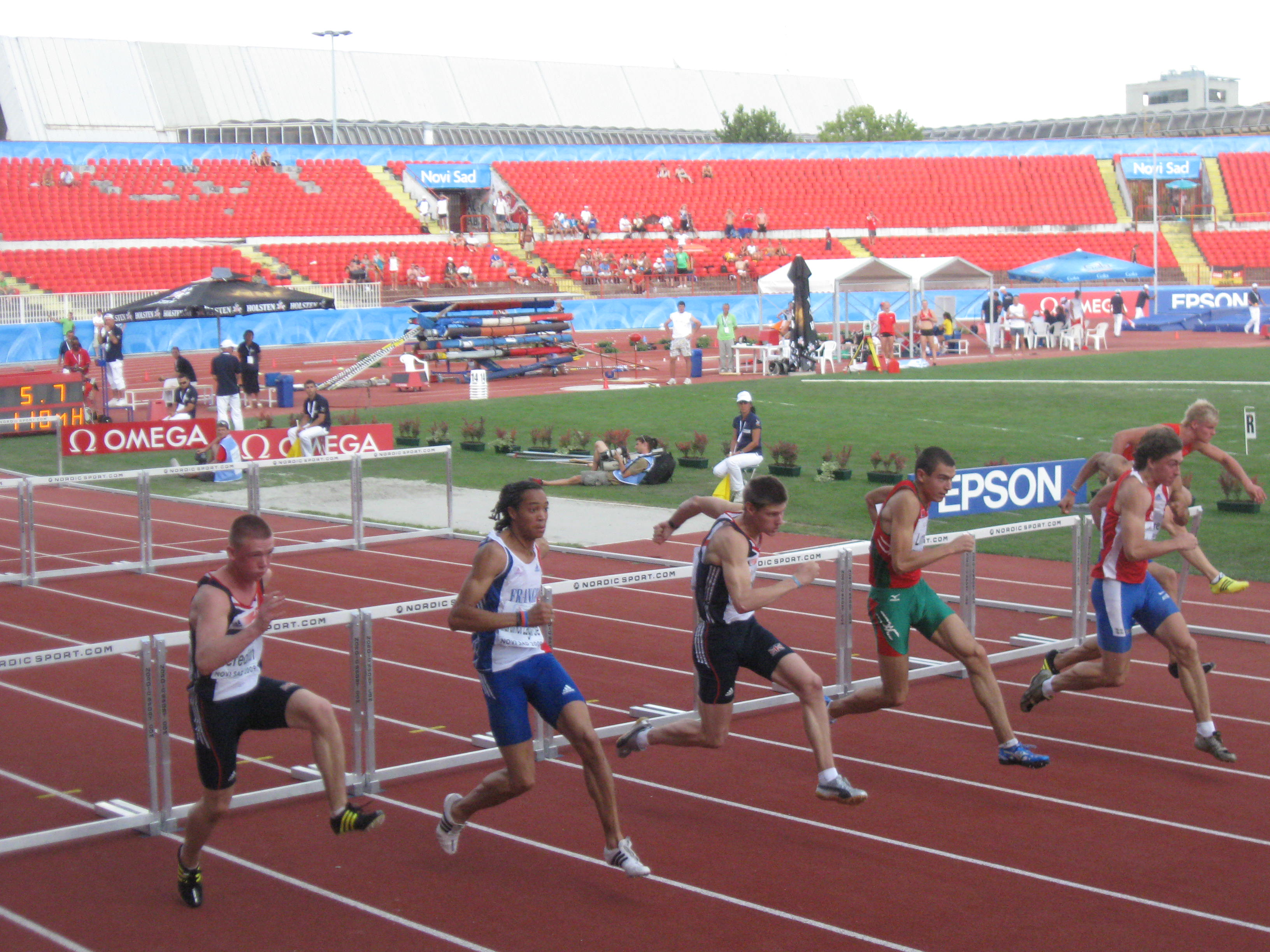
110m hurdles race (m)

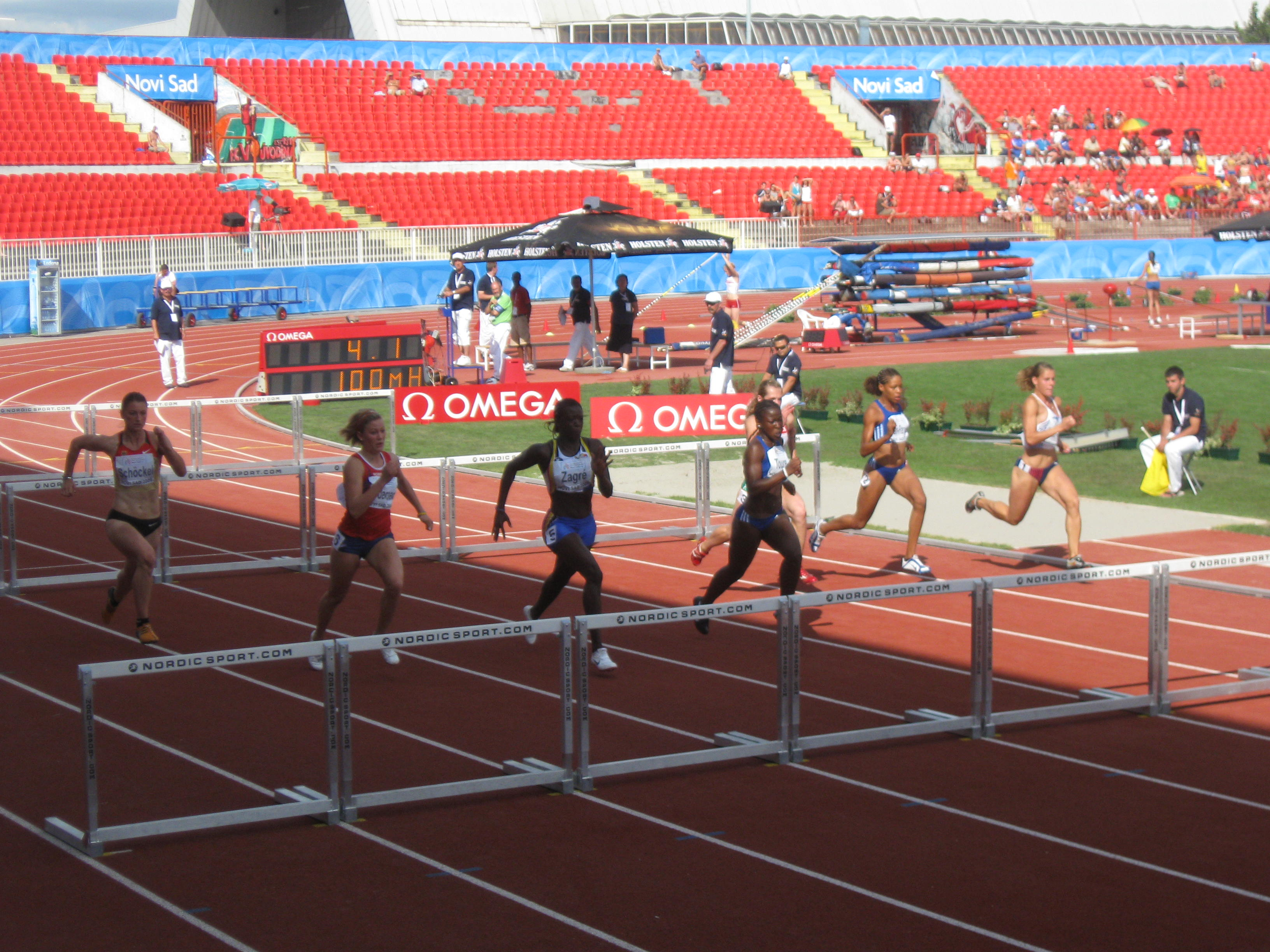
100m hurdles race (w)

Rank	Nation	Gold	Silver	Bronze	Total
1	Germany (GER)	10	8	7	25
2	Russia (RUS)	9	7	6	22
3	Ukraine (UKR)	4	1	0	5
4	Great Britain (GBR)	3	5	7	15
5	Azerbaijan (AZE)	3	3	0	6
6	Romania (ROU)	3	1	1	5
7	Spain (ESP)	3	0	2	5
8	Norway (NOR)	2	2	0	4
9	Belgium (BEL)	2	0	1	3
10	Serbia (SRB)	1	2	0	3
11	Belarus (BLR)	1	0	4	5
12	Croatia (CRO)	1	0	1	2
12	France (FRA)	1	0	1	2
14	Estonia (EST)	1	0	0	1
15	Poland (POL)	0	5	3	8
16	Turkey (TUR)	0	3	1	4
17	Czech Republic (CZE)	0	2	0	2
17	Hungary (HUN)	0	2	0	2
19	Italy (ITA)	0	1	3	4
20	Sweden (SWE)	0	1	1	2
21	Montenegro (MNE)	0	1	0	1
22	Denmark (DEN)	0	0	1	1
22	Finland (FIN)	0	0	1	1
22	Latvia (LAT)	0	0	1	1
22	Netherlands (NED)	0	0	1	1
22	Portugal (POR)	0	0	1	1
22	Switzerland (SUI)	0	0	1	1
Totals (27 entries)		44	44	44	132
