= Yasmin Kwadwo =

German sprinter (born 1990)

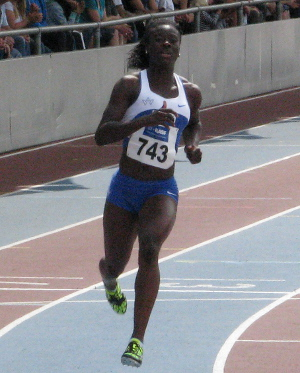
Kwadwo at the 2011 German World Championship trials

Yasmin Kwadwo (born 9 November 1990) is a German track and field athlete who competes in the sprints. Her personal best for the 100 metres is 11.29 seconds.

She won two gold medals at the European Athletics Junior Championships in 2009 and represented Germany at the 2010 IAAF World Indoor Championships. She was the 2010 German indoor champion in the 60 metres. She was a 100 m semi-finalist at the 2011 World Championships in Athletics. She is frequently selected for the German women's 4×100 metres relay team and came fourth at the 2013 World Championships in Athletics. She also won two silver medals at the 2013 European Team Championships.

== Career ==
Born in Recklinghausen to parents of Ghanaian origin, she moved to Wattenscheid with her family in 2001 and began to train in athletics with Slawomir Filipowski at the local club, TV Wattenscheid 01 Leichtathletik. In 2007, she was the 60 metres runner-up at the national junior championships, setting a best of 7.55 seconds, and ran a 100 metres best of 11.92 seconds to take third at the national youth championships. She improved these times to 7.48 and 11.66 seconds the following year and won both the national junior titles in the events. She was selected for the 2008 World Junior Championships in Athletics and represented Germany in the 100 m (reaching the semi-finals) and the 4×100 metres relay.

Kwadwo's first international medals came at the 2009 European Athletics Junior Championships, where she won gold medals in both the 100 m individual and relay events. She defended her junior titles and made progress in the senior ranks at the German Athletics Championships, coming fifth in the 60 m and sixth in the 100 m. She ended the year with bests of 7.38 and 11.38 seconds. In her first year of full senior competition, she won the German title in the 60 m with a best of 7.29 seconds and went to compete at the 2010 IAAF World Indoor Championships, where she reached the semi-final stage. She improved slightly outdoors, running 11.33 seconds for the 100 m and taking third at the German Championships, but had less success at the 2010 European Athletics Championships as she did not get past the heats of either the individual or relay events.

Despite suffering disqualification at the 2011 German Athletics Championships she was chosen to run the 100 m at the 2011 World Championships in Athletics and reached the semi-finals of the competition, achieving a best of 11.29 seconds in the process. The German 4×100 m relay again did not successfully finish the race. The next season she was second to Verena Sailer at the German indoors but managed a best of 7.28 seconds. However, an injury curtailed her season and, though selected, she missed the 2012 Summer Olympics. She relocated club to MTG Mannheim, training alongside her national rival Sailer.

In 2013, she did not compete extensively as an individual, though she did manage to win a silver medal at the 2013 European Team Championships and place third at the 2013 German Athletics Championships. Most of her success came in relay teams that year: Kwadwo and her teammates were second at the European Team Championships, first at that national championships, and placed fourth at the 2013 World Championships in Athletics as well as the Weltklasse Zürich meeting. At the start of 214 she set a new 60 m best of 7.26 but was again runner-up to Sailer nationally.

At the 2019 World Championships, she was part of the German 4 x 100 m team that finished in 5th place.

== Personal bests ==
- 60 metres – 7.24 sec (2015)
- 100 metres – 11.25 sec (2019)
