= Jeneba Tarmoh =

American sprinter (born 1989)

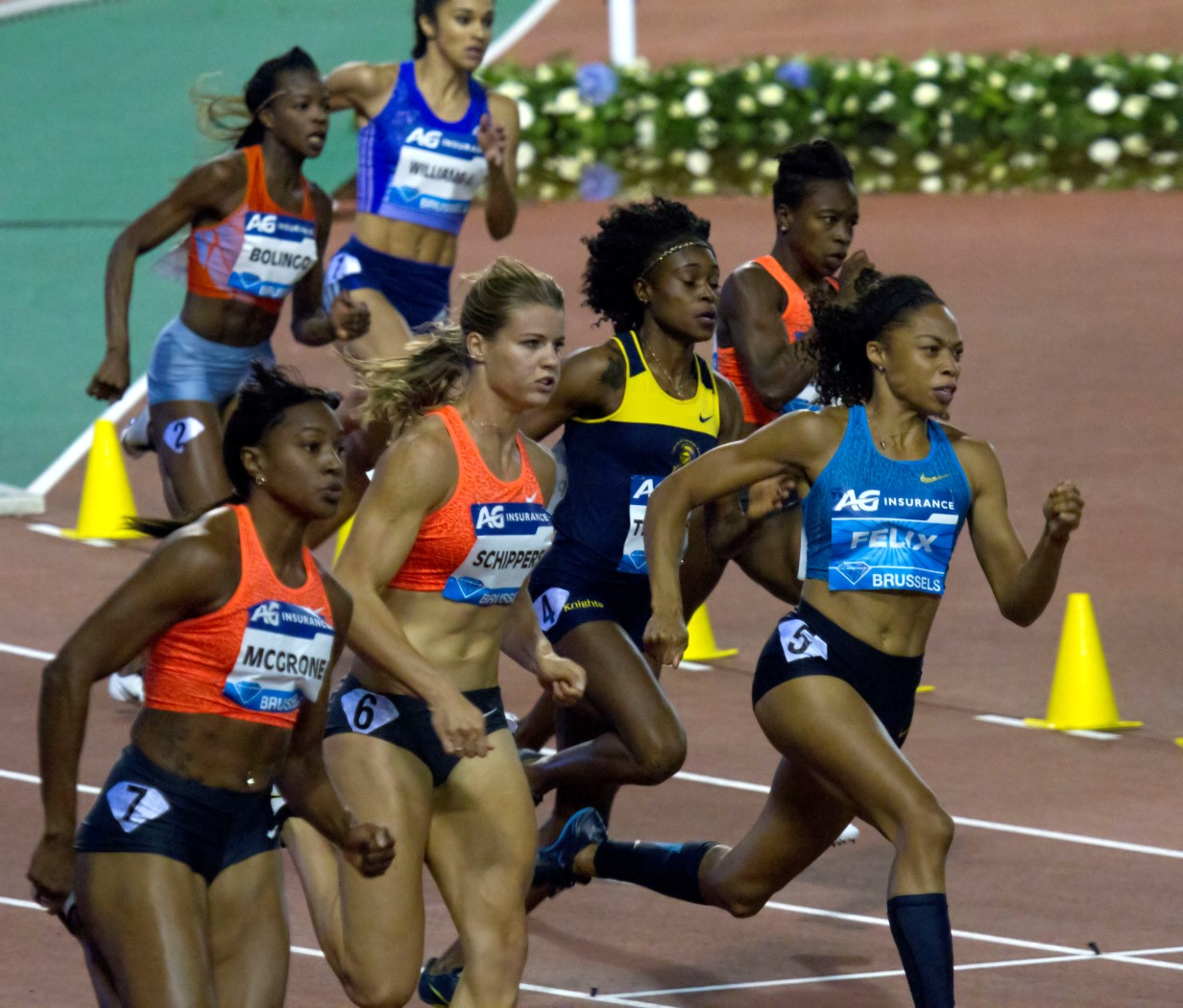
- Women 200 metres at 2015 Memorial Van Damme, Brussels: Candyce McGrone, Dafne Schippers, Elaine Thompson, Jeneba Tarmoh, Allyson Felix, Cynthia Bolingo and Jodie Williams.

Personal information
- Full name: Jeneba Sylvia Tarmoh
- Born: September 27, 1989 (age 37) Los Angeles, California, U.S.
- Height: 5 ft 5 in (165 cm)
- Weight: 130 lb (59 kg)
Medal record
Women's athletics
Representing the United States
Olympic Games
Gold medal – first place	2012 London	4 × 100 m relay
World Championships
Silver medal – second place	2013 Moscow	4 × 100 m relay
World Relay Championships
Gold medal – first place	2014 Nassau	4 × 100 m relay
World Junior Championships
Gold medal – first place	2006 Beijing	4 × 100 m relay
Gold medal – first place	2008 Bydgoszcz	100 m
Gold medal – first place	2008 Bydgoszcz	4 × 100 m relay
NACAC U-23 Championships
Gold medal – first place	2010 Miramar	100 meters
Gold medal – first place	2010 Miramar	4 × 100 m relay

Jeneba Sylvia Tarmoh (born September 27, 1989) is an American track and field sprinter who specializes in the 100 metres and 200 metres. She is of Sierra Leonean descent.

== Prep ==
Tarmoh lives in San Jose, California, where she attended Mt. Pleasant High School. Her parents, both nurses, immigrated to San Jose from Sierra Leone shortly before she was born. While at Mt. Pleasant, she won both the 100 meters and 200 meters at the CIF California State Meet both her 2006 junior and 2007 senior years. She was also part of the 2007 CIF State Championship team from Mt.Pleasant High School.

== College career ==
After first competing for the Tennessee Volunteers track and field team, Tarmoh was an All-American for Texas A&M University, helping them with back to back to back wins in the NCAA Track & Field Outdoor Championships 2009–2011 seasons. She gave up her final year of eligibility to compete in the NCAA after she went professional, signing with Nike. She came in third at the 2011 USA National Outdoor Championships in the 200 m behind Shalonda Solomon and Carmelita Jeter, earning her a place on the 2011 IAAF World Championships team.

== Olympic career ==
On June 23, 2012, Tarmoh finished in a dead heat with Allyson Felix for third place in the 100 m finals at the US Track and Field Olympic Trials. Tarmoh had initially been declared the third-place finisher immediately after the race but was dropped into a tie with Felix after officials reviewed images of the photo finish. The top three places qualified for the 2012 USA Olympic team for the 2012 Summer Olympics; however, USATF had no tiebreaker procedures in place at the time in the event of a tie for the final spot. After discussion, USATF officials decided that a runoff between the two sprinters would take place in the event that neither ceded her spot to the other. Tarmoh initially agreed to the runoff but later pulled out, ceding the spot to Felix. The event generated substantial criticism toward USATF officials for having insufficient procedures in place for breaking ties, as well as for forcing the runners to decide whether to participate in the eventual runoff.

Tarmoh traveled to London as a reserve on the US team. She ran the second leg of the women's 4 × 100 metres relay in the qualifying round. Although she did not compete in the finals, she received a gold medal as the USA set a world record in winning the finals.

== Personal Information ==
Tarmoh has also appeared in an episode of California On, where she was interviewed by comedian Kassem G.

== Personal bests ==
Event	Time	Venue	Date
100 m	10.93 (1.8 m/s)	Des Moines, Iowa	June 21, 2013
200 m	22.23 (-0.3 m/s)	Monaco	17 July 2015
