= Orlann Oliere =

French sprinter (born 1991)

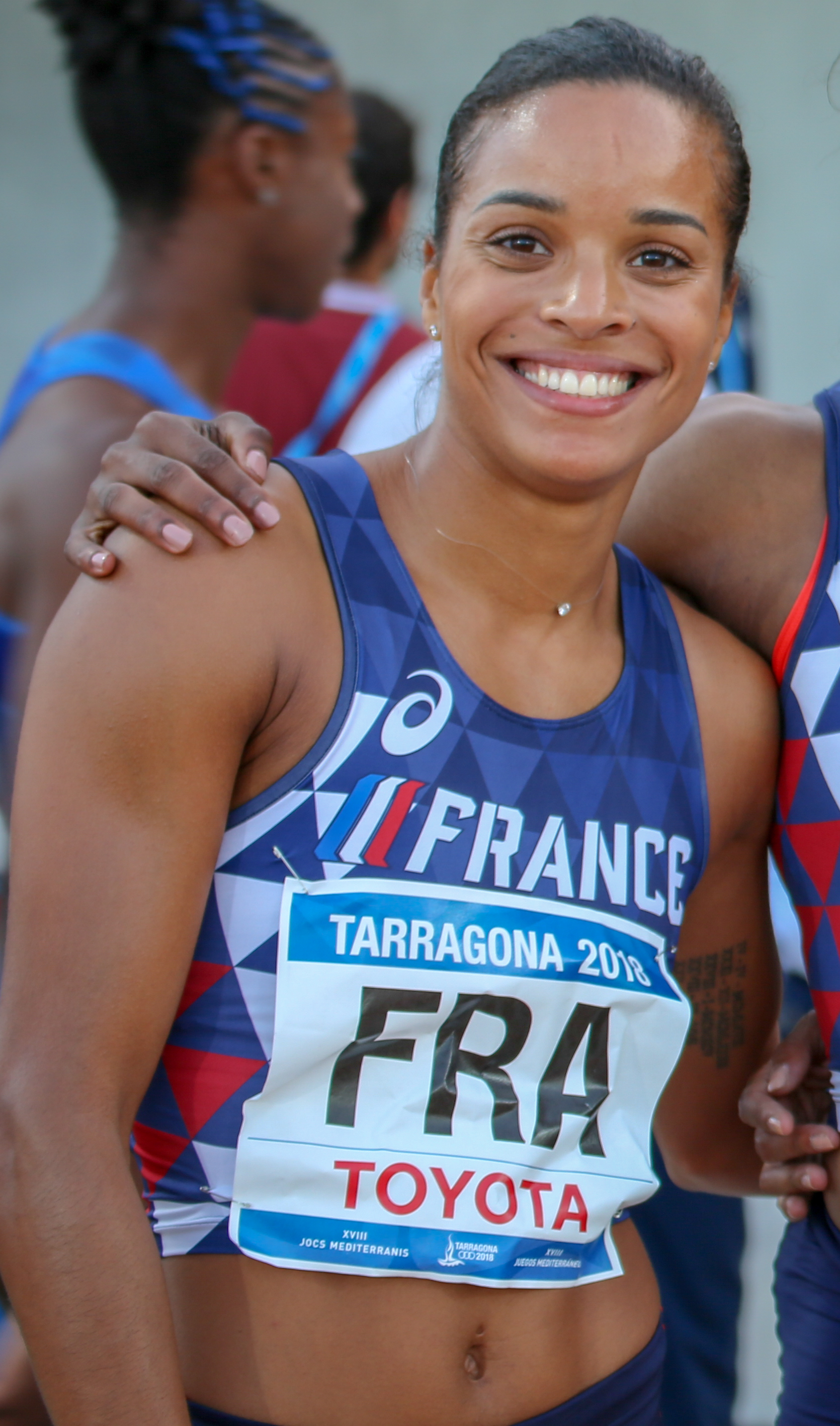
- Oliere in 2018

Personal information
- Born: Orlann Ombissa-Dzangue; 26 May 1991 (age 35) Sens, France
- Height: 1.68 m (5 ft 6 in)
- Weight: 60 kg (132 lb)

Sport
- Country: France
- Sport: Sprinting
- Event: 4 × 100 metres
- Club: CA Montreuil 93
- Coached by: Guy Ontanon
Medal record
Women's athletics
Representing France
European Championships
Silver medal – second place	2024 Rome	4 × 100 m relay

Orlann Oliere (née Ombissa-Dzangue; born 26 May 1991) is a French sprinter who specializes in the 100 metres. As a relay runner she won a silver medal at the 2011 European U23 Championships, and competed without reaching the final at the 2017 World Championships in Athletics. Her personal best time is 11.06 seconds, achieved in July 2018 in Albi.

== Personal life ==
Born in France, Orlann Oliere is of Gabonese descent.
