= Kadene Vassell =

Dutch sprinter (born 1989)

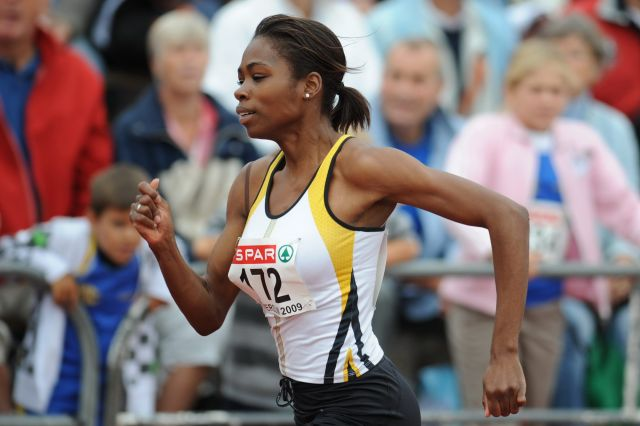

Personal information
- Full name: Kadene Vassell
- Born: 29 January 1989 (age 37) Morant Bay, Jamaica

Sport
- Country: Netherlands
- Sport: Athletics
- Event: Sprint

Achievements and titles
- Regional finals: 2nd at the 2012 European Athletics Championships
Medal record
Women's athletics
Representing the Netherlands
European Championships
Silver medal – second place	2012 Helsinki	4×100 m relay

Kadene Vassell (born 29 January 1989) is a Jamaican-born Dutch athlete, who competes in the sprint with personal best times of 11.42 seconds at the 100 m and 23.49 seconds at the 200 m event.

Vassell won the silver medal at the 2012 European Athletics Championships in Helsinki in the 4 × 100 m relay.

She competed for the Netherlands at the 2012 Summer Olympics.
