= Émilie Gaydu =

French athletics competitor

Emilia Gaydu (born 5 February 1989, Melun, France) is a French athlete, running as a sprint and relay specialist.

Of ancestry Guadeloupe, from Abymes, her best time in the 100 m was 11.38s, made at Antony on 25 June 2011 while in the 200m, she ran 23.24s at Charléty stadium on 14 July 2013 during the French Championships. Her best time in the 400m relay is 43.36s, at the Herculis meeting in Monaco on 19 July 2013. She won the gold medal at the Mediterranean Games in 2009 at Pescara.
