= 2011 European Athletics U23 Championships =

- Dates: 14–17 July 2011
- Host city: Ostrava, Czech Republic
- Venue: Městský stadion
- Level: Under 23
- Type: Outdoor
- Events: 44
- Participation: 899 athletes from 42 nations
- Records set: 6 CRs

The 8th European Athletics U23 Championships were held on 14–17 July 2011 in the Městský stadion in Ostrava, Czech Republic.

Russia topped the medal table with 20 medals in total, including 9 golds (after revision), before Great Britain, also with 20 medals, and Germany.

== Medal summary ==
=== Men ===
Event	Gold		Silver		Bronze	
100 metres	James Alaka; Great Britain	10.45	Michael Tumi; Italy	10.47	Andrew Robertson; Great Britain	10.52
200 metres	Lykourgos-Stefanos Tsakonas; Greece	20.56; PB	James Alaka; Great Britain	20.60	Pavel Maslák; Czech Republic	20.67
400 metres	Nigel Levine; Great Britain	46.10	Brian Gregan; Ireland	46.12; PB	Luke Lennon-Ford; Great Britain	46.22
800 metres	Adam Kszczot; Poland	1:46.71	Kevin López; Spain	1:46.93	Mukhtar Mohammed; Great Britain	1:48.01
1500 metres	Florian Carvalho; France	3:50.42	James Shane; Great Britain	3:50.58	David Bustos; Spain	3:50.59
5000 metres	Sindre Buraas; Norway	14:22.69	Ross Millington; Great Britain	14:22.78	Jesper van der Wielen; Netherlands	14:23.31
10,000 metres	Sondre Nordstad Moen; Norway	28:41.66; PB	Ahmed El Mazoury; Italy	28:46.97; PB	Musa Roba-Kinkal; Germany	28:57.91; SB
110 metres hurdles	Sergey Shubenkov; Russia	13.56	Balázs Baji; Hungary	13.58; PB	Lawrence Clarke; Great Britain	13.62
400 metres hurdles	Jack Green; Great Britain	49.13	Nathan Woodward; Great Britain	49.28	Emir Bekrić; Serbia	49.61; NR
3000 metres steeplechase	Sebastián Martos; Spain	8:35.35	Abdelaziz Merzougui; Spain	8:36.21	Alexandru Ghinea; Romania	8:38.51
4 × 100 metres relay	Michael Tumi; Francesco Basciani; Davide Manenti; Delmas Obou; Italy	39.05	Andrew Robertson; Kieran Showler-Davis; Richard Kilty; Daniel Talbot; Great Britain	39.10	Florian Hübner; Maximilian Kessler; Robin Erewa; Felix Göltl; Germany	39.19
4 × 400 metres relay	Nigel Levine; Thomas Phillips; Jamie Bowie; Luke Lennon-Ford; Great Britain	3:03.53	Michał Pietrzak; Jakub Krzewina; Łukasz Krawczuk; Mateusz Fórmanski; Poland	3:03.62	Aleksey Kenig; Anton Volobuev; Artem Vazhov; Vladimir Krasnov; Russia	3:04.01
20 km walk	Dawid Tomala; Poland	1:24:21	Denis Strelkov; Russia	1:24:25	Valeriy Filipchuk; Russia	1:24:30
High jump	Bohdan Bondarenko; Ukraine	2.30; PB	Sergey Mudrov; Russia	2.30; PB	Miguel Ángel Sancho; Spain	2.21 =SB
Pole vault	Paweł Wojciechowski; Poland	5.70; PB	Karsten Dilla; Germany	5.60	Dmitriy Zhelyabin; Russia	5.55; PB
Long jump	Aleksandr Menkov; Russia	8.08	Marcos Chuva; Portugal	7.94	Guillaume Victorin; France	7.86; PB
Triple jump	Sheryf El-Sheryf; Ukraine	17.72; CR	Aleksey Fyodorov; Russia	16.85	Yuriy Kovalyov; Russia	16.82
Shot put	David Storl; Germany	20.45; CR	Dmytro Savytskyy; Ukraine	19.18; PB	Marin Premeru; Croatia	18.83
Discus throw	Lawrence Okoye; Great Britain	60.70	Mykyta Nesterenko; Ukraine	59.67	Fredrik Amundgård; Norway	59.42; SB
Hammer throw	Paweł Fajdek; Poland	78.54; PB	Javier Cienfuegos; Spain	73.03	Aleh Dubitski; Belarus	72.52
Javelin throw	Till Wöschler; Germany	84.38; PB	Fatih Avan; Turkey	84.11	Dmitry Tarabin; Russia	83.18
Decathlon	Thomas Van der Plaetsen; Belgium	8157; NR PB	Eduard Mikhan; Belarus	8152; PB	Mihail Dudaš; Serbia	8117; NR PB

=== Women ===
Event	Gold		Silver		Bronze	
100 metres *	Andreea Ograzeanu; Romania	11.65	Leena Günther; Germany	11.75	Anna Kiełbasińska; Poland	11.77
200 metres *	Anna Kiełbasińska; Poland	23.23; PB	Moa Hjelmer; Sweden	23.24	Marit Dopheide; Netherlands	23.32
400 metres	Olga Topilskaya; Russia	51.45	Yuliya Terekhova; Russia	52.63	Lena Schmidt; Germany	52.66
800 metres **	Merve Aydin; Turkey	2:00.46; SB	Lynsey Sharp; Great Britain	2:00.65; PB	Aleksandra Bulanova; Russia	2:01.40
1500 metres **	Tuğba Karakaya; Turkey	4:20.80	Corinna Harrer; Germany	4:21.52	Katarzyna Broniatowska; Poland	4:22.06
5000 metres	Layes Abdullayeva; Azerbaijan	15:29.47; NR	Yekaterina Gorbunova; Russia	15:45.14	Stevie Stockton; Great Britain	15:58.51; PB
10,000 metres	Layes Abdullayeva; Azerbaijan	32:18.05; CR	Lyudmyla Kovalenko; Ukraine	33:35.36	Catarina Ribeiro; Portugal	34:10.39; PB
100 metres hurdles	Alina Talay; Belarus	12.91; SB	Lisa Urech; Switzerland	13.00	Cindy Roleder; Germany	13.10
400 metres hurdles	Hanna Yaroshchuk; Ukraine	54.77; PB	Hanna Titimets; Ukraine	54.91	Meghan Beesley; Great Britain	55.69; PB
3000 metres steeplechase	Gülcan Mingir; Turkey	9:47.83	Jana Sussmann; Germany	9:48.01	Mariya Shatalova; Ukraine	9:48.22; SB
4 × 100 metres relay *	Yekaterina Filatova; Alena Tamkova; Yekaterina Kuzina; Nina Argunova; Russia	44.14	Yariatou Toure; Sarah Goujon; Orlann Ombissa; Cornnelly Calydon; France	44.26	Annabelle Lewis; Emily Diamond; Torema Thompson; Asha Philip; Great Britain	44.34
4 × 400 metres relay	Yevgeniya Subbotina; Yekaterina Yefimova; Yuliya Terekheva; Olga Topilskaya; Russia	3:27.72	Kateryna Plyashechuk; Alina Lohvynenko; Hanna Yaroshchuk; Yuilya Olishevska; Ukraine	3:30.13	Clemence Sorgnard; Marie Gayot; Elea-Mariama Diarra; Floria Gueï; France	3:31.73
20 km walk	Julia Takács; Spain	1:31:55	Antonella Palmisano; Italy	1:36:26	Eleonora Giorgi; Italy	1:38:41
High jump	Esthera Petre; Romania	1.98 =CR	Oksana Okuneva; Ukraine	1.94; PB	Burcu Ayhan; Turkey	1.94; NR
Pole vault	Holly Bleasdale; Great Britain	4.55	Katerina Stefanidi; Greece	4.45; PB	Annika Roloff; Germany	4.40; PB
Long jump	Darya Klishina; Russia	7.05; CR	Ivana Španović; Serbia	6.74; SB	Sosthene Moguenara; Germany	6.74; PB
Triple jump	Paraskevi Parahristou; Greece	14.40	Carmen Toma; Romania	13.92	Anna Jagaciak; Poland	13.86
Shot put	Yevgeniya Kolodko; Russia	18.87	Sophie Kleeberg; Germany	17.92; PB	Melissa Boekelman; Netherlands	17.88
Discus throw	Julia Fischer; Germany	59.60; PB	Nastassia Kashtanava; Belarus	56.25	Anita Márton; Hungary	54.14
Hammer throw	Bianca Perie; Romania	71.59; CR	Joanna Fiodorow; Poland	70.06; PB	Sophie Hitchon; Great Britain	69.59; NR
Javelin throw	Sarah Mayer; Germany	59.29; PB	Vira Rebryk; Ukraine	58.95	Oona Sormunen; Finland	58.54
Heptathlon	Grit Šadeiko; Estonia	6134; PB	Kateřina Cachová; Czech Republic	6123; PB	Yana Maksimava; Belarus	6075

Notes: Darya Pizhankova of Ukraine originally won three medals in 100 m, 200 m and 4 x 100 m relay but was later disqualified for doping and stripped of medals. Ulyana Lepska who also ran in the winning relay was found guilty of the same offence. Elena Arzhakova of Russia originally won two gold medals in the 800 m and 1500 m, but was later disqualified for doping and stripped of medals. The medal standings and record have been updated to reflect the reallocation of those medals.

== Medal table ==
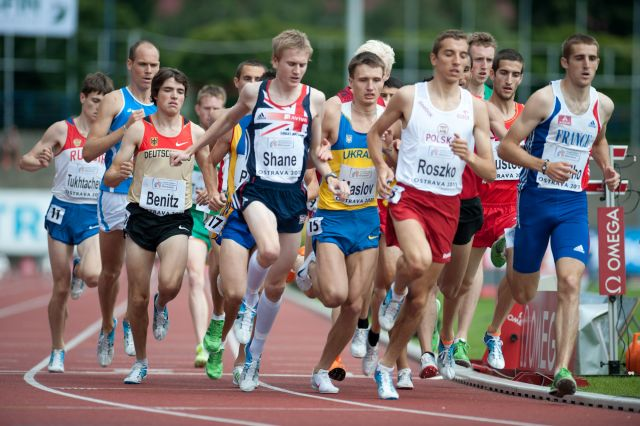
Men's 1500m heat.

* Host nation (Czech Republic)

Rank	Nation	Gold	Silver	Bronze	Total
1	Russia	9	5	6	20
2	Great Britain	6	6	8	20
3	Germany	4	4	7	15
4	Poland	4	3	3	10
5	Ukraine	3	7	1	11
6	Romania	3	1	1	5
6	Turkey	3	1	1	5
8	Greece	2	1	0	3
9	Norway	2	0	1	3
10	Azerbaijan	2	0	0	2
11	Spain	1	3	3	7
12	Belarus	1	2	2	5
13	Italy	1	2	0	3
14	France	1	0	3	4
15	Belgium	1	0	0	1
15	Estonia	1	0	0	1
17	Serbia	0	1	2	3
18	Czech Republic*	0	1	1	2
18	Hungary	0	1	1	2
18	Portugal	0	1	1	2
21	Ireland	0	1	0	1
21	Sweden	0	1	0	1
21	Switzerland	0	1	0	1
24	Netherlands	0	0	3	3
25	Croatia	0	0	1	1
25	Finland	0	0	1	1
Totals (26 entries)		44	42	46	132

== Participating nations ==
According to an unofficial count, 899 athletes from 42 countries participated in the event.

- Armenia (1)
- Austria (8)
- Azerbaijan (3)
- Belarus (21)
- Belgium (16)
- Bulgaria (11)
- Croatia (10)
- Cyprus (9)
- Czech Republic (33) (host)
- Denmark (8)
- Estonia (15)
- Finland (29)
- France (66)
- Georgia (2)
- Germany (69)
- Great Britain (39)
- Greece (12)
- Hungary (19)
- Iceland (3)
- Ireland (19/20)
- Israel (8)
- Italy (49)
- Latvia (15/17)
- Lithuania (14)
- Macedonia (2)
- Malta (2)
- Moldova (1)
- Monaco (1)
- Netherlands (25)
- Norway (29)
- Poland (65)
- Portugal (19)
- Romania (27/30)
- Russia (58)
- Serbia (9)
- Slovakia (7)
- Slovenia (6)
- Spain (47)
- Sweden (36/35)
- Switzerland (24)
- Turkey (19)
- Ukraine (43)
