= 2009 European Athletics U23 Championships – Women's 100 metres =

The women's 100 metres event at the 2009 European Athletics U23 Championships was held in Kaunas, Lithuania, at S. Dariaus ir S. Girėno stadionas (Darius and Girėnas Stadium) on 16 and 17 July.

== Medalists ==
Gold	Lina Grinčikaitė; Lithuania
Silver	Nataliya Pohrebnyak; Ukraine
Bronze	Marika Popowicz; Poland

== Results ==
=== Final ===
17 July
Wind: 0.2 m/s

Rank	Name	Nationality	Time	Notes
1st place, gold medalist(s)	Lina Grinčikaitė	Lithuania	11.37	
2nd place, silver medalist(s)	Nataliya Pohrebnyak	Ukraine	11.45	
3rd place, bronze medalist(s)	Marika Popowicz	Poland	11.50	
4	Ezinne Okparaebo	Norway	11.53	
5	Elaine O'Neill	United Kingdom	11.61	
6	Marina Panteleyeva	Russia	11.66	
7	Mariya Ryemyen	Ukraine	11.66	
8	Émilie Gaydu	France	11.82	

=== Semifinals ===
16 July
first 3 in each heat and 2 best to the Final

==== Semifinal 1 ====
Wind: -0.5 m/s

Rank	Name	Nationality	Time	Notes
1	Lina Grinčikaitė	Lithuania	11.47	Q
2	Marika Popowicz	Poland	11.50	Q
3	Mariya Ryemyen	Ukraine	11.64	Q
4	Kateřina Čechová	Czech Republic	11.75	
5	Amparo María Cotán	Spain	11.80	
6	Audrey Alloh	Italy	11.83	
7	Louise Kiernan	Ireland	11.88	
8	Céline Distel	France	11.90	

==== Semifinal 2 ====
Rank	Name	Nationality	Time	Notes
1	Nataliya Pohrebnyak	Ukraine	11.54	Q
2	Ezinne Okparaebo	Norway	11.58	Q
3	Elaine O'Neill	United Kingdom	11.68	Q
4	Marina Panteleyeva	Russia	11.73	q
5	Émilie Gaydu	France	11.73	q
6	Weronika Wedler	Poland	11.82	
7	Katsiaryna Shumak	Belarus	11.95	
8	Ilenia Draisci	Italy	12.10	

=== Heats ===
16 July
Qualified: first 3 in each heat and 4 best to the Semifinals

==== Heat 1 ====
Wind: -1.6 m/s

Rank	Name	Nationality	Time	Notes
1	Lina Grinčikaitė	Lithuania	11.65	Q
2	Kateřina Čechová	Czech Republic	11.90	Q
3	Katsiaryna Shumak	Belarus	12.00	Q
4	Ilenia Draisci	Italy	12.05	q
5	Yekaterina Filatova	Russia	12.09	
6	Barbora Šimková	Slovakia	12.16	
7	Agnieszka Ceglarek	Poland	12.16	
8	Amy Foster	Ireland	12.33	

==== Heat 2 ====
Wind: -1.2 m/s

Rank	Name	Nationality	Time	Notes
1	Mariya Ryemyen	Ukraine	11.71	Q
2	Marika Popowicz	Poland	11.72	Q
3	Audrey Alloh	Italy	11.89	Q
4	Céline Distel	France	11.93	q
5	Louise Kiernan	Ireland	12.01	q
6	Anna Olsson	Denmark	12.13	
7	Lina Andrijauskaitė	Lithuania	12.17	
	Ana Torrijos	Spain	DQ	Rule 162.7

==== Heat 3 ====
Wind: -2.0 m/s

Rank	Name	Nationality	Time	Notes
1	Nataliya Pohrebnyak	Ukraine	11.77	Q
2	Weronika Wedler	Poland	11.95	Q
3	Amparo María Cotán	Spain	11.96	Q
4	Claire Brady	Ireland	12.06	
5	Lucienne M'belu	France	12.08	
6	Julia Skugge	Sweden	12.23	
7	Ivana Rožman	North Macedonia	12.49	
8	Ramona Papaioannou	Cyprus	12.57	

==== Heat 4 ====
Wind: -0.8 m/s

Rank	Name	Nationality	Time	Notes
1	Ezinne Okparaebo	Norway	11.64	Q
2	Elaine O'Neill	United Kingdom	11.69	Q
3	Marina Panteleyeva	Russia	11.78	Q
4	Émilie Gaydu	France	11.85	q
5	Edina Pál	Hungary	12.10	
6	Silvia Riba	Spain	12.16	
7	Jessica Paoletta	Italy	12.19	

== Participation ==
According to an unofficial count, 31 athletes from 18 countries participated in the event.

- Belarus (1)
- Cyprus (1)
- Czech Republic (1)
- Denmark (1)
- France (3)
- Hungary (1)
- Ireland (3)
- Italy (3)
- Lithuania (2)
- North Macedonia (1)
- Norway (1)
- Poland (3)
- Russia (2)
- Slovakia (1)
- Spain (3)
- Sweden (1)
- Ukraine (2)
- United Kingdom (1)
