= Athletics at the 2013 Asian Youth Games =

- Venue: Nanjing Olympic Sports Centre
- Dates: 19–22 August 2013

At the 2013 Asian Youth Games, the athletics events were held in Nanjing, Jiangsu province in China from 19–22 August. A total of 34 events were contested, split evenly between the sexes. The Nanjing Olympic Sports Centre was the host stadium for the athletics – this was the venue's second hosting of a multi-sport event after the 2005 National Games of China.

The events attracted average crowds of 20,000 people per day to the stadium. The competition was open to any youth athletes aged fifteen or sixteen. It was part of the buildup to the 2014 Youth Olympics, to be held at the same location. A total of 376 athletes from 37 nations participated at the event. Indian athletes were entered as Independent Olympic Participants due to the suspension of the Indian Olympic Association. Poor organisation between the Athletics Federation of India and the national association meant the country sent eighteen athletes who was born before 1997 and could not compete due to their being over the age limit. One of Myanmar's two entrants was dismissed for the same reason.

The host nation China easily topped the medal table, taking over half the available gold medals (18) and ending the competition with a total of 33 medals. Japan won the next most gold medals with four in their haul of nine medals. Third and fourth placers Thailand and Chinese Taipei shared the second largest medal hauls, each having three golds in their totals of eleven medals. Sri Lanka entered ten athletes, four of them won a medal for their country. Three of North Korea's four entrants also won a medal. Eighteen teams reached the medal table.

Chinese sprinter Huang Guifen was the only athlete to win two gold medals, having won the girl's 200 metres and 400 metres events. Japan's Yume Ando was a double silver medallist in the boy's throws (discus and shot put) and Nutthapong Veeravongratanasiri of Thailand was runner-up in both the boy's short sprints. A fourth multiple medallist was Iranian Ata Asadi who reached the podium in both middle-distance running events. The standard of performances was much higher than the inaugural edition in 2009 and only ten of the games records from that event went unbeaten. Twenty-six new games records were set, with eight new events being introduced (200 m, 3000 metres, 2000 m steeplechase and hammer throw for both sexes).

The team of athletics officials was led by Singapore's Maurice R. Nicholas, one of the country's top coaches. An anti-doping programme was led by Japan's Fumihiro Yamasawa.

Several athletes who competed at the 2013 World Youth Championships in Athletics a month previously were present at the games.

== Medalists ==
=== Boys ===
Event	Gold		Silver		Bronze	
100 m	Xia Zhenkun; China	10.71	Nutthapong Veeravongratanasiri; Thailand	10.73	Yang Chun-han; Chinese Taipei	10.73
200 m	Yang Chun-han; Chinese Taipei	21.47	Nutthapong Veeravongratanasiri; Thailand	21.57	Kenichi Shioyama; Japan	21.76
400 m	Xu Zhihang; China	48.39	Liu Yu-che; Chinese Taipei	49.21	Hu Guihao; China	49.54
800 m	Lee Sang-min; South Korea	1:54.64	Chaowanon Rattanapan; Thailand	1:55.75	Ata Asadi; Iran	1:56.73
1500 m	Wang Wei; China	4:03.75	Ata Asadi; Iran	4:05.09	Ajay Kumar Saroj; Independent Olympic Athletes	4:05.76
3000 m	Liu Hongliang; China	8:25.86	Chikashi Ikeda; Japan	8:45.04	Abhishek Pal; Independent Olympic Athletes	8:45.72
110 m hurdles	Takumu Furuya; Japan	13.36	Akila Ravisanka; Sri Lanka	13.99	Cheng Chi-hung; Chinese Taipei	14.06
400 m hurdles	Witthawat Thumcha; Thailand	52.79	Javad Shouryabi; Iran	53.89	Anuradha Vidushanka; Sri Lanka	54.05
2000 m steeplechase	Ma Hu; China	5:53.16	Ainikeerjiang Aihemaiti; China	6:00.31	Mohammed Rageh; Yemen	6:18.38
High jump	Yuji Hiramatsu; Japan	2.06	Arian Zarekani; Iran	2.03	Norshafiee Shah; Malaysia	2.00
Pole vault	Hussain Al-Hizam; Saudi Arabia	4.70	Muntadher Faleh; Iraq	4.60	Afiq Ahmad Alham; Malaysia	4.50
Long jump	Huang Chun-sheng; Chinese Taipei	7.23	Li Jie; China	6.98	Kim Hyun-jong; South Korea	6.98
Triple jump	Khathawut Meanim; Thailand	15.11	Ivan Solovyev; Kazakhstan	14.86	Gao Zhilin; China	14.78
Shot put	Han Jianping; China	18.87	Yume Ando; Japan	18.07	Huo Cheng; China	17.00
Discus throw	Cheng Yulong; China	62.03	Yume Ando; Japan	53.50	Shi Yang; China	49.85
Hammer throw	Ding Yuanbo; China	73.73	Zoir Sheraliev; Tajikistan	62.44	Hussein Thamer; Iraq	62.11
Javelin throw	Tsai Jen-wei; Chinese Taipei	70.41	Su Zhuqing; China	67.51	Lee Sung-ming; Chinese Taipei	65.63

=== Girls ===
Event	Gold		Silver		Bronze	
100 m	Ge Manqi; China	11.91	Parichat Charoensuk; Thailand	12.19	Kanchanaporn Sintaksab; Thailand	12.26
200 m	Huang Guifen; China	23.82	Wang Xuan; China	24.35	Yuna Otake; Japan	24.41
400 m	Huang Guifen; China	53.65	Lin Yu-chieh; Chinese Taipei	55.78	Nirmali Madushika; Sri Lanka	55.96
800 m	Anjana Thamke; Independent Olympic Athletes	2:11.47	Savinder Kaur; Malaysia	2:14.14	Dilhani Fernando; Sri Lanka	2:15.72
1500 m	Zhao Guoyu; China	4:35.06	Aprilia Kartina; Indonesia	4:36.65	Park Young-sun; South Korea	4:38.97
3000 m	Fukiko Ando; Japan	9:23.50	Ju Ok-byol; North Korea	9:51.78	Paek Hyong-yong; North Korea	9:55.08
100 m hurdles	Nana Fujimori; Japan	13.69	Nguyễn Thị Lan; Vietnam	14.43	Ken Ayuthaya Purnama; Indonesia	14.45
400 m hurdles	Yu Ying; China	1:03.28	Anastassiya Sergeyeva; Kazakhstan	1:03.87	Jong Kyong-suk; North Korea	1:05.00
2000 m steeplechase	Fatima Raya; Syria	7:07.82	Trần Thị Mai; Vietnam	7:29.34	Enkhbayaryn Ariuntungalag; Mongolia	7:35.50
High jump	Guan Luwei; China	1.65	Chai Yanbo; China	1.60	Krobkaew Taemsri; Thailand	1.60
Pole vault	Li Chaoqun; China	4.00	Yang Shuting; China	3.55	Lin Tsai-ying; Chinese Taipei	3.55
Long jump	Nguyễn Thị Trúc Mai; Vietnam	5.90	Hong Jingwen; China	5.78	Parinya Chuaimaroeng; Thailand	5.61
Triple jump	Ma Yue; China	12.55	Rochelle Macfarlane; Independent Olympic Athletes	12.38	Lee Hyeon-jeong; South Korea	12.28
Shot put	Dong Yu; China	16.84	Jeong Yu-sun; South Korea	15.26	Jiao Yaping; China	14.95
Discus throw	Sun Kangping; China	49.28	Zhang Wenjun; China	44.87	Pimpisa Songnoo; Thailand	36.37
Hammer throw	Mingkamon Koomphon; Thailand	59.58	Jiang Mingzhu; China	56.33	Zhang Chenyu; China	51.73
Javelin throw	Kang Young-in; South Korea	54.31	Chang Wan-chi; Chinese Taipei	47.75	Lee Yi-hua; Chinese Taipei	46.40

== Medal table ==
Rank	Nation	Gold	Silver	Bronze	Total
1	China (CHN)	18	9	6	33
2	Japan (JPN)	4	3	2	9
3	Thailand (THA)	3	4	4	11
4	Chinese Taipei (TPE)	3	3	5	11
5	South Korea (KOR)	2	1	3	6
6	Vietnam (VIE)	1	2	0	3
7	Independent Olympic Athletes (AOI)	1	1	2	4
8	Saudi Arabia (KSA)	1	0	0	1
8	Syria (SYR)	1	0	0	1
10	Iran (IRI)	0	3	1	4
11	Kazakhstan (KAZ)	0	2	0	2
12	Sri Lanka (SRI)	0	1	3	4
13	Malaysia (MAS)	0	1	2	3
13	North Korea (PRK)	0	1	2	3
15	Indonesia (INA)	0	1	1	2
15	Iraq (IRQ)	0	1	1	2
17	Tajikistan (TJK)	0	1	0	1
18	Mongolia (MGL)	0	0	1	1
18	Yemen (YEM)	0	0	1	1
Totals (19 entries)		34	34	34	102

== Results ==
=== Boys ===
==== 100 m ====
===== Round 1 =====
19 August

Rank	Athlete	Time
Heat 1
1	Nutthapong Veeravongratanasiri (THA)	10.85
2	Lee Hong Kit (HKG)	11.16
3	Syzani Abdul Wahid (SIN)	11.27
4	Arosha Kariyawasam (SRI)	11.35
5	Ali Anaal (MDV)	11.63
6	Aymin Al-Amri (OMA)	11.77
7	Damdinchimegiin Shinebayar (MGL)	11.78
8	Ho Chi Fong (MAC)	12.35
Heat 2
1	Xia Zhenkun (CHN)	10.85
2	Cheng Po-yu (TPE)	11.10
3	Ashok Kumar Halder (BAN)	11.54
4	Vladislav Grigoryev (KAZ)	11.61
5	Hussain Shahudhaan Fahumee (MDV)	11.69
6	Wan Ieng Kit (MAC)	11.82
7	Mohebullah Akram (AFG)	13.69
—	Mohit (AOI)	DNS
Heat 3
1	Kenichi Shioyama (JPN)	11.04
2	Wang Shengli (CHN)	11.13
3	Meshaal Al-Mutairi (KUW)	11.16
4	Kim Hyun-ho (KOR)	11.21
5	Mohamed Saad (BRN)	11.51
6	Mohammed Al-Ali (QAT)	12.15
7	Tashi Dendup (BHU)	12.85
Heat 4
1	Yang Chun-han (TPE)	10.84
2	Naludol Asavaruengsri (THA)	11.22
3	Jaloliddin Khamrokulov (UZB)	11.61
4	Ganboldyn Ankhbayar (MGL)	11.73
5	Salim Al-Abri (OMA)	11.73
6	Saeed Al-Ameeri (BRN)	11.82
—	Soumyadeep Saha (AOI)	DNS

===== Semifinals =====
20 August

Rank	Athlete	Time
Heat 1
1	Nutthapong Veeravongratanasiri (THA)	10.67
2	Xia Zhenkun (CHN)	10.68
3	Cheng Po-yu (TPE)	10.87
4	Arosha Kariyawasam (SRI)	11.08
5	Lee Hong Kit (HKG)	11.13
6	Syzani Abdul Wahid (SIN)	11.18
7	Mohamed Saad (BRN)	11.29
8	Ashok Kumar Halder (BAN)	11.47
Heat 2
1	Yang Chun-han (TPE)	10.72
2	Kenichi Shioyama (JPN)	10.96
3	Wang Shengli (CHN)	11.14
4	Meshaal Al-Mutairi (KUW)	11.15
5	Naludol Asavaruengsri (THA)	11.16
6	Kim Hyun-ho (KOR)	11.33
7	Vladislav Grigoryev (KAZ)	11.47
8	Jaloliddin Khamrokulov (UZB)	11.59

===== Final =====
20 August

Rank	Athlete	Time
1st place, gold medalist(s)	Xia Zhenkun (CHN)	10.71
2nd place, silver medalist(s)	Nutthapong Veeravongratanasiri (THA)	10.73
3rd place, bronze medalist(s)	Yang Chun-han (TPE)	10.73
4	Kenichi Shioyama (JPN)	10.84
5	Cheng Po-yu (TPE)	11.06
6	Arosha Kariyawasam (SRI)	11.19
7	Wang Shengli (CHN)	11.19
8	Lee Hong Kit (HKG)	11.63

==== 200 m ====
===== Round 1 =====
21 August

Rank	Athlete	Time
Heat 1
1	Peerapong Saensena (THA)	22.50
2	Akbar Saputra (INA)	22.74
3	Isuru Wijeratne (SRI)	23.29
4	Ali Anaal (MDV)	23.76
5	Cheong Ion Fat (MAC)	25.40
—	Ebrahim Ahmadzadeh (IRI)	DNS
Heat 2
1	Kenichi Shioyama (JPN)	22.13
2	Chen Li (CHN)	22.20
3	Cheng Po-yu (TPE)	22.32
4	Meshaal Al-Mutairi (KUW)	22.53
5	Mohammed Al-Ali (QAT)	23.78
6	Zandantulgyn Gereltulga (MGL)	24.95
7	Pema Thinley (BHU)	25.47
Heat 3
1	Nutthapong Veeravongratanasiri (THA)	22.54
2	Mohamed Saad (BRN)	22.81
3	Hussain Shahudhaan Fahumee (MDV)	22.94
4	Ashok Kumar Halder (BAN)	23.47
5	Sadegh Mardani (IRI)	23.67
6	Aymin Al-Amri (OMA)	23.77
7	Chan Si Chon (MAC)	24.86
Heat 4
1	Yang Chun-han (TPE)	22.14
2	Kim Hyun-ho (KOR)	22.58
3	Li Zhe (CHN)	22.63
4	Mohammad Al-Feras (KUW)	23.01
5	Jaloliddin Khamrokulov (UZB)	23.27
6	Salim Al-Abri (OMA)	23.35
7	Mohamed Al-Ghool (BRN)	23.94

===== Semifinals =====
22 August

Rank	Athlete	Time
Heat 1
1	Nutthapong Veeravongratanasiri (THA)	21.85
2	Chen Li (CHN)	22.08
3	Kenichi Shioyama (JPN)	22.08
4	Cheng Po-yu (TPE)	22.19
5	Meshaal Al-Mutairi (KUW)	22.67
6	Mohamed Saad (BRN)	22.89
7	Salim Al-Abri (OMA)	23.74
—	Isuru Wijeratne (SRI)	DNF
Heat 2
1	Yang Chun-han (TPE)	22.05
2	Li Zhe (CHN)	22.30
3	Peerapong Saensena (THA)	22.44
4	Kim Hyun-ho (KOR)	22.52
5	Akbar Saputra (INA)	22.54
6	Hussain Shahudhaan Fahumee (MDV)	23.02
7	Mohammad Al-Feras (KUW)	23.07
8	Jaloliddin Khamrokulov (UZB)	23.41

===== Final =====
22 August

Rank	Athlete	Time
1st place, gold medalist(s)	Yang Chun-han (TPE)	21.47
2nd place, silver medalist(s)	Nutthapong Veeravongratanasiri (THA)	21.57
3rd place, bronze medalist(s)	Kenichi Shioyama (JPN)	21.76
4	Cheng Po-yu (TPE)	22.17
5	Chen Li (CHN)	22.20
6	Peerapong Saensena (THA)	22.33
7	Kim Hyun-ho (KOR)	22.69
8	Li Zhe (CHN)	23.05

==== 400 m ====
20 August

Rank	Athlete	Time
1st place, gold medalist(s)	Xu Zhihang (CHN)	48.39
2nd place, silver medalist(s)	Liu Yu-che (TPE)	49.21
3rd place, bronze medalist(s)	Hu Guihao (CHN)	49.54
4	Trần Văn Luận (VIE)	49.96
5	Shehan Lakshitha (SRI)	50.51
6	Akbar Saputra (INA)	51.46
7	Mohammed Al-Marhoon (KSA)	52.76
8	Zandantulgyn Gereltulga (MGL)	55.39

==== 800 m ====
===== Round 1 =====
21 August

Rank	Athlete	Time
Heat 1
1	Chaowanon Rattanapan (THA)	1:57.51
2	Iman Talebi (IRI)	1:58.65
3	Bilal Bilano (INA)	1:59.12
4	Ahmad Al-Chor (LIB)	2:01.18
5	Alexandr Popov (KAZ)	2:02.33
6	Aikebaier Ainiwan (CHN)	2:03.75
Heat 2
1	Guled Nur (QAT)	2:04.04
2	Lee Sang-min (KOR)	2:04.06
3	Ata Asadi (IRI)	2:05.03
4	Tunukbek Almazbekov (KGZ)	2:06.83
5	Tsend-Ayuushiin Temüüjin (MGL)	2:15.45

===== Final =====
22 August

Rank	Athlete	Time
1st place, gold medalist(s)	Lee Sang-min (KOR)	1:54.64
2nd place, silver medalist(s)	Chaowanon Rattanapan (THA)	1:55.75
3rd place, bronze medalist(s)	Ata Asadi (IRI)	1:56.73
4	Iman Talebi (IRI)	1:56.95
5	Guled Nur (QAT)	1:58.08
6	Bilal Bilano (INA)	1:59.58
7	Ahmad Al-Chor (LIB)	2:02.50
8	Alexandr Popov (KAZ)	2:03.22

==== 1500 m ====
20 August

Rank	Athlete	Time
1st place, gold medalist(s)	Wang Wei (CHN)	4:03.75
2nd place, silver medalist(s)	Ata Asadi (IRI)	4:05.09
3rd place, bronze medalist(s)	Ajay Kumar Saroj (AOI)	4:05.76
4	Ali Al-Zabidi (YEM)	4:09.10
5	Ali Kaabi (KSA)	4:10.17
6	Nguyễn Tuấn Trị (VIE)	4:13.77
7	Muhamad Amirullah (INA)	4:14.76
8	Shohib Marican (SIN)	4:16.45
9	Keith Yong (SIN)	4:19.53
10	Iman Talebi (IRI)	4:24.68
11	Aray Serik (KAZ)	4:25.74
12	Teerawat Thabua (THA)	4:31.11
13	Ahmad Al-Chor (LIB)	4:31.27
14	Tsend-Ayuushiin Temüüjin (MGL)	4:31.69
15	Myagmarsürengiin Oyuunbat (MGL)	4:39.27
16	Abdullah Al-Qattan (KUW)	4:44.57
—	Ali Nassar (KUW)	DNF

==== 3000 m ====
22 August

Rank	Athlete	Time
1st place, gold medalist(s)	Liu Hongliang (CHN)	8:25.86
2nd place, silver medalist(s)	Chikashi Ikeda (JPN)	8:45.04
3rd place, bronze medalist(s)	Abhishek Pal (AOI)	8:45.72
4	Idriss Moussa Yousef (QAT)	8:53.74
5	Liu Qingshan (CHN)	9:20.01
6	Muhamad Amirullah (INA)	9:24.81
7	Nguyễn Tuấn Trị (VIE)	9:26.40
8	Aray Serik (KAZ)	10:01.68
9	Abdulwahab Maslamani (KSA)	11:47.00
10	Mutaz Majrashi (KSA)	11:47.05
—	Abdullah Al-Qattan (KUW)	DNF

==== 110 m hurdles ====
===== Round 1 =====
20 August

Rank	Athlete	Time
Heat 1
1	Takumu Furuya (JPN)	13.64
2	Parinya Munaek (THA)	14.31
3	Jay Choo (SIN)	14.61
4	Woo Seung-jae (KOR)	14.93
5	Vyacheslav Zems (KAZ)	14.94
6	Omar Al-Hadba (KUW)	15.29
Heat 2
1	Cheng Chi-hung (TPE)	14.25
2	Akila Ravisanka (SRI)	14.52
3	Abdulrahman Al-Dosari (QAT)	14.59
4	Yahya Sharahili (KSA)	14.83
5	Shi Yunlei (CHN)	14.90
6	Sajjad Hassanbeigi (IRI)	15.20
Heat 3
1	Rizzua Haizad (MAS)	14.42
2	Javad Shouryabi (IRI)	14.68
3	Jirayu Pawee (THA)	14.83
4	Yang Longcheng (CHN)	15.12
5	Abdulmohsen Al-Refaei (KUW)	15.20
6	Issa Al-Jassim (QAT)	15.48

===== Final =====
21 August

Rank	Athlete	Time
1st place, gold medalist(s)	Takumu Furuya (JPN)	13.36
2nd place, silver medalist(s)	Akila Ravisanka (SRI)	13.99
3rd place, bronze medalist(s)	Cheng Chi-hung (TPE)	14.06
4	Rizzua Haizad (MAS)	14.10
5	Parinya Munaek (THA)	14.43
6	Javad Shouryabi (IRI)	14.55
7	Jay Choo (SIN)	14.58
8	Abdulrahman Al-Dosari (QAT)	14.73

==== 400 m hurdles ====
===== Round 1 =====
21 August

Rank	Athlete	Time
Heat 1
1	Witthawat Thumcha (THA)	53.08
2	Anuradha Vidushanka (SRI)	54.65
3	Zhu Shijian (CHN)	55.99
4	Yesset Mizanov (KAZ)	57.29
5	Adnan Hakim Samri (SIN)	1:01.02
Heat 2
1	Javad Shouryabi (IRI)	55.01
2	Zhang Qunshan (CHN)	55.37
3	Taweep Sanboonruang (THA)	57.09
4	Omar Al-Hadba (KUW)	57.37
5	Jack Tan (SIN)	1:00.37
6	Soulasack Xaysa (LAO)	1:08.25

===== Final =====
22 August

Rank	Athlete	Time
1st place, gold medalist(s)	Witthawat Thumcha (THA)	52.79
2nd place, silver medalist(s)	Javad Shouryabi (IRI)	53.89
3rd place, bronze medalist(s)	Anuradha Vidushanka (SRI)	54.05
4	Zhang Qunshan (CHN)	54.59
5	Zhu Shijian (CHN)	55.57
6	Taweep Sanboonruang (THA)	55.74
7	Omar Al-Hadba (KUW)	57.18
8	Yesset Mizanov (KAZ)	57.48

==== 2000 m steeplechase ====
21 August

Rank	Athlete	Time
1st place, gold medalist(s)	Ma Hu (CHN)	5:53.16
2nd place, silver medalist(s)	Ainikeerjiang Aihemaiti (CHN)	6:00.31
3rd place, bronze medalist(s)	Mohammed Rageh (YEM)	6:18.38
4	Abdulhadi Al-Marri (QAT)	6:38.66
5	Ravi Rahman (INA)	6:45.81
6	Bader Al-Amrani (KSA)	6:58.54
7	Myagmarsürengiin Oyuunbat (MGL)	7:11.29
—	Ali Al-Otaibi (KUW)	DNF

==== High jump ====
22 August

Rank	Athlete	Result
1st place, gold medalist(s)	Yuji Hiramatsu (JPN)	2.06
2nd place, silver medalist(s)	Arian Zarekani (IRI)	2.03
3rd place, bronze medalist(s)	Norshafiee Shah (MAS)	2.00
4	Samuel Chan (SIN)	1.95
4	Ruslan Malinin (UZB)	1.95
6	Udantha Bandara (SRI)	1.90
7	Rashed Zaed (BRN)	1.90
8	Khalifa Matar (BRN)	1.85
9	Anurak Rangsri (THA)	1.85
10	Linn Htin (MYA)	1.80
11	Mohammed Al-Rashdi (OMA)	1.70
11	Mubarak Qambar (KUW)	1.70

==== Pole vault ====
19 August

Rank	Athlete	Result
1st place, gold medalist(s)	Hussain Al-Hizam (KSA)	4.70
2nd place, silver medalist(s)	Muntadher Faleh (IRQ)	4.60
3rd place, bronze medalist(s)	Afiq Ahmad Alham (MAS)	4.50
4	Lai Yanghui (CHN)	4.50
5	Park Jae-young (KOR)	4.20
—	Ali Mohsin (IRQ)	NM
—	Shi Faping (CHN)	NM

==== Long jump ====
19–20 August

Rank	Athlete	Qual.	Final
1st place, gold medalist(s)	Huang Chun-sheng (TPE)	7.09	7.23
2nd place, silver medalist(s)	Li Jie (CHN)	6.61	6.98
3rd place, bronze medalist(s)	Kim Hyun-jong (KOR)	6.85	6.98
4	Saran Saenbuakham (THA)	6.85	6.78
5	Maxim Issayev (KAZ)	6.68	6.77
6	Sadegh Mardani (IRI)	6.52	6.62
7	Sung Szu-hsien (TPE)	6.60	6.55
8	Shaun Moh (SIN)	6.50	6.53
9	Meisam Abdollahpour (IRI)	6.47	6.48
10	Gary Wee (SIN)	6.32	6.41
11	Mubarak Qambar (KUW)	6.52	6.38
—	Li Zhiyong (CHN)	6.85	NM
13	Aleksey Glazkov (UZB)	6.24	
14	Mohammed Al-Marhoon (KSA)	6.16	
15	Erdenebaataryn Shinetögs (MGL)	6.15	
16	Wan Ieng Kit (MAC)	5.96	
17	Ameen Subih (YEM)	5.76	
—	Chayanin Kaewweerasing (THA)	NM	
—	Abdulrahman Ahmed (QAT)	NM	
—	Aung Kyaw Htat (MYA)	DNS	

==== Triple jump ====
21 August

Rank	Athlete	Result
1st place, gold medalist(s)	Khathawut Meanim (THA)	15.11
2nd place, silver medalist(s)	Ivan Solovyev (KAZ)	14.86
3rd place, bronze medalist(s)	Gao Zhilin (CHN)	14.78
4	Chakkrit Panthasa (THA)	14.63
5	Li Weiming (CHN)	14.43
6	Veikko Samudra Nugraha (INA)	14.11
7	Afiq Hassan (SIN)	13.84
8	Abdulrahman Ahmed (QAT)	13.45
9	Erdenebaataryn Shinetögs (MGL)	12.98

==== Shot put ====
19 August

Rank	Athlete	Result
1st place, gold medalist(s)	Han Jianping (CHN)	18.87
2nd place, silver medalist(s)	Yume Ando (JPN)	18.07
3rd place, bronze medalist(s)	Huo Cheng (CHN)	17.00
4	Farkhod Suyunov (UZB)	16.00
5	Mehdi Rostami (IRI)	15.68
6	Hussain Al-Qattan (KUW)	15.32
7	Hussain Fatehallah (KUW)	14.63
8	Nitipon Petkong (THA)	14.20
9	Abel Leow (SIN)	12.44
10	Gerleegiin Enkhmend (MGL)	9.81
—	Malkeet Singh (AOI)	DNS
—	Ankit Tomar (AOI)	DNS

==== Discus throw ====
22 August

Rank	Athlete	Result
1st place, gold medalist(s)	Cheng Yulong (CHN)	62.03
2nd place, silver medalist(s)	Yume Ando (JPN)	53.50
3rd place, bronze medalist(s)	Shi Yang (CHN)	49.85
4	Mohammad Reza Tayyebi (IRI)	45.83
5	Amin Esmaeilizadeh (IRI)	45.37
6	Tontrakan Chuthueng (THA)	43.03
7	Abdulrazaq Al-Thuwaini (KUW)	40.02
8	Khalifa Al-Hinai (QAT)	33.29
—	Surat Kheysungnoen (THA)	NM

==== Hammer throw ====
20 August

Rank	Athlete	Result
1st place, gold medalist(s)	Ding Yuanbo (CHN)	73.73
2nd place, silver medalist(s)	Zoir Sheraliev (TJK)	62.44
3rd place, bronze medalist(s)	Hussein Thamer (IRQ)	62.11
4	Xing Zengqiang (CHN)	54.22
5	Sahib Mahdi (IRQ)	51.39
6	Hasan Al-Qalaf (KUW)	46.24
7	Ahmad Al-Rashid (KUW)	45.13

==== Javelin throw ====
19 August

Rank	Athlete	Result
1st place, gold medalist(s)	Tsai Jen-wei (TPE)	70.41
2nd place, silver medalist(s)	Su Zhuqing (CHN)	67.51
3rd place, bronze medalist(s)	Lee Sung-ming (TPE)	65.63
4	Zhou Ao (CHN)	64.94
5	Vladislav Palyunin (UZB)	57.25
6	Mohammad Esfandiari (IRI)	56.10
7	Vladislav Korostelev (UZB)	53.66
8	Sarayu Saphimai (THA)	52.07
9	Kim Woo-jung (KOR)	52.07
10	Ahmad Haidar (SYR)	48.69
11	Waleed Saeed (KUW)	43.72
—	Muhtadi Al-Ajami (KSA)	NM
—	Khalifa Al-Hinai (QAT)	NM
—	Salman Ahmad (KUW)	DNS

=== Girls ===
==== 100 m ====
===== Round 1 =====
19 August

Rank	Athlete	Time
Heat 1
1	Lee Pei-chen (TPE)	12.55
2	Kugapriya Chandran (SIN)	12.65
3	Lee Hyeon-hee (KOR)	12.85
4	Natalya Rasulova (UZB)	13.01
5	Wong Choi San (MAC)	13.78
6	Aishath Sara (MDV)	14.04
—	Dutee Chand (AOI)	DNS
Heat 2
1	Ge Manqi (CHN)	12.07
2	Parichat Charoensuk (THA)	12.40
3	Kyla Richardson (PHI)	12.42
4	Sri Wahyuni (INA)	12.99
5	Chan Ka Sin (HKG)	13.00
6	Zainab Sagher (BRN)	13.16
7	Dalal Al-Sulaibi (KUW)	15.51
Heat 3
1	Kayla Richardson (PHI)	12.27
2	Mazoon Al-Alawi (OMA)	12.63
3	Kong Chun Ki (HKG)	12.74
4	Aireen Akter (BAN)	12.76
5	Darya Ivanova (KAZ)	12.83
6	Phavina Radsombath (LAO)	14.85
7	Laila Al-Ashmori (YEM)	14.99
Heat 4
1	Song Min (CHN)	12.22
2	Kanchanaporn Sintaksab (THA)	12.40
3	Hu Chia-chen (TPE)	12.40
4	Sara Kawasaki (JPN)	12.69
5	Chanchala Dissanayake (SRI)	12.72
6	Mudhawi Al-Shammari (KUW)	13.11
7	Sara Al-Ghais (BRN)	14.31

===== Semifinals =====
20 August

Rank	Athlete	Time
Heat 1
1	Ge Manqi (CHN)	11.89
2	Parichat Charoensuk (THA)	12.12
3	Kyla Richardson (PHI)	12.28
4	Lee Pei-chen (TPE)	12.38
5	Kugapriya Chandran (SIN)	12.40
6	Lee Hyeon-hee (KOR)	12.63
7	Sara Kawasaki (JPN)	12.64
8	Darya Ivanova (KAZ)	12.79
Heat 2
1	Kayla Richardson (PHI)	12.21
2	Song Min (CHN)	12.30
3	Kanchanaporn Sintaksab (THA)	12.35
4	Hu Chia-chen (TPE)	12.49
5	Mazoon Al-Alawi (OMA)	12.61
6	Kong Chun Ki (HKG)	12.71
7	Chanchala Dissanayake (SRI)	12.72
8	Aireen Akter (BAN)	12.78

===== Final =====
20 August

Rank	Athlete	Time
1st place, gold medalist(s)	Ge Manqi (CHN)	11.91
2nd place, silver medalist(s)	Parichat Charoensuk (THA)	12.19
3rd place, bronze medalist(s)	Kanchanaporn Sintaksab (THA)	12.26
4	Song Min (CHN)	12.27
5	Kayla Richardson (PHI)	12.30
6	Kyla Richardson (PHI)	12.38
7	Kugapriya Chandran (SIN)	12.42
8	Lee Pei-chen (TPE)	12.43

==== 200 m ====
===== Round 1 =====
21 August

Rank	Athlete	Time
Heat 1
1	Yuna Otake (JPN)	24.82
2	Kanchanaporn Sintaksab (THA)	25.40
3	Lee Pei-chen (TPE)	25.93
4	Kong Chun Ki (HKG)	26.99
5	Al-Bandari Al-Mayyas (KUW)	28.60
6	Aishath Sara (MDV)	28.71
Heat 2
1	Huang Guifen (CHN)	24.09
2	Kayla Richardson (PHI)	25.54
3	Viktoriya Ryazantseva (KAZ)	26.11
4	Kseniia Prokopeva (KGZ)	26.63
5	Laila Alaa (SYR)	28.05
6	Sara Al-Ghais (BRN)	29.52
Heat 3
1	Wang Xuan (CHN)	24.08
2	Ulfa Silpiana (INA)	25.14
3	Valeriya Pak (UZB)	25.96
4	Arisara Dararut (THA)	26.17
5	Lee Hyeon-hee (KOR)	26.61
6	Wong Choi San (MAC)	27.80
Heat 4
1	Poon Hang Wai (HKG)	25.64
2	Kyla Richardson (PHI)	25.74
3	Lyubov Ushakova (KAZ)	26.00
4	Mudhawi Al-Shammari (KUW)	26.56
5	Aireen Akter (BAN)	26.85
6	Zainab Sagher (BRN)	26.93
7	Natalya Rasulova (UZB)	26.93

===== Semifinals =====
22 August

Rank	Athlete	Time
Heat 1
1	Huang Guifen (CHN)	24.21
2	Yuna Otake (JPN)	24.63
3	Kanchanaporn Sintaksab (THA)	25.54
4	Kayla Richardson (PHI)	26.13
5	Lyubov Ushakova (KAZ)	26.19
6	Valeriya Pak (UZB)	26.36
—	Lee Hyeon-hee (KOR)	DNS
—	Mudhawi Al-Shammari (KUW)	DNS
Heat 2
1	Wang Xuan (CHN)	24.75
2	Ulfa Silpiana (INA)	25.43
3	Arisara Dararut (THA)	25.86
4	Kyla Richardson (PHI)	25.86
5	Viktoriya Ryazantseva (KAZ)	25.88
6	Poon Hang Wai (HKG)	25.95
7	Lee Pei-chen (TPE)	25.95
8	Kseniia Prokopeva (KGZ)	27.14

===== Final =====
22 August

Rank	Athlete	Time
1st place, gold medalist(s)	Huang Guifen (CHN)	23.82
2nd place, silver medalist(s)	Wang Xuan (CHN)	24.35
3rd place, bronze medalist(s)	Yuna Otake (JPN)	24.41
4	Ulfa Silpiana (INA)	25.18
5	Kyla Richardson (PHI)	25.73
6	Arisara Dararut (THA)	25.76
7	Viktoriya Ryazantseva (KAZ)	25.91
8	Kanchanaporn Sintaksab (THA)	26.08

==== 400 m ====
===== Round 1 =====
19 August

Rank	Athlete	Time
Heat 1
1	Huang Guifen (CHN)	55.39
2	Lin Yu-chieh (TPE)	57.20
3	Kseniia Prokopeva (KGZ)	59.03
4	Poon Hang Wai (HKG)	59.62
5	Al-Zahraa Abdul-Razzaq (IRQ)	1:05.56
6	Al-Bandari Al-Mayyas (KUW)	1:10.25
—	G. K. Vijayakumari (AOI)	DNS
Heat 2
1	Nirmali Madushika (SRI)	56.62
2	Thanphimon Kaeodi (THA)	57.13
3	Pan Pei-yu (TPE)	57.32
4	Sureewan Runan (THA)	58.23
5	Valeriya Pak (UZB)	59.44
6	Ganbatyn Khulan (MGL)	1:07.83

===== Final =====
20 August

Rank	Athlete	Time
1st place, gold medalist(s)	Huang Guifen (CHN)	53.65
2nd place, silver medalist(s)	Lin Yu-chieh (TPE)	55.78
3rd place, bronze medalist(s)	Nirmali Madushika (SRI)	55.96
4	Thanphimon Kaeodi (THA)	56.00
5	Sureewan Runan (THA)	56.85
6	Pan Pei-yu (TPE)	57.55
7	Kseniia Prokopeva (KGZ)	59.23
8	Valeriya Pak (UZB)	1:00.06

==== 800 m ====
===== Round 1 =====
21 August

Rank	Athlete	Time
Heat 1
1	Mehrangez Nazarova (TJK)	2:19.39
2	Phùng Thị Thu (VIE)	2:19.93
3	Sara-Joe Kortbawi (LIB)	2:21.30
4	Liu Chang (CHN)	2:23.82
5	Carys Hor (SIN)	2:27.00
—	Al-Zahraa Abdul-Razzaq (IRQ)	DNS
Heat 2
1	Savinder Kaur (MAS)	2:18.40
2	Pi Năng Thị Bạc (VIE)	2:18.71
3	Aprilia Kartina (INA)	2:20.26
4	Chou Wen-ping (TPE)	2:24.57
5	Chan Hiu Yan (HKG)	2:30.92
6	Bayarmaagiin Khaliun (MGL)	2:39.30
Heat 3
1	Anjana Thamke (AOI)	2:13.21
2	Dilhani Fernando (SRI)	2:14.16
3	Varvara Lissichkina (KAZ)	2:18.34
4	Pan Pei-yu (TPE)	2:18.52
5	Latdawan Daengsuwan (THA)	2:22.48
6	Park Young-sun (KOR)	2:28.37

===== Final =====
22 August

Rank	Athlete	Time
1st place, gold medalist(s)	Anjana Thamke (AOI)	2:11.47
2nd place, silver medalist(s)	Savinder Kaur (MAS)	2:14.14
3rd place, bronze medalist(s)	Dilhani Fernando (SRI)	2:15.72
4	Varvara Lissichkina (KAZ)	2:17.43
5	Phùng Thị Thu (VIE)	2:18.87
6	Pan Pei-yu (TPE)	2:19.13
7	Pi Năng Thị Bạc (VIE)	2:20.21
8	Mehrangez Nazarova (TJK)	2:20.25

==== 1500 m ====
20 August

Rank	Athlete	Time
1st place, gold medalist(s)	Zhao Guoyu (CHN)	4:35.06
2nd place, silver medalist(s)	Aprilia Kartina (INA)	4:36.65
3rd place, bronze medalist(s)	Park Young-sun (KOR)	4:38.97
4	Qu Wenwen (CHN)	4:41.04
5	Mehrangez Nazarova (TJK)	4:45.63
6	Nguyễn Ngọc Ánh (VIE)	4:52.17
7	Odina Khomidova (UZB)	4:52.18
8	Sara-Joe Kortbawi (LIB)	4:52.67
9	Eliza Temirbek Kyzy (KGZ)	5:00.69
10	Enkhbayaryn Ariuntungalag (MGL)	5:02.52
11	Dilhani Fernando (SRI)	5:04.17
12	Sangita Khadka (NEP)	5:04.96
13	Latdawan Daengsuwan (THA)	5:11.20
14	Oktyabryn Azzayaa (MGL)	5:19.29
15	Ranin Dwedar (PLE)	5:54.12
16	Arwa Sharafaddin (YEM)	6:12.46
—	Fatima Raya (SYR)	DNF

==== 3000 m ====
22 August

Rank	Athlete	Time
1st place, gold medalist(s)	Fukiko Ando (JPN)	9:23.50
2nd place, silver medalist(s)	Ju Ok-byol (PRK)	9:51.78
3rd place, bronze medalist(s)	Paek Hyong-yong (PRK)	9:55.08
4	Trần Thị Thẩm (VIE)	10:26.17
5	Zheng Le (CHN)	10:26.21
6	Nguyễn Ngọc Ánh (VIE)	10:36.30
7	Odina Khomidova (UZB)	10:48.05
8	Xu Sijia (CHN)	10:59.30
9	Sangita Khadka (NEP)	11:03.09
10	Lada Fomina (KAZ)	11:14.13
11	Yulianti Utari (INA)	11:28.05

==== 100 m hurdles ====
===== Round 1 =====
20 August

Rank	Athlete	Time
Heat 1
1	Nguyễn Thị Lan (VIE)	14.41
2	Ankita Sunil Gosavi (AOI)	14.60
3	Song Yu-jin (KOR)	14.95
4	Chen Yu-hsuan (TPE)	15.04
5	Kerstin Ong (SIN)	15.36
6	Zhang Jie (CHN)	16.40
Heat 2
1	Nana Fujimori (JPN)	13.82
2	Ken Ayuthaya Purnama (INA)	14.64
3	Yang Jie (CHN)	14.69
4	Lin Shu-fen (TPE)	14.89
5	Nur Izlyn Zaini (SIN)	15.17
6	Loi Im Lan (MAC)	20.84

===== Final =====
21 August

Rank	Athlete	Time
1st place, gold medalist(s)	Nana Fujimori (JPN)	13.69
2nd place, silver medalist(s)	Nguyễn Thị Lan (VIE)	14.43
3rd place, bronze medalist(s)	Ken Ayuthaya Purnama (INA)	14.45
4	Chen Yu-hsuan (TPE)	14.51
5	Yang Jie (CHN)	14.53
6	Song Yu-jin (KOR)	14.64
7	Lin Shu-fen (TPE)	14.69
—	Ankita Sunil Gosavi (AOI)	DSQ

==== 400 m hurdles ====
22 August

Rank	Athlete	Time
1st place, gold medalist(s)	Yu Ying (CHN)	1:03.28
2nd place, silver medalist(s)	Anastassiya Sergeyeva (KAZ)	1:03.87
3rd place, bronze medalist(s)	Jong Kyong-suk (PRK)	1:05.00
4	Lin Yu-chieh (TPE)	1:05.85
5	Sharlene Teo (SIN)	1:10.77

==== 2000 m steeplechase ====
21 August

Rank	Athlete	Time
1st place, gold medalist(s)	Fatima Raya (SYR)	7:07.82
2nd place, silver medalist(s)	Trần Thị Mai (VIE)	7:29.34
3rd place, bronze medalist(s)	Enkhbayaryn Ariuntungalag (MGL)	7:35.50
4	Shao Dan (CHN)	7:41.92
5	Wuniqimu Maimaiti (CHN)	7:59.78
6	Tria Ningsih (INA)	8:10.43
7	Ögöömöriin Oyuundari (MGL)	9:06.75

==== High jump ====
19 August

Rank	Athlete	Result
1st place, gold medalist(s)	Guan Luwei (CHN)	1.65
2nd place, silver medalist(s)	Chai Yanbo (CHN)	1.60
3rd place, bronze medalist(s)	Krobkaew Taemsri (THA)	1.60
4	Kim Eun-jeong (KOR)	1.55
4	Viktoriya Ryazantseva (KAZ)	1.55
6	Safina Sadullayeva (UZB)	1.55

==== Pole vault ====
20 August

Rank	Athlete	Result
1st place, gold medalist(s)	Li Chaoqun (CHN)	4.00
2nd place, silver medalist(s)	Yang Shuting (CHN)	3.55
3rd place, bronze medalist(s)	Lin Tsai-ying (TPE)	3.55
4	Jelita Rara (INA)	3.50
5	Chang An Zi (SIN)	3.10
6	Emily Obiena (PHI)	3.10
7	Anna Danilovskaya (KAZ)	3.00
—	Zahraa Jamal (IRQ)	NM
—	Shen Yi-ju (TPE)	NM

==== Long jump ====
20–21 August

Rank	Athlete	Qual.	Final
1st place, gold medalist(s)	Nguyễn Thị Trúc Mai (VIE)	5.68	5.90
2nd place, silver medalist(s)	Hong Jingwen (CHN)	5.49	5.78
3rd place, bronze medalist(s)	Parinya Chuaimaroeng (THA)	5.64	5.61
4	Wen Wan-ju (TPE)	5.52	5.60
5	Honoka Amagi (JPN)	5.54	5.55
6	Liao Rui (CHN)	5.30	5.51
7	Huang Shih-han (TPE)	5.56	5.49
8	Akshaya Sona (AOI)	5.45	5.48
9	Viktoriya Dirdina (UZB)	5.44	5.38
10	Lee Hyeon-jeong (KOR)	5.33	5.11
11	Kumuduli Wijesiriwardane (SRI)	5.32	5.08
12	Cao Mai Nhân (VIE)	5.28	5.08
13	Mary Anthony Diesto (PHI)	5.24	
14	Oksana Molchanova (UZB)	5.19	
15	Kirthana Ramasamy (MAS)	5.05	
16	Wong Pui Ling (HKG)	4.96	
17	Mazoon Al-Alawi (OMA)	4.82	
18	Qistina Raja Afiqah (SIN)	4.69	
19	Zahra Ayoubifard (IRI)	4.65	
20	Anissa Sharmaine (SIN)	4.60	
21	Shahad Qasim (IRQ)	4.36	
22	Danah Al-Tamimi (BRN)	4.09	
23	Shahed Al-Khashty (KUW)	3.92	

==== Triple jump ====
22 August

Rank	Athlete	Result
1st place, gold medalist(s)	Ma Yue (CHN)	12.55
2nd place, silver medalist(s)	Rochelle Macfarlane (AOI)	12.38
3rd place, bronze medalist(s)	Lee Hyeon-jeong (KOR)	12.28
4	Kirthana Ramasamy (MAS)	12.23
5	Anna Gorodkova (KAZ)	11.96
6	Viktoriya Dirdina (UZB)	11.87
7	Nguyễn Thị Trúc Mai (VIE)	11.70
8	Oksana Molchanova (UZB)	11.52
9	Chang Yu-chin (TPE)	11.50
10	Hong Hye-jong (PRK)	11.48
11	Cao Mai Nhân (VIE)	11.26
12	Mary Anthony Diesto (PHI)	10.96
13	Shahad Qasim (IRQ)	10.83
14	Celine Chay (SIN)	10.80
15	Anissa Sharmaine (SIN)	10.38

==== Shot put ====
21 August

Rank	Athlete	Result
1st place, gold medalist(s)	Dong Yu (CHN)	16.84
2nd place, silver medalist(s)	Jeong Yu-sun (KOR)	15.26
3rd place, bronze medalist(s)	Jiao Yaping (CHN)	14.95
4	Meghana Devanga (AOI)	14.51
5	Chin Poh Kuan (MAS)	13.27
6	Chen Chueh-yi (TPE)	13.22
7	Kliawphan Duangyai (THA)	13.14
8	Chang Chu (TPE)	12.96
9	Kek Jing Wen (SIN)	11.69
10	Nattawee Hantamley (THA)	11.19
11	Lau Yen June (SIN)	11.04
12	Fatemeh Izadi (IRI)	10.93
13	Noura Al-Ajmi (KUW)	9.34
14	Fatemeh Taghavi (IRI)	9.13

==== Discus throw ====
22 August

Rank	Athlete	Result
1st place, gold medalist(s)	Sun Kangping (CHN)	49.28
2nd place, silver medalist(s)	Zhang Wenjun (CHN)	44.87
3rd place, bronze medalist(s)	Pimpisa Songnoo (THA)	36.37
4	Chin Poh Kuan (MAS)	35.82
5	Chen Chueh-yi (TPE)	35.34

==== Hammer throw ====
20 August

Rank	Athlete	Result
1st place, gold medalist(s)	Mingkamon Koomphon (THA)	59.58
2nd place, silver medalist(s)	Jiang Mingzhu (CHN)	56.33
3rd place, bronze medalist(s)	Zhang Chenyu (CHN)	51.73
4	Gulrukhsora Khoshimova (UZB)	48.63
5	Anastassiya Saromatina (KAZ)	44.31
6	Laxay Sharma (AOI)	43.81
7	Bashayer Al-Quraishi (QAT)	43.19
8	Shahad Al-Bader (KUW)	31.36

==== Javelin throw ====
21 August

Rank	Athlete	Result
1st place, gold medalist(s)	Kang Young-in (KOR)	54.31
2nd place, silver medalist(s)	Chang Wan-chi (TPE)	47.75
3rd place, bronze medalist(s)	Lee Yi-hua (TPE)	46.40
4	Pushpa Jakhar (AOI)	45.64
5	Varvara Nazarova (KAZ)	44.47
6	Chen Li (CHN)	43.83
7	Anastasiya Volkova (UZB)	39.45
8	Anna Volkova (UZB)	39.28
9	Sara Al-Mannai (QAT)	33.45
