= 2009 European Athletics U23 Championships – Women's 4 × 100 metres relay =

The women's 4 x 100 metres relay event at the 2009 European Athletics U23 Championships was held in Kaunas, Lithuania, at S. Dariaus ir S. Girėno stadionas (Darius and Girėnas Stadium) on 19 July.

== Medalists ==
Gold	Annabelle Lewis; Joey Duck; Lucy Sargent; Elaine O'Neill; United Kingdom
Silver	Agnieszka Ceglarek; Marika Popowicz; Ewelina Ptak; Weronika Wedler; Milena Pędziwiatr^{*} Poland
Bronze	Silvija Peseckaitė; Lina Andrijauskaitė; Sonata Tamošaitytė; Lina Grinčikaitė; Lithuania

^{*}: Competed in heat.

== Results ==
=== Final ===
19 July

Rank	Nation	Competitors	Time	Notes
1st place, gold medalist(s)	United Kingdom	Annabelle Lewis; Joey Duck; Lucy Sargent; Elaine O'Neill	43.89	
2nd place, silver medalist(s)	Poland	Agnieszka Ceglarek; Marika Popowicz; Ewelina Ptak; Weronika Wedler	43.90	
3rd place, bronze medalist(s)	Lithuania	Silvija Peseckaitė; Lina Andrijauskaitė; Sonata Tamošaitytė; Lina Grinčikaitė	44.09	
4	France	Wendy Pascal; Lucienne M'belu; Émilie Gaydu; Céline Distel	44.26	
5	Russia	Yekaterina Filatova; Aleksandra Fedoriva; Yelizaveta Savlinis; Marina Panteleyeva	44.28	
6	Belarus	Alina Talay; Katsiaryna Hanchar; Katsiaryna Shumak; Alena Kievich	44.86	
7	Italy	Ilenia Draisci; Martina Balboni; Michaela D'Angelo; Audrey Alloh	45.40	
8	Ukraine	Nataliya Pohrebnyak; Hrystyna Stuy; Mariya Ryemyen; Viktoriya Pyatachenko	54.69	

=== Heats ===
19 July
Qualified: first 3 in each heat and 2 best to the Final

==== Heat 1 ====
Rank	Nation	Competitors	Time	Notes
1	Ukraine	Nataliya Pohrebnyak; Hrystyna Stuy; Mariya Ryemyen; Viktoriya Pyatachenko	44.21	Q
2	United Kingdom	Annabelle Lewis; Joey Duck; Lucy Sargent; Elaine O'Neill	44.37	Q
3	Russia	Yekaterina Filatova; Aleksandra Fedoriva; Yelizaveta Savlinis; Marina Panteleyeva	44.38	Q
4	Spain	Ana Torrijos; Estela García; Amparo María Cotán; Silvia Riba	45.18	
5	Netherlands	Kadene Vassell; Esther Akihary; Nikki van Leeuwen; Tamara Klomp	45.61	

==== Heat 2 ====
Rank	Nation	Competitors	Time	Notes
1	Lithuania	Silvija Peseckaitė; Lina Andrijauskaitė; Sonata Tamošaitytė; Lina Grinčikaitė	44.04	Q
2	Belarus	Alina Talay; Katsiaryna Hanchar; Katsiaryna Shumak; Alena Kievich	44.32	Q
3	Poland	Agnieszka Ceglarek; Marika Popowicz; Milena Pędziwiatr; Weronika Wedler	44.76	Q
4	France	Wendy Pascal; Lucienne M'belu; Émilie Gaydu; Céline Distel	44.88	q
5	Italy	Ilenia Draisci; Martina Balboni; Michaela D'Angelo; Audrey Alloh	45.11	q
	Czech Republic	Monika Táborská; Jana Branišová; Zlata Polonyová; Kateřina Čechová	DNF	

== Participation ==
According to an unofficial count, 45 athletes from 11 countries participated in the event.

- Belarus (4)
- Czech Republic (4)
- France (4)
- Italy (4)
- Lithuania (4)
- Netherlands (4)
- Poland (5)
- Russia (4)
- Spain (4)
- Ukraine (4)
- United Kingdom (4)
