= Agnieszka Ceglarek =

Polish sprinter

Personal information
- Nationality: Poland
- Born: 3 May 1988 (age 38) Poznań, Poland

Sport
- Sport: Athletics
Medal record
Woman's athletics
Representing Poland
European Athletics U23 Championships
Silver medal – second place	2009 Kaunas	4 × 100 m relay
European Junior Championships
Gold medal – first place	2005 Kaunas	4 × 100 m relay
Bronze medal – third place	2007 Hengelo	4 × 100 m relay

Agnieszka Ceglarek (born 3 May 1988 in Poznań, Poland) is a Polish track and field athlete and sprinter.

As a competitor for Olimpia Poznań, Ceglarek won the gold medal in the 2005 European Athletics Junior Championships in Kaunas in 2005, where the Polish 4 × 100 m relay team consisting of Agnieszka Ceglarek, Marika Popowicz, Marta Jeschke, and Iwona Brzezińska took first place. She also won the bronze medal in the 2007 European Athletics Junior Championships in Hengelo in 2007, where the Polish 4 × 100 m relay team of Martyna Książek, Marika Popowicz, Agnieszka Ceglarek, and Weronika Wedler took third place. Ceglarek is also the runner up for the 4 × 100 m relay in the 2009 European Athletics U23 Championships in Kaunas in 2009, where the Polish team of Agnieszka Ceglarek, Marika Popowicz, Ewelina Ptak, and Weronika Wedler took second place with a time of 43.90 s.

== Personal bests ==
- 100 metres - 11.69 (2007)
- 200 metres - 23.99 (2007)
- 60 metres (indoors) - 7.60 (2005)
