= Track and field at the 2015 Military World Games – Women's 100 metres =

The women's 100 metres event at the 2015 Military World Games was held on 6 October at the KAFAC Sports Complex.

== Records ==
Prior to this competition, the existing world and CISM record were as follows:

World Record	Florence Griffith Joyner (USA)	10.49	Indianapolis, United States	16 July 1988
CISM World Record	Ana Cláudia Silva (BRA)	11.28	Rio de Janeiro, Brazil	21 July 2011

== Schedule ==
Date	Time	Round
6 October 2015	11:30	Round 1
6 October 2015	17:00	Final

== Medalists ==
Gold	Silver	Bronze
Rosângela Santos; Brazil	Nataliya Pohrebnyak; Ukraine	Marika Popowicz-Drapała; Poland

== Results ==
=== Round 1 ===
Qualification: First 3 in each heat (Q) and next 2 fastest (q) qualified for the final.

Wind:
Heat 1: -1.1 m/s, Heat 2: -0.3 m/s

Rank	Heat	Name	Nationality	Time	Notes
1	1	Rosângela Santos	Brazil	11.47	Q
2	2	Nataliya Pohrebnyak	Ukraine	11.61	Q
3	2	Marika Popowicz-Drapała	Poland	11.66	Q
4	2	Franciela Krasucki	Brazil	11.76	Q
5	1	Iman Essa	Bahrain	11.84	Q
6	1	Olesya Povh	Ukraine	11.86	Q
7	1	Weronika Wedler	Poland	11.87	q
8	2	Hongguang Yang	China	11.90	q
9	2	Fitria Indah Wahyuni	Indonesia	12.16	
10	1	Zeru Xie	China	12.24	
11	1	Chamali Dilrukshi Nawanage	Sri Lanka	12.28	
12	2	Sabina Mukoswa	Kenya	12.41	
13	1	Margarita Manzueta	Dominican Republic	12.55	
14	2	LaTisha Moulds	United States	12.73	
15	2	Alina Talay	Belarus	12.75	
	1	Andriana Ferra	Greece	DQ	R162.7

=== Final ===
Wind: +1.6 m/s

Rank	Lane	Name	Nationality	Time	Notes
1st place, gold medalist(s)	3	Rosângela Santos	Brazil	11.17	CR
2nd place, silver medalist(s)	4	Nataliya Pohrebnyak	Ukraine	11.46	
3rd place, bronze medalist(s)	5	Marika Popowicz-Drapała	Poland	11.50	
4	8	Olesya Povh	Ukraine	11.61	
5	2	Weronika Wedler	Poland	11.63	
6	6	Iman Essa	Bahrain	11.68	
7	1	Hongguang Yang	China	11.87	
8	7	Franciela Krasucki	Brazil	11.92	
