= Track and field at the 2015 Military World Games – Women's 4 × 100 metres relay =

The women's 4 × 100 metres relay event at the 2015 Military World Games was held on 8 October at the KAFAC Sports Complex.

== Records ==
Prior to this competition, the existing world and CISM record were as follows:

World Record	United States (Tianna Madison, Allyson Felix, Bianca Knight, Carmelita Jeter)	40.82	London, Great Britain	10 August 2012
CISM World Record	Brazil (Geisa Coutinho, Vanda Gomes, Ana Cláudia Silva, Franciela Krasucki)	43.73	Rio de Janeiro, Brazil	23 July 2011

== Schedule ==
Date	Time	Round
8 October 2015	16:35	Final

== Medalists ==
Gold	Silver	Bronze
Brazil; Aline Torres Sena; Vitória Cristina Rosa; Franciela Krasucki; Rosângela Santos	Russia; Ekaterina Galitskaia; Nadezhda Kotlyarova; Ekaterina Renzhina; Nina Morozova	China; Xie Zeru; Wang Xuan; Yang Hongguang; Huang Guifen

== Results ==
=== Final ===
Rank	Lane	Nation	Name	Time	Notes
1st place, gold medalist(s)	7	Brazil	Aline Torres Sena, Vitória Cristina Rosa, Franciela Krasucki, Rosângela Santos	43.87	
2nd place, silver medalist(s)	2	Russia	Ekaterina Galitskaia, Nadezhda Kotlyarova, Ekaterina Renzhina, Nina Morozova	44.20	
3rd place, bronze medalist(s)	6	China	Xie Zeru, Wang Xuan, Yang Hongguang, Huang Guifen	45.05	
4	3	Ukraine	Nataliya Pohrebnyak, Olesya Povh, Hanna Platitsyna, Yelyzaveta Bryzhina	45.16	
5	4	Sri Lanka	Chandrika Rasnayake, Chamali Dilrukshi Nawanage, Abarana Gedara W. M. Karunathilaka, Geethani P. Belgoda Dewayalage	47.37	
6	5	Kenya	Musiko Cathrine Nandi, Sabina Mukoswa, Priscilla Nasimiyu, Rose Cherono Sang	47.65	
	8	Poland	Marta Jeschke, Anna Kiełbasińska, Weronika Wedler, Marika Popowicz-Drapała	DNF	
