= Track and field at the 2015 Military World Games – Women's 4 × 400 metres relay =

The women's 4 × 400 metres relay event at the 2015 Military World Games was held on 6 October at the KAFAC Sports Complex.

== Records ==
Prior to this competition, the existing world and CISM record were as follows:

World Record	Soviet Union (Tatyana Ledovskaya, Olga Nazarova, Mariya Pinigina, Olga Bryzgina)	3:15.17	Seoul, South Korea	1 October 1988
CISM World Record	Brazil (Vanda Gomes, Christiane dos Santos, Geisa Coutinho, Jailma de Lima)	3:32.42	Rio de Janeiro, Brazil	21 July 2011

== Schedule ==
Date	Time	Round
6 October 2015	17:25	Final

== Medalists ==
Gold	Silver	Bronze
Russia; Ekaterina Renzhina; Nadezhda Kotlyarova; Kseniya Ryzhova; Antonina Krivoshapka	Ukraine; Olha Zemlyak; Nataliia Pygyda; Hanna Ryzhykova; Nataliia Lupu	Bahrain; Salwa Eid Naser; Edidiong Odiong; Iman Essa; Oluwakemi Adekoya

== Results ==
=== Final ===
Rank	Lane	Nation	Name	Time	Notes
1st place, gold medalist(s)	6	Russia	Ekaterina Renzhina, Nadezhda Kotlyarova, Kseniya Ryzhova, Antonina Krivoshapka	3:28.75	CR
2nd place, silver medalist(s)	5	Ukraine	Olha Zemlyak, Nataliia Pygyda, Hanna Ryzhykova, Nataliia Lupu	3:30.66	
3rd place, bronze medalist(s)	8	Bahrain	Salwa Eid Naser, Edidiong Odiong, Iman Essa, Oluwakemi Adekoya	3:32.62	
4	1	Poland	Ewelina Ptak, Angelika Cichocka, Marta Jeschke, Anna Kiełbasińska	3:35.37	
5	7	China	Yao Xuejing, Xie Zeru, Zhang Xuefei, Huang Guifen	3:42.09	
6	4	Kenya	Priscilla Tabunda, Sabina Mukoswa, Rose Cherono Sang, Musiko Cathrine Nandi	3:46.98	
	3	Sri Lanka	Abarana Gedara W. M. Karunathilaka, Nimal Waliwarsha, Geethani P. Belgoda Dewayalage, Chandrika Rasnayake	DQ	R170.7
	2	United States		DNS	
