= 2012 IAAF World Indoor Championships – Women's 60 metres =

The women's 60 metres at the 2012 IAAF World Indoor Championships was held at the Ataköy Athletics Arena on 10 and 11 March.

== Medalists ==
Gold	Silver	Bronze
Veronica Campbell-Brown; Jamaica	Murielle Ahouré; Ivory Coast	Tianna Madison; United States

== Records ==
Standing records prior to the 2012 IAAF World Indoor Championships
World record	Irina Privalova (RUS)	6.92	Madrid, Spain	11 February 1993
World record	Irina Privalova (RUS)	6.92	Madrid, Spain	9 February 1995
Championship record	Gail Devers (USA)	6.95	Toronto, Canada	12 March 1993
World Leading	Tianna Madison (USA)	7.02	Fayetteville, United States	11 February 2012
African record	Christy Opara-Thompson (NGR)	7.02	Ghent, Belgium	12 February 1997
African record	Chioma Ajunwa (NGR)	7.02	Liévin, France	22 February 1998
Asian record	Susanthika Jayasinghe (SRI)	7.09	Stuttgart, Germany	17 February 1999
European record	Irina Privalova (RUS)	6.92	Madrid, Spain	11 February 1993
European record	Irina Privalova (RUS)	6.92	Madrid, Spain	9 February 1995
North and Central American and Caribbean record	Gail Devers (USA)	6.95	Toronto, Canada	12 March 1993
North and Central American and Caribbean record	Marion Jones (USA)	6.95	Maebashi, Japan	7 March 1998
Oceanian Record	Sally McLellan (AUS)	7.30	Boston, United States	7 February 2009
South American record	Esmeralda de Jesus Garcia (BRA)	7.26	Pocatello, United States	13 March 1981

== Qualification standards ==
Indoor	Outdoor
7.35	11.25 (100 m)

== Schedule ==
Date	Time	Round
March 10, 2012	10:10	Heats
March 11, 2012	14:15	Semifinals
March 11, 2012	17:05	Final

== Results ==
=== Heats ===
Qualification: first 2 of each heat (Q) plus the fastest 8 times (q) qualified.

Rank	Heat	Name	Nationality	Time	Notes
1	2	Gloria Asumnu	Nigeria	7.19	Q
1	4	Ivet Lalova	Bulgaria	7.19	Q
3	6	LaVerne Jones-Ferrette	U.S. Virgin Islands	7.21	Q
4	5	Murielle Ahouré	Côte d'Ivoire	7.23	Q
4	8	Chandra Sturrup	Bahamas	7.23	Q, SB
6	3	Barbara Pierre	United States	7.24	Q
6	8	Tianna Madison	United States	7.24	Q
8	4	Dafne Schippers	Netherlands	7.28	Q
9	2	Chisato Fukushima	Japan	7.29	Q, NR
9	7	Veronica Campbell-Brown	Jamaica	7.29	Q
11	5	Yuliya Balykina	Belarus	7.31	Q
12	2	Yulia Nestsiarenka	Belarus	7.33	q
12	1	Audrey Alloh	Italy	7.33	Q, PB
14	1	Aleen Bailey	Jamaica	7.34	Q
15	3	Vida Anim	Ghana	7.35	Q
DQ	6	Inna Eftimova	Bulgaria	~~7.35~~	Q, Doping
15	7	Wei Yongli	China	7.35	Q
17	1	Asha Philip	Great Britain	7.37	q
17	4	Lina Grinčikaitė	Lithuania	7.37	q
19	7	Guzel Khubbieva	Uzbekistan	7.39	q
20	3	Kateřina Čechová	Czech Republic	7.40	q
20	6	Ana Claudia Silva	Brazil	7.40	q, PB
20	8	Jodie Williams	Great Britain	7.40	q
23	5	Viktorya Pyatachenko	Ukraine	7.43	q
24	5	Tao Yujia	China	7.44	
25	1	Sónia Tavares	Portugal	7.45	
25	2	Olga Bludova	Kazakhstan	7.45	
27	3	Delphine Atangana	Cameroon	7.47	
27	6	Jamile Samuel	Netherlands	7.47	
29	2	Feta Ahamada	Comoros	7.49	
29	7	Ekaterina Filatova	Russia	7.49	
31	4	Viktoriya Zyabkina	Kazakhstan	7.55	
32	6	Anasztázia Nguyen	Hungary	7.59	
33	4	Globine Mayova	Namibia	7.64	NR
34	3	Fong Yee Pui	Hong Kong	7.67	
35	5	Rebecca Camilleri	Malta	7.68	PB
35	8	Liao Ching-hsien	Chinese Taipei	7.68	
37	2	Yelena Ryabova	Turkmenistan	7.76	
37	8	Karene King	British Virgin Islands	7.76	
39	5	Dana Abdul Razak	Iraq	7.78	SB
40	6	Martina Pretelli	San Marino	7.79	
41	5	Mary Jane Vincent	Mauritius	7.84	NR
42	4	Niafatul Aini	Indonesia	7.92	
43	7	Hrafnhild Hermódsdóttir	Iceland	7.97	
44	2	Shinelle Proctor	Anguilla	8.01	PB
44	8	Mariette Mien	Burkina Faso	8.01	PB
46	4	Lovelite Detenamo	Nauru	8.04	NR
47	3	Patricia Taea	Cook Islands	8.06	NR
48	8	Hinikissia Albertine Ndikert	Chad	8.13	PB
49	1	Papia Rani Sarkar	Bangladesh	8.17	
50	1	Anna Bulanova	Kyrgyzstan	8.19	
50	8	Chauzje Choosha	Zambia	8.19	NR
52	1	Maria Inaly Morazán	Nicaragua	8.29	PB
53	1	Rachel Abrams	Northern Mariana Islands	8.31	PB
54	4	Anna Sirvent	Andorra	8.37	
55	3	Belinda Talakai	Tonga	8.45	PB
56	7	Terani Faremiro	French Polynesia	8.46	PB
57	2	Pauline Kwalea	Solomon Islands	8.48	PB
58	5	Colleen Gibbons	Palau	8.88	PB
59	6	Daphne Nalawas	Vanuatu	9.06	PB
60	7	Tio Elita	Kiribati	9.14	PB
61	7	Tahmina Kohistani	Afghanistan	9.32	
	3	Wangchuk Tashi Eden	Bhutan	DNS	
	6	Elysa Ndaya Kabeya	Democratic Republic of the Congo	DNS	

=== Semifinals ===
Qualification: first 2 of each heat (Q) plus the fastest 2 times (q) qualified.

Rank	Heat	Name	Nationality	Time	Notes
1	1	Veronica Campbell-Brown	Jamaica	7.12	Q
2	2	Murielle Ahouré	Côte d'Ivoire	7.13	Q
3	2	Tianna Madison	United States	7.17	Q
4	1	Barbara Pierre	United States	7.19	Q
5	1	Gloria Asumnu	Nigeria	7.20	q
6	3	Chandra Sturrup	Bahamas	7.21	Q, SB
7	3	Ivet Lalova	Bulgaria	7.23	Q
8	3	Aleen Bailey	Jamaica	7.23	q
9	1	Asha Philip	Great Britain	7.24	
10	2	Dafne Schippers	Netherlands	7.25	
10	3	Guzel Khubbieva	Uzbekistan	7.25	SB
12	1	Lina Grinčikaitė	Lithuania	7.26	PB
13	1	Yuliya Balykina	Belarus	7.28	
14	2	Kateřina Čechová	Czech Republic	7.31	
14	3	Yulia Nestsiarenka	Belarus	7.31	
16	3	Jodie Williams	Great Britain	7.32	
17	2	Wei Yongli	China	7.35	SB
18	1	Vida Anim	Ghana	7.36	
18	2	Ana Claudia Silva	Brazil	7.36	PB
20	3	Audrey Alloh	Italy	7.38	
21	1	Viktorya Pyatachenko	Ukraine	7.41	
DQ	2	Inna Eftimova	Bulgaria	~~7.44~~	Doping
	2	LaVerne Jones-Ferrette	U.S. Virgin Islands	DSQ	
	3	Chisato Fukushima	Japan	DNS	

=== Final ===
The Final start in 17.06

Rank	Lane	Name	Nationality	Time	Notes
1st place, gold medalist(s)	4	Veronica Campbell-Brown	Jamaica	7.01	WL
2nd place, silver medalist(s)	5	Murielle Ahouré	Côte d'Ivoire	7.04	NR
3rd place, bronze medalist(s)	3	Tianna Madison	United States	7.09	
4	7	Barbara Pierre	United States	7.14	
5	6	Chandra Sturrup	Bahamas	7.19	SB
6	2	Gloria Asumnu	Nigeria	7.22	
7	1	Aleen Bailey	Jamaica	7.24	
8	8	Ivet Lalova	Bulgaria	7.27	
