= Track and field at the 2011 Military World Games – Women's 100 metres =

The women's 100 metres event at the 2011 Military World Games was held on 21 July at the Estádio Olímpico João Havelange.

== Records ==
Prior to this competition, the existing world and CISM record were as follows:

World Record	Florence Griffith Joyner (USA)	10.49	Indianapolis, United States	16 July 1988
CISM World Record	Yekaterina Leshchova (RUS)	11.41	Zagreb, Croatia	August 1999

== Schedule ==
Date	Time	Round
21 July 2011		Semifinals
21 July 2011	17:45	Final

== Medalists ==
Gold	Silver	Bronze
Mariya Ryemyen; Ukraine	Ana Cláudia Silva; Brazil	Olesya Povh; Ukraine

== Results ==
=== Final ===
Wind: 0.0 m/s

Rank	Lane	Name	Nationality	Time	Notes
1st place, gold medalist(s)	4	Mariya Ryemyen	Ukraine	11.34	
2nd place, silver medalist(s)	5	Ana Cláudia Silva	Brazil	11.37	
3rd place, bronze medalist(s)	6	Olesya Povh	Ukraine	11.49	
4	3	Daria Korczyńska	Poland	11.60	
5	1	Yuliya Balykina	Belarus	11.70	
6	7	Franciela Krasucki	Brazil	11.74	
7	8	Marika Popowicz	Poland	11.78	
8	2	Johanna Danois	France	11.88	
