= Huang Guifen =

Chinese sprinter (born 1997)

Personal information
- Born: 20 August 1997 (age 28)
- Education: Central South University
- Height: 1.65 m (5 ft 5 in)
- Weight: 56 kg (123 lb)

Sport
- Sport: Athletics
- Event: 400 m
- Coached by: Xiang Chirong, Tan Honghai

Huang Guifen (Chinese: 黃瑰芬; born 20 August 1997) is a Chinese sprinter specialising in the 400 metres. She represented her country in the 4 × 400 metres relay at the 2015 World Championships.

== International competitions ==
Year	Competition	Venue	Position	Event	Notes
Representing China
2013	World Youth Championships	Donetsk, Ukraine	9th (sf)	400 m	54.92
2013	World Youth Championships	Donetsk, Ukraine	6th (h)	Medley relay	2:09.90^{1}
2013	Asian Youth Games	Nanjing, China	1st	200 m	23.82
2013	Asian Youth Games	Nanjing, China	1st	400 m	54.92
2015	Asian Championships	Wuhan, China	1st	4 × 400 m relay	3:33.44
2015	World Championships	Beijing, China	16th (h)	4 × 400 m relay	3:34.98
2015	Military World Games	Mungyeong, South Korea	9th (h)	400 m	55.06
2015	Military World Games	Mungyeong, South Korea	3rd	4 × 100 m relay	45.05
2015	Military World Games	Mungyeong, South Korea	5th	4 × 400 m relay	3:42.09
2016	Asian Junior Championships	Ho Chi Minh City, Vietnam	2nd	400 m	54.92
2016	Asian Junior Championships	Ho Chi Minh City, Vietnam	2nd	4 × 100 m relay	45.41
2016	Asian Beach Games	Danang, Vietnam	6th	60 m	7.90
2016	Asian Beach Games	Danang, Vietnam	3rd	4 × 60 m relay	29.87
2018	World Cup	London, United Kingdom	8th	200 m	23.76
2018	Asian Games	Jakarta, Indonesia	5th	400 m	53.89
2018	Asian Games	Jakarta, Indonesia	1st (h)	4 × 100 m relay	43.66
2018	Asian Games	Jakarta, Indonesia	4th	4 × 400 m relay	3:33.72
2019	Asian Championships	Doha, Qatar	9th (h)	400 m	54.44
2021	Olympic Games	Tokyo, Japan	6th	4 × 100 m relay	42.71
2023	Asian Games	Hangzhou, China	5th	200 m	23.70

^{1}Disqualified in the final

== Personal bests ==
Outdoor

- 100 metres – 11.69 (+0.2 m/s, Pomona 2018)
- 200 metres – 23.07 (+0.4 m/s, Tianjin 2017)
- 400 metres – 53.10 (Guiyang 2017)

Indoor

- 200 metres – 24.17 (Beijing 2015)
- 400 metres – 55.20 (Xianlin 2017)
