= Track and field at the 2015 Military World Games – Women's 400 metres =

The women's 400 metres event at the 2015 Military World Games was held on 6 and 7 October at the KAFAC Sports Complex.

== Records ==
Prior to this competition, the existing world and CISM record were as follows:

World Record	Marita Koch (GDR)	47.60	Canberra, Australia	6 October 1985
CISM World Record	Geisa Coutinho (BRA)	51.08	Rio de Janeiro, Brazil	22 July 2011

== Schedule ==
Date	Time	Round
6 October 2015	11:05	Round 1
7 October 2015	17:20	Final

== Medalists ==
Gold	Silver	Bronze
Salwa Eid Naser; Bahrain	Bianca Răzor; Romania	Nataliia Pygyda; Ukraine

== Results ==
=== Round 1 ===
Qualification: First 3 in each heat (Q) and next 2 fastest (q) qualified for the final.

Rank	Heat	Name	Nationality	Time	Notes
1	1	Salwa Eid Naser	Bahrain	52.97	Q
2	2	Bianca Răzor	Romania	52.98	Q
3	2	Antonina Krivoshapka	Russia	53.10	Q
4	2	Nataliia Pygyda	Ukraine	53.24	Q
5	1	Olha Zemlyak	Ukraine	53.32	Q
6	2	Ewelina Ptak	Poland	53.56	q
7	1	Chandrika Rasnayake	Sri Lanka	54.39	Q
8	1	Rosa Maria Fabian Ferreira	Dominican Republic	55.05	q
9	2	Huang Guifen	China	55.06	
10	1	Aline Leone dos Santos	Brazil	55.52	
11	1	Zhang Xuefei	China	55.67	
	1	Musiko Cathrine Nandi	Kenya	DQ	R163.3
	2	Tailor Diana	Dominican Republic	DNS	

=== Final ===
Rank	Lane	Name	Nationality	Time	Notes
1st place, gold medalist(s)	3	Salwa Eid Naser	Bahrain	51.39	
2nd place, silver medalist(s)	4	Bianca Răzor	Romania	51.81	
3rd place, bronze medalist(s)	8	Nataliia Pygyda	Ukraine	51.99	
4	5	Antonina Krivoshapka	Russia	53.03	
5	2	Ewelina Ptak	Poland	53.16	
6	7	Chandrika Rasnayake	Sri Lanka	54.33	
7	1	Rosa Maria Fabian Ferreira	Dominican Republic	56.49	
	6	Olha Zemlyak	Ukraine	DNS	
