= 2009 World Military Track and Field Championships =

43rd World Military Track and Field Championship
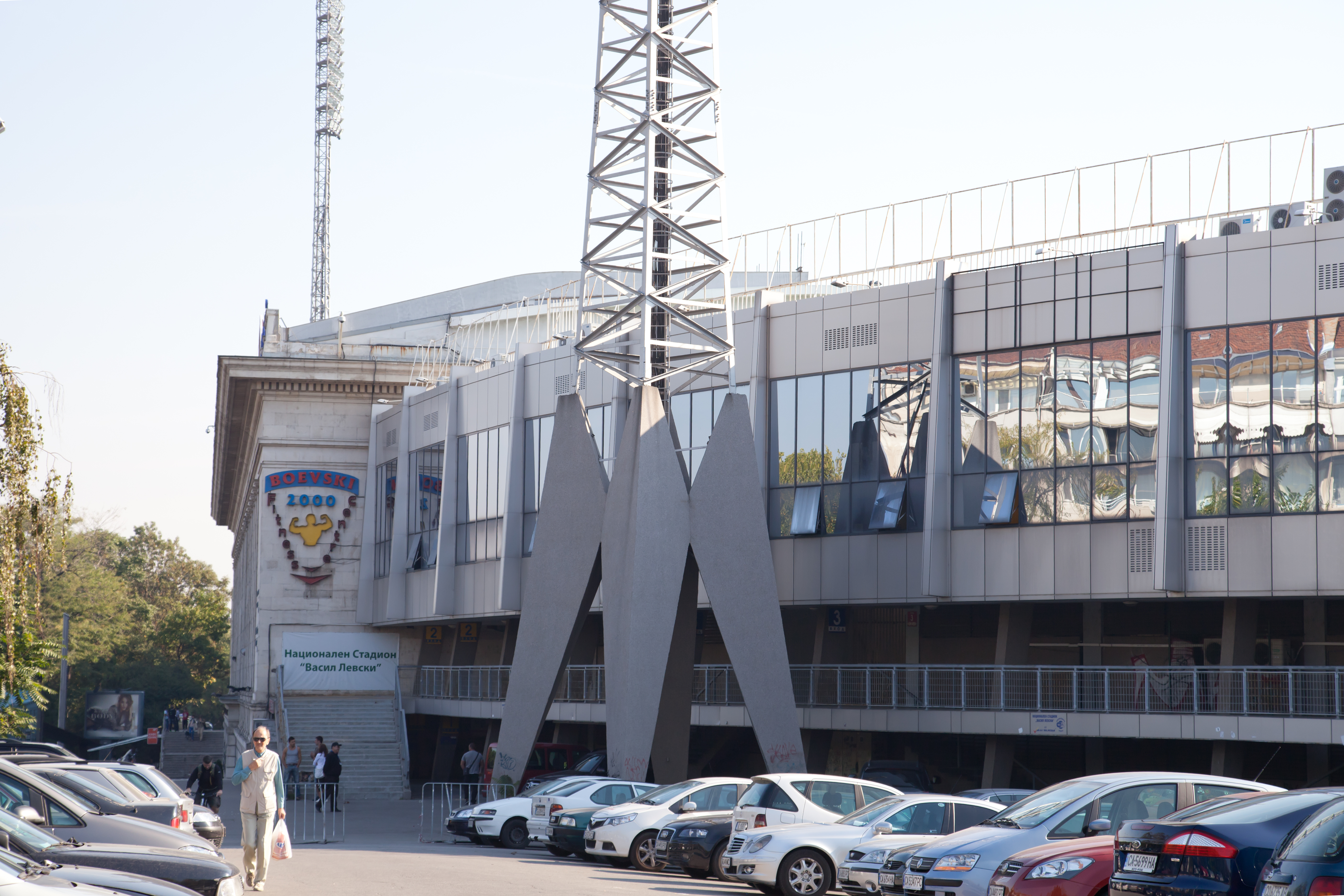
- The host stadium
- Dates: 6 – 13 June
- Host city: Sofia, Bulgaria
- Venue: Vasil Levski National Stadium
- Events: 29
- Participation: 398 athletes from 33 nations

The 2009 World Military Track and Field Championship was the 43rd edition of the international athletics competition between military sports personnel. The competition was held from 6 to 13 June at the Vasil Levski National Stadium in Sofia, Bulgaria. A total of 398 athletes (318 men and 80 women) from 33 nations competed in the 29-event programme.

== Medal summary ==
=== Men ===
Event	Gold		Silver		Bronze	
100 metres	Samuel Francis (QAT)	10.23	Ryan Moseley (AUT)	10.30	Emanuele Di Gregorio (ITA)	10.32
200 metres	Simone Collio (ITA)	20.84	Eddy De Lépine (FRA)	20.91	Bruno Pacheco (BRA)	20.94
400 metres	Piotr Klimczak (POL)	46.52	Marcin Marciniszyn (POL)	46.62	Wallace Vieira (BRA)	46.71
800 metres	Bram Som (NED)	1:46.98	Mouhcine El Amine (MAR)	1:47.63	Sajjad Moradi (IRI)	1:47.86
1500 metres	Abdelkader Bakhtache (FRA)	3:43.60	Samir Khadar (ALG)	3:44.08	Mohamed Hajjaj (MAR)	3:44.93
5000 metres	James Kwalia (QAT)	13:52.62	Essa Ismail Rashed (QAT)	13:56.53	Rabah Aboud (ALG)	14:01.26
10,000 metres	Essa Ismail Rashed (QAT)	29:13.47	Abraham Niyonkuru (BDI)	29:37.14	El Akhdar Hachani (TUN)	29:42.11
110 metres hurdles	Gregory Sedoc (NED)	13.47	Ji Wei (CHN)	13.56	Yin Jing (CHN)	13.64
400 metres hurdles	Christian Grossenbacher (SUI)	51.26	Thiago Sales (BRA)	51.38	Nate Garcia (USA)	51.82
3000 metres steeplechase	Abdelkader Hachlaf (MAR)	8:35.00	Rabia Makhloufi (ALG)	8:35.73	Abubaker Ali Kamal (QAT)	8:36.87
4×100 m relay	Brazil (BRA); Renan Oliveira; Bruno Pacheco; Rodrigo Pereira; Nilson André	40.00	Poland (POL); Piotr Rysiukiewicz; Łukasz Chyła; Marcin Jędrusiński; Kamil Masztak	40.28	Belgium (BEL); Damien Broothaerts; Adrien Deghelt; Denis Goossens; Kevin Rans	40.36
4×400 m relay	Algeria (ALG); Miloud Rahmani; Faycal Doukhi; Faycal Cherifi; Hocine Lamada	3:07.95	Poland (POL); Daniel Dąbrowski; Piotr Rysiukiewicz; Piotr Klimczak; Marcin Marciniszyn	3:08.20	Brazil (BRA); Thiago Sales; Stefany Sergio da Silva; Wagner Francisco Cardoso; Wallace Vieira	3:11.52
High jump	Artsiom Zaitsau (BLR)	2.26 m	Andrea Bettinelli (ITA)	2.23 m	Peter Horák (SVK)	2.20 m
Pole vault	Kevin Rans (BEL)	5.55 m	Giorgio Piantella (ITA)	5.55 m	Denis Goossens (BEL)	5.55 m
Long jump	Yu Zhenwei (CHN)	7.83 m (w)	Mohammad Arzandeh (IRI)	7.70 m	Boris Bozhinov (BUL)	7.68 m (w)
Triple jump	Momchil Karailiev (BUL)	17.22 m	Ibrahim Mohamed Aboubaker (QAT)	16.47 m	Mohammed Hamdi Awadh (QAT)	16.17 m
Shot put	Ralf Bartels (GER)	20.33 m	Miran Vodovnik (SLO)	19.67 m	Andrei Siniakou (BLR)	19.59 m
Discus throw	Piotr Małachowski (POL)	64.94 m	Musab Ibrahim Al-Momani (JOR)	62.36 m NR	Giovanni Faloci (ITA)	61.77 m
Hammer throw	Pavel Kryvitski (BLR)	78.98 m	Marco Lingua (ITA)	78.80 m	Nicola Vizzoni (ITA)	78.06 m
Javelin throw	Matthias de Zordo (GER)	79.92 m	Mark Frank (GER)	77.76 m	Robert Szpak (POL)	77.50 m

=== Women ===
Event	Gold		Silver		Bronze	
100 metres	Inna Eftimova (BUL)	11.49	Bettina Müller-Weissina (AUT)	11.53	Marika Popowicz (POL)	11.57
200 metres	Marta Jeschke (POL)	23.31	Marika Popowicz (POL)	23.32	Inna Eftimova (BUL)	23.59
400 metres	Libania Grenot (ITA)	51.29	Vania Stambolova (BUL)	51.47	Claudia Hoffmann (GER)	52.65
800 metres	Élodie Guégan (FRA)	2:02.38	Sylwia Ejdys (POL)	2:02.76	Halima Hachlaf (MAR)	2:02.86
1500 metres	Sylwia Ejdys (POL)	4:17.78	Sophie Duarte (FRA)	4:19.89	Nadia Noujani (MAR)	4:23.90
5000 metres	Federica Dal Ri (ITA)	15:57.20	Chen Xiaofang (CHN)	16:03.75	Kaltoum Bouaasayriya (MAR)	16:10.51
400 metres hurdles	Vania Stambolova (BUL)	55.30	Benedetta Ceccarelli (ITA)	57.67	Madelene Rondón (VEN)	57.77
High jump	Venelina Veneva-Mateeva (BUL)	1.88 m	Mirela Demireva (BUL)	1.85 m	Gu Xuan (CHN)	1.80 m
Long jump	Nina Kolarič (SLO)	6.55 m	Vanessa Seles (BRA)	6.30 m	Petia Dacheva (BUL)	6.25 m (w)

== Medal table ==
* Host nation (Bulgaria)

Rank	Nation	Gold	Silver	Bronze	Total
1	Poland	4	5	2	11
2	Italy	4	3	3	10
3	Bulgaria*	4	2	3	9
4	Qatar	3	2	2	7
5	France	2	2	0	4
6	Germany	2	1	1	4
7	Belarus	2	0	1	3
8	Netherlands	2	0	0	2
9	Brazil	1	2	3	6
10	China	1	2	2	5
11	Algeria	1	2	1	4
12	Morocco	1	1	4	6
13	Slovenia	1	1	0	2
14	Switzerland	1	0	0	1
15	Austria	0	2	0	2
16	Belgium	0	1	1	2
16	Iran	0	1	1	2
18	Burundi	0	1	0	1
18	Jordan	0	1	0	1
20	United States	0	0	2	2
21	Slovakia	0	0	1	1
21	Tunisia	0	0	1	1
21	Venezuela	0	0	1	1
Totals (23 entries)		29	29	29	87
