= Track and field at the 2011 Military World Games – Women's 4 × 100 metres relay =

The women's 4 × 100 metres relay event at the 2011 Military World Games was held on 23 July at the Estádio Olímpico João Havelange.

== Records ==
Prior to this competition, the existing world and CISM record were as follows:

World Record	West Germany (Silke Gladisch-Möller, Sabine Rieger, Ingrid Auerswald-Lange, Marlies Göhr)	41.37	Canberra, Australia	6 October 1985
CISM World Record	Italy (Anita Pistone, Maria Aurora Salvagno, Rita De Cesaris, Micol Cattaneo)	44.97	Hyderabad, India	October 2007

== Schedule ==
Date	Time	Round
23 July 2011	11:30	Final

== Medalists ==
Gold	Silver	Bronze
Brazil; Geisa Coutinho; Vanda Gomes; Ana Cláudia Silva; Franciela Krasucki	Poland; Marika Popowicz; Daria Korczyńska; Marta Jeschke; Ewelina Ptak	Ukraine; Yevgeniya Snihur; Olena Chebanu; Mariya Ryemyen; Olesya Povh

== Results ==
=== Final ===
Rank	Lane	Nation	Name	Time	Notes
1st place, gold medalist(s)	2	Brazil	Geisa Coutinho, Vanda Gomes, Ana Cláudia Silva, Franciela Krasucki	43.73	CR
2nd place, silver medalist(s)	8	Poland	Marika Popowicz, Daria Korczyńska, Marta Jeschke, Ewelina Ptak	44.35	
3rd place, bronze medalist(s)	4	Ukraine	Yevgeniya Snihur, Olena Chebanu, Mariya Ryemyen, Olesya Povh	45.00	
4	3	Italy	Veronica Borsi, Aurora Salvagno, Jessica Paoletta, Ilenia Draisci	45.08	
5	5	Sri Lanka	Chamali Priyadarshani, Achala Dias, Hsp Buddika, Rmcs Rasnayake	45.58	
6	7	Dominican Republic	Margarita Manzueta, Raisa Sanchez, Yolanda Valerio, Marlenis Veras	45.62	
7	6	Venezuela	Letzabet Hidalgo, Wilmary Álvarez, Prisciliana Chourio, Nancy Garces	46.25	
