= Kateřina Čechová =

Czech sprinter

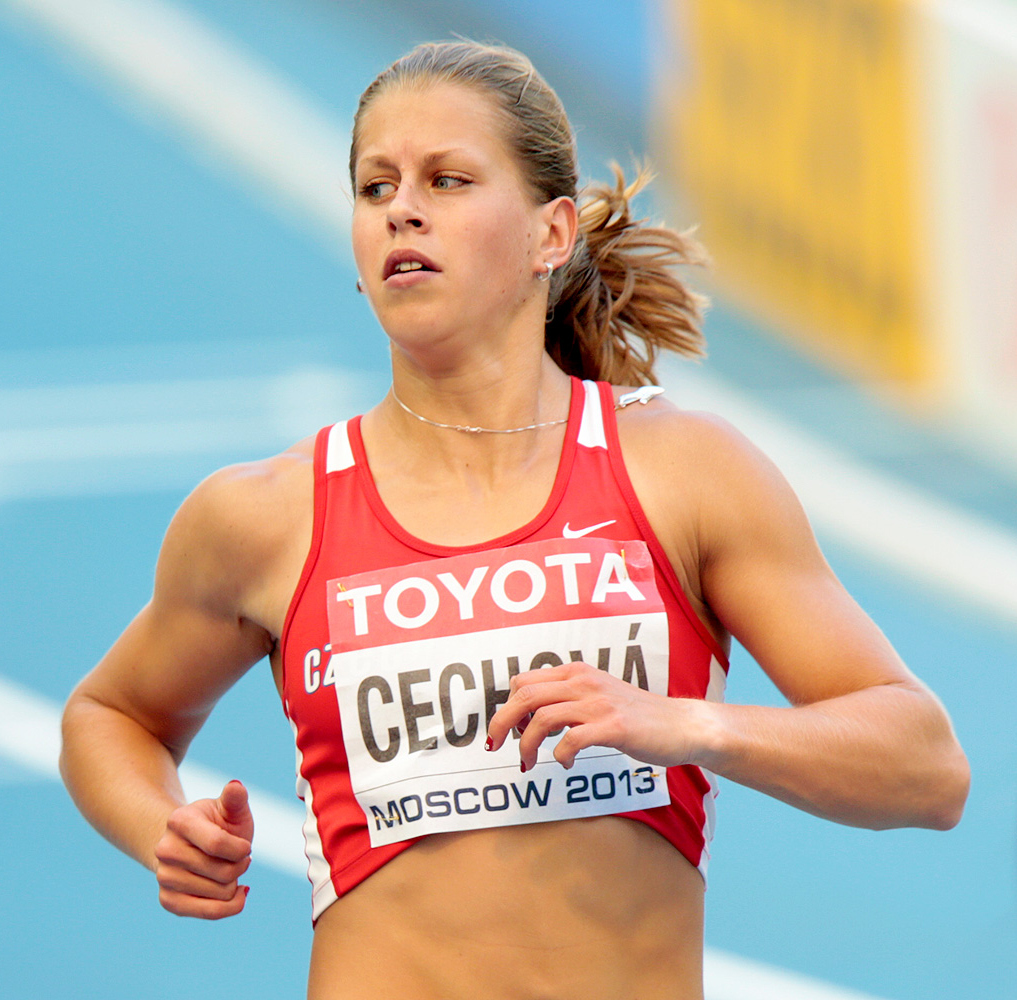
- Kateřina Čechová at 2013 IAAF World Championships in Moscow

Personal information
- Full name: Kateřina Čechová
- Born: 21 March 1988 (age 38) Brno, Czechoslovakia
- Height: 1.73 m (5 ft 8 in)

Sport
- Country: Czech Republic
- Sport: Athletics
- Event(s): 100 metres, 200 metres

Achievements and titles
- Personal bests: 60 m: 7.24 (February 2013) NR; 100 m: 11.32 (June 2012); 200 m: 23.45 (June 2012)

Kateřina Čechová (Czech pronunciation: [ˈkatɛr̝ɪna ˈtʃɛxovaː]; born 21 March 1988 in Brno) is a Czech athlete who specialises in the 100 m and 200 m sprints.

Čechová won the 100 metres at the Czech Athletics Championships in 2008, 2009, 2010, 2011 and 2012. In 2012, she broke the championship record in recording a personal best time of 11.32 seconds and also won gold over 200 metres.

== Achievements ==
Year	Competition	Venue	Position	Event	Notes
Representing Czech Republic
2006	World Junior Championships	Beijing, China	25th (h)	100m	11.85 (wind: +0.6 m/s)
2006	World Junior Championships	Beijing, China	13th (sf)	200m	24.34 (wind: -2.8 m/s)
2007	European Junior Championships	Hengelo, Netherlands	3rd	100 m	11.58
2009	European U23 Championships	Kaunas, Lithuania	9th (sf)	100m	11.75 (wind: -0.5 m/s)
2009	European U23 Championships	Kaunas, Lithuania	—	4 × 100 m relay	DNF
2010	European Championships	Barcelona, Spain	5th (heat)	100 m	11.69
2011	European Indoors	Paris, France	17th (heats – overall)	60 m	7.42
2012	World Indoors	Istanbul, Turkey	14th (semifinal – overall)	60 m	7.31
2012	European Championships	Helsinki, Finland	12th (semifinal – overall)	100 m	11.45
2012	European Championships	Helsinki, Finland	16th (semifinal – overall)	200 m	23.64
2012	Summer Olympics	London, United Kingdom	36th (heats – overall)	100 m	11.43
