= Marika Popowicz-Drapała =

Polish sprinter (born 1988)

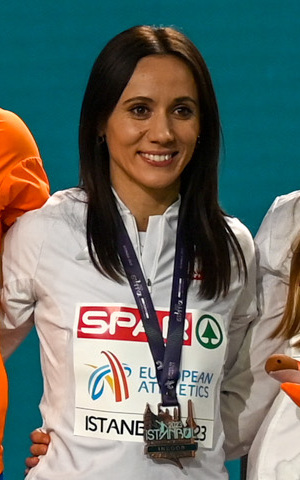
- Popowicz-Drapała in 2023

Personal information
- Full name: Marika Julianna Popowicz-Drapała
- Born: Marika Julianna Popowicz; 28 April 1988 (age 38) Gniezno, Poland
- Height: 1.64 m (5 ft 5 in)
- Weight: 53 kg (117 lb) (2012)

Sport
- Country: Poland
- Sport: Athletics
- Events: 100 metres, 200 m
- Club: Zawisza Bydgoszcz
Medal record
Women's athletics
Representing Poland
World Relays
Silver medal – second place	2024 Nassau	4×400 m relay
European Championships
Silver medal – second place	2022 Munich	4×100 m relay
Bronze medal – third place	2010 Barcelona	4x100 m relay
Bronze medal – third place	2012 Helsinki	4x100 m relay
European Games
Silver medal – second place	2023 Kraków-Małopolska	4 × 100 m relay
European Indoor Championships
Bronze medal – third place	2023 Istanbul	4x400 m relay
European U23 Championships
Silver medal – second place	2009 Kaunas	4x100 m relay
Bronze medal – third place	2009 Kaunas	100 m
Bronze medal – third place	2009 Kaunas	200 m
European U20 Championships
Gold medal – first place	2005 Kaunas	4×100 m
Bronze medal – third place	2007 Hengelo	4×100 m
Universiade
Silver medal – second place	2009 Belgrade	4×100 m relay
Bronze medal – third place	2013 Kazan	4×100 m relay

Marika Popowicz-Drapała (Polish pronunciation: [maˈrika pɔˈpɔvit͡ʂ draˈpawa]; born 28 April 1988) is a Polish track and field sprinter. She won bronze medals in the 100 metres and 200 metres at the 2009 European Under-23 Championships. Popowicz-Drapała earned several major medals as part of Poland's women's relays (mostly 4 x 100 metres relays).

She earned 15 individual Polish national titles.

== Personal life ==
Marika Popowicz-Drapała was born 28 April 1988 in Gniezno, Poland. She is married to a former sprinter, Radosław Drapała.

== Career ==
=== 2005 to 2008 ===
Popowicz-Drapała made her first major appearances in 2005, finishing in sixth place in the 200 metres at the 2005 World Youth Championships in Athletics and helping the Polish women's 4×100 metres relay team to a gold medal at the 2005 European Athletics Junior Championships. She became the Polish junior champion in the 100 metres and 200 m in 2006 and went on to reach the semi-finals of both events at the 2006 World Junior Championships in Athletics in Beijing. She attended the 2007 European Athletics Junior Championships and formed part of the relay team which won the bronze medal. She was selected as a back-up runner for the 2007 World Championships in Athletics, but ultimately did not compete.

=== 2009 ===
Popowicz-Drapała won senior medals for the first time in 2009 at an International Military Sports Council competition: she won the bronze in the 100 m and silver in the 200 m behind Marta Jeschke at the 2009 World Military Track and Field Championship . Representing Poland at the 2009 European Team Championships, she finished fifth overall in the 100 m. She won a relay silver medal with the Polish team at the 2009 Summer Universiade and repeated the feat at the 2009 European Athletics U23 Championships (where she also won bronze medals in the 100 and 200 m events). She was selected for the 100 metres at the 2009 World Championships in Athletics, but did not start.

=== 2010 ===
At the start of 2010, Popowicz-Drapała took part in the women's 60 metres at the 2010 IAAF World Indoor Championships but was eliminated in the heats stage. She helped promote the 2010 IAAF World Cross Country Championships in Bydgoszcz by taking part in a pre-championship cross country race. She won the bronze medal with the Polish 4 x 100 metres relay at the 2010 European Athletics Championships, breaking the Polish national record.

=== Olympic career ===
She was part of Poland's 4 x 100 m relay teams at the 2012 London, 2016 Rio and 2020 Tokyo Olympics. At the 2016 Games, she also competed in the individual 100 metres.

== Statistics ==
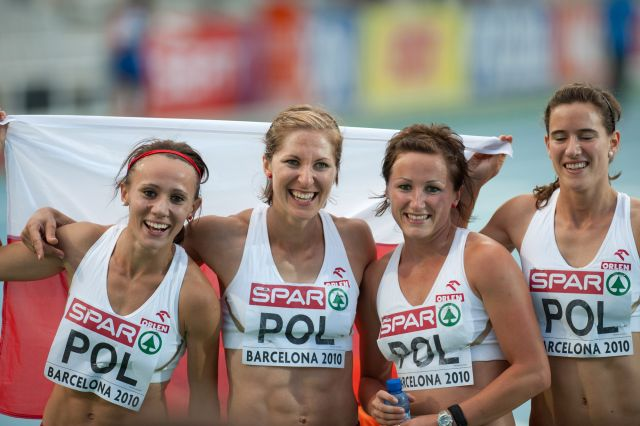
Popowicz-Drapała (L) with relay team at the 2010 European Athletics Championships in Barcelona

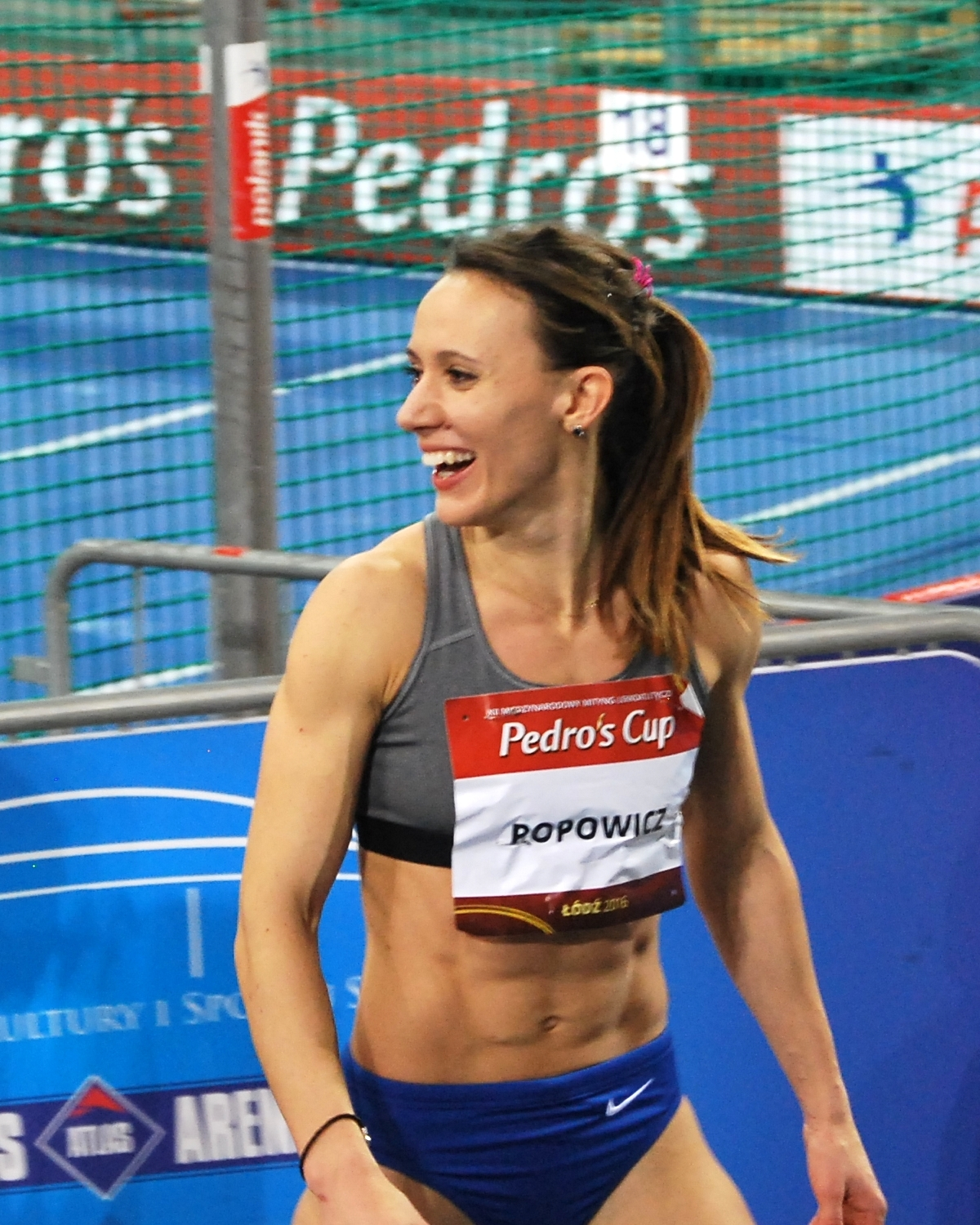
Popowicz-Drapała at the 2016 Pedro's Cup in Łódź

=== International competitions ===
Representing Poland
Year	Competition	Venue	Position	Event	Time
2004	World Junior Championships	Grosseto, Italy	7th	4 × 100 m relay	45.34
2005	World Youth Championships	Marrakesh, Morocco	6th	200 m	23.93
2005	World Youth Championships	Marrakesh, Morocco	4th	Medley relay	2:09.05
2005	European Junior Championships	Kaunas, Lithuania	1st	4 × 100 m relay	44.65
2006	World Junior Championships	Beijing, China	17th (sf)	100 m	11.96 (-0.6 m/s)
2006	World Junior Championships	Beijing, China	10th (sf)	200 m	24.00 (-1.2 m/s)
2006	World Junior Championships	Beijing, China	5th	4 × 100 m relay	44.70
2007	European Junior Championships	Hengelo, Netherlands	5th	100 m	11.67
2007	European Junior Championships	Hengelo, Netherlands	–	200 m	DNF
2007	European Junior Championships	Hengelo, Netherlands	3rd	4 × 100 m relay	45.32
2007	European Junior Championships	Hengelo, Netherlands	5th	4 × 400 m relay	3:39.26
2009	World Military Championships	Sofia, Bulgaria	3rd	100 m	11.57
2009	World Military Championships	Sofia, Bulgaria	2nd	200 m	23.32
2009	European Team Championships Super League	Leiria, Portugal	5th	100 m	11.51
2009	European Team Championships Super League	Leiria, Portugal	5th	4 × 100 m relay	44.04
2009	Universiade	Belgrade, Serbia	2nd	4 × 100 m relay	43.96
2009	European U23 Championships	Kaunas, Lithuania	3rd	100 m	11.50 (+0.2 m/s)
2009	European U23 Championships	Kaunas, Lithuania	3rd	200 m	23.25 (-1.4 m/s)
2009	European U23 Championships	Kaunas, Lithuania	2nd	4 × 100 m relay	43.90
2010	World Indoor Championships	Doha, Qatar	25th (h)	60 m	7.56
2010	European Championships	Barcelona, Spain	27th (h)	100 m	11.80
2010	European Championships	Barcelona, Spain	3rd	4 × 100 m relay	42.68
2011	European Team Championships Super League	Stockholm, Sweden	8th	200 m	24.03
2011	European Team Championships Super League	Stockholm, Sweden	7th	4 × 100 m relay	43.77
2011	Military World Games	Rio de Janeiro, Brazil	7th	100 m	11.78
2011	Military World Games	Rio de Janeiro, Brazil	2nd	4 × 100 m relay	44.35
2011	World Championships	Daegu, South Korea	–	4 × 100 m relay	DNF
2012	European Championships	Helsinki, Finland	14th (sf)	200 m	23.58
2012	European Championships	Helsinki, Finland	3rd	4 × 100 m relay	43.06
2012	Olympic Games	London, United Kingdom	9th (h)	4 × 100 m relay	43.07
2013	European Team Championships Super League	Gateshead, United Kingdom	6th	100 m	11.83
2013	European Team Championships Super League	Gateshead, United Kingdom	5th	200 m	23.58
2013	European Team Championships Super League	Gateshead, United Kingdom	6th	4 × 100 m relay	43.85
2013	Universiade	Kazan, Russia	3rd	4 × 100 m relay	43.81
2013	World Championships	Moscow, Russia	24th (h)	200 m	23.22
2013	World Championships	Moscow, Russia	11th (h)	4 × 100 m relay	43.18
2015	European Indoor Championships	Prague, Czech Republic	21st (sf)	60 m	7.38
2015	World Relays	Nassau, Bahamas	–	4 × 100 m relay	DNF
2015	European Team Championships Super League	Cheboksary, Russia	3rd	4 × 100 m relay	43.28
2015	Military World Games	Rio de Janeiro, Brazil	3rd	100 m	11.50
2015	Military World Games	Rio de Janeiro, Brazil	–	4 × 100 m relay	DNF
2016	World Indoor Championships	Portland, United States	21st (sf)	60 m	7.34
2016	European Championships	Amsterdam, Netherlands	21st (sf)	100 m	11.68
2016	European Championships	Amsterdam, Netherlands	7th	4 × 100 m relay	43.24
2016	Olympic Games	Rio de Janeiro, Brazil	52nd (h)	100 m	11.70
2016	Olympic Games	Rio de Janeiro, Brazil	13th (h)	4 × 100 m relay	43.33
2017	European Team Championships Super League	Villeneuve-d'Ascq, France	2nd	4 × 100 m relay	43.07
2019	World Relays	Yokohama, Japan	–	4 × 100 m relay	DNF
2019	Military World Games	Wuhan, China	3rd (h1)	100 m	11.74
2019	Military World Games	Wuhan, China	5th	4 × 100 m relay	44.80
2021	European Team Championships Super League	Chorzów, Poland	2nd	4 × 100 m relay	43.83
2021	Olympic Games	Tokyo, Japan	10th (h)	4 × 100 m relay	43.09
2022	World Championships	Eugene, United States	11th (h)	4 × 100 m relay	43.19
2022	European Championships	Munich, Germany	17th (h)	200 m	23.47
2022	European Championships	Munich, Germany	2nd	4 × 100 m relay	42.61
2023	European Indoor Championships	Istanbul, Turkey	3rd	4 × 400 m relay	3:29.31
2023	World Championships	Budapest, Hungary	6th	4 × 400 m relay	3:24.93
2024	World Indoor Championships	Glasgow, United Kingdom	8th (h)	4 × 400 m relay	3:28.80
2024	World Relays	Nassau, Bahamas	2nd	4 × 400 m relay	3:24.71
2024	European Championships	Rome, Italy	7th	Mixed 4 × 400 m relay	3:15.32
2024	European Championships	Rome, Italy	6th	4 × 400 m relay	3:23.91
2026	World Indoor Championships	Toruń, Poland	1st (h)	4 × 400 m relay	3:28.06

=== Personal bests ===
- 50 metres indoor – 6.33+ (Spała 2011)
- 60 metres indoor – 7.20 (Toruń 2016)

- 100 metres – 11.28 (Bydgoszcz 2015)
  - 100 metres indoor – 11.91 (Florø 2015)
- 200 metres – 23.15 (Kaunas 2009)
  - 200 metres indoor – 23.54 (Toruń 2023)

=== National titles ===
- Polish Athletics Championships
  - 100 metres: 2009, 2011, 2013, 2015
  - 200 metres: 2009, 2011, 2012, 2013
  - 4 × 100 m relay: 2019, 2022
- Polish Indoor Athletics Championships
  - 60 metres: 2010, 2011, 2013, 2016, 2020
  - 200 metres: 2010, 2013
