= Anjana Thamke =

Indian athlete (born 1997)

Personal information
- Nationality: Indian
- Born: 16 November 1997 (age 28) Ganeshgaon, Nashik, Maharashtra, India

Sport
- Country: India
- Sport: Athletics
- Events: 400 metres, 800 metres and 1500 metres

Achievements and titles
- Personal bests: 800m: 2:11.47 sec (Nanjing 2013)

Anjana Thamke (born 16 November 1997) is an Indian athlete who competes in the 400 metres, 800 metres and 1500 metres event.

Anjana Thamke is supported by Anglian Medal Hunt Company

== Early life ==
Hailing from impoverishment in a remote village in Nashik, Anjana's training began when she had to jog seven kilometres to school every day. Her passion for mid-distance running started when she started to take part in the village school athletics competitions. From there on Anjana started to impress her teachers who later on encouraged her to take part in district events. It was in 2011 that Anjana caught the eye of Vijender Singh, a Sports Authority of India (SAI) accredited coach. Under the dedicated tutelage of coach Vijender Singh, she has gone from strength to strength, over-achieving her way to success in the junior Indian athletics circuit.

== Career highlights ==
The 15-year-old mid-distance runner has already notched up national records in the 400m, 800m and 1500m categories of the under-17 section. Anjana was adjudged 'Best Athlete' in the National Junior Athletics Championship, 2012, under the U-16 category. Anjana also won three gold medals at the 24th All India Track and Field Juniors Tournament at Balewadi in Pune (2012). She won Gold in the 1500m and 400m run in the U-17 section of the National School Games. In 2011, Anjana won Gold, meeting the record in the U-19 section of the 56th National School Games. Anjana Thamke collected a gold medal in the 800 metres event at the 2013 Asian Youth Games held in Nanjing. She also won two gold medals at the Asian School Meet in Malaysia in the 800 metres event and the 4x400 relay.
