= Ulfa Silpiana =

Indonesian sprinter

Personal information
- Nationality: Indonesian
- Born: 8 March 1997 (age 28)

Sport
- Sport: Sprinting
- Event: 200 metres

Ulfa Silpiana (born 8 March 1997) is an Indonesian sprinter. She competed in the women's 200 metres at the 2017 World Championships in Athletics.
