= Nguyễn Thị Trúc Mai =

Vietnamese long jumper

Nguyen Thi Truc Mai
Personal information
- Nationality: Vietnam
- Born: 20 March 1997 (age 29) Tam Bình, Vĩnh Long Province

Sport
- Sport: Athletics
- Event: Long jump
Medal record
Women's athletics
Representing Vietnam
Asian Beach Games
Silver medal – second place	2016 Da Nang	Long jump

Nguyễn Thị Trúc Mai (born 20 March 1997 in Tam Bình, Vĩnh Long Province) is a Vietnamese long jumper.

She finished eighth at the 2018 Asian Games.

Her personal best jump is 6.41 metres, achieved in July 2018 in Ho Chi Minh City, albeit without the wind information being registered.
