= Lucienne M'belu =

French sprinter

Lucienne M'belu (born August 3, 1989 in Créteil) is a French athlete, who specializes in 100 meter and 200 meter competitions. Her club is EACPA (l'Entente Agglomération Cergy Pontoise Athlétisme).
