= Marina Panteleyeva =

Russian sprinter

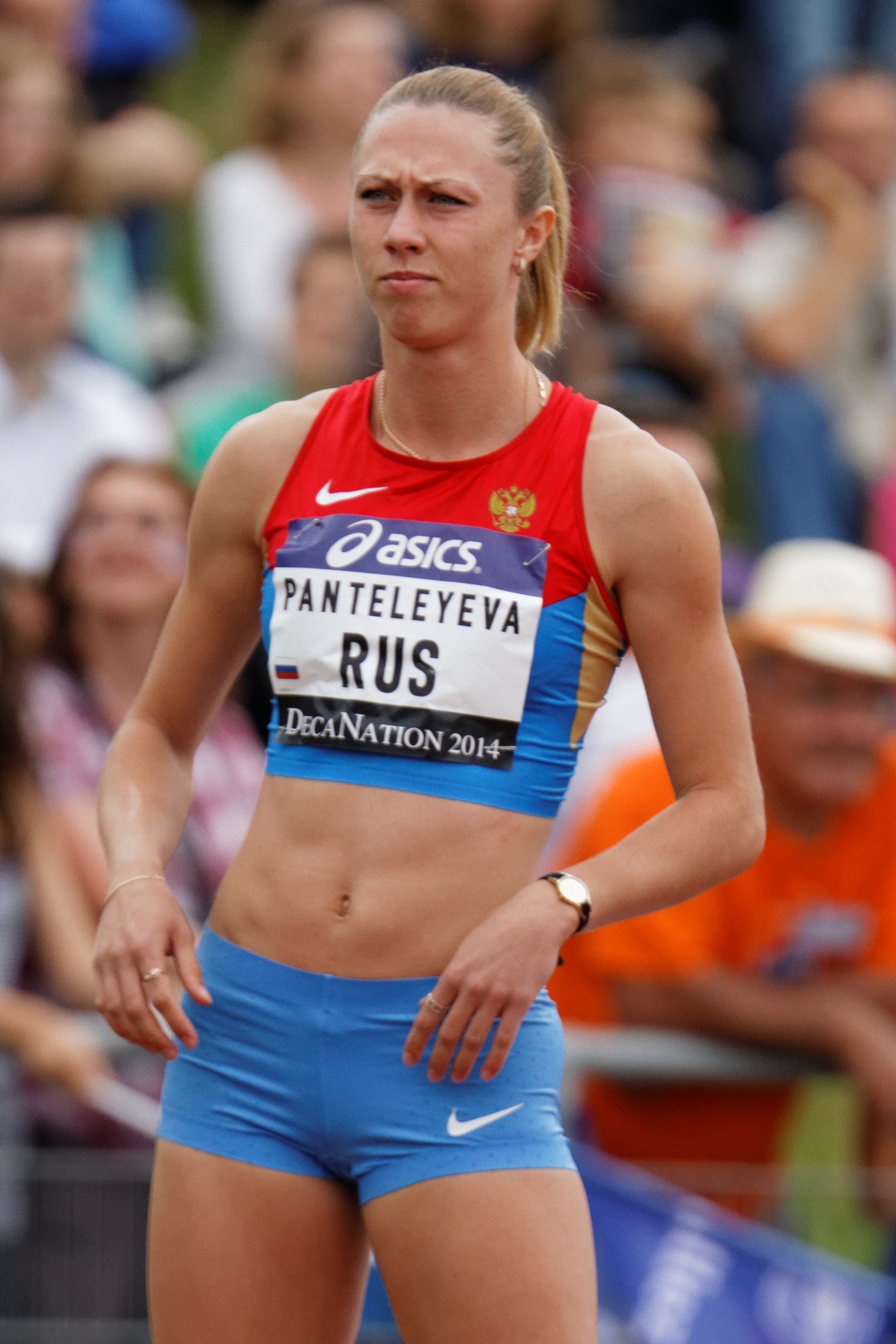
- Marina Panteleyeva in 2014

Personal information
- Born: 16 May 1989 (age 37)

Sport
- Country: Russia
- Sport: Track and field
- Event(s): 100 metres 4 × 100 metres relay
Medal record
European Championships
Bronze medal – third place	2014 Zürich	4 x 100 m

Marina Panteleyeva (born 16 May 1989) is a Russian sprinter. She competed in the 4 × 100 metres relay event at the 2015 World Championships in Athletics in Beijing, China.
