= Weronika Wedler =

Polish sprinter

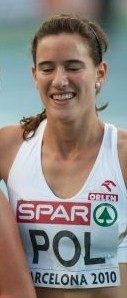
- Wedler at the 2010 European Championships

Personal information
- Nationality: Poland
- Born: 17 July 1989 (age 36) Wrocław, Poland
- Height: 1.74 m (5 ft 8 1/2 in)
- Weight: 57 kg (126 lb) (2012)

Sport
- Sport: Athletics
- Club: AZS AWF Wrocław
Medal record
Women's athletics
Representing Poland
European Championships
Bronze medal – third place	2010 Barcelona	4 x 100 m
European Athletics U23 Championships
Silver medal – second place	2009 Kaunas	4 x 100 m
Universiade
Bronze medal – third place	2013 Kazan	4 × 100 m

Weronika Wedler (born 17 July 1989 in Wrocław) is a Polish sprint athlete. She won several medals with the Polish 4 × 100 metres relay team.

== Competition record ==
Year	Competition	Venue	Position	Event	Notes
Representing Poland
2007	European Junior Championships	Hengelo, Netherlands	24th (h)	100 m	12.07
2007	European Junior Championships	Hengelo, Netherlands	3rd	4 × 100 m relay	45.32
2008	World Junior Championships	Bydgoszcz, Poland	30th (h)	100 m	12.02 (wind: -1.9 m/s)
2008	World Junior Championships	Bydgoszcz, Poland	18th (sf)	200 m	24.17 (wind: -1.9 m/s)
2008	World Junior Championships	Bydgoszcz, Poland	6th (h)	4 × 100 m relay	44.73
2009	European U23 Championships	Kaunas, Lithuania	11th (sf)	100 m	11.82 (wind: -0.5 m/s)
2009	European U23 Championships	Kaunas, Lithuania	6th	200 m	23.66 (wind: -1.4 m/s)
2009	European U23 Championships	Kaunas, Lithuania	2nd	4 × 100 m relay	43.90
2010	European Championships	Barcelona, Spain	10th	200 m	23.30
2010	European Championships	Barcelona, Spain	3rd	4 × 100 m relay	42.68
2013	Universiade	Kazan, Russia	13th (sf)	100 m	11.81
2013	Universiade	Kazan, Russia	3rd	4 × 100 m relay	43.81
2015	World Championships	Beijing, China	11th (h)	4 × 100 m relay	43.20

== Personal bests ==
Outdoor

- 100 metres – 11.35 (+2.0 m/s) (Sosnowiec 2011)
- 200 metres – 23.21 (-0.4 m/s) (Bydgoszcz 2010)

Indoor

- 60 metres – 7.38 (Spała 2010)
- 200 metres – 23.58 (Sopot 2014)
