= Athletics World Cup =

Quadrennial international team competition

2018 Athletics World Cup
- Dates: 14–15 July
- Host city: London, United Kingdom
- Venue: London Stadium
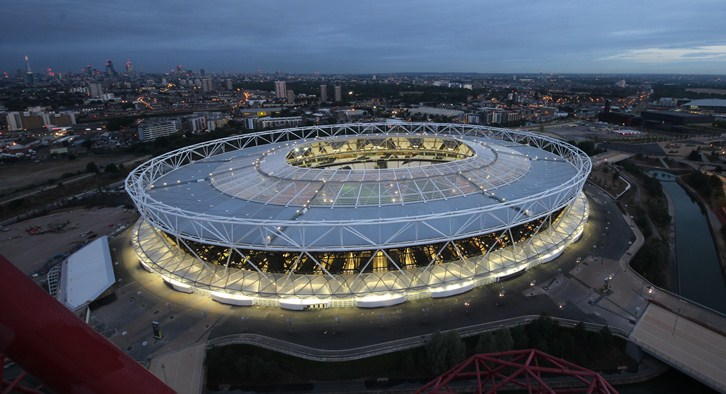
- Type: Outdoor
- Events: 34
- Participation: 416 athletes from 8 nations
- Team Prize Money (US$): Platinum Trophy; $2 million total prize $450,000 top prize

The Athletics World Cup was a team-based international athletics competition held in 2018. It featured eight national teams based on world rankings, with each team entering one athlete per event, and points gained on the basis of finishing position. Although the majority of world championship events were contested, no races over 1500 metres were held, and no road events or multi-events were on the program. The competition focused on an overall team prize, the Platinum Trophy and Platinum team medals, but individual gold, silver and bronze medals were also awarded in each individual event.

The United States won the inaugural edition, finishing ahead of Poland, with Great Britain and Northern Ireland in third overall. While the event was organised outside of the official World Athletics structures, at the time the IAAF expressed support for the event notwithstanding the existence of its own IAAF Continental Cup event. The event was branded a failure by sports journalists, with many big-name star athletes failing to take part. The event was discontinued after its first edition.

== History ==
The competition was announced on 5 February 2018 with London hosting. All events were held at London Stadium on 14 & 15 July 2018.

== Competition structure ==
The competition featured just 8 nations taking part in all events over two days. Each nation entered one male and one female athlete in every event in a straight final format. For its inaugural event, all nations' captains were female in celebration of 100 years since women were given the right to vote in the United Kingdom.

=== Events ===
In 2018, the following events were contested: 100 metres, 200 metres, 400 metres, 800 metres, 1500 metres, 100 metre hurdles (women), 110 metre hurdles (men), 400 metre hurdles, 4 x 100 metres relay, 4 x 400 metres relay, long jump, triple jump, shot put, discus throw, javelin throw, hammer throw, pole vault and high jump.

=== Nations ===
Participation was based on placings at the 2017 World Championships in Athletics in World Cup events (multi-events, and races longer than 1500m were therefore ignored). The following eight nations competed:

- China
- France
- Germany
- (United Kingdom) Great Britain and Northern Ireland (host)
- Jamaica
- Poland
- South Africa
- United States

Traditional distance-running powers, Kenya and Ethiopia, were ranked among the first eight nations in the placing table overall at the 2017 Championships, but were not invited as they finished outside the top eight when considering only World Cup events.

== Media coverage ==
On 20 June 2018, Sky Sports were announced as the host broadcaster within the UK and Ireland. They exclusively broadcast both evenings of the competition and also produced the world feed for other nations.

== Event schedule and standings ==
Schedule

Date →	14 VII		15 VII	
Event ↓	Men	Women	Men	Women
100 m		•	•	
200 m	•			•
400 m		•	•	
800 m	•			•
1500 m		•	•	
100 m hurdles				•
110 m hurdles	•			
400 m hurdles		•	•	
4 × 100 m relay	•			•
4 × 400 m relay		•	•	
Long jump		•	•	
Triple jump	•			•
High jump	•			•
Pole vault		•	•	
Shot put	•			•
Discus throw	•			•
Hammer throw		•	•	
Javelin throw		•	•	

Final standings

Pos	Country	Pts	Prize money
1	United States	219	$450,000
2	Poland	162	$400,000
3	Great Britain	155	$350,000
4	Jamaica	153	$300,000
5	France	146	$250,000
6	Germany	137	$200,000
7	South Africa	135	$150,000
8	China	81	$100,000

Medal table

Rank	Nation	Gold	Silver	Bronze	Total
1	United States (USA)	11	10	6	27
2	Jamaica (JAM)	6	6	4	16
3	Poland (POL)	6	5	2	13
4	Great Britain (GBR)*	3	5	5	13
5	South Africa (RSA)	3	3	3	9
6	China (CHN)	2	2	2	6
6	Germany (GER)	2	2	2	6
8	France (FRA)	1	1	10	12
Totals (8 entries)		34	34	34	102

Key

* Host nation (Great Britain)

== Results summary ==
Event	Gold		Silver		Bronze	
Men's results
100 metres	Tyquendo Tracey (JAM)	10.03	Kendal Williams (USA)	10.05	Simon Magakwe (RSA)	10.11
200 metres	Xie Zhenye (CHN)	20.25	Luxolo Adams (RSA)	20.45	Ameer Webb (USA)	20.51
400 metres	Paul Dedewo (USA)	44.48	Derrick Mokaleng (RSA)	45.48	Ludvy Vaillant (FRA)	45.64
800 metres	Clayton Murphy (USA)	1:46.52	Adam Kszczot (POL)	1:46.98	Elliot Giles (GBR)	1:47.40
1500 metres	Marcin Lewandowski (POL)	3:52.88	Timo Benitz (GER)	3:53.11	Neil Gourley (GBR)	3:53.24
110 m hurdles	Pascal Martinot-Lagarde (FRA)	13.22	Ronald Levy (JAM)	13.30	Devon Allen (USA)	13.36
400 m hurdles	Kenny Selmon (USA)	48.97	Patryk Dobek (POL)	49.02	Dai Greene (GBR)	49.48
4 × 100 m relay	United States (USA); Jeff Demps; Kendal Williams; Obi Igbokwe; Cameron Burrell	38.42	Jamaica (JAM); Javoy Tucker; Nesta Carter; Kenroy Anderson; Tyquendo Tracey	38.52	South Africa (RSA); Antonio Alkana; Simon Magakwe; Roscoe Engel; Luxolo Adams	38.53
4 × 400 m relay	United States (USA); Nathan Strother; Obi Igbokwe; Paul Dedewo; Kahmari Montgomery	2:59.77	Poland (POL); Dariusz Kowaluk; Rafał Omelko; Mateusz Rzeźniczak; Karol Zalewski	3:02.80	Germany (GER); Johannes Trefz; Torben Junker; Fabian Dammermann; Patrick Schneider	3:03.16
High jump	Jeron Robinson (USA)	2.30	Wang Yu (CHN)	2.27	Tobias Potye (GER)	2.24
Pole vault	Sam Kendricks (USA)	5.83	Raphael Holzdeppe (GER)	5.75	Axel Chapelle (FRA)	5.65
Long jump	Luvo Manyonga (RSA)	8.51	Zack Bazile (USA)	8.30	Ramone Bailey (JAM)	8.13
Triple jump	Karol Hoffmann (POL)	16.74	Donald Scott (USA)	16.73	Kevin Luron (FRA)	16.67
Shot put	Michał Haratyk (POL)	21.95	Darrell Hill (USA)	21.43	O'Dayne Richards (JAM)	20.05
Discus throw	Fedrick Dacres (JAM)	65.32	Victor Hogan (RSA)	63.73	Lolassonn Djouhan (FRA)	63.48
Hammer throw	Wojciech Nowicki (POL)	77.94	Nick Miller (GBR)	76.14	Quentin Bigot (FRA)	74.98
Javelin throw	Julian Weber (GER)	82.80	Marcin Krukowski (POL)	80.25	Curtis Thompson (USA)	75.47
Women's results
100 metres	Ashley Henderson (USA)	11.07	Elaine Thompson (JAM)	11.09	Carina Horn (RSA)	11.21
200 metres	Shericka Jackson (JAM)	22.35	Jenna Prandini (USA)	22.45	Beth Dobbin (GBR)	22.95
400 metres	Stephenie Ann McPherson (JAM)	50.69	Floria Gueï (FRA)	51.84	Justyna Święty-Ersetic (POL)	51.89
800 metres	Raevyn Rogers (USA)	2:00.20	Adelle Tracey (GBR)	2:01.05	Simoya Campbell (JAM)	2:01.59
1500 metres	Sofia Ennaoui (POL)	4:07.66	Rachel Schneider (USA)	4:08.04	Jemma Reekie (GBR)	4:09.05
100 m hurdles	Rikenette Steenkamp (RSA)	12.88	Jeanine Williams (JAM)	12.95	Queen Harrison (USA)	12.99
400 m hurdles	Janieve Russell (JAM)	55.10	Meghan Beesley (GBR)	55.90	Aurélie Chaboudez (FRA)	56.23
4 × 100 m relay	Great Britain (GBR); Asha Philip; Imani Lansiquot; Bianca Williams; Shannon Hylton	42.52	Jamaica (JAM); Shelly-Ann Fraser-Pryce; Shericka Jackson; Jonielle Smith; Tissanna Hickling	42.60	China (CHN); Liang Xiaojing; Wei Yongli; Ge Manqi; Yuan Qiqi	42.94
4 × 400 m relay	United States (USA); Brionna Thomas; Jasmine Blocker; Kiana Horton; Courtney Okolo	3:24.28	Jamaica (JAM); Christine Day; Janieve Russell; Tiffany James; Stephenie Ann McPherson	3:2429	France (FRA); Elea-Mariama Diarra; Déborah Sananes; Cynthia Anaïs; Floria Gueï	3:25.91
High jump	Vashti Cunningham (USA)	1.96	Morgan Lake (GBR)	1.93	Prisca Duvernay (FRA)	1.83
Pole vault	Holly Bradshaw (GBR)	4.75	Katie Nageotte (USA)	4.68	Ninon Guillon-Romarin (FRA)	4.68
Long jump	Lorraine Ugen (GBR)	6.86	Quanesha Burks (USA)	6.48	Tissanna Hickling (JAM)	6.47
Triple jump	Shanieka Ricketts (JAM)	14.61	Keturah Orji (USA)	14.60	Anna Jagaciak-Michalska (POL)	14.08
Shot put	Gong Lijiao (CHN)	19.90	Paulina Guba (POL)	19.29	Maggie Ewan (USA)	18.23
Discus throw	Claudine Vita (GER)	62.92	Su Xinyue (CHN)	62.62	Valarie Allman (USA)	61.10
Hammer throw	Anita Włodarczyk (POL)	78.74	Sophie Hitchon (GBR)	73.48	Alexandra Tavernier (FRA)	73.38
Javelin throw	Sunette Viljoen (RSA)	61.69	Kara Winger (USA)	60.75	Lü Huihui (CHN)	60.40

== Detailed results ==
=== Men ===
==== 100 metres ====
15 July

Rank	Lane	Name	Nationality	Time	Notes	Points
1st place, gold medalist(s)	2	Tyquendo Tracey	Jamaica	10.03	PB	8
2nd place, silver medalist(s)	5	Kendal Williams	United States	10.05		7
3rd place, bronze medalist(s)	1	Simon Magakwe	South Africa	10.11		6
4	7	Ojie Edoburun	Great Britain	10.22		5
5	3	Xu Zhouzheng	China	10.32		4
6	4	Marvin René	France	10.35		3
7	6	Lucas Jakubczyk	Germany	10.38		2
8	8	Remigiusz Olszewski	Poland	10.42		1

==== 200 metres ====
14 July

Rank	Lane	Name	Nationality	Time	Notes	Points
1st place, gold medalist(s)	6	Xie Zhenye	China	20.25		8
2nd place, silver medalist(s)	2	Luxolo Adams	South Africa	20.45		7
3rd place, bronze medalist(s)	5	Ameer Webb	United States	20.51		6
4	8	Jahnoy Thompson	Jamaica	20.84		5
5	3	Mickaël-Méba Zeze	France	20.92		4
6	1	Delano Williams	United Kingdom	20.97		3
7	4	Karol Zalewski	Poland	21.14		2
8	7	Michael Bryan	Germany	21.45		1

==== 400 metres ====
15 July

Rank	Lane	Name	Nationality	Time	Notes	Points
1st place, gold medalist(s)	5	Paul Dedewo	United States	44.48	PB	8
2nd place, silver medalist(s)	6	Derrick Mokaleng	South Africa	45.48		7
3rd place, bronze medalist(s)	4	Ludvy Vaillant	France	45.64		6
4	3	Rabah Yousif	Great Britain	45.88		5
5	7	Rusheen McDonald	Jamaica	45.98		4
6	2	Jakub Krzewina	Poland	46.89		3
7	8	Marvin Schlegel	Germany	47.35		2

- China withdrew from this event and were awarded 0 points.

==== 800 metres ====
14 July

Rank	Lane	Name	Nationality	Time	Notes	Points
1st place, gold medalist(s)	6	Clayton Murphy	United States	1:46.52		8
2nd place, silver medalist(s)	2	Adam Kszczot	Poland	1:46.98		7
3rd place, bronze medalist(s)	7	Elliot Giles	Great Britain	1:47.40		6
4	4	Gabriel Tual	France	1:47.44		5
5	3	Benedikt Huber	Germany	1:48.52		4
6	1	Rynardt van Rensburg	South Africa	1:49.14		3
7	8	Jauvaney James	Jamaica	1:51.44		2
8	5	Ma Junyi	China	1:53.57		1

==== 1500 metres ====
15 July

Rank	Lane	Name	Nationality	Time	Notes	Points
1st place, gold medalist(s)	1	Marcin Lewandowski	Poland	3:52.88		8
2nd place, silver medalist(s)	2	Timo Benitz	Germany	3:53.11		7
3rd place, bronze medalist(s)	3	Neil Gourley	Great Britain	3:53.24		6
4	4	Izaic Yorks	United States	3:53.50		5
5	6	Jerry Motsau	South Africa	3:55.00		4
6	8	Simon Denissel	France	3:55.35		3
7	5	Wang Shaojie	China	3:58.60		2
8	7	Kemoy Campbell	Jamaica	4:01.06		1

==== 110 metres hurdles ====
14 July

Rank	Lane	Name	Nationality	Time	Notes	Points
1st place, gold medalist(s)	3	Pascal Martinot-Lagarde	France	13.22	SB	8
2nd place, silver medalist(s)	6	Ronald Levy	Jamaica	13.30		7
3rd place, bronze medalist(s)	8	Devon Allen	United States	13.36		6
4	1	Antonio Alkana	South Africa	13.38		5
5	7	Xie Wenjun	China	13.54		4
6	5	Damian Czykier	Poland	13.56		3
7	4	Martin Vogel	Germany	14.08	SB	2
	2	Andrew Pozzi	Great Britain	DNF		0

==== 400 metres hurdles ====
15 July

Rank	Lane	Name	Nationality	Time	Notes	Points
1st place, gold medalist(s)	2	Kenny Selmon	United States	48.97		8
2nd place, silver medalist(s)	5	Patryk Dobek	Poland	49.02		7
3rd place, bronze medalist(s)	6	Dai Greene	Great Britain	49.48		6
4	8	Annsert Whyte	Jamaica	49.80		5
5	7	Victor Coroller	France	49.96		4
6	4	Joshua Abuaku	Germany	50.78	PB	3
7	3	Lindsay Hanekom	South Africa	54.28		2

- China withdrew from this event and were awarded 0 points.

==== 4 × 100 metres relay ====
14 July

Rank	Lane	Names	Nationality	Time	Notes	Points
1st place, gold medalist(s)	8	Jeff Demps; Kendal Williams; Obi Igbokwe; Cameron Burrell	United States	38.42		8
2nd place, silver medalist(s)	2	Javoy Tucker; Nesta Carter; Kenroy Anderson; Tyquendo Tracey	Jamaica	38.52		7
3rd place, bronze medalist(s)	5	Antonio Alkana; Simon Magakwe; Roscoe Engel; Luxolo Adams	South Africa	38.53		6
4	3	Michael Bryan; Patrick Domogala; Roy Schmidt; Aleixo-Platini Menga	Germany	38.56	SB	5
5	6	Mickaël-Méba Zeze; Marvin René; Stuart Dutamby; Mouhamadou Fall	France	38.61	SB	4
6	7	Xu Haiyang; Liang Jinsheng; Bie Ge; Xu Zhouzheng	China	38.87		3
7	1	Krzysztof Grześkowiak; Remigiusz Olszewski; Dominik Kopeć; Przemysław Słowikowski	Poland	38.91	SB	2
8	4	Reuben Arthur; Sam Gordon; Andy Robertson; Confidence Lawson	Great Britain	38.97		1

==== 4 × 400 metres relay ====
15 July

Rank	Lane	Names	Nationality	Time	Notes	Point
1st place, gold medalist(s)	4	Nathan Strother; Obi Igbokwe; Paul Dedewo; Kahmari Montgomery	United States	2:59.78	SB	8
2nd place, silver medalist(s)	5	Dariusz Kowaluk; Rafał Omelko; Mateusz Rzeźniczak; Karol Zalewski	Poland	3:02.80		7
3rd place, bronze medalist(s)	7	Johannes Trefz; Torben Junker; Fabian Dammermann; Patrick Schneider	Germany	3:03.16		6
4	6	Rusheen McDonald; Ivan Henry; Steven Gayle; Devaughn Baker	Jamaica	3:04.96		5
	8	Mame-Ibra Anne; Mamoudou-Elimane Hanne; Patrice Maurice; Thomas Jordier	France	DQ	R170.19	0
	3	Thapelo Phora; Pieter Conradie; Zakhitine Nene; Derrick Mokaleng	South Africa	DQ	R170.19	0
	2	Cameron Chalmers; Dwayne Cowan; Martyn Rooney; Owen Smith	Great Britain	DNS		0

- China withdrew from this event and were awarded 0 points.

==== High jump ====
14 July

Rank	Name	Nationality	2.00	2.05	2.10	2.15	2.18	2.21	2.24	2.27	2.30	2.34	Mark	Notes	Points
1st place, gold medalist(s)	Jeron Robinson	United States	–	–	–	–	o	o	o	o	o	xxx	2.30		8
2nd place, silver medalist(s)	Wang Yu	China	–	–	–	o	–	o	xxo	xo	xxx		2.27		7
3rd place, bronze medalist(s)	Tobias Potye	Germany	–	–	xo	xo	xo	xo	xo	xxx			2.24		6
4	Chris Moleya	South Africa	–	–	o	o	xo	o	xxx				2.21		5
5	Chris Baker	Great Britain	–	o	o	o	xo	xxo	xxx				2.21		4
6	Sylwester Bednarek	Poland	–	–	xo	o	o	xxx					2.18		3
7	Quentin Aboukir	France	xo	o	o	xxx							2.10		2
	Clayton Brown	Jamaica											DNS		0

==== Pole vault ====
15 July

Rank	Name	Nationality	5.00	5.20	5.35	5.50	5.65	5.75	5.83	6.05	Mark	Notes	Points
1st place, gold medalist(s)	Sam Kendricks	United States	–	–	o	o	o	o	o	xxx	5.83		8
2nd place, silver medalist(s)	Raphael Holzdeppe	Germany	–	–	–	xo	o	xo	xxx		5.75		7
3rd place, bronze medalist(s)	Axel Chapelle	France	–	–	o	o	o	xx-	x		5.65		6
4	Charlie Myers	Great Britain	–	o	o	o	xxx				5.50		5
5	Piotr Lisek	Poland	–	–	xo	xxo	xx-	x			5.50		4
6	Xue Changrui	China	–	xo	o	xxx					5.35		3
	Cameron Walker-Shepherd	Jamaica	xxx								NM		0
	Valko van Wyk	South Africa									DNS		0

==== Long jump ====
15 July

Rank	Name	Nationality	#1	#2	#3	#4	Mark	Notes	Points
1st place, gold medalist(s)	Luvo Manyonga	South Africa	8.51	8.48	8.50	8.50	8.51		8
2nd place, silver medalist(s)	Zack Bazile	United States	7.84	x	8.09	8.30	8.30		7
3rd place, bronze medalist(s)	Ramone Bailey	Jamaica	8.13	7.86	x	x	8.13	SB	6
4	Tomasz Jaszczuk	Poland	7.85	7.92	7.95	8.05	8.05	SB	5
5	Huang Changzhou	China	7.96	x	8.01	x	8.01		4
6	Julian Howard	Germany	7.71	7.61	x	7.76	7.76		3
7	Yann Randrianasolo	France	7.68	7.63	x	7.50	7.68		2
8	Dan Bramble	Great Britain	7.46	7.64	x	x	7.64		1

==== Triple jump ====
14 July

Rank	Name	Nationality	#1	#2	#3	#4	Mark	Notes	Points
1st place, gold medalist(s)	Karol Hoffmann	Poland	16.45	16.74	x	x	16.74	SB	8
2nd place, silver medalist(s)	Donald Scott	United States	15.71	16.51	16.41	16.73	16.73		7
3rd place, bronze medalist(s)	Kevin Luron	France	16.55	16.67	x	16.08	16.67		6
4	Godfrey Mokoena	South Africa	16.44	14.79	15.42	15.93	16.44		5
5	Jordan Scott	Jamaica	x	x	16.31	x	16.31		4
6	Nathan Douglas	Great Britain	x	16.12	x	16.24	16.24		3
7	Benjamin Bauer	Germany	15.49	x	14.12	15.43	15.49		2
8	Dong Bin	China	x	x	x	15.40	15.40		1

==== Shot put ====
14 July

Rank	Name	Nationality	#1	#2	#3	#4	Mark	Notes	Points
1st place, gold medalist(s)	Michał Haratyk	Poland	21.39	21.77	21.95	21.57	21.95		8
2nd place, silver medalist(s)	Darrell Hill	United States	20.67	21.03	21.43	x	21.43		7
3rd place, bronze medalist(s)	O'Dayne Richards	Jamaica	19.93	20.05	x	x	20.05		6
4	Orazio Cremona	South Africa	19.58	x	19.97	19.57	19.97		5
5	Frédéric Dagée	France	x	x	18.98	19.62	19.62		4
6	Simon Bayer	Germany	19.38	x	x	19.43	19.43		3
7	Scott Lincoln	Great Britain	18.65	19.15	x	19.24	19.24	SB	2

- China withdrew from this event and were awarded 0 points.

==== Discus throw ====
14 July

Rank	Name	Nationality	#1	#2	#3	#4	Mark	Notes	Points
1st place, gold medalist(s)	Fedrick Dacres	Jamaica	64.00	65.32	x	x	65.32		8
2nd place, silver medalist(s)	Victor Hogan	South Africa	63.73	63.42	61.67	x	63.73		7
3rd place, bronze medalist(s)	Lolassonn Djouhan	France	62.56	63.48	x	61.89	63.48		6
4	Daniel Jasinski	Germany	59.80	60.31	63.17	61.59	63.17		5
5	Reggie Jager	United States	60.24	63.15	x	62.61	63.15		4
6	Piotr Małachowski	Poland	62.80	62.40	62.97	x	62.97		3
7	Brett Morse	Great Britain	56.52	57.49	59.72	58.77	59.72	SB	2

- China withdrew from this event and were awarded 0 points.

==== Hammer throw ====
15 July

Rank	Name	Nationality	#1	#2	#3	#4	Mark	Notes	Points
1st place, gold medalist(s)	Wojciech Nowicki	Poland	77.94	x	x	x	77.94		8
2nd place, silver medalist(s)	Nick Miller	Great Britain	73.43	x	76.14	x	76.14		7
3rd place, bronze medalist(s)	Quentin Bigot	France	72.30	73.52	74.69	74.98	74.98		6
4	Rudy Winkler	United States	69.62	71.72	71.61	70.68	71.72		5
5	Johannes Bichler	Germany	66.01	68.94	69.82	67.81	69.82		4
6	Tshepang Makhethe	South Africa	x	x	63.40	67.23	67.23		3
7	Cannigia Raynor	Jamaica	54.61	65.60	66.20	x	66.20	SB	2

- China withdrew from this event and were awarded 0 points.

==== Javelin throw ====
15 July

Rank	Name	Nationality	#1	#2	#3	#4	Mark	Notes	Points
1st place, gold medalist(s)	Julian Weber	Germany	82.80	78.77	73.45	74.32	82.80		8
2nd place, silver medalist(s)	Marcin Krukowski	Poland	78.56	80.23	78.78	80.25	80.25		7
3rd place, bronze medalist(s)	Curtis Thompson	United States	75.47	73.83	68.90	69.81	75.47		6
4	Johan Grobler	South Africa	74.26	74.22	73.45	x	74.26		5
5	James Whiteaker	Great Britain	65.49	73.90	72.08	66.79	73.90	SB	4
6	Orlando Thomas	Jamaica	67.44	69.73	67.89	70.60	70.60	SB	3
7	Jérémy Nicollin	France	64.45	63.69	x	65.93	65.93		2

- China withdrew from this event and were awarded 0 points.

=== Women ===
==== 100 metres ====
14 July

Rank	Lane	Name	Nationality	Time	Notes	Points
1st place, gold medalist(s)	3	Ashley Henderson	United States	11.07		8
2nd place, silver medalist(s)	2	Elaine Thompson	Jamaica	11.09		7
3rd place, bronze medalist(s)	7	Carina Horn	South Africa	11.21		6
4	4	Bianca Williams	Great Britain	11.25		5
5	8	Ewa Swoboda	Poland	11.28		4
6	5	Orlann Ombissa-Dzangue	France	11.28		3
7	6	Wei Yongli	China	11.32		2
8	1	Lisa-Marie Kwayie	Germany	11.46		1

==== 200 metres ====
15 July

Rank	Lane	Name	Nationality	Time	Notes	Points
1st place, gold medalist(s)	7	Shericka Jackson	Jamaica	22.35		8
2nd place, silver medalist(s)	6	Jenna Prandini	United States	22.45		7
3rd place, bronze medalist(s)	3	Beth Dobbin	Great Britain	22.95		6
4	8	Jessica-Bianca Wessolly	Germany	23.19		5
5	4	Anna Kiełbasińska	Poland	23.25	SB	4
6	1	Justine Palframan	South Africa	23.39		3
7	5	Jennifer Galais	France	23.52		2
8	2	Huang Guifen	China	23.76		1

==== 400 metres ====
14 July

Rank	Lane	Name	Nationality	Time	Notes	Points
1st place, gold medalist(s)	8	Stephenie Ann McPherson	Jamaica	50.98		8
2nd place, silver medalist(s)	7	Floria Gueï	France	51.84		7
3rd place, bronze medalist(s)	3	Justyna Święty-Ersetic	Poland	51.89		6
4	5	Anyika Onuora	Great Britain	52.03		5
5	6	Courtney Okolo	United States	52.09		4
6	4	Justine Palframan	South Africa	52.36		3
7	2	Lena Naumann	Germany	53.73		2

- China withdrew from this event and were awarded 0 points.

==== 800 metres ====
15 July

Rank	Lane	Name	Nationality	Time	Notes	Points
1st place, gold medalist(s)	5	Raevyn Rogers	United States	2:00.20		8
2nd place, silver medalist(s)	7	Adelle Tracey	Great Britain	2:01.05		7
3rd place, bronze medalist(s)	3	Simoya Campbell	Jamaica	2:01.59		6
4	6	Christina Hering	Germany	2:01.86		5
5	4	Anna Sabat	Poland	2:02.93		4
6	2	Leila Boufaarirane	France	2:06.06		3
7	8	Gena Löfstrand	South Africa	2:10.42		2

- China withdrew from this event and were awarded 0 points.

==== 1500 metres ====
14 July

Rank	Order	Name	Nationality	Time	Notes	Points
1st place, gold medalist(s)	2	Sofia Ennaoui	Poland	4:07.66		8
2nd place, silver medalist(s)	3	Rachel Schneider	United States	4:08.04	SB	7
3rd place, bronze medalist(s)	7	Jemma Reekie	Great Britain	4:09.05	PB	6
4	4	Caterina Granz	Germany	4:10.04		5
5	6	Ophélie Claude-Boxberger	France	4:18.21		4
6	1	Carina Viljoen	South Africa	4:29.57		3
	5	Simoya Campbell	Jamaica	DNS		0

- China withdrew from this event and were awarded 0 points.

==== 100 metres hurdles ====
15 July

Rank	Lane	Name	Nationality	Time	Notes	Points
1st place, gold medalist(s)	4	Rikenette Steenkamp	South Africa	12.88		8
2nd place, silver medalist(s)	1	Jeanine Williams	Jamaica	12.95		7
3rd place, bronze medalist(s)	6	Queen Harrison	United States	12.99		6
4	3	Solene Ndama	France	13.02	PB	5
5	7	Karolina Kołeczek	Poland	13.09		4
6	5	Nadine Hilderbrand	Germany	13.25		3
7	8	Megan Marrs	Great Britain	13.36		2
	2	Wui Shuijiao	China	DNS		0

==== 400 metres hurdles ====
14 July

Rank	Lane	Name	Nationality	Time	Notes	Points
1st place, gold medalist(s)	3	Janieve Russell	Jamaica	55.10		8
2nd place, silver medalist(s)	4	Meghan Beesley	Great Britain	55.90		7
3rd place, bronze medalist(s)	7	Aurélie Chaboudez	France	56.23	SB	6
4	6	Wenda Nel	South Africa	56.36		5
5	5	Kymber Payne	United States	56.41		4
6	2	Joanna Linkiewicz	Poland	56.83		3
7	8	Djamila Böhm	Germany	57.88		2

- China withdrew from this event and were awarded 0 points.

==== 4 × 100 metres relay ====
15 July

Rank	Lane	Names	Nationality	Time	Notes	Points
1st place, gold medalist(s)	7	Asha Philip; Imani Lansiquot; Bianca Williams; Shannon Hylton	Great Britain	42.52		8
2nd place, silver medalist(s)	4	Shelly-Ann Fraser-Pryce; Shericka Jackson; Jonielle Smith; Tissanna Hickling	Jamaica	42.60		7
3rd place, bronze medalist(s)	1	Liang Xiaojing; Wei Yongli; Ge Manqi; Yuan Qiqi	China	42.94	SB	6
4	5	Lisa Marie Kwayie; Alexandra Burghardt; Jessica-Bianca Wessolly; Jennifer Montag	Germany	43.04		5
5	6	Estelle Raffai; Stella Akakpo; Jennifer Galais; Amandine Brossier	France	43.34		4
6	8	Rikenette Steenkamp; Tebogo Mamatu; Tamzin Thomas; Carina Horn	South Africa	43.68		3
7	2	Kamila Ciba; Agata Forkasiewicz; Anna Kiełbasińska; Ewa Swoboda	Poland	43.82		2
	3	Mikiah Briscoe; Aaliyah Brown; Dezerea Bryant; Ashley Henderson	United States	DNF		0

==== 4 × 400 metres relay ====
14 July

Rank	Lane	Names	Nationality	Time	Notes	Points
1st place, gold medalist(s)	7	Brionna Thomas; Jasmine Blocker; Kiana Horton; Courtney Okolo	United States	3:24.28	SB	8
2nd place, silver medalist(s)	3	Christine Day; Janieve Russell; Tiffany James; Stephenie Ann McPherson	Jamaica	3:24.29		7
3rd place, bronze medalist(s)	4	Elea-Mariama Diarra; Déborah Sananes; Cynthia Anaïs; Floria Gueï	France	3:25.91	SB	6
4	5	Małgorzata Hołub-Kowalik; Patrycja Wyciszkiewicz; Martyna Dąbrowska; Iga Baumgart	Poland	3:26.17	SB	5
5	6	Zoey Clark; Amy Allcock; Finette Agyapong; Emily Diamond	Great Britain	3:26.48	SB	4
6	8	Laura Marx; Alena Gerken; Svea Köhrbrück; Nelly Schmidt	Germany	3:35.15		3
7	2	Justine Palframan; Gena Löfstrand; Ariane Nel; Wenda Nel	South Africa	3:43.35		2

- China withdrew from this event and were awarded 0 points.

==== High jump ====
15 July

Rank	Name	Nationality	1.71	1.75	1.79	1.83	1.87	1.90	1.93	1.96	1.99	2.00	Mark	Notes	Points
1st place, gold medalist(s)	Vashti Cunningham	United States	–	–	o	o	o	o	xo	o	x-	x	1.96	SB	8
2nd place, silver medalist(s)	Morgan Lake	Great Britain	–	–	–	xo	o	x-	xo	x-	xx		1.93		7
3rd place, bronze medalist(s)	Prisca Duvernay	France	o	o	xo	xo	xxx						1.83		6
4	Jossie Graumann	Germany	o	o	o	xxo	xxx						1.83		5
5	Paulina Borys	Poland	o	o	xo	xxx							1.79		4
6	Saniel Atkinson-Grier	Jamaica	o	xo	xxx								1.75		3
7	Julia du Plessis	South Africa	o	xxo	xxx								1.75		2

- China withdrew from this event and were awarded 0 points.

==== Pole vault ====
14 July

Rank	Name	Nationality	3.65	4.05	4.25	4.40	4.50	4.60	4.68	4.75	4.82	Mark	Notes	Points
1st place, gold medalist(s)	Holly Bradshaw	Great Britain	–	–	–	–	o	o	o	o	r	4.75	SB	8
2nd place, silver medalist(s)	Katie Nageotte	United States	–	–	–	–	o	o	o	xxx		4.68		7
3rd place, bronze medalist(s)	Ninon Guillon-Romarin	France	–	–	–	o	o	xo	xo	xxx		4.68		6
4	Jacqueline Otchere	Germany	–	o	xo	xo	xxo	o	xxx			4.60	PB	5
5	Li Ling	China	–	–	xo	o	xo	xo	xxx			4.60	SB	4
6	Justyna Śmietanka	Poland	–	o	o	o	xxx					4.40		3
7	Sophie Cook	Great Britain	–	o	xxx							4.05		-
	Christy Nell	South Africa	xxx									NM		0

- Jamaica withdrew from the competition in this event. They received 0 points.
- Sophie Cook of Great Britain was entered as a non-scoring athlete (i.e. she did not gain any points for Great Britain and Northern Ireland, though she was eligible for individual awards).

==== Long jump ====
14 July

Rank	Name	Nationality	#1	#2	#3	#4	Mark	Notes	Points
1st place, gold medalist(s)	Lorraine Ugen	Great Britain	6.35	6.86	6.42	x	6.86		8
2nd place, silver medalist(s)	Quanesha Burks	United States	6.13	6.36	6.48	6.12	6.48		7
3rd place, bronze medalist(s)	Tissanna Hickling	Jamaica	6.39	6.34	6.47	4.85	6.47		6
4	Lu Minjia	China	6.29	6.29	6.31	6.45	6.45	SB	5
5	Rougui Sow	France	6.35	6.28	6.14	6.25	6.35		4
6	Alexandra Wester	Germany	x	6.00	6.30	6.28	6.30		3
7	Magdalena Żebrowska	Poland	6.09	6.12	x	5.97	6.12		2
8	Lynique Beneke	South Africa	6.08	x	4.92	6.10	6.10		1

==== Triple jump ====
15 July

Rank	Name	Nationality	#1	#2	#3	#4	Mark	Notes	Points
1st place, gold medalist(s)	Shanieka Ricketts	Jamaica	14.29	14.29	14.61	14.57	14.61	PB	8
2nd place, silver medalist(s)	Keturah Orji	United States	14.21	14.51	14.60	14.40	14.60		7
3rd place, bronze medalist(s)	Anna Jagaciak-Michalska	Poland	14.08	12.48	x	13.69	14.08	SB	6
4	Jeanine Assani Issouf	France	13.60	13.97	13.67	13.98	13.98		5
5	Jessie Maduka	Germany	13.95	x	–	13.71	13.95	PB	4
6	Naomi Ogbeta	Great Britain	13.11	13.48	13.29	x	13.48		3
7	Patience Ntshingila	South Africa	11.56	x	x	x	11.56		2

- China withdrew from this event and were awarded 0 points.

==== Shot put ====
15 July

Rank	Name	Nationality	#1	#2	#3	#4	Mark	Notes	Points
1st place, gold medalist(s)	Gong Lijiao	China	18.92	19.53	19.35	19.90	19.90		8
2nd place, silver medalist(s)	Paulina Guba	Poland	18.30	18.60	19.29	18.82	19.29		7
3rd place, bronze medalist(s)	Maggie Ewen	United States	18.23	17.64	x	17.71	18.23		6
4	Ischke Senekal	South Africa	x	16.17	17.54	16.79	17.54		5
5	Amelia Strickler	Great Britain	17.09	17.12	x	17.09	17.12		4
6	Lloydrickia Cameron	Jamaica	16.91	16.70	16.78	16.76	16.91		3
7	Sarah Schmidt	Germany	x	16.85	16.72	16.63	16.85		2
8	Jessica Cérival	France	13.99	15.60	15.63	16.00	16.00		1

==== Discus throw ====
15 July

Rank	Name	Nationality	#1	#2	#3	#4	Mark	Notes	Points
1st place, gold medalist(s)	Claudine Vita	Germany	x	62.92	60.45	x	62.92		8
2nd place, silver medalist(s)	Su Xinyue	China	56.72	58.76	62.62	58.53	62.62		7
3rd place, bronze medalist(s)	Valarie Allman	United States	61.10	54.69	59.52	58.20	61.10		6
4	Jade Lally	Great Britain	55.45	58.92	56.85	x	58.92		5
5	Daria Zabawska	Poland	53.88	55.33	56.97	x	56.97		4
6	Melanie Pingeon	France	52.84	55.85	53.82	52.99	55.85		3
7	Ischke Senekal	South Africa	55.54	54.90	x	54.30	55.54		2
	Shadae Lawrence	Jamaica	x	x	x	x	NM		0

==== Hammer throw ====
14 July

Rank	Name	Nationality	#1	#2	#3	#4	Mark	Notes	Points
1st place, gold medalist(s)	Anita Włodarczyk	Poland	72.78	75.77	78.74	76.61	78.74	WL	8
2nd place, silver medalist(s)	Sophie Hitchon	Great Britain	71.96	73.48	x	x	73.48	SB	7
3rd place, bronze medalist(s)	Alexandra Tavernier	France	70.11	67.99	73.38	71.57	73.38		6
4	Lou Na	China	67.25	68.10	68.27	x	68.27		5
5	Kathrin Klaas	Germany	x	64.52	63.57	66.61	66.61		4
6	DeAnna Price	United States	x	64.82	x	x	64.82		3
7	Margo Chene Pretorius	South Africa	58.78	x	56.07	59.14	59.14	PB	2
8	Nyoka Clunis	Jamaica	53.16	54.99	56.36	x	56.36		1

==== Javelin throw ====
14 July

Rank	Name	Nationality	#1	#2	#3	#4	Mark	Notes	Points
1st place, gold medalist(s)	Sunette Viljoen	South Africa	58.24	60.12	59.75	61.69	61.69		8
2nd place, silver medalist(s)	Kara Winger	United States	60.75	60.07	x	58.73	60.75		7
3rd place, bronze medalist(s)	Lyu Huihui	China	59.82	x	60.40	59.63	60.40		6
4	Katharina Molitor	Germany	58.03	56.05	x	x	58.03		5
5	Alexie Alaïs	France	51.85	53.36	x	50.61	53.36		4
6	Laura Whittingham	Great Britain	49.60	49.70	51.74	51.21	51.74		3
7	Marcelina Witek	Poland	50.07	x	x	x	50.07		2
8	Kateema Riettie	Jamaica	47.21	43.74	x	44.10	47.21		1

== See also ==
- World Athletics Continental Cup
