= 2010 Finnish Athletics Championships =

Following are the results of the 2010 Finnish Athletics Championships. The games, known as Kalevan kisat in Finnish, were first held in Tampere in 1907. The 2010 events were held August 5 through 8th in Kajaani.

== Results ==
Event	Men's Track Winners		Women's Track Winners	
Event	Name	Mark	Name	Mark
100 metres August 1	Joni Rautanen	10,66	Sari Keskitalo	12,02
200 metres August 2	Jonathan Åstrand	20,98	Anna Hämäläinen	24,34
400 metres August 1	Matti Välimäki	46,89	Ella Räsänen	54,44
800 metres August 2	Mikko Lahtio	1.51,34	Mari Järvenpää	2.06,79
1,500 metres August 1	Niclas Sandells	3.43,48	Sandra Eriksson	4.25,34
5,000 metres August 2 – July 31	Matti Räsänen	13.53,87	Sandra Eriksson	17.07,05
10,000 metres July 31 – August 2	Matti Räsänen	29.24,45	Laura Markovaara	34.42,94
110 m/100m Hurdles; July 31	Antti Korkealaakso	13,88	Ida Aidanpää	13,62
400m Hurdles; August 2	Petteri Monni	51,26	Ilona Ranta	57,00
3,000 m Steeplechase; July 31 – August 2	Janne Ukonmaanaho	8.46,67	Sandra Eriksson	10.05,02
20 km/10 km Race Walk; July 31	Antti Kempas	1.29.20	Anne Halkivaha	51.22
Event	Men's Field Winners		Women's Field Winners	
Event	Name	Mark	Name	Mark
High Jump; August 2 – July 31	Osku Torro	2.24 m	Maiju Mattila	1.85 m
Pole Vault; August 1 – August 2	Jere Bergius	5.50 m	Minna Nikkanen	4.40 m
Long Jump; August 1	Tommi Evilä	7.86 m	Elina Torro	6.19 m
Triple Jump; August 2	Aleksi Tammentie	15.80 m	Elina Torro	13.30 m
Shot Put; July 31 – August 2	Robert Häggblom	18.91 m	Suvi Helin	15.38 m
Discus Throw; August 2	Frantz Kruger	61.10 m	Tanja Komulainen	56.38 m
Hammer Throw; July 31 – August 1	Olli-Pekka Karjalainen	75.20 m	Merja Korpela	66.94 m
Javelin Throw; August 2 – August 1	Tero Pitkämäki	85.19 m	Sanni Utriainen	56.29 m
Decathlon; August 1 – August 2	Lassi Raunio	7679	—	—
Heptathlon; July 31 – August 1	—	—	Niina Kelo	5719
