= List of 2009 Canada Summer Games medallists =

This is a list of events and medallists at the 2009 Canada Games.

== Athletics ==
=== Men's ===
Event	Gold		Silver		Bronze	
100m	(Alberta) Akeem Haynes	10.47	(Ontario) Tyrone Halstead	10.62	(Ontario) Carlisle Stanford	10.77
100m SOC	(British Columbia) Glen Ross McIntyre	12.27	(Ontario) Kyle Edward Whitehouse	12.36	(Quebec) Matthieu Besnier	12.65
200m	(Alberta) Sam Effah	20.65	(Ontario) Daniel Harper	20.92	(Ontario) Tyrone Halstead	21.03
200m SOC	(Ontario) Kyle Edward Whitehouse	25.38	(Quebec) Matthieu Besnier	26.35	(Alberta) Ryan Dowling	27.52
200m Wheelchair	(Quebec) Alexandre Dupont	27.83	(Ontario) Isaiah W Christophe	28.78	(Ontario) Ian Van Heteren	32.11
400m	(Ontario) Daniel Harper	47.15	(Manitoba) Quin Ferguson	47.32	(Ontario) Andre Hamilton	47.37
400m Wheelchair	(Quebec) Alexandre Dupont	53.83	(Ontario) Isaiah W Christophe	55.41	(Ontario) Mike Kahn	55.53
800m	(Nova Scotia) Geoff Harris	1:50.59	(Quebec) Olivier Collin	1:50.93	(Quebec) Tommy Lecours	1:50.94
1500m	(British Columbia) Cameron Levins	3:49.34	(Ontario) Matt Walters	3:52.23	(Quebec) Olivier Bernard	3:52.95
1500m Wheelchair	(Quebec) Alexandre Dupont	3:39.10	(Saskatchewan) Kyle Shaw	3:41.50	(Ontario) Isaiah W Christophe	3:50.81
110m Hurdles	(Quebec) Simon Léveillé	14.38	(Nova Scotia) Chris Theriau	14.42	(Quebec) Gabriel El Hanbli	14.47
400m Hurdles	(Ontario) Stuart Pearson	55.12	(Quebec) Vincent Parent-Pichette	56.95	(Alberta) Mihai Prajea	57.39
3000m Steeplechase	(Ontario) Matt Brunsting	9:14.46	(Newfoundland and Labrador) Ryan Brockerville	9:20.65	(Nova Scotia) Mattias Wolter	9:25.31
5000m	(British Columbia) Cameron Levins	14:23.01	(Quebec) Stéphane Colle	14:27.26	(Ontario) Matt Brunsting	14:35.57
4 × 100 m	Alberta	41.37m	British Columbia	41.77	Quebec	41.95
4 × 400 m	Ontario	3.13.29	Alberta	3.14.53	British Columbia	3.15.11
Long Jump	(Ontario) Kadeem Douglas	7.41m	(Quebec) Christopher Greenaway	7.36m	(Ontario) Nate Labbe	7.24m
Triple Jump	(Ontario) Taylor Stewart	15.05m	(Ontario) Jacob Zorzella	14.95m	(Prince Edward Island) Kurt McCormack	14.93m
High Jump	(British Columbia) Paul Little	2.14m	(British Columbia) Django Lovett	2.11m	(Ontario) Jharyl Bowry	2.00m
Pole Vault	(Saskatchewan) Taylor Petrucha	4.75m	(Alberta) Deryk Theodore	4.55m	(British Columbia) David McKay	4.55m
Shot Put	(Saskatchewan) Andrew Smith	17.14m	(Saskatchewan) Justin Greif	16.03m	(Ontario) Umar Khan	15.15m
Javelin	(British Columbia) Kyle Nielsen	72.90m	(British Columbia) Curtis Moss	70.40m	(Saskatchewan) Geoff Peet	65.90
Discus	(Nova Scotia) Geoff Myatt	49.41m	(British Columbia) Angus Taylor	47.27m	(Ontario) Pat Arbour	46.07m
Hammer	(Prince Edward Island) Matthew Caseley	56.55m	(British Columbia) Angus Taylor	55.88m	(British Columbia) Nolan Henderson	55.80m
Decathlon	(British Columbia) Reid Gustavson	6,551	(British Columbia) Mark Chenery	6,513	(Saskatchewan) Keegan Sharp	6,413

=== Women's ===
Event	Gold		Silver		Bronze	
100m	(Alberta) Loudia Laarman	11.82	(Ontario) Noelle Marie Montcalm	11.82	(Manitoba) Chantal Grant	12.04
100m SOC	(Ontario) Catherine Partlow	12.65	(Saskatchewan) Lauren Weigel	14.43	(Ontario) Reisha Baxter	14.46
200m	(Ontario) Noelle Marie Montcalm	24.02	(Alberta) Karlene Hurrel	24.72	(Saskatchewan) Sharai Siemens	25.02
200m SOC	(Ontario) Catherine Partlow	28.32	(Saskatchewan) Lauren Weigel	29.74	(Ontario) Reisha Baxter	29.79
200m Wheelchair	(Saskatchewan) Keira Frie	34.12	(Ontario) Kierra Gibson	39.83	(Quebec) Sarah Mailhot	40.07
400m	(Ontario) Kate Ruediger	54.59	(Manitoba) Carly Paracholski	54.95	(British Columbia) Katie Reid	55.14
400m Wheelchair	(Saskatchewan) Keira Frie	1:07:49	(Quebec) Sarah Mailhot	1:17.00	(Quebec) Sara White	1:19.82
800m	(Alberta) Dawn Nagazina	2:09.04	(Quebec) Annie Leblanc	2:09:93	(Nova Scotia) Celia Peters	2:11.06
1500m	(Alberta) Jessica O'Connell	4:28.09	(Ontario) Jillian Wyman	4:32.01	(Saskatchewan) Jodi Souter	4:33.31
1500m Wheelchair	(Saskatchewan) Keira Frie	4:35.17	(Quebec) Sara White	5:09.66	(Saskatchewan) Cory Harrower	5:09.76
100m Hurdles	(Ontario) Noelle Montcalm	13.85	(British Columbia) Natasha Miller	14.28	(Quebec) Laurence Beaudet	14.29
400m Hurdles	(Ontario) Emilie Halle	1:01.44	(Saskatchewan) Michelle Young	1:01.62	(Alberta) Kayti Simonson	1:02.23
2000m Steeplechase	(Saskatchewan) Jessica Furlan	6:50.73	(Quebec) Valérie Bélanger	6:53.71	(Manitoba) Melanie Gregoire	7:04.48
5000m	(Alberta) Jessica O'Connell	16:39.33	(Quebec) Valérie Bélanger	16:56.78	(British Columbia) Rachel Lorraine Cliff	16:59.79
4 × 100 m	Alberta	46.31	British Columbia	46.86	Manitoba	47.03
4 × 400 m	British Columbia	3.44.17	Alberta	3.44.21	Ontario	3:45.70
Long Jump	(Ontario) Jen Cotten	5.89m	(Quebec) Laurence Beaudet	5.88m	(British Columbia) Aleisha Cobb	5.81m
Triple Jump	(Ontario) Neb Zachariah	12.40m	(Ontario) Alicia Smith	11.78m	(Alberta) Courtney Wilkes	11.63m
High Jump	(British Columbia) Holly Parent	1.71m	(British Columbia) Natasha Miller	1.71m	(Nova Scotia) Laura Maessen	1.71m
Pole Vault	(Quebec) Ariane Beaumont-Courteau	4.00m	(Quebec) Gabriella Duclos-Lasnier	3.90m	(Saskatchewan) Leah Vause	3.90m
Shot Put	(Quebec) Julie Labonté	16.23m	(Ontario) Kaitlyn Andrews	13.79m	(Nova Scotia) Chelsea Whalen	13.71m
Javelin	(British Columbia) Elizabeth Gleadle	56.16m	(British Columbia) Brooke Pighin	48.96m	(Ontario) Alanna Kovacs	47.51m
Discus	(Quebec) Isabelle Boudreau	47.08m	(Quebec) Myriam Dumont-Breton	46.70m	(Ontario) Kaitlyn Andrews	43.91m
Hammer	(Alberta) Heather Steacy	59.92m	(Quebec) Annie Larose	53.62m	(Ontario) Kristin Obrochta	52.89m
Heptathlon	(Ontario) Jen Cotten	5,144	(Saskatchewan) Chelsea Valois	4,944	(Nova Scotia) Rachael McIntosh	4,883

== Baseball ==
Event	Gold	Silver	Bronze
Men's	Quebec	Alberta	Ontario

== Basketball ==
Event	Gold	Silver	Bronze
Men's	Quebec	Nova Scotia	Ontario
Women's	Alberta	British Columbia	Ontario

== Beach Volleyball ==
Event	Gold	Silver	Bronze
Men's	Ontario	Quebec	British Columbia
Women's	British Columbia	Alberta	Ontario

== Canoe/Kayak ==
=== Men's ===
==== Canoe ====
Event	Gold		Silver		Bronze	
200m C-1	(Nova Scotia) Jason McCoombs	48.564	(Ontario) Jared Trafford	50.556	(Manitoba) Andri Shchudlo	51.060
500m C-1	(Nova Scotia) Jason McCoombs	1:57.731	(Quebec) Antoine Meunier	1:58.765	(Ontario) Dustin Shaw	2:00.225
1000m C-1	(Quebec) Marc Tarling	5:39.359	(Ontario) Roland Varga	5:45.974	(Manitoba) Andri Shchudlo	5:49.964
2000m C-1	(Nova Scotia) Mark James	11:20.530	(Manitoba) Andri Shchudlo	11:28.820	(British Columbia) Sean McBeath	11:49.929
200m C-2	Nova Scotia	48.630	Ontario	49.878	Saskatchewan	51.498
500m C-2	Nova Scotia	1:59.431	Ontario	2:01.479	Saskatchewan	2:02.577
1000m C-2	Nova Scotia	4:44.890	Ontario	4:46.932	Saskatchewan	5:01.858
2000m C-2	Nova Scotia	10:02.591	Ontario	10:13.847	Quebec	10:16.851
1000m IC-4	Nova Scotia	4:09.663	Ontario	4:11.453	Quebec	4:16.416

==== Kayak ====
Event	Gold		Silver		Bronze	
200m K-1	(Quebec) Hugues Fournel	40.864	(Ontario) Geoffery Clarke	41.774	(Nova Scotia) Shaun Fair	42.076
500m K-1	(Quebec) Hugues Fournel	1:44.314	(Ontario) Chris Mehak	1:45.500	(Nova Scotia) Andrew Jessop	1:46.008
1000m K-1	(Nova Scotia) Neil Lang	4:28.852	(Quebec) Frédéric Bettez	4:32.402	(Ontario) Chris Mehak	4:35.904
2000m K-1	(Nova Scotia) Shaun Fair	9:34.069	(Ontario) Chris Mehak	9:36.959	(Quebec) Philippe Duchesneau	9:39.157
200m K-2	Quebec	40.058	Ontario	40.928	Saskatchewan	43.638
500m K-2	Quebec	1:40.199	Ontario	1:40.883	Nova Scotia	1:40.913
1000m K-2	Quebec	4:09.746	Ontario	4:16.447	Saskatchewan	4:21.359
2000m K-2	Nova Scotia	8:29.975	Ontario	8:44.053	British Columbia	4:21.359
1000m K-4	Nova Scotia	3:31.828	Quebec	3:32.086	Ontario	3:43.873

=== Women's ===
==== Canoe ====
Event	Gold		Silver		Bronze	
200m C-1	(British Columbia) Nicole Haywood	1:00.771	(Nova Scotia) Jenna Marks	1:03.361	(Quebec) Laurence Vincent-Lapointe	1:06.085
500m C-1	(British Columbia) Nicole Haywood	2:16.142	(Quebec) Laurence Vincent-Lapointe	2:17.770	(Nova Scotia) Jenna Marks	2:21.532
1000m C-1	(Ontario) Rachel Marcuson	6:27.801	(British Columbia) Nicole Haywood	7:16.184	(Nova Scotia) Jenna Marks	7:19.096
2000m C-1	(Ontario) Rachel Marcuson	13:52.166	(Alberta) Penny Jalkotzy	17:05.410	DNF	
200m C-2	Nova Scotia	1:01.754	Ontario	1:04.286	Saskatchewan	1:04.573
500m C-2	Nova Scotia	2:14.892	Ontario	2:21.644	British Columbia	2:22.364
1000m C-2	Nova Scotia	5:52.034	Quebec	6:13.196	Ontario	6:17.602
2000m C-2	Quebec	13:16.446	British Columbia	14:15.184	Alberta	15:26.449

==== Kayak ====
Event	Gold		Silver		Bronze	
200m K-1	(Nova Scotia) Erika Touras	50.467	(Quebec) Marie-Pier Langois	50.675	(Ontario) Tessa Oldershaw	50.799
500m K-1	(Saskatchewan) Trista Neilly	1:58.544	(Ontario) Lizzy Bates	1:58.916	(Nova Scotia) Hannah Vaughan	2:01.326
1000m K-1	(Saskatchewan) Trista Neilly	5:10.300	(Nova Scotia) Michelle Russell	5:15.970	(Quebec) Pierre-Marie Langois	5:19.382
2000m K-1	(Saskatchewan) Trista Neilly	10:57.393	(Nova Scotia) Michelle Russell	11:05.493	(Ontario) Lizzy Bates	11:17.199
200m K-2	Saskatchewan	47.869	Alberta	49.161	Ontario	49.319
500m K-2	Nova Scotia	1:50.651	Quebec	1:51.437	Saskatchewan	1:51.721
1000m K-2	Nova Scotia	4:43.476	Quebec	4:49.123	British Columbia	4:53.035
2000m K-2	Nova Scotia	9:29.872	Quebec	9:45.523	British Columbia	9:48.823
500m K-4	Nova Scotia	1:47.572	Quebec	1:48.264	Ontario	1:50.696

== Cycling ==
Event	Gold		Silver		Bronze	
Individual Time Trial Men's	(British Columbia) Owen Harrison	29:32.00	(Quebec) Guillaume Boivin	30:02.00	(Quebec) Hugo Houle	30:30.13
Individual Time Trial Women's	(Ontario) Denise Ramsden	20:11.00	(British Columbia) Gillian Carleton	20:20.00	(Quebec) Karol-Ann Canuel	20:22.00
Road Race Men's	(Quebec) Éric Boily	2:51:26.00	(Ontario) Bryson Bowers	2:51:30.00	(Ontario) Devon Novakowski	2:51:30.00
Road Race Women's	(Alberta) Caeli Barron	2:05:22.00	(Alberta) Sam Grover	2:05:22.00	(Ontario) Laura Bietola	2:05:22.00
Criterium Men's	(Quebec) Hugo Houle	1	(Quebec) Éric Boily	2	(Quebec) David Boily	3
Criterium Women's	(Manitoba) Leah Kirchmann	1	(Manitoba) Karlee Gendron	2	(Quebec) Karol-Ann Canuel	3
Mountain Bike Cross-Country Men's	(Quebec) Raphaël Gagné	1:36:25.00	(British Columbia) Evan Guthrie	1:37:16.00	(Quebec) Léni Trudel	1:38:04.00
Mountain Bike Cross-Country Women's	(Ontario) Mikaela Kofman	1:22:45.00	(Quebec) Rébecca Beaumont	1:24:27.00	(Quebec) Marie-Claude Surprenant	1:25:57.00

== Diving ==
Event	Gold		Silver		Bronze	
Springboard 1 Metre Men's	(Alberta) Brandon Makinson	368.25	(Quebec) François Imbeau-Dulac	357.95	(Quebec) Maxime Morneau-Ricard	356.80
Springboard 1 Metre Women's	(Alberta) Hailey Casper	290.55	(Quebec) Myriam Selmani	265.70	(British Columbia) Éloise Bélanger	261.25
Springboard 3 Metre Men's	(Quebec) François Imbeau-Dulac	438.20	(Alberta) Cody Kolodziejzyk	411.90	(Quebec) Maxime Morneau-Ricard	389.40
Springboard 3 Metre Women's	(Quebec) Pamela Ware	307.00	(Ontario) Celina Toth	295.55	(Quebec) Myriam Selmani	290.20
Springboard 3 Metre Synchro Men's	Alberta	369.75	Quebec A	359.10	Quebec B	349.05
Springboard 3 Metre Synchro Women's	Quebec A	285.33	Quebec B	277.41	British Columbia	263.52
Platform 10 Metre Men's	(Quebec) François Imbeau-Dulac	385.70	(British Columbia) Shane Miszkiel	360.20	(Quebec) Marc Sabourin-Germain	349.65
Platform 10 Metre Women's	(Quebec) Pamela Ware	325.20	(Quebec) Carol-Ann Ware	318.50	(Quebec) Myriam Selmani	310.25

== Golf ==
Event	Gold	Silver	Bronze
Team Men's	British Columbia	Quebec	Ontario
Team Women's	British Columbia	Ontario	Quebec
Individual Men's	(British Columbia) Eugene Wong	(British Columbia) Justin Shin	(Quebec) Julien Goulet
Individual Women's	(British Columbia) Sue Kim	(Ontario) Augusta James	(British Columbia) SooBin Kim

== Rowing ==
Event	Gold	Silver	Bronze
Lightweight Four (L4-) Male	Ontario	British Columbia	Alberta
Single Scull (1x) Male	(Ontario) David Wakulich	(Quebec) Marc-Antoine Provost-Dourekas	(Saskatchewan) Lucas Baldo
Pair (2-) Female	Saskatchewan	British Columbia	Ontario
Pair (2-) Male	British Columbia	New Brunswick	Ontario
Quadruple Scull (4x) Male	Ontario	British Columbia	Quebec
Eight with coxswain (8+) Female	(Ontario) Sarah Kathleen Black, Mariel Anneke Boomgaardt, Cheryl Ann Copson, Laura Cowal, Emma Dirks, Britt Ellis, Kristin Falovo, Sam Kayser, Natalie Alexandra Mastracci	British Columbia	Saskatchewan
Quadruple Scull (4x) Female	Ontario	British Columbia	Saskatchewan
Lightweight Double Scull (L2x)Female	(Ontario) Allisha Lynn Campaigne & Alex Meiklejohn	(British Columbia) Elizabeth Ann Fenje & Patricia Susan Obee	(Saskatchewan) Avril Bissonnette & Catherine Bouchard-Pilote
Single Scull (1x)Female	(Manitoba) Claudia Blandford	(Ontario) Laura Cowal	(British Columbia) Lauren Wilkinson
Women's Four	(British Columbia) Sarah Elizabeth Aylard, Kaitlyn Dick, Lisa Carrie Elizabeth Roman, Antje Von Seydlitz-Kurzbach	(Ontario) Sarah Kathleen Black, Kristin Falovo, Natalie Alexandra Mastracci, Stephanie Mowder	(Newfoundland and Labrador) Jane Brodie, Steph Davis, Allison DeLong, Alyssa Devereaux

== Rugby ==
Event	Gold	Silver	Bronze
Men's	(Ontario) Tyler Ardron, Matthew Alexander Kelly, Scott Peter MacDonald, Cody MacLeod, Graeme John Mahar, Brandon Wade Marsden, Aaron Milton, Matthew Mufandaezdra, Dylan Alexander Mundy, Ade Ojo, Robert Jacoby Paris, Brandon Black, Taylor Paris, Luc Pearson, Ryan Scarborough, Davor Stojanov, Liam Underwood, Geoff Warburton, David Thomas Croxall, Edward Donnelly, Andrew Michael Ferguson, Conor Fitzsimmons, Kurt Gibbons, Andrew Stanford Holt, Lucas Walter Hoppe	(British Columbia)	(Newfoundland and Labrador)

== Sailing ==
Event	Gold	Silver	Bronze
Men's Single-Handed Laser	(British Columbia) Kevin Grierson	(Nova Scotia) Tom Brosky	(Ontario) Evert McLaughlin
Women's Single-Handed Laser	(British Columbia) Isabella Bertold	(Nova Scotia) Erin Rafues	(Ontario) Joanne Prokop
Men's Double-Handed 29er	Nova Scotia	Ontario	British Columbia
Women's Double-Handed 29er	Ontario	Nova Scotia	Quebec

== Soccer ==
Event	Gold	Silver	Bronze
Men's	Quebec	Alberta	Ontario
Women's	British Columbia	Quebec	Ontario

== Softball ==
Event	Gold	Silver	Bronze
Women's	British Columbia	Ontario	Quebec

== Swimming ==
=== Men's events ===
Event	Gold		Silver		Bronze	
50 m freestyle	(British Columbia) Charles Tapp	22.03	(Ontario) Hassaan Abdel Khalik	22.17	(Alberta) Kyle Troskot	22.37
50 m freestyle SOC	(Ontario) Mike Heath	26.04	(British Columbia) Adam Rahier	26.28	(Ontario) Alex Buehlow	27.18
50 m freestyle SWAD	(Ontario) Christopher Tsonos-Sergeant	32.75	(Quebec) Marc-Olivier Marchand	33.86	(Ontario) Iain Smith	38.42
100 m freestyle	(Ontario) Hassaan Abdel Khalik	48.16	(Quebec) Dominique Massie-Martel	48.90	(British Columbia) Charles Tapp	49.06
100 m freestyle SOC	(British Columbia) Adam Rahier	56.51	(Ontario) Mike Heath	56.71	(Ontario) Alex Buehlow	56.83
100 m freestyle SWAD	(Alberta) Zack McAllister	1:05.74	(Ontario) Christopher Tsonos-Sergeant	1:12.15	(Quebec) Marc-Olivier Marchand	1:12.18
200 m freestyle	(Ontario) Hassaan Abdel Khalik	1:45.75	(British Columbia) Mathew Godbeer	1:47.34	(Quebec) Dominique Massie-Martel	1:47.36
400 m freestyle	(Ontario) Hassaan Abdel Khalik	3:46.66	(British Columbia) Jeremy Bagshaw	3:47.94	(Ontario) Aimeson King	3:48.61
800 m freestyle	(British Columbia) Richard Weinberger	7:50.40	(British Columbia) Craig Dagnall	7:50.47	(Ontario) Aimeson King	7:52.37
1500 m freestyle	(Ontario) Hassaan Abdel Khalik	15:01.43	(British Columbia) Craig Dagnall	15:01.94	(Ontario) Aimeson King	15:06.90
50 m backstroke	(Ontario) Nick Karpov	25.40	(Nova Scotia) David Sharpe	25.41	(British Columbia) Charles Tapp	25.93
50 m backstroke SOC	(British Columbia) Adam Rahier	29.81	(Ontario) Alex Buehlow	30.72	(Ontario) Mike Heath	31.69
100 m backstroke	(Nova Scotia) David Sharpe	53.91	(Ontario) Nick Karpov	54.13	(British Columbia) Nicholas Sinclair	54.61
100 m backstroke SOC	(British Columbia) Adam Rahier	1:04.62	(Ontario) Alex Buehlow	1:05.07	(Ontario) Mike Heath	1:08.07
100 m backstroke SWAD	(Alberta) Zack McAllister	1:17.63	(Ontario) Christopher Tsonos-Sergeant	1:21.74	(British Columbia) Kyle McMahon	1:27.54
200 m backstroke	(British Columbia) Nicholas Sinclair	1:55.09	(Ontario) Nick Karpov	1:55.68	(Quebec) Pascal-Hugo Cantin	1:57.93
50 m breaststroke	(British Columbia) Michael Xiaohang Cai	28.20	(Ontario) Trevor Nicholas	28.49	(British Columbia) Davis Wuolle	28.63
50 m breaststroke SOC	(Ontario) Mike Heath	33.19	(British Columbia) Adam Dylan Rahier	33.74	(Ontario) Alex Buehlow	35.70
100 m breaststroke	(British Columbia) Michael Xiaohang Cai	1:01.16	(Ontario) Matthew Stephenson	1:01.72	(Quebec) Michael Luck	1:02.78
100 m breaststroke SWAD	(British Columbia) Kyle McMahon	1:35.31	(Ontario) Christopher Tsonos-Sergeant	1:36.19	(Quebec) Jean-Michel Lavalière	1:40.90
200 m breaststroke	(British Columbia) Michael Xiaohang Cai	2:10.21	(Ontario) Matthew Stephenson	2:13.27	(Quebec) Michael Luck	2:14.71
50 m butterfly	(British Columbia) Andre Kudaba	24.31	(British Columbia) Charles Tapp	24.35	(Quebec) Christopher Bezeau	24.50
100 m butterfly	(British Columbia) Andre Kudaba	52.86	(Alberta) Karl Wolk	53.36	(Quebec) Christopher Bezeau	53.52
100 m butterfly SWAD	(Quebec) Jean-Michel Lavalière	1:39.57	(Ontario) Christopher Tsonos-Sergeant	1:43.45	(British Columbia) Nicholas Gustave Lapointe	2:39.35
200 m butterfly	(Nova Scotia) David Sharpe	1:56.93	(Alberta) Karl Wolk	1:57.78	(Ontario) Curtis Samuel	1:58.29
200 m individual medley	(British Columbia) Michael Xiaohang Cai	1:59.75	(Alberta) David Dimitrov	2:01.14	(Ontario) Mack Darragh	2:02.56
200 m SWAD individual medley	(Alberta) Zack McAllister	2:54.88	(Ontario) Christopher Tsonos-Sergeant	3:17.84	(British Columbia) Nicholas Lapointe	4:47.90
400 m individual medley	(British Columbia) Michael Xiaohang Cai	4:14.58	(Alberta) David Dimitrov	4:14.66	(Quebec) Daniel Jensen	4:18.33
4×50 m freestyle relay	Alberta		Quebec		British Columbia	
4 × 100 m freestyle relay	Alberta	3:16.21	Ontario	3:16.48	Quebec	3:16.80
4 × 200 m freestyle relay	Ontario	7:09.49	Alberta	7:11.14	Quebec	7:12.49
4×50 m medley relay	British Columbia	1:38.05	Alberta	1:38.94	Ontario	1:39.12
4 × 100 m medley relay	British Columbia	3:36.54	Ontario	3:37.42	Alberta	3:37.43
10 km open water	(British Columbia) Richard Weinberger	2:03:57	(Quebec) Xavier Desharnais	2:05:26	(Ontario) Aimeson King	2:07:22

=== Women's events ===
Event	Gold		Silver		Bronze	
50 m freestyle	(Quebec) Sandrine Mainville	24.99	(Manitoba) Chantal van Landeghem	25.07	(Ontario) Michelle Williams	25.59
50 m freestyle SOC	(Ontario) Erica Buehlow	30.18	(British Columbia) Kelsey Wyse	32.25	(British Columbia) Nicole Lowery	34.78
50 m freestyle SWAD	(Alberta) Morgan Bird	33.98	(Quebec) Jessica Roberge	34.35	(Newfoundland and Labrador) Erica Noonan	36.33
100 m freestyle	(Manitoba) Chantal van Landeghem	54.12	(Ontario) Sinead Russell	54.15	(Yukon) Alexandra Gabor	54.47
100 m freestyle SOC	(Ontario) Erica Buehlow	1:05.23	(British Columbia) Kelsey Wyse	1:09.45	(Ontario) Meagan Michie	1:23.53
100 m freestyle SWAD	(Quebec) Jessica Roberge	1:13.03	(Alberta) Morgan Bird	1:15.19	(Newfoundland and Labrador) Erica Noonan	1:19.63
200 m freestyle	(Yukon) Alexandra Gabor	1:56.33	(Ontario) Sinead Russell	1:58.55	(British Columbia) Olivia Montgomery	1:58.72
400 m freestyle	(Yukon) Alexandra Gabor	4:08.21	(Ontario) Jackie Keire	4:08.31	(Ontario) Sinead Russell	4:08.47
800 m freestyle	(Ontario) Bridget Coley	8:33.17	(Manitoba) Leah Daniel	8:36.00	(Yukon) Alexandra Gabor	8:36.18
1500 m freestyle	(British Columbia) Karyn Jewell	16:29.45	(Manitoba) Leah Daniel	16:33.41	(Ontario) Bridget Clare Coley	16:35.44
50 m backstroke	(Ontario) Danielle Carty	27.97	(Ontario) Sinead Russell	28.05	(British Columbia) Hilary Caldwell	28.52
50 m backstroke SOC	(Ontario) Erica Buehlow	37.51	(British Columbia) Nicole Lowery	41.17	(British Columbia) Kelsey Wyse	42.04
100 m backstroke	(Manitoba) Chantal van Landeghem	59.26	(Ontario) Sinead Russell	59.28	(Ontario) Danielle Carty	1:00.41
100 m backstroke SOC	(Ontario) Erica Buehlow	1:20.52	(Ontario) Meagan Michie	1:31.30	(British Columbia) Kelsey Wyse	1:31.61
100 m backstroke SWAD	(Quebec) Camille Bérubé	1:28.50	(British Columbia) Sarah Mehain	1:29.15	(Quebec) Jessica Roberge	1:30.42
200 m backstroke	(Ontario) Annie Harrison	2:12.74	(Alberta) Brooklynn Snodgrass	2:14.09	(British Columbia) Olivia Montgomery	2:14.17
50 m breaststroke	(Ontario) Tera van Beilen	30.95	(Alberta) Kayla Voytechek	31.09	(Alberta) Rachel Nicol	31.31
50 m breaststroke SOC	(Ontario) Tera van Beilen	30.95	(Alberta) Kayla Voytechek	31.09	(Alberta) Rachel Nicol	31.31
100 m breaststroke	(Ontario) Tera van Beilen	1:06.92	(Alberta) Rachel Nicol	1:07.91	(Alberta) Kayla Voytechek	1:07.99
100 m breaststroke SWAD	(Quebec) Jessica Roberge	1:26.03	(Newfoundland and Labrador) Erica Noonan	1:31.91	(Northwest Territories) Katherine Elkin	2:00.26
200 m breaststroke	(Ontario) Tera van Beilen	2:24.00	(Alberta) Rachel Nicol	2:25.69	(Alberta) Tianna Rissling	2:26.01
50 m butterfly	(Quebec) Katerine Savard	26.91	(Saskatchewan) Kendra Chernoff	26.97	(Manitoba) Chantal van Landeghem	27.04
100 m butterfly	(Saskatchewan) Kendra Chernoff	58.54	(Quebec) Katerine Savard	59.03	(Quebec) Vanessa Charron	1:00.11
100 m butterfly SWAD	(Quebec) Jessica Roberge	1:26.03	(Newfoundland and Labrador) Erica Noonan	1:31.91	(Northwest Territories) Katherine Elkin	2:00.26
200 m butterfly	(Saskatchewan) Kendra Chernoff	2:09.44	(Quebec) Vanessa Charron	2:10.73	(Quebec) Katerine Savard	2:12.62
200 m individual medley	(British Columbia) Hilary Caldwell	2:13.87	(Ontario) Julie Calvert	2:14.44	(Alberta) Natasha Fung	2:14.87
200 m individual medley SWAD	(Quebec) Jessica Roberge	3:09.38	(Newfoundland and Labrador) Erica Noonan	3:17.82	(Alberta) Kennedy Pasay	3:21.52
400 m individual medley	(Alberta) Deanna Matthews	4:41.97	(Ontario) Annie Harrison	4:42.93	(Alberta) Brooklynn Snodgrass	4:45.22
4×50 m freestyle	Quebec	1:40.77	Ontario	1:41.68	Alberta	1:42.23
4 × 100 m freestyle	Ontario	3:39.67	Quebec	3:40.29	Alberta	3:42.41
4×50 m medley relay	Ontario	1:50.18	Alberta	1:52.37	Quebec	1:52.63
4 × 100 m medley relay	Ontario	4:01.45	Alberta	4:05.22	Quebec	4:06.14
10 km open water	(Ontario) Bridgit Coley	2:13:02	(British Columbia) Julianne Brown	2:13:17	(British Columbia) Karyn Jewell	2:17:26

== Tennis ==
Event	Gold	Silver	Bronze
Men's singles	(Quebec) Panav Jha	(Ontario) Zachary White	(British Columbia) Nikolai Haessig
Women's singles	(Quebec) Elizabeth Abanda	(Ontario) Katarena Paliivets	(Ontario) Gabriela Dabrowski
Men's doubles	(Quebec) Isade Juneau and Samuel Monette	(British Columbia)	(Manitoba) Sean Bailey and Chad Lacap
Women's doubles	(Ontario) Elianne Douglas-Miron and Amy He	(Quebec) Marie-Frédérique Bédard and Marianne Jodoin	(Alberta) Britt Voaklander and Erika Voaklander
Mixed doubles	Quebec	Ontario	British Columbia

== Triathlon ==
Event	Gold	Silver	Bronze
Men's	(British Columbia) Jeffrey David Phillips	(Ontario) Connor Hammond	(British Columbia) Cole Griffin Ross Stewart
Women's	(British Columbia) Alison Hooper	(Manitoba) Sarah-Anne Brault	(British Columbia) Kyla Danielle Coates

== Volleyball ==
Event	Gold	Silver	Bronze
Men's	Alberta	Ontario	British Columbia
Women's	Manitoba	Ontario	Alberta

== Wrestling ==
=== Men's ===
Event	Gold	Silver	Bronze
39 to 42 kg	(Ontario) Ameed Lakhani	(British Columbia) Amrit Singh Sund	(Saskatchewan) Blake Terry
Up to 46 kg	(Ontario) Jonathon Babulall	(Saskatchewan) Patrick Leynes	(Alberta) Quinn Graham
Up to 50 kg	(Ontario) Steven Takahashi	(British Columbia) Sukhan Chahal	(New Brunswick) Corey Boudreau
Up to 54 kg	(Alberta) Spenser Burk	(New Brunswick) Jean-Francois Godin	(Ontario) Luke Roberts
Up to 58 kg	(Ontario) Duncan Moffat	(Alberta) Josue Hernandez-Navas	(British Columbia) Yousif Safar
Up to 63 kg	(Ontario) Ilya Abelev	(Alberta) Matthew Bustard	(British Columbia) Mandeep Sandhu
Up to 69 kg	(Ontario) Jake Jagas	(Quebec) Arash Bagheri	(British Columbia) Michael Cappus
Up to 76 kg	(British Columbia) Balwinder Singh Sahota	(Alberta) Spencer Watkins	(Ontario) Jason Brenton-Hurst
Up to 85 kg	(Nova Scotia) Riley Otto	(British Columbia) Arjun Gill	(Alberta) Jordan Ferguson
Up to 100 kg	(Ontario) Tyson Frost	(British Columbia) Parmvir Singh Dhesi	(Alberta) Nick Proctor
Up to 115 kg	(British Columbia) Sunny Dhinsa	(Ontario) Ilya Manukhov	(Saskatchewan) Donovan Dale
Not over 130 kg	(British Columbia) Navneet Singh Dulat	(Saskatchewan) Tristain Hoath	(Ontario) Kenny Reichelt
Team	Ontario	British Columbia	Alberta

=== Women's ===
Event	Gold	Silver	Bronze
36 to 38 kg	(Ontario) Daphne Ng	(Alberta) Tonia Zenner	
Up to 40 kg	(British Columbia) Hiroko Araki	(New Brunswick) Valerie Godin	(Saskatchewan) Katelynn Wilkins
Up to 43 kg	(Ontario) Darby Huckle	(New Brunswick) Valérie Ouellette	(Alberta) Cara Nania
Up to 46 kg	(Ontario) Madison Parks	(Saskatchewan) Hannah Franson	(British Columbia) Michiko Araki
Up to 49 kg	(New Brunswick) Allyssa Cleaves	(Quebec) Karyanne Roberge	(Ontario) Sydney Duggan
Up to 52 kg	(Ontario) Linda Morais	(Saskatchewan) Nicole Corbin	(British Columbia) Emily Weekes
Up to 56 kg	(Alberta) Natalie Brady	(Saskatchewan) Kelsie Boszak	(Ontario) Courtney Willett
Up to 60 kg	(Ontario) Larissa D'Alleva	(Alberta) Tommi Seida	(British Columbia) Sarah Morten
Up to 65 kg	(Quebec) Dorothy Yeats	(Prince Edward Island) Jillian Durant	(Ontario) Marissa Sorrell
Up to 70 kg	(Ontario) Jeramie Herrington	(British Columbia) Justina Di Stasio	(Saskatchewan) Kelsey Gsell
Up to 80 kg	(Prince Edward Island) Veronica Keefe	(Alberta) Holly Clark	(British Columbia) Jenna McLatchy
Not over 90 kg	(Alberta) Breanne Pare	(Saskatchewan) Jackie Boudreau	(Nova Scotia) Jillian Mosher
Team	Ontario	Alberta	Saskatchewan
