= 2012 World Junior Championships in Athletics – Women's 200 metres =

The women's 200 metres at the 2012 World Junior Championships in Athletics was held at the Estadi Olímpic Lluís Companys on 12 and 13 July.

== Medalists ==
Gold	Anthonique Strachan; Bahamas
Silver	Olivia Ekpone; United States
Bronze	Dezerea Bryant; United States

== Records ==
Standing records prior to the 2012 World Junior Championships in Athletics
World Junior Record	Allyson Felix (USA)	22.18	Athens, Greece	25 August 2004
Championship Record	Shalonda Solomon (USA)	22.82	Grosseto, Italy	16 July 2004
World Junior Leading	Shaunae Miller (BAH)	22.70	Nassau, Bahamas	2 March 2012
Broken records during the 2012 World Junior Championships in Athletics
Championship Record; World Junior Leading	Anthonique Strachan (BAH)	22.53	Barcelona, Spain	13 July 2012

== Results ==
=== Heats ===
Qualification: The first 3 of each heat (Q) and the 3 fastest times (q) qualified

Rank	Heat	Lane	Name	Nationality	Time	Note
1	7	9	Shericka Jackson	Jamaica	23.35	Q, SB
2	7	7	Isidora Jiménez	Chile	23.42	Q, NJ
3	4	5	Dezerea Bryant	United States	23.54	Q
4	2	5	Anthonique Strachan	Bahamas	23.70	Q
5	6	9	Dina Asher-Smith	Great Britain	23.71	Q
6	5	4	Olivia Ekpone	United States	23.74	Q
6	5	9	Imke Vervaet	Belgium	23.74	Q
8	5	6	Desiree Henry	Great Britain	23.78	Q, SB
9	3	8	Janet Amponsah	Ghana	23.83	Q
10	1	2	Jodean Williams	Jamaica	23.88	Q, PB
11	3	9	Nimet Karakus	Turkey	23.89	Q
12	5	5	Irene Siragusa	Italy	23.93	q, PB
13	2	4	Karin Okolie	Bulgaria	23.97	Q, PB
13	2	7	Monica Brennan	Australia	23.97	Q
15	5	8	Gina Lückenkemper	Germany	23.98	q, PB
16	2	9	Angelika Stępień	Poland	24.01	q
17	4	4	Tamiris de Liz	Brazil	24.02	Q
18	7	5	Anna Hämäläinen	Finland	24.04	Q
19	1	4	Carmiesha Cox	Bahamas	24.08	Q
20	1	7	Fany Chalas	Dominican Republic	24.22	Q
21	4	3	Kristina Khorosheva	Russia	24.26	Q
22	4	7	Iza Daniela Flores	Mexico	24.27	
23	1	8	Wisdom Isoken	Nigeria	24.29	
24	1	3	Chante van Tonder	South Africa	24.50	
25	6	5	Shai-Anne Davis	Canada	24.52	Q
26	7	4	Liezl Hechter	South Africa	24.54	
27	5	7	Nina Prudnikova	Kazakhstan	24.55	
28	6	3	Nathalia da Rosa	Brazil	24.56	Q
29	3	7	Rosalie Tschann	Austria	24.61	Q
30	7	8	Astrid Mangen Cederkvist	Norway	24.63	
31	6	4	Luan Gabriel	Dominica	24.65	
32	1	6	Oksana Ralko	Ukraine	24.71	
33	5	3	Charlène Keller	Switzerland	24.72	
34	3	5	Sara Atcho	Switzerland	24.73	
34	2	3	Cristina Lara	Spain	24.73	
34	2	6	Jiawen He	China	24.73	
37	4	8	Bryannill Cardona	Venezuela	24.75	
38	6	8	Anna-Lena Freese	Germany	24.78	
38	3	2	Isatu Fofanah	Canada	24.78	
40	2	8	Viviana Olivares	Chile	24.87	
41	6	6	Aneja Kodric	Slovenia	24.92	
42	6	7	Francesca Scapin	Italy	25.01	
43	3	4	Qingqing Wu	China	25.04	
44	3	3	Marie Gisele Eleme	Cameroon	25.12	SB
45	1	5	Maysa Rejepova	Turkmenistan	25.97	PB
46	7	3	Olga Eshmurodova	Tajikistan	26.41	
47	3	6	Hereiti Bernardino	French Polynesia	26.77	PB
	4	6	Sheniece Daphness	Guyana	DQ	
	4	9	Brittany Morton	Saint Kitts and Nevis	DNS	
	1	9	Doreen Agyei Safowaa	Ghana	DNS	
	7	6	Nkiru Nwakwe	Nigeria	DNS	

=== Semi-finals ===
Qualification: The first 2 of each heat (Q) and the 2 fastest times (q) qualified

Rank	Heat	Lane	Name	Nationality	Time	Note
1	3	5	Dezerea Bryant	United States	23.11	Q
2	2	4	Anthonique Strachan	Bahamas	23.28	Q
2	3	8	Desiree Henry	Great Britain	23.28	Q, SB
4	1	5	Olivia Ekpone	United States	23.49	Q
4	2	5	Imke Vervaet	Belgium	23.49	Q, PB
4	3	6	Janet Amponsah	Ghana	23.49	q, PB
7	2	7	Dina Asher-Smith	Great Britain	23.57	q, PB
8	1	6	Shericka Jackson	Jamaica	23.58	Q
9	1	7	Isidora Jiménez	Chile	23.59	
10	2	2	Irene Siragusa	Italy	23.75	PB
11	2	9	Monica Brennan	Australia	23.85	
12	1	9	Carmiesha Cox	Bahamas	23.94	
12	3	4	Jodean Williams	Jamaica	23.94	
14	3	2	Gina Lückenkemper	Germany	23.99	
15	1	4	Tamiris de Liz	Brazil	24.03	
16	1	8	Fany Chalas	Dominican Republic	24.15	
17	3	7	Karin Okolie	Bulgaria	24.17	
17	1	3	Angelika Stępień	Poland	24.17	
19	3	9	Shai-Anne Davis	Canada	24.23	
20	1	2	Kristina Khorosheva	Russia	24.25	
21	3	3	Nathalia da Rosa	Brazil	24.43	PB
22	2	3	Rosalie Tschann	Austria	24.50	
22	2	8	Anna Hämäläinen	Finland	24.50	
–	2	6	Nimet Karakus	Turkey	DQ	

=== Final ===
Wind: +0.2 m/s

Rank	Lane	Name	Nationality	Time	Note
1st place, gold medalist(s)	6	Anthonique Strachan	Bahamas	22.53	WJL, CR
2nd place, silver medalist(s)	5	Olivia Ekpone	United States	23.15	PB
3rd place, bronze medalist(s)	7	Dezerea Bryant	United States	23.15	
4	4	Desiree Henry	Great Britain	23.34	
5	2	Janet Amponsah	Ghana	23.41	PB
6	9	Imke Vervaet	Belgium	23.47	PB
7	3	Dina Asher-Smith	Great Britain	23.50	PB
8	8	Shericka Jackson	Jamaica	23.53	

== Participation ==
According to an unofficial count, 48 athletes from 36 countries participated in the event.

- Australia (1)
- Austria (1)
- Bahamas (2)
- Belgium (1)
- Brazil (2)
- Bulgaria (1)
- Cameroon (1)
- Canada (2)
- Chile (2)
- China (2)
- Dominica (1)
- Dominican Republic (1)
- Finland (1)
- French Polynesia (1)
- Germany (2)
- Ghana (1)
- Guyana (1)
- Italy (2)
- Jamaica (2)
- Kazakhstan (1)
- Mexico (1)
- Nigeria (1)
- Norway (1)
- Poland (1)
- Russia (1)
- Slovenia (1)
- South Africa (2)
- Spain (1)
- Switzerland (2)
- Tajikistan (1)
- Turkey (1)
- Turkmenistan (1)
- Ukraine (1)
- United Kingdom (2)
- United States (2)
- Venezuela (1)
