= 2012 World Junior Championships in Athletics – Women's 100 metres =

The women's 100 metres at the 2012 World Junior Championships in Athletics will be held at the Estadi Olímpic Lluís Companys on 10 and 11 July.

Reigning champion Jodie Williams was eligible to defend her 2010 title, but did not compete.

== Medalists ==
Gold	Anthonique Strachan; The Bahamas
Silver	Nimet Karakus; Turkey
Bronze	Tamiris de Liz; Brazil

== Records ==
Prior to the competition, the existing world junior and championship records were as follows.

World Junior Record	Marlies Göhr (GDR)	10.88	Dresden, Germany	1 July 1977
Championship Record	Veronica Campbell-Brown (JAM)	11.12	Santiago, Chile	18 October 2000
World Junior Leading	Anthonique Strachan (BAH)	11.22	Nassau, Bahamas	23 March 2012
Broken records during the 2012 World Junior Championships in Athletics
World Junior Leading	Anthonique Strachan (BAH)	11.20	Barcelona, Spain	11 July 2012

== Results ==
=== Heats ===
Qualification: The first 3 of each heat (Q) and the 3 fastest times (q) qualified

Rank	Heat	Lane	Name	Nationality	Time	Note
1	2	6	Tamiris de Liz	Brazil	11.56	Q
1	5	5	Dezerea Bryant	United States	11.56	Q
3	1	4	Nimet Karakus	Turkey	11.57	Q
3	5	8	Khamica Bingham	Canada	11.57	Q, SB
5	3	3	Sophie Papps	Great Britain	11.59	Q
5	7	2	Anthonique Strachan	Bahamas	11.59	Q
7	3	6	Fany Chalas	Dominican Republic	11.63	Q
8	6	4	Jennifer Madu	United States	11.64	Q
9	1	6	Udochi Ekeh	Italy	11.70	Q
10	7	8	Kadecia Baird	Guyana	11.72	Q
11	7	7	Rachel Johncock	Great Britain	11.75	Q
12	5	7	Angelika Stępień	Poland	11.76	Q
12	6	2	Ida Mayer	Germany	11.76	Q
14	2	9	Shawnette Lewin	Jamaica	11.78	Q
14	4	5	Monique Spencer	Jamaica	11.78	Q
16	4	6	Rosalie Tschann	Austria	11.80	Q
16	6	7	Janet Amponsah	Ghana	11.80	Q
18	3	2	Clémence Paiement	Canada	11.88	Q
19	4	7	Nina Prudnikova	Kazakhstan	11.94	Q
20	4	8	Jiawen He	China	11.96	q, PB
21	1	5	Carla Williams	Australia	11.97	Q
22	6	5	Ashleigh Whittaker	Australia	11.97	q
23	7	4	Lisa Wickham	Trinidad and Tobago	11.98	q
24	2	8	Tayla Carter	Bahamas	12.00	Q
24	3	7	Viviana Olivares	Chile	12.00	
24	7	5	Camila de Souza	Brazil	12.00	
27	4	3	Philippa van der Merwe	South Africa	12.03	
28	2	3	Aaliyah Telesford	Trinidad and Tobago	12.05	
28	3	4	Martina Černochová	Czech Republic	12.05	
30	1	8	Katharina Grompe	Germany	12.06	
30	7	3	Nurul Imaniar	Indonesia	12.06	SB
32	6	8	Elisa Paiero	Italy	12.08	
33	3	5	Xiaoyan Xiao	China	12.11	
34	5	2	Ana Maria Rosianu	Romania	12.20	
35	1	7	Paula Llistosella	Spain	12.21	
35	2	2	Brittany Morton	Saint Kitts and Nevis	12.21	
35	5	6	Nabeela Parker	South Africa	12.21	
38	6	6	Iza Daniela Flores	Mexico	12.28	
39	3	8	Maha Al Moallem	Lebanon	12.33	PB
40	5	4	Lovelite Detenamo	Nauru	12.75	SB
41	2	5	Rachel Abrams	Northern Mariana Islands	13.05	PB
42	5	3	Cristina Llovera	Andorra	13.07	
43	2	7	Alice Capicchioni	San Marino	13.13	PB
44	1	2	Valbona Selimi	Macedonia	13.18	SB
45	1	3	Abygirl Sepiso	Zambia	13.19	
	4	2	Lidiane Lopes	Cape Verde	DQ	
	6	3	Hadeel Raheem Kaood	Iraq	DQ	
	2	4	Goodness Thomas	Nigeria	DNS	
	4	4	Josephine Ada Omaka	Nigeria	DNS	
	7	6	Anna Bulanova	Kyrgyzstan	DNS	

=== Semi-final ===
Qualification: The first 2 of each heat (Q) and the 2 fastest times (q) qualified

Rank	Heat	Lane	Name	Nationality	Time	Note
1	3	7	Tamiris de Liz	Brazil	11.42	Q, PB
2	3	5	Ida Mayer	Germany	11.47	Q, PB
3	3	4	Jennifer Madu	United States	11.49	q
4	1	5	Nimet Karakus	Turkey	11.58	Q
5	1	6	Fany Chalas	Dominican Republic	11.68	Q
6	2	7	Anthonique Strachan	Bahamas	11.68	Q
7	1	7	Sophie Papps	Great Britain	11.68	q
8	3	6	Monique Spencer	Jamaica	11.73	
9	1	2	Tayla Carter	Bahamas	11.76	
10	2	4	Khamica Bingham	Canada	11.77	Q
11	2	6	Dezerea Bryant	United States	11.77	
12	3	3	Ashleigh Whittaker	Australia	11.81	
13	3	8	Clémence Paiement	Canada	11.86	
14	3	6	Rosalie Tschann	Austria	11.87	
15	1	4	Udochi Ekeh	Italy	11.88	
16	1	8	Angelika Stępień	Poland	11.91	
17	1	9	Janet Amponsah	Ghana	11.94	
18	2	8	Rachel Johncock	Great Britain	11.99	
19	3	7	Nina Prudnikova	Kazakhstan	11.99	
20	2	9	Shawnette Lewin	Jamaica	12.09	
21	1	3	Jiawen He	China	12.19	
22	2	3	Lisa Wickham	Trinidad and Tobago	12.19	
23	2	5	Kadecia Baird	Guyana	12.24	
24	2	2	Carla Williams	Australia	12.31	

=== Final ===
Wind: +1.7 m/s

Rank	Lane	Name	Nationality	Time	Note
1st place, gold medalist(s)	6	Anthonique Strachan	Bahamas	11.20	WJL
2nd place, silver medalist(s)	7	Nimet Karakus	Turkey	11.36	
3rd place, bronze medalist(s)	4	Tamiris de Liz	Brazil	11.45	
4	8	Khamica Bingham	Canada	11.46	PB
5	2	Jennifer Madu	United States	11.52	
6	3	Sophie Papps	Great Britain	11.54	
7	9	Fany Chalas	Dominican Republic	11.58	
8	5	Ida Mayer	Germany	11.59	

== Participation ==
According to an unofficial count, 47 athletes from 35 countries participated in the event.

- Andorra (1)
- Australia (2)
- Austria (1)
- Bahamas (2)
- Brazil (2)
- Canada (2)
- Cape Verde (1)
- Chile (1)
- China (2)
- Czech Republic (1)
- Dominican Republic (1)
- Germany (2)
- Ghana (1)
- Guyana (1)
- Indonesia (1)
- Iraq (1)
- Italy (2)
- Jamaica (2)
- Kazakhstan (1)
- Lebanon (1)
- Macedonia (1)
- Mexico (1)
- Nauru (1)
- Northern Mariana Islands (1)
- Poland (1)
- Romania (1)
- Saint Kitts and Nevis (1)
- San Marino (1)
- South Africa (2)
- Spain (1)
- Trinidad and Tobago (2)
- Turkey (1)
- United Kingdom (2)
- United States (2)
- Zambia (1)
