= 2010 World Junior Championships in Athletics – Women's 100 metres =

The women's 100 metres at the 2010 World Junior Championships in Athletics was held at the Moncton 2010 Stadium on 20 & 21 July.

== Medalists ==
Gold	Silver	Bronze
Jodie Williams; Great Britain	Takeia Pinckney; United States	Jamile Samuel; Netherlands

== Records ==
Prior to the competition, the existing world junior and championship records were as follows.

	Name	Nationality	Time	Location	Date
World junior record	Marlies Oelsner	East Germany	10.88	Dresden	July 1, 1977
Championship record	Veronica Campbell	Jamaica	11.12	Santiago de Chile	October 18, 2000

No new records were established during the competition.

== Results ==
=== Final ===
21 July
Wind: -0.7 m/s

Rank	Name	Nationality	Time	Notes
1st place, gold medalist(s)	Jodie Williams	United Kingdom	11.40	
2nd place, silver medalist(s)	Takeia Pinckney	United States	11.49	
3rd place, bronze medalist(s)	Jamile Samuel	Netherlands	11.56	
4	Ashton Purvis	United States	11.60	
5	Leena Günther	Germany	11.67	
6	Tatjana Pinto	Germany	11.80	
7	Loudia Laarman	Canada	11.81	
8	Stella Silas	Nigeria	11.98	

=== Semifinals ===
21 July

==== Semifinal 1 ====
Wind: +1.7 m/s

Rank	Name	Nationality	Time	Notes
1	Tatjana Pinto	Germany	11.68	Q
2	Takeia Pinckney	United States	11.71	Q
3	Loudia Laarman	Canada	11.73	q
4	Fanny Chalas	Dominican Republic	11.87	
5	Marilyn Nwawulor	United Kingdom	11.95	
6	Deandre Whitehorne	Jamaica	12.05	
7	Lenka Kršáková	Slovakia	12.27	
8	Nodoka Seko	Japan	12.28	

==== Semifinal 2 ====
Wind: +1.6 m/s

Rank	Name	Nationality	Time	Notes
1	Ashton Purvis	United States	11.68	Q
2	Leena Günther	Germany	11.72	Q
3	Bárbara Leôncio	Brazil	11.78	
4	Anasztázia Nguyen	Hungary	11.92	
5	Siedatha Palmer	Jamaica	11.93	
6	Orlann Ombissa	France	12.01	
7	Martina Amidei	Italy	12.16	
8	Kirsten Niuwendam	Suriname	12.36	

==== Semifinal 3 ====
Wind: +1.2 m/s

Rank	Name	Nationality	Time	Notes
1	Jodie Williams	United Kingdom	11.59	Q
2	Jamile Samuel	Netherlands	11.68	Q
3	Stella Silas	Nigeria	11.78	q
4	Caitlin Sargent	Australia	11.90	
5	Mujinga Kambundji	Switzerland	11.92	
6	Jessie Saint-Marc	France	12.00	
7	V'Alonnee Robinson	Bahamas	12.14	
8	María Martín-Sacristán	Spain	12.17	

=== Heats ===
20 July

==== Heat 1 ====
Wind: +0.3 m/s

Rank	Name	Nationality	Time	Notes
1	Leena Günther	Germany	11.50	Q
2	Mujinga Kambundji	Switzerland	11.70	Q
3	Deandre Whitehorne	Jamaica	11.82	Q
4	Marilyn Nwawulor	United Kingdom	11.85	q
5	Shinelle Proctor	Anguilla	13.01	
6	Battsengel Tungalag	Mongolia	13.68	
	Alja Sitar	Slovenia	DQ	IAAF rule 162.7

==== Heat 2 ====
Wind: +0.2 m/s

Rank	Name	Nationality	Time	Notes
1	Ashton Purvis	United States	11.73	Q
2	Orlann Ombissa	France	11.78	Q
3	Martina Amidei	Italy	11.86	Q
4	Siedatha Palmer	Jamaica	11.87	q
5	Lenka Kršáková	Slovakia	12.07	q
6	Patricia Taea	Cook Islands	13.05	

==== Heat 3 ====
Wind: +0.2 m/s

Rank	Name	Nationality	Time	Notes
1	Takeia Pinckney	United States	11.48	Q
2	Bárbara Leôncio	Brazil	11.67	Q
3	Anasztázia Nguyen	Hungary	12.00	Q
4	Lee Sun-Ae	South Korea	12.16	
5	Victoria Woodward	Argentina	12.25	
6	Angie Lam On Ki	Hong Kong	12.31	
7	Joanne Loutoy	Seychelles	12.65	

==== Heat 4 ====
Wind: +0.1 m/s

Rank	Name	Nationality	Time	Notes
1	Tatjana Pinto	Germany	11.63	Q
2	Caitlin Sargent	Australia	11.77	Q
3	Jessie Saint-Marc	France	11.83	Q
4	Stella Silas	Nigeria	11.90	q
5	V'Alonnee Robinson	Bahamas	11.95	q
6	Kirsten Niuwendam	Suriname	12.07	q
7	Shantely Scott	Costa Rica	12.92	
8	Marina Ramadani	Albania	13.31	

==== Heat 5 ====
Wind: 0.0 m/s

Rank	Name	Nationality	Time	Notes
1	Jodie Williams	United Kingdom	11.53	Q
2	Loudia Laarman	Canada	11.64	Q
3	María Martín-Sacristán	Spain	11.97	Q
4	Marvar Etienne	Bahamas	12.12	
5	Chathubashini Maralanda	Sri Lanka	12.43	
6	Lovelite Detenamo	Nauru	12.75	

==== Heat 6 ====
Wind: +0.3 m/s

Rank	Name	Nationality	Time	Notes
1	Jamile Samuel	Netherlands	11.57	Q
2	Fanny Chalas	Dominican Republic	11.80	Q
3	Nodoka Seko	Japan	12.07	Q
4	Fanni Schmelcz	Hungary	12.13	
5	Nimet Karakuş	Turkey	12.33	
6	Aziza Sbaity	Lebanon	12.44	
7	Rebecca Kafanfdo	Burkina Faso	12.66	

== Participation ==
According to an unofficial count, 41 athletes from 34 countries participated in the event.

- Albania (1)
- Anguilla (1)
- Argentina (1)
- Australia (1)
- Bahamas (2)
- Brazil (1)
- Burkina Faso (1)
- Canada (1)
- Cook Islands (1)
- Costa Rica (1)
- Dominican Republic (1)
- France (2)
- Germany (2)
- Hong Kong (1)
- Hungary (2)
- Italy (1)
- Jamaica (2)
- Japan (1)
- Lebanon (1)
- Mongolia (1)
- Nauru (1)
- Netherlands (1)
- Nigeria (1)
- Seychelles (1)
- Slovakia (1)
- Slovenia (1)
- South Korea (1)
- Spain (1)
- Sri Lanka (1)
- Suriname (1)
- Switzerland (1)
- Turkey (1)
- United Kingdom (2)
- United States (2)
