= Fany Chalas =

Dominican sprinter

Personal information
- Full name: Fany Santa Chalas Frías
- Nationality: Dominican Republic
- Born: 2 February 1993 (age 33) El Seibo, Dominican Republic

Sport
- Sport: Track and field
- Event: Sprints

Achievements and titles
- Personal best(s): 100 m: 11.53 (San Salvador 2012); 200 m: 23.51 (Santo Domingo 2012)
Medal record
Women's athletics
Representing the Dominican Republic
Ibero-American Championships
| Silver medal – second place | 2012 Barquisimeto | 4×100 m relay |
Summer Youth Olympics
| Bronze medal – third place | 2010 Singapore | 100 m |
- Updated on 29 December 2014

Fany Santa Chalas Frías (born 2 February 1993) is a Dominican sprinter.

She won gold medals over 100 and 200 metres at the 2012 Central American and Caribbean Junior Championships in Athletics in San Salvador.

== Personal bests ==
| Event | Result | Venue | Date |
|---|---|---|---|
| 100 m | 11.38 s A (wind: +1.3 m/s) | Morelia, Mexico | 5 Jul 2013 |
| 200 m | 23.51 s (wind: -1.3 m/s) | Santo Domingo, Dominican Republic | 31 Mar 2012 |
| Long jump | 5.52 m (wind: +1.8 m/s) | Toluca, Mexico | 22 Jul 2008 |

== International competitions ==
| Year | Competition | Venue | Position | Event | Notes |
Representing the Dominican Republic
| 2008 | NACAC U-23 Championships | Toluca, Mexico | 5th | Long jump | 5.52m (wind: NWI) A |
| 2008 | NACAC U-23 Championships | Toluca, Mexico | 3rd | 4 × 100 m relay | 46.23 A |
| 2009 | World Youth Championship | Bressanone, Italy | 6th | 100 m | 11.80 (wind: +0.7 m/s) |
| 2009 | World Youth Championship | Bressanone, Italy | 4th (sf) | 200 m | 24.48 (wind: +0.5 m/s) |
| 2009 | Pan American Junior Championships | Port of Spain, Trinidad and Tobago | 8th | 100 m | 11.95 (wind: +0.8 m/s) |
| 2009 | Pan American Junior Championships | Port of Spain, Trinidad and Tobago | — | 200 m | DNF |
| 2009 | Pan American Junior Championships | Port of Spain, Trinidad and Tobago | 6th | 4 × 100 m relay | 46.48 |
| 2009 | Pan American Junior Championships | Port of Spain, Trinidad and Tobago | 6th | 4 × 400 m relay | 3:53.37 |
| 2010 | Central American and Caribbean Junior Championships (U20) | Santo Domingo, Dominican Republic | 2nd | 100 m | 11.97 (wind: -1.8 m/s) |
| 2010 | Central American and Caribbean Junior Championships (U20) | Santo Domingo, Dominican Republic | 3rd | 200 m | 23.94 (wind: 0.0 m/s) |
| 2010 | Central American and Caribbean Junior Championships (U20) | Santo Domingo, Dominican Republic | — | 4 × 100 m relay | DNF |
| 2010 | Central American and Caribbean Junior Championships (U20) | Santo Domingo, Dominican Republic | 4th | 4 × 400 m relay | 3:49.54 |
| 2010 | World Junior Championships | Moncton, Canada | 4th (sf) | 100 m | 11.87^{1} |
| 2010 | World Junior Championships | Moncton, Canada | 5th (sf) | 200 m | 24.02 (wind: +1.8 m/s) |
| 2010 | Central American and Caribbean Games | Mayagüez, Puerto Rico | 4th | 4 × 100 m relay | 44.75 |
| 2010 | Youth Olympic Games | Singapore | 3rd | 100 m | 11.65 (wind: +0.2 m/s) |
| 2011 | Central American and Caribbean Championships | Mayagüez, Puerto Rico | 5th | 4 × 100 m relay | 44.68 |
| 2011 | Military World Games | Rio de Janeiro, Brazil | 4th (h) | 100 m | 11.89 (wind: +0.1 m/s) |
| 2012 | Ibero-American Championships | Barquisimeto, Venezuela | 8th | 100 m | 12.81 (wind: -0.6 m/s) |
| 2012 | Ibero-American Championships | Barquisimeto, Venezuela | 10th (h) | 200 m | 23.80 (wind: -1.2 m/s) |
| 2012 | Ibero-American Championships | Barquisimeto, Venezuela | 2nd | 4 × 100 m relay | 44.04 |
| 2012 | Central American and Caribbean Junior Championships (U20) | San Salvador, El Salvador | 1st | 100 m | 11.53 (wind: -1.0 m/s) |
| 2012 | Central American and Caribbean Junior Championships (U20) | San Salvador, El Salvador | 1st | 200 m | 23.79 (wind: -1.7 m/s) |
| 2012 | Central American and Caribbean Junior Championships (U20) | San Salvador, El Salvador | 3rd | 4 × 400 m relay | 3:54.06 |
| 2012 | World Junior Championships | Barcelona, Spain | 7th | 100 m | 11.58 (wind: +1.7 m/s) |
| 2012 | World Junior Championships | Barcelona, Spain | 16th (sf) | 200 m | 24.15 (wind: -2.4 m/s) |
| 2013 | Central American and Caribbean Championships | Morelia, Mexico | 4th | 100m | 11.41 A (wind: +0.1 m/s) |
| 2013 | Central American and Caribbean Championships | Morelia, Mexico | 4th | 4 × 100 m relay | 44.12 A |
| 2013 | World Championships | Moscow, Russia | 14th (h) | 4 × 100 m relay | 43.28 |
| 2014 | World Relays | Nassau, Bahamas | 15th (h)^{2} | 4 × 100 m relay | 44.30 |
| 2014 | Ibero-American Championships | São Paulo, Brazil | 7th | 100 m | 11.97 (wind: 0.0 m/s) |
| 2014 | Ibero-American Championships | São Paulo, Brazil | 5th (h)^{3} | 200 m | 24.62 (wind: -0.7 m/s) |
| 2014 | Ibero-American Championships | São Paulo, Brazil | 2nd | 4 × 100 m relay | 46.58 |
| 2014 | Central American and Caribbean Games | Xalapa, Mexico | 5th (h) | 100m | 11.83 A (wind: -0.4 m/s) |
| 2014 | Central American and Caribbean Games | Xalapa, Mexico | 5th | 4 × 100 m relay | 44.68 A |
| 2014 | Central American and Caribbean Games | Xalapa, Mexico | 5th | 4 × 400 m relay | 3:41.57 A |

^{1}: Irregular mark: Wind gauge malfunction.
^{2}: Disqualified in the B Final.
^{3}: Disqualified in the final.
