= Loudia Laarman =

Canadian sprinter (born 1991)

Personal information
- Nationality: Canada
- Born: October 4, 1991 (age 34) Haiti

Sport
- Sport: Running
- Events: 100 metres, 200 metres, 4×400 m relay
- College team: USC Trojans

Achievements and titles
- Personal bests: 100m: 11.47 (Austin, 2011); 200m: 23.58 (Walnut, 2014)
Medal record
Women's athletics
Representing Canada
World Youth Championships
Bronze medal – third place	2007 Ostrava	4×100 m relay
Commonwealth Youth Games
Bronze medal – third place	2008 Pune, India	4×100 m relay
Canada Games
Gold medal – first place	2009 Charlottetown	100 metres

Loudia Laarman (born October 4, 1991) is a Canadian sprinter of Caribbean origin who specializes in the 100 metres, 200 metres and 4×100 m relay. She participated in the 2007 World Youth Championships in Athletics, winning a bronze medal in the 4×100 m relay.

A native of Haiti, Loudia Laarman attended Winston Churchill High School in Lethbridge, Alberta. While in Alberta she set the junior provincial records in the 100, the 60 and the 50 metres, with respectively 11.64, 7.41 and 6.48 s. She ranked 7th with a time of 11.81 in the 100 metres event at the 2010 IAAF World Junior Championships in the Moncton 2010 Stadium, just 0.01 s behind German athlete Tatjana Pinto.

Loudia Laarman participated in the 100 metres event in the semifinals of the Pac-12 Conference Championships in Eugene, Oregon in May 2012 with a time of 11.62, placing 6th. She obtained All-America honors as member of her 4x100 m relay team, a team of the USC Trojans where she majored in kinesiology, placed seventh at the NCAA Championships in June 2012 and June 2013. At the 2012 Trojan Invitational her team finished second with a time of 44.64. At the same meet she placed second in the 100 metres event with a time of 11.83 and 10th in the 200 metres event with 24.11 s. Later that year her relay team set a seasonal best of 44.18.
