= Paul Dedewo =

Nigerian-American sprinter

Personal information
- Nationality: Nigerian (2011 - 2016); American (2017 - present)
- Born: June 5, 1991 (age 35)
- Home town: Bronx, New York
- Agent: Paul Doyle
- Height: 185 cm (6 ft 1 in)
- Weight: 73 kg (161 lb)
- Website: https://dedewo.medium.com/

Sport
- Sport: Athletics
- Event: 400 metres
- College team: City College of New York Beavers
- Club: Phoenix Track Club
- Coached by: Kevin Tyler

Achievements and titles
- Personal bests: 400 m: 44.43 (2018); 300 m: 31.92A (2017)
Medal record
Men's athletics
Representing United States
World Indoor Championships
Silver medal – second place	2018 Birmingham	4 × 400 m
World Relays
Silver medal – second place	2017 Nassau	mixed 4 × 400 m
Athletics World Cup
Gold medal – first place	2018 London	400 m

Paul Dedewo (born 5 June 1991) is a Nigerian-American 400 metres runner. He was the winner of the 2018 Athletics World Cup in the 400 m.

== Biography ==
Dedewo went to DeWitt Clinton High School in the Bronx and had a modest collegiate career competing for the City College of New York Beavers track and field team, an NCAA Division III school.

In 2016, Dedewo won the Athletics Federation of Nigeria national championships in the 400 metres with a time of 45.78, his first national title. Starting next year, Dedewo began representing the United States exclusively.

In 2017, Dedewo ran a time of 31.92 seconds for 300 metres to finish 2nd at the 2017 USA Indoor Track and Field Championships. As of 2023, his time is the 4th-fastest indoor 300 metres performance of all time, behind only Steven Gardiner, Wallace Spearmon, and race winner Noah Lyles.

In early 2018, Dedewo was part of the silver medal-winning United States team in the 4 × 400 metres relay at the World Indoor Championships. Later that year, Dedewo went on to win the inaugural Athletics World Cup in the individual 400 m.

== Statistics ==
=== Personal bests ===
Event	Mark	Competition	Venue	Date
400 metres	44.43	London Diamond League	London, United Kingdom	21 July 2018
300 metres	31.92i	2017 USA Indoor Track and Field Championships	Albuquerque, New Mexico	4 March 2017
