= Patrick Schneider =

German sprinter

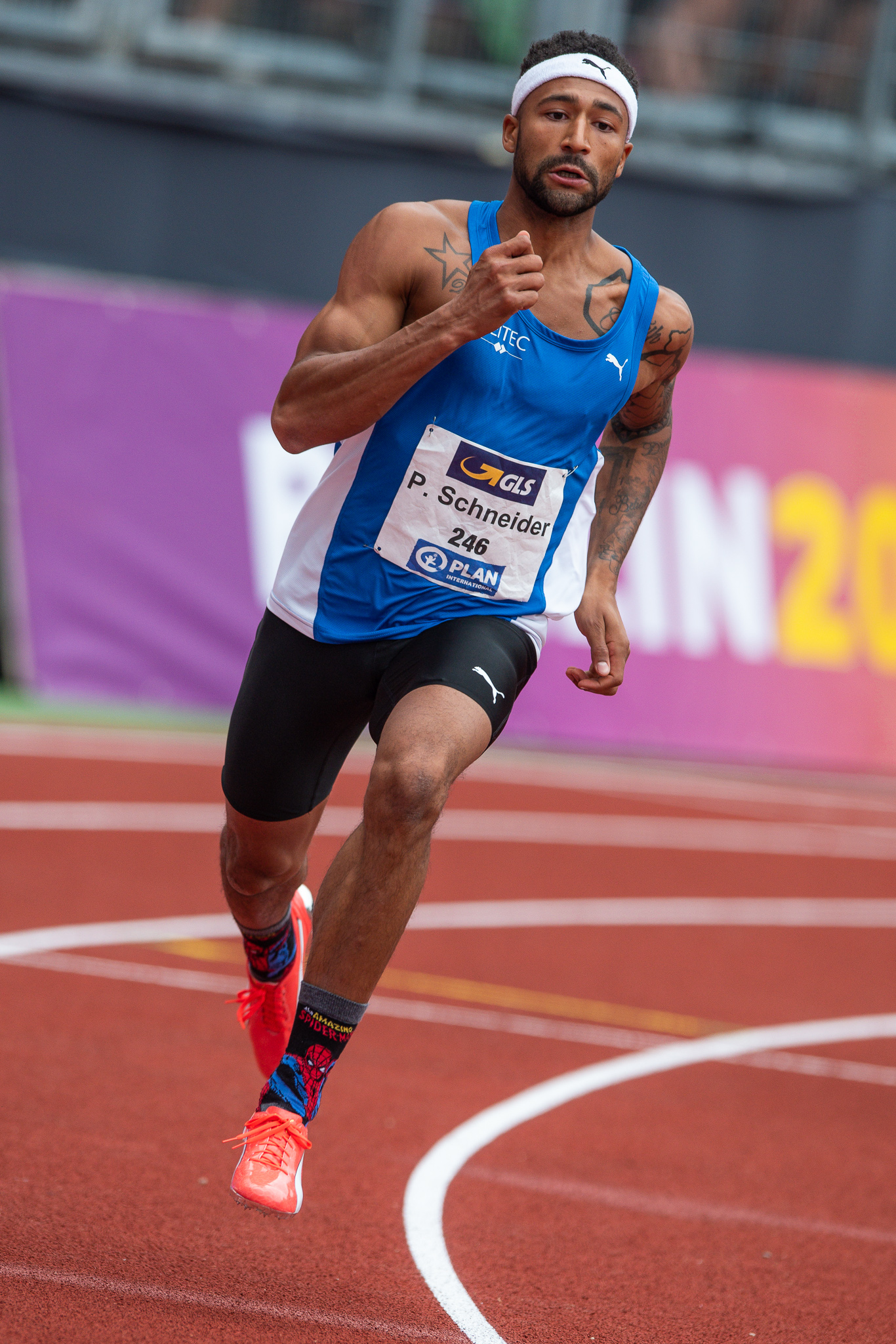
- Schneider in 2018

Personal information
- Born: 30 November 1992 (age 32) Ansbach, Bavaria, Germany
- Height: 1.80 m (5 ft 11 in)
- Weight: 73 kg (161 lb)

Sport
- Sport: Athletics
- Event: 400 metres
- Club: LAC Quelle Fürth
- Coached by: Harald Schmaus

Patrick Schneider (born 30 November 1992) is a German sprinter specialising in the 400 metres. He represented his country at two outdoor European Championships as well as the 2018 Athletics World Cup.

He switched from football to athletics in 2014.

== International competitions ==
Year	Competition	Venue	Position	Event	Notes
Representing Germany
2016	European Championships	Amsterdam, Netherlands	8th	4 × 400 m relay	3:05.67
2018	World Cup	London, United Kingdom	3rd	4 × 400 m relay	3:03.16
2018	European Championships	Berlin, Germany	24th (sf)	400 m	46.58
2018	European Championships	Berlin, Germany	8th	4 × 400 m relay	3:04.69
2019	World Relays	Yokohama, Japan	6th (B)	4 × 400 m relay	3:05.35
2022	World Indoor Championships	Belgrade, Serbia	12th (h)	400 m	46.76
2022	World Championships	Eugene, United States	11th (h)	4 × 400 m relay	3:04.21
2022	European Championships	Munich, Germany	15th (sf)	400 m	45.92
2022	European Championships	Munich, Germany	7th	4 × 400 m relay	3:02.51

== Personal bests ==
Outdoor

- 200 metres – 21.02 (+1.3 m/s, Heilbronn 2016)
- 400 metres – 45.82 (Nürnberg 2018)
- 800 metres – 1:49.54 (Neustadt 2016)

Indoor

- 200 metres – 21.73 (München 2018)
