= Dezerea Bryant =

American sprinter (born 1993)

Dezerea Bryant-Moore
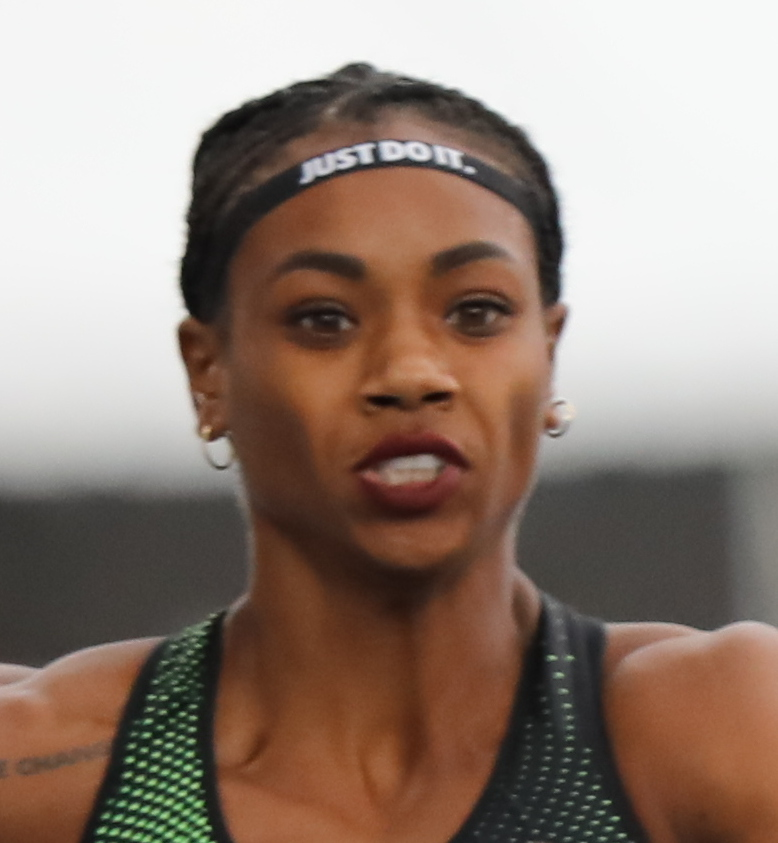
- Bryant at the 2018 U.S. Championships

Personal information
- Born: April 27, 1993 (age 33) Milwaukee, Wisconsin, U.S.
- Height: 5 ft 1 in (155 cm)
- Weight: 115 lb (52 kg)

Sport
- Sport: Track and field
- Event: Sprinting
- College team: University of Kentucky Wildcats (2014, 2015); Clemson University Tigers (2012, 2013)
- Club: Milwaukee Mustangs (Youth)
- Turned pro: 2015
- Coached by: Dennis Mitchell
- Retired: 2023

Achievements and titles
- Personal bests: 100 m: 10.99 s (Des Moines, 2018); 200 m: 22.18 s (Eugene, 2015)
Medal record
Women's track and field
Representing the United States
World Championships
Bronze medal – third place	2019 Doha	4×100 m relay
World Relays
Gold medal – first place	2019 Yokohama	4×100 m relay
Bronze medal – third place	2017 Nassau	4×200 m relay
NACAC Championships
Gold medal – first place	2018 Toronto	4×100 m relay
Gold medal – first place	2015 San José	4×100 m relay
Bronze medal – third place	2015 San José	200 m
World Junior Championships
Gold medal – first place	2012 Barcelona	4×100 m relay
Gold medal – first place	2010 Moncton	4×100 m relay
Bronze medal – third place	2012 Barcelona	200 m

Dezerea Bryant-Moore (born April 27, 1993) is an American sprinter competing in the 100 metres and 200 m. She was the 200 m national champion in 2019. At the 2019 World Athletics Championships in Doha, she placed 5th in the 200 m and earned a bronze medal in the Women's 4 × 100 m Relay. She has earned 17 NCAA Division I All-American honors and won the NCAA 200m championship in 2015 over The Bowerman Award Winner, Jenna Prandini. Bryant set a low-altitude collegiate record in 200 metres with 22.18.

== Professional Career ==
Dezerea Bryant-Moore became an assistant coach for the University of Maryland’s track and field team in August 2024. Following a successful career as a competitive athlete, she now manages the women's sprinters.

Dezerea Bryant-Moore spent that 2023-24 season coaching at the University of Delaware working with the sprint group.

In 2019, Bryant-Moore achieved notable success, earning the title of USA Track & Field 200-meter dash champion. At the World Championships in Doha, she secured a bronze medal in the 4x100-meter relay and a fifth-place finish in the 200 meter dash. Bryant-Moore also earned the distinction of being a finalist in the USA Olympic trials for the 200 meters in 2021, holding the 11th place rank globally for that year.

Before embarking on her professional journey, Bryant-Moore served as a volunteer assistant coach for two seasons (2015-17) with the University of Tennessee Tennessee Volunteers track and field program. During this tenure, she collaborated closely with coach Tim Hall, focusing on the sprints and relays event group.

== NCAA ==
Bryant was an 17-time NCAA Division I All-American (recognized by U.S. Track & Field and Cross Country Coaches Association) and 22-time all-conference sprinter.

=== Clemson ===
Bryant is a nine-time All-American and nine-time All-Atlantic Coast Conference in her first two collegiate seasons.

Year	ACC Indoor	NCAA Division I National Indoor Track and Field Championships	ACC Outdoor	NCAA Division I National Outdoor Track and Field Championships
2012	7.25; 1st 23.26; 1st	7.28; 6th 23.36; 7th	11.29; 1st 23.05; 1st 43.58; 1st	23.08; 12th 43.52; 3rd
2013	7.27; 1st 23.22; 1st	7.24; 4th 23.00; 4th	11.42; 1st 23.21; 2nd 43.59; 1st	11.27 (w); 9th 22.54 (w); 5th 43.76; 3rd

=== Kentucky ===
Bryant-Moore is a nine-time All-American at Kentucky and 13-time All-South eastern conference. Dezerea Bryant was inducted into the 2022 UK Hall of Fame.Watch Dezerea Bryant win 2015 NCAA Outdoor Track and Field Championships – Women's 200m

Year	SEC Indoor	NCAA Division I Indoor Track & Field Championships	SEC Outdoor	NCAA Division I Outdoor Track & Field Championships
2014	22.75; 2nd 7.16; 1st 3:36.65; 4th	7.12; 2nd 22.69; 1st 3:37.69; 12th	22.68; 2nd 11.24; 3rd 43.25; 2nd 3:34.93; 4th	3:39.09; 22nd
2015	7.18; 2nd 23.02; 2nd 3:31.43; 2nd	7.27; 7th 22.86; 3rd 3:33.17; 7th	22.65; 3rd 11.33; 4th 42.85; 3rd 3:34.38; 4th	11.01 (w); 3rd 22.18; 1st

== Professional ==
Dezerea Bryant worked two seasons as a Volunteer Assistant Coach with Tennessee's track and field team in 2015–2017. After a stellar collegiate sprinting career, Bryant worked with the Tennessee sprints and relays. In Fall 2017, Bryant moved to the training group in Florida.

== Statistics ==
Information from IAAF profile or Track & Field Results Reporting System unless otherwise noted.

=== Personal bests ===
- w = wind-assisted (over +2.0 m/s)

Event	Time	Wind (m/s)	Venue	Date	Notes
60 m	7.11	n/a	Albuquerque, New Mexico, U.S.	March 5, 2017	
100 m	10.99	+1.8	Des Moines, Iowa, U.S.	June 21, 2018	
100 m	10.96 w	+4.0	Austin, Texas, U.S.	May 3, 2014	Wind-assisted
200 m	22.18	+1.9	Eugene, Oregon, U.S.	June 13, 2015	
200 m indoor	22.69	n/a	Albuquerque, New Mexico, U.S.	March 14, 2014	
4×100 m relay	42.24	n/a	San José, Costa Rica	August 9, 2015	
4×200 m relay	1:30.87	n/a	Nassau, Bahamas	April 22, 2017	

=== Seasonal bests ===
- w = wind-assisted (over +2.0 m/s)

==== 100 m ====
Year	Time	Wind (m/s)	Venue	Date
2009	11.76 w	+2.1	La Crosse, Wisconsin, U.S.	June 5
2009	11.86	0.0	Des Moines, Iowa, U.S.	August 5
2010	11.59	+0.1	Des Moines, Iowa, U.S.	June 24
2010	11.59	+1.6	Norfolk, Virginia, U.S.	August 4
2011	11.38	+0.3	La Crosse, Wisconsin, U.S.	June 4
2012	11.29	+1.0	Charlottesville, Virginia, U.S.	April 21
2013	11.20	+2.0	Des Moines, Iowa, U.S.	June 21
2014	10.96 w	+4.0	Austin, Texas, U.S.	May 3
2014	11.24	+1.3	Lexington, Kentucky, U.S.	May 18
2015	10.99 w	+3.0	Eugene, Oregon, U.S.	June 11
2015	11.00	+1.5	Eugene, Oregon, U.S.	June 26
2016	11.23 w	+3.5	Baton Rouge, Louisiana, U.S.	April 23
2017	11.27	−0.4	Baie-Mahault, Guadeloupe	May 17
2017	11.20 w	+2.1	Eugene, Oregon, U.S.	May 27
2018	10.99	+1.8	Des Moines, Iowa, U.S.	June 21
2019	11.04 w	+3.4	Clermont, Florida, U.S.	April 20
2019	11.09	+1.0	Montverde, Florida, U.S.	July 6
2021	11.03 w	+2.5	Eugene, Oregon, U.S.	June 19
2021	11.09	+0.8	Eugene, Oregon, U.S.	June 18

==== 200 m ====
Year	Time	Wind (m/s)	Venue	Date
2009	23.94 w	+2.4	Des Moines, Iowa, U.S.	August 1
2009	24.02	−1.1	Des Moines, Iowa, U.S.	August 1
2009	24.02	−4.6	Des Moines, Iowa, U.S.	August 1
2010	23.51	+1.7	Norfolk, Virginia, U.S.	August 5
2011	23.01	−0.4	La Crosse, Wisconsin, U.S.	June 4
2012	22.97	+0.1	Jacksonville, Florida, U.S.	May 26
2013	22.54 w	+3.5	Eugene, Oregon, U.S.	June 8
2013	22.87	−1.1	Des Moines, Iowa, U.S.	June 23
2014	22.68	−0.8	Lexington, Kentucky, U.S.	May 18
2015	22.18	+1.9	Eugene, Oregon, U.S.	June 13
2016	23.07	+0.4	Tallahassee, Florida, U.S.	April 16
2017	22.95	+0.3	Kingston, Jamaica	June 10
2018	22.93	−0.4	Gainesville, Florida, U.S.	April 13
2019	22.47	−1.2	Des Moines, Iowa, U.S.	July 28
2021	22.24	+1.3	Eugene, Oregon, U.S.	June 26

=== International championship results ===
- PB = personal best

Year	Championship	Position	Event	Venue	Notes
Representing the United States
2010	World Junior Championships	1st	4×100 m relay	Moncton, New Brunswick, Canada	43.44, PB
2012	World Junior Championships	11th	100 m	Barcelona, Spain	11.77
2012	World Junior Championships	3rd	200 m	Barcelona, Spain	23.15
2012	World Junior Championships	1st	4×100 m relay	Barcelona, Spain	43.89
2015	NACAC Championships	3rd	200 m	San José, Costa Rica	22.58
2015	NACAC Championships	1st	4×100 m relay	San José, Costa Rica	42.24, PB
2017	World Relays	3rd	4×200 m relay	Nassau, Bahamas	1:30.87, PB
2018	Athletics World Cup (Note: Not to be confused with the IAAF World Cup, which is now known as the Continental Cup.)	DNF	4×100 m relay	London, England	Teammate injured
2018	NACAC Championships	1st	4×100 m relay	Toronto, Ontario, Canada	42.50
2019	World Relays	1st	4×100 m relay	Yokohama, Japan	43.27

=== National championship results ===
- PB = personal best
- w = wind-assisted (over +2.0 m/s)
- Q = qualified for the next round

Year	Championship	Position	Event	Venue	Notes
Representing the Milwaukee Mustangs Track Club
2010	U.S. Junior Championships	5th	100 m	Des Moines, Iowa	11.66
2010	U.S. Junior Championships	3rd	200 m	Des Moines, Iowa	23.73
Representing the Clemson Tigers
2012	NCAA Division I Indoor Championships	7th	200 m	Nampa, Idaho	23.36
2012	NCAA Division I Indoor Championships	6th	60 m	Nampa, Idaho	7.28
2012	NCAA Division I Championships	12th	200 m	Des Moines, Iowa	23.08
2012	NCAA Division I Championships	3rd	4×100 m relay	Des Moines, Iowa	43.52
2012	U.S. Junior Championships	1st	100 m	Bloomington, Indiana	11.43
2012	U.S. Junior Championships	2nd	200 m	Bloomington, Indiana	23.30
2013	NCAA Division I Indoor Championships	5th	200 m	Fayetteville, Arkansas	23.00, indoor PB
2013	NCAA Division I Indoor Championships	4th	60 m	Fayetteville, Arkansas	7.24
2013	NCAA Division I Championships	9th	100 m	Eugene, Oregon	11.27 w, wind-assisted
2013	NCAA Division I Championships	5th	200 m	Eugene, Oregon	22.54 w, wind-assisted
2013	NCAA Division I Championships	3rd	4×100 m relay	Eugene, Oregon	43.76
2013	U.S. Championships	16th	100 m	Des Moines, Iowa	11.20, PB
2013	U.S. Championships	10th	200 m	Des Moines, Iowa	22.87
Representing the Kentucky Wildcats
2014	NCAA Division I Indoor Championships	1st	200 m	Albuquerque, New Mexico	22.69, PB
2014	NCAA Division I Indoor Championships	2nd	60 m	Albuquerque, New Mexico	7.12, PB
2014	NCAA Division I Indoor Championships	12th	4×400 m relay	Albuquerque, New Mexico	3:37.69
2015	NCAA Division I Indoor Championships	7th	60 m	Fayetteville, Arkansas	7.27
2015	NCAA Division I Indoor Championships	3rd	200 m	Fayetteville, Arkansas	22.86
2015	NCAA Division I Indoor Championships	7th	4×400 m relay	Fayetteville, Arkansas	3:33.17
2015	NCAA Division I Championships	3rd	100 m	Eugene, Oregon	11.01 w, wind-assisted
2015	NCAA Division I Championships	1st	200 m	Eugene, Oregon	22.18, PB
2015	U.S. Championships	8th	100 m	Eugene, Oregon	11.08
2015	U.S. Championships	5th	200 m	Eugene, Oregon	22.48
Representing Nike
2016	U.S. Indoor Championships	6th	60 m	Portland, Oregon	7.24
2017	U.S. Indoor Championships	2nd	60 m	Albuquerque, New Mexico	7.11, PB
2017	U.S. Championships	28th	100 m	Sacramento, California	11.42
2017	U.S. Championships	13th	200 m	Sacramento, California	23.25
2018	U.S. Indoor Championships	3rd (semi 3)	60 m	Albuquerque, New Mexico	7.39, Q (Note: Qualified for the final, but did not run in the final.)
2018	U.S. Championships	6th	100 m	Des Moines, Iowa	11.17
2019	U.S. Championships	4th	100 m	Des Moines, Iowa	11.29
2019	U.S. Championships	1st	200 m	Des Moines, Iowa	22.47
2021	2020 United States Olympic Trials	9th	100 m	Eugene, Oregon	11.03
2021	2020 United States Olympic Trials	6th	200 m	Eugene, Oregon	22.24

=== Diamond League ===
Year	Meet	Event	Time
2015	Diamond League Lausanne	200 metres	22.63
2021	Diamond League Monaco	200 m	22.79 +0.7
2021	Diamond League Gateshead	200 m	22.95 +0.2
2021	Diamond League Zürich; Final	200 m	22.99 +0.6

== World ranking ==
Dezerea Bryant was ranked tenth in 200 metres in 2015. Bryant was ranked 13th in 200 metres in 2021.
