= Derrick Mokaleng =

South African sprinter

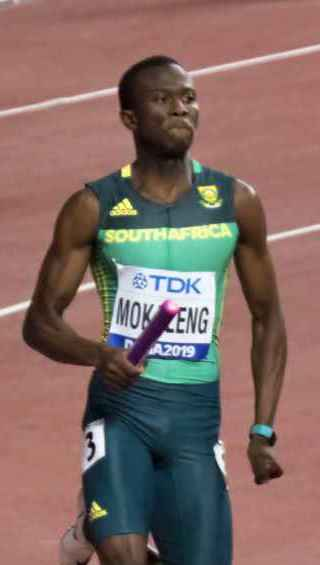
- Mokaleng in 2019

Personal information
- Born: 18 June 1997 (age 29)
- Education: University of Johannesburg; Texas Christian University

Sport
- Sport: Athletics
- Event: 400 metres
- College team: TCU Horned Frogs

Derrick Mokaleng (born 18 June 1997) is a South African sprinter specialising in the 400 metres. He represented his country at the 2019 World Championships narrowly missing the semifinals.

In 2019, he won the silver medal in the men's 4 × 400 metres relay at the 2019 African Games held in Rabat, Morocco.

Mokaleng majored in entrepreneurial management at Texas Christian University. He was an All-American for the TCU Horned Frogs track and field team, placing 7th in the 400 metres at the 2018 NCAA Division I Indoor Track and Field Championships. Mokaleng also set a collegiate leader in the indoor 400 m in 2018 and ran the then-second-fastest collegiate indoor 600 yards time in history.

== International competitions ==
Year	Competition	Venue	Position	Event	Notes
Representing South Africa
2016	World U20 Championships	Bydgoszcz, Poland	29th (h)	400 m	48.04
2018	World Cup	London, United Kingdom	2nd	400 m	45.48
2018	World Cup	London, United Kingdom	–	4 × 400 m relay	DQ
2019	African Games	Rabat, Morocco	12th (sf)	400 m	46.67
2019	African Games	Rabat, Morocco	4th (h)	4 × 100 m relay	39.76
2019	African Games	Rabat, Morocco	2nd	4 × 400 m relay	3:03.18
2019	World Championships	Doha, Qatar	23rd (h)	400 m	45.87

== Personal bests ==
Outdoor

- 200 metres – 20.86 (+0.6 m/s, Fort Worth 2018)
- 400 metres – 45.02 (Waco 2018)

Indoor

- 400 metres – 45.67 (Lubbock 2019) NR
