= 2017 IAAF World Relays – Mixed 4 × 400 metres relay =

International relay competition

Mixed 4 × 400 metres relay at the 2017 IAAF World Relays
- Venue: Thomas Robinson Stadium
- Dates: 23 April (final)
- Competitors: 32 from 8 nations

Medalists
gold medal	Steven Gardiner; Shaunae Miller; Anthonique Strachan; Michael Mathieu	Bahamas
silver medal	Michael Berry; Jaide Stepter; Paul Dedewo; Claudia Francis	United States
bronze medal	Javere Bell; Ristananna Tracey; Natoya Goule; Jamari Rose	Jamaica

The Mixed 4 × 400 metres relay at the 2017 IAAF World Relays was held at the Thomas Robinson Stadium on 22 April. It was the first time that this event was held at the IAAF World Relays or indeed any senior level major international competition. Each team had to comprise two men and two women but could line them up in any order.

== Schedule ==
Date	Time	Round
23 April 2017	22:52	Final

All times are local times (UTC-4)

== Results ==
=== Final ===
Rank	Lane	Nation	Athletes	Time	Points
1st place, gold medalist(s)	4	Bahamas	Steven Gardiner (M), Shaunae Miller (W), Anthonique Strachan (W), Michael Mathieu (M)	3:14.42	8
2nd place, silver medalist(s)	5	United States	Michael Berry (M), Jaide Stepter (W), Paul Dedewo (M), Claudia Francis (W)	3:17.29	7
3rd place, bronze medalist(s)	6	Jamaica	Javere Bell (M), Ristananna Tracey (W), Natoya Goule (W), Jamari Rose (M)	3:20.26	6
4	3	Poland	Kacper Kozłowski (M), Martyna Dąbrowska (W), Małgorzata Curyło (W), Rafał Omelko (M)	3:22.26	5
5	2	Australia	Mason Cohen (M), Alicia Keir (W), Ella Nelson (W), Josh Ralph (M)	3:23.14	4
6	7	Kenya	Alphas Kishoyian (M), Jacinter Shikanda (W), Boniface Mweresa (W), Veronica Mutua (M)	3:23.79	3
7	1	Trinidad and Tobago	Jarrin Solomon (M), Domonique Williams (W), Emmanuel Callender (M), Chelsea Charles (W)	3:25.49	2
	8	Botswana	Leaname Maotoanong (M), Goitseone Seleka (W), Boitumelo Masilo (M), Loungo Matlhaku (W)	DNF	0
