= Anthonique Strachan =

Bahamian sprinter

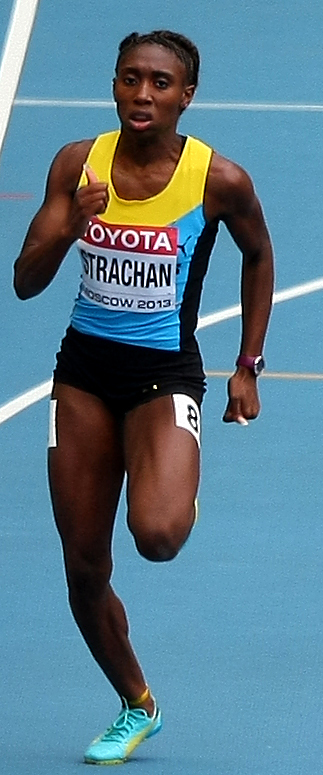
- Strachan in 2013

Personal information
- Born: 22 August 1993 (age 33) Nassau, Bahamas
- Height: 5 ft 6 in (168 cm)
- Weight: 138 lb (63 kg)

Sport
- Country: Bahamas
- Sport: Track & Field
- Events: 100 metres, 200 metres
- Club: Club Monica Athletics

Achievements and titles
- Personal bests: 100 m: 10.92 (Oslo 2023); 200 m: 22.15 (Rabat 2023)
Medal record
Women's athletics
Representing the Bahamas
World Relay Championships
Gold medal – first place	2017 Nassau	4×400 m relay
NACAC Championships
Gold medal – first place	2025 Freeport	200 m
Silver medal – second place	2022 Freeport	4x100 m relay
CAC Championships
Silver medal – second place	2011 Mayagüez	200 m
Bronze medal – third place	2011 Mayagüez	4×100 m relay
World Junior Championships
Gold medal – first place	2012 Barcelona	100 m
Gold medal – first place	2012 Barcelona	200 m
Pan American Junior Championships
Gold medal – first place	2011 Miramar	200 m
Gold medal – first place	2011 Miramar	4×100 m relay
Bronze medal – third place	2011 Miramar	4×400 m relay
Bronze medal – third place	2011 Miramar	100 m
CAC Junior Championships (Junior)
Bronze medal – third place	2010 Santo Domingo	4×400 m relay
CARIFTA Games (Junior)
Gold medal – first place	2011 Montego Bay	100 m
Gold medal – first place	2011 Montego Bay	200 m
Gold medal – first place	2012 Hamilton	100 m
Gold medal – first place	2012 Hamilton	200 m
Gold medal – first place	2012 Hamilton	4×100 m relay
Silver medal – second place	2010 George Town	4×100 m relay
CARIFTA Games (Youth)
Silver medal – second place	2009 Vieux Fort	200 m
Bronze medal – third place	2009 Vieux Fort	4×100 m relay

Anthonique Strachan (/strɔːn/; born 22 August 1993) is a Bahamian sprinter, she is the 2012 100m and 200m World Junior Champion. She competed at the 2012 Summer Olympics, 2016 Summer Olympics and the 2020 Summer Olympics, in 200 m. and 4 × 400 m relay

== Career ==
She attended St. Augustine's College in Nassau, Bahamas, and trained with Club Monica Athletics. She trained in Auburn, Alabama under coach Henry Rolle who also coached Kerron Stewart, Darrel Brown and Marc Burns, before moving to Kingston, Jamaica to train with MVP Track and Field Club under coach Stephen Francis.

At the 2011 CARIFTA Games, she won two gold medals (100 metres in 11.38s (−0.8 m/s), and 200 metres in 23.17s (0.0 m/s)) in the junior (U-20) category equalling Veronica Campbell's 200 metres games record of 22.93s (1.1 m/s) in the heats. She was consequently awarded the Austin Sealy Trophy for the most outstanding athlete of the games.

Strachan won gold medals over 200 metres and 4×100 metres relay at the 2011 Pan American Junior Athletics Championships. Her 200 metres time of 22.70 was a new World Junior Leading and a new championship record.

At the 2012 CARIFTA Games, she won three gold medals: 100 metres in wind-assisted 11.22s (4.4 m/s), 200 metres, this year improving Veronica Campbell's and her own 200 metres games record to 22.85s (−0.7 m/s), and finally, she led the Bahamas 4 × 100 m relay team to gold in 45.02s. For the second time in the role, she was awarded the Austin Sealy Trophy for the most outstanding athlete of the games.

Strachan broke the 11 second barrier over 100m on 26 April in Kingston, Jamaica at the Wolmer Speedfest. Strachan placed first in a time of 10.99 (+0.5).

== Achievements ==
Year	Competition	Venue	Position	Event	Notes
Representing Bahamas
2009	CARIFTA Games (U-17)	Vieux Fort, Saint Lucia	2nd	200 m	23.95 (−0.4 m/s)
2009	CARIFTA Games (U-17)	Vieux Fort, Saint Lucia	3rd	4×100 m relay	47.04
2010	CARIFTA Games (U-20)	George Town, Cayman Islands	5th	200 m	24.57 (+0.5 m/s)
2010	CARIFTA Games (U-20)	George Town, Cayman Islands	2nd	4 × 100 m relay	45.59
2010	Central American and Caribbean; Junior Championships (U-20)	Santo Domingo, Dominican Republic	4th	200 m	24.19 (−1.3 m/s)
2010	Central American and Caribbean; Junior Championships (U-20)	Santo Domingo, Dominican Republic	—	400 m	DNF
2010	Central American and Caribbean; Junior Championships (U-20)	Santo Domingo, Dominican Republic	3rd	4 × 400 m relay	3:38.81
2010	World Junior Championships	Moncton, New Brunswick, Canada	12th (sf)	200m	23.99 (+1.8 m/s)
2011	CARIFTA Games (U-20)	Montego Bay, Jamaica	1st	100 m	11.38 (−0.8 m/s)
2011	CARIFTA Games (U-20)	Montego Bay, Jamaica	1st	200 m	23.17 (0.0 m/s)
2011	CARIFTA Games (U-20)	Montego Bay, Jamaica	—	4 × 100 m relay	DQ
2012	CARIFTA Games (U-20)	Hamilton, Bermuda	1st	100 m	11.22 (+4.4 m/s)
2012	CARIFTA Games (U-20)	Hamilton, Bermuda	1st	200 m	22.85 (−0.7 m/s) CR
2012	CARIFTA Games (U-20)	Hamilton, Bermuda	1st	4 × 100 m relay	45.02
2012	World Junior Championships	Barcelona, Spain	1st	100 m	11.20 (+1.7 m/s) WJL
2012	World Junior Championships	Barcelona, Spain	1st	200 m	22.53 (+0.2 m/s) WJL, CR
2012	World Junior Championships	Barcelona, Spain	—	4 × 100 m relay	DNF
2012	Olympic Games	London, United Kingdom	15th (sf)	200 m	22.82 (+1.0 m/s)
2012	Olympic Games	London, United Kingdom	9th (h)	4 × 100 m relay	43.07
2013	World Championships	Moscow, Russia	9th (sf)	200 m	22.81 (-0.2 m/s)
2014	World Relays	Nassau, Bahamas	9th (h)	4 × 100 m relay	43.54
2014	World Relays	Nassau, Bahamas	4th	4 × 200 m relay	1:31.31 NR
2014	Continental Cup	Marrakesh, Morocco	4th	200 m	22.73 (+0.3 m/s)
2015	World Relays	Nassau, Bahamas	—	4 × 200 m relay	DQ
2015	Pan American Games	Toronto, Canada	6th (sf)	200 m	22.79^{1} (+1.1 m/s)
2016	Olympic Games	Rio de Janeiro, Brazil	26th (h)	200 m	22.96 (-0.1 m/s)
2016	Olympic Games	Rio de Janeiro, Brazil	11th (h)	4 × 400 m relay	3:26.36 NR
2017	World Relays	Nassau, Bahamas	10th (h)	4 × 400 m relay	3:34.40
2017	World Relays	Nassau, Bahamas	1st	4 × 400 m relay mixed	3:14.42 NR
2017	World Championships	London, United Kingdom	17th (sf)	200 m	23.21 (-0.2 m/s)
2017	World Championships	London, United Kingdom	—	4 × 400 m relay	DNF
2018	Commonwealth Games	Gold Coast, Australia	15th (sf)	200 m	23.62 (0.0 m/s)
2019	Pan American Games	Lima, Peru	5th	200 m	22.97 (-0.1 m/s)
2019	World Championships	Doha, Qatar	23rd (sf)	200 m	25.44 (+0.5 m/s)
2021	Olympic Games	Tokyo, Japan	11th (sf)	200 m	22.56 (+0.3 m/s)
2021	Olympic Games	Tokyo, Japan	—	4 × 400 m relay	DNF
2022	World Indoor Championships	Belgrade, Serbia	13th (sf)	60 m	7.17 PB
2022	World Championships	Eugene, United States	10th (sf)	100 m	10.98 PB (-0.2 m/s)
2022	World Championships	Eugene, United States	44th (h)	200 m	1:50.06 (+1.9 m/s)
2022	NACAC Championships	Freeport, Bahamas	9th (h)	100 m	11.48 (-1.5 m/s)
2022	NACAC Championships	Freeport, Bahamas	2nd	4 × 100 m relay	43.34
2023	World Championships	Budapest, Hungary	6th	200 m	22.29 (+0.1 m/s)
2024	World Indoor Championships	Glasgow, United Kingdom	23rd (sf)	60 m	7.36
2025	NACAC Championships	Freeport, Bahamas	1st	200 m	22.77
2025	World Championships	Tokyo, Japan	8th (sf)	200 m	22.48^{2}
2026	Commonwealth Games	Glasgow, United Kingdom	18th (sf)	200 m	23.66

^{1}Did not finish in the final.
^{2}Disqualified in the final.
