= Ramone Bailey =

Jamaican long jumper

Personal information
- Born: October 31, 1991 (age 34) Kingston, Jamaica

Sport
- Sport: Long jump
Medal record
Men's athletics
Representing Jamaica
Central American and Caribbean Games
Gold medal – first place	2018 Barranquilla	Long jump
NACAC Championships
Bronze medal – third place	2018 Toronto	Long jump

Ramone Bailey (born 31 October 1991) is a Jamaican long jumper.

He won the gold medal at the 2018 Central American and Caribbean Games and the bronze medal at the 2018 NACAC Championships. He also competed at the 2017 World Championships without reaching the final.

His personal best jump is 8.17 metres as recorded by the IAAF, albeit lacking wind information, achieved in June 2017 in Kingston.
