= David Sharpe (swimmer) =

Canadian competition swimmer (born 1990)

Personal information
- Full name: David Sharpe
- National team: Canada
- Born: October 29, 1990 (age 35) Halifax, Nova Scotia
- Height: 1.78 m (5 ft 10 in)
- Weight: 73 kg (161 lb)

Sport
- Sport: Swimming
- Strokes: Butterfly
- Club: Halifax Trojan Aquatic Club
- College team: Dalhousie University

David Sharpe (born October 29, 1990) is a Canadian competition swimmer. He competed in the 200 metre butterfly race at the 2012 Summer Olympics, in London, United Kingdom. His time of 1:59.87 in the heats did not qualify him for the semifinals.
