= Anna Hämäläinen =

Finnish sprinter

Personal information
- Full name: Anna Hämäläinen
- Born: 24 March 1994 (age 32) Moscow, Russia

Sport
- Country: Finland
- Sport: Athletics
- Event: 200 metres

Achievements and titles
- Personal best(s): 200 m: 23.76 (Turku, August 2011)

Anna Hämäläinen (born 24 March 1994, in Moscow) is a Finnish athlete who specialises in the 200 metres. She comes from a sporting family, both her mother, Olga, and father, Eduard Hämäläinen, were athletes who each won medals at the European Athletics Championships.

Hämäläinen represented Finland at the 2012 European Athletics Championships where she finished 27th overall in the heats of the 200 metres with a sprint of 24.14 seconds.

== Achievements ==
Year	Competition	Venue	Position	Event	Notes
Representing Finland
2012	European Championships	Helsinki, Finland	27th (overall – heats)	200 m	24.14
2012	World Junior Championships	Barcelona, Spain	23rd (overall – semifinal)	200 m	24.50
