= Nimet Karakuş =

Turkish sprinter (born 1993)

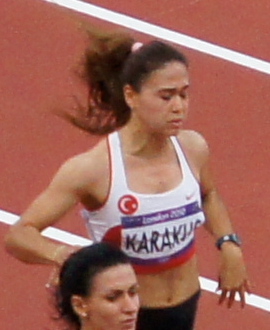
- Nimet Karakuş at the 2012 Summer Olympics

Personal information
- Nationality: Turkish
- Born: January 23, 1993 (age 33) Korkuteli, Antalya Province, Turkey
- Height: 1.68 m (5 ft 6 in)
- Weight: 64 kg (141 lb)

Sport
- Sport: Running
- Events: 100 m, 200 m
- Club: Fenerbahçe Athletics
- Coached by: Alper Başyiğit

Achievements and titles
- Personal bests: 100 m 11.33 (2012); 200 m 23.40 (2013)
Medal record
Women's Athletics
Representing Turkey
Islamic Solidarity Games
Silver medal – second place	2013 Palembang	100 m
Gold medal – first place	2013 Palembang	4×100 m relay
Mediterranean Games
Bronze medal – third place	2013 Mersin	200 m

Nimet Karakuş (born January 23, 1993, in Korkuteli, Antalya Province, Turkey) is a Turkish sprinter competing in the 100 m and 200 m events. The 1.68 m (5 ft 6 in) tall athlete at 64 kg (141 lb) is a member of Fenerbahçe Athletics, where she is coached by Alper Başyiğit.

== Career ==
Born to Bayram Karakuş and his wife Hatice in the outskirts of Antalya, she was discovered at the age of eleven as a sprinter. She won several races in her age category and became soon a national athlete.

She qualified to participate in the 100 m event at the 2012 Summer Olympics by improving her national record for juniors from 11.53 to 11.33.

AT the 2013 Islamic Solidarity Games held in Palembang, Indonesia, Karakuş won a silver medal in the 100 m event and a gold medal in the 4 × 100 m relay with her teammates Saliha Özyurt, Birsen Engin and Sema Apak.

== Achievements ==
Year	Competition	Venue	Position	Event	Notes
2008	International Youth Match	Antalya, Turkey	5th	100 m	12.67 J
2008	International Youth Match	Antalya, Turkey	5th	200 m	26.56 J
2010	Balkan Youth Championships	Edirne, Turkey	2nd	100 m	12.25 J
2010	Balkan Youth Championships	Edirne, Turkey	2nd	4 × 100 m	48.27 J
2010	World Junior Championships	Moncton, New Brunswick, Canada	30th (h)	100m	12.33 (wind: +0.3 m/s)
2010	World Junior Championships	Moncton, New Brunswick, Canada	22nd (sf)	200m	24.36 (wind: +1.6 m/s)
2012	Balkan Junior Championships	Eskişehir, Turkey	1st	100 m	11.33 J
2012	World Junior Championships	Barcelona, Spain	2nd	100 m	11.36 J
2013	17th Mediterranean Games	Mersin, Turkey	3rd	200 m	23.40
2013	3rd Islamic Solidarity Games	Palembang, Indonesia	2nd	100 m	12.11
2013	3rd Islamic Solidarity Games	Palembang, Indonesia	1st	4 × 100 m relay	46.59
