= 2010 World Junior Championships in Athletics – Women's 4 × 100 metres relay =

The women's 4x100 metres relay event at the 2010 World Junior Championships in Athletics was held in Moncton, New Brunswick, Canada, at Moncton Stadium on 23 and 24 July.

== Medalists ==
Gold	Stormy Kendrick; Takeia Pinckney; Dezerea Bryant; Ashley Collier; United States
Silver	Nadja Bahl; Leena Günther; Tatjana Pinto; Stefanie Pähler; Germany
Bronze	Dafne Schippers; Loreanne Kuhurima; Eva Lubbers; Jamile Samuel; Netherlands

== Results ==
=== Final ===
24 July

Rank	Nation	Competitors	Time	Notes
1st place, gold medalist(s)	United States	Stormy Kendrick; Takeia Pinckney; Dezerea Bryant; Ashley Collier	43.44	
2nd place, silver medalist(s)	Germany	Nadja Bahl; Leena Günther; Tatjana Pinto; Stefanie Pähler	43.74	
3rd place, bronze medalist(s)	Netherlands	Dafne Schippers; Loreanne Kuhurima; Eva Lubbers; Jamile Samuel	44.09	
4	Jamaica	Siedatha Palmer; Deandre Whitehorne; Diandre Gilbert; Danielle Williams	44.24	
5	Nigeria	Florence Nkiruka; Bukola Abogunloko; Margaret Etim; Stella Silas	44.84	
6	Canada	Crystal Emmanuel; Janelle Bell-Spence; Leah Walkeden; Loudia Laarman	44.84	
7	Australia	Rosie Lawson; Ella Nelson; Karlie Morton; Caitlin Sargent	45.57	
	United Kingdom	Rebekah Wilson; Jodie Williams; Emily Diamond; Shaunna Thompson	DNF	

=== Heats ===
23 July

==== Heat 1 ====
Rank	Nation	Competitors	Time	Notes
1	Germany	Nadja Bahl; Leena Günther; Tatjana Pinto; Stefanie Pähler	44.52	Q
2	Jamaica	Siedatha Palmer; Deandre Whitehorne; Diandre Gilbert; Shericka Jackson	44.68	Q
3	Netherlands	Janice Babel; Loreanne Kuhurima; Eva Lubbers; Jamile Samuel	44.70	Q
4	Nigeria	Stella Silas; Florence Nkiruka; Betty Jethro; Margaret Etim	45.19	q
5	Australia	Rosie Lawson; Ella Nelson; Karlie Morton; Caitlin Sargent	45.41	q
6	Hungary	Anasztázia Nguyen; Kriszta Komiszár; Gréta Kerekes; Fanni Schmelcz	45.77	
7	Japan	Aoi Kawasaki; Nodoka Seko; Kana Ichikawa; Narumi Tashiro	45.78	

==== Heat 2 ====
Rank	Nation	Competitors	Time	Notes
1	United States	Stormy Kendrick; Takeia Pinckney; Dezerea Bryant; Ashley Collier	43.56	Q
2	United Kingdom	Rebekah Wilson; Jennie Batten; Twinelle Hopeson; Shaunna Thompson	44.62	Q
3	Canada	Crystal Emmanuel; Janelle Bell-Spence; Leah Walkeden; Loudia Laarman	44.77	Q
4	Bahamas	V'Alonnee Robinson; Ivanique Kemp; Marvar Etienne; Tynia Gaither	45.45	
5	Poland	Klaudia Konopko; Katarzyna Sokólska; Ewelina Skoczylas; Martyna Opoń	45.54	
6	France	Orlann Ombissa; Jessie Saint-Marc; Jennifer Galais; Orphée Neola	45.70	
7	Spain	Caridad Jerez; Maitane Iruretagoyena; María Martín-Sacristán; María Cabeza Navas	46.36	

== Participation ==
According to an unofficial count, 61 athletes from 14 countries participated in the event.

- Australia (4)
- Bahamas (4)
- Canada (4)
- France (4)
- Germany (4)
- Hungary (4)
- Jamaica (5)
- Japan (4)
- Netherlands (5)
- Nigeria (5)
- Poland (4)
- Spain (4)
- United Kingdom (6)
- United States (4)
