= 2018 in 100 metres =

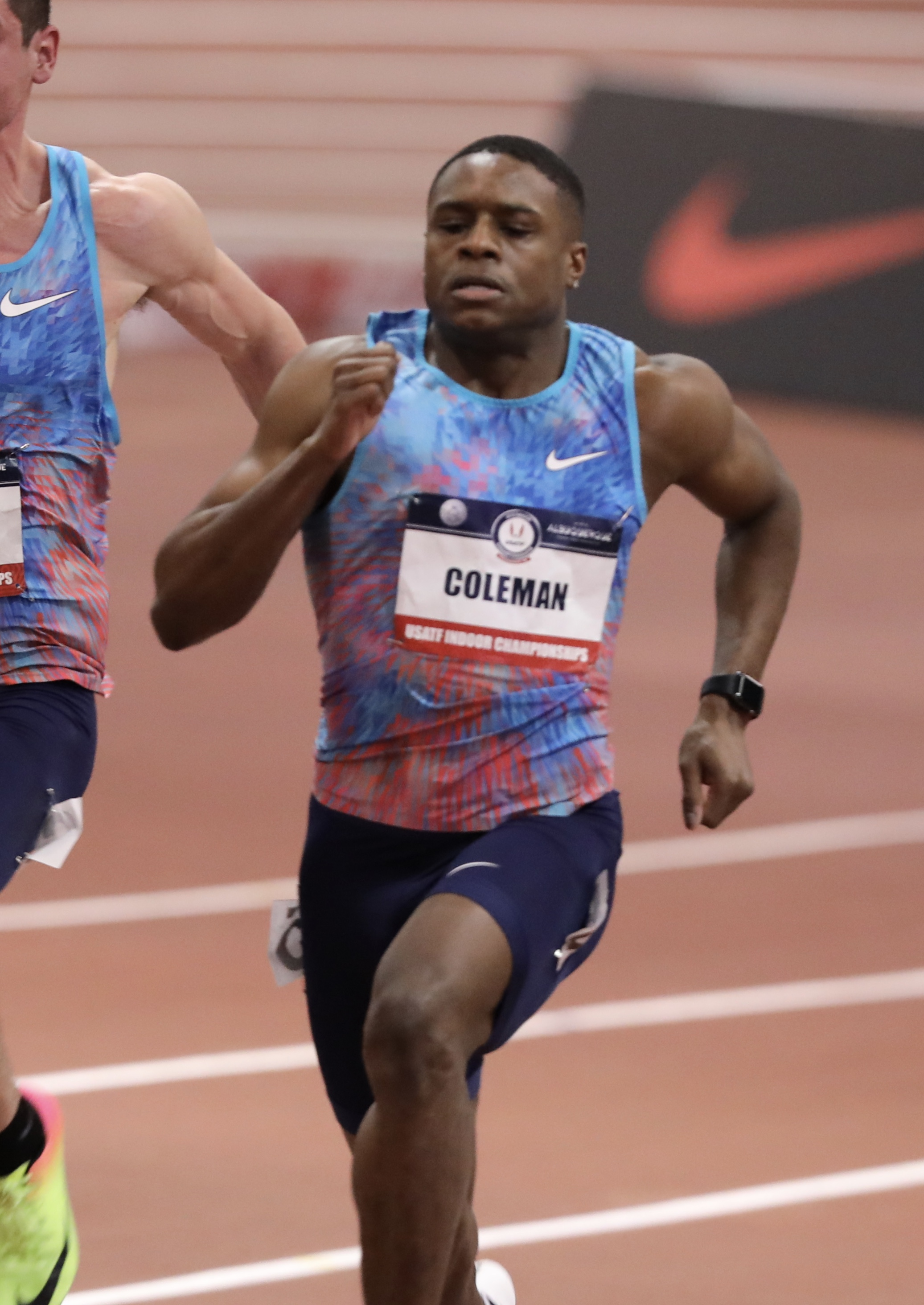
The American Christian Coleman, World Leader (WL) in 100 metres 2018 men's outdoor season.

2018 in 100 metres lists the World Best Year Performance in the year 2018 in both the men's and the women's 100 metres.

== Records ==
Standing records prior to the 2018 season
Men's World record	Usain Bolt (JAM)	9.58	Berlin, Germany	16 August 2009
Women's World record	Florence Griffith Joyner (USA)	10.49	Indianapolis, United States	16 July 1988

== Men top 60 ==
#	Time	Wind	Athlete	Country	Venue	Date
1	9.79	-0.3	Christian Coleman	United States	Boudewijnstadion, Bruxelles (BEL)	31 August 2018
2	9.87	-0.1	Ronnie Baker	United States	Stadion Śląski, Chorzów (POL)	22 August 2018
3	9.88	+1.1	Noah Lyles	United States	Drake Stadium, Des Moines, IA (USA)	22 June 2018
4	9.89	+1.4	Michael Rodgers	United States	Drake Stadium, Des Moines, IA (USA)	21 June 2018
5	9.91	+0.4	Zharnel Hughes	United Kingdom	Kingston (JAM)	09 June 2018
5	9.91	+0.2	Bingtian Su	China	Moratalaz, Madrid (ESP)	22 June 2018
5	9.91	+0.8	Jimmy Vicaut	France	Stade Charléty, Paris (FRA)	30 June 2018
8	9.92	+0.7	Isiah Young	United States	Montverde, FL (USA)	09 June 2018
9	9.93	+1.4	Cameron Burrell	United States	Drake Stadium, Des Moines, IA (USA)	21 June 2018
9	9.93	+0.2	Akani Simbine	South Africa	Olympic Stadium, London (GBR)	21 July 2018
11	9.94	-0.2	Arthur Cissé	Ivory Coast	Leverkusen (GER)	16 June 2018
11	9.94	-0.5	Reece Prescod	United Kingdom	Alexander Stadium, Birmingham (GBR)	18 August 2018
11	9.94	-0.3	Yohan Blake	Jamaica	Boudewijnstadion, Bruxelles (BEL)	31 August 2018
14	9.96	+0.2	Tyquendo Tracey	Jamaica	Olympic Stadium, London (GBR)	21 July 2018
15	9.97	+0.9	Jaylen Bacon	United States	Sacramento, CA (USA)	25 May 2018
15	9.97	+0.9	Zhenye Xie	China	Montreuil (FRA)	19 June 2018
15	9.97	+1.7	Barakat Al Harthi	Oman	Amman (JOR)	09 July 2018
18	9.98	+1.9	Andre Ewers	Jamaica	Tampa, FL (USA)	25 May 2018
19	9.99	+1.1	Kendal Williams	United States	Knoxville, TN (USA)	13 May 2018
19	9.99	+0.2	Filippo Tortu	Italy	Moratalaz, Madrid (ESP)	22 June 2018
19	9.99	+0.4	Jak Ali Harvey	Turkey	Bellinzona (SUI)	18 July 2018
22	10.00	+0.5	Cejhae Greene	Netherlands Antilles	Barranquilla (COL)	29 July 2018
22	10.00	+0.8	Tosin Ogunode	Qatar	Jakarta (INA)	26 August 2018
22	10.00	+0.8	Ryota Yamagata	Japan	Jakarta (INA)	26 August 2018
25	10.01	+1.4	Gavin Smellie	Canada	Windsor (CAN)	19 May 2018
25	10.01	+1.7	Bryce Robinson	United States	Fort Worth, TX (USA)	31 May 2018
25	10.01	-0.7	Alonso Edward	Panama	Cochabamba (BOL)	06 June 2018
25	10.01	+0.2	Emile Erasmus	South Africa	La Chaux-de-Fonds (SUI)	01 July 2018
29	10.02	+1.9	Jeff Demps	United States	Drake Stadium, Des Moines, IA (USA)	21 June 2018
29	10.02	-0.6	Paulo André Camilo De Oliveira	Brazil	Bragança Paulista (BRA)	14 September 2018
31	10.03	-0.7	Justin Gatlin	United States	Mestský Stadion, Ostrava (CZE)	13 June 2018
31	10.03	+1.2	Abdullah Abkar Mohammed	Saudi Arabia	Stade Charléty, Paris (FRA)	30 June 2018
31	10.03	+1.2	Hassan Taftian	Iran	Stade Charléty, Paris (FRA)	30 June 2018
31	10.03	+0.5	Mario Burke	Barbados	Barranquilla (COL)	29 July 2018
35	10.04	+1.7	Ojie Edoburun	United Kingdom	Stadion Juliska, Praha (CZE)	04 June 2018
36	10.05	+0.5	Jason Rogers	Saint Kitts and Nevis	Barranquilla (COL)	29 July 2018
37	10.06	+1.7	Roscoe Engel	South Africa	Pretoria (RSA)	15 March 2018
37	10.06	+1.1	Sydney Siame	Zambia	x-bionic sphere, Šamorín (SVK)	29 June 2018
37	10.06	0.0	Chijindu Ujah	United Kingdom	Olympiastadion, Berlin (GER)	07 August 2018
40	10.07	-1.3	Simon Magakwe	South Africa	Pretoria (RSA)	16 March 2018
40	10.07	+1.9	Mckinley West	United States	Tampa, FL (USA)	25 May 2018
40	10.07	+1.1	Amaury Golitin	France	Jesolo (ITA)	09 June 2018
40	10.07	+1.2	Ameer Webb	United States	Ninove (BEL)	28 July 2018
40	10.07	+1.7	Nesta Carter	Jamaica	Barranquilla (COL)	30 July 2018
45	10.08	+2.0	Nethaneel Mitchell-Blake	United Kingdom	Baton Rouge, LA (USA)	21 April 2018
45	10.08	+0.7	Lamont Marcell Jacobs	Italy	Savona (ITA)	23 May 2018
45	10.08	+1.7	Emre Zafer Barnes	Turkey	Stadion Juliska, Praha (CZE)	04 June 2018
45	10.08	+0.5	Javoy Tucker	Jamaica	Barranquilla (COL)	29 July 2018
45	10.08	+0.3	Jorge Vides	Brazil	Sao Bernardo do Campo (BRA)	18 August 2018
50	10.09	+1.9	Darryl Haraway	United States	Tampa, FL (USA)	25 May 2018
50	10.09	+0.9	Anthony Schwartz	United States	Albuquerque, NM (USA)	02 June 2018
50	10.09	-0.7	Alex Quiñónez	Ecuador	Cochabamba (BOL)	06 June 2018
50	10.09	+1.4	Aleixo Platini Menga	Germany	Weinheim (GER)	06 July 2018
54	10.10	+0.4	Trae Williams	Australia	Gold Coast (AUS)	16 February 2018
54	10.10	+1.9	Clarence Munyai	South Africa	Pretoria (RSA)	24 February 2018
54	10.10	-0.2	Henricho Bruintjies	South Africa	Pretoria (RSA)	15 March 2018
54	10.10	+0.3	Kemar Hyman	Cayman Islands	Gold Coast (AUS)	08 April 2018
54	10.10	+1.4	Divine Oduduru	Nigeria	Waco, TX (USA)	21 April 2018
54	10.10	+1.1	Raheem Chambers	Jamaica	Knoxville, TN (USA)	13 May 2018
54	10.10	+1.2	Waseem Williams	Jamaica	Bloomington, IN (USA)	13 May 2018
54	10.10	+1.1	Ramil Guliyev	Turkey	Mersin (TUR)	19 May 2018
54	10.10	-0.9	Elijah Hall-Thompson	United States	Eugene, OR (USA)	06 June 2018
54	10.10	+0.1	Jevaughn Minzie	Jamaica	Kingston (JAM)	09 June 2018
54	10.10	+0.2	Derick Silva	Brazil	Guadalajara (ESP)	06 July 2018
54	10.10	+0.4	Yoshihide Kiryu	Japan	Bellinzona (SUI)	18 July 2018

== Women top 60 ==
#	Time	Wind	Athlete	Country	Venue	Date
1	10.85	+1.5	Marie-Josée Ta Lou	Ivory Coast	Suhaim bin Hamad Stadium, Doha (QAT)	04 May 2018
1	10.85	0.0	Dina Asher-Smith	United Kingdom	Olympiastadion, Berlin (GER)	07 August 2018
3	10.90	+1.5	Blessing Okagbare-Ighoteguonor	Nigeria	Suhaim bin Hamad Stadium, Doha (QAT)	04 May 2018
3	10.90	+1.9	Aleia Hobbs	United States	Tampa, FL (USA)	25 May 2018
3	10.90	+1.9	Murielle Ahouré	Ivory Coast	Hayward Field, Eugene, OR (USA)	26 May 2018
6	10.93	+1.5	Elaine Thompson	Jamaica	Suhaim bin Hamad Stadium, Doha (QAT)	04 May 2018
7	10.95	+1.1	Mujinga Kambundji	Switzerland	Zofingen (SUI)	13 July 2018
8	10.96	+0.6	Ashley Henderson	United States	Drake Stadium, Des Moines, IA (USA)	22 June 2018
8	10.96	+0.9	Jenna Prandini	United States	Toronto (CAN)	11 August 2018
10	10.98	+1.5	Carina Horn	South Africa	Suhaim bin Hamad Stadium, Doha (QAT)	04 May 2018
10	10.98	+1.5	Shania Collins	United States	Eugene, OR (USA)	07 June 2018
10	10.98	+0.1	Shelly-Ann Fraser-Pryce	Jamaica	Olympic Stadium, London (GBR)	21 July 2018
10	10.98	0.0	Gina Lückenkemper	Germany	Olympiastadion, Berlin (GER)	07 August 2018
14	10.99	+1.7	Twanisha Terry	United States	Torrance, CA (USA)	21 April 2018
14	10.99	+1.8	Dezerea Bryant	United States	Drake Stadium, Des Moines, IA (USA)	21 June 2018
14	10.99	+1.2	Yongli Wei	China	La Chaux-de-Fonds (SUI)	01 July 2018
14	10.99	0.0	Dafne Schippers	Netherlands	Olympiastadion, Berlin (GER)	07 August 2018
18	11.01	-1.5	Ángela Gabriela Tenorio	Ecuador	Cochabamba (BOL)	06 June 2018
18	11.01	+1.5	Carolle Zahi	France	Albi (FRA)	07 July 2018
20	11.02	+1.5	Tamara Clark	United States	Knoxville, TN (USA)	12 May 2018
20	11.02	+0.9	English Gardner	United States	Rovereto (ITA)	23 August 2018
22	11.03	+1.9	Tori Bowie	United States	Hayward Field, Eugene, OR (USA)	26 May 2018
22	11.03	+0.3	Vitoria Cristina Rosa	Brazil	Guadalajara (ESP)	06 July 2018
24	11.04	+1.5	Natalliah Whyte	Jamaica	Knoxville, TN (USA)	12 May 2018
24	11.04	+1.1	Jada Baylark	United States	Sacramento, CA (USA)	25 May 2018
24	11.04	+0.7	Krystsina Tsimanouskaya	Belarus	Minsk (BLR)	11 July 2018
27	11.05	+0.4	Mikiah Brisco	United States	Tampa, FL (USA)	25 May 2018
28	11.06	+1.6	Michelle-Lee Ahye	Trinidad and Tobago	Bislett Stadion, Oslo (NOR)	07 June 2018
28	11.06	+1.5	Orlann Ombissa-Dzangue	France	Albi (FRA)	07 July 2018
30	11.07	+1.6	Semoy Hackett	Trinidad and Tobago	Montverde, FL (USA)	09 June 2018
30	11.07	+0.1	Jonielle Smith	Jamaica	Olympic Stadium, London (GBR)	21 July 2018
32	11.08	+1.5	Arianna Washington	United States	Eugene, OR (USA)	07 June 2018
33	11.10	+1.7	Kortnei Johnson	United States	Tampa, FL (USA)	24 May 2018
33	11.10	+1.9	Javianne Oliver	United States	Hayward Field, Eugene, OR (USA)	26 May 2018
33	11.10	+0.3	Jamile Samuel	Netherlands	Olympiastadion, Berlin (GER)	07 August 2018
36	11.11	+0.9	Teahna Daniels	United States	Waco, TX (USA)	13 May 2018
36	11.11	-0.1	Tatjana Pinto	Germany	Regensburg (GER)	03 June 2018
36	11.11	+0.1	Imani Lansiquot	United Kingdom	Olympic Stadium, London (GBR)	21 July 2018
36	11.11	+0.9	Crystal Emmanuel	Canada	Toronto (CAN)	11 August 2018
40	11.12	-0.7	Marizol Narcisa Landázuri	Ecuador	Cochabamba (BOL)	06 June 2018
41	11.13	+1.7	Briana Williams	Jamaica	Jacksonville, FL (USA)	17 March 2018
41	11.13	+1.5	Kiara Parker	United States	Knoxville, TN (USA)	12 May 2018
41	11.13	+1.4	Taylor Bennett	United States	Waco, TX (USA)	12 May 2018
41	11.13	+1.7	Ka'Tia Seymour	United States	Tampa, FL (USA)	24 May 2018
41	11.13	+1.6	Tamari Davis	United States	Montverde, FL (USA)	09 June 2018
41	11.13	+0.6	Aaliyah Brown	United States	Drake Stadium, Des Moines, IA (USA)	22 June 2018
41	11.13	+0.4	Shericka Jackson	Jamaica	Kingston (JAM)	22 June 2018
48	11.15	+0.8	Lekeisha Lawson	United States	Chula Vista, CA (USA)	09 June 2018
48	11.15	+1.5	Orphée Neola	France	Albi (FRA)	06 July 2018
50	11.16	+0.9	Kevona Davis	Jamaica	Kingston (JAM)	23 March 2018
50	11.16	+0.4	Celera Barnes	United States	Tampa, FL (USA)	25 May 2018
50	11.16	-0.1	Kristal Awuah	United Kingdom	Olympiastadion, Berlin (GER)	02 September 2018
53	11.17	+0.9	Leya Buchanan	Canada	Waco, TX (USA)	13 May 2018
53	11.17	+1.6	Hajar Al Khaldi	Brunei	Amman (JOR)	09 July 2018
55	11.18	+1.2	Khianna Gray	United States	Tampa, FL (USA)	24 May 2018
55	11.18	+1.1	Ivet Lalova-Collio	Bulgaria	Montreuil (FRA)	19 June 2018
55	11.18	+1.8	Deajah Stevens	United States	Drake Stadium, Des Moines, IA (USA)	21 June 2018
55	11.18	0.0	Barbara Pierre	United States	CNDA, Bragança Paulista (BRA)	08 July 2018
59	11.19	-0.4	Quanesha Burks	United States	Baton Rouge, LA (USA)	28 April 2018
59	11.19	+1.9	Gabrielle Thomas	United States	Tampa, FL (USA)	24 May 2018
59	11.19	-1.2	Isidora Jiménez	Chile	Cochabamba (BOL)	06 June 2018
59	11.19	-0.5	Daryll Neita	United Kingdom	Birmingham (GBR)	30 June 2018
59	11.19	+0.4	Jeneba Tarmoh	United States	Bellinzona (SUI)	18 July 2018

== See also ==
- 2019 in 100 metres
