= Sierra Leone at the 2014 Commonwealth Games =

- CGF code: SLE
- CGA: National Olympic Committee of Sierra Leone
- Website: nocsl.org

in Glasgow, Scotland
- Competitors: 23 in 8 sports
- Flag bearer: James Fayla
- Medals: Gold 0 Silver 0 Bronze 0 Total 0

Commonwealth Games appearances (overview)
- 1958; 1962; 1966; 1970; 1974; 1978; 1982–1986; 1990; 1994; 1998; 2002; 2006; 2010; 2014; 2018; 2022; 2026; 2030

Sierra Leone competed in the 2014 Commonwealth Games in Glasgow, Scotland, from 23 July to 3 August 2014.

== Athletics ==
Key

- Note–Ranks given for track events are within the athlete's heat only
- Q = Qualified for the next round
- q = Qualified for the next round as a fastest loser or, in field events, by position without achieving the qualifying target
- NR = National record
- N/A = Round not applicable for the event

Men
Track & road events

Athlete	Event	Heat		Semifinal		Final	
Athlete	Event	Result	Rank	Result	Rank	Result	Rank
Gibrilla Bangura	100 m	10.79	42	did not advance			
Adel Sesay	100 m	11.02	57	did not advance			
Solomon Bockarie	100 m	10.83	46	did not advance			
Solomon Bockarie	200 m	21.45	44	did not advance			
Gibrilla Bangura; Solomon Bockarie; Adel Sesay; Jimmy Thoronka; Thomas Wandy	4x100 m relay	40.55	13	—		did not advance	
Gibrilla Bangura; Solomon Bockarie; Adel Sesay; Jimmy Thoronka; Thomas Wandy	4x400 m relay	DNS		—		did not advance	

Women
Track & road events

Athlete	Event	Heat		Semifinal		Final	
Athlete	Event	Result	Rank	Result	Rank	Result	Rank
Hafsatu Kamara	100 m	12.14	32	did not advance			
Hafsatu Kamara	200 m	25.12	30	did not advance			
Michaela Kargbo	100 m	12.33	36	did not advance			
Michaela Kargbo	200 m	25.89	37	did not advance			
Catherine Eke	200 m	24.76	27	did not advance			
Catherine Eke	400 m	54.80	25	did not advance			
Rebecca Ansumana	400 m	DSQ		did not advance			
Mariatu Suma	400 m	57.15	36	did not advance			
Rebecca Ansumana; Catherine Eke; Hafsatu Kamara; Michaela Kargbo; Mariatu Suma	4x100 m relay	DNS		—		did not advance	
Rebecca Ansumana; Catherine Eke; Hafsatu Kamara; Michaela Kargbo; Mariatu Suma	4x400 m relay	DNS		—		did not advance	

== Boxing ==
Men

Athlete	Event	Round of 32	Round of 16	Quarterfinals	Semifinals	Final	
Athlete	Event	Opposition Result	Opposition Result	Opposition Result	Opposition Result	Opposition Result	Rank
Mohamed Sillah	Welterweight	D Lewis (AUS); L KO1	did not advance				
Abdul Bangura	Middleweight	B Blair (CAN); L 1 - 2	did not advance				

== Cycling ==
=== Road ===
Men

Athlete	Event	Time	Rank
Moses Sesay	Road race	DNF	
Moses Sesay	Time trial	1:11:00.11	56

== Judo ==
Men

Athlete	Event	Round of 32	Round of 16	Quarterfinal	Semifinal	Repechage	Final / BM	Rank
Athlete	Event	Opposition Result	Opposition Result	Opposition Result	Opposition Result	Opposition Result	Opposition Result	Rank
Leslie Smith	−66 kg	J Macdonald (WAL); L w/o	did not advance					

== Squash ==
Individual

Athlete	Event	Round of 128	Round of 64	Round of 32	Round of 16	Quarterfinals	Semifinals	Final	Rank
Athlete	Event	Opposition Score	Opposition Score	Opposition Score	Opposition Score	Opposition Score	Opposition Score	Opposition Score	Rank
James Fayia	Men's Singles	Bye	J Chapman (IVB); L 0-3	did not advance					
Issa Kamara	Men's Singles	Bye	P Coll (NZL); L 0-3	did not advance					

Doubles

Athlete	Event	Group Stage			Round of 16	Quarterfinal	Semifinal	Final	Rank
Athlete	Event	Opposition Score	Opposition Score	Rank	Opposition Score	Opposition Score	Opposition Score	Opposition Score	Rank
James Fayia; Issa Kamara	Men's doubles	New Zealand; L w/o	Bermuda; L w/o	3	did not advance				

== Table Tennis ==
Singles

Athlete	Event	Group Stage			Round of 64	Round of 32	Round of 16	Quarterfinals	Semifinals	Final	Rank
Athlete	Event	Opposition Result	Opposition Result	Rank	Opposition Result	Opposition Result	Opposition Result	Opposition Result	Opposition Result	Opposition Result	Rank
Samuel Morris	Men's Singles	Graham (NIR); L 0 - 4	Pierre (LCA); W 4 - 3	2	did not advance						
Stella Grant	Women's Singles	Yang (NZL); L 0 - 4	Ludlow (NIR); L 0 - 4	3	did not advance						

Doubles

Athlete	Event	Round of 128	Round of 64	Round of 32	Round of 16	Quarterfinals	Semifinals	Final	Rank
Athlete	Event	Opposition Result	Opposition Result	Opposition Result	Opposition Result	Opposition Result	Opposition Result	Opposition Result	Rank
Stella Grant; Samuel Morris	Mixed Doubles	Jamaica; L 1 - 3	did not advance						

== Weightlifting ==
Men

Athlete	Event	Snatch		Clean & Jerk		Total	Rank
Athlete	Event	Result	Rank	Result	Rank	Total	Rank
Jonathan Johnson	−77 kg	90	25	110	24	200	24

== Wrestling ==
Key:

- VT - Victory by Fall.
- PP - Decision by Points - the loser with technical points.
- PO - Decision by Points - the loser without technical points.

Men's freestyle

Athlete	Event	Round of 32	Round of 16	Quarterfinal	Semifinal	Repechage	Final / BM	Rank
Athlete	Event	Opposition Result	Opposition Result	Opposition Result	Opposition Result	Opposition Result	Opposition Result	Rank
Abdulai Rogers	−65 kg	—	C Perera (SRI); L 0-5	did not advance				
Alpha Bangura	−74 kg	Bye	M Bibo (NGR); L 0-5	did not advance				
