= Athletics at the 2014 Commonwealth Games – Women's 200 metres =

Women's 200 metres at the Commonwealth Games

The Women's 200 metres at the 2014 Commonwealth Games, as part of the athletics programme, was held at Hampden Park on 30 and 31 July 2014.

== Results ==
=== Heats ===
==== Heat 1 ====
Rank	Lane	Name	Reaction	Result	Notes	Qual.
1	1	Blessing Okagbare (NGR)	0.177	22.99		Q
2	4	Kineke Alexander (SVG)	0.183	23.44		Q
3	3	Shai-Anne Davis (CAN)	0.158	23.51		Q
4	5	Kaina Martinez (BIZ)	0.257	24.54		
5	2	Gemma Acheampong (GHA)	0.155	24.90		
6	7	Joanne Loutoy (SEY)	0.191	25.85		
7	6	Michaela Kargbo (SLE)	0.170	25.89		
				Wind: -0.6		

==== Heat 2 ====
Rank	Lane	Name	Reaction	Result	Notes	Qual.
1	7	Bianca Williams (ENG)	0.180	22.97		Q
2	2	Samantha Henry-Robinson (JAM)	0.153	23.18		Q
3	6	Reyare Thomas (TTO)	0.180	23.25	SB	Q
4	3	Toea Wisil (PNG)	0.168	24.26		q
5	4	Veronica Pereira (SIN)	0.164	24.31	SB	
6	5	Catherine Eke (SLE)	0.249	24.76		
7	8	Patricia Taea (COK)	0.181	26.14		
				Wind: -0.5		

==== Heat 3 ====
Rank	Lane	Name	Reaction	Result	Notes	Qual.
1	6	Anneisha McLaughlin (JAM)	0.176	23.27		Q
2	4	Crystal Emmanuel (CAN)	0.173	23.54		Q
3	8	Ella Nelson (AUS)	0.185	23.57		Q
4	5	Karene King (IVB)	0.209	24.22		q
5	3	Doreen Agyei (GHA)	0.173	25.27		
6	7	Shirley Vunatup (PNG)	0.220	25.79	PB	
7	2	Shirin Akter (BAN)	0.191	26.41		
				Wind: +0.2		

==== Heat 4 ====
Rank	Lane	Name	Reaction	Result	Notes	Qual.
1	3	Schillonie Calvert (JAM)	0.169	23.14		Q
2	5	Anyika Onuora (ENG)	0.179	23.19		Q
3	7	Nivea Smith (BAH)	0.205	23.48		Q
4	8	Anna Ramona Papaioannou (CYP)	0.117	23.61		q
5	6	Joanilla Janvier (MRI)	0.153	25.30		
6	4	Younis Bese (FIJ)	0.218	25.84		
				Wind: +0.8		

==== Heat 5 ====
Rank	Lane	Name	Reaction	Result	Notes	Qual.
1	2	Jodie Williams (ENG)	0.186	23.42		Q
2	4	Janet Amponsah (GHA)	0.175	24.05		Q
3	6	Ashley Kelly (IVB)	0.213	24.40		Q
4	3	Ashleigh Whittaker (AUS)	0.191	24.47		q
5	5	Diane Borg (MLT)	0.153	24.74	SB	
6	7	Hafsatu Kamara (SLE)	0.173	25.12		
7	8	Adrine Monagi (PNG)	0.185	26.71		
				Wind: -1.6		

==== Heat 6 ====
Rank	Lane	Name	Reaction	Result	Notes	Qual.
1	3	Kimberly Hyacinthe (CAN)	0.163	23.29		Q
2	4	Jade Bailey (BAR)	0.181	23.75		Q
3	2	Dominique Duncan (NGR)	0.197	23.89		Q
4	6	Phumlile Ndzinisa (SWZ)	0.192	24.16		q
5	7	Milcent Ndoro (KEN)	0.177	24.84		
6	8	Irene Bell Bonong (CMR)	0.203	25.61		
7	5	Tyra Summer Ree (SIN)	0.197	26.74		
				Wind: +0.9		

=== Semi-finals ===
==== Semi-final 1 ====
Rank	Lane	Name	Reaction	Result	Notes	Qual.
1	3	Blessing Okagbare (NGR)	0.153	22.43		Q
2	5	Jodie Williams (ENG)	0.199	22.64		Q
3	4	Anneisha McLaughlin (JAM)	0.147	22.79		q
4	6	Kimberly Hyacinthe (CAN)	0.173	23.14		q
5	8	Nivea Smith (BAH)	0.218	23.22	SB	
6	7	Ella Nelson (AUS)	0.171	23.50		
7	2	Veronica Shanti Pereira (SIN)	0.177	24.29	SB	
8	1	Phumlile Ndzinisa (SWZ)	0.164	24.32		
				Wind: +0.9		

==== Semi-final 2 ====
Rank	Lane	Name	Reaction	Result	Notes	Qual.
1	5	Schillonie Calvert (JAM)	0.165	22.97		Q
2	6	Anyika Onuora (ENG)	0.193	23.02		Q
3	8	Reyare Thomas (TTO)	0.165	23.35		
4	3	Crystal Emmanuel (CAN)	0.168	23.46		
5	4	Kineke Alexander (SVG)	0.175	23.58		
6	7	Dominique Duncan (NGR)	0.209	23.88		
7	1	Toea Wisil (PNG)	0.174	24.48		
8	2	Karene King (IVB)	0.183	24.67		
				Wind: -0.2		

==== Semi-final 3 ====
Rank	Lane	Name	Reaction	Result	Notes	Qual.
1	4	Bianca Williams (ENG)	0.147	23.17		Q
2	5	Samantha Henry-Robinson (JAM)	0.182	23.43		Q
3	7	Shai-Anne Davis (CAN)	0.161	23.48		
4	2	Anna Ramona Papaioannou (CYP)	0.159	23.87		
5	8	Ashley Kelly (IVB)	0.164	24.00		
6	3	Jade Bailey (BAR)	0.205	24.04		
7	1	Ashleigh Whittaker (AUS)	0.194	24.49		
8	6	Janet Amponsah (GHA)	0.182		DQ	
				Wind: +0.4		

=== Final ===
Wind: +0.4 m/s

Rank	Lanes	Athlete	Nation	Time	Notes
1st place, gold medalist(s)	6	Blessing Okagbare	NGR	22.25	
2nd place, silver medalist(s)	5	Jodie Williams	ENG	22.50	PB
3rd place, bronze medalist(s)	3	Bianca Williams	ENG	22.58	PB
4	8	Anyika Onuora	ENG	22.64	PB
5	2	Anneisha McLaughlin	JAM	22.68	SB
6	4	Schillonie Calvert	JAM	22.94	
7	1	Kimberly Hyacinthe	CAN	23.11	
8	7	Samantha Henry-Robinson	JAM	23.24	
