= 2018 European Athletics Championships – Women's 100 metres =

Women's 100 metres at the 2018 European Athletics Championships
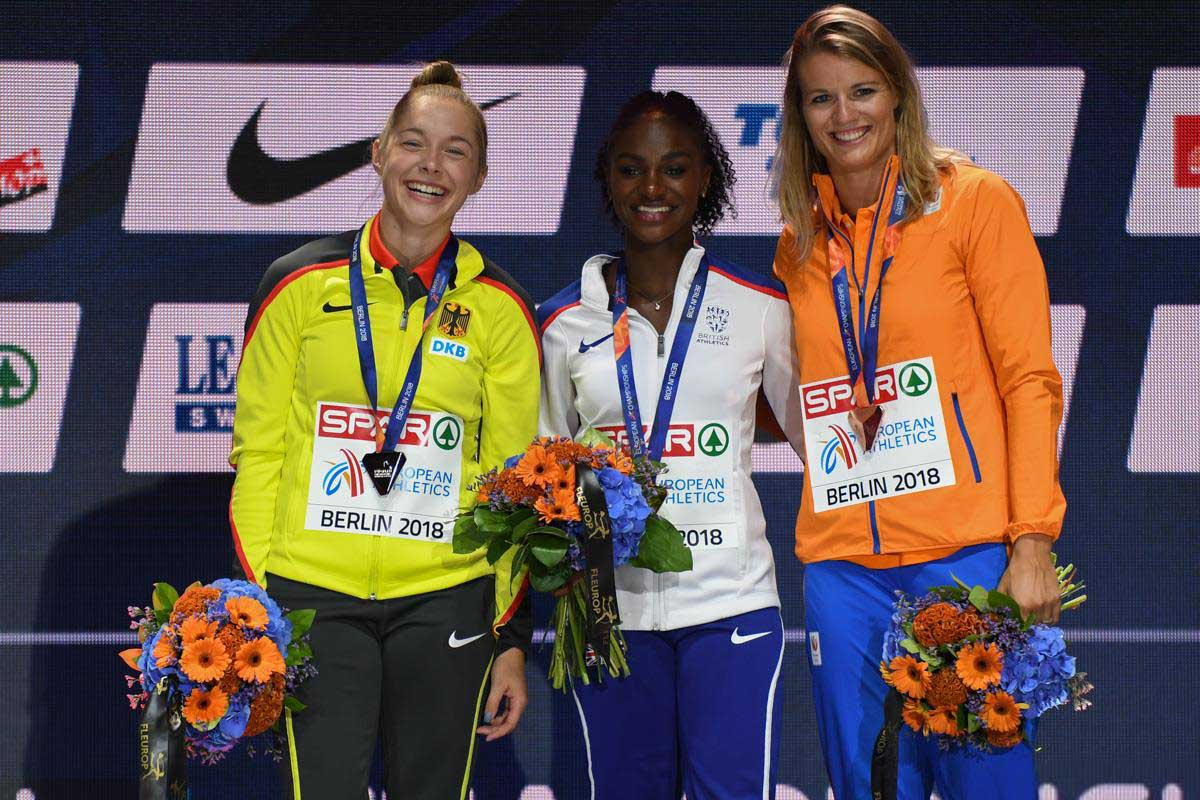
- Venue: Olympiastadion
- Location: Berlin
- Dates: 6 August (round 1); 7 August (semifinals & final)
- Competitors: 37 from 22 nations
- Winning time: 10.85s

Medalists
gold medal	Dina Asher-Smith	Great Britain
silver medal	Gina Lückenkemper	Germany
bronze medal	Dafne Schippers	Netherlands

The women's 100 metres at the 2018 European Athletics Championships took place at the Olympiastadion on 6 and 7 August.

== Records ==
Standing records prior to the 2018 European Athletics Championships
World record	Florence Griffith Joyner (USA)	10.49	Indianapolis, United States	16 July 1988
European record	Christine Arron (FRA)	10.73	Budapest, Hungary	19 August 1998
Championship record	Christine Arron (FRA)	10.73	Budapest, Hungary	19 August 1998
World leading	Marie-Josée Ta Lou (CIV)	10.85	Doha, Qatar	4 May 2018
European leading	Dina Asher-Smith (GBR)	10.92	Oslo, Norway	7 June 2018
Broken records during the 2018 European Athletics Championships
European Leading	Dina Asher-Smith (GBR)	10.85	Berlin, Germany	7 August 2018

== Schedule ==
Date	Time	Round
6 August 2018	17:45	Round 1
7 August 2018	19:05	Semifinals
7 August 2018	21:30	Final

All times are local times (UTC+2)

== Results ==
=== Round 1 ===
First 3 in each heat (Q) and the next 4 fastest (q) advanced to the semifinals. The top 11 ranked athletes received a bye to the semifinals.

Wind: Heat 1: -0.7 m/s, Heat 2: -0.9 m/s, Heat 3: -0.2 m/s

Rank	Heat	Lane	Name	Nationality	Time	Note
1	2	9	Lisa Marie Kwayie	Germany	11.30	Q
2	2	2	Ewa Swoboda	Poland	11.33	Q
3	3	4	Ajla Del Ponte	Switzerland	11.39	Q
4	1	1	Ezinne Okparaebo	Norway	11.44	Q
5	3	6	Phil Healy	Ireland	11.44	Q
6	2	4	Naomi Sedney	Netherlands	11.45	Q
7	3	5	Inna Eftimova	Bulgaria	11.45	Q
8	2	5	Daryll Neita	Great Britain	11.48	q
9	1	2	Salomé Kora	Switzerland	11.48	Q
10	1	5	Marije van Hunenstijn	Netherlands	11.48	Q
11	2	7	Lorène Bazolo	Portugal	11.51	q
12	1	8	Anna Bongiorni	Italy	11.53	q
13	3	1	Irene Siragusa	Italy	11.61	q
14	3	3	Diana Vaisman	Israel	11.61	
15	3	2	Klára Seidlová	Czech Republic	11.63	
16	3	8	Rafailía Spanoudaki-Hatziriga	Greece	11.63	
17	1	4	Gina Akpe-Moses	Ireland	11.63	
18	2	3	Cristina Lara	Spain	11.65	
19	2	8	Alexandra Toth	Austria	11.69	
20	3	7	Helene Rønningen	Norway	11.70	
21	1	9	María Isabel Pérez	Spain	11.70	
22	2	6	Anasztázia Nguyen	Hungary	11.72	
23	2	1	Karolina Deliautaitė	Lithuania	11.75	
24	1	3	Marie Charlotte Gastaud	Monaco	13.59	
25	1	7	Hrystyna Stuy	Ukraine	42.66	
–	1	6	Olivia Fotopoulou	Cyprus	DQ	R 162.8

=== Semifinals ===
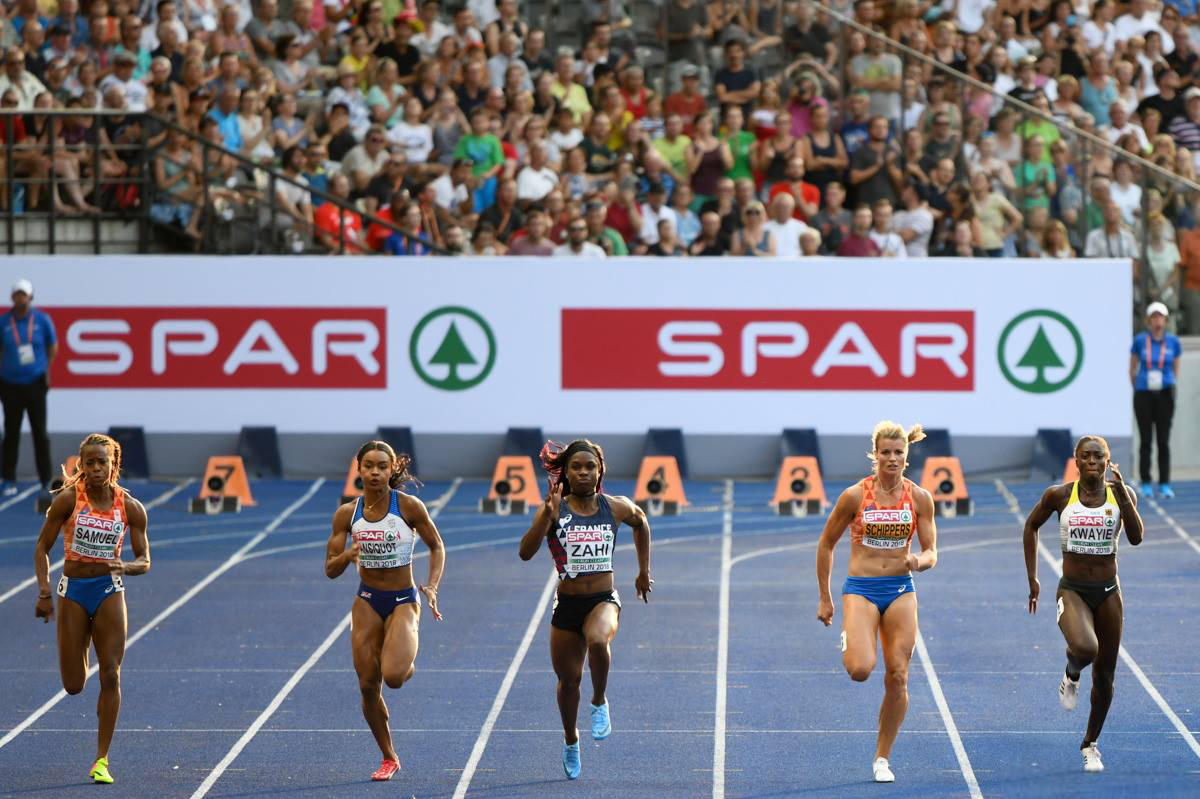
Semifinal 3

First 2 in each heat (Q) and the next 2 fastest (q) advanced to the final.

Wind: Heat 1: +0.2 m/s, Heat 2: +0.1 m/s, Heat 3: +0.3 m/s

Rank	Heat	Lane	Name	Nationality	Time	Note
1	1	3	Dina Asher-Smith*	Great Britain	10.93	Q
2	1	5	Gina Lückenkemper*	Germany	10.98	Q, AU23R
3	3	3	Dafne Schippers*	Netherlands	11.05	Q
4	3	6	Jamile Samuel*	Netherlands	11.10	Q, PB
5	2	3	Mujinga Kambundji*	Switzerland	11.14	Q
5	3	5	Imani-Lara Lansiquot*	Great Britain	11.14	q
7	3	4	Carolle Zahi*	France	11.16	q
8	2	5	Orlann Ombissa-Dzangue*	France	11.20	Q
9	2	4	Tatjana Pinto*	Germany	11.26	
10	2	6	Daryll Neita	Great Britain	11.27	
11	2	8	Ewa Swoboda	Poland	11.30	
12	1	4	Orphée Neola*	France	11.33	
13	1	6	Krystsina Tsimanouskaya*	Belarus	11.34	
14	3	2	Lisa Marie Kwayie	Germany	11.36	
15	3	7	Salomé Kora	Switzerland	11.36	
16	3	8	Ezinne Okparaebo	Norway	11.37	
17	1	8	Ajla Del Ponte	Switzerland	11.38	
18	1	7	Naomi Sedney	Netherlands	11.42	
19	3	1	Lorène Bazolo	Portugal	11.46	
20	1	1	Phil Healy	Ireland	11.46	
21	2	2	Marije van Hunenstijn	Netherlands	11.49	
22	2	1	Inna Eftimova	Bulgaria	11.52	
23	2	7	Irene Siragusa	Italy	11.60	
24	1	2	Anna Bongiorni	Italy	11.62	

* Athletes who received a bye to the semifinals

=== Final ===
The medals were determined in the final.

Wind: 0.0 m/s

Rank	Lane	Name	Nationality	Time	Note
1st place, gold medalist(s)	5	Dina Asher-Smith	Great Britain	10.85	=WL, EL, NR
2nd place, silver medalist(s)	6	Gina Lückenkemper	Germany	10.98	
3rd place, bronze medalist(s)	3	Dafne Schippers	Netherlands	10.99	SB
4	4	Mujinga Kambundji	Switzerland	11.05	
5	7	Jamile Samuel	Netherlands	11.14	
6	2	Imani-Lara Lansiquot	Great Britain	11.14	
7	1	Carolle Zahi	France	11.20	
8	8	Orlann Ombissa-Dzangue	France	11.29	
