= 2010 World Junior Championships in Athletics – Women's 200 metres =

The women's 200 metres at the 2010 World Junior Championships in Athletics was held at the Moncton 2010 Stadium on 22 & 23 July.

== Medalists ==
Gold	Silver	Bronze
Stormy Kendrick; United States	Jodie Williams; Great Britain	Jamile Samuel; Netherlands

== Records ==
Prior to the competition, the existing world junior and championship records were as follows.

	Name	Nationality	Time	Location	Date
World junior record	Allyson Felix	United States	22.18	Athens	August 25, 2004
Championship record	Shalonda Solomon	Jamaica	22.82	Grosseto	July 16, 2004

No new records were established during the competition.

== Results ==
=== Final ===
23 July
Wind: -0.5 m/s

Rank	Name	Nationality	Time	Notes
1st place, gold medalist(s)	Stormy Kendrick	United States	22.99	PB
2nd place, silver medalist(s)	Jodie Williams	Great Britain	23.19	
3rd place, bronze medalist(s)	Jamile Samuel	Netherlands	23.27	
4	Kai Selvon	Trinidad and Tobago	23.58	
5	Ashton Purvis	United States	23.62	
6	Emily Diamond	Great Britain	23.65	
7	Allison Peter	United States Virgin Islands	23.70	
8	Kana Ichikawa	Japan	24.09	

Key: PB = Personal best

=== Semifinals ===
22 July

==== Semifinal 1 ====
Wind: +1.3 m/s

Rank	Name	Nationality	Time	Notes
1	Jodie Williams	United Kingdom	23.20	Q
2	Jamile Samuel	Netherlands	23.21	Q
3	Ashton Purvis	United States	23.48	q
4	Bárbara Leôncio	Brazil	23.86	
5	Adelina Pastor	Romania	24.04	
6	Ella Nelson	Australia	24.06	
7	Jennifer Galais	France	24.35	
8	Tynia Gaither	Bahamas	24.48	

==== Semifinal 2 ====
Wind: +1.8 m/s

Rank	Name	Nationality	Time	Notes
1	Allison Peter	U.S. Virgin Islands	23.68	Q
2	Kana Ichikawa	Japan	23.86	Q
3	Crystal Emmanuel	Canada	23.96	
4	Anthonique Strachan	Bahamas	23.99	
5	Fanny Chalas	Dominican Republic	24.02	
6	Justine Palframan	South Africa	24.09	
7	Karlie Morton	Australia	24.28	
8	Florence Nkiruka	Nigeria	24.31	

==== Semifinal 3 ====
Wind: +1.6 m/s

Rank	Name	Nationality	Time	Notes
1	Stormy Kendrick	United States	23.28	Q
2	Emily Diamond	United Kingdom	23.47	Q
3	Kai Selvon	Trinidad and Tobago	23.51	q
4	Mujinga Kambundji	Switzerland	23.68	
5	Cassandra Pascal	Canada	24.05	
6	Loreanne Kuhurima	Netherlands	24.27	
7	Nimet Karakuş	Turkey	24.36	
8	Orphée Neola	France	24.69	

=== Heats ===
22 July

==== Heat 1 ====
Wind: +2.0 m/s

Rank	Name	Nationality	Time	Notes
1	Allison Peter	U.S. Virgin Islands	23.62	Q
2	Bárbara Leôncio	Brazil	23.75	Q
3	Adelina Pastor	Romania	23.95	Q
4	Tynia Gaither	Bahamas	24.08	q
5	Nimet Karakuş	Turkey	24.23	q
6	Yanique Ellington	Jamaica	24.63	
7	Janet Amponsah	Ghana	24.86	

==== Heat 2 ====
Wind: +0.2 m/s

Rank	Name	Nationality	Time	Notes
1	Stormy Kendrick	United States	23.75	Q
2	Florence Nkiruka	Nigeria	23.79	Q
3	Fanny Chalas	Dominican Republic	24.12	Q
4	Loreanne Kuhurima	Netherlands	24.15	q
5	Ella Nelson	Australia	24.26	q
6	Narumi Tashiro	Japan	24.61	
7	Liona Rebernik	Slovenia	24.62	

==== Heat 3 ====
Wind: +0.5 m/s

Rank	Name	Nationality	Time	Notes
1	Anthonique Strachan	Bahamas	23.66	Q
2	Mujinga Kambundji	Switzerland	23.93	Q
3	Ashton Purvis	United States	24.26	Q
4	Diandre Gilbert	Jamaica	24.49	
5	Julia Riedl	Germany	24.64	
6	Chinta Gunti Santhi	India	25.01	
7	Nicole Pérez	Puerto Rico	25.63	

==== Heat 4 ====
Wind: +0.7 m/s

Rank	Name	Nationality	Time	Notes
1	Jodie Williams	United Kingdom	23.79	Q
2	Jennifer Galais	France	24.16	Q
3	Justine Palframan	South Africa	24.16	Q
4	Crystal Emmanuel	Canada	24.21	q
5	Martina Riedl	Germany	24.32	
6	Maitane Iruretagoyena	Spain	24.70	
7	Loretta Miani	Switzerland	25.23	

==== Heat 5 ====
Wind: +0.8 m/s

Rank	Name	Nationality	Time	Notes
1	Kai Selvon	Trinidad and Tobago	23.58	Q
2	Kana Ichikawa	Japan	23.92	Q
3	Orphée Neola	France	24.43	Q
4	Lenka Kršáková	Slovakia	24.80	
5	Chizoba Okodogbe	Nigeria	25.03	
6	Davanna Claxton	Saint Kitts and Nevis	25.59	

==== Heat 6 ====
Wind: +0.5 m/s

Rank	Name	Nationality	Time	Notes
1	Jamile Samuel	Netherlands	23.56	Q
2	Emily Diamond	United Kingdom	23.73	Q
3	Cassandra Pascal	Canada	24.00	Q
4	Karlie Morton	Australia	24.16	q
5	Gloria Hooper	Italy	24.74	
6	Liliana Núñez	Ecuador	24.96	

== Participation ==
According to an unofficial count, 40 athletes from 28 countries participated in the event.

- Australia (2)
- Bahamas (2)
- Brazil (1)
- Canada (2)
- Dominican Republic (1)
- Ecuador (1)
- France (2)
- Germany (2)
- Ghana (1)
- India (1)
- Italy (1)
- Jamaica (2)
- Japan (2)
- Netherlands (2)
- Nigeria (2)
- Puerto Rico (1)
- Romania (1)
- Saint Kitts and Nevis (1)
- Slovakia (1)
- Slovenia (1)
- South Africa (1)
- Spain (1)
- Switzerland (2)
- Trinidad and Tobago (1)
- Turkey (1)
- United Kingdom (2)
- United States (2)
- U.S. Virgin Islands (1)
