= Tatjana Pinto =

German sprinter

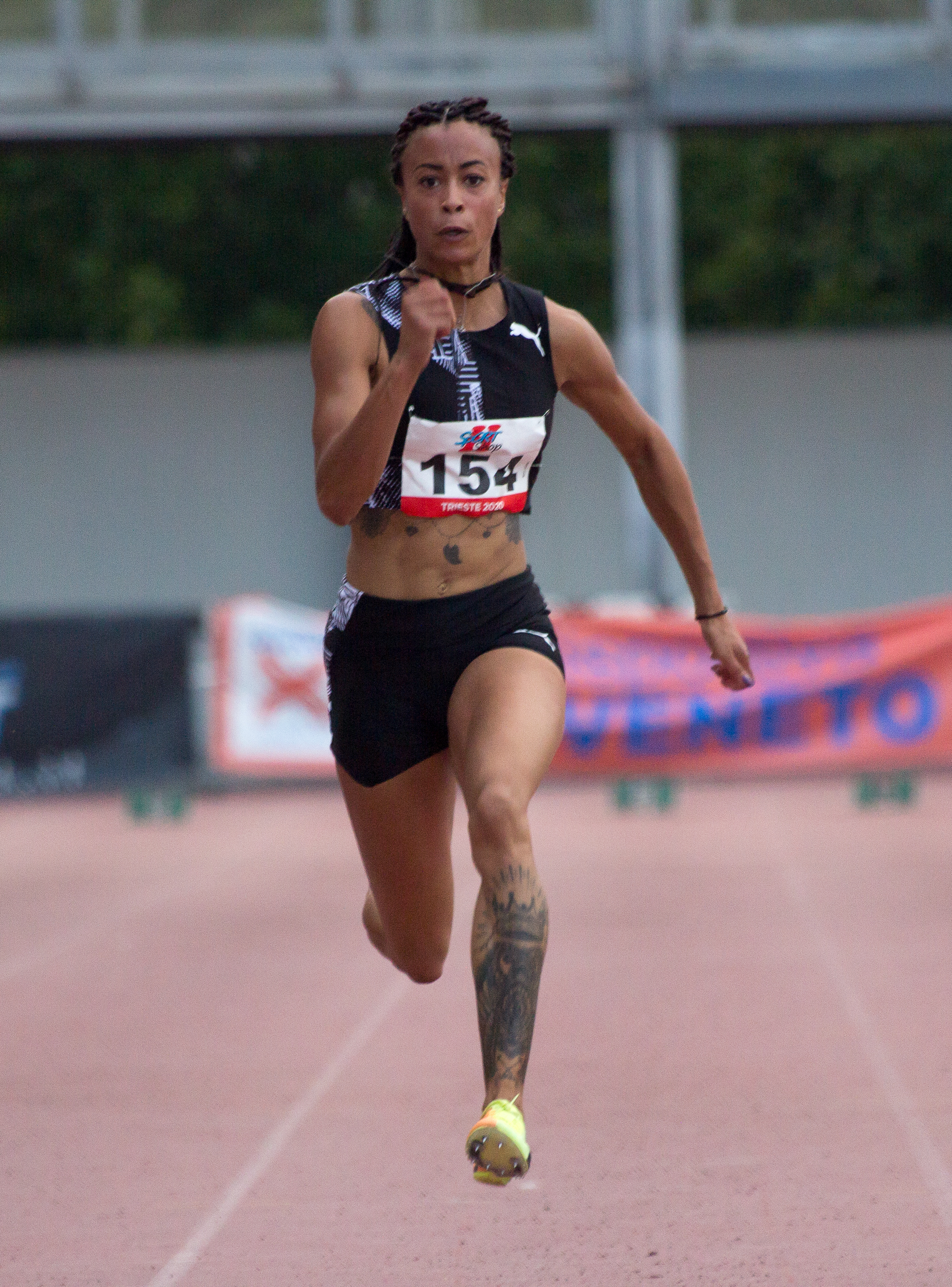
- Tatjana Pinto at the 2020 Triveneto Meeting in Trieste

Personal information
- Full name: Tatjana Lofamakanda Pinto
- Born: 2 July 1992 (age 34) Münster, Germany
- Height: 1.70 m (5 ft 7 in)
- Weight: 56 kg (123 lb)

Sport
- Country: Portugal
- Sport: Athletics
- Event: Sprint

Achievements and titles
- Regional finals: 1st at the 2012 European Athletics Championships
- Personal bests: 100 meters: 11.00 s (2016, Mannheim); 200 meters: 22.63 s (2019, Doha); 60 meters: 7.06 s (2018, Dortmund)
Medal record
Women's athletics
Representing Germany
World Championships
Bronze medal – third place	2022 Eugene	4 × 100 m relay
European Championships
Gold medal – first place	2012 Helsinki	4 × 100 m relay
Bronze medal – third place	2018 Berlin	4 × 100 m relay
Bronze medal – third place	2016 Amsterdam	4 × 100 m relay

Tatjana Lofamakanda Pinto (born 2 July 1992) is a Luso-German-Angolan athlete who competes as a sprinter for Portugal.

== Career ==
Together with Leena Günther, Anne Cibis and Verena Sailer, Pinto won the gold medal at the 2012 European Athletics Championships in Helsinki at the 4 × 100 metres relay. The same team came in fifth at the 2012 Summer Olympics in London.

In 2025, Pinto transferred her allegiance from her country of birth, Germany, to the country of her father's origin, Portugal.

== Personal life ==
Pinto's father is Portuguese, while her mother was from Angola.

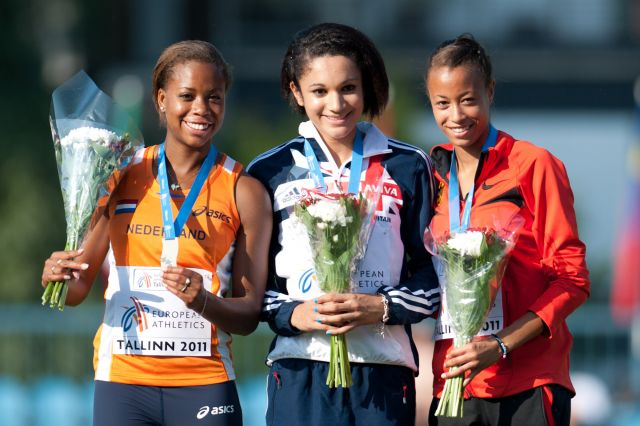
Left to right: Jamile Samuel, Jodie Williams and Pinto at the 2011 European Athletics Junior Championships in Tallinn

== Athletics achievements ==
Information from her World Athletics profile unless otherwise noted.

=== Personal bests ===
Type	Distance	Time (s)	Wind (m/s)	Venue	Date	Notes
Individual events
Indoor	60 metres	7.06	—N/a	Dortmund, Germany	17 February 2018	
Indoor	200 metres sh	23.19	—N/a	Dortmund, Germany	18 February 2018	
Outdoor	100 metres	11.00	+1.2	Mannheim, Germany	29 July 2016	
Outdoor	200 metres	22.63	+0.8	Doha, Qatar	30 September 2019	
Outdoor	300 metres	39.89	—N/a	Lisbon, Portugal	25 April 2025	
Team events
Indoor	4 × 200 metres relay sh	1:35.97	—N/a	Leipzig, Germany	28 February 2016	
Outdoor	4 × 100 metres relay	41.62	—N/a	Mannheim, Germany	29 July 2016	
Outdoor	Mixed 4 × 100 metres relay	40.76	—N/a	Gaborone, Botswana	3 May 2026	
Outdoor	4 × 200 metres relay	1:30.68	—N/a	Nassau, The Bahamas	22 April 2017	

=== International competitions ===
Representing Germany & Portugal
Year	Competition	Venue	Position	Event	Time	Notes
2009	European Youth Olympic Festival	Tampere, Finland	5th	100 m	12.01	
2009	European Youth Olympic Festival	Tampere, Finland	5th	4 x 100 m relay	47.29	
2010	World Junior Championships	Moncton, Canada	6th	100 m	11.80	
2010	World Junior Championships	Moncton, Canada	2nd	4 x 100 m relay	43.74	
2011	European Junior Championships	Tallinn, Estonia	3rd	100 m	11.48	SB
2011	European Junior Championships	Tallinn, Estonia	1st	4 x 100 m relay	43.42	CR AJR
2012	European Championships	Helsinki, Finland	8th	100 m	11.62	
2012	European Championships	Helsinki, Finland	1st	4 x 100 m relay	42.51	EL
2012	Olympic Games	London, United Kingdom	31st (h)	100 m	11.39	
2012	Olympic Games	London, United Kingdom	5th	4 x 100 m relay	42.67	
2013	European Indoor Championships	Gothenburg, Sweden	16th (h)	60 m	7.41	
2013	European Team Championships Super League	Gateshead, United Kingdom	3rd	100 m	11.72	
2013	European Team Championships Super League	Gateshead, United Kingdom	2nd	4 x 100 m relay	43.15	
2013	European U23 Championships	Tampere, Finland	3rd	100 m	11.50	
2013	European U23 Championships	Tampere, Finland	1st	4 x 100 m relay	43.29	
2013	World Championships	Moscow, Russia	24th (sf)	100 m	11.49	
2013	World Championships	Moscow, Russia	4th	4 x 100 m relay	42.90	
2014	World Relays	Nassau, The Bahamas	6th	4 x 100 m relay	43.38	
2014	European Team Championships Super League	Braunschweig, Germany	6th	4 x 100 m relay	43.78	
2014	European Championships	Zürich, Switzerland	16th (sf)	100 m	11.48	
2014	European Championships	Zürich, Switzerland	—	4 x 100 m relay	DNF	
2015	World Relays	Nassau, The Bahamas	—	4 x 100 m relay	DNF	
2015	European Team Championships Super League	Cheboksary, Russia	4th	100 m	11.52	
2015	European Team Championships Super League	Cheboksary, Russia	3rd	4 x 100 m relay	43.21	
2016	World Indoor Championships	Portland, United States	14th (sf)	60 m	7.22	
2016	European Championships	Amsterdam, The Netherlands	6th	100 m	11.33	
2016	European Championships	Amsterdam, The Netherlands	3rd	4 x 100 m relay	42.48	
2016	Olympic Games	Rio de Janeiro, Brazil	21st (sf)	100 m	11.32	
2016	Olympic Games	Rio de Janeiro, Brazil	4th	4 x 100 m relay	42.10	
2017	World Relays	Nassau, The Bahamas	1st	4 x 100 m relay	42.84	WL
2017	World Relays	Nassau, The Bahamas	2nd	4 x 200 m relay	1:30.68	SB
2017	World Championships	London, United Kingdom	—	100 m	DQ	TR16.8
2017	World Championships	London, United Kingdom	4th	4 x 100 m relay	42.36	
2018	World Indoor Championships	Birmingham, United Kingdom	12th (sf)	60 m	7.18	
2018	European Championships	Berlin, Germany	9th (sf)	100 m	11.26	
2018	European Championships	Berlin, Germany	3rd	4 x 100 m relay	42.23	
2019	World Championships	Doha, Qatar	18th (sf)	100 m	11.29	
2019	World Championships	Doha, Qatar	18th (sf)	200 m	23.11	
2021	Olympic Games	Tokyo, Japan	22nd (sf)	100 m	11.35	
2021	Olympic Games	Tokyo, Japan	5th	4 x 100 m relay	42.12	
2022	World Championships	Eugene, United States	3rd	4 x 100 m relay	42.03	SB
2022	European Championships	Munich, Germany	21st (sf)	100 m	11.55	
2026	World Indoor Championships	Toruń, Poland	16th (sf)	60 m	7.20	
2026	World Relays	Gaborone, Botswana	—	4 x 100 m relay	DQ	
2026	European Championships	Birmingham, United Kingdom	16th (sf)	100 m	11.28	
2026	European Championships	Birmingham, United Kingdom	—	4 x 100 m relay	DNF	
2026	European Championships	Birmingham, United Kingdom	5th	Mixed 4 x 100 m relay	40.90	
