= Athletics at the 2016 Summer Olympics – Women's 4 × 100 metres relay =

Women's 4 × 100 metres relay at the Games of the XXXI Olympiad
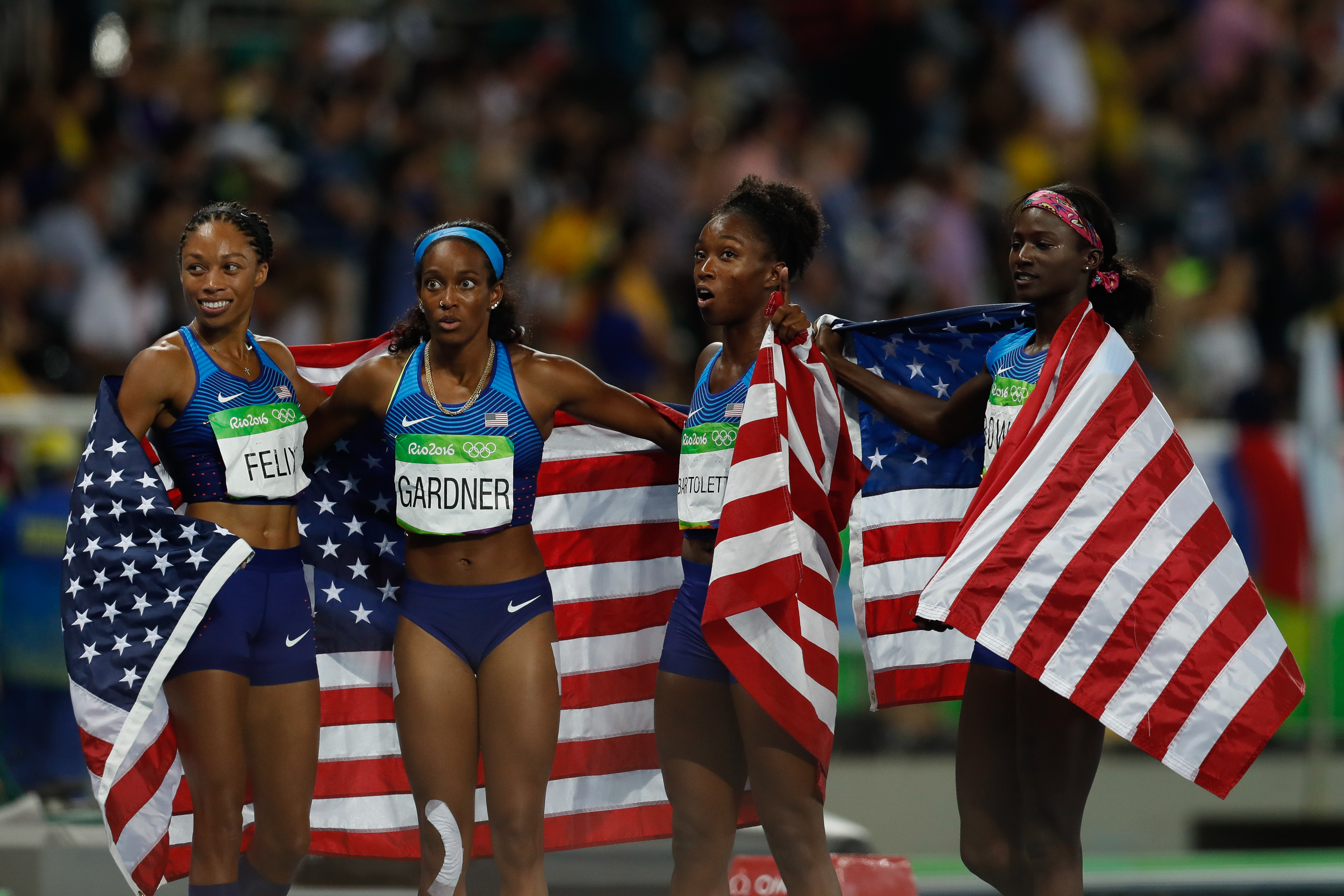
- Felix, Gardner, Bartoletta and Bowie (USA) celebrating their victory in the women's 4 × 100 metres relay
- Venue: Olympic Stadium
- Date: 18–19 August 2016
- Competitors: from 16 nations
- Teams: 16
- Winning time: 41.01

Medalists
1st place, gold medalist(s)		Tianna Bartoletta; Allyson Felix; English Gardner; Tori Bowie; Morolake Akinosun*	United States
2nd place, silver medalist(s)		Christania Williams; Elaine Thompson; Veronica Campbell-Brown; Shelly-Ann Fraser-Pryce; Simone Facey*; Shashalee Forbes*	Jamaica
3rd place, bronze medalist(s)		Asha Philip; Desirèe Henry; Dina Asher-Smith; Daryll Neita * Indicates the sprinter only competed in the preliminary heats.	Great Britain

Video on YouTube Official Video Highlights

The women's 4 × 100 metres relay competition at the 2016 Summer Olympics in Rio de Janeiro, Brazil was held at the Estádio Olímpico João Havelange on 18–19 August.

== Summary ==
The United States entered as the defending Olympic champions, having set new world and Olympic records at the 2012 London Olympics. Jamaica were the reigning world champions from 2015, having defeated the Americans there. Germany had the fastest time of the year before the event (41.62 seconds) and the other main medal contenders included Great Britain and Netherlands (all three made the 2016 European podium).

During the second heat the United States missed their second handover which was caused by Kauiza Venancio of the Brazilian team bumping Allyson Felix as she approached the handoff to English Gardner. The American appeal was upheld, and they were given a second chance to qualify for the final, which the United States team accomplished with the fastest qualifying time of 41.77.

There was no further plot twist in the final. Even though the United States were along the curb in the less advantageous lane 1, Tianna Bartoletta shot out to the lead around the first turn, making up the stagger on Canada's Farah Jacques before the halfway point in the turn. It was a clean, unobstructed pass to Allyson Felix because Canada was still waiting for the incoming runner to arrive. Felix pulled away down the backstretch, with Jamaica's double sprint gold medalist Elaine Thompson separating from the rest of the field. As English Gardner ran a great turn, USA passed Germany in lane 4, while Jamaica was just about to make up the stagger on Trinidad and Tobago to their immediate outside. By the time Gardner handed off to Tori Bowie, the USA had a 3-metre lead over Jamaica, Great Britain just ahead of Trinidad and Tobago racing for bronze. On the run in, Bowie lost some ground on the lead over Jamaica's two time Olympic gold medalist Shelly-Ann Fraser-Pryce, but still held a comfortable lead, as Great Britain's Daryll Neita separated from Trinidad and Tobago's Khalifa St. Fort, who was also caught by Germany's Rebekka Haase before the line.

The British team claimed their national record. USA ran the second fastest time in history (only behind their own world record four years earlier). Jamaica ran the fifth fastest time in history.

The following evening the medals were presented by Adam Pengilly, IOC member, Great Brittan and Víctor López, Council Member of the IAAF.

== Records ==
Prior to the competition, the existing World and Olympic records were as follows.

World record	United States (Tianna Madison, Allyson Felix, Bianca Knight, Carmelita Jeter)	40.82	London, United Kingdom	10 August 2012
Olympic record	United States (Tianna Madison, Allyson Felix, Bianca Knight, Carmelita Jeter)	40.82	London, United Kingdom	10 August 2012
2016 World leading	Germany (Tatjana Pinto, Lisa Mayer, Gina Lückenkemper, Rebekka Haase)	41.62	Mannheim, Germany	29 July 2016

The following national records were established during the competition:

Country	Athletes	Round	Time	Notes
Great Britain	Asha Philip, Desirèe Henry, Dina Asher-Smith, Daryll Neita (GBR)	Final	41.77 s	NR

== Schedule ==
All times are Brazil time (UTC−3)

Date	Time	Round
Thursday, 18 August 2016	11:20	Round 1
Friday, 19 August 2016	22:15	Finals

== Results ==
=== Round 1 ===
Qualification rule: first 3 of each heat (Q) plus the 2 fastest times (q) qualified.

==== Heat 1 ====
Rank	Lane	Nation	Competitors	Time	Notes
1	5	Jamaica	Simone Facey, Shashalee Forbes, Veronica Campbell-Brown, Shelly-Ann Fraser-Pryce	41.79	Q, SB
2	7	Great Britain	Asha Philip, Desirèe Henry, Dina Asher-Smith, Daryll Neita	41.93	Q
3	1	Ukraine	Olesya Povkh, Natalia Pohrebniak, Mariya Ryemyen, Yelyzaveta Bryzgina	42.49	Q, SB
4	4	Canada	Farah Jacques, Crystal Emmanuel, Phylicia George, Khamica Bingham	42.70	q, SB
5	6	China	Yuan Qiqi, Wei Yongli, Ge Manqi, Liang Xiaojing	42.70	
6	3	Netherlands	Jamile Samuel, Dafne Schippers, Tessa van Schagen, Naomi Sedney	42.88	
7	8	Poland	Ewa Swoboda, Marika Popowicz-Drapała, Klaudia Konopko, Anna Kiełbasińska	43.33	
8	2	Ghana	Flings Owusu-Agyapong, Gemma Acheampong, Beatrice Gyaman, Janet Amponsah	43.37	

==== Heat 2 ====
Video on YouTube Official Video Highlights

Rank	Lane	Nation	Competitors	Time	Notes
1	7	Germany	Tatjana Pinto, Lisa Mayer, Gina Luckenkemper, Rebekka Haase	42.18	Q
2	8	Nigeria	Gloria Asumnu, Blessing Okagbare, Jennifer Madu, Agnes Osazuwa	42.55	Q, SB
3	1	Trinidad and Tobago	Semoy Hackett, Michelle-Lee Ahye, Kelly-Ann Baptiste, Khalifa St. Fort	42.62	Q, SB
4	4	France	Floriane Gnafoua, Céline Distel-Bonnet, Jennifer Galais, Stella Akakpo	43.07	
5	5	Switzerland	Ajla Del Ponte, Sarah Atcho, Ellen Sprunger, Salomé Kora	43.12	
–	6	Kazakhstan	Rima Kashafutdinova, Viktoriya Zyabkina, Yuliya Rakhmanova, Olga Safronova	DQ	R 163.3a
–	3	Brazil	Bruna Farias, Franciela Krasucki, Kauiza Venancio, Rosângela Santos	DQ	R 163.2b
–	2	United States	Tianna Bartoletta, Allyson Felix, English Gardner, Morolake Akinosun	—N/a	(Note: Brazil had obstructed the American baton handover and the United States were allowed a solo run to qualify for the final on time, which they did.)

==== Special Heat 3 ====
Video on YouTube Official Video Highlights

Rank	Lane	Nation	Competitors	Time	Notes
1	2	United States	Tianna Bartoletta, Allyson Felix, English Gardner, Morolake Akinosun	41.77	q

=== Final ===
Rank	Lane	Nation	Competitors	Time	Notes
1st place, gold medalist(s)	1	United States	Tianna Bartoletta, Allyson Felix, English Gardner, Tori Bowie	41.01	SB
2nd place, silver medalist(s)	6	Jamaica	Christania Williams, Elaine Thompson, Veronica Campbell-Brown, Shelly-Ann Fraser-Pryce	41.36	SB
3rd place, bronze medalist(s)	5	Great Britain	Asha Philip, Desirèe Henry, Dina Asher-Smith, Daryll Neita	41.77	NR
4	4	Germany	Tatjana Pinto, Lisa Mayer, Gina Luckenkemper, Rebekka Haase	42.10	
5	7	Trinidad and Tobago	Semoy Hackett, Michelle-Lee Ahye, Kelly-Ann Baptiste, Khalifa St. Fort	42.12	SB
6	8	Ukraine	Olesya Povkh, Natalia Pohrebniak, Mariya Ryemyen, Yelyzaveta Bryzgina	42.36	SB
7	2	Canada	Farah Jacques, Crystal Emmanuel, Phylicia George, Khamica Bingham	43.15	
8	3	Nigeria	Gloria Asumnu, Blessing Okagbare, Jennifer Madu, Agnes Osazuwa	43.21	
