= Jodie Williams =

British sprinter

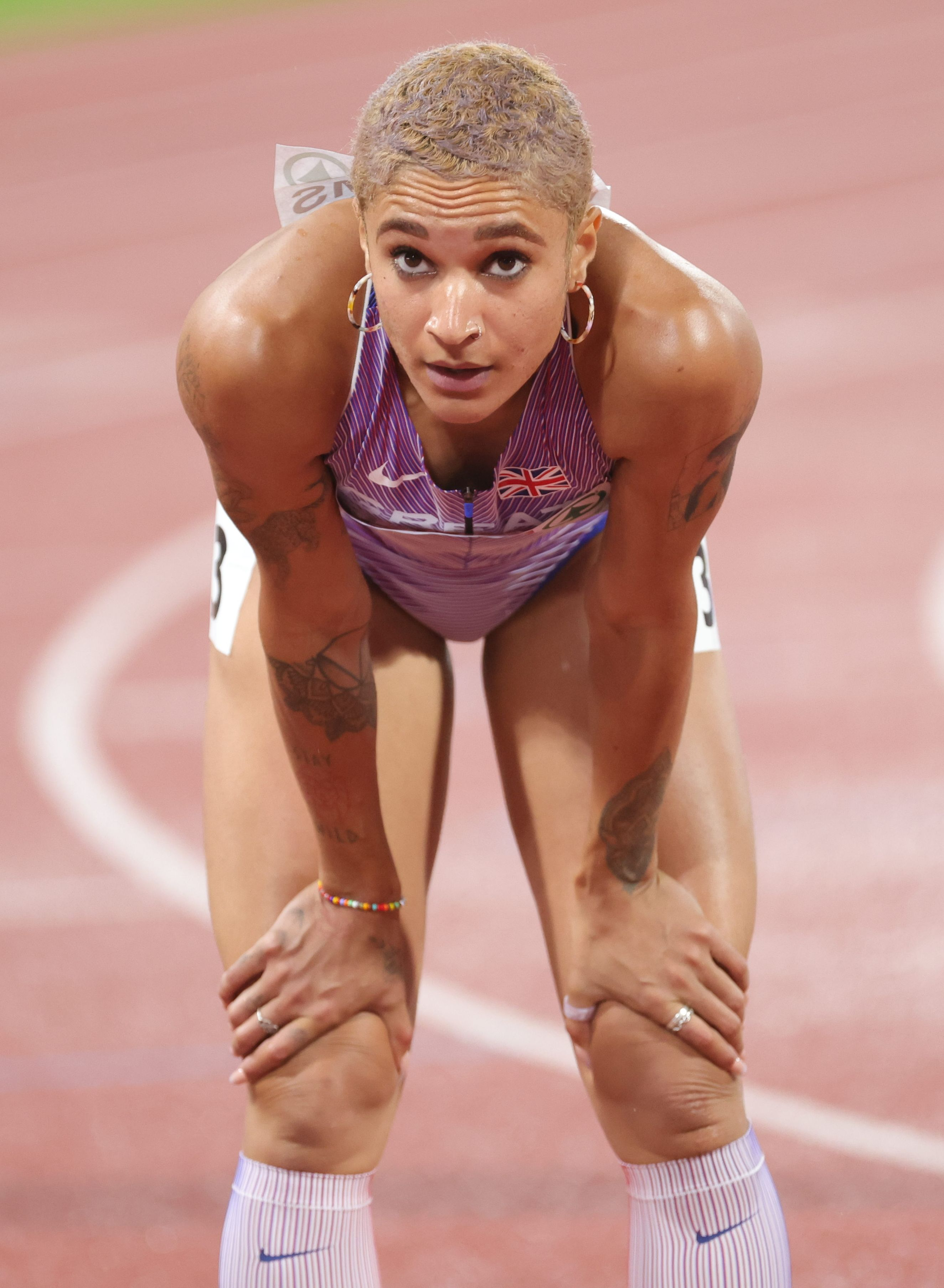
- Williams at the 2022 European Athletics Championships

Personal information
- Full name: Jodie Alicia Williams
- Born: 28 September 1993 (age 33) Welwyn Garden City, Hertfordshire, England
- Height: 1.74 m (5 ft 9 in)
- Weight: 60 kg (132 lb)

Sport
- Country: Great Britain & N.I. England
- Sport: Women's athletics
- Events: 100 metres, 200 metres, 400 metres
- Club: Herts Phoenix AC

Achievements and titles
- Personal bests: 100 m: 11.17 (Lubbock, 2019); 200 m: 22.46 (Zürich, 2014); 400 m: 49.97 (Tokyo, 2021)
Medal record
Women's athletics
Representing Great Britain
Olympic Games
Bronze medal – third place	2024 Paris	4 × 400 m relay
European Championships
Gold medal – first place	2014 Zürich	4 × 100 m relay
Silver medal – second place	2014 Zürich	200 m
Bronze medal – third place	2022 Munich	4 × 400 m relay
European Indoor Championships
Silver medal – second place	2021 Toruń	4 × 400 m relay
Bronze medal – third place	2021 Toruń	400 m
World Junior Championships
Gold medal – first place	2010 Moncton	100 m
Silver medal – second place	2010 Moncton	200 m
World Youth Championships
Gold medal – first place	2009 Brixen	100 m
Gold medal – first place	2009 Brixen	200 m
European U23 Championships
Gold medal – first place	2013 Tampere	200 m
Silver medal – second place	2013 Tampere	100 m
Silver medal – second place	2013 Tampere	4 × 100 m relay
European Junior Championships
Gold medal – first place	2011 Tallinn	100 m
Gold medal – first place	2011 Tallinn	200 m
Bronze medal – third place	2011 Tallinn	4 × 100 m relay
Representing England
Commonwealth Games
Silver medal – second place	2014 Glasgow	200 m
Bronze medal – third place	2014 Glasgow	4 × 100 m relay
Bronze medal – third place	2022 Birmingham	400 m

Jodie Alicia Williams (born 28 September 1993) is a British retired sprinter who specialised in the 400 metres, having begun her career concentrating on 100 and 200 metres.

As a junior in the shorter sprints, she is the 2009 World Youth Champion at 100 and 200 m, the 2010 World Junior Champion at 100 m, the 2011 European Junior Champion at 100 and 200 m, and the 2013 European U23 Champion at 200 m.

Williams had a five-year-long unbeaten streak of 151 races in the sprints, beginning with the start of her athletics career in 2005 and lasting until July 2010, when she was runner-up to Stormy Kendrick in the 200 m at the World Junior Championships. Williams is the British youth record holder over the 60 m, 100 m and 200 m. At the age of sixteen, she was the top-ranked British woman over 200 m in 2010.

After a difficult beginning to her senior career following recurring injuries, in 2014 Williams won her first senior medals, representing England at the 2014 Commonwealth Games; a bronze in the 4 × 100 metres relay, and a silver in the 200 metres. Weeks later she repeated the silver medal for 200 metres at the 2014 European Championships, before winning her first senior gold medal as part of the Great Britain relay team that broke the British record in the 4 × 100 metres relay.

Further injuries stalled her senior progress as Williams transitioned to the longer sprint, although she won several senior British championships in the years between 2014 and 2021. In 2021, her transition bore fruit, winning individual bronze over 400 metres at the 2021 European Athletics Indoor Championships along with relay silver. At the 2022 European Championships, she was also part of British 4 × 400 quartet than ran the second fastest time ever (3:21.74) by a British women's team while Williams again won bronze at the 2022 Commonwealth Games for England.

In 2024, aged 30, Williams was selected for her third Olympic Games as a relay-only runner. Williams finally won her first senior global medal, an Olympic bronze medal, as a heat-running member of the Great Britain women's 4 x 400 metres relay squad that finished third at the 2024 Summer Olympics. Four months later, with nine international medals and four British national titles, Williams announced her retirement from elite track and field athletics.

== Background ==
Williams was born in Welwyn Garden City, Hertfordshire, to an English father, Richard Williams, and an English mother of Trinidadian and Vincentian descent, Christine Williams. Both of her parents were county-level sprinters. Richard ran for Hertfordshire, while Christine ran for Sussex. She also has two siblings, her younger brother Ben and younger sister Hannah Williams.

Williams began to take athletics seriously when she was 13 years old.

Williams was educated at Heath Mount School and Queenswood School, Hertfordshire, before attending Dame Alice Owen's School, in Potters Bar, Hertfordshire.

Williams has been described as the "sort of athlete every country is waiting for" by former UK Athletics Head Coach, Charles Van Commenee, and has also been praised by Allyson Felix, who stated "I think Jodie has great potential. She's young but she can still accomplish a lot of things".

== Career ==
=== 2009: World Youth Champion ===
She took the England Athletics Under-20 Championships in 100 m, in a time of 11.48 s. She then went to Brixen, Italy for the World Youth Championships to take part in the 100 m and 200 m. In the 100 m semi-final, she set a world-leading time for a youth athlete of 11.40 s. In the event final she ran 0.01 s quicker to clinch her first world title, defeating Ashton Purvis and Alison Peter. In the 200 m final, she ran another youth world leading time of 23.08 s to clinch another gold medal, making her the first girl to achieve a 100/200 m sprint double at the competition.

=== 2010: World Junior Championships ===
In 2010, Williams started off her season in strong form – at the Loughborough Games, she broke the 200 m British junior record when she ran 22.79 s, beating a strong field including senior Olympian Joice Maduaka. A week later, at the Bedford International Games, she broke the 100 m British junior record when she ran 11.24 s. After winning both the events at the England Athletics U20 Championships, she set off for the 2010 World Junior Championships, which were to be held in Moncton, Canada.

Williams carried on her unbeaten run by winning the 100 m final in a time of 11.40 s to make it 149 races unbeaten. In the 200 m, Williams was the fastest qualifier, but suffered her first defeat in 151 races by coming second in the final to American Stormy Kendrick. In the 4 × 100 m relay, the Great Britain team was eliminated after a failed baton exchange between Williams and Rebekah Wilson.

=== 2011: Indoor Season & Double European Junior Champion ===
In 2011, Williams became the youngest winner of the UK Indoor Championships over the 60 m, since 15-year-old Sonia Lannaman won in 1971. She ran a personal best of 7.24 s in a strong British field that included Bernice Wilson and Jeanette Kwakye to make the British team for the European Indoor Championships, her first senior British team.

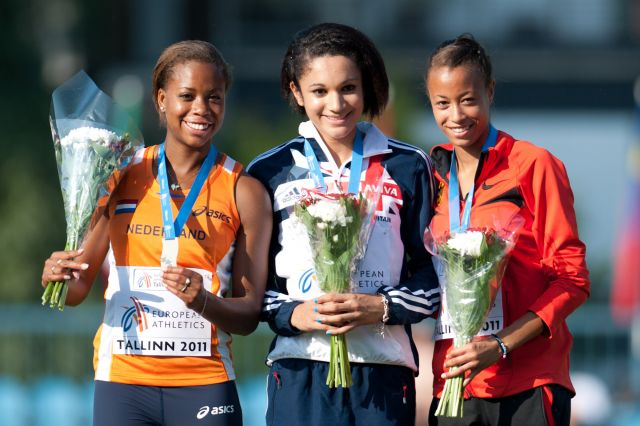
Williams (middle) after the 2011 European Athletics Junior Championships.

At the European Indoor Championships in Paris, Williams ran 7.21 s in the European Indoor Championships 60 m final, finishing fourth. She had missed out on a medal by 0.01 s, but despite this, she said she had "surprised herself".

In July, at the European Junior Championships, Williams won the 100 m setting a new personal best and championship record of 11.18 s, breaking the previous record by 0.03 s. She explained "I've been training better than last year and my times in training have been better than last year so I knew I had 11.1 in me, I've just not had the right conditions until today."

Within 24 hours, she also won the 200 m in a season's best of 22.94 s – despite a strong headwind of −1.5 m/s to complete a sprint double, an unprecedented achievement for a British woman. To end the championships, she ran on the fourth leg of the 4 × 100 m relay to collect a bronze medal along with her teammates. At the end of the season, she was voted as the women's European Athletics Rising Star.

=== 2012: Indoor Season & Missing the 2012 London Olympics ===
Williams ran a season's best time of 7.29 s and finished second behind Jeanette Kwakye at the Aviva UK Indoor Championships. She was subsequently chosen to run at the Indoor World Championships in Istanbul. Before the Championships began, Williams stated that her aim was to make the semi-finals at the championships. In her heat, she came third with a time of 7.40 s and in her semi-final she came fifth with a time of 7.32 s and did not advance to the final.

"I didn’t enjoy my success at all as a junior, I was expected to win because that’s what I did. I felt a lot of pressure and a lot of isolation from my peers because I was doing something so different to what the rest of my friends and rest of people my age were doing."

— Williams reflecting on her junior career.

After the World Indoor Championships, Williams announced that she was to focus on getting selected for the 100 m at the London 2012 Games. She stated, "Now it's onwards and upwards for the Olympics. I'm really concentrating on the 100m because it's always been a dream of mine to do the 100 m at the Olympics." However, throughout the summer season, Williams was struggling with a number of injuries. Before the Olympic Trials she had only raced once, which was a time of 11.87 s (-1.3), 0.69 s off of her personal best, at the Watford Open Graded Meeting.

At the Aviva Olympic Trials, Williams won her heat in 11.70 s (0.2) and came fourth in her semi-final in 11.66 s (-0.6). She had qualified for the final but was unable to finish the race due to a pulled hamstring.

Speaking about her injury-plagued 2012 season, Williams stated, "I just had so much going on and my body just started to break down." She added, "It was tough to sit back and watch it, to see other people [competing], and thinking I could have been there at the home Olympics, but then I told myself I'm 18 and there's hopefully plenty more Olympics ahead of me. It wasn't nice sitting at home, and it took me a while to get over that."

=== 2013: European Under 23 Champion & World Championships ===
In the aftermath of the London Olympics, Williams said, "My confidence took a knock as I didn't compete to the standard I would have liked to. It's hard not to have your confidence knocked from that. But I've had to just learn from the mistakes and move on." Commenting that she is now free of education and able to train full-time, "I don't know how I did the last few years." Talking about her expectations for the 2013 season, she said, "This year it's about getting into the senior worlds and taking it slow," she says. "But long term, the goal's still the same: to be the best in the world."

Williams qualified for the European U23 Championships by clinching a 100 m/200 m double at the England Athletics U23 Championships winning the 100 m at 11.56 s (0.7) and the 200 m at 23.21 s (0.5).

At the European U23 Championships, Williams finished second in the 100 m final, running a time of 11.42 (-0.7) to finish behind Dafne Schippers. In the 200 m final, Williams posted a time of 22.92 s (-0.5) to claim the gold medal over Lénora Guion-Firmin and claim her sixth age-group international title. She competed in her first senior international competition at the World Championships in Moscow later in the year, reaching the semi-finals of the 200 m.

=== 2014: Commonwealth Games and European Championships ===
In February 2014, after qualifying for the British 60 m indoor final, she fainted before the race and had to pull out.

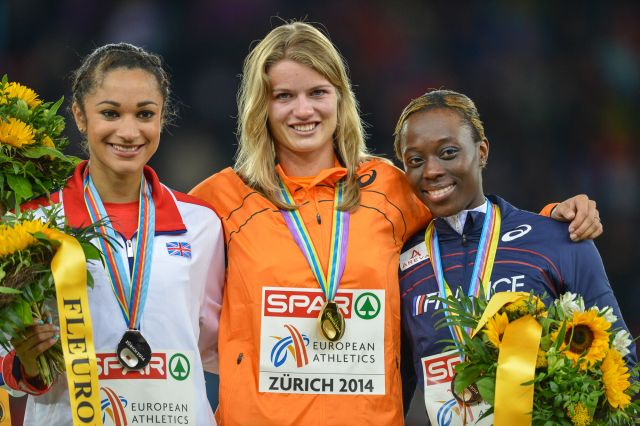
Williams (left) on the medal podium after the 200 m at the 2014 European Athletics Championships.

On 19 April, Williams competed at the Tom Jones Memorial in Gainesville, Florida. Over the 100 m, she ran a time of 11.20 s (1.3). On the same day, she competed over the 200 m and ran a personal best time of 22.76 s (0.0). The result moved her up to joint ninth on the British all-time list for 200 m. She made her Diamond League debut at the Bislett Games in Oslo on 11 June, finishing second behind Allyson Felix over 200 m in a time of 22.98 s. At the British Championships, Williams won over 200 m in 22.79 s and placed third over 100 m in a wind-assisted time of 11.15 s (+3.6). She improved her 200 m personal best to 22.60 s in finishing fourth at the Glasgow Diamond League on 12 July.

In July, Williams competed for England at the Commonwealth Games in Glasgow. In the 200 m final on 31 July, she won her first senior medal, a silver, in a new personal best of 22.50. The time moved her to equal second on the UK all-time list at the time, alongside Abi Oyepitan and behind Kathy Smallwood-Cook. The race was won by Blessing Okagbare with Williams' compatriot, Bianca Williams finishing in third. She was also part of the bronze-medal winning 4 × 100 m relay team alongside her compatriots Williams, Ashleigh Nelson and Asha Philip.

At the European Championships in Zurich, Williams won a silver medal in the 200 m, running a personal best of 22.46 s to finish second behind Dafne Schippers. Following the final, she stated "To come away with two silver medals, I couldn’t ask for any more, I’m so happy." She later won a gold medal in the 4 × 100 m relay, with the quartet of Williams, Nelson, Desiree Henry and Dina Asher-Smith setting a new British record of 42.24 s.

=== 2015-2017: Olympic debut ===
"I had moved to the US and made this drastic change and everything was geared towards the Olympics, but I really wanted to make the final and I had a very big crash post-Olympics. I was mentally and physically exhausted and was struggling to bounce back. I didn’t feel any point in doing this any more. I almost burnt out."

— Williams reflecting on the 2016 Summer Olympics.

Despite an injury-interrupted 2015 season, Williams was able to make the team for the 4 × 100 m relay at that year's World Championships, where she was part of the British team that placed fourth in the final and ran a new national record of 42.10 s.

After switching to train in Phoenix, Arizona during the winter, Williams placed third over 200 m at the 2016 British Championships, running 23.22 s in the final. At the European Championships held in Amsterdam, she finished sixth in the 200 m final. On 23 July, she competed at the London Anniversary Games, placing fifth in the 200 m with a time of 22.99 s. Williams made her Olympic debut at the Rio Olympics in August, reaching the semi-finals of the 200 m.

=== 2018-2020: 2019 World Championships ===
At the 2018 British Championships, Williams placed third behind Beth Dobbin and Bianca Williams in the 200 m, running 22.78 s. She competed at the Berlin European Championships in August, where she was eliminated in the semi-finals.

The following year, on 4 May, Williams broke her eight-year old 100 m personal best, by running 11.17 s at the Masked Rider Open in Lubbock, Texas. She ran her first 400 m in four years at the Résisprint International in La Chaux-de-Fonds, setting a major personal best of 51.22 s. At the British Championships in August, Williams became British champion for the second time by winning the 200 m in a time of 23.06 s, ran into a headwind of -4.3 m/s. In October, she competed at the World Championships in Doha where she was eliminated in the semi-finals of the 200 m and placed fourth in the 4 × 400 m relay alongside her teammates Zoey Clark, Emily Diamond and Laviai Nielsen.

=== 2021: Successful 400 m switch and Olympic final ===
"I saw the lane draw and knew it would be tough, but I thought: ‘I have to do it the hard way’ and I did it. 2014 was the last time I was on an international podium, but I am a determined woman, I cannot quit on myself."

— Williams after the 2021 European Indoor Championships

In February 2021, Williams won the 400 m at the British selection trials for the European Indoor Championships, in a time of 52.27 s. At the Championships in Torun, she won a bronze medal in the 400 m, running an indoor personal best of 51.73 s from lane one to finish behind Femke Bol and Justyna Swiety-Ersetic. She later won a silver medal in the 4 × 400 m relay alongside British teammates Clark, Ama Pipi, and Jessie Knight.

She improved her 400 m personal best to 51.01 s in finishing second at the Track Meet in Irvine, California on 15 May. At the British Championships on 26 June, Williams won the 400 m in 51.02 s, just 0.01 s off of her personal best. She returned the following day to also win the 200 m in 23.02 s, becoming the first woman to win both the 200 m and 400 m at the British Championships since Donna Fraser in 2005. On 13 July, at the Anniversary Games in Gateshead, she improved her 400 m personal best to 50.94 s, her first time under the 51-second barrier, to finish second behind Stephanie Ann McPherson. She also placed second in the 200 m in 22.60 s, the equal third fastest time of her career.

At the COVID-delayed 2020 Tokyo Olympics, Williams ran a major 400 m personal best of 49.97 s in her semi-final to finish second behind Shaunae Miller-Uibo and make the Olympic final. The time took nearly a second off of her personal best, was her first time under the 50-second barrier and propelled her to sixth on the British all-time top list. In the final, she equalled her newly-set personal best to finish sixth. She also ran as part of the British quartet in the women's 4 × 400 m relay, where the team of Williams, Pipi, Diamond and Nicole Yeargin placed fifth.

=== 2022-2024: Olympic and Commonwealth medals ===
Despite suffering with injuries throughout 2022, at that year's Commonwealth Games in Birmingham, Williams ran a season's best of 51.26 s to win bronze behind Sada Williams and Victoria Ohuruogu, her first senior international medal in the 400 m. She also competed at the European Championships held in late August, where she placed fourth in the 200 m, running a time of 22.85 s. She returned to win a bronze medal in the women's 4 × 400 m relay.

At the 2024 British Championships, she placed fifth in the 400 m, running a season's best of 51.58 s. On 20 July, she placed fourth in the national 400 m at the London Diamond League, running 52.06 s. At the Paris Olympics, Williams competed in the heats of the women's 4 × 400 m relay alongside Yemi Mary John, Hannah Kelly and Lina Nielsen as the team successfully qualified for the final. The British team went onto place third in the final, netting Williams a bronze medal for her run in the heats.

Following her Olympic bronze, Williams announced her retirement from athletics in October 2024.

== Outside athletics ==
Williams was featured on the National Portrait Gallery's 'Road to 2012: Aiming High' exhibition which featured Williams amongst many other athletes. She finished runner-up to Tom Daley twice (2009 and 2010) for the BBC Young Sports Personality of the Year award.

She has hosted a podcast called Coffee Conversations, centred around interviewing women who are challenging 'the norm', including Hafsatu Kamara and Phylicia George. She has also worked with the Women's Alliance and helped to fund the development of female athletes in East Africa. Williams set up an online platform called the "Listen Journal", which has hosted conversations between women from underrepresented communities.

== Major competitive record ==
Representing Great Britain / England
Year	Competition	Venue	Position	Event	Notes
2009	World Youth Championships	Brixen, Italy	1st	100 m	11.39
2009	World Youth Championships	Brixen, Italy	1st	200 m	23.08
2010	World Junior Championships	Moncton, New Brunswick, Canada	1st	100 m	11.40 (-0.7 m/s)
2010	World Junior Championships	Moncton, New Brunswick, Canada	2nd	200 m	23.19 (-0.5 m/s)
2010	World Junior Championships	Moncton, New Brunswick, Canada	—	4 × 100 m relay	DNF
2011	European Indoor Championships	Paris, France	4th	60 m	7.21
2011	European Junior Championships	Tallinn, Estonia	1st	100 m	11.18
2011	European Junior Championships	Tallinn, Estonia	1st	200 m	22.94
2011	European Junior Championships	Tallinn, Estonia	3rd	4 × 100 m	45.00
2012	World Indoor Championships	Istanbul, Turkey	16th (sf)	60 m	7.32
2013	European U23 Championships	Tampere, Finland	2nd	100 m	11.42 (-0.7 m/s)
2013	European U23 Championships	Tampere, Finland	1st	200 m	22.92 (-0.5 m/s)
2013	European U23 Championships	Tampere, Finland	2nd	4 × 100 m	43.83
2013	World Championships	Moscow, Russia	18th (sf)	200 m	23.21
2014	Commonwealth Games	Glasgow, Scotland	2nd	200 m	22.50
2014	Commonwealth Games	Glasgow, Scotland	3rd	4 × 100 m relay	43.10
2014	European Championships	Zurich, Switzerland	2nd	200 m	22.46
2014	European Championships	Zurich, Switzerland	1st	4 × 100 m relay	42.25 NR
2015	World Championships	Beijing, China	4th	4 × 100 m relay	42.10
2016	Olympic Games	Rio de Janeiro, Brazil	22nd (sf)	200 m	22.99
2018	European Championships	Berlin, Germany	13th (sf)	200 m	23.28
2019	World Championships	Doha, Qatar	11th (sf)	200 m	22.78
2019	World Championships	Doha, Qatar	4th	4 × 400 m relay	3:23.02
2021	European Indoor Championships	Toruń, Poland	3rd	400 m	51.73
2021	Olympic Games	Tokyo, Japan	6th	400 m	49.97
2021	Olympic Games	Tokyo, Japan	5th	4 × 400 m relay	3:22.59
2022	Commonwealth Games	Birmingham, United Kingdom	3rd	400 m	51.26
2022	European Championships	Munich, Germany	4th	200 m	22.85
2022	European Championships	Munich, Germany	3rd	4 × 400 m relay	3:21.74
2024	Olympic Games	Paris, France	2nd (h)	4 × 400 m relay	3:24.72

== Personal bests ==
Distance	Time (sec)	Venue	Date
60 m (indoors)	7.21	Paris, France	5 March 2011
100 metres	11.17	Lubbock, TX, USA	4 May 2019
200 metres	22.46	Zürich, Switzerland	15 August 2014
400 metres	49.97	Tokyo, Japan	4 August 2021
400 m (indoors)	51.73	Toruń, Poland	6 March 2021
