= Kauiza Venancio =

Brazilian sprinter

Kauiza Venancio (born June 11, 1987 in Curitiba) is a Brazilian sprinter. She competed at the 2016 Summer Olympics in the women's 200 metres race and the women's 4 × 100 metres relay. In the 200 metres race, her time of 23.06 seconds in the heats did not qualify her for the semifinals, and the Brazilian team was disqualified from the relay.
