= Ella Nelson =

Australian sprinter (born 1994)

Personal information
- Born: 10 May 1994 (age 31) Sydney, Australia
- Education: University of Wollongong; University of Sydney
- Height: 1.69 m (5 ft 7 in)
- Weight: 58 kg (128 lb)

Sport
- Sport: Athletics
- Event: 200 metres

Ella Nelson (born 10 May 1994) is an Australian former sprinter specialising in the 200 metres.

She competed in the 200m and 4 × 100 m relay at the 2014 Commonwealth Games held in Glasgow, Scotland, the 200m at the 2015 World Championships in Beijing, China and the 2017 World Championships held in London. In Rio de Janeiro, Brazil she represented Australia in the 200 metres at the 2016 Summer Olympics where she ran a personal best of 22.50 in the semi-finals finishing third just missing the final by 100th of a second but to place 9th in the event overall out of 72 competitors.

Nelson won the Women's Open Australian 200m championship in 2014, 2015 and 2016 and is the 6th fastest of all time ranked Australian over this distance.

In January 2021, she announced her retirement from professional sports.

== International competitions ==
| Year | Competition | Venue | Position | Event | Notes |
Representing Australia
| 2010 | World Junior Championships | Moncton, Canada | 16th (sf) | 200 m | 24.06 |
| 2010 | World Junior Championships | Moncton, Canada | 7th | 4 × 100 m relay | 45.57 |
| 2012 | World Junior Championships | Barcelona, Spain | – | 4 × 100 m relay | DQ |
| 2014 | IAAF World Relays | Nassau, Bahamas | 19th (h) | 4 × 100 m relay | 44.69 |
| 2014 | Commonwealth Games | Glasgow, United Kingdom | 13th (sf) | 200 m | 23.50 |
| 2014 | Commonwealth Games | Glasgow, United Kingdom | 5th | 4 × 100 m relay | 44.21 |
| 2015 | World Championships | Beijing, China | 38th (h) | 200 m | 23.33 |
| 2016 | Olympic Games | Rio de Janeiro, Brazil | 9th (sf) | 200 m | 22.50 |
| 2017 | IAAF World Relays | Nassau, Bahamas | 4th (h) | 4 × 400 m relay | 3:30.31 |
| 2017 | World Championships | London, United Kingdom | 43rd (h) | 200 m | 24.02 |

=== Diamond League Meets ===
| Year | Competition | Venue | Position | Event | Notes |
|---|---|---|---|---|---|
| 2016 | Meeting de Paris | Paris, France | 5th | 200 m | 22.82 |
| 2017 | Bislett Games | Oslo, Norway | 6th | 200 m | 23.42 |
| 2017 | Bauhaus-Galan | Stockholm, Sweden | 6th | 200 m | 23.27 |

== Personal bests ==
Outdoor

- 100 metres – 11.42 (+1.7 m/s, Canberra 2016)
- 200 metres – 22.50 (+0.1 m/s, Rio de Janeiro 2016)

Indoor

- 60 meters - 7.48 (Flagstaff 2017)
