= 2014 Bislett Games =

- Dates: 11 June 2014
- Host city: Oslo, Norway
- Venue: Bislett Stadium
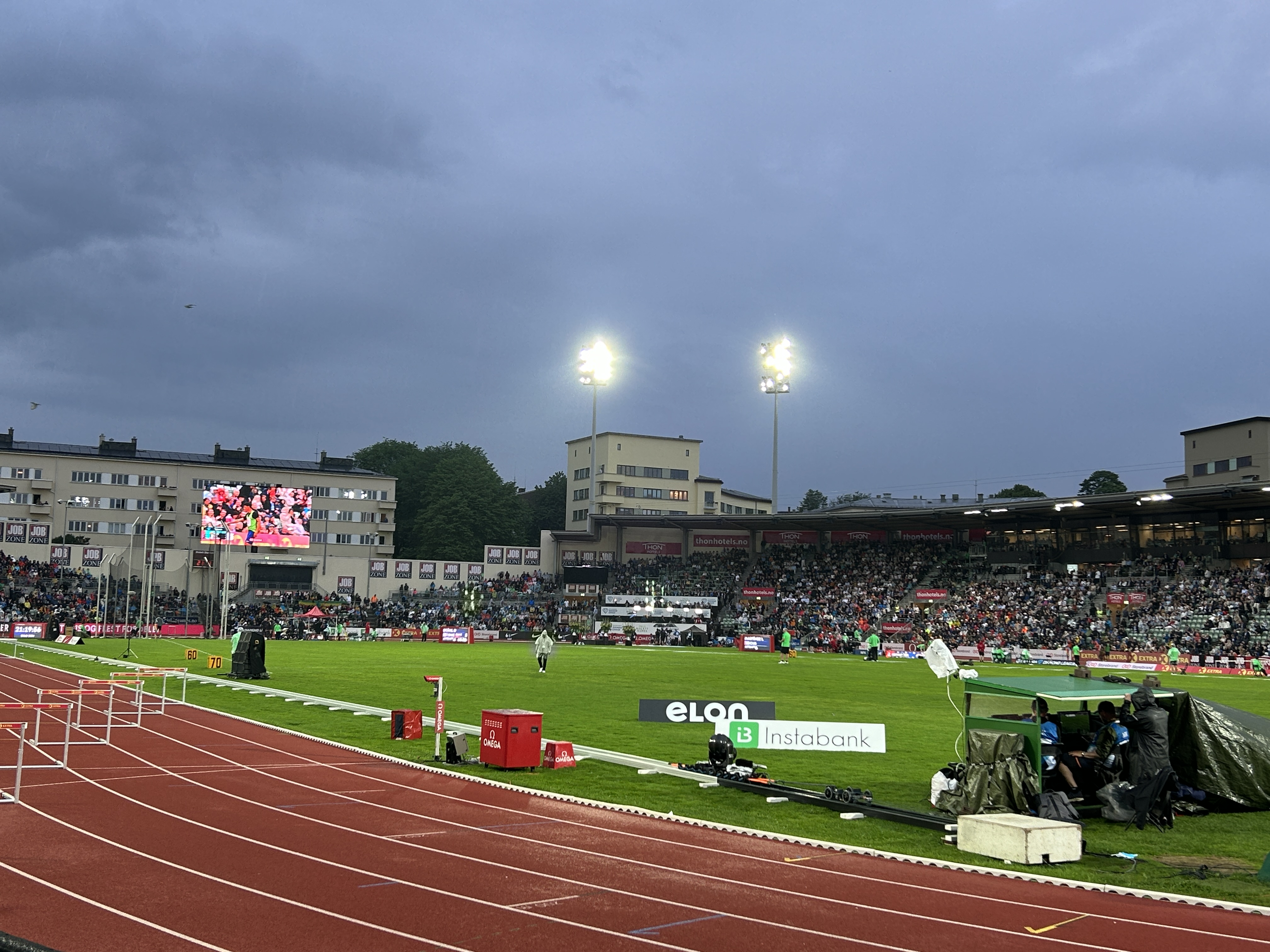
- Level: 2014 Diamond League

The 2014 Bislett Games was the 50th edition of the annual outdoor track and field meeting in Oslo, Norway. Held on 11 June at Bislett Stadium, it was the fifth leg of the 2014 Diamond League – the highest level international track and field circuit.

== Diamond discipline results ==
Podium finishers earned points towards a season leaderboard (4-2-1 respectively) points per event were then doubled in the Diamond League Finals. Athletes had to take part in the Diamond race during the finals to be eligible to win the Diamond trophy which is awarded to the athlete with the most points at the end of the season.

=== Men's ===
100 metres
Rank	Athlete	Nation	Time	Points	Notes
1st place, gold medalist(s)	Richard Thompson	Trinidad and Tobago	10.02	4	
2nd place, silver medalist(s)	Jimmy Vicaut	France	10.04	2	
3rd place, bronze medalist(s)	Adam Gemili	Great Britain	10.11	1	
4	Kim Collins	Saint Kitts and Nevis	10.13		
5	Jaysuma Saidy Ndure	Norway	10.19		SB
6	Simon Magakwe	South Africa	10.28		
7	Richard Kilty	Great Britain	10.29		
8	Danny Talbot	Great Britain	10.31		
			Wind: (−0.6 m/s)		

Mile
Rank	Athlete	Nation	Time	Points	Notes
1st place, gold medalist(s)	Ayanleh Souleiman	Djibouti	3:49.49	4	
2nd place, silver medalist(s)	Nick Willis	New Zealand	3:49.83	2	PB
3rd place, bronze medalist(s)	Homiyu Tesfaye	Germany	3:49.86	1	
4	Henrik Ingebrigtsen	Norway	3:50.72		NR
5	Mahiedine Mekhissi-Benabbad	France	3:51.55		
6	Mekonnen Gebremedhin	Ethiopia	3:51.59		SB
7	İlham Tanui Özbilen	Turkey	3:51.71		
8	Matthew Centrowitz Jr.	United States	3:52.23		
9	Bethwell Birgen	Kenya	3:53.96		
10	Johan Cronje	South Africa	3:54.24		
11	Paul Robinson	Ireland	3:54.77		PB
12	Pieter-Jan Hannes	Belgium	3:55.33		
—	Chris O'Hare	Great Britain	DNF		
—	Bram Som	Netherlands	DNF		PM
—	Geoffrey Rono	Kenya	DNF		PM

5000 metres
Rank	Athlete	Nation	Time	Points	Notes
1st place, gold medalist(s)	Yenew Alamirew	Ethiopia	13:01.57	4	WL
2nd place, silver medalist(s)	Caleb Ndiku	Kenya	13:02.15	2	
3rd place, bronze medalist(s)	Galen Rupp	United States	13:03.35	1	SB
4	Thomas Longosiwa	Kenya	13:04.68		SB
5	Edwin Soi	Kenya	13:08.36		
6	Isiah Koech	Kenya	13:08.46		
7	Dejen Gebremeskel	Ethiopia	13:09.73		
8	Cornelius Kangogo	Kenya	13:13.03		
9	Andrew Bumbalough	United States	13:13.67		SB
10	Albert Rop	Brunei	13:18.90		
11	John Kipkoech	Kenya	13:24.02		
12	Lopez Lomong	United States	13:25.80		
13	Zane Robertson	New Zealand	13:27.09		
14	Imane Merga	Ethiopia	13:29.43		SB
15	Debeli Gezmu	Ethiopia	13:29.81		
16	Brett Robinson	Australia	13:46.09		SB
17	Sindre Buraas	Norway	13:52.76		
—	Arne Gabius	Germany	DNF		
—	Vincent Kipsang Rono	Kenya	DNF		PM
—	Gideon Gathimba	Kenya	DNF		PM

110 metres hurdles
Rank	Athlete	Nation	Time	Points	Notes
1st place, gold medalist(s)	Pascal Martinot-Lagarde	France	13.12	4	WL
2nd place, silver medalist(s)	Andrew Riley	Jamaica	13.36	2	
3rd place, bronze medalist(s)	Sergey Shubenkov	Russia	13.37	1	
4	William Sharman	Great Britain	13.38		
5	Hansle Parchment	Jamaica	13.39		
6	Jason Richardson	United States	13.45		=SB
7	Ryan Wilson	United States	13.54		
8	Vladimir Vukicevic	Norway	13.94		
			Wind: (−0.6 m/s)		

3000 metres steeplechase
Rank	Athlete	Nation	Time	Points	Notes
1st place, gold medalist(s)	Jairus Birech	Kenya	8:02.37	4	WL
2nd place, silver medalist(s)	Evan Jager	United States	8:06.97	2	
3rd place, bronze medalist(s)	Hillary Yego	Kenya	8:10.93	1	
4	Paul Kipsiele Koech	Kenya	8:14.29		PM
5	Gilbert Kirui	Kenya	8:15.32		
6	Brahim Taleb	Morocco	8:15.48		SB
7	Daniel Huling	United States	8:15.87		SB
8	Bernard Nganga	Kenya	8:18.22		
9	Abel Mutai	Kenya	8:19.28		
10	Brimin Kipruto	Kenya	8:20.93		
11	Łukasz Parszczyński	Poland	8:35.56		
—	Hamid Ezzine	Morocco	DNF		
—	Haron Lagat	Kenya	DNF		PM

Pole vault
Rank	Athlete	Nation	Height	Points	Notes
1st place, gold medalist(s)	Renaud Lavillenie	France	5.77 m	4	
2nd place, silver medalist(s)	Malte Mohr	Germany	5.70 m	2	SB
3rd place, bronze medalist(s)	Konstantinos Filippidis	Greece	5.60 m	1	
4	Thiago Braz	Brazil	5.47 m		SB
~~5~~	~~Dmitry Starodubtsev~~	~~Russia~~	~~5.47 m~~		DQ (Note: Due to doping violations Starodubtsev's results from this competition were disqualified.)
6	Jan Kudlička	Czech Republic	5.32 m		
6	Augusto Dutra de Oliveira	Brazil	5.32 m		
8	Lázaro Borges	Cuba	5.32 m		
9	Raphael Holzdeppe	Germany	5.32 m		
10	Eirik Greibrokk Dolve	Norway	5.17 m		

Triple jump
Rank	Athlete	Nation	Distance	Points	Notes
1st place, gold medalist(s)	Will Claye	United States	17.41 m (+0.3 m/s)	4	
2nd place, silver medalist(s)	Christian Taylor	United States	17.15 m (+0.2 m/s)	2	SB
3rd place, bronze medalist(s)	Ernesto Revé	Cuba	16.96 m (+1.4 m/s)	1	
4	Lázaro Martínez	Cuba	16.82 m (+0.4 m/s)		
~~5~~	~~Lyukman Adams~~	~~Russia~~	~~16.73 m (+0.3 m/s)~~		DQ (Note: Due to doping violations Adams' results from this competition were disqualified.)
6	Omar Craddock	United States	16.67 m (−1.5 m/s)		
7	Godfrey Khotso Mokoena	South Africa	16.38 m (+1.1 m/s)		
8	Phillips Idowu	Great Britain	16.30 m (+1.2 m/s)		

Shot put
Rank	Athlete	Nation	Distance	Points	Notes
1st place, gold medalist(s)	Joe Kovacs	United States	21.14 m	4	
2nd place, silver medalist(s)	David Storl	Germany	21.08 m	2	
3rd place, bronze medalist(s)	Reese Hoffa	United States	21.07 m	1	
4	Germán Lauro	Argentina	20.60 m		
5	Tomasz Majewski	Poland	20.22 m		
6	Ladislav Prášil	Czech Republic	20.14 m		
7	Christian Cantwell	United States	19.47 m		
8	Stian Andersen	Norway	16.87 m		
—	Asmir Kolašinac	Serbia	NM		

Javelin throw
Rank	Athlete	Nation	Distance	Points	Notes
1st place, gold medalist(s)	Tero Pitkämäki	Finland	84.18 m	4	SB
2nd place, silver medalist(s)	Julius Yego	Kenya	84.17 m	2	SB
3rd place, bronze medalist(s)	Vítězslav Veselý	Czech Republic	83.53 m	1	
4	Antti Ruuskanen	Finland	82.56 m		
5	Thomas Röhler	Germany	81.41 m		
6	Kim Amb	Sweden	80.78 m		
7	Ihab Abdelrahman	Egypt	80.06 m		
8	Ari Mannio	Finland	78.45 m		
9	Dmitry Tarabin	Russia	77.34 m		
10	Ivan Zaytsev	Uzbekistan	76.87 m		
11	Andreas Thorkildsen	Norway	72.70 m		

=== Women's ===
200 metres
Rank	Athlete	Nation	Time	Points	Notes
1st place, gold medalist(s)	Allyson Felix	United States	22.73	4	
2nd place, silver medalist(s)	Jodie Williams	Great Britain	22.97	2	
3rd place, bronze medalist(s)	Myriam Soumaré	France	22.98	1	
4	Jeneba Tarmoh	United States	22.98		
5	Murielle Ahouré-Demps	Ivory Coast	22.99		
6	Ivet Lalova-Collio	Bulgaria	23.20		SB
7	Barbara Pierre	United States	23.67		
8	Irene Ekelund	Sweden	23.74		
			Wind: (−0.6 m/s)		

400 metres
Rank	Athlete	Nation	Time	Points	Notes
1st place, gold medalist(s)	Novlene Williams-Mills	Jamaica	50.06	4	SB
2nd place, silver medalist(s)	Natasha Hastings	United States	50.60	2	SB
3rd place, bronze medalist(s)	Amantle Montsho	Botswana	51.05	1	
4	Libania Grenot	Italy	51.79		SB
5	Patricia Hall	Jamaica	52.00		
6	Marie Gayot	France	52.30		
7	Emily Diamond	Great Britain	52.58		
8	Line Kloster	Norway	53.62		

800 metres
Rank	Athlete	Nation	Time	Points	Notes
1st place, gold medalist(s)	Eunice Sum	Kenya	1:59.02	4	SB
2nd place, silver medalist(s)	Ajeé Wilson	United States	1:59.68	2	SB
3rd place, bronze medalist(s)	Jessica Warner-Judd	Great Britain	1:59.77	1	PB
4	Janeth Jepkosgei	Kenya	2:00.20		SB
5	Angelika Cichocka	Poland	2:00.43		
6	Molly Ludlow	United States	2:00.79		
7	Agatha Jeruto	Kenya	2:00.95		PB
8	Melissa Bishop-Nriagu	Canada	2:01.06		
9	Ingvill Måkestad Bovim	Norway	2:02.23		
10	Brenda Martinez	United States	2:02.27		
11	Malika Akkaoui	Morocco	2:02.33		
12	Caster Semenya	South Africa	2:03.68		
—	Selma Kajan	Australia	DNF		PM

400 metres hurdles
Rank	Athlete	Nation	Time	Points	Notes
1st place, gold medalist(s)	Kaliese Spencer	Jamaica	54.94	4	
2nd place, silver medalist(s)	Kemi Adekoya	Bahrain	54.96	2	
3rd place, bronze medalist(s)	Eilidh Doyle	Great Britain	55.33	1	
4	Tiffany Williams	United States	55.61		
5	Shevon Nieto	Jamaica	56.71		
~~6~~	~~Hanna Titimets~~	~~Ukraine~~	~~56.89~~		DQ (Note: Due to irregularities in her athlete biological passport Titimets' results from this competition were disqualified.)
~~7~~	~~Natalya Antyukh~~	~~Russia~~	~~58.06~~		DQ (Note: Due to doping violations Antyukh's results from this competition were disqualified.)

High jump
Rank	Athlete	Nation	Height	Points	Notes
1st place, gold medalist(s)	Mariya Lasitskene	Russia	1.98 m	4	=PB
2nd place, silver medalist(s)	Blanka Vlašić	Croatia	1.98 m	2	
3rd place, bronze medalist(s)	Ana Šimić	Croatia	1.95 m	1	
4	Anna Chicherova	Russia	1.90 m		
4	Irina Gordeeva	Russia	1.90 m		
4	Tonje Angelsen	Norway	1.90 m		
7	Justyna Kasprzycka	Poland	1.90 m		
8	Kamila Lićwinko	Poland	1.90 m		
9	Levern Spencer	Saint Lucia	1.85 m		

Long jump
Rank	Athlete	Nation	Distance	Points	Notes
1st place, gold medalist(s)	Tianna Bartoletta	United States	7.02 m (+0.1 m/s)	4	WL
2nd place, silver medalist(s)	Shara Proctor	Great Britain	6.78 m (+1.3 m/s)	2	SB
3rd place, bronze medalist(s)	Funmi Jimoh	United States	6.71 m (+0.5 m/s)	1	
4	Darya Klishina	Russia	6.67 m (−0.2 m/s)		
5	Ivana Španović	Serbia	6.67 m (+1.0 m/s)		
~~6~~	~~Olga Kucherenko~~	~~Russia~~	~~6.51 m (−0.7 m/s)~~		DQ (Note: Due to doping violations Kucherenko's results from this competition were disqualified.)
7	Erica Jarder	Sweden	6.44 m (+2.1 m/s)		
8	Sosthene Moguenara	Germany	6.37 m (+0.1 m/s)		
9	Janay DeLoach Soukup	United States	6.19 m (−1.2 m/s)		
Best wind-legal performances
	Erica Jarder	Sweden	6.31 m (+0.6 m/s)		

Discus throw
Rank	Athlete	Nation	Distance	Points	Notes
1st place, gold medalist(s)	Sandra Elkasević	Croatia	67.17 m	4	
2nd place, silver medalist(s)	Gia Lewis-Smallwood	United States	65.77 m	2	SB
3rd place, bronze medalist(s)	Denia Caballero	Cuba	64.89 m	1	SB
4	Yaime Pérez	Cuba	63.21 m		
5	Mélina Robert-Michon	France	63.08 m		
6	Nadine Müller	Germany	62.73 m		
7	Zinaida Sendriūtė	Lithuania	61.91 m		
8	Żaneta Glanc	Poland	59.31 m		
9	Grete Etholm	Norway	51.71 m		

== Promotional events results ==
=== Women's ===
200 metres
Rank	Athlete	Nation	Time	Notes
1st place, gold medalist(s)	Myriam Soumaré	France	11.18	SB
2nd place, silver medalist(s)	LaKeisha Lawson	United States	11.24	
3rd place, bronze medalist(s)	Muna Lee	United States	11.37	
4	Ezinne Okparaebo	Norway	11.40	
5	Asha Philip	Great Britain	11.41	
6	Jodie Williams	Great Britain	11.44	
7	Aleen Bailey	Jamaica	11.44	
8	Kateřina Čechová	Czech Republic	11.66	
			Wind: (−0.4 m/s)	

== National events results ==
=== Men's ===
100 metres
Rank	Athlete	Nation	Time	Notes
1st place, gold medalist(s)	Even Pettersen	Norway	10.56	PB
2nd place, silver medalist(s)	Kristoffer Buhagen	Norway	10.60	
3rd place, bronze medalist(s)	Amund Høie Sjursen	Norway	10.61	PB
4	David Sennung	Sweden	10.64	
5	Daniel Obeng	Great Britain	10.71	PB
6	Nickolai Jallow	Norway	10.73	
7	Michael Rosenberg	Norway	10.82	
8	Jostein Joshua Fossøy	Norway	10.82	
			Wind: (+1.6 m/s)	

200 metres
Rank	Athlete	Nation	Time	Notes
1st place, gold medalist(s)	Johan Wissman	Sweden	20.82	
2nd place, silver medalist(s)	Karsten Warholm	Norway	21.34	PB
3rd place, bronze medalist(s)	Jonathan Quarcoo	Norway	21.45	PB
4	Kjell Håkon Morken	Norway	21.60	PB
5	Nickolai Jallow	Norway	21.63	
6	Ousman Touray	Norway	21.64	PB
7	Even Meinseth	Norway	22.00	
8	Carl Emil Kåshagen	Norway	22.03	
			Wind: (−1.9 m/s)	

400 metres
Rank	Athlete	Nation	Time	Notes
1st place, gold medalist(s)	Nick Ekelund-Arenander	Denmark	46.02	SB
2nd place, silver medalist(s)	Andreas Roth	Norway	47.14	PB
3rd place, bronze medalist(s)	Felix Francois	Sweden	47.55	PB
4	Mauritz Kåshagen	Norway	48.04	SB
5	Sondre Nyvold Lid	Norway	48.36	
6	Martin Loftås Kåstad	Norway	48.48	SB
7	Jonas Grønnhaug	Norway	48.57	SB
8	Torbjörn Fossum Heldal	Norway	48.92	

800 metres
Rank	Athlete	Nation	Time	Notes
Heat 1
1st place, gold medalist(s)	Ville Lampinen	Finland	1:50.80	
2nd place, silver medalist(s)	Tuomo Salonen	Finland	1:51.35	
3rd place, bronze medalist(s)	Sigurd Blom Breivik	Norway	1:53.11	
4	Andreas Kramer	Sweden	1:53.30	
5	Markus Einan	Norway	1:53.56	
6	Abdurrahman Hir	Norway	1:53.67	
7	Haavard Olav Herness Lien	Norway	1:53.90	
8	Abduljaleel Mohamoud Ismail Hir	Norway	1:54.19	
9	Sondre Dingsør Skogen	Norway	1:55.31	
—	Albin Johansson	Sweden	DNF	
Heat 2
1st place, gold medalist(s)	Musaeb Abdulrahman Balla	Qatar	1:46.05	
2nd place, silver medalist(s)	Johan Rogestedt	Sweden	1:46.68	
3rd place, bronze medalist(s)	Thomas Roth	Norway	1:47.32	
4	Jan van den Broeck	Belgium	1:47.44	
5	Guy Learmonth	Great Britain	1:47.50	
6	Rickard Gunnarsson	Sweden	1:47.80	
7	Roald Frøskeland	Norway	1:48.35	
8	Håkon Mushom	Norway	1:48.37	
9	Mukhtar Mohammed	Great Britain	1:50.17	
10	Elias Ottosen	Norway	1:53.09	
—	Torbjörn Fossum Heldal	Norway	DNF	

1500 metres
Rank	Athlete	Nation	Time	Notes
1st place, gold medalist(s)	Jakub Holuša	Czech Republic	3:35.26	PB
2nd place, silver medalist(s)	Ryan Gregson	Australia	3:36.18	
3rd place, bronze medalist(s)	Andreas Vojta	Austria	3:36.43	
4	Jonas Glans	Sweden	3:39.37	PB
5	Andreas Bueno	Denmark	3:42.58	SB
6	Tom Farrell	Great Britain	3:42.79	
7	Vegard Vegard	Norway	3:43.18	
8	Senay Fissehatsion	Eritrea	3:44.00	
9	Erik Udø Pedersen	Norway	3:44.34	PB
10	Awet Nftalem Kibrab	Eritrea	3:46.37	
11	Vidar Dahle	Norway	3:48.64	SB
12	Gishe Abdi Wako	Ethiopia	3:50.08	PB
13	Johan Hydén	Sweden	3:50.48	
14	Lars Jonassen Føyen	Norway	3:56.55	
15	Anders Sørensen	Norway	4:15.34	
—	Filip Ingebrigtsen	Norway	DNF	
—	Reuben Bett	Kenya	DNF	
—	Erik Hovlandsdal	Norway	DNF	

400 metres hurdles
Rank	Athlete	Nation	Time	Notes
1st place, gold medalist(s)	Ashton Eaton	United States	49.16	
2nd place, silver medalist(s)	Johnny Dutch	United States	49.77	
3rd place, bronze medalist(s)	Rasmus Mägi	Estonia	49.88	
4	Yoann Décimus	France	49.93	SB
5	L. J. van Zyl	South Africa	50.45	
6	Silvio Schirrmeister	Germany	50.49	
7	Øyvind Strømmen Kjerpeset	Norway	51.50	
—	Rhys Williams	Great Britain	DQ	R 162.7

=== Women's ===
100 metres
Rank	Athlete	Nation	Time	Notes
1st place, gold medalist(s)	Alvilde Grønneberg	Norway	11.86	PB
2nd place, silver medalist(s)	Elisabeth Slettum	Norway	11.86	
3rd place, bronze medalist(s)	Marlén Aakre	Norway	12.03	
4	Mari Gilde Brubak	Norway	12.05	
5	Siv Sneen	Norway	12.05	SB
6	Ingvild Meinseth	Norway	12.06	PB
—	Helene Rønningen	Norway	DQ	R 162.7
—	Astrid Mangen Ingebrigtsen	Norway	DQ	R 162.7
			Wind: (+1.3 m/s)	

200 metres
Rank	Athlete	Nation	Time	Notes
1st place, gold medalist(s)	Hanna-Maari Latvala	Finland	23.67	
2nd place, silver medalist(s)	Elisabeth Slettum	Norway	24.04	
3rd place, bronze medalist(s)	Ida Bakke Hansen	Norway	24.29	PB
4	Christine Bjelland Jensen	Norway	24.50	SB
5	Alvilde Grønneberg	Norway	24.82	
6	Siv Sneen	Norway	25.01	
7	Helene Rønningen	Norway	25.03	
8	Madelen Andersen	Norway	25.04	SB
			Wind: (−1.1 m/s)	

400 metres
Rank	Athlete	Nation	Time	Notes
1st place, gold medalist(s)	Tara Marie Norum	Norway	53.70	
2nd place, silver medalist(s)	Trine Mjåland	Norway	54.26	
3rd place, bronze medalist(s)	Elin Moraiti	Sweden	54.56	
4	Benedicte Hauge	Norway	55.28	
5	Emily Rose Norum	Norway	55.32	SB
6	Sara Dorthea Jensen	Norway	56.02	PB
7	Vilde Lund Bjørnsen	Norway	57.42	

800 metres
Rank	Athlete	Nation	Time	Notes
1st place, gold medalist(s)	Anastasiya Tkachuk	Ukraine	2:02.17	
2nd place, silver medalist(s)	Zoe Buckman	Australia	2:02.28	
3rd place, bronze medalist(s)	Hedda Hynne	Norway	2:04.72	PB
4	Lovisa Lindh	Sweden	2:04.89	
5	Yngvild Elvemo	Norway	2:04.98	PB
6	Charlotte Schönbeck	Sweden	2:05.88	
7	Ida Fillingsnes	Norway	2:06.94	PB
8	Martine Eikemo Borge	Norway	2:08.46	SB
9	Mathilde Myhrvold	Norway	2:10.01	PB
10	Linn Söderholm	Sweden	2:10.23	PB
—	Emily Rose Norum	Norway	DNF	

1500 metres
Rank	Athlete	Nation	Time	Notes
1st place, gold medalist(s)	Charlotta Fougberg	Sweden	4:13.58	PB
2nd place, silver medalist(s)	Laura Crowe	Ireland	4:17.46	
3rd place, bronze medalist(s)	Kristine Eikrem Engeset	Norway	4:19.48	
4	Linn Nilsson	Sweden	4:19.57	
5	Amy Griffiths	Great Britain	4:19.95	
6	Maria Larsen	Denmark	4:21.45	
7	Viktoria Tegenfeldt	Sweden	4:21.75	
8	Kaisa Tyni	Finland	4:24.67	
9	Ingeborg Løvnes	Norway	4:26.22	
10	Elisabeth Angell Bergh	Norway	4:26.35	PB
11	Karoline Finne	Norway	4:27.82	PB
12	Rebecca Hammond	United States	4:29.50	SB
13	Aurora Dybedokken	Norway	4:30.75	
14	Christina Maria Toogood	Norway	4:30.84	
15	Karoline Egeland Skatteboe	Norway	4:34.55	
16	Irene Johansen	Norway	4:36.55	
—	Sofie Näslund	Sweden	DNF	

100 metres hurdles
Rank	Athlete	Nation	Time	Notes
1st place, gold medalist(s)	Hanna Plotitsyna	Ukraine	13.27	
2nd place, silver medalist(s)	Sarah Lavin	Ireland	13.60	
3rd place, bronze medalist(s)	Renate Grimstad	Norway	13.94	PB
4	Ida Bakke Hansen	Norway	14.23	
5	Sidsel Bjørgo Adam	Norway	14.36	
6	Marthe Berg	Norway	14.42	
7	Agathe Holtan Wathne	Norway	14.51	
8	Caroline Kuvaas	Norway	14.67	
			Wind: (−2.8 m/s)	

== See also ==
- 2014 Diamond League
