= Jamile Samuel =

Dutch sprinter (born 1992)

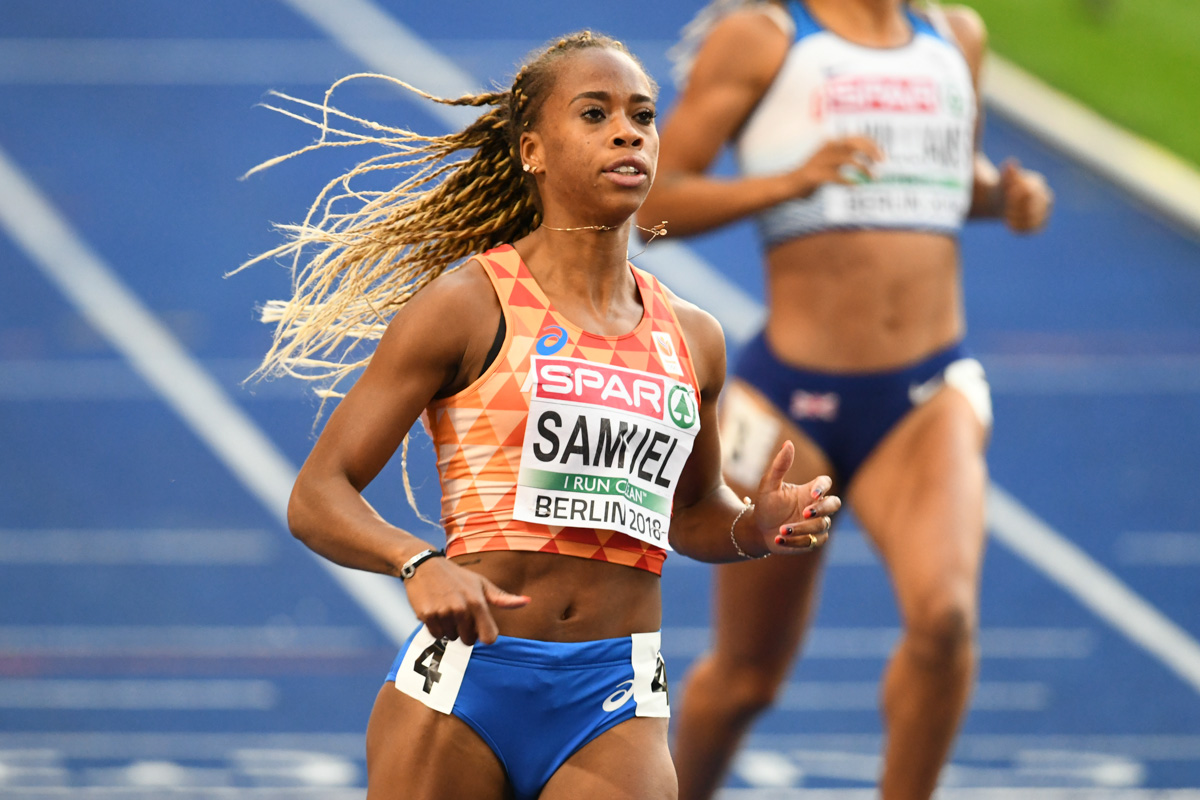
- Jamile Samuel in 2018

Personal information
- Nationality: Dutch
- Born: 24 April 1992 (age 34) Amsterdam, Netherlands
- Height: 1.68 m (5 ft 6 in)
- Weight: 59 kg (130 lb)

Sport
- Sport: Athletics
- Events: 100 metres, 200 metres

Achievements and titles
- Personal bests: 100 m: 11.12 s (1.0 m/s); 200 m: 22.37 s (0.2 m/s)
Medal record
Women's athletics
Representing the Netherlands
World Relays
Bronze medal – third place	2021 Chorzów	4 × 100 m relay
European Championships
Gold medal – first place	2016 Amsterdam	4 × 100 m relay
Silver medal – second place	2012 Helsinki	4 × 100 m relay
Silver medal – second place	2018 Berlin	4 × 100 m relay
Bronze medal – third place	2018 Berlin	200 m
European Indoor Championships
Bronze medal – third place	2021 Toruń	60 m
European Games
Gold medal – first place	2023 Kraków-Małopolska	4 × 100 m relay
World Junior Championships
Bronze medal – third place	2010 Moncton	100 m
Bronze medal – third place	2010 Moncton	200 m
Bronze medal – third place	2010 Moncton	4 × 100 m relay
European Junior Championships
Silver medal – second place	2011 Tallinn	100 m
Silver medal – second place	2011 Tallinn	200 m
Bronze medal – third place	2009 Novi Sad	4 × 100 m relay

Jamile Samuel (born 24 April 1992) is a Dutch athlete sprinter, who specialises in the 100 and 200 metres. She won three bronze medals at the 2010 World Junior Championships in Athletics, thus establishing herself as the third-fastest female runner under the age of 20 in the world. She won a gold medal with the Dutch women's 4 × 100 m relay team at the 2016 European Championships in Amsterdam.

== Career ==
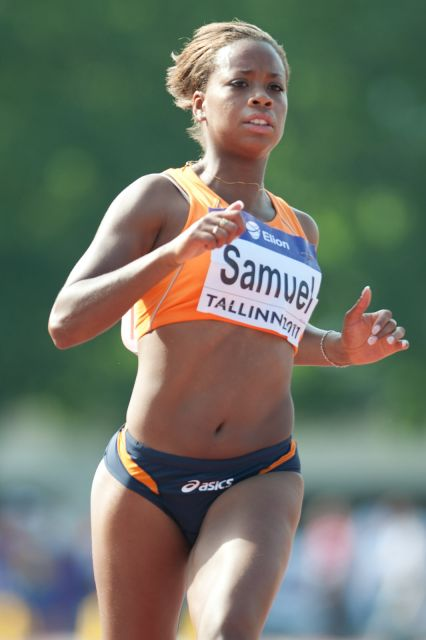
Samuel at the 2011 European Athletics Junior Championships in Tallinn

Jamile Samuel was born in Amsterdam in the Netherlands in a family with Surinamese roots. Her older brother Tjendo Samuel and younger sister Chanté also compete in athletics. She is a member of the Phanos athletics club based at the Olympic stadium in Amsterdam. She first came into the Dutch spotlight as a fifteen-year-old when challenging the record of four-time gold medalist at the 1948 Summer Olympics, Fanny Blankers-Koen. By the age of sixteen she was the 60 metres sprint champion in the Netherlands. She is the national champion in the 100 meters (2009 and 2017) and in the 200 meters (2011 and 2012).

At the 2010 World Junior Championships in Moncton (Canada), Jamile Samuel finished third in both the 100 meter and 200 meter sprints. With her teammates Dafne Schippers, Loreanne Kuhurima and Eva Lubbers she won a bronze in the 4 × 100 meters relay. One year later, at the 2011 European Athletics Junior Championships in Tallinn, Samuel finished behind British 100 and 200 meter sprints winner Jodie Williams, winning the silver medal in both cases.

At the 2012 European Athletics Championships in Helsinki (Finland), the Dutch 4 × 100 meters relay team (Kadene Vassell, Dafne Schippers, Eva Lubbers and anchored by Jamile Samuel), were second in 42.80, a national record, behind the German team. She finished 6th in the 200 meters final. At the subsequent 2012 Summer Olympics in London (United Kingdom), the team finished 6th in the 4 × 100 meters relay final in 42.70, a new national record.

She finished 6th in the 200 meters at the 2014 European Athletics Championships in Zurich (Switzerland) that was won by Dafne Schippers. The 4 × 100 meters relay team, one of the favorites for the title, did not finish in the final due to a botched first baton change.

At the 2015 World Championships in Athletics in Beijing (China), the Dutch 4 × 100 meters relay team (Nadine Visser, Dafne Schippers, Naomi Sedney and Jamile Samuel as the anchor) finished 5th in 42.32, but was disqualified for a changeover infringement. In the heats the team had also run 42.32, a new national record.

She was the start runner of the Dutch women's 4 × 100 m relay team led by Dafne Schippers, Tessa van Schagen and anchor runner Naomi Sedney that won the 4 × 100 meters relay at the European Championships in her home town Amsterdam with a national record of 42.04. She finished 4th in the 200 meters final in 22.83. She participated at the 2016 Summer Olympics in Rio de Janeiro (Brazil) where she was eliminated in the heats of the 200 meters. The relay team was also eliminated in the heats due to a botched relay handover between Samuel and Schippers.

At the 2018 European Championships, she won a silver as part of the Dutch women's 4 x 100 m relay team and an individual bronze in the 200 m. She also competed in the 100 m, finishing in 5th.

In 2021, she won bronze in the 60 m at the European Indoor Championships.

== Competition record ==
Year	Competition	Venue	Position	Event	Notes
Representing the Netherlands
2008	World Junior Championships	Bydgoszcz, Poland	6th	200 m	23.76
2009	European Junior Championships	Novi Sad, Serbia	3rd	4 × 100 m relay	45.88
2010	World Junior Championships	Moncton, Canada	3rd	100 m	11.56
2010	World Junior Championships	Moncton, Canada	3rd	200 m	23.27
2010	World Junior Championships	Moncton, Canada	3rd	4 × 100 m relay	44.09 (NJR)
2011	European Junior Championships	Tallinn, Estonia	2nd	100 m	11.43
2011	European Junior Championships	Tallinn, Estonia	2nd	200 m	23.31
2011	World Championships	Daegu, South Korea	9th (h)	4 × 100 m relay	43.44 (NR)
2012	European Championships	Helsinki, Finland	6th	200 m	23.55
2012	European Championships	Helsinki, Finland	2nd	4 × 100 m relay	42.80 (NR)
2012	Olympic Games	London, United Kingdom	6th	4 × 100 m relay	42.70 (NR)
2013	European U23 Championships	Tampere, Finland	4th	4 × 100 m relay	44.18
2013	World Championships	Moscow, Russia	13th	4 × 100 m relay	43.26
2014	European Championships	Zürich, Switzerland	6th	200 m	23.31
2014	European Championships	Zürich, Switzerland	3rd (h)	4 × 100 m relay	42.77
2015	European Indoor Championships	Prague, Czech Republic	7th	60 m	7.19
2015	World Championships	Beijing, China	–	4 × 100 m relay	DQ
2016	World Indoor Championships	Portland, United States	9th (sf)	60 m	7.16
2016	European Championships	Amsterdam, Netherlands	4th	200 m	22.83
2016	European Championships	Amsterdam, Netherlands	1st	4 × 100 m relay	42.04 (NR)
2016	Olympic Games	Rio de Janeiro, Brazil	9th (h)	4 × 100 m relay	42.88
2017	World Relays	Nassau, Bahamas	4th	4 × 100 m relay	43.11
2017	World Championships	London, United Kingdom	8th	4 × 100 m relay	43.07
2018	European Championships	Berlin, Germany	5th	100 m	11.14
2018	European Championships	Berlin, Germany	3rd	200 m	22.37
2018	European Championships	Berlin, Germany	2nd	4 × 100 m relay	42.15
2019	European Indoor Championships	Glasgow, United Kingdom	10th (sf)	60 m	7.31
2019	World Championships	Doha, Qatar	15th (sf)	200 m	23.02
2021	European Indoor Championships	Toruń, Poland	3rd	60 m	7.22
2021	World Relays	Chorzów, Poland	3rd	4 × 100 m relay	44.10
2022	European Championships	Munich, Germany	8th (sf)	200 m	23.13
2022	European Championships	Munich, Germany	5th	4 × 100 m relay	43.03
2023	World Championships	Budapest, Hungary	6th (h)	4 × 100 m relay	42.53

== Personal bests ==
Event	Time	Wind	Venue	Date
60 m	7.14	–	Berlin	13 February 2016
100 m	11.10 s	+0.3 m/s	Berlin	7 August 2018
200 m	22.37 s	+0.9 m/s	London	22 July 2018
