= Stormy Kendrick =

American sprinter

Personal information
- Nationality: American
- Born: January 6, 1991 (age 35)
- Height: 5 ft 3 in (160 cm)

Sport
- Sport: Running
- Event(s): 100 metres, 200 metres
- College team: Clemson Tigers
- Club: Gastonia Jaguars Track Club

Achievements and titles
- Personal best(s): 100m: 11.36 s (0.6 m/s); 200m: 22.99 s (-0.5 m/s)
Medal record
Women's athletics
Representing the United States
World Junior Championships
Gold medal – first place	2010 Moncton	200 m
Gold medal – first place	2010 Moncton	4×100 m relay

Stormy Kendrick (born January 6, 1991) is an American sprinter who specialises in the 100 and 200 metres. She won two gold medals at the 2010 World Junior Championships in Athletics.

== Career ==
At the 2010 World Junior Championships in Athletics, Kendrick won gold in the 200 metres in a personal best time of 22.99 s. Kendrick then combined with Takeia Pinckney, Dezerea Bryant, and Ashley Collier in the 4x100 metres relay to finish first ahead of Germany and the Netherlands.

== Personal bests ==
Event	Time	Wind	Venue	Date
100 m	11.36 s	0.6 m/s	Greensboro	May 28, 2010
200 m	22.99 s	-0.5 m/s	Moncton	July 23, 2010
