= Klaudia Konopko =

Polish athlete

Personal information
- Born: 21 February 1992 (age 34) Białystok, Poland

Sport
- Sport: Track and field
- Event: 4 × 100 metres relay

Klaudia Konopko (born 21 February 1992) is a Polish sprinter. She competed in the women's 4 × 100 metres relay event at the 2016 Summer Olympics.
