= Michaela Kargbo =

Sierra Leonean sprinter

Michaela Kargbo (born July 5, 1991) is a track and field sprint athlete who competes internationally for Sierra Leone.

Kargbo represented Sierra Leone at the 2008 Summer Olympics in Beijing. She competed at the 100 metres sprint and placed seventh in her heat without advancing to the second round. She ran the distance in a time of 12.54 seconds.
