= Eva Lubbers =

Dutch athletics competitor (born 1992)

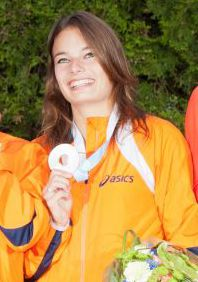

Personal information
- Full name: Eva Lubbers
- Born: 6 February 1992 (age 34) Uithoorn, Netherlands

Sport
- Country: Netherlands
- Sport: Athletics
- Events: Sprint, high jump

Achievements and titles
- Regional finals: 2nd at the 2012 European Athletics Championships

Eva Lubbers (Dutch: [ˈeːvaː ˈlʏbərs]; born 6 February 1992) is a Dutch athlete.

== Biography ==
She who competes in the sprint and high jump with a personal best time of 11.58 seconds at the 100 metres and 23.51 seconds at the 200 metres event.

Lubbers won the silver medal at the 2012 European Athletics Championships in Helsinki at the 4 × 100 m relay. She competed at part of the Dutch 4 × 100 m team at the 2012 Summer Olympics.
