= Hafsatu Kamara =

Sierra Leonean sprinter (born 1991)

Personal information
- Full name: Hafsatu Sahid Kamara
- Born: 7 December 1991 (age 34) Virginia, United States

Sport
- Sport: Athletics
- Event(s): 100 m, 200 m

Hafsatu Sahid Kamara (born 7 December 1991) is a Sierra Leonean sprinter. She competed in the 100 metres at the 2015 World Championships in Beijing without advancing from the first round.

She was born in the United States to Sierra Leonean parents and lived in Sierra Leone for some time during her childhood. Never having competed for the United States, she decided to represent her parents' country of origin when approached by that country's officials.

She competed for Sierra Leone at the 2016 Summer Olympics. She finished 8th in her heat for the 100 m and did not qualify for the semifinals. She was the flag bearer for Sierra Leone during the closing ceremony.

Kamara established the Sierra Leone Authority of American Football, serving as leader of the organisation when it was approved as a member of the International Federation of American Football (IFAF) in 2026.

== International competitions ==
Year	Competition	Venue	Position	Event	Notes
Representing Sierra Leone
2014	Commonwealth Games	Glasgow, Scotland	32nd (h)	100 m	12.14
2014	Commonwealth Games	Glasgow, Scotland	30th (h)	200 m	25.12
2015	World Championships	Beijing, China	45th (h)	100 m	12.13
2016	African Championships	Durban, South Africa	25th (h)	200 m	24.99
2016	Olympic Games	Rio de Janeiro, Brazil	59th (h)	100 m	12.22
2018	Commonwealth Games	Gold Coast, Australia	29th (h)	100 m	12.00
2018	Commonwealth Games	Gold Coast, Australia	26th (h)	200 m	24.50
2018	African Championships	Asaba, Nigeria	16th (h)	100 m	12.03
2018	African Championships	Asaba, Nigeria	17th (sf)	200 m	25.01
2024	African Games	Accra, Ghana	26th (h)	100 m	12.05

== Personal bests ==
Outdoor

- 100 metres – 11.61 (+0.2 m/s, Northridge 2013), (+1.8 m/s, Phoenix 2016)
- 200 metres – 23.83 (+1.1 m/s, Northridge 2013)
- 400 metres – 57.85 (Pasadena 2013)

Indoor

- 60 metres – 7.53 (Flagstaff 2017)
- 200 metres – 25.39 (New York 2014)
