= Orphée Neola =

French sprinter

Personal information
- Nationality: French
- Born: 1 February 1991 (age 34) Montfermeil, France

Sport
- Sport: Sprinting
- Event: 100 metres

Orphée Neola (born 1 February 1991) is a French sprinter. She competed in the women's 100 metres at the 2017 World Championships in Athletics.
