= 2017 European Athletics U23 Championships – Men's 400 metres =

The men's 400 metres event at the 2017 European Athletics U23 Championships was held in Bydgoszcz, Poland, at Zdzisław Krzyszkowiak Stadium on 13, 14 and 15 July.

== Medalists ==
Gold	Luka Janežič; Slovenia
Silver	Karsten Warholm; Norway
Bronze	Benjamin Lobo Vedel; Denmark

== Results ==
=== Heats ===
14 July

Qualification rule: First 3 (Q) and the next 4 fastest (q) qualified for the semifinals.

Rank	Heat	Name	Nationality	Time	Notes
1	1	Luka Janežič	Slovenia	46.44	Q
2	4	Karsten Warholm	Norway	46.70	Q
3	4	Maarten Stuivenberg	Netherlands	46.75	Q, =PB
4	1	Giuseppe Leonardi	Italy	46.76	Q
5	4	Kajetan Duszyński	Poland	46.80	Q
6	2	Daniele Corsa	Italy	46.82	Q
7	4	Gilles Biron	France	46.82	q
8	1	Dariusz Kowaluk	Poland	46.87	Q
9	1	Robert Parge	Romania	46.88	q, PB
10	4	Rokas Pacevičius	Lithuania	47.09	q, PB
11	3	Benjamin Lobo Vedel	Denmark	47.19	Q
12	2	Cameron Chalmers	Great Britain	47.25	Q
13	4	Andrew Mellon	Ireland	47.38	q
14	1	Michael Rossaert	Belgium	47.44	
15	3	Brayan Lopez	Italy	47.47	Q
16	1	Vincent Notz	Switzerland	47.47	
17	2	Darwin Andrés Echeverry	Spain	47.50	Q
18	3	Batuhan Altıntaş	Turkey	47.66	Q
19	1	Mateo Parlov	Croatia	47.63	
20	4	Zhivko Stoyanov	Bulgaria	47.65	
21	2	Luca Flück	Switzerland	47.79	
22	3	Harry Purcell	Ireland	48.04	
23	2	Konstadinos Koutsoukis	Greece	48.05	
24	3	Mario Gebhardt	Austria	48.13	
25	2	Gabrijel Stojanović	Croatia	48.17	
26	3	Mateo Kovačić	Croatia	48.22	
27	3	Cristian Radu	Romania	48.26	
28	2	Zeno Moraru	Romania	48.32	
29	3	Alexander Doom	Belgium	48.52	
30	2	Alessandro Gasperoni	San Marino	50.86	
31	1	Brandon Arrey	Ireland	53.00	

=== Semifinals ===
14 July

Qualification rule: First 3 (Q) and the next 2 fastest (q) qualified for the final.

Rank	Heat	Name	Nationality	Time	Notes
1	2	Luka Janežič	Slovenia	45.73	Q
2	2	Benjamin Lobo Vedel	Denmark	45.85	Q, NU23
3	2	Kajetan Duszyński	Poland	45.98	Q, PB
4	1	Karsten Warholm	Norway	46.06	Q
5	1	Daniele Corsa	Italy	46.20	Q
6	1	Cameron Chalmers	Great Britain	46.32	Q
7	2	Maarten Stuivenberg	Netherlands	46.33	q, PB
8	1	Darwin Andrés Echeverry	Spain	46.39	q, PB
9	2	Batuhan Altıntaş	Turkey	46.49	
10	2	Gilles Biron	France	46.56	
11	1	Giuseppe Leonardi	Italy	46.60	
12	1	Dariusz Kowaluk	Poland	46.74	
13	1	Rokas Pacevičius	Lithuania	46.93	PB
14	1	Robert Parge	Romania	47.06	
15	2	Brayan Lopez	Italy	47.23	
16	2	Andrew Mellon	Ireland	47.32	=SB

=== Final ===
15 July

Rank	Lane	Name	Nationality	Time	Notes
1st place, gold medalist(s)	6	Luka Janežič	Slovenia	45.33	
2nd place, silver medalist(s)	4	Karsten Warholm	Norway	45.75	
3rd place, bronze medalist(s)	7	Benjamin Lobo Vedel	Denmark	46.08	
4	8	Cameron Chalmers	Great Britain	46.29	
5	5	Daniele Corsa	Italy	46.51	
6	3	Maarten Stuivenberg	Netherlands	46.79	
7	9	Kajetan Duszyński	Poland	46.80	
8	2	Darwin Andrés Echeverry	Spain	46.92	
