= 2017 European Athletics U23 Championships – Men's 4 × 400 metres relay =

The men's 4 × 400 metres relay event at the 2017 European Athletics U23 Championships was held in Bydgoszcz, Poland, at the Zdzisław Krzyszkowiak Stadium on 15 and 16 July.

== Medalists ==
Gold	Silver	Bronze
Great Britain; Lee Thompson; Ben Snaith; Sam Hazel; Cameron Chalmers; Thomas Somers*	Poland; Wiktor Suwara; Przemysław Waściński; Kajetan Duszyński; Dariusz Kowaluk; Cezary Mirosław*; Łukasz Smolnicki*	France; Victor Coroller; Gilles Biron; Étienne Merville; Ludvy Vaillant; Adrien Coulibaly*; Hugo Houyez*

*Athletes who ran in heats only

== Results ==
=== Heats ===
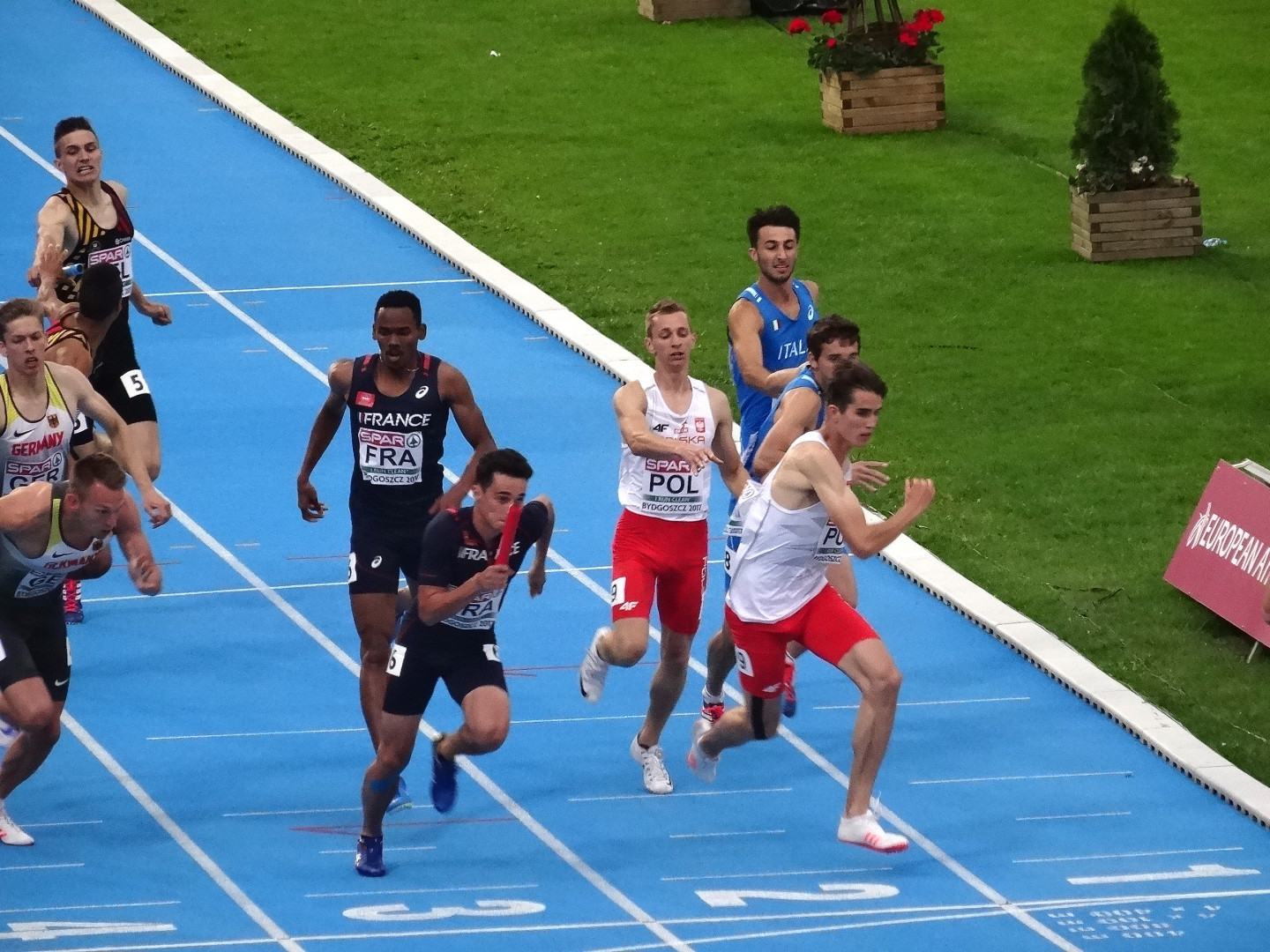
Second exchange

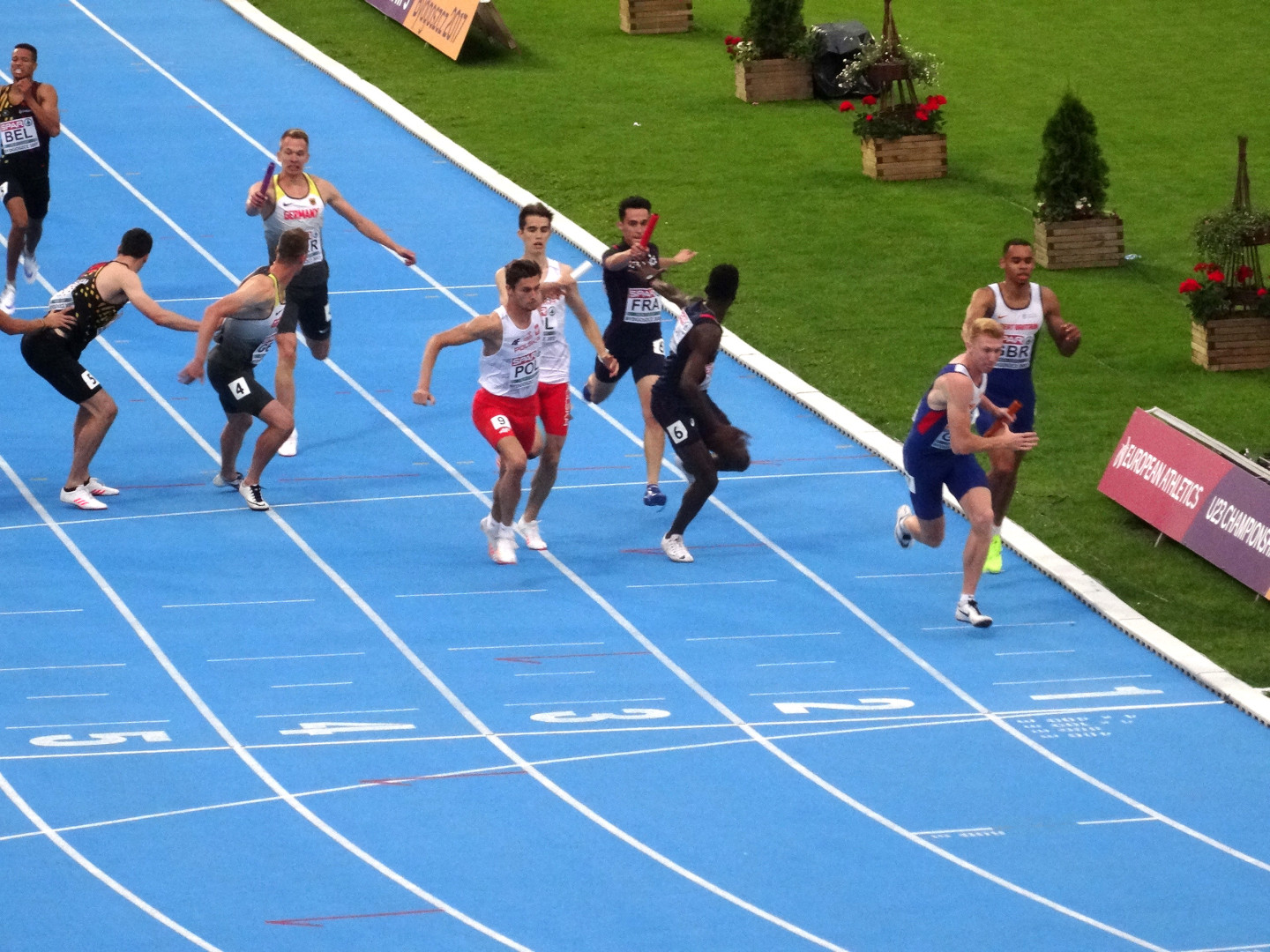
Third exchange

16 July

Qualification rule: First 3 in each heat (Q) and the next 2 fastest (q) qualified for the final.

Rank	Heat	Nation	Athletes	Time	Notes
1	1	Germany	Fabian Dammermann, Jakob Krempin, Florian Weeke, Constantin Schmidt	3:06.19	Q
2	1	Great Britain	Lee Thompson, Ben Snaith, Sam Hazel, Thomas Somers	3:06.20	Q
3	1	Italy	Alessandro Galati, Mattia Casarico, Brayan Lopez, Giuseppe Leonardi	3:07.05	Q
4	1	Ireland	Craig Newell, Harry Purcell, Karl Griffin, Andrew Mellon	3:07.63	q
5	2	France	Adrien Coulibaly, Gilles Biron, Hugo Houyez, Étienne Merville	3:08.49	Q
6	2	Belgium	Alexander Doom, Christian Iguacel, Asamti Badji, Michael Rossaert	3:08.59	Q
7	2	Poland	Cezary Mirosław, Przemysław Waściński, Łukasz Smolnicki, Wiktor Suwara	3:08.84	Q
8	2	Romania	Cristian Radu, Sebastian Mihai Ursachi, Zeno Moraru, Robert Parge	3:09.57	q
9	2	Turkey	Enis Ünsal, Abdullah Tütünci, Fahri Arsoy, Batuhan Altıntaş	3:10.14	
10	1	Czech Republic	Lukáš Hodboď, Martin Tuček, Matěj Mach, Jiří Kubeš	3:10.34	
11	1	Sweden	Alexander Lundskog, Andreas Carlsson, Dennis Forsman, Anton Sigurdsson	3:11.26	
	2	Switzerland	Vincent Notz, Luca Flück, Mattia Tajana, Joël Flury	DQ	R162.7, R125.5

=== Final ===
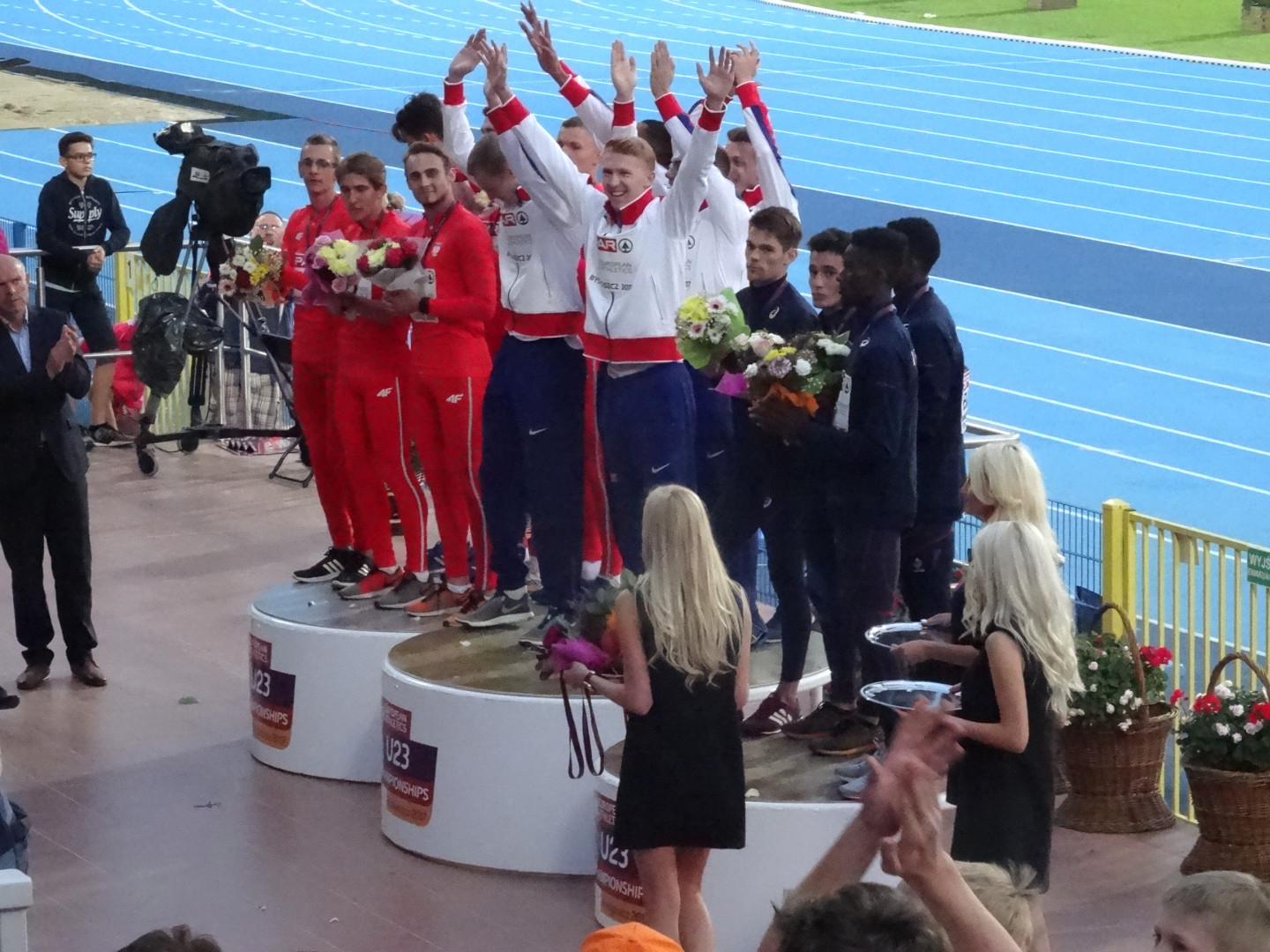
The podium

16 July

Rank	Nation	Athletes	Time	Notes
1st place, gold medalist(s)	Great Britain	Lee Thompson, Ben Snaith, Sam Hazel, Cameron Chalmers	3:03.65	
2nd place, silver medalist(s)	Poland	Wiktor Suwara, Przemysław Waściński, Kajetan Duszyński, Dariusz Kowaluk	3:04.22	
3rd place, bronze medalist(s)	France	Victor Coroller, Gilles Biron, Étienne Merville, Ludvy Vaillant	3:05.24	
4	Germany	Fabian Dammermann, Maximilian Grupen, Florian Weeke, Constantin Schmidt	3:05.65	
5	Belgium	Alexander Doom, Christian Iguacel, Asamti Badji, Michael Rossaert	3:06.45	
6	Italy	Giuseppe Leonardi, Mattia Casarico, Alessandro Galati, Daniele Corsa	3:07.20	
7	Ireland	Craig Newell, Harry Purcell, Karl Griffin, Andrew Mellon	3:08.64	
8	Romania	Cristian Radu, Cosmin Trofin, Zeno Moraru, Robert Parge	3:09.10	
