= Karsten Warholm =

Norwegian hurdler and sprinter (born 1996)

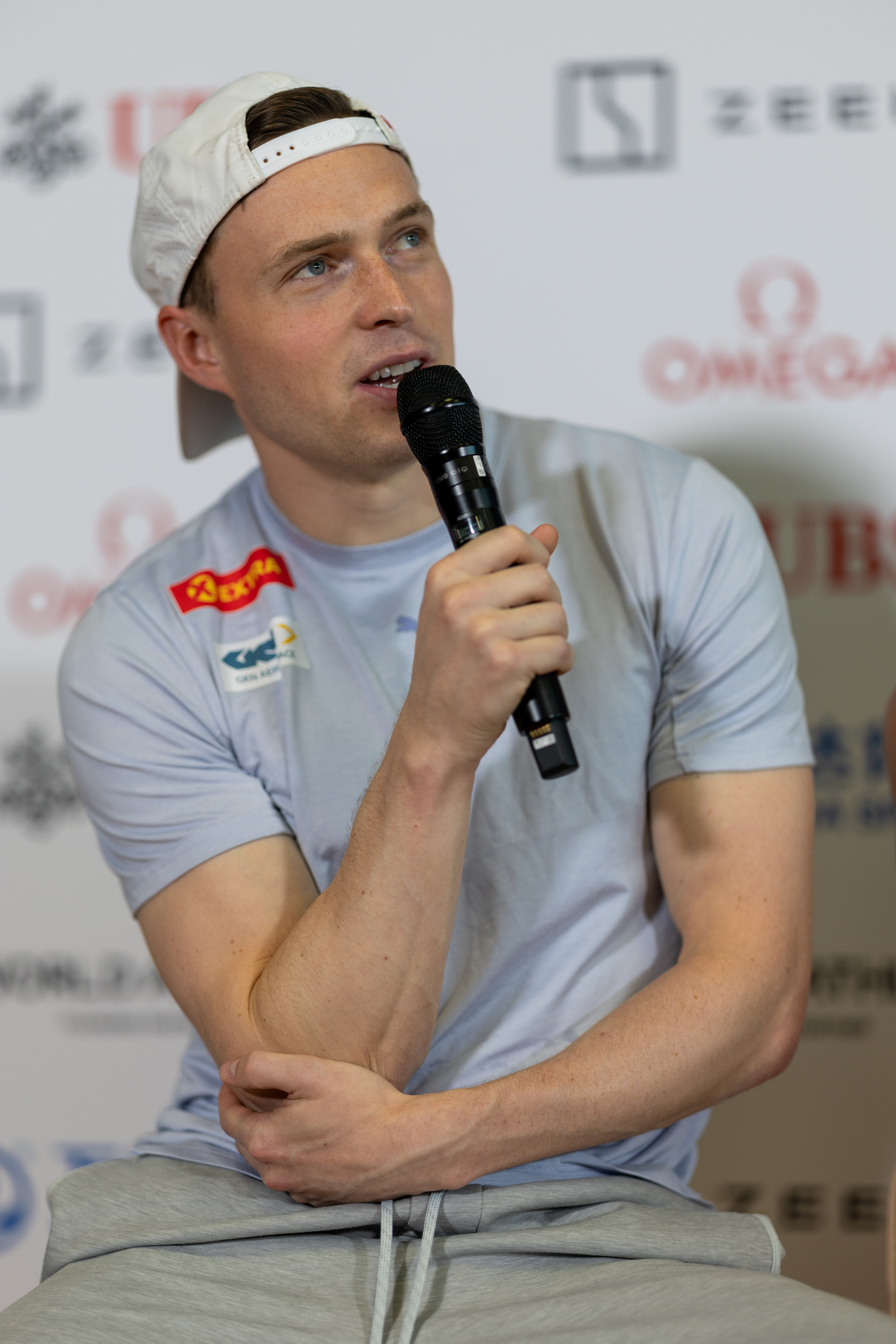
- Karsten Warholm at a Media Conference at the 2026 Wanda Diamond League’s Weltklasse Zürich athletics competition.

Personal information
- Born: 28 February 1996 (age 30) Ulsteinvik, Møre og Romsdal, Norway
- Height: 1.87 m (6 ft 2 in)
- Weight: 78 kg (172 lb)

Sport
- Country: Norway
- Sport: Athletics
- Events: Hurdling, sprinting
- Club: Dimna IL
- Coached by: Leif Olav Alnes

Achievements and titles
- Olympic finals: 2016 Rio de Janeiro; 400 m hurdles, 10th (sf); 2020 Tokyo; 400 m hurdles, Gold; 2024 Paris; 400 m hurdles, Silver
- World finals: 2017 London; 400 m hurdles, Gold; 2019 Doha; 400 m hurdles, Gold; 2023 Budapest; 400 m hurdles, Gold
- Highest world ranking: 1st (400 m hurdles, 2023)
- Personal bests: 100 m: 10.47 (Zurich 2024); 200 m: 21.09 (Florø 2016); 400 m: 44.87 (Florø 2017); 300 m hurdles: 32.67 WR (Oslo 2025); 400 m hurdles: 45.94 AR, OR (Tokyo 2021); Indoors; 200 m: 20.91i (Ulsteinvik 2017); 400 m: 45.05i =AR (Glasgow 2019)
Medal record
Men's athletics
Representing Norway
Olympic Games
Gold medal – first place	2020 Tokyo	400 m hurdles
Silver medal – second place	2024 Paris	400 m hurdles
World Championships
Gold medal – first place	2017 London	400 m hurdles
Gold medal – first place	2019 Doha	400 m hurdles
Gold medal – first place	2023 Budapest	400 m hurdles
World Ultimate Championship
Third place	2026 Budapest	400 m hurdles
World Indoor Championships
Silver medal – second place	2024 Glasgow	400 metres
Diamond League
First place	2019	400 m hurdles
First place	2021	400 m hurdles
First place	2025	400 m hurdles
European Championships
Gold medal – first place	2018 Berlin	400 m hurdles
Gold medal – first place	2022 Munich	400 m hurdles
Gold medal – first place	2024 Rome	400 m hurdles
Gold medal – first place	2026 Birmingham	400 m hurdles
Gold medal – first place	2026 Birmingham	4 × 400 m mixed
European Indoor Championships
Gold medal – first place	2019 Glasgow	400 m
Gold medal – first place	2023 Istanbul	400 m
European U23 Championships
Gold medal – first place	2017 Bydgoszcz	400 m hurdles
Silver medal – second place	2017 Bydgoszcz	400 m
European Junior Championships
Silver medal – second place	2015 Eskilstuna	400 m
Silver medal – second place	2015 Eskilstuna	Decathlon
World Youth Championships
Gold medal – first place	2013 Donetsk	Octathlon
Representing Europe
Continental Cup
Bronze medal – third place	2018 Ostrava	400 m hurdles

Karsten Warholm (Norwegian pronunciation: [ˈkɑʂtɛn ˈvɑ:rhɔ̂ɫm]; born 28 February 1996) is a Norwegian sprinter who competes in the 400 metres and 400 m hurdles. He is the 2020 Tokyo Olympic champion, silver medalist at the 2024 Paris Olympics, three-time world champion and former world record holder in the latter event.

Warholm has won gold for the 400 m hurdles at the World Athletics Championships in 2017, 2019 and 2023, as well as the 2018, 2022, 2024 European Athletics Championships and 2026 European Athletics Championships. He is the first athlete ever to win three 400 m hurdles events at the World Championships. Warholm is a three-time Diamond League 400 m hurdles champion. In 2021, he was voted World Athletics Male Athlete of the Year.

In July 2021, Warholm broke the 29-year-old world record in 400 m hurdles. The following month at the 2020 Tokyo Olympics, he won the gold medal in the 400 m hurdles with a time of 45.94 seconds, breaking his own world record by over three-quarters of a second.

== Career ==
=== Early career ===
In March 2013, Warholm won eight gold medals in the Norwegian Youth Indoors Championships. In June at the 2013 Bislett Games, he competed in the 200 metres, finishing seventh in his heat with a time of 22.25 s. Usain Bolt won a different heat at the same meet with a time of 19.79 s. At the 2013 World Youth Championships in July, he won gold in the boys' octathlon with 6451 points, a personal best.

In 2014, Warholm competed in the decathlon as well as in specialised events. At the time, his possible future specialization were the long jump, hurdling and 400 metres. His weakest performances in the decathlon were in the throwing events.

In June 2014, Warholm set a Norwegian junior record in the 400 m with a time of 46.31 s.

In July 2015, he won silver in the 400 m at the 2015 European Junior Championships with a time of 46.50 s, 0.02 s behind Benjamin Lobo Vedel. He also won silver in the decathlon with 7764 points, a personal best.

In July 2016, while participating in the semi-final of the 400 m hurdles at the 2016 European Championships, he broke the Norwegian national record with a time of 48.84 s. He then finished sixth in the final, with a time of 49.82 s. In August, he made it to the semi-finals in the 400 m hurdles at the 2016 Rio Olympics.

=== World championship title ===
In July 2017, Warholm won gold in the 400 m hurdles at the 2017 European U23 Championships, setting a championship record of 48.37 s. He also claimed silver in the 400 m with a time of 45.75 s. In August, he took gold in the 400 m hurdles at the 2017 World Championships with a time of 48.35 s. Two weeks after his success at the World Championships, he improved upon his own Norwegian record in the 400 m hurdles with a time of 48.22 s at the Weltklasse Zürich.

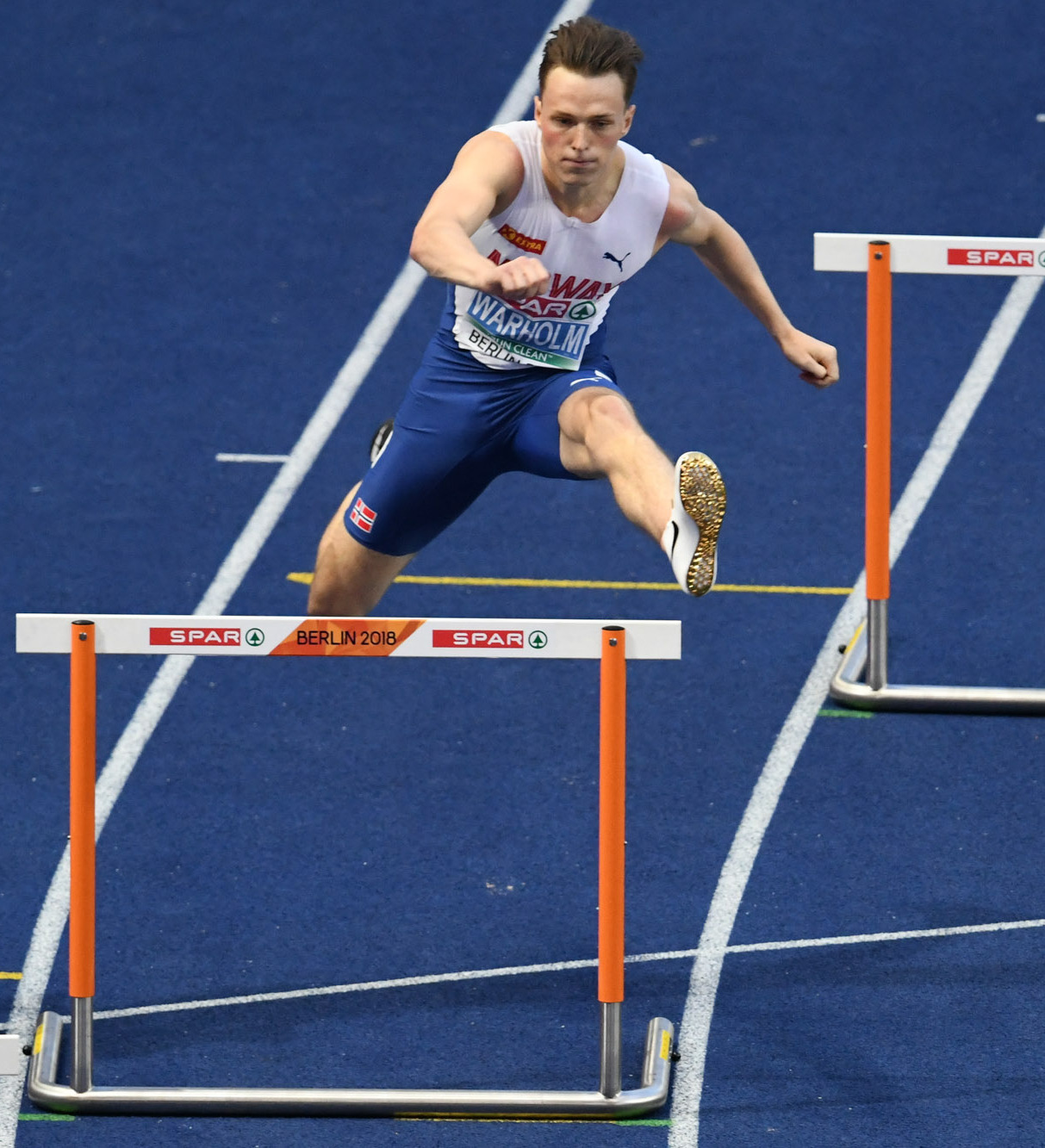
Warholm hurdles at the 2018 European Championships in Berlin.

At the 2018 European Championships Warholm won the gold medal in the 400 m hurdles event with a time of 47.64 s, setting his new personal best and the new European U23 record.

In March 2019, Warholm won gold in the 400 m at the 2019 European Athletics Indoor Championships. His time of 45.05 s equalled the European record set by Thomas Schönlebe in 1988. In June at the Bislett Games in Oslo, he broke the European men's 400 m hurdles record with a time of 47.33 s. At the Müller Anniversary Games in July, Warholm improved on his 400 m hurdles time, taking it to 47.12 s. At the Weltklasse Zürich in August, Warholm set a new European record in the event, with a time of 46.92 s, making him the third person to run under 47 seconds for the distance. He was chased to the finish line by Rai Benjamin, who became the fourth person to break 47 seconds, with a time of 46.98 s. At the 2019 World Athletics Championships in Doha, Qatar, he won the 400 m hurdles in a time of 47.42 seconds, retaining his championship title from 2017.

On 11 June 2020, Warholm competed in the Impossible Games in Bislett Stadium in Oslo. He ran the 300 metres hurdles with a world best time of 33.78 s, besting Chris Rawlinson's time of 34.48 s set in 2002. He also ran 400 m indoors with a time of 45.97 s. On 23 August in Stockholm, Warholm ran a personal best of 46.87 s, narrowly missing Kevin Young's world record of 46.78 s. With this performance, Warholm became the first person to break 47 seconds twice.

=== World records and Olympic title ===
On 1 July 2021, in his first race of the season at Bislett Stadium in Oslo, Warholm broke Kevin Young's 1992 world record with a time of 46.70 s.

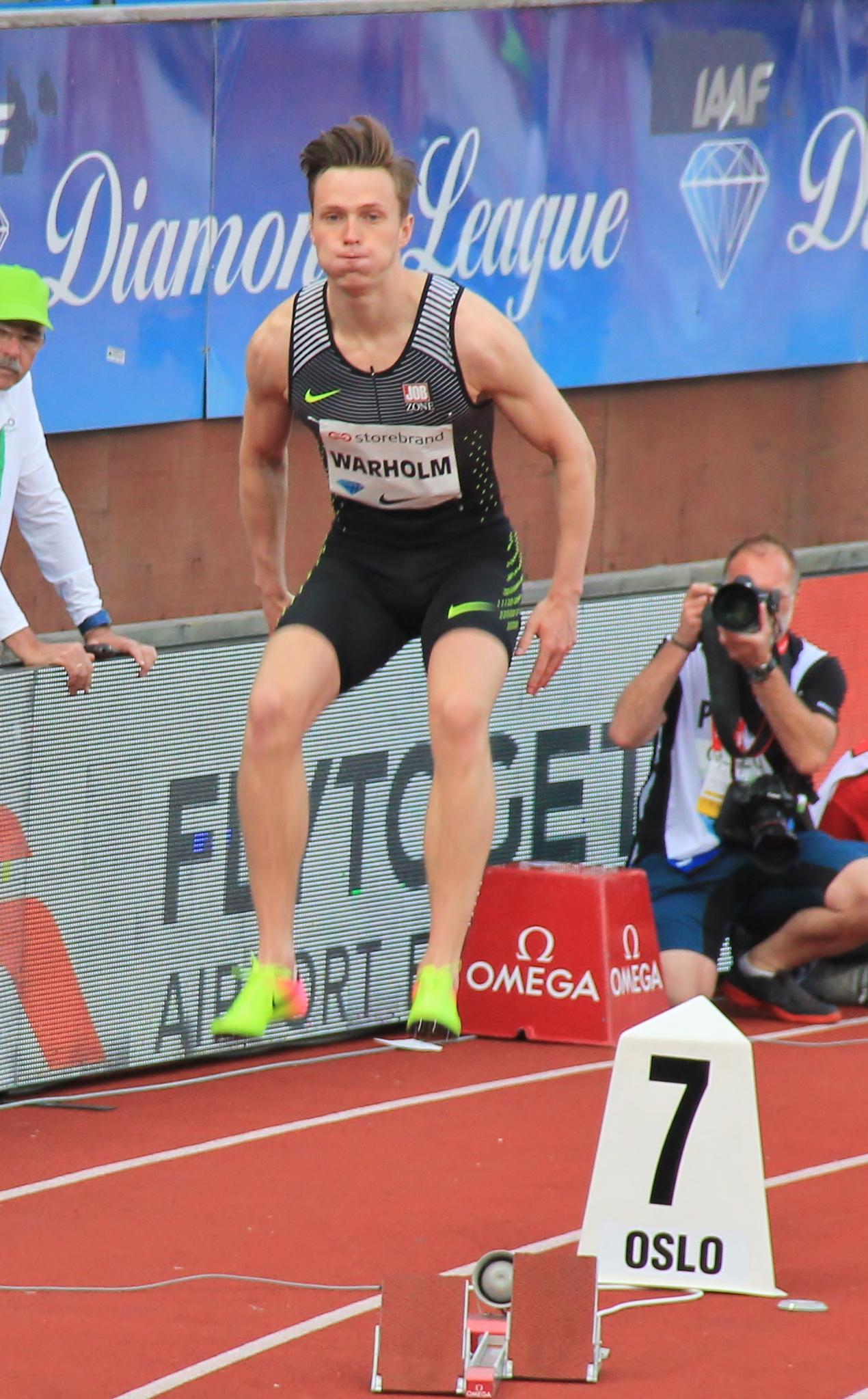
Warholm at the Bislett Games in Oslo in 2017

Warholm later broke his own record by 0.76 seconds at the postponed 2020 Tokyo Olympics, winning gold in a new world record of 45.94 s, an enormous 1.63% improvement on the previous record – the previous improvement of that magnitude was either David Hemery's 0.82 s improvement to 48.12 s in 1968 (1.68%, using fully automatic time), or Glenn Davis's 0.9 s improvement to 49.5 s in 1956 (1.79%, by official records including hand timing by the rules in place at the time). Warholm became the first European to win the event since Volker Beck in 1980. Warholm's time, the first sub-46 s time for the 400 m hurdles, was faster than 18 runners in the men's 400 m without hurdles.

The silver medalist in the final, Rai Benjamin, also beat the old record, with a time of 46.17 s; the bronze medalist, Alison dos Santos, was 0.02 seconds short of the old world record with a time of 46.72 s, but joined the other two in bettering the old Olympic record of 46.78 s. Warholm broke the old record without using the new "super spikes" worn by many of his competitors; he has criticized those spikes as "bullshit".

== "Karsten vs. Mondo" ==
On 4 September 2024, ahead of the Zurich Diamond League, Warholm competed in an exhibition 100 m event against pole vault world record holder Armand "Mondo" Duplantis. Duplantis won in a new personal best of 10.37 seconds, while Warholm finished a tenth of a second behind at 10.47 seconds, also in a personal best time.

== Career statistics ==
- Information from World Athletics profile.

=== Personal bests ===
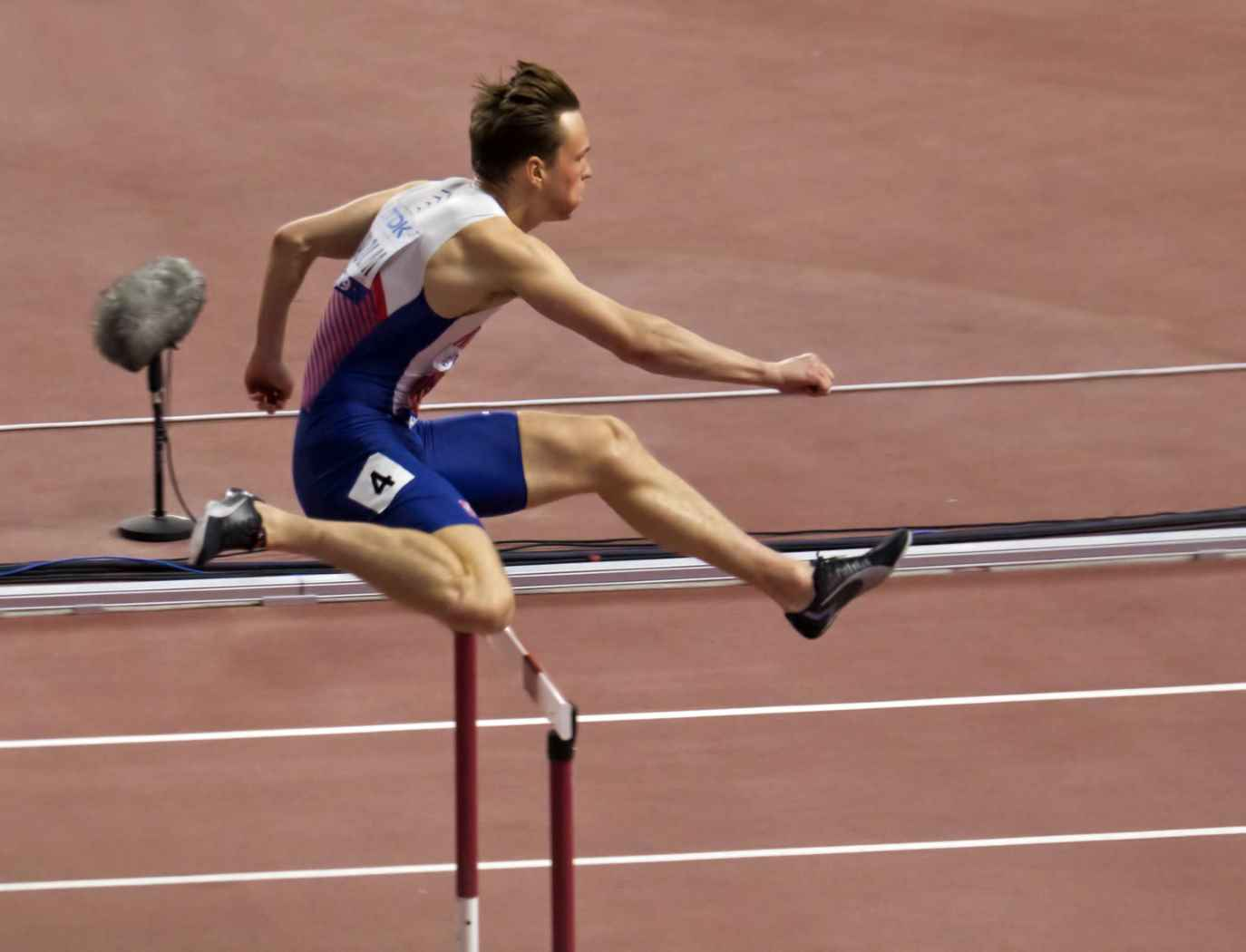
Karsten Warholm en route to his gold medal at the 2019 World Championships held in Doha

Surface	Event	Time	Date	Location	Notes
Outdoor	100 m	10.47	4 September 2024	Zurich	Exhibition race
Outdoor	200 m	21.09; 21.00 w	4 June 2016; 12 June 2015	Florø; Bærum	(wind-assisted)
Outdoor	300 m	32.49	22 August 2018	Bergen	NB
Outdoor	400 m	44.87	10 June 2017	Florø	NR
Outdoor	300 m hurdles	33.05	26 April 2025	Xiamen	World best
Outdoor	400 m hurdles	45.94	3 August 2021	Tokyo	European record, Olympic record
Indoor	60 m	6.75	28 January 2017	Florø	
Indoor	100 m	10.49	28 January 2017	Florø	
Indoor	200 m	20.91	5 February 2017	Ulsteinvik	
Indoor	400 m	45.05	2 March 2019	Glasgow	=European record
Indoor	300 m hurdles	34.26	10 February 2018	Tampere	OT WB

Event	Performance	Location	Date	Points
Decathlon	—N/a	Eskilstuna	18–19 July 2015	7,764 points
100 meters	10.54 (+0.7 m/s)	Lillestrøm	11 September 2015	966 points
Long jump	7.66 m (25 ft 1 1/2 in) (+1.5 m/s)	Eskilstuna	18 July 2015	975 points
Shot put	12.19 m (39 ft 11 3/4 in)	Eskilstuna	18 July 2015	618 points
High jump	2.05 m (6 ft 8 1/2 in)	Bergen	31 May 2014	850 points
400 meters	46.23	Oslo	11 June 2015	997 points
110 meters hurdles	14.05 (+1.6 m/s)	Gothenburg	29 June 2014	968 points
Discus throw	39.30 m (128 ft 11 in)	Eskilstuna	19 July 2015	650 points
Pole vault	4.30 m (14 ft 1 1/4 in)	Eskilstuna	19 July 2015	702 points
Javelin throw	45.82 m (150 ft 3 3/4 in)	Eskilstuna	19 July 2015	527 points
1500 meters	4:44.73	Eskilstuna	19 July 2015	651 points
Virtual Best Performance				7,904 points

=== International championship results ===
Representing Norway and Europe (Continental Cup only)
Year	Championship	Venue	Position	Event	Result	Notes
2013	World Youth Championships	Donetsk	1st	Octathlon	6451	
2013	World Youth Championships	Donetsk	15th	Medley relay	1:56.92	
2014	World Junior Championships	Eugene	10th	Decathlon	7551	
2014	World Junior Championships	Eugene	11th	4 × 100 m relay	40.62	
2014	European Championships	Zürich	31st	400 m	46.73	
2015	European Team Championships	Cheboksary	11th	4 × 400 m relay	3:10.65	
2015	European Junior Championships	Eskilstuna	2nd	400 m	46.50	
2015	European Junior Championships	Eskilstuna	2nd	Decathlon	7764	
2016	European Championships	Amsterdam	6th	400 m hurdles	49.82	
2016	European Championships	Amsterdam	16th	4 × 400 m relay	3:10.76	
2016	Olympic Games	Rio de Janeiro	10th	400 m hurdles	48.81	
2017	European U23 Championships	Bydgoszcz	2nd	400 m	45.75	
2017	European U23 Championships	Bydgoszcz	1st	400 m hurdles	48.37	
2017	World Championships	London	1st	400 m hurdles	48.35	
2018	European Championships	Berlin	1st	400 m hurdles	47.64	
2018	European Championships	Berlin	8th	400 m	46.68	
2018	Continental Cup	Ostrava	3rd	400 m hurdles	48.56	
2019	European Indoor Championships	Glasgow	1st	400 m	45.05	
2019	World Championships	Doha	1st	400 m hurdles	47.42	
2021	Olympic Games	Tokyo	1st	400 m hurdles	45.94	WR
2022	World Championships	Eugene	7th	400 m hurdles	48.42	
2022	European Championships	Munich	1st	400 m hurdles	47.12	CR
2023	European Indoor Championships	Istanbul	1st	400 m	45.35	
2023	World Championships	Budapest	1st	400 m hurdles	46.89	
2024	World Indoor Championships	Glasgow	2nd	400 m	45.34	
2024	European Championships	Rome	1st	400 m hurdles	46.98	CR
2024	Olympic Games	Paris	2nd	400 m hurdles	47.06	
2025	World Championships	Tokyo	5th	400 m hurdles	47.58	
2026	European Championships	Birmingham	1st	400 m hurdles	46.63	
2026	European Championships	Birmingham	1st	Mixed 4 × 400 m relay	3:09.62	CR, NR
2026	World Ultimate Championship	Budapest, Hungary	3rd	400 m hurdles	46.78	

=== Circuit wins and titles ===
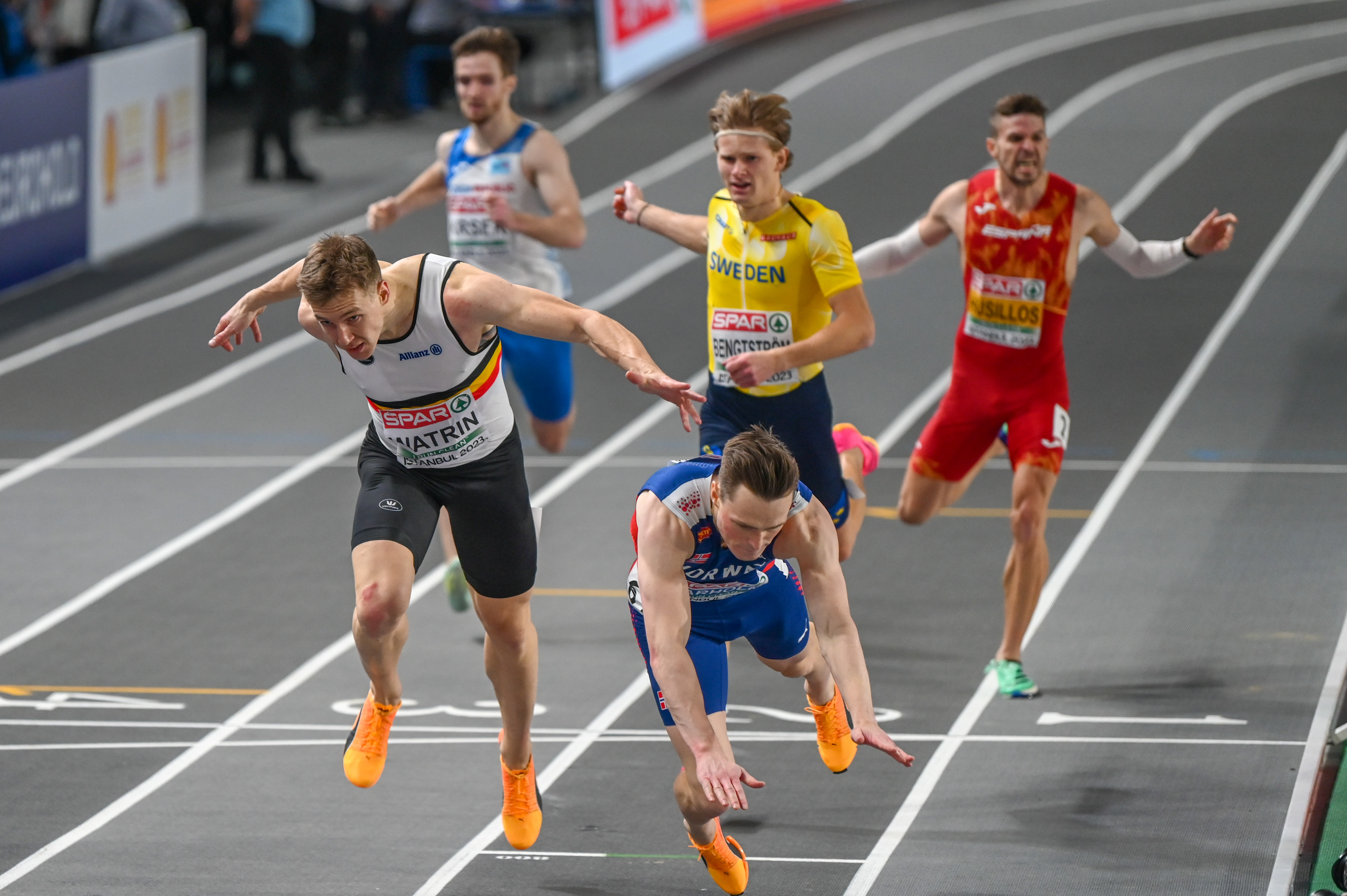
Warholm narrowly won the 400 m at the 2023 European Indoor Championships in Istanbul

- Diamond League champion 400 m hurdles (2): 2019 2021.

(400 m hurdles wins, other events specified in parentheses)

- 2017 (2): Oslo, Stockholm
- 2018 (1): London
- 2019 (5): Stockholm, Oslo, Paris, Zürich
- 2020 (4): Monaco (400 m & 400 m hurdles), Rome
- 2021 (3): Oslo, Monaco, Zürich
- 2023 (3): Oslo, Stockholm, Monaco
- 2025 (1): Xiamen (300 m hurdles)

- World Athletics Continental Tour

(400 m hurdles wins, other events specified in parentheses)

- 2020: Ostrava

=== National titles ===
- Norwegian Championships (15)
  - 110 m hurdles: 2013, 2014
  - 400 m: 2014, 2015, 2016, 2017, 2018, 2019
  - 400 m hurdles: 2015, 2016, 2017, 2018, 2019, 2020, 2023
- Norwegian Indoor Championships (11)
  - 60 m hurdles: 2014, 2015,
  - 200 m: 2015, 2016, 2017
  - 400 m: 2014, 2015, 2016, 2017, 2018
  - Long jump: 2016

== Personal life ==
Warholm was born in the town of Ulsteinvik on Norway's western coast.

He is in a relationship with Oda Djupvik. He enjoys fishing, cars, and building Lego.

Records
Preceded by (France) Stéphane Diagana	Men's 400 m Hurdles European Record Holder; 13 June 2019 –	Succeeded by Incumbent
Preceded by (United States) Kevin Young	Men's 400 m Hurdles World Record Holder; 1 July 2021 – 27 August 2026	Succeeded by (Brazil) Alison dos Santos
Awards and achievements
Preceded by (Germany) Max Heß	Men's European Athletics Rising Star of the Year; 2017	Succeeded by (Sweden) Armand Duplantis (Norway) Jakob Ingebrigtsen
Preceded by Ada Hegerberg; Jakob Ingebrigtsen	Norwegian Sportsperson of the Year; 2017; 2019	Succeeded by Jakob Ingebrigtsen; Erling Haaland
Preceded by (Kenya) Eliud Kipchoge	Men's Track & Field News Athlete of the Year; 2019	Succeeded by (Sweden) Armand Duplantis
