= Jan Doležal (decathlete) =

Czech athletics competitor

Jan Doležal in 2018

Jan Doležal (born 6 June 1996) is a Czech track and field athlete who competes in the decathlon. He represented his country at the IAAF World Indoor Championships in 2018.

Born in Třebechovice pod Orebem, he competed in athletics from a young age and was the bronze medallist at the 2013 World Youth Championships in Athletics in the octathlon. He moved up to the decathlon at the 2014 World Junior Championships in Athletics, then took a gold medal in that event at the 2015 European Athletics Junior Championships. He won his first senior national title in the men's heptathlon at the 2018 Czech Indoor Championships.

== International competitions ==
Year	Competition	Venue	Position	Event	Notes
2013	World Youth Championships	Donetsk, Ukraine	3rd	Octathlon	6222 pts
2014	World Junior Championships	Eugene, United States	16th	Decathlon	7309 pts
2015	European Junior Championships	Eskilstuna, Sweden	1st	Decathlon	7929 pts
2018	World Indoor Championships	Birmingham, United Kingdom	9th	Heptathlon	5775 pts
2018	European Championships	Berlin, Germany	8th	Decathlon	8067 pts

== National titles ==
- Czech Indoor Championships
  - Heptathlon: 2018
