= Darwin Echeverry =

Spanish sprinter (born 1996)

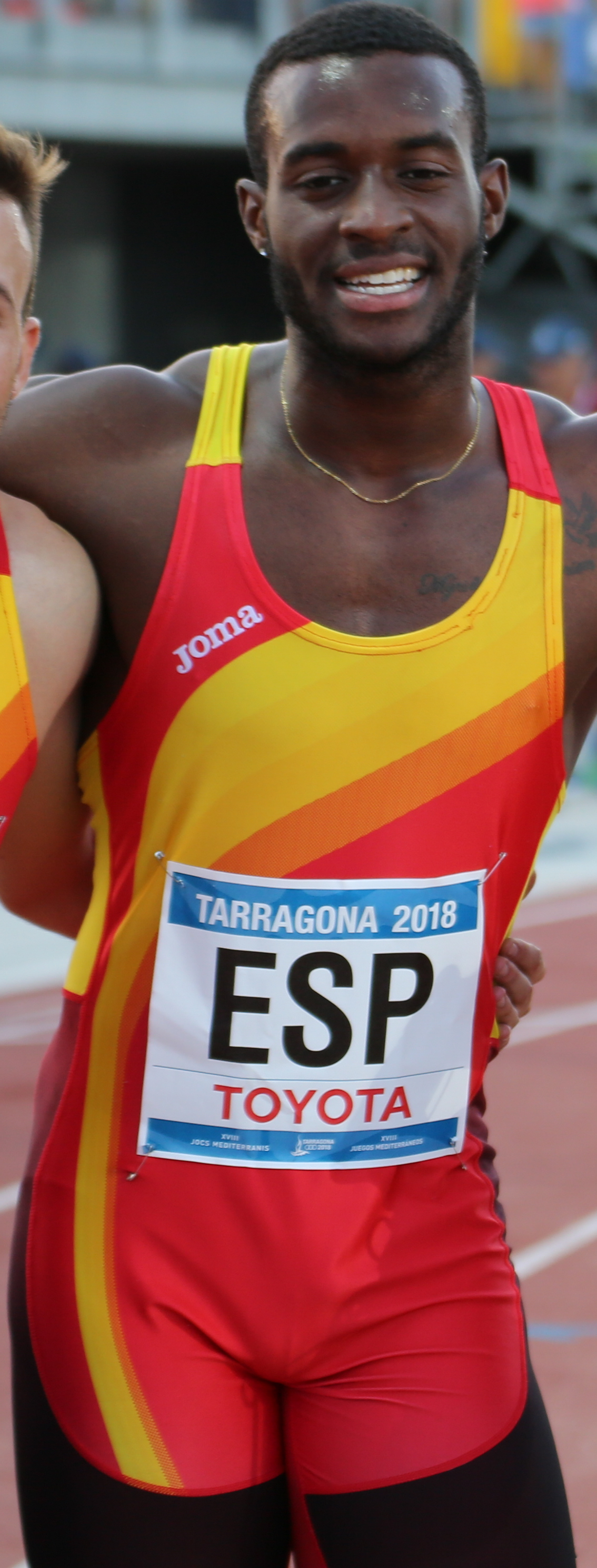

Personal information
- Full name: Darwin Andrés Echeverry Angulo
- Born: 2 January 1996 (age 30) Cali, Colombia
- Height: 1.89 m (6 ft 2 in)
- Weight: 79 kg (174 lb)

Sport
- Sport: Athletics
- Event: 400 metres
- Club: Tenerife CajaCanarias
- Coached by: Jorge Marín

Darwin Andrés Echeverry Angulo (born 2 January 1996) is a sprinter specialising in the 400 metres. Born in Colombia, he represented Spain in the 4 × 400 metres relay at the 2017 World Championships finishing fifth in the final in a new national record of 3:00.65.

His personal bests in the 400 metres are 46.23 seconds outdoors (Getafe 2018) and 46.61 seconds indoors (Salamanca 2017).

== International competitions ==
Year	Competition	Venue	Position	Event	Notes
Representing Spain
2013	World Youth Championships	Donetsk, Ukraine	47th (h)	400 m	49.54
2013	World Youth Championships	Donetsk, Ukraine	12th (h)	Medley relay	1:55.61
2015	European Junior Championships	Eskilstuna, Sweden	6th	400 m	47.47
2017	European U23 Championships	Bydgoszcz, Poland	8th	400 m	46.92
2017	World Championships	London, United Kingdom	5th	4 × 400 m relay	3:00.65 NR
2018	Mediterranean Games	Tarragona, Spain	8th	400 m	46.89
2018	Mediterranean Games	Tarragona, Spain	2nd	4 × 400 m relay	3:04.71
2018	European Championships	Berlin, Germany	3rd	4 × 400 m relay	3:04.62 (Note: Did not run the final; time from the heats.)
2019	European Team Championships	Bydgoszcz, Poland	4th	4 × 400 m relay	3:04.52 SB
2019	European Team Championships	Bydgoszcz, Poland	2nd	4 × 400 m mixed relay (Note: Non scoring event.)	3:20.47 NR
2019	World Championships	Doha, Qatar	14th (h)	4 × 400 m relay	3:04.27 SB
