= Dany Brand =

Swiss hurdler (born 1996)

Personal information
- Full name: Daniel Brand
- Born: 23 February 1996 (age 30) Hinwil, Switzerland
- Education: Swiss Federal Institute of Sport EHSM

Sport
- Country: Switzerland
- Sport: Athletics
- Event: 400 metres hurdles
- Club: Leichtathletik Club Zürich
- Coached by: Volker Beck (2022—); Flavio Zberg (2012—2022)

Achievements and titles
- Personal best: 400 m hurdles: 46.83 (Zürich 2022)
Medal record
Men's athletics
Representing Switzerland
European U23 Championships
Silver medal – second place	2017 Bydgoszcz	400 m hurdles

Dany Brand (born 23 February 1996, in Hinwil) is a Swiss athlete specialising in the 400 metres hurdles. He won a silver medal at the 2017 European U23 Championships in a new national U23 record.

His personal best in the event is 49.14 seconds set in Bydgoszcz in 2017. Brand improved his time to 46.83 in September 2023 during Weltklasse Zürich.

== Career ==
Dany Brand attributes his enthusiasm for athletics to his father, Juerg Brand, who used to be an athlete and now coaches him. Dany’s other coach is the German Olympic champion Volker Beck, who he began training with in November 2022. Brand changed from his previous coach of 10 years, Flavio Zberg.

=== 2014–2015 ===
Brand earned his first national title as a junior in the 400 metres hurdles at the Swiss Junior Championships in September 2014. He would claim the title again in August 2015.

=== 2022 ===
Days before he was supposed to compete in the 2022 World Championships in Eugene, he tested positive for COVID-19 and missed the event. He did not return until August for the 2022 European Championships, which were held in Munich. He came in sixth place during the preliminary trials, however, he did not advance to the semi-finals.

=== 2023 ===
The following year, he was selected to go to the 2023 World Championships in Budapest. He came in fifth place during the preliminary trials, however, he did not advance to the semi-finals.

== Achievements ==
Information from his World Athletics profile unless otherwise noted.

=== International competitions ===
Year	Competition	Venue	Position	Event	Time	Notes
Representing Switzerland
2014	World Junior Championships	Eugene, OR, United States	29th (h)	400 m hurdles	53.32	
2015	European Junior Championships	Eskilstuna, Sweden	5th	400 m hurdles	52.16	
2016	European Championships	Amsterdam, Netherlands	19th (h)	400 m hurdles	51.60	
2017	European U23 Championships	Bydgoszcz, Poland	2nd	400 m hurdles	49.14	NU23R PB
2017	Universiade	Taipei, Taiwan	7th	400 m hurdles	49.92	
2017	Universiade	Taipei, Taiwan	5th	4 × 400 m relay	3:09.94	
2018	European Championships	Berlin, Germany	14th (h)	400 m hurdles	50.82	SB
2019	Universiade	Naples, Italy	6th	400 m hurdles	49.83	SB
2019	European Team Championships Super League	Bydgoszcz Poland	8th	400 m hurdles	50.95	
2022	World Championships	Eugene, OR, United States	–	400 m hurdles	DNS	
2022	European Championships	Munich, Germany	13th (h)	400 m hurdles	50.30	
2023	European Team Championships First Division	Chorzów, Poland	6th	400 m hurdles	49.97	
2023	World Championships	Budapest, Hungary	30th (h)	400 m hurdles	49.69	
2024	European Championships	Rome, Italy	13th (h)	400 m hurdles	49.99	
2026	European Championships	Birmingham, United Kingdom	12th (sf)	400 m hurdles	48.96	
2026	European Championships	Birmingham, United Kingdom	8th	4 × 400 m relay	3:02.78	

=== National titles ===
- Swiss Championships
  - 400 m hurdles: 2020
- Swiss Junior Championships
  - 400 m hurdles: 2014

== See also ==
- List of Swiss records in athletics
