= 2013 World Youth Championships in Athletics – Boys' octathlon =

Boys' octathlon at the 2013 World Youth Championships in Athletics
- Venue: RSC Olimpiyskiy
- Dates: 10–11 July
- Competitors: 29
- Winning points: 6451 PB

Medalists
gold medal	Karsten Warholm	Norway
silver medal	Feliks Shestopalov	Russia
bronze medal	Jan Doležal	Czech Republic

The boys' octathlon at the 2013 World Youth Championships in Athletics was held on 10 and 11 July. The competition was won by the Norwegian athlete Karsten Warholm who like the other medalists set a new personal best in the event. His result was 40 points behind the world youth record.

== Medalists ==
Gold	Silver	Bronze
Karsten Warholm; Norway	Feliks Shestopalov; Russia	Jan Doležal; Czech Republic

== Records ==
Prior to the competition, the following records were as follows.

World Youth Best	Jake Stein (AUS)	6491	Lille, France	7 July 2011
Championship Record	Jake Stein (AUS)	6491	Lille, France	7 July 2011
World Youth Leading	Santiago Ford (CUB)	6392	La Habana, Cuba	10 May 2013

== Results ==
=== 100 metres ===
==== Heat 1 ====
Rank	Lane	Name	Nationality	Time	Notes	Points
1	4	Maksim Andraloits	Belarus	11.42	PB	769
2	2	Andrea Carioti	Italy	11.66	PB	719
3	5	Amir Boukhenfir	Algeria	11.67	PB	717
4	3	Maxim Issayev	Kazakhstan	11.67	PB	717
5	8	Simone Fassina	Italy	11.85		681
6	7	Maksym Klivtsur	Ukraine	11.85	PB	681
7	6	Lukas Reiter	Austria	12.09	PB	633

==== Heat 2 ====
Rank	Lane	Name	Nationality	Time	Notes	Points
1	2	Feliks Shestopalov	Russia	11.41	PB	771
2	6	Vinicius Fontenele	Brazil	11.46		761
3	7	John Lint	United States	11.58		736
4	5	Martin Paakspuu	Estonia	11.61	PB	730
5	4	Jorge Méndez	Spain	11.62		728
6	3	Luis Andrés Casarez	Mexico	11.67		717
7	8	Philipp Kronsteiner	Austria	11.76		699

==== Heat 3 ====
Rank	Lane	Name	Nationality	Time	Notes	Points
1	6	Gabriel Moore	United States	11.28	PB	799
2	8	Tobias Capiau	Belgium	11.45		763
3	4	Jan Doležal	Czech Republic	11.45		763
4	7	Andrey Fomichev	Russia	11.46		761
5	2	Edvaldo do Nascimento	Brazil	11.53		746
6	5	Carlos Sánchez	Spain	11.57		738
7	3	Dennis Hutterer	Germany	11.57		738

==== Heat 4 ====
Rank	Lane	Name	Nationality	Time	Notes	Points
1	2	Karsten Warholm	Norway	10.86	PB	892
2	8	Loek van Zevenbreggen	Netherlands	11.18		821
3	4	Artur Hämäläinen	Finland	11.33		789
4	3	Aleksandar Grnovic	Serbia	11.37		780
5	1	Suguru Shiozaki	Japan	11.39		776
6	6	Ben Thiele	Germany	11.47		759
7	5	Santiago Ford	Cuba	11.51		750
8	7	Sybren Blok	Netherlands	11.71		709

=== Long jump ===
Rank	Group	Name	Nationality	#1	#2	#3	Result	Notes	Points
1	A	Karsten Warholm	Norway	7.08	6.89	7.30	7.30	SB	886
2	A	Tobias Capiau	Belgium	7.12	7.11	6.87	7.12		842
3	A	Jan Doležal	Czech Republic	7.00	6.96	7.10	7.10		838
4	A	Maksim Andraloits	Belarus	7.07	7.00	6.74	7.07	PB	830
5	B	Loek van Zevenbreggen	Netherlands	7.04	—	—	7.04	PB	823
6	A	Edvaldo do Nascimento	Brazil	7.01	6.92	7.02	7.02	PB	818
7	B	Santiago Ford	Cuba	6.78	6.89	7.00	7.00		814
8	A	Ben Thiele	Germany	6.71	6.95	x	6.95		802
9	A	Vinicius Fontenele	Brazil	6.91	x	6.66	6.91		792
10	A	Gabriel Moore	United States	6.79	6.38	6.90	6.90	PB	790
11	B	Maxim Issayev	Kazakhstan	6.65	6.90	x	6.90	PB	790
12	B	Carlos Sánchez	Spain	6.84	6.89	6.87	6.89	PB	788
13	B	Feliks Shestopalov	Russia	6.89	x	6.81	6.89	PB	788
14	B	Andrey Fomichev	Russia	6.44	6.58	6.87	6.87	PB	783
15	A	Andrea Carioti	Italy	6.56	6.86	x	6.86	PB	781
16	A	Aleksandar Grnovic	Serbia	6.82	5.36	6.79	6.82		771
17	B	Martin Paakspuu	Estonia	6.75	6.70	6.81	6.81	PB	769
18	B	Artur Hämäläinen	Finland	x	6.69	6.79	6.79	PB	764
19	B	Jorge Méndez	Spain	x	6.72	x	6.72	PB	748
20	A	Simone Fassina	Italy	6.59	6.71	6.68	6.71	PB	746
21	A	Dennis Hutterer	Germany	6.70	6.14	4.57	6.70		743
22	A	Amir Boukhenfir	Algeria	6.65	6.52	6.34	6.65		732
23	A	John Lint	United States	6.59	6.56	6.52	6.59		718
24	A	Luis Andrés Casarez	Mexico	6.50	6.21	6.59	6.59	PB	718
25	B	Suguru Shiozaki	Japan	6.30	5.19	5.87	6.30		652
26	B	Maksym Klivtsur	Ukraine	x	6.26	5.99	6.26	PB	644
27	B	Philipp Kronsteiner	Austria	6.05	x	6.24	6.24		639
28	B	Lukas Reiter	Austria	6.18	6.19	x	6.19		628
	B	Sybren Blok	Netherlands	—	—	—	NM		0

=== Shot put ===
Rank	Group	Name	Nationality	#1	#2	#3	Result	Notes	Points
1	A	Ben Thiele	Germany	15.86	15.04	x	15.86	PB	843
2	A	Andrey Fomichev	Russia	15.01	14.90	14.11	15.01		790
3	B	Maksim Andraloits	Belarus	14.91	x	x	14.91		784
4	A	Aleksandar Grnovic	Serbia	13.86	14.50	14.12	14.50		759
5	B	Carlos Sánchez	Spain	12.93	14.05	13.87	14.05		731
6	B	Jan Doležal	Czech Republic	14.04	x	13.70	14.04		731
7	B	Artur Hämäläinen	Finland	12.52	13.46	13.91	13.91	PB	723
8	A	Lukas Reiter	Austria	13.56	13.39	13.83	13.83	PB	718
9	B	Jorge Méndez	Spain	11.89	13.82	13.65	13.82		717
10	A	Gabriel Moore	United States	13.63	13.54	13.60	13.63		706
11	A	Feliks Shestopalov	Russia	13.30	13.37	13.57	13.57	PB	702
12	A	Amir Boukhenfir	Algeria	13.47	13.16	12.53	13.47	PB	696
13	B	Tobias Capiau	Belgium	11.59	x	13.46	13.46		695
14	B	Santiago Ford	Cuba	11.41	13.24	x	13.24		682
15	A	Simone Fassina	Italy	13.07	x	13.13	13.13	PB	675
16	B	Edvaldo do Nascimento	Brazil	11.76	12.98	12.48	12.98	PB	666
17	B	Karsten Warholm	Norway	12.40	12.23	12.94	12.94	PB	664
18	A	John Lint	United States	11.95	12.87	12.78	12.87		659
19	B	Vinicius Fontenele	Brazil	11.14	11.70	12.80	12.80	PB	655
20	B	Martin Paakspuu	Estonia	12.68	12.31	12.79	12.79	PB	654
21	B	Loek van Zevenbreggen	Netherlands	11.84	11.73	12.58	12.58	PB	642
22	A	Luis Andrés Casarez	Mexico	11.96	11.94	11.96	11.96		604
23	A	Maksym Klivtsur	Ukraine	x	11.71	11.17	11.71		589
24	A	Andrea Carioti	Italy	11.69	11.45	11.07	11.69		588
25	A	Philipp Kronsteiner	Austria	11.10	11.32	—	11.32		565
26	A	Suguru Shiozaki	Japan	x	9.90	10.89	10.89	PB	539
27	B	Maxim Issayev	Kazakhstan	x	x	10.55	10.55	PB	519
	A	Dennis Hutterer	Germany				DNS		
	B	Sybren Blok	Netherlands				DNS		

=== 400 metres ===
==== Heat 1 ====
Rank	Lane	Name	Nationality	Time	Notes	Points
1	3	Artur Hämäläinen	Finland	49.56	PB	835
2	1	Martin Paakspuu	Estonia	51.82	PB	733
3	5	Maksym Klivtsur	Ukraine	52.53	PB	702
4	2	Lukas Reiter	Austria	53.11		677
5	7	Maxim Issayev	Kazakhstan	54.24	PB	630
	4	Dennis Hutterer	Germany	DNS		
	6	Sybren Blok	Netherlands	DNS		

==== Heat 2 ====
Rank	Lane	Name	Nationality	Time	Notes	Points
1	2	Edvaldo do Nascimento	Brazil	50.24	PB	804
2	5	Jan Doležal	Czech Republic	50.50	PB	792
3	3	Tobias Capiau	Belgium	51.14	PB	763
4	7	Andrey Fomichev	Russia	51.40	PB	751
5	6	Jorge Méndez	Spain	51.62	PB	741
6	4	Carlos Sánchez	Spain	51.89		730
7	1	Simone Fassina	Italy	52.39		708

==== Heat 3 ====
Rank	Lane	Name	Nationality	Time	Notes	Points
1	1	Aleksandar Grnovic	Serbia	50.05	PB	812
2	3	Maksim Andraloits	Belarus	50.66	PB	784
3	7	Ben Thiele	Germany	50.71		782
4	4	Loek van Zevenbreggen	Netherlands	51.10	PB	765
5	2	Vinicius Fontenele	Brazil	51.20		760
6	6	Amir Boukhenfir	Algeria	51.52		746
	5	Philipp Kronsteiner	Austria	DNS		

==== Heat 4 ====
Rank	Lane	Name	Nationality	Time	Notes	Points
1	4	Karsten Warholm	Norway	48.09	PB	905
2	5	Feliks Shestopalov	Russia	48.68	PB	876
3	8	Gabriel Moore	United States	49.60		833
4	1	John Lint	United States	49.66		830
5	2	Andrea Carioti	Italy	49.86	PB	821
6	6	Suguru Shiozaki	Japan	49.95	PB	817
7	3	Luis Andrés Casarez	Mexico	50.34	PB	799
8	7	Santiago Ford	Cuba	50.84		776

=== 110 metres hurdles ===
==== Heat 1 ====
Rank	Lane	Name	Nationality	Time	Notes	Points
1	4	Carlos Sánchez	Spain	14.21	PB	948
2	2	Suguru Shiozaki	Japan	14.39	PB	925
3	5	Andrea Carioti	Italy	14.92	PB	859
4	7	Maxim Issayev	Kazakhstan	15.09	PB	839
5	3	Tobias Capiau	Belgium	15.33	PB	810
6	6	Luis Andrés Casarez	Mexico	15.66		772

==== Heat 2 ====
Rank	Lane	Name	Nationality	Time	Notes	Points
1	2	Feliks Shestopalov	Russia	14.17	PB	953
2	6	Jan Doležal	Czech Republic	14.22	PB	946
3	7	Gabriel Moore	United States	14.74	PB	881
4	3	Martin Paakspuu	Estonia	14.93	PB	858
5	5	Maksym Klivtsur	Ukraine	15.26		818
6	8	Lukas Reiter	Austria	15.33		810
7	4	Loek van Zevenbreggen	Netherlands	15.47		794

==== Heat 3 ====
Rank	Lane	Name	Nationality	Time	Notes	Points
1	2	Maksim Andraloits	Belarus	14.39	PB	925
2	8	Jorge Méndez	Spain	14.49	PB	912
3	6	Aleksandar Grnovic	Serbia	14.55	PB	905
4	3	Andrey Fomichev	Russia	14.69		887
5	7	Artur Hämäläinen	Finland	14.96		854
6	5	Simone Fassina	Italy	15.05		843
	4	Philipp Kronsteiner	Austria	DNS		

==== Heat 4 ====
Rank	Lane	Name	Nationality	Time	Notes	Points
1	8	Karsten Warholm	Norway	13.86	PB	993
2	4	John Lint	United States	14.19	PB	950
3	5	Edvaldo do Nascimento	Brazil	14.32		934
4	3	Amir Boukhenfir	Algeria	14.47		915
5	7	Santiago Ford	Cuba	14.47		915
6	6	Ben Thiele	Germany	15.18		828
7	2	Vinicius Fontenele	Brazil	15.78		758

=== High jump ===
Rank	Group	Name	Nationality	1.45	1.48	1.51	1.54	1.57	1.60	1.63	1.66	1.69	1.72	1.75	1.78	1.81	1.84	1.87	1.90	1.93	1.96	1.99	2.02	2.05	2.08	Result	Notes	Points
1	B	Loek van Zevenbreggen	Netherlands	—	—	—	—	—	—	—	—	—	—	—	—	o	o	o	o	xo	o	o	xxo	o	xx—	2.05	PB	850
2	B	Santiago Ford	Cuba	—	—	—	—	—	—	—	—	—	—	—	—	o	—	xo	o	o	o	xxo	xxo	o	xxx	2.05	PB	850
3	A	Karsten Warholm	Norway	—	—	—	—	—	—	—	—	—	—	—	—	o	o	o	o	o	o	o	o	xxx		2.02	PB	822
4	B	Maksim Andraloits	Belarus	—	—	—	—	—	—	—	—	—	—	—	o	—	o	o	o	o	o	xxx				1.96	PB	767
5	B	Simone Fassina	Italy	—	—	—	—	—	—	—	—	o	o	—	o	o	o	o	xo	xo	o	xxx				1.96		767
6	B	Suguru Shiozaki	Japan	—	—	—	—	—	—	—	—	—	—	—	—	o	—	o	xo	xo	xo	xxx				1.96		767
7	A	Edvaldo do Nascimento	Brazil	—	—	—	—	—	—	—	—	—	—	—	—	o	o	xo	o	o	xxx					1.93		740
8	A	John Lint	United States	—	—	—	—	—	—	—	—	—	—	—	—	—	xo	xo	o	o	xxx					1.93		740
9	A	Feliks Shestopalov	Russia	—	—	—	—	—	—	—	—	—	—	o	xo	o	o	xxo	o	xxx						1.90		714
10	A	Andrey Fomichev	Russia	—	—	—	—	—	—	—	—	—	–	o	o	o	o	o	xo	xxx						1.90		714
11	B	Andrea Carioti	Italy	—	—	—	—	—	—	—	o	—	o	—	o	o	xo	o	xo	xxx						1.90		714
11	B	Artur Hämäläinen	Finland	—	—	—	—	—	—	—	—	—	—	—	xo	—	o	o	xo	xxx						1.90	PB	714
11	B	Jan Doležal	Czech Republic	—	—	—	—	—	—	—	—	—	–	o	o	xo	o	o	xo	xxx						1.90	PB	714
14	B	Jorge Méndez	Spain	—	—	—	—	—	—	—	—	—	–	o	—	o	xo	xo	xo	xxx						1.90		714
15	A	Gabriel Moore	United States	—	—	—	—	—	—	—	—	—	—	—	—	o	xo	xxo	xxx							1.87		687
16	B	Carlos Sánchez	Spain	—	—	—	—	—	—	—	o	—	–	o	o	o	o	xxx								1.84	PB	661
17	A	Martin Paakspuu	Estonia	—	—	—	—	—	—	—	—	—	o	o	o	o	xxx									1.81		636
18	A	Amir Boukhenfir	Algeria	—	—	—	—	—	—	o	—	—	o	xo	xo	o	xxx									1.81	PB	636
18	B	Lukas Reiter	Austria	—	—	—	—	—	o	—	—	o	—	o	xxo	o	xxx									1.81	PB	636
20	A	Ben Thiele	Germany	—	—	—	—	—	—	—	—	xo	o	o	o	xxx										1.78		610
21	B	Maxim Issayev	Kazakhstan	—	—	—	—	—	—	—	o	o	o	xxo	o	xxx										1.78	PB	610
22	A	Tobias Capiau	Belgium	—	—	—	—	—	—	—	—	o	o	xo	xxx											1.75		585
23	A	Luis André Casarez	Mexico	o	—	o	—	o	—	o	o	o	o	xxo	xxx											1.75		585
24	A	Aleksandar Grnovic	Serbia	—	—	—	—	—	—	—	o	xxx														1.66		512
24	A	Maksym Klivtsur	Ukraine	—	—	—	—	—	—	—	o	xxx														1.66		512
	A	Vinicius Fontenele	Brazil																							DNS		
	B	Philipp Kronsteiner	Austria																							DNS		

=== Javelin throw ===
Rank	Group	Name	Nationality	#1	#2	#3	Result	Notes	Points
1	A	Suguru Shiozaki	Japan	41.28	59.76	47.06	59.76	PB	734
2	B	Lukas Reiter	Austria	51.48	57.78	53.85	57.78	PB	704
3	B	Jan Doležal	Czech Republic	x	57.07	55.81	57.07	PB	694
4	B	Feliks Shestopalov	Russia	54.65	x	x	54.65	PB	658
5	B	Ben Thiele	Germany	x	54.09	53.62	54.09	PB	649
6	A	Martin Paakspuu	Estonia	49.88	48.29	53.60	53.60	PB	642
7	B	Aleksandar Grnović	Serbia	44.14	49.49	53.54	53.54	PB	641
8	B	Jorge Méndez	Spain	44.39	x	51.87	51.87	PB	616
9	B	Gabriel Moore	United States	x	39.15	51.81	51.81	PB	615
10	B	Artur Hämäläinen	Finland	44.01	51.40	47.31	51.40	PB	609
11	A	Andrea Carioti	Italy	50.72	48.91	49.68	50.72	PB	599
12	B	Amir Boukhenfir	Algeria	49.45	–	–	49.45		580
13	A	Maksim Andraloits	Belarus	x	43.80	49.20	49.20	PB	577
14	B	Luis Andrés Casarez	Mexico	31.64	47.00	44.34	47.00		544
15	A	Andrey Fomichev	Russia	x	42.72	45.02	45.02		515
16	A	Maksym Klivtsur	Ukraine	41.05	38.19	44.90	44.90	PB	514
17	B	Carlos Sánchez	Spain	43.62	39.36	x	43.62		495
18	A	Tobias Capiau	Belgium	x	x	43.02	43.02		486
19	A	Karsten Warholm	Norway	38.95	42.08	42.53	42.53		479
20	A	Edvaldo do Nascimento	Brazil	36.71	41.87	x	41.87		469
21	B	Santiago Ford	Cuba	41.37	x	x	41.37		462
22	A	Simone Fassina	Italy	39.63	39.28	40.85	40.85	PB	454
23	A	Loek van Zevenbreggen	Netherlands	x	40.79	x	40.79		454
24	A	John Lint	United States	33.02	33.61	37.25	37.25		402
25	A	Maxim Issayev	Kazakhstan	31.50	35.06	35.56	35.56	PB	378

=== 1000 metres ===
==== Heat 1 ====
Rank	Name	Nationality	Time	Notes	Points
1	Luis Andrés Casarez	Mexico	2:40.10		872
2	John Lint	United States	2:42.64		844
3	Andrea Carioti	Italy	2:48.00		787
4	Loek van Zevenbreggen	Netherlands	2:50.93	PB	756
5	Simone Fassina	Italy	2:51.57	PB	749
6	Lukas Reiter	Austria	2:52.21		743
7	Maksym Klivtsur	Ukraine	2:52.22	PB	742
8	Amir Boukhenfir	Algeria	2:52.39		741
9	Carlos Sánchez	Spain	2:52.44		740
10	Jorge Méndez	Spain	2:52.60	PB	739
11	Martin Paakspuu	Estonia	2:55.35	PB	711
12	Tobias Capiau	Belgium	3:03.23	PB	633
13	Maxim Issayev	Kazakhstan	3:10.56	PB	564

==== Heat 2 ====
Rank	Name	Nationality	Time	Notes	Points
1	Karsten Warholm	Norway	2:45.80	PB	810
2	Feliks Shestopalov	Russia	2:46.93		798
3	Artur Hämäläinen	Finland	2:48.15	PB	785
4	Suguru Shiozaki	Japan	2:49.35	PB	772
5	Santiago Ford	Cuba	2:50.83		757
6	Jan Doležal	Czech Republic	2:52.10	PB	744
7	Maksim Andraloits	Belarus	2:54.31	PB	721
8	Andrey Fomichev	Russia	2:55.76		706
9	Gabriel Moore	United States	2:56.18		702
10	Aleksandar Grnović	Serbia	2:59.57	PB	668
11	Ben Thiele	Germany	3:01.68	PB	648
12	Edvaldo do Nascimento	Brazil	3:10.41		566

== Final results ==
Rank	Name	Nationality	100m	LJ	SP	400m	110mh	HJ	JT	1000m	Points	Notes
1st place, gold medalist(s)	Karsten Warholm	Norway	892	886	664	905	993	822	479	810	6451	PB
2nd place, silver medalist(s)	Feliks Shestopalov	Russia	771	788	702	876	953	714	658	798	6260	PB
3rd place, bronze medalist(s)	Jan Doležal	Czech Republic	763	838	731	792	946	714	694	744	6222	PB
4	Maksim Andraloits	Belarus	769	830	784	784	925	767	577	721	6157	PB
5	Artur Hämäläinen	Finland	789	764	723	835	854	714	609	785	6073	PB
6	Gabriel Moore	United States	799	790	706	833	881	687	615	702	6013	
7	Santiago Ford	Cuba	750	814	682	776	915	850	462	757	6006	
8	Suguru Shiozaki	Japan	776	652	539	817	925	767	734	772	5982	PB
9	Ben Thiele	Germany	759	802	843	782	828	610	649	648	5921	PB
10	Jorge Méndez	Spain	728	748	717	741	912	714	616	739	5915	PB
11	Andrey Fomichev	Russia	761	783	790	751	887	714	515	706	5907	
12	Loek van Zevenbreggen	Netherlands	821	823	642	765	794	850	454	756	5905	PB
13	John Lint	United States	736	718	659	830	950	740	402	844	5879	
14	Andrea Carioti	Italy	719	781	588	821	859	714	599	787	5868	PB
15	Aleksandar Grnović	Serbia	780	771	759	812	905	512	641	668	5848	
16	Carlos Sánchez	Spain	738	788	731	730	948	661	495	740	5831	PB
17	Amir Boukhenfir	Algeria	717	732	696	746	915	636	580	741	5763	
18	Edvaldo do Nascimento	Brazil	746	818	666	804	934	740	469	566	5743	PB
19	Martin Paakspuu	Estonia	730	769	654	733	858	636	642	711	5733	PB
20	Simone Fassina	Italy	681	746	675	708	843	767	454	749	5623	
21	Luis Andrés Casarez	Mexico	717	718	604	799	772	585	544	872	5611	
22	Tobias Capiau	Belgium	763	842	695	763	810	585	486	633	5577	
23	Lukas Reiter	Austria	633	628	718	677	810	636	704	743	5549	
24	Maksym Klivtsur	Ukraine	681	644	589	702	818	512	514	742	5202	
25	Maxim Issayev	Kazakhstan	717	790	519	630	839	610	378	564	5047	
	Dennis Hutterer	Germany	738	743	0	0					DNF	
	Vinicius Fontenele	Brazil	761	792	655	760	758	0			DNF	
	Sybren Blok	Netherlands	709	0	0	0					DNF	
	Philipp Kronsteiner	Austria	699	639	565	0	0	0			DNF	
