= 2017 European Athletics U23 Championships – Men's 400 metres hurdles =

The men's 400 metres hurdles event at the 2017 European Athletics U23 Championships was held in Bydgoszcz, Poland, at Zdzisław Krzyszkowiak Stadium on 14, 15 and 16 July.

== Medalists ==
Gold	Karsten Warholm; Norway
Silver	Dany Brand; Switzerland
Bronze	Ludvy Vaillant; France

== Records ==
Prior to the competition, the records were as follows:

European U23 record	Harald Schmid (FRG)	47.85	Turin, Italy	4 August 1979
Championship U23 record	Marek Plawgo (POL)	48.45	Bydgoszcz, Poland	19 July 2003

== Results ==
=== Heats ===
14 July

Qualification rule: First 3 (Q) and the next 4 fastest (q) qualified for the semifinals.

Rank	Heat	Name	Nationality	Time	Notes
1	1	Ludvy Vaillant	France	50.38	Q
2	1	Jack Lawrie	Great Britain	50.40	Q
3	2	Dany Brand	Switzerland	50.45	Q, PB
4	4	Isak Andersson	Sweden	50.69	Q
5	3	Karsten Warholm	Norway	50.88	Q
6	1	Dylan Owusu	Belgium	50.97	Q
7	4	Jacob Paul	Great Britain	51.04	Q
8	3	Jonas Hanßen	Germany	51.06	Q
9	2	Victor Coroller	France	51.12	Q
10	1	Joachim Sandberg	Norway	51.19	q
11	1	Joshua Abuaku	Germany	51.33	q
12	4	Alain-Hervé Mfomkpa	Switzerland	51.45	Q
13	2	Dominik Hufnagl	Austria	51.48	Q
14	4	Javier Delgado	Spain	51.52	q
15	2	Vít Müller	Czech Republic	51.69	q
16	3	Martin Tuček	Czech Republic	51.79	Q
17	2	Alexander Lundskog	Sweden	51.88	
18	1	Diogo Mestre	Portugal	52.00	
19	4	Matěj Mach	Czech Republic	52.20	
20	3	Mattia Tajana	Switzerland	52.28	
21	4	Mateo Parlov	Croatia	52.60	
22	3	Enis Ünsal	Turkey	53.15	
23	2	Matteo Beria	Italy	53.16	
24	4	Andrea Ercolani Volta	San Marino	53.45	
25	3	Nikolay Nikolov	Bulgaria	53.53	
	3	Nick Smidt	Netherlands	DQ	R168.7

=== Semifinals ===
15 July

Qualification rule: First 3 (Q) and the next 2 fastest (q) qualified for the final.

Rank	Heat	Name	Nationality	Time	Notes
1	2	Karsten Warholm	Norway	49.29	Q
2	2	Victor Coroller	France	49.30	Q, PB
3	2	Dany Brand	Switzerland	49.37	Q, PB
4	1	Ludvy Vaillant	France	49.55	Q, PB
5	1	Jacob Paul	Great Britain	49.85	Q
6	1	Isak Andersson	Sweden	50.05	Q
7	1	Vít Müller	Czech Republic	50.37	q
8	2	Jack Lawrie	Great Britain	50.46	q
9	1	Jonas Hanßen	Germany	50.67	SB
10	1	Dominik Hufnagl	Austria	50.74	PB
11	2	Joshua Abuaku	Germany	50.79	PB
12	1	Alain-Hervé Mfomkpa	Switzerland	50.92	
13	1	Joachim Sandberg	Norway	51.12	
14	2	Martin Tuček	Czech Republic	51.64	
15	2	Dylan Owusu	Belgium	53.10	
	2	Javier Delgado	Spain	DQ	R168.7

=== Final ===
16 July

Rank	Lane	Name	Nationality	Time	Notes
1st place, gold medalist(s)	5	Karsten Warholm	Norway	48.37	CR
2nd place, silver medalist(s)	8	Dany Brand	Switzerland	49.14	NU23R
3rd place, bronze medalist(s)	4	Ludvy Vaillant	France	49.31	PB
4	6	Victor Coroller	France	49.96	
5	7	Jacob Paul	Great Britain	49.98	
6	9	Isak Andersson	Sweden	50.08	
7	2	Jack Lawrie	Great Britain	50.60	
8	3	Vít Müller	Czech Republic	50.63	
