= Dariusz Kowaluk =

Polish sprinter (born 1996)

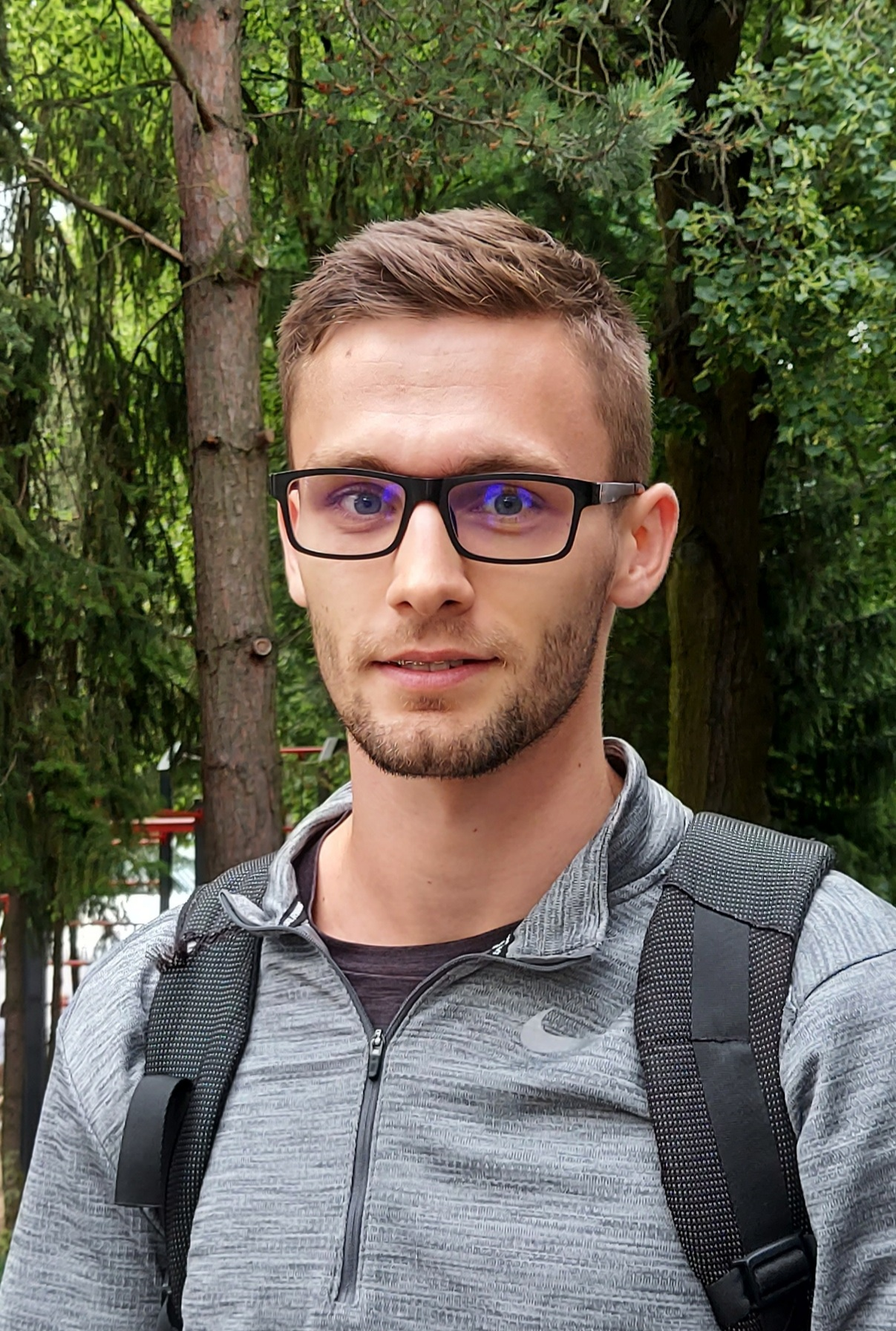
- Kowaluk in 2021

Personal information
- Born: 16 April 1996 (age 30) Włodawa, Poland
- Education: Cardinal Stefan Wyszyński University in Warsaw
- Height: 1.87 m (6 ft 2 in)
- Weight: 72 kg (159 lb)

Sport
- Sport: Athletics
- Event: 400 metres
- Club: MKS Żak Biała Podlaska; AZS-AWF Warszawa
- Coached by: Janusz Wilczek; Andrzej Wołkowycki
Medal record
Men's athletics
Representing Poland
Olympic Games
| Gold medal – first place | 2020 Tokyo | 4 × 400 m mixed |
Summer Universiade
| Bronze medal – third place | 2019 Naples | 4 × 400 m relay |
European Athletics U23 Championships
| Silver medal – second place | 2017 Bydgoszcz | 4 × 400 m relay |

Dariusz Kowaluk (born 16 April 1996) is a Polish sprinter specialising in the 400 metres. Kowaluk was born to Teresa and Miroslaw in Wlodawa in the Lublin region. He won a silver medal in the 4 × 400 metres relay at the 2017 European U23 Championships as well as gold in the mixed 4 × 400 metres relay at the 2020 Summer Olympic Games.

Kowaluk was a student of journalism at Cardinal Stefan Wyszński University in Warsaw. During his studies he was able to train between classes as his training ground was close to the university.

== International competitions ==
| Year | Competition | Venue | Position | Event | Notes |
Representing Poland
| 2015 | European Junior Championships | Eskilstuna, Sweden | 8th | 400 m | 47.90 |
| 2015 | European Junior Championships | Eskilstuna, Sweden | 4th | 4 × 400 m relay | 3:10.40 |
| 2017 | European U23 Championships | Bydgoszcz, Poland | 12th (sf) | 400 m | 46.74 |
| 2017 | European U23 Championships | Bydgoszcz, Poland | 2nd | 4 × 400 m relay | 3:04.22 |
| 2017 | Universiade | Taipei, Taiwan | – | 4 × 400 m relay | DNF |
| 2018 | World Cup | London, United Kingdom | 3rd | 4 × 400 m relay | 3:03.16 |
| 2018 | European Championships | Berlin, Germany | 15th (h) | 400 m | 46.18 |
| 2018 | European Championships | Berlin, Germany | 5th (h) | 4 × 400 m relay | 3:02.75 |
| 2019 | European Indoor Championships | Glasgow, United Kingdom | 4th | 4 × 400 m relay | 3:08.40 |
| 2019 | World Relays | Yokohama, Japan | 7th (B) | 4 × 400 m relay | 3:05.91 |
| 2019 | Universiade | Naples, Italy | 11th (sf) | 400 m | 46.77 |
| 2019 | Universiade | Naples, Italy | 3rd | 4 × 400 m relay | 3:03.35 |
| 2021 | World Relays | Chorzów, Poland | 9th (h) | 4 × 400 m relay | 3:05.04 |
| 2021 | Olympic Games | Tokyo, Japan | 5th | 4 × 400 m relay | 2:58.46 |
| 2021 | Olympic Games | Tokyo, Japan | 1st | 4 × 400 m mixed relay | 3:10.44 (Note: Time from the heats; Kowaluk was replaced in the final.) |

== Personal bests ==
Outdoor

- 100 metres – 10.57 (+1.1 m/s, Szczecin 2018)
- 200 metres – 20.95 (+0.8 m/s, Szczecin 2018)
- 400 metres – 46.06 (Lublin 2018)

Indoor

- 200 metres – 21.71 (Spała 2018)
- 400 metres – 46.95 (Toruń 2018)
