= Ludvy Vaillant =

French hurdler

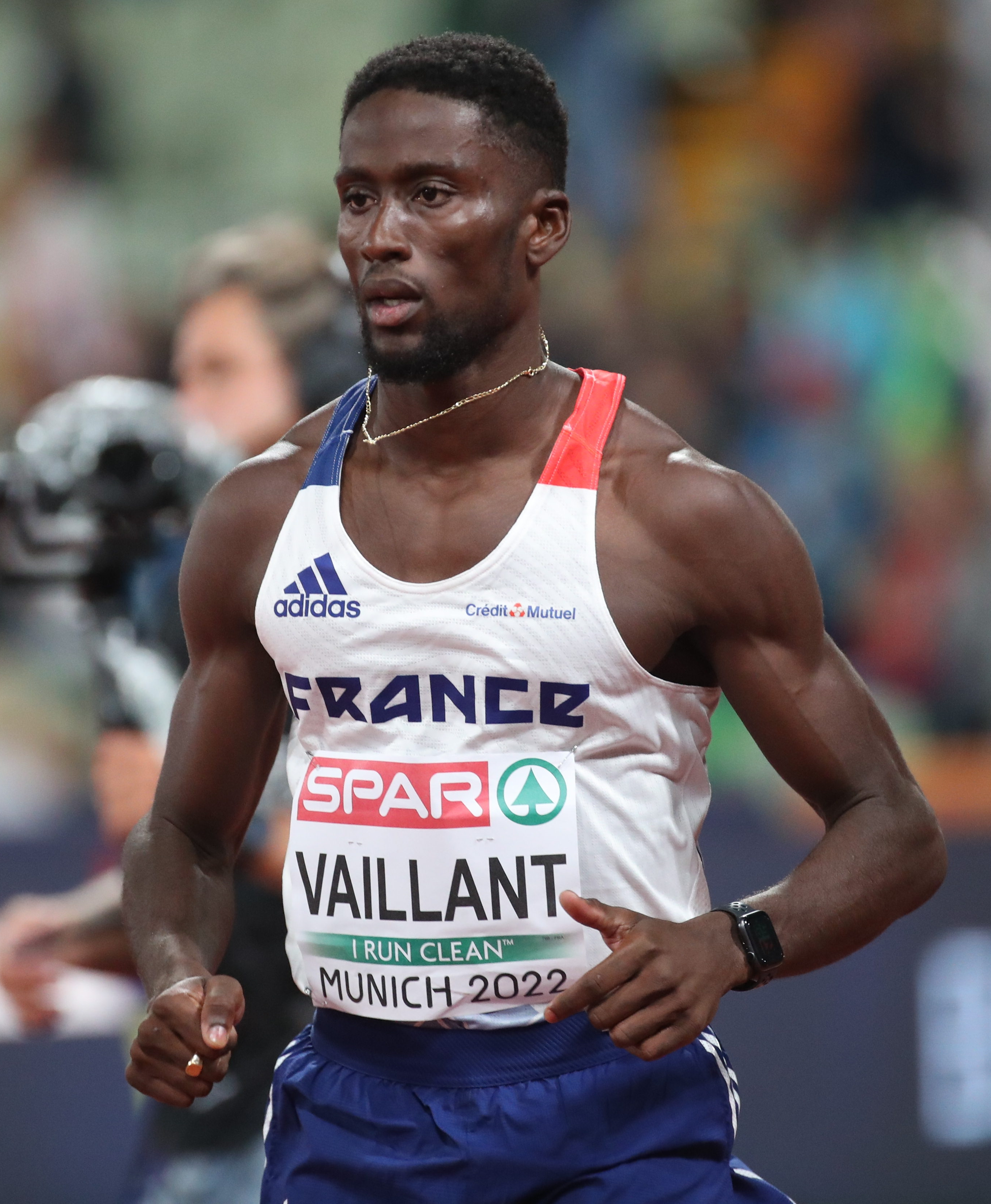
- Ludvy Vaillant in 2022

Personal information
- Born: 15 March 1995 (age 31) Fort-de-France, Martinique
- Height: 1.80 m (5 ft 11 in)
- Weight: 70 kg (154 lb)

Sport
- Sport: Athletics
- Event: 400 metres hurdles
- Club: AC Saleen
- Coached by: Berquier Jean-Claude (2012–)
Medal record
Men's athletics
Representing France
World Championships
Silver medal – second place	2023 Budapest	4×400 m relay
Mediterranean Games
Gold medal – first place	2018 Tarragona	400 m hurdles
Silver medal – second place	2022 Oran	400 m hurdles
European U23 Championships
Gold medal – first place	2015 Tallinn	4×400 m relay
Bronze medal – third place	2017 Bydgoszcz	400 m hurdles
Bronze medal – third place	2017 Bydgoszcz	4×400 m relay

Ludvy Vaillant (born 15 March 1995 in Fort-de-France, Martinique) is a French athlete competing primarily in the 400 metres hurdles. He represented his country at the 2017 World Championships reaching the semifinals. In addition, he won a bronze medal at the 2017 European U23 Championships.

His personal best in the event is 48.30 seconds set in Paris in 2019.

== Statistics ==
=== Circuit performances ===
Grand Slam Track results
Slam	Race group	Event	Pl.	Time	Prize money
2025 Miami Slam	Long hurdles	400 m hurdles	7th	50.38	US$12,500
2025 Miami Slam	Long hurdles	400 m	7th	47.22	US$12,500

=== International competitions ===
Year	Competition	Venue	Position	Event	Notes
Representing France
2013	European Junior Championships	Rieti, Italy	8th	400 m hurdles	52.29
2013	European Junior Championships	Rieti, Italy	4th	4 × 400 m relay	3:05.41
2015	European U23 Championships	Tallinn, Estonia	7th	400 m	47.04
2015	European U23 Championships	Tallinn, Estonia	1st	4 × 400 m relay	3:04.92
2016	European Championships	Amsterdam, Netherlands	12th (h)	4 × 400 m relay	3:04.95
2017	World Relays	Nassau, Bahamas	–	4 × 200 m relay	DQ
2017	European U23 Championships	Bydgoszcz, Poland	3rd	400 m hurdles	49.31
2017	European U23 Championships	Bydgoszcz, Poland	3rd	4 × 400 m relay	3:05.24
2017	World Championships	London, United Kingdom	15th (sf)	400 m hurdles	49.95
2017	World Championships	London, United Kingdom	8th	4 × 400 m relay	3:01.79
2018	Mediterranean Games	Tarragona, Spain	1st	400 m hurdles	48.76
2018	European Championships	Berlin, Germany	4th	400 m hurdles	48.42
2018	European Championships	Berlin, Germany	4th	4 × 400 m relay	3:02.08
2019	World Relays	Yokohama, Japan	2nd (B)	4 × 400 m relay	3:02.99
2019	World Championships	Doha, Qatar	12th (sf)	400 m hurdles	49.10
2019	World Championships	Doha, Qatar	7th	4 × 400 m relay	3:03.06
2021	Olympic Games	Tokyo, Japan	16th (sf)	400 m hurdles	49.02
2022	Mediterranean Games	Oran, Algeria	2nd	400 m hurdles	48.83
2022	Mediterranean Games	Oran, Algeria	5th	4 × 400 m relay	3:05.35
2022	European Championships	Munich, Germany	4th	400 m hurdles	48.79
2023	World Championships	Budapest, Hungary	11th (sf)	400 m hurdles	48.48
2023	World Championships	Budapest, Hungary	2nd	4 × 400 m relay	2:58.45
2026	Central American and Caribbean Games	Santo Domingo, Dominican Republic	6th	400 m hurdles	51.64^{1}
2026	Mediterranean Games	Taranto, Italy	6th	400 m hurdles	51.50

^{1}Representing Martinique
