= Przemysław Waściński =

Polish sprinter

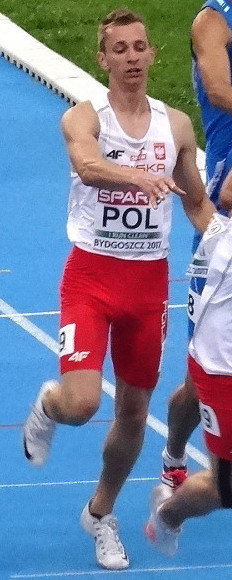
- Przemysław Waściński in 2017

Personal information
- Nationality: Polish
- Born: 29 March 1995 (age 31) Rawicz, Poland

Sport
- Sport: Running
Medal record
Men's athletics
Representing Poland
European Indoor Championships
Gold medal – first place	2017 Belgrade	4 × 400 m
European Athletics U23 Championships
Silver medal – second place	2017 Bydgoszcz	4 × 400 m

Przemysław Waściński (Polish pronunciation: [pʂɛˈmɨswav vaɕˈt͡ɕiɲski]; born 29 March 1995) is a Polish athlete who specializes in the 400 metres. He won gold in the 4 × 400 m relay at the 2017 European Athletics Indoor Championships.

As of 2017, he is a member of MUKS Kadet Rawicz and is coached by Aldona Świtała.

== Achievements ==
Year	Competition	Venue	Position	Event	Notes
Representing Poland
2017	European Indoor Championships	Belgrade, Serbia	1st	4 × 400 m relay	3:06.99
2017	World Relays	Nassau, Bahamas	15th (h)	4 × 400 m relay	3:08.42
2017	European U23 Championships	Bydgoszcz, Poland	2nd	4 × 400 m relay	3:04.22
2019	World Relays	Yokohama, Japan	14th (h)	4 × 400 m relay	3:04.90
