= 2014 World Junior Championships in Athletics – Men's decathlon =

The men's decathlon event at the 2014 World Junior Championships in Athletics was held in Eugene, Oregon, USA, at Hayward Field on 22 and 23 July.

== Medalists ==
Gold	Jiří Sýkora; Czech Republic
Silver	Cedric Dubler; Australia
Bronze	Tim Nowak; Germany

== Results ==
=== Final ===
22-23 July
Start time: 22 July 10:23 Temperature: 18 °C Humidity: 73 %
End time: 23 July 20:24 Temperature: 17 °C Humidity: 63 %

The highest mark recorded in each event is highlighted in yellow

Rank	Name	Nationality	100m	LJ	SP	HJ	400m	110m H	DT	PV	JT	1500m	Points	Notes
1st place, gold medalist(s)	Jiří Sýkora	Czech Republic	10.92 (w: +0.5 m/s); 878	7.35 (w: +2.0 m/s); 898	15.50; 820	1.94; 749	49.00; 861	14.23 (w: -0.1 m/s); 945	48.55; 840	4.40; 731	60.56; 746	4:42.10; 667	8135	CR
2nd place, silver medalist(s)	Cedric Dubler	Australia	10.80 (w: +0.6 m/s); 906	7.74 (w: +1.2 m/s); 995	13.02; 668	2.09; 887	48.75; 873	14.08 (w: -0.5 m/s); 964	38.25; 629	4.80; 849	53.63; 642	4:39.81; 681	8094	AJR
3rd place, bronze medalist(s)	Tim Nowak	Germany	11.09 (w: +1.4 m/s); 841	7.16 (w: +1.4 m/s); 852	14.47; 757	2.03; 831	49.60; 833	14.14 (w: -0.6 m/s); 957	42.42; 714	4.70; 819	59.74; 734	4:46.19; 642	7980	NJR
4	Evgeniy Likhanov	Russia	11.01 (w: +1.4 m/s); 858	7.72 (w: +2.0 m/s); 990	14.19; 740	2.09; 887	50.18; 806	14.87 (w: -0.1 m/s); 865	34.64; 556	4.60; 790	54.83; 660	4:47.12; 636	7788	SB
5	Roman Kondratyev	Russia	10.88 (w: +0.5 m/s); 888	7.29 w (w: +2.4 m/s); 883	14.93; 785	2.03; 831	49.25; 849	14.04 (w: -0.5 m/s); 969	37.56; 615	4.60; 790	47.66; 554	4:50.39; 616	7780	PB
6	Harrison Williams	United States	10.75 (w: +2.0 m/s); 917	6.80 (w: +0.7 m/s); 767	13.53; 700	1.94; 749	48.21; 899	14.37 (w: -0.9 m/s); 927	35.09; 565	4.90; 880	56.31; 682	4:41.01; 674	7760	PB
7	Fredriech Pretorius	South Africa	11.05 (w: +1.0 m/s); 850	7.31 (w: +0.4 m/s); 888	13.94; 725	1.97; 776	49.41; 842	14.20 (w: -0.5 m/s); 949	38.90; 642	4.20; 673	52.05; 619	4:33.04; 725	7689	
8	Gabriel Moore	United States	10.98 (w: +2.0 m/s); 865	7.01 (w: +1.8 m/s); 816	13.41; 692	1.97; 776	49.01; 861	14.82 (w: -0.6 m/s); 871	45.09; 769	4.30; 702	52.25; 622	4:45.68; 645	7619	PB
9	Taavi Tšernjavski	Estonia	11.19 (w: +1.4 m/s); 819	6.85 (w: -0.1 m/s); 778	14.73; 773	1.91; 723	50.48; 793	15.23 (w: -0.6 m/s); 822	46.16; 791	4.30; 702	56.63; 687	4:38.35; 691	7579	PB
10	Karsten Warholm	Norway	10.55 (w: +0.5 m/s); 963	7.53 w (w: +2.6 m/s); 942	11.60; 582	2.00; 803	47.21; 948	14.14 (w: -0.5 m/s); 957	36.05; 585	4.20; 673	43.77; 497	4:52.94; 601	7551	PB
11	Mathias Ako	France	11.01 (w: +2.0 m/s); 858	7.27 (w: +1.8 m/s); 878	13.98; 727	1.85; 670	51.72; 737	14.47 (w: -0.1 m/s); 915	46.49; 798	5.00; 910	44.68; 510	5:04.50; 534	7537	PB
12	Fredrik Samuelsson	Sweden	11.20 (w: +1.0 m/s); 817	7.03 (w: +1.7 m/s); 821	14.62; 766	1.94; 749	50.74; 781	14.90 (w: -0.6 m/s); 862	40.02; 665	4.40; 731	52.64; 628	4:37.96; 693	7513	SB
13	David Hall	United Kingdom	10.89 (w: +1.0 m/s); 885	6.66 w (w: +2.2 m/s); 734	13.62; 705	1.97; 776	47.85; 916	14.98 (w: -0.9 m/s); 852	35.77; 579	4.10; 645	53.53; 641	4:35.82; 707	7440	PB
14	Jan Deuber	Switzerland	10.95 (w: +0.6 m/s); 872	7.27 (w: +0.5 m/s); 878	12.76; 653	1.91; 723	50.21; 805	14.60 (w: -0.5 m/s); 899	35.90; 582	4.50; 760	50.44; 595	4:45.43; 646	7413	NJR
15	Wang Qunhao	China	11.45 (w: +0.6 m/s); 763	6.87 (w: 0.0 m/s); 783	12.59; 642	1.97; 776	49.63; 832	14.52 (w: -0.6 m/s); 908	36.86; 601	4.40; 731	53.35; 638	4:40.38; 678	7352	
16	Jan Doležal	Czech Republic	11.03 (w: +1.0 m/s); 854	6.97 (w: +0.3 m/s); 807	14.74; 774	1.76; 593	49.94; 817	14.25 (w: -0.9 m/s); 942	45.91; 786	4.50; 760	37.98; 413	4:59.36; 563	7309	
17	Elmo Savola	Finland	11.08 (w: +1.4 m/s); 843	6.99 (w: +1.1 m/s); 811	13.22; 681	1.97; 776	50.37; 798	14.53 (w: -0.1 m/s); 907	27.32; 412	4.50; 760	62.18; 771	5:07.18; 519	7278	
18	Luca Bernaschina	Switzerland	11.09 (w: +0.6 m/s); 841	7.39 w (w: +2.5 m/s); 908	14.50; 759	1.82; 644	51.29; 756	14.66 (w: -0.1 m/s); 891	34.34; 550	4.20; 673	49.33; 579	4:46.25; 641	7242	PB
19	Alex Soares	Brazil	11.20 (w: +0.6 m/s); 817	7.18 (w: 0.0 m/s); 857	15.21; 803	1.79; 619	50.16; 807	14.86 (w: -0.1 m/s); 867	39.07; 646	4.10; 645	50.08; 590	5:03.00; 543	7194	
20	Santiago Ford	Cuba	11.26 (w: +0.6 m/s); 804	6.71 (w: -1.0 m/s); 746	13.55; 701	2.03; 831	50.27; 802	14.75 (w: -0.6 m/s); 880	33.65; 537	3.90; 590	54.17; 651	4:46.78; 638	7180	
21	Sybren Blok	Netherlands	10.99 (w: +0.5 m/s); 863	6.80 (w: +1.1 m/s); 767	14.19; 740	1.79; 619	51.91; 729	15.29 (w: -0.5 m/s); 815	40.78; 680	4.40; 731	56.06; 679	5:02.90; 543	7166	
22	Pablo Trescolí	Spain	11.21 (w: +0.6 m/s); 814	6.55 w (w: +2.2 m/s); 709	13.10; 673	1.85; 670	49.43; 841	15.02 (w: -0.6 m/s); 847	36.91; 602	4.20; 673	50.61; 598	4:30.84; 739	7166	
23	Benjamin Hougardy	Belgium	11.65 (w: +2.0 m/s); 721	6.84 (w: +1.8 m/s); 776	12.16; 616	2.03; 831	51.39; 752	15.67 (w: -0.6 m/s); 770	35.68; 577	4.60; 790	47.92; 558	4:28.77; 753	7144	
24	Andreas Gustafsson	Sweden	11.21 (w: +0.5 m/s); 814	6.74 w (w: +2.7 m/s); 753	12.86; 659	1.94; 749	50.44; 794	14.73 (w: -0.6 m/s); 882	29.60; 457	4.40; 731	45.44; 708	4:35.59; 521	7068	
25	David Thomson	Australia	11.37 (w: +2.0 m/s); 780	6.96 w (w: +3.3 m/s); 804	13.86; 720	1.97; 776	51.00; 769	15.84 (w: -0.6 m/s); 751	40.99; 685	4.50; 760	52.72; 629	5:40.06; 351	7025	
26	Loek van Zevenbergen	Netherlands	10.87 (w: +1.0 m/s); 890	7.29 (w: +1.4 m/s); 883	11.78; 593	1.94; 749	50.21; 805	15.31 (w: -0.9 m/s); 812	36.23; 588	4.00; 617	48.02; 559	5:30.38; 397	6893	
27	Felipe Ruíz	Mexico	11.74 (w: +2.0 m/s); 703	6.04 w (w: +2.1 m/s); 595	12.68; 648	1.73; 569	51.56; 744	15.86 (w: -0.9 m/s); 749	33.51; 534	3.80; 562	51.10; 605	4:35.34; 710	6419	
28	Carlos Sánchez	Spain	11.16 (w: +1.0 m/s); 825	6.55 (w: +1.6 m/s); 709	13.15; 676	1.79; 619	51.21; 760	14.84 (w: -0.6 m/s); 869	35.01; 564	NM; 0	48.56; 567	4:46.11; 642	6231	
	Fabian Christ	Germany	10.99 (w: +0.5 m/s); 863	7.18 (w: +0.6 m/s); 857	12.58; 642	1.94; 749	47.67; 925	14.39 (w: -0.5 m/s); 925	34.07; 545	4.80; 849	NM; 0	DNS	DNF	
	Jefferson Santos	Brazil	11.12 (w: +1.4 m/s); 834	7.18 (w: +1.3 m/s); 857	14.05; 731	2.00; 803	51.37; 753	14.75 (w: -0.1 m/s); 880	46.09; 789	NM; 0	DNS		DNF	
	Yuriy Yeryomich	Belarus	10.92 (w: +0.5 m/s); 878	7.80 w (w: +2.1 m/s); 1010	13.50; 698	1.94; 749	50.35; 799	14.36 (w: -0.6 m/s); 929	28.24; 430	NM; 0	DNS		DNF	
	Aleksandar Grnović	Serbia	11.28 (w: +1.0 m/s); 799	6.72 (w: +0.4 m/s); 748	14.09; 734	1.73; 569	49.97; 816	15.14 (w: -0.9 m/s); 833	DNS				DNF	
	Simone Fassina	Italy	11.39 (w: +1.4 m/s); 776	6.35 (w: -1.4 m/s); 664	12.40; 631	1.94; 749	52.81; 690	DNS					DNF	
	Vincent Stas	Belgium	10.95 (w: +1.4 m/s); 872	7.13 (w: +1.3 m/s); 845	DNS								DNF	

== Participation ==
According to an unofficial count, 34 athletes from 23 countries participated in the event.

- Australia (2)
- Belarus (1)
- Belgium (2)
- Brazil (2)
- China (1)
- Cuba (1)
- Czech Republic (2)
- Estonia (1)
- Finland (1)
- France (1)
- Germany (2)
- Italy (1)
- Mexico (1)
- Netherlands (2)
- Norway (1)
- Russia (2)
- Serbia (1)
- South Africa (1)
- Spain (2)
- Sweden (2)
- Switzerland (2)
- United Kingdom (1)
- United States (2)
