= Victor Coroller =

French hurdler

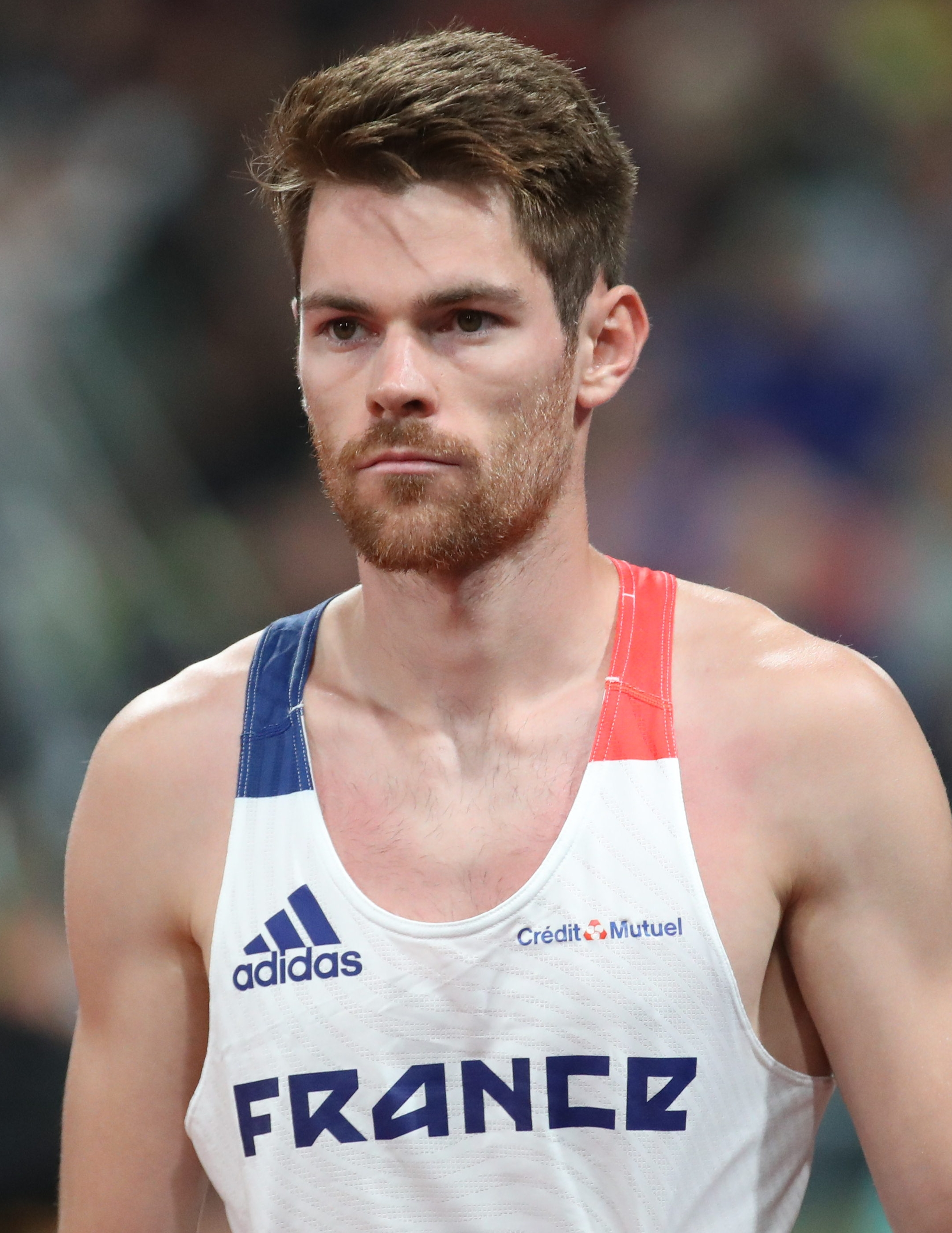
- Victor Coroller in 2022

Personal information
- Born: 29 January 1997 (age 29) Rennes, France
- Height: 1.81 m (5 ft 11 in)

Sport
- Sport: Athletics
- Event(s): 400 metres hurdles, 400 metres
- Club: Haute-Bretagne Athlétisme
- Coached by: Marc Reuzé
Medal record
Men's athletics
Representing France
European Indoor Championships
Silver medal – second place	2023 Istanbul	4 × 400 m relay

Victor Coroller (born 29 January 1997 in Rennes) is a French athlete specialising in the 400 metres and 400 metres hurdles. He represented his country at the 2017 World Championships reaching the semifinals. Earlier, he won a bronze medal at the 2014 Summer Youth Olympics.

His personal best in the 400 m is 47.07 seconds outdoor set in Stadio Comunale, Bellinzona, Switzerland on 28 July 2022. In 2023, he ran 47.01 indoors in Metz. His personal best in the 400 m hurdles is 49.11, which he ran in La Chaux-de-Fonds in 2022.

== International competitions ==
Year	Competition	Venue	Position	Event	Notes
Representing France
2013	European Youth Olympic Festival	Utrecht, Netherlands	1st	400 m hurdles (84 cm)	52.85
2013	European Youth Olympic Festival	Utrecht, Netherlands	1st	4 × 100 m relay	42.33
2014	Youth Olympic Games	Nanjing, China	3rd	400 m hurdles (84 cm)	51.19
2015	European Junior Championships	Eskilstuna, Sweden	1st	400 m hurdles	50.53
2015	European Junior Championships	Eskilstuna, Sweden	–	4 × 400 m relay	DQ
2016	World U20 Championships	Bydgoszcz, Poland	10th (sf)	400 m hurdles	51.35
2017	European U23 Championships	Bydgoszcz, Poland	4th	400 m hurdles	49.96
2017	European U23 Championships	Bydgoszcz, Poland	3rd	4 × 400 m relay	3:05.24
2017	World Championships	London, United Kingdom	21st (sf)	400 m hurdles	55.69
2018	European Championships	Berlin, Germany	11th (sf)	400 m hurdles	49.34
2019	European U23 Championships	Gävle, Sweden	9th (sf)	400 m hurdles	50.89
2021	World Relays	Chorzów, Poland	7th	4 × 400 m relay	3:06.16
2022	European Championships	Munich, Germany	8th	400 m hurdles	50.46
2023	European Indoor Championships	Istanbul, Turkey	2nd	4 × 400 m relay	3:06.52
