= Andrew Mellon (athlete) =

Irish sprinter

Andrew Mellon (born 3 November 1995 in Bangor) is an Irish sprinter. Born in Northern Ireland, he represents Ireland. He attended Bangor Grammar School from 2006 to 2014. He contributed to the third place of the relay 4x400 meters during the 2019 European Team Championships in Sandnes, permitting the Irish team not to be relegated.
