= Costa Rica at the 2025 World Athletics Championships =

- Flag of Costa Rica
- WA code: CRC

in Tokyo, Japan 13 September 2025 – 21 September 2025
- Competitors: 3 (1 man and 2 women)
- Medals: Gold 0 Silver 0 Bronze 0 Total 0

World Athletics Championships appearances
- 1983; 1987; 1991; 1993; 1995; 1997; 1999; 2001; 2003; 2005; 2007; 2009; 2011; 2013; 2015; 2017; 2019; 2022; 2023; 2025

Costa Rica competed at the 2025 World Athletics Championships in Tokyo, Japan, from 13 to 21 September 2025. Costa Rica entered 3 athletes: 1 man and 2 women.

== Results ==
Key

- Q = Qualified for the next round
- q = Qualified for the next round as a fastest loser or, in field events, by position without achieving the qualifying target
- NR = National record
- PB = Personal best
- SB = Season best
- N/A = Round not applicable for the event

=== Men ===
Track and road events

Athlete	Event	Heat		Semifinal		Final	
Athlete	Event	Result	Rank	Result	Rank	Result	Rank
Gerald Drummond	400 metres hurdles	48.81 SB	4 Q	49.58	7	Did not advance	

=== Women ===
Track and road events

Athlete	Event	Heat		Semifinal		Final	
Athlete	Event	Result	Rank	Result	Rank	Result	Rank
Daniela Rojas	400 metres hurdles	56.08	7	Did not advance			
Diana Bogantes	Marathon	—N/a				2:54:02 SB	55
