= Great Britain and Northern Ireland at the 2025 World Athletics Championships =

- Flag of Great Britain
- WA code: GBR

in Tokyo, Japan 13 September 2025 – 21 September 2025
- Competitors: 67 (32 men and 35 women)
- Medals Ranked 21st: Gold 0 Silver 3 Bronze 2 Total 5

World Athletics Championships appearances (overview)
- 1976; 1980; 1983; 1987; 1991; 1993; 1995; 1997; 1999; 2001; 2003; 2005; 2007; 2009; 2011; 2013; 2015; 2017; 2019; 2022; 2023; 2025

Great Britain and Northern Ireland competed at the 2025 World Athletics Championships in Tokyo, Japan, from 13 to 21 September 2025.

Athletes from Great Britain and Northern Ireland won three silver medals and two bronze medals. It was the team's lowest medal total since the 2005 championships, and the first time the nation had not won a gold medal since the 2003 edition.

== Medallists ==
Medal	Name	Event	Date
Silver	Jake Wightman	Men's 1500 metres	17 September
Silver	Amy Hunt	Women's 200 metres	19 September
Silver	Georgia Hunter Bell	Women's 800 metres	21 September
Bronze	Katarina Johnson-Thompson	Women's heptathlon	20 September
Bronze	Keely Hodgkinson	Women's 800 metres	21 September

== Results ==
Great Britain and Northern Ireland entered 67 athletes to the championships: 35 women and 32 men.

Key

- Q = Qualified for the next round
- q = Qualified for the next round as a fastest loser or, in field events, by position without achieving the qualifying target
- NR = National record
- PB = Personal best
- SB = Season best
- N/A = Round not applicable for the event

=== Men ===
Track and road events

Athlete	Event	Heat		Semifinal		Final	
Athlete	Event	Result	Rank	Result	Rank	Result	Rank
Jeremiah Azu	100 metres	10.10	3 Q	10.05	4	Did not advance	
Romell Glave	100 metres	10.00 =PB	4 q	10.09	6	Did not advance	
Zharnel Hughes	100 metres	10.06	2 Q	10.03	3	Did not advance	
Toby Harries	200 metres	20.76	7	Did not advance			
Zharnel Hughes	200 metres	20.07	2 Q	19.95	2 Q	19.78 SB	5
Charlie Dobson	400 metres	44.85	3 Q	44.85	7	Did not advance	
Matthew Hudson-Smith	400 metres	44.68	4 q	44.95	6	Did not advance	
Samuel Reardon	400 metres	44.70	4 q	45.10	8	Did not advance	
Max Burgin	800 metres	1:44.73	1 Q	1:43.37	2 Q	1:42.29 PB	6
Tiarnan Crorken	800 metres	1:45.63	5	Did not advance			
Ben Pattison	800 metres	1:46.51	2 Q	1:45.84	5	Did not advance	
Elliot Giles	1500 metres	3:41.60	8	Did not advance			
Neil Gourley	1500 metres	3:42.13	3 Q	3:36.93	5 Q	3:35.56	10
Josh Kerr	1500 metres	3:35.98	2 Q	3:35.53	2 Q	4:11.23	14
Jake Wightman	1500 metres	3:36.90	1 Q	3:35.56	3 Q	3:34.12	2nd place, silver medalist(s)
George Mills	5000 metres	13:41.76	4 Q	—N/a		13:44.88	16
Emile Cairess	Marathon	—N/a				DNF	
Tade Ojora	110 metres hurdles	13.90	8	Did not advance			
Alastair Chalmers	400 metres hurdles	48.86	4 Q	49.49	6	Did not advance	
Seamus Derbyshire	400 metres hurdles	49.20	7	Did not advance			
Tyri Donovan	400 metres hurdles	48.26 PB	2 Q	48.21 PB	4	Did not advance	
Eugene Amo-Dadzie; Jeremiah Azu; Jona Efoloko; Louie Hinchliffe	4 × 100 metres relay	DNF		—N/a		Did not advance	
Lewis Davey; Seamus Derbyshire*; Charlie Dobson; Toby Harries; Lee Thompson	4 × 400 metres relay	2:58.11 SB	3 Q	—N/a		3:03.05	6
Cameron Corbishley	35 kilometres walk	—N/a				2:52:15	34

* – Indicates the athlete competed in preliminaries but not the final

Field events

Athlete	Event	Qualification		Final	
Athlete	Event	Distance	Position	Distance	Position
Scott Lincoln	Shot put	21.00	5 q	21.00	8
Lawrence Okoye	Discus	63.50	15	Did not advance	
Nicholas Percy	Discus	57.08	33	Did not advance	
Jake Norris	Hammer throw	73.07	25	Did not advance	

=== Women ===
Track and road events

Athlete	Event	Heat		Semifinal		Final	
Athlete	Event	Result	Rank	Result	Rank	Result	Rank
Dina Asher-Smith	100 metres	11.07	2 Q	11.02	3 q	11.08	8
Amy Hunt	100 metres	11.13	2 Q	11.05	3	Did not advance	
Daryll Neita	100 metres	10.94 SB	1 Q	11.06	4	Did not advance	
Dina Asher-Smith	200 metres	22.40	1 Q	22.21	2 Q	22.43	5
Amy Hunt	200 metres	22.57	2 Q	22.08 PB	2 Q	22.14	2nd place, silver medalist(s)
Daryll Neita	200 metres	22.59	3 Q	22.77	4	Did not advance	
Amber Anning	400 metres	49.96	2 Q	49.38 SB	2 Q	49.36 SB	5
Yemi Mary John	400 metres	50.71	5 q	51.51	8	Did not advance	
Victoria Ohuruogu	400 metres	51.37	4 q	51.65	8	Did not advance	
Keely Hodgkinson	800 metres	1:59.79	1 Q	1:57.53	1 Q	1:54.91	3rd place, bronze medalist(s)
Georgia Hunter Bell	800 metres	1:58.82	1 Q	1:58.62	2 Q	1:54.90 PB	2nd place, silver medalist(s)
Jemma Reekie	800 metres	1:59.35	5	Did not advance			
Laura Muir	1500 metres	4:05.59	8	Did not advance			
Revée Walcott-Nolan	1500 metres	4:08.67	6 Q	4:11.07	8	Did not advance	
Erin Wallace	1500 metres	4:06.07	8	Did not advance			
Melissa Courtney-Bryant	5000 metres	15:27.70	16	—N/a		Did not advance	
Innes FitzGerald	5000 metres	15:15.83	18	—N/a		Did not advance	
Hannah Nuttall	5000 metres	14:48.09	7 Q	—N/a		15:01.25	8
Calli Hauger-Thackery	10,000 metres	—N/a				31:37.81	11
Megan Keith	10,000 metres	—N/a				31:33.85	10
Emily Newnham	400 metres hurdles	54.59	2 Q	54.64	6	Did not advance	
Lina Nielsen	400 metres hurdles	55.82	6	Did not advance			
Sarah Tait	3000 metres steeplechase	DNF		—N/a		Did not advance	
Elise Thorner	3000 metres steeplechase	9:14.37 PB	3 Q	—N/a		9:19.02	11
Dina Asher-Smith; Success Eduan*; Desiree Henry; Amy Hunt; Daryll Neita	4 × 100 metres relay	41.88	3 Q	—N/a		42.07	4
Yemi Mary John; Poppy Malik; Victoria Ohuruogu; Nicole Yeargin	4 × 400 metres relay	3:25.84	8	—N/a		Did not advance	

* – Indicates the athlete competed in preliminaries but not the final

Field events

Athlete	Event	Qualification		Final	
Athlete	Event	Distance	Position	Distance	Position
Morgan Lake	High jump	1.92	1 q	1.93	7
Molly Caudery	Pole vault	DNS		Did not advance	
Jazmin Sawyers	Long jump	6.54	16	Did not advance	
Anna Purchase	Hammer throw	69.35	18	Did not advance	

Combined events – Heptathlon

Athlete	Event	100H	HJ	SP	200 m	LJ	JT	800 m	Final	Rank
Katarina Johnson-Thompson	Result	13.44 SB	1.86 SB	13.37 SB	23.51 SB	6.42	41.91	2:07.38 SB	6581 SB	3rd place, bronze medalist(s)
Katarina Johnson-Thompson	Points	1059	1054	752	1028	981	704	1003	6581 SB	3rd place, bronze medalist(s)
Jade O’Dowda	Result	13.34 PB	1.80	13.55	25.07 SB	6.49 SB	46.20 PB	2:14.18 SB	6391 PB	8
Jade O’Dowda	Points	1074	978	764	880	1004	787	904	6391 PB	8
Abigail Pawlett	Result	14.70	1.80 PB	13.85	23.25	5.98	DNS		DNF	
Abigail Pawlett	Points	882	978	784	1054	843	—N/a		DNF	

=== Mixed ===
Athlete	Event	Heat		Final	
Athlete	Event	Result	Rank	Result	Rank
Lewis Davey; Toby Harries; Yemi Mary John*; Emily Newnham; Nicole Yeargin	4 × 400 metres relay	3:10.22	2 Q	3:10.84	5

* – Indicates the athlete competed in preliminaries but not the final
