= Caleb Dean =

American athlete (born 2001)

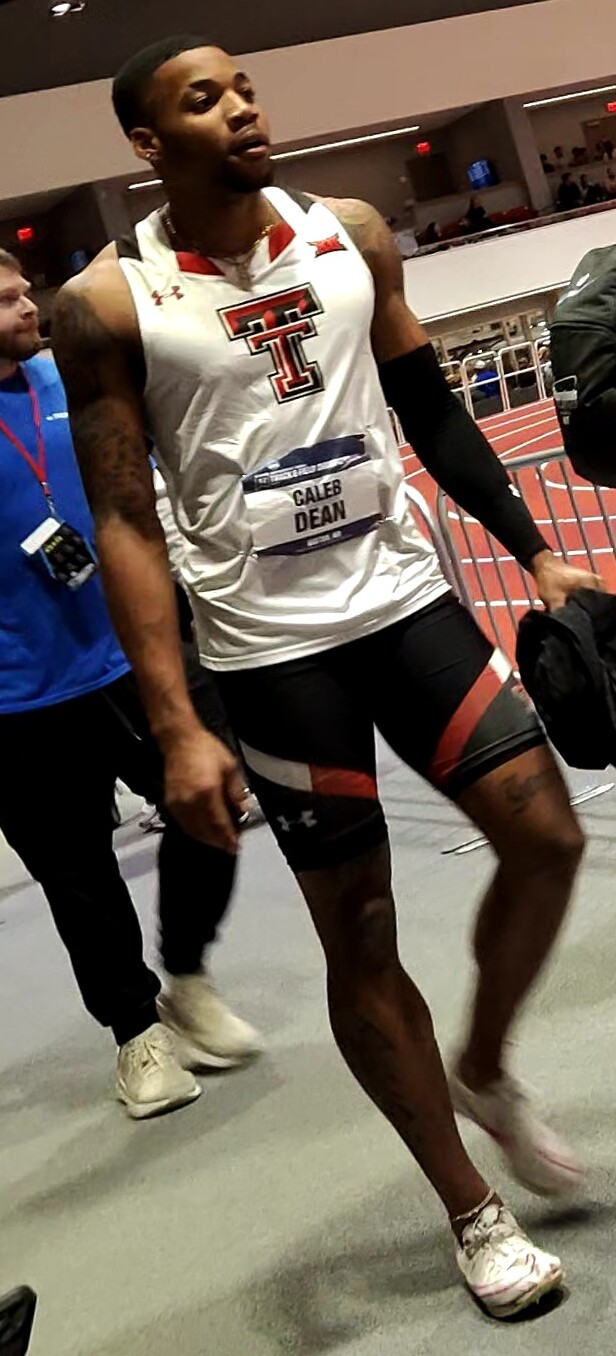
- Dean at the 2024 NCAA Division I Indoor Track and Field Championships

Personal information
- Nationality: American
- Born: June 20, 2001 (age 25)

Sport
- Sport: Athletics
- Event: Hurdles

Achievements and titles
- Personal bests: 400m hurdles: 47.23 (Eugene, 2024)

Caleb Dean (born June 20, 2001) is an American track and field athlete who competes as a hurdler. In 2024, he won the 60-meter hurdles at the NCAA Division I Indoor Track and Field Championships and the 400-meter hurdles at the Outdoor Championships.

== Early life ==
Dean is from Hyattsville, Maryland, where he attended DeMatha Catholic High School.

== Collegiate career ==
Dean started his collegiate career at the University of Maryland. He was a two-time Big Ten Champion as well as a two-time Big Ten runner-up. After his junior year, he transferred to Texas Tech University. In his two years as a Red Raider, he accumulated four Big 12 championships and three Big 12 runner-up finishes.

Dean won the 60 meter hurdles at the NCAA Indoor Championships in March 2024 in Boston, Massachusetts. Texas Tech won the team title that same year.

Dean qualified fastest for the final of the 400m hurdles at the NCAA Outdoor Championships in Eugene, Oregon on 5 June 2024. He ran 47.23 seconds to win the title on 7 June 2024 ahead of defending champion Chris Robinson. Only Rai Benjamin had run faster in collegiate history. Dean was also the first Division I male to win nationals in the 60m hurdles and 400m hurdles in the same season. At the end of the 2024 season, he was named national track athlete of the year by the USTFCCCA, and a finalist for the Bowerman Award.

== Professional career ==
In July 2024, Dean signed a professional contract with Adidas.

In December 2024, he signed with Grand Slam Track to compete in all four slams of the inaugural season in 2025. In the first slam, held in Kingston, Jamaica, he finished third over 400m hurdles, running 48.58 seconds in April 2025. At the second 2025 Grand Slam Track event in Miami, he finished fifth in the 400 meter hurdles with a time of 49.90 seconds on 2 May 2025, and then third in the 400 meter flat race in 45.18 seconds.

He ran 48.45 seconds to finish as runner-up to Rai Benjamin in the final of the 400 metres hurdles at the 2025 USA Outdoor Track and Field Championships in Eugene. Selected for the 2025 World Athletics Championships in Tokyo, Japan, in September 2025, he was a finalist in the men's 400 metres hurdles, placing seventh overall.

In May 2026, he placed sixth in the 300 m hurdles at the 2026 Shanghai Diamond League before placing third in the 400 metres hurdles at the 2026 Xiamen Diamond League, in 47.75 seconds, and 47.42 seconds to place third the USATF Lone Star Grand Prix in College Station, Texas on 6 June. On 10 June, he placed third over 400 metres hurdles at the 2026 Bislett Games. On 14 July, he also placed third overall at the István Gyulai Memorial, in Budapest. On 26 July, he ran 48.66 seconds in the final of the 400 metres hurdles for a third place finish at the 2026 USA Championships in New York. At the 2026 Diamond League Final in Brussels in September, he placed fifth in the 400 metres hurdles.

== Statistics ==
=== Circuit performances ===
Grand Slam Track results
| Slam | Race group | Event | Pl. | Time | Prize money |
|---|---|---|---|---|---|
| 2025 Kingston Slam | Long hurdles | 400 m hurdles | 3rd | 48.58 | US$30,000 |
| 2025 Kingston Slam | Long hurdles | 400 m | 3rd | 45.68 | US$30,000 |
| 2025 Miami Slam | Long hurdles | 400 m hurdles | 5th | 49.90 | US$30,000 |
| 2025 Miami Slam | Long hurdles | 400 m | 3rd | 45.18 | US$30,000 |
| 2025 Philadelphia Slam | Long hurdles | 400 m hurdles | 4th | 49.48 | US$25,000 |
| 2025 Philadelphia Slam | Long hurdles | 400 m | 4th | 46.01 | US$25,000 |

=== Championship results ===
All results taken from World Athletics profile.

| Year | Meet | Venue | Event | Place | Time |
|---|---|---|---|---|---|
| 2021 | NCAA Outdoor Championships | Hayward Field | 400m hurdles | SF3 4th | 50.45 |
| 2021 | US Olympic trials | Hayward Field | 400m hurdles | SF1 5th | 49.78 |
| 2022 | NCAA Outdoor Championships | Hayward Field | 400m hurdles | SF2 DQ | NA |
| 2023 | NCAA Indoor Championships | Albuquerque Convention Center | 60m hurdles | 2nd | 7.59 |
| 2023 | NCAA Outdoor Championships | Mike A. Myers Stadium | 110m hurdles | SF1 3rd | 13.56 |
| 2023 | NCAA Outdoor Championships | Mike A. Myers Stadium | 400m hurdles | 4th | 48.56 |
| 2024 | NCAA Indoor Championships | The TRACK at New Balance | 60m | 6th | 6.67 |
| 2024 | NCAA Indoor Championships | The TRACK at New Balance | 60m hurdles | 1st | 7.56 |
| 2024 | NCAA Indoor Championships | The TRACK at New Balance | 4x400m | 4th | 3:03.37 |
| 2024 | NCAA Outdoor Championships | Hayward Field | 400m hurdles | 1st | 47.23 |
| 2024 | US Olympic trials | Hayward Field | 400m hurdles | Final | DNF |
