= Turkey at the 2025 World Athletics Championships =

- Flag of Turkey
- WA code: TUR

in Tokyo, Japan 13 September 2025 – 21 September 2025
- Competitors: 20 (12 men and 8 women)
- Medals: Gold 0 Silver 0 Bronze 0 Total 0

World Athletics Championships appearances (overview)
- 1983; 1987; 1991; 1993; 1995; 1997; 1999; 2001; 2003; 2005; 2007; 2009; 2011; 2013; 2015; 2017; 2019; 2022; 2023; 2025

Turkey competed at the 2025 World Athletics Championships in Tokyo, Japan, from 13 to 21 September 2025.

== Results ==
Turkey (as Türkiye) entered 20 athletes to the championships: 8 women and 12 men.

Key

- Q = Qualified for the next round
- q = Qualified for the next round as a fastest loser or, in field events, by position without achieving the qualifying target
- NR = National record
- PB = Personal best
- SB = Season best
- N/A = Round not applicable for the event

=== Men ===
Track and road events

Athlete	Event	Heat		Semifinal		Final	
Athlete	Event	Result	Rank	Result	Rank	Result	Rank
Sezgin Ataç	Marathon	—N/a				DNF	
İlham Tanui Özbilen	Marathon	—N/a				2:23:35	55
Kaan Kigen Özbilen	Marathon	—N/a				2:13:27	19
Berke Akçam	400 metres hurdles	48.68	4 Q	49.10	5	Did not advance	
İsmail Nezir	400 metres hurdles	49.66	6	Did not advance			
Mazlum Demir	20 kilometres walk	—N/a				1:24:11	35
Hayrettin Yıldız	20 kilometres walk	—N/a				DQ	

Field events

Athlete	Event	Qualification		Final	
Athlete	Event	Distance	Position	Distance	Position
Ersu Şaşma	Pole vault	5.75	11 q	NM	
Can Özüpek	Triple jump	15.65	31	Did not advance	
Ali Peker	Shot put	18.36	31	Did not advance	
Özkan Baltacı	Hammer throw	69.34	35	Did not advance	
Halil Yilmazer	Hammer throw	71.71	31	Did not advance	

=== Women ===
Track and road events

Athlete	Event	Heat		Semifinal		Final	
Athlete	Event	Result	Rank	Result	Rank	Result	Rank
Şilan Ayyıldız	1500 metres	4:09.50	8	Did not advance			
Meryem Bekmez	20 kilometres walk	—N/a				DNF	
Kader Güvenç	35 kilometres walk	—N/a				3:14:46 PB	33

Field events

Athlete	Event	Qualification		Final	
Athlete	Event	Distance	Position	Distance	Position
Buse Savaşkan	High jump	NM		Did not advance	
Tuğba Danışmaz	Triple jump	14.00	12 q	13.43	12
Özlem Becerek	Discus throw	57.20	31	Did not advance	
Eda Tuğsuz	Javelin throw	56.16	27	Did not advance	
Esra Türkmen	Javelin throw	55.99	28	Did not advance	
