= Seamus Derbyshire =

British athlete (born 2000)

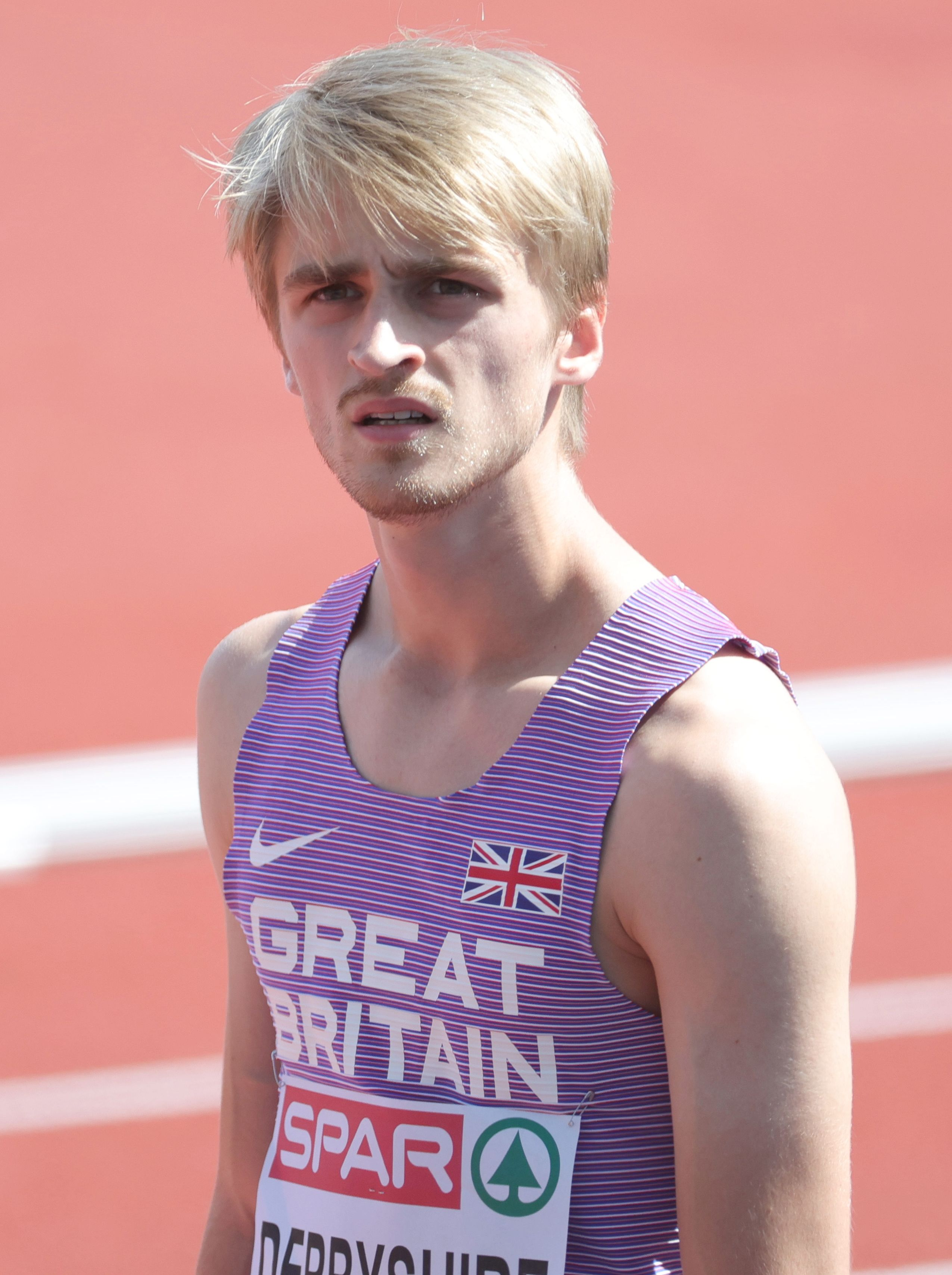

Personal information
- Nationality: British (English)
- Born: 27 January 2000 (age 26)

Sport
- Sport: Athletics
- Event: 400m hurdles
- Club: City of Stoke AC

Achievements and titles
- Personal bests: 400m: 47.02 (Birmingham, 2022); 400m hurdles : 48.42 (Geneva, 2025)
Medal record
Men's athletics
Representing Great Britain
European U20 Championships
Silver medal – second place	2019 Borås	400 m hurdles
British Championships
Silver medal – second place	2023 Manchester	400m hurdles
Representing England
Commonwealth Youth Games
Silver medal – second place	2017 Bahamas	400m hurdles

Seamus Derbyshire (born 27 January 2000) is a British track and field athlete who competes in the 400m hurdles.

== Early life ==
From Stockton Brook, in Staffordshire Moorlands, his running club is the City of Stoke Athletics Club in Stoke-on-Trent. He attended Loughborough University.

== Career ==
=== Junior career ===
Derbyshire won a silver medal in the 400m hurdles at the 2017 Commonwealth Youth Games in Nassau, Bahamas, finishing behind Alastair Chalmers. He won another silver medal at the 2019 European Athletics U20 Championships held in Borås.

=== Senior career ===
Derbyshire set a new personal best time for the 400m hurdles of 49.94 seconds in Oordegem, Belgium, in May 2022. He made his senior Great Britain debut at the 2022 European Athletics Championships in Munich, in August 2022, in which qualified for the semi-finals of the 400m hurdles.

Derbyshire wore the British vest again the following year, finishing third in the 2023 European Athletics Team Championships First Division 400m hurdles race, in Chorzów, in June 2023. That month in Geneva, he lowered his 400 metres hurdles personal best to 49.29 seconds. In July 2023, he finished as runner-up at the UK National Championships 400m hurdles in Manchester, behind Alastair Chalmers.

Derbyshire was selected for the British team for the 2025 European Athletics Indoor Championships in Apeldoorn. In Prague in June 2025, he moved to fifth on the British all-time list with a time of 48.47 for the 400 metres hurdles. He finished second to Tyri Donovan at the London Athletics Meet on 19 July. On 3 August, he placed third in the final of the 400 metres hurdles at the 2025 UK Athletics Championships in Birmingham. He was selected as part of the British team for the 2025 World Athletics Championships in Tokyo, Japan, where he ran on the men's 400 metres hurdles. He also ran at the championships in the men's 4 x 400 metres relay, helping the British team qualify for the final.

Derbyshire ran 47.12 seconds in the final to win bronze in the 400 metres at the 2026 British Indoor Athletics Championships in Birmingham on 15 February 2026. In May, he ran at the 2026 World Athletics Relays in the men's 4 × 400 metres relay in Gaborone, Botswana. On 21 June, he finished fourth in the 400 metres hurdles final at the 2026 UK Athletics Championships. He was selected to represent England at the 2026 Commonwealth Games in Glasgow, reaching the final of the 400 metres hurdles and placing fifth overall.

== Personal life ==
Derbyshire is gay. He has spoken about anxiety which has on occasion prevented him from competing. He has received recognition on social media for his theatrical pre-race introductions which he has described as part of his desire to be his "authentic self".
