= 2025 World Athletics Championships – Men's 400 metres hurdles =

Men's 400 metres hurdles at the 2025 World Athletics Championships
- Venue: National Stadium
- Location: Tokyo, Japan
- Dates: 15 September (heats); 17 September (semi-finals); 19 September (final)
- Winning time: 46.52

Medalists
gold medal	Rai Benjamin	United States
silver medal	Alison dos Santos	Brazil
bronze medal	Abderrahman Samba	Qatar

The men's 400 metres hurdles at the 2025 World Athletics Championships was held at the National Stadium in Tokyo on 15, 17 and 19 September 2025.

== Summary ==
Starting in 1976, Edwin Moses became legend in this event. He could consistently run under 48 seconds which allowed him to run undefeated for over a decade. His 1983 world record 47.02 made 47 seconds seem like a pretty substantial barrier. Just under a decade later Kevin Young did break 47 winning the 1992 Olympics in 46.78 to set a new world record. That was it, nobody was able to get under 47 for more than a quarter of a century, until Abderrahman Samba dipped his toe over the line running 46.98 in 2018. Then the floodgates opened in 2019. Karsten Warholm and Rai Benjamin both broke 47 in the same race. The two did battle many times after that. Warholm finally broke Young's record in 2021, just before the record had stood for 29 years. That season culminated with the 2020 Olympics where Warholm took the world record under 46 seconds to 45.94, which still stands as the current world record. In that race, on this track, Benjamin ran the second fastest time in history 46.17 and they were chased there by Alison dos Santos also under 47 seconds. Between the three of them, they had broken 47 seconds 38 times.

Warholm returns as defending champion also having won in 2017 and 2019. dos Santos won in 2022, Benjamin won the 2024 Olympics. Warholm also enters this championships with the world lead, his 46.28 less than a month before this race was the third fastest time in history.

Samba had the fastest time in the heats with a 48.03. Young NCAA Champion Ezekiel Nathaniel led the semis-final round with a 47.47. Only dos Santos was able to sneak into the finals with a time over 48 seconds. Unlike his customary lane 7, Warholm drew lane 4, Benjamin got lane 7, with Samba and Nathaniel in 5 and 6, while slow qualifier dos Santos was relegated to lane 9 where he couldn't see his competition. Qatar got a second athlete into the finals with Ismail Abakar. USA also got Caleb Dean.

In the final, Warholm was out aggressively, as is his style, making the athletes to his outside look like they were falling behind. By the end of the first turn, Warholm had made up the stagger on Samba who in turn had almost caught Nathaniel. Uncharacteristically, Benjamin was out just as aggressively making up the stagger on Abakar. When Warholm dragged his trail leg on the third hurdle, that little bobble put Benjamin virtually even. It was clearly a two man race with dos Santos the next to rise a stride behind by the fourth barrier. Down the backstretch, Warholm ran even with Samba and Nathaniel. Both Warholm and Benjamin hit the 200 split in 21.4. By the seventh hurdle, Benjamin had edged into a slight lead. By hurdle eight as the stagger tightened Benjamin had a full stride over Warholm, with dos Santos and Samba only another stride behind Warholm. Onto the home stretch, Benjamin had a clear lead with dos Santos and Samba gaining on Warholm. A few strides out from the final hurdle, a tiring Benjamin took an extra wide swing of his arm to try to lengthen his stride. The corrective action didn't work, he came up short, his left heel hitting the top left of the hurdle. He rode the hurdle until it tipped out of his way, the hurdle knocking Nathaniel's last hurdle out of place. Benjamin had lost his momentum, he struggled home as dos Santos closed rapidly. With just 40 metres to the finish, dos Santos didn't have enough real estate to catch up before Benjamin got over the line. Samba caught the slowing Warholm just after the tenth hurdle. Nathaniel had to go extra high to get over his out of place hurdle, then closed rapidly to almost catch Samba for the bronze.

After the race, Benjamin was disqualified. By hitting the hurdle with the bottom of his foot, it could be interpreted that Benjamin intentionally did not jump the full height of the final hurdle. Also, a hurdler is responsible for any interference a hurdle moved by his action might cause. After a long wait in the elimination area, Benjamin was reinstated as the gold medalist.

== Records ==
Before the competition records were as follows:

Record	Athlete & Nat.	Perf.	Location	Date
World record	Karsten Warholm (NOR)	45.94	Tokyo, Japan	3 August 2021
Championship record	Alison dos Santos (BRA)	46.29	Eugene, United States	19 July 2022
2025 World Leading	Karsten Warholm (NOR)	46.28	Chorzów, Poland	16 August 2025
African Record	Samuel Matete (ZAM)	47.10	Zürich, Switzerland	7 August 1991
Asian Record	Abderrahman Samba (QAT)	46.98	Paris, France	30 June 2018
European Record	Karsten Warholm (NOR)	45.94	Tokyo, Japan	3 August 2021
North, Central American and Caribbean record	Rai Benjamin (USA)	46.17	Tokyo, Japan	3 August 2021
Oceanian record	Rohan Robinson (AUS)	48.28	Atlanta, United States	31 July 1996
South American Record	Alison dos Santos (BRA)	46.29	Eugene, United States	19 July 2022

== Qualification standard ==
The standard to qualify automatically for entry was 48.50.

== Schedule ==
The event schedule, in local time (UTC+9), was as follows:

Date	Time	Round
15 September	19:35	Heats
17 September	21:30	Semi-finals
19 September	21:15	Final

== Results ==
=== Heats ===
The heats took place on 15 September. The first four athletes in each heat ( Q ) and the next four fastest ( q ) qualified for the semi-finals.

==== Heat 1 ====
Place	Lane	Athlete	Nation	Time	Notes
1	7	Abderrahman Samba	Qatar	48.03	Q
2	6	Tyri Donovan	Great Britain & N.I.	48.26	Q, PB
3	3	Chris Robinson	United States	48.27 [.263]	Q
4	8	Malik James-King	Jamaica	48.27 [.267]	Q, SB
5	2	Wiseman Were Mukhobe	Kenya	48.27 [.269]	q, PB
6	4	Oskar Edlund	Sweden	48.52	q, PB
7	1	Jesús David Delgado	Spain	48.98	q
8	5	Shunta Inoue	Japan	49.73	
9	9	Chi Chong Cheong	Macau	52.76	

==== Heat 2 ====
Place	Lane	Athlete	Nation	Time	Notes
1	9	Bassem Hemeida	Qatar	48.43	Q
2	4	Alison dos Santos	Brazil	48.48	Q
3	6	Owe Fischer-Breiholz	Germany	48.81	Q
4	1	Matic Ian Guček	Slovenia	48.92	Q
5	3	Kyron McMaster	British Virgin Islands	49.89	
6	2	Daiki Ogawa	Japan	50.08	
7	5	Marc Anthony Ibrahim	Lebanon	50.20	
8	8	Akanye Francis	Saint Kitts and Nevis	53.26	
—	7	Alessandro Sibilio	Italy	DNF	

==== Heat 3 ====
Place	Lane	Athlete	Nation	Time	Notes
1	2	Matheus Lima	Brazil	48.15	Q
2	6	Ismail Abakar	Qatar	48.34	Q
3	9	Karsten Warholm	Norway	48.56	Q
4	4	Berke Akçam	Turkey	48.68	Q, SB
5	7	Kemorena Tisang	Botswana	48.72	q
6	8	Joshua Abuaku	Germany	49.41	
7	1	Carl Bengtström	Sweden	49.74	
8	3	Assinie Wilson	Jamaica	49.91	
9	5	Jun Jie Calvin Quek	Singapore	50.17	

==== Heat 4 ====
Place	Lane	Athlete	Nation	Time	Notes
1	9	Rai Benjamin	United States	48.15	Q
2	3	Emil Agyekum	Germany	48.33	Q
3	1	Victor Ntweng	Botswana	48.54	Q, PB
4	8	Gerald Drummond	Costa Rica	48.81	Q, SB
5	7	Roshawn Clarke	Jamaica	48.83	q
6	2	Vít Müller	Czech Republic	49.02	
7	4	Seamus Derbyshire	Great Britain & N.I.	49.20	
8	5	Dennick Luke	Dominica	49.32	
9	6	Julien Bonvin	Switzerland	49.53	

==== Heat 5 ====
Place	Lane	Athlete	Nation	Time	Notes
1	7	Ezekiel Nathaniel	Nigeria	48.37	Q
2	5	Caleb Dean	United States	48.67	Q
3	3	Francisco Guilherme dos Reis Viana	Brazil	48.69	Q, PB
4	4	Alastair Chalmers	Great Britain & N.I.	48.86	Q
5	8	Sabelo Dhlamini	South Africa	49.50	
6	1	İsmail Nezir	Turkey	49.66	
7	9	Patrik Dömötör	Slovakia	49.91	
8	6	Ken Toyoda	Japan	51.80	
9	2	Najimul Hossain Roni	Bangladesh	52.47	

=== Semi-finals ===
The semi-finals took place on 17 September. The first two athletes in each heat ( Q ) and the next two fastest ( q ) qualified for the final.

==== Heat 1 ====
Place	Lane	Athlete	Nation	Time	Notes
1	8	Abderrahman Samba	Qatar	47.63	Q
2	4	Karsten Warholm	Norway	47.72	Q
3	5	Emil Agyekum	Germany	47.83	q, PB
4	7	Tyri Donovan	Great Britain & N.I.	48.21	PB
5	2	Matic Ian Guček	Slovenia	48.51	
6	9	Francisco Guilherme dos Reis Viana	Brazil	49.01	
—	6	Chris Robinson	United States	DNF	
—	3	Kemorena Tisang	Botswana	DQ	TR17.2.3

==== Heat 2 ====
Place	Lane	Athlete	Nation	Time	Notes
1	8	Ezekiel Nathaniel	Nigeria	47.47	Q
2	6	Ismail Abakar	Qatar	47.61	Q, PB
3	5	Caleb Dean	United States	47.85	q
4	4	Malik James-King	Jamaica	48.01	SB
5	7	Matheus Lima	Brazil	48.16	
6	3	Wiseman Were Mukhobe	Kenya	48.65	
7	2	Oskar Edlund	Sweden	48.81	
8	9	Jesús David Delgado	Spain	49.41	

==== Heat 3 ====
Place	Lane	Athlete	Nation	Time	Notes
1	5	Rai Benjamin	United States	47.95	Q
2	6	Alison dos Santos	Brazil	48.16	Q
3	7	Bassem Hemeida	Qatar	48.29	PB
4	2	Roshawn Clarke	Jamaica	48.37	
5	9	Berke Akçam	Turkey	49.10	
6	3	Alastair Chalmers	Great Britain & N.I.	49.49	
7	4	Gerald Drummond	Costa Rica	49.58	
8	8	Victor Ntweng	Botswana	49.61	

=== Final ===
Rai Benjamin was temporarily disqualified minutes after winning the gold medal, before the decision was reversed and he was reinstated as champion.

Place	Lane	Athlete	Nation	Time	Notes
1st place, gold medalist(s)	7	Rai Benjamin	United States	46.52	SB
2nd place, silver medalist(s)	9	Alison dos Santos	Brazil	46.84	
3rd place, bronze medalist(s)	5	Abderrahman Samba	Qatar	47.06	SB
4	6	Ezekiel Nathaniel	Nigeria	47.11	NR
5	4	Karsten Warholm	Norway	47.58	
6	3	Emil Agyekum	Germany	47.98	
7	2	Caleb Dean	United States	48.20	
8	8	Ismail Abakar	Qatar	49.82	
