= Costa Rica at the 2023 World Athletics Championships =

- Flag of Costa Rica
- WA code: CRC

in Budapest, Hungary 19 August 2023 – 27 August 2023
- Competitors: 1 (1 man and 0 women)
- Medals: Gold 0 Silver 0 Bronze 0 Total 0

World Athletics Championships appearances
- 1983; 1987; 1991; 1993; 1995; 1997; 1999; 2001; 2003; 2005; 2007; 2009; 2011; 2013; 2015; 2017; 2019; 2022; 2023; 2025

Costa Rica competed at the 2023 World Athletics Championships in Budapest, Hungary, which were held from 19 to 27 August 2023. The athlete delegation of the country was composed of one competitor, hurdler Gerald Drummond who would compete in the men's 400 metres hurdles. He qualified for the Championships after meeting the entry standard of his event. In the heats, Drummond placed fourth out of the nine competitors that competed in his heat and advanced to the semifinals. In the semifinals, Drummond placed last in his round and failed to advance to the finals.

== Background ==
The 2023 World Athletics Championships in Budapest, Hungary, were held from 19 to 27 August 2023. The Championships were held at the National Athletics Centre. To qualify for the World Championships, athletes had to reach an entry standard (e.g. time or distance), place in a specific position at select competitions, be a wild card entry, or qualify through their World Athletics Ranking at the end of the qualification period.

Hurdler Gerald Drummond would be the sole representative for the nation at the championships. He qualified after meeting the entry standard of 400 metres hurdles of 48.70 seconds, recording a national record time of 48.11 seconds at the 2023 Central American Championships in Athletics held in the Costa Rica National Stadium. This was Drummond's second appearance for Costa Rica at the World Athletics Championships.

== Results ==
Key

- Q = Qualified for the next round
- q = Qualified for the next round as a fastest loser or, in field events, by position without achieving the qualifying target
- NR = National record
- PB = Personal best
- SB = Season best
- N/A = Round not applicable for the event

=== Men ===
Drummond competed in the heats of the men's 400 metres hurdles on 20 August against eight other competitors in his heat. He raced in the fifth heat and recorded a time of 48.73 seconds. There, he placed fourth and advanced to the semifinals. The semi-finals were held the next day and Drummond competed against seven other competitors in the third round. There, he recorded a time of 49.31 seconds and placed last, failing to advance to the finals of the event.

Track and road events

Athlete	Event	Heat		Semifinal		Final	
Athlete	Event	Result	Rank	Result	Rank	Result	Rank
Gerald Drummond	400 metres hurdles	48.73	4 Q	49.31	8	Did not advance	
