= Kenny Selmon =

American hurdler

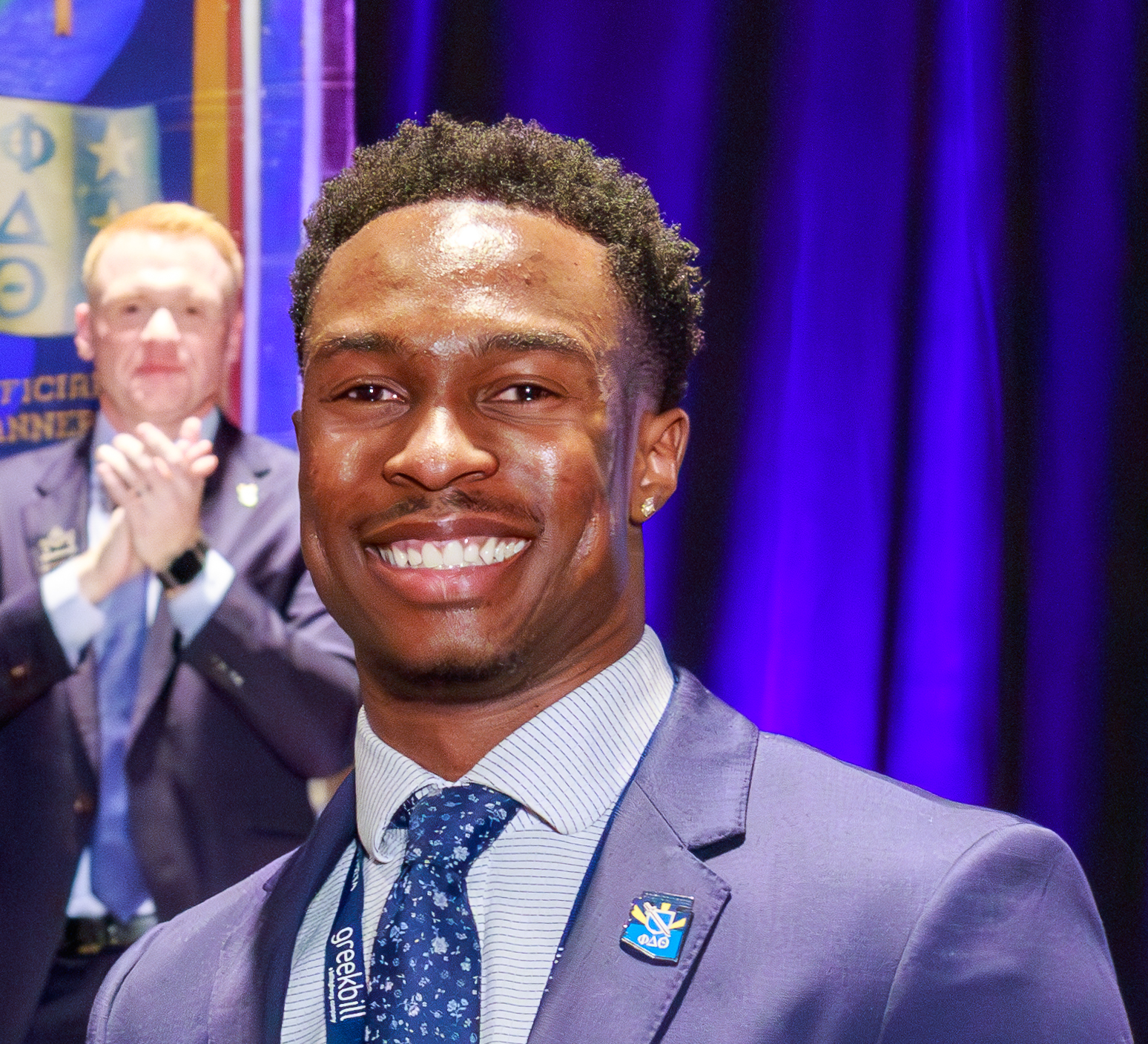

Personal information
- Born: August 27, 1996 (age 29) Mableton, GA
- Height: 6 ft 0 in (183 cm)
- Weight: 180 lb (82 kg)

Sport
- Country: United States
- Sport: Men's athletics
- Event: Hurdles
- College team: North Carolina Tar Heels
Medal record
World Youth Championships
Bronze medal – third place	2013 Donetsk	400 m hurdles
Pan American Junior Championships
Silver medal – second place	2015 Edmonton	400 m hurdles
Athletics World Cup
Gold medal – first place	2018 London	400 m hurdles
- Updated on 26 January 2021

Kenneth Selmon (born August 27, 1996) is an American track and field athlete who specializes in the 400 metres hurdles. He won the USA Outdoor Championship in 2018 and represented his country at the 2018 Athletics World Cup in London, where he won the 400 metres hurdles.

== Early life ==
Selmon attended high school at Pace Academy in Atlanta, GA. He was a 7-time GHSA state champion in track and field and 3-time all-american in the 400 metres hurdles. While in high school, Selmon placed third at the 2013 World Youth Championships in the 400mH and won the 2014 National Championship.

== Collegiate career ==
Selmon attended the University of North Carolina where he competed in indoor and outdoor track and field. While at UNC, Selmon won two ACC Championships in the 400 metres hurdles and placed 4th, 3rd, and 2nd in the NCAA Division I National Championships in the 400mH in 2016, 2017, and 2018. His college personal record of 48.12, which he ran at the NCAA Division I Championships in 2018, is the fastest in UNC history. While in college, Selmon competed in the 2016 Olympic Team Trials where he placed 7th. After graduating from UNC, Selmon won the 2018 USATF Outdoor Championships in the 400 metres hurdles.

== Professional career ==
After graduating college, Selmon represented the United States at the 2018 London Athletics World cup which he won.

Kenny Selmon signed a professional contract with Spyder Korea in 2019.

Selmon qualified for the 2021 U.S. Olympic team in the 400m hurdles.

== International competitions ==
Representing the United States
Year	Competition	Venue	Position	Event	Result	Notes
2013	World Youth Championships	Donetsk, Ukraine	3rd	400 m hurdles	51.30	
2014	World Junior Championships	Eugene, United States	15th (sf)	400 m hurdles	52.18	
2015	Pan American Junior Championships	Edmonton, Canada	2nd	400 m hurdles	50.29	
2018	Athletics World Cup	London, United Kingdom	1st	400 m hurdles	48.97	

== National titles ==
- USA Outdoor Track and Field Championships
  - 400 m hurdles: 2018
- USATF U20 Outdoor Championships
  - 400 m hurdles: 2015
