= 2013 World Youth Championships in Athletics – Boys' 400 metres hurdles =

Boys' 400 metres hurdles at the 2013 World Youth Championships in Athletics
- Venue: RSC Olimpiyskiy
- Dates: 10 July (heats); 11 July (semifinal); 13 July (final)
- Competitors: 51
- Winning time: 50.39 WYL

Medalists
gold medal	Marvin Williams	Jamaica
silver medal	Wang Yang	China
bronze medal	Kenny Selmon	United States

The boys' 400 metres hurdles at the 2013 World Youth Championships in Athletics was held on 10, 11 and 13 July.

== Medalists ==
Gold	Silver	Bronze
Marvin Williams; Jamaica	Wang Yang; China	Kenny Selmon; United States

== Records ==
Prior to the competition, the following records were as follows.

World Youth Best	William Wynne (USA)	49.01	Ostrava, Czech Republic	15 July 2007
Championship Record	William Wynne (USA)	49.01	Ostrava, Czech Republic	15 July 2007
World Youth Leading	Marlon Humphrey (USA)	50.75	Edwardsville, IL, United States	26 June 2013

== Heats ==
Qualification rule: first 3 of each heat (Q) and the next 3 fastest (q) qualified.

=== Heat 1 ===
Rank	Lane	Name	Nationality	Time	Notes
1	2	Marlon Humphrey	United States	52.00	Q
2	3	Xavier Coakley	Bahamas	54.11	Q
3	4	Daniel Brady	Canada	54.65	Q
4	5	Adrian Chirita	Romania	54.96	
5	6	Sumit Kumar Jaisawal	India	55.00	SB
6	7	Farkhod Pattaev	Uzbekistan	56.97	
	8	Enej Vrhunec	Slovenia	DQ	

=== Heat 2 ===
Rank	Lane	Name	Nationality	Time	Notes
1	2	Marvin Williams	Jamaica	51.33	Q PB
2	3	Takumu Furuya	Japan	52.59	Q PB
3	5	Ryan Wallis	Spain	52.70	Q
4	7	Mykola Lobatenko	Ukraine	54.03	PB
5	8	Larry Lombard	South Africa	54.05	
6	6	Mohamed Ammar Zanuar	Malaysia	55.62	
7	1	Juan Arévalo	Colombia	56.07	
8	4	Saad Abdullah Al Bishi	Saudi Arabia	56.95	PB

=== Heat 3 ===
Rank	Lane	Name	Nationality	Time	Notes
1	5	Okeen Williams	Jamaica	52.11	Q SB
2	8	Mohamed Fares Jlassi	Tunisia	53.38	Q
3	2	Naoya Okubo	Japan	53.50	Q PB
4	6	Florian Gouacide	France	55.06	
5	4	D'Mitry Charlton	Bahamas	56.09	
6	3	Rene Rafael Perla	El Salvador	58.80	
7	7	Calvin Quek	Singapore	1:02.84	

=== Heat 4 ===
Rank	Lane	Name	Nationality	Time	Notes
1	4	Wang Yang	China	51.99	Q PB
2	8	Matteo Beria	Italy	53.00	Q PB
3	6	Mahmoud Reza Moshtagh	Iran	54.13	Q PB
4	5	Ali Mohamed Buhmeed	Bahrain	54.80	PB
5	3	László Szeitz	Hungary	54.95	
6	7	Florentin Lesage	France	55.78	
7	2	Dylan Permal	Mauritius	56.23	

=== Heat 5 ===
Rank	Lane	Name	Nationality	Time	Notes
1	2	Derick Diaz	Puerto Rico	52.12	Q PB
2	7	Rai Benjamin	Antigua and Barbuda	52.49	Q PB
3	8	Giuseppe Biondo	Italy	53.26	Q
4	5	Vladislav Omelchenko	Russia	53.50	q
5	6	Divan Rossouw	Namibia	53.51	q PB
6	4	Sofiane Titouah	Algeria	54.03	PB
7	3	Petro Chernyshenko	Ukraine	54.30	PB

=== Heat 6 ===
Rank	Lane	Name	Nationality	Time	Notes
1	6	Kenny Selmon	United States	52.03	Q
2	8	Avotriniaina Rakotoarimiandry	Madagascar	53.36	Q
3	2	Raouf Jedid	Tunisia	53.50	Q PB
4	3	Parmvir Singh	India	53.66	SB
5	4	Salvador García	Mexico	54.61	
6	7	Davis Edward	Canada	54.87	
7	5	Daniel Chidavaenzi	Zimbabwe	55.58	

=== Heat 7 ===
Rank	Lane	Name	Nationality	Time	Notes
1	5	Javier Delgado	Spain	52.20	Q PB
2	2	Geofrey Kipkoech Cheruiyot	Kenya	52.44	Q PB
3	3	Khalid Mohammed Al-Shahrani	Qatar	52.92	Q PB
4	6	Hanno Coetzer	South Africa	53.41	q
5	4	Xavier Martí	Venezuela	54.89	PB
6	7	Raymond Scott Lee Chian Hoong	Singapore	56.13	
7	1	Azamat Dosmuratov	Kazakhstan	56.28	
8	8	Salman Abdulrahman Al Harbi	Saudi Arabia	1:00.12	PB

== Semifinals ==
Qualification rule: first 2 of each heat (Q) plus the 2 fastest times (q) qualified.

=== Heat 1 ===
Rank	Lane	Name	Nationality	Time	Notes
1	5	Wang Yang	China	50.72	Q WYL
2	6	Kenny Selmon	United States	50.95	Q
3	3	Geofrey Kipkoech Cheruiyot	Kenya	51.01	q PB
4	4	Naoya Okubo	Japan	52.03	PB
5	8	Matteo Beria	Italy	52.18	PB
6	7	Xavier Coakley	Bahamas	53.78	
7	2	Vladislav Omelchenko	Russia	54.30	
8	1	Raouf Jedid	Tunisia	55.30	

=== Heat 2 ===
Rank	Lane	Name	Nationality	Time	Notes
1	3	Marvin Williams	Jamaica	51.31	Q PB
2	4	Derick Diaz	Puerto Rico	51.95	Q PB
3	5	Avotriniaina Rakotoarimiandry	Madagascar	52.11	PB
4	7	Giuseppe Biondo	Italy	52.45	
5	6	Javier Delgado	Spain	52.84	
6	1	Mahmoud Reza Moshtagh	Iran	52.88	Q PB
7	8	Mohamed Fares Jlassi	Tunisia	52.96	
8	2	Divan Rossouw	Namibia	55.75	

=== Heat 3 ===
Rank	Lane	Name	Nationality	Time	Notes
1	6	Okeen Williams	Jamaica	50.53	Q WYL
2	5	Marlon Humphrey	United States	50.96	Q
3	4	Takumu Furuya	Japan	51.0	q PB
4	7	Ryan Wallis	Spain	52.21	PB
5	3	Rai Benjamin	Antigua and Barbuda	52.36	PB
6	1	Hanno Coetzer	South Africa	53.60	
7	8	Khalid Mohammed Al-Shahrani	Qatar	54.26	
8	2	Daniel Brady	Canada	54.78	

== Final ==
Rank	Lane	Name	Nationality	Time	Notes
1st place, gold medalist(s)	4	Marvin Williams	Jamaica	50.39	Q WYL
2nd place, silver medalist(s)	6	Wang Yang	China	50.78	
3rd place, bronze medalist(s)	5	Kenny Selmon	United States	51.30	
4	1	Takumu Furuya	Japan	51.58	
5	7	Derick Diaz	Puerto Rico	51.76	PB
	2	Geofrey Kipkoech Cheruiyot	Kenya	DNF	
	3	Okeen Williams	Jamaica	DNF	
	8	Marlon Humphrey	United States	DNS	
