= Rai Benjamin =

American sprinter and hurdler (born 1997)

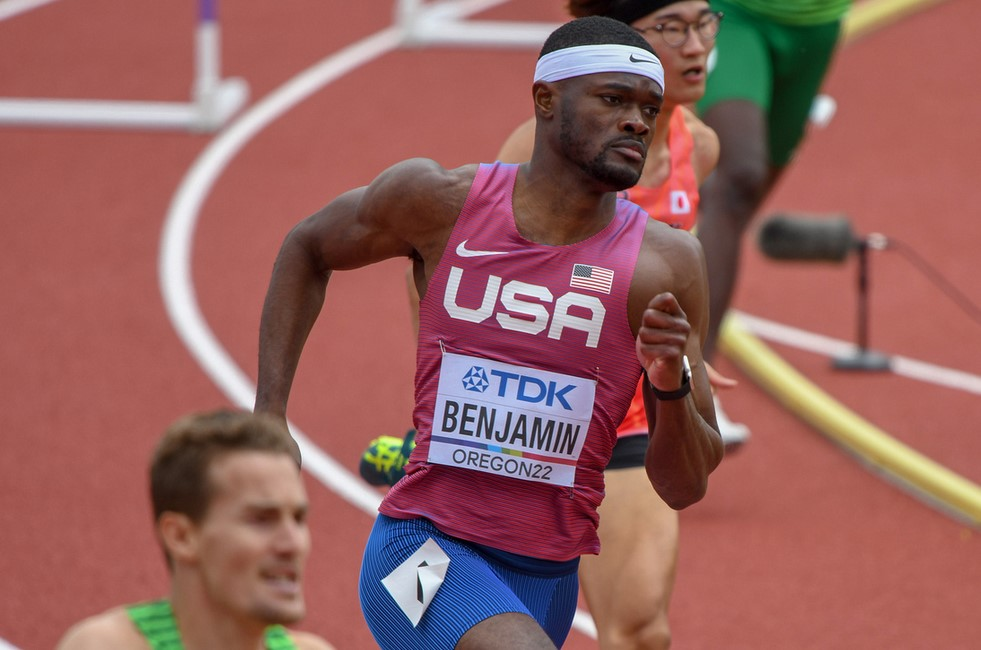
- Benjamin at the 2022 World Athletics Championships in Eugene

Personal information
- Born: July 27, 1997 (age 29) Mount Vernon, New York, U.S.
- Height: 6 ft 3 in (191 cm)
- Weight: 170 lb (77 kg)

Sport
- Country: United States
- Sport: Track and field
- Events: Hurdling, sprinting
- College team: USC Trojans (2017, 2018); UCLA Bruins (2016)
- Team: Nike
- Turned pro: 2018
- Coached by: Joanna Hayes; Quincy Watts; Caryl Smith-Gilbert

Achievements and titles
- Olympic finals: 2020 Tokyo; 400 m hurdles, Silver; 2024 Paris; 400 m hurdles, Gold
- World finals: 2025 Tokyo; 400 m hurdles, Gold; 2019 Doha; 400 m hurdles, Silver; 2022 Eugene; 400 m hurdles, Silver; 2023 Budapest; 400 m hurdles, Bronze
- Personal bests: 400 m hurdles: 46.17 AR (Tokyo 2021); 400 m: 43.83 (Chorzów 2026); 200 m: 19.99 (Paris 2018); 100 m: 10.03 (Fort Worth 2020); Indoors; 400 m: 45.39i (Staten Island 2021); 200 m: 20.34i NR (Note: For Antigua and Barbuda) (College Station 2018)
Medal record
Men's athletics
Representing the United States
Olympic Games
Gold medal – first place	2020 Tokyo	4 × 400 m relay
Gold medal – first place	2024 Paris	400 m hurdles
Gold medal – first place	2024 Paris	4 × 400 m relay
Silver medal – second place	2020 Tokyo	400 m hurdles
World Championships
Gold medal – first place	2019 Doha	4 × 400 m relay
Gold medal – first place	2023 Budapest	4 × 400 m relay
Gold medal – first place	2025 Tokyo	400 m hurdles
Silver medal – second place	2019 Doha	400 m hurdles
Silver medal – second place	2022 Eugene	400 m hurdles
Silver medal – second place	2025 Tokyo	4 × 400 m relay
Bronze medal – third place	2023 Budapest	400 m hurdles
World Ultimate Championship
Second place	2026 Budapest	400 m
Second place	2026 Budapest	400 m hurdles
Diamond League
First place	2023	400 m hurdles
Representing Antigua and Barbuda
CARIFTA Games (U-20)
Silver medal – second place	2015 Basseterre	400 m

Rai Benjamin (born July 27, 1997) is an American hurdler and sprinter specializing in the 400 m and 400 m hurdles. He is the third fastest man in history in the 400 m hurdles with a personal best time of 46.17 s. He won a silver medal at his first Olympic Games in 2021 and won the 400 m hurdles race at the 2024 Summer Olympics. Benjamin also has seven World Championships medals, including three gold.

In college, Benjamin ran for the UCLA Bruins and then the USC Trojans, where in early 2018 he was part of the team that set the world best time in the indoor 4 × 400 m relay with a time of 3:00.77. At the time, his relay split time of 44.35 s was the fastest ever recorded in an indoor race. In June of the same year he also helped set the NCAA record in the same event but outdoors, and ran what was at the time the second fastest 400 m hurdles race of all time in 47.02 s.

== Early life and career ==
Benjamin, from Mount Vernon High School (New York), just after completing his second year participated at the 2013 World Youth Championships held in Donetsk, Ukraine. He wanted to run for the US, since he was born in New York, but in Donetsk he represented Antigua and Barbuda in the 400 m hurdles.

He won the 2015 New York Indoor State meet with a national-leading time of 33.17 in the 300 meters. He was a three-time New York State Public High School Athletic Association champion in the 400 m hurdles. Benjamin won a silver medal in the 400 meters at the 2015 CARIFTA Games. He was the 2015 New Balance 400-meter hurdles national champion. He ran the fastest 2015 prep time in the United States in the 400 m hurdles with a time of 49.97, fastest 400 m indoor time in the country with a 46.59 and the third fastest outdoor time 46.19.

== Professional career ==
Benjamin turned professional in 2018. In 2017, the IAAF suspended all transfers of allegiance, meaning Benjamin could not represent the United States until transfers were reinstated in summer 2018. In October 2018, Benjamin's transfer request was approved, allowing him to represent the United States abroad and compete in USATF Championship events. At the 2018 Meeting Areva in Paris, he ran 19.99 in the 200 meters to take .65 of a second off his previous personal best. He became the 72nd person to break 20 seconds.

=== 2019-2021: World championship medalist, Olympic debut, number 2 all-time ===
At the 2019 Mt. SAC Relays, that year at El Camino College in Torrance, California, Benjamin joined his training partner and previous college teammate, Michael Norman running the 400 meters. Benjamin ran his personal best of 44.31, the 50th best time in history behind Norman's 43.45, which turned out to be the fastest 400 run in the 2019 season and tied him as the 4th fastest of all time.

At the Weltklasse Zürich in August 2019, Benjamin became just the fourth person in history to break 47 seconds for the 400 metres hurdles, with a time of 46.98 seconds, as he finished second in the race behind Karsten Warholm, who set a new European record. Competing at the 2019 World Championships in Doha, Qatar, Benjamin won the silver medal in the 400 m hurdles, in 47.66 seconds, finishing behind Warholm, who was also defending champion. At the championships, Benjamin later won a gold medal as part of the American men's 4 × 400 m relay, running the anchor leg alongside Fred Kerley, Michael Cherry and Wil London.

In 2021, Benjamin ran a personal best 46.83 at the US Olympic Trials, and made his Olympic debut at the delayed 2020 Olympic Games in Tokyo, Japan. He won the silver medal in the 400 m hurdles, running 46.17 seconds, not just a personal best time and American record, but the second quickest time ever, beaten into silver only by Karsten Warholm's world record. Some asked if it was "The Greatest Race Ever", with Alison dos Santos third in 46.72, a time they would have been the world record five weeks earlier. Benjamin's time would have marked a 0.53 second improvement on the previous world record and would have been the largest improvement on the record in 53 years, but for Warholm's run. Such was the improvement in recorded times by the three medalists, only Kevin Young apart from Benjamin and Dos Santos had come within a second of Warholm's time. At the Games, Benjamin later won a gold medal in the men's 4 × 400 m relay with Michael Norman, Michael Cherry and Bryce Deadmon.

=== 2022-2023: Further World Championships medals ===
Benjamin also won a silver medal at his home 2022 World Championships held in Eugene, Oregon, running 46.89 seconds behind Alison Dos Santos with Warholm nursing an injury in seventh. Speaking of his competitive rivalry with Warholm and Dos Santos, Benjamin said, "we’ve run so fast and we’re continuing to take the events to new heights…We have to keep it going, keep running fast, keep competing well, and keep giving people the hope for the excitement to come in the future".

By the summer of 2023, Benjamin had tweaked his racing pattern between hurdles, aiming for a longer stride cadence for tempo, producing more speed leading into the back straight finishing kick. In July, Benjamin won a fourth-straight national title in the 400 m hurdles at the 2023 U.S. Track and Field Championships in Eugene, Oregon., running a season's best 46.62, to take the win ahead of CJ Allen.

In August, he won the bronze medal in the 400 metres hurdles at the 2023 World Championships in Budapest, Hungary, running 47.56 seconds behind world-record holder Karsten Warholm and a surprise silver medalist in Kyron McMaster. At the championships, he won the gold medal as the anchor leg of the 4 × 400 m relay alongside Quincy Hall, Vernon Norwood and Justin Robinson.

Benjamin had his best performance of the season last. He won the 2023 Diamond League final at the 2023 Prefontaine Classic on 16 September in 46.39 seconds ahead of Warholm, McMaster and Dos Santos. It was the fourth fastest time in history and the fastest time of 2023 worldwide, as well as a Prefontaine and Diamond League record.

=== 2024: Unbeaten year, Olympic champion ===
Benjamin went through 2024 unbeaten in the 400 metres hurdles. He ran a world-leading time of 46.46 seconds to win the US Olympic Trials, and ran 46.67 seconds to win against his rivals Karsten Warholm and Alison Dos Santos at the 2024 Diamond League meeting Herculis, in Monaco. He became the 2024 Olympic champion in Paris, France in August, running the 400 m hurdles in 46.46 to equal his own world-leading mark. It was his first individual gold medal having earned a podium spot at the previous four global championships, with Warholm behind him in silver, and Dos Santos in bronze. He became a double Paris Olympic gold medalist in the final event of the Games as a member of the American 4 × 400 m relay team retaining the title in 2:54.43, a new Olympic record, racing alongside Christopher Bailey, Vernon Norwood and Bryce Deadmon.

=== 2025-present: World champion 400 m hurdles ===
After opening 2025 on 2 February with a victory in an indoors 300 m in Boston, Benjamin did not compete again until 12 June in Oslo at the 2025 Bislett Games in 300 m hurdles, and then three days later, a 400 m hurdles in Stockholm at the 2025 BAUHAUS-galan. Those marked his first time racing at those European events, and his latest outdoor debut since the pandemic-abbreviated 2020 season. He won the event in Stockholm ahead of Warholm and Dos Santos, and finished runner-up to Warholm in Oslo, running a personal best for the 300 m hurdles of 33.22 seconds. That month, he also recorded a win in the 2025 Diamond League at the Meeting de Paris.

Competing at the 2025 World Championships in Tokyo, Japan, in September 2025, he won the global gold medal for the second consecutive year in the 400 m hurdles, running a season's best time of 46.52 seconds to win from Alison dos Santos and Abderrahman Samba of Qatar. However, Benjamin was initially disqualified because he clipped his final hurdle causing it to dislodge, and its adjusted position came into the adjoining lane of Ezekiel Nathaniel, who was following behind. However, as it did not appear to affect the Nigerian's run or the order of the finishers, Benjamin, who had already posed for pictures trackside with a golden crown, was reinstated. On the final day of the championships he won a silver medal running in the final of the men's 4 × 400 m relay as the American team finished runner-up to Botswana.

Towards the end of 2025, Benjamin announced his intention the following season to race fewer times over hurdles to focus on flat sprint races. Competing at the 2026 Prefontaine Classic in Eugene on 4 July 2026, Benjamin ran a 400 metres flat personal best of 44.11 seconds to finish as runner-up to world champion Collen Kebinatshipi. He lowered it again on 18 July winning in the Diamond League at the 2026 London Athletics Meet in 44.05 seconds. On 21 August, he returned to the 400 m hurdles at the 2026 Athletissima in Lausanne, winning in 46.67 seconds to break the meeting record set by Edwin Moses in 1981. On 23 August, returning to the flat 400 metres sprint he finished second in a personal best 43.83 seconds in the Diamond League at the 2026 Kamila Skolimowska Memorial in Silesia, Poland., On 12 September he placed second over 400 metres at the inaugural World Ultimate Championship in Budapest, qualifying for the final of the 400 metres hurdles in the same evening. The following day, competing in only his third hurdles race of the season, Benjamin ran 46.40 for his second runner-up finish of the weekend, finishing behind new world-record holder Dos Santos who ran the third fastest time in history to win, with Warholm third.

== Personal life ==
Benjamin is the son of West Indies international and Antiguan cricketer Winston Benjamin. His childhood was split between Antigua and New York, before he permanently settled in New York for high school.

Benjamin co-hosts a podcast called "Beyond the Records" with Noah Lyles and Grant Holloway, which launched in December 2024.

Benjamin is an avid cyclist, frequently cycling around Los Angeles and to and from hurdling practice at UCLA.

== Achievements ==
Information from World Athletics profile unless otherwise noted.

=== Personal bests ===
Surface	Event	Time	Venue	Date	Notes
Outdoor	400 m hurdles	46.17	Tokyo, Japan	August 3, 2021	North American record, 2nd all time
Outdoor	400 m	43.83	Chorzów, Poland	August 23, 2026	
Outdoor	200 m	19.99	Paris, France	June 30, 2018	(−0.6 m/s wind)
Outdoor	100 m	10.03	Fort Worth, United States	July 20, 2020	(+1.6 m/s wind)
Outdoor	4 × 400 m relay	2:55.70	Tokyo, Japan	August 7, 2021	2021 world lead
Indoor	400 m	45.39	New York, United States	February 13, 2021	
Indoor	300 m	32.21	Boston, Massachusetts	February 2, 2025	
Indoor	200 m	20.34	College Station, United States	March 10, 2018	NR
Indoor	4 × 400 m relay	3:00.77	College Station, United States	March 10, 2018	World best (Note: Shared with Zach Shinnick, Ricky Morgan, and Michael Norman for the USC Trojans. Because Rai Benjamin was not cleared to represent the United States with his American teammates until after the race, the time was not recognized by the World Athletics as the official world record.)

=== International competitions ===
Year	Competition	Venue	Position	Event	Time	Notes
Representing Antigua and Barbuda
2013	World Youth Championships	Donetsk, Ukraine	15th	400 m hurdles	52.36	
2015	CARIFTA Games (U20)	Basseterre, Saint Kitts and Nevis	2nd	400 m	46.19	PB
2015	World Relays	Nassau, Bahamas	– (h)	4 × 200 m relay	DNF	
Representing the United States
2019	World Championships	Doha, Qatar	2nd	400 m hurdles	47.66	
2019	World Championships	Doha, Qatar	1st	4 × 400 m relay	2:56.69	WL PB
2021	Olympic Games	Tokyo, Japan	2nd	400 m hurdles	46.17	PB AR, 2nd all time
2021	Olympic Games	Tokyo, Japan	1st	4 × 400 m relay	2:55.70	SB
2022	World Championships	Eugene, United States	2nd	400 m hurdles	46.89	
2023	World Championships	Budapest, Hungary	3rd	400 m hurdles	47.56	
2023	World Championships	Budapest, Hungary	1st	4 × 400 m relay	2:57.31	WL
2024	Olympic Games	Paris, France	1st	400 m hurdles	46.46	
2024	Olympic Games	Paris, France	1st	4 × 400 m relay	2:54.43	OR
2025	World Championships	Tokyo, Japan	1st	400 m hurdles	46.52	
2025	World Championships	Tokyo, Japan	2nd	4 × 400 m relay	2:57.83	
2026	World Ultimate Championship	Budapest, Hungary	2nd	400 m	44.15	
2026	World Ultimate Championship	Budapest, Hungary	2nd	400 m hurdles	46.40	

=== Circuit wins ===
- Diamond League (400 m hurdles)
  - Rome: 2019
  - Stanford: 2019
  - Doha: 2021, 2023
  - Eugene: 2023
  - Monaco: 2024
  - Stockholm: 2025
- World Indoor Tour
  - Boston: 2019, 2025 (300 m)

=== National championships ===
Representing the UCLA Bruins (2016–2017), the USC Trojans (2018), and Nike (2019–)
Year	Competition	Venue	Position	Event	Time	Notes
2016	NCAA Division I Championships	Eugene, Oregon	6th	400 m hurdles	49.82	PB
2017	NCAA Division I Championships	Eugene, Oregon	2nd	400 m hurdles	48.33	PB
2017	NCAA Division I Championships	Eugene, Oregon	22nd	4 × 100 m relay	39.89	
2018	NCAA Division I Indoor Championships	College Station, Texas	3rd	200 m	20.34	PB
2018	NCAA Division I Indoor Championships	College Station, Texas	1st	4 × 400 m relay	3:00.77	WB
2018	NCAA Division I Championships	Eugene, Oregon	1st	400 m hurdles	47.02	WL PB CR
2018	NCAA Division I Championships	Eugene, Oregon	1st	4 × 400 m relay	2:59.00	PB CR
2019	USATF Championships	Des Moines, Iowa	1st	400 m hurdles	47.23	
2021	U.S. Olympic Trials	Eugene, Oregon	1st	400 m hurdles	46.83	WL PB MR, 3rd all time
2022	USATF Championships	Eugene, Oregon	1st	400 m hurdles	47.04	
2023	USATF Championships	Eugene, Oregon	1st	400 m hurdles	46.62	
2024	U.S. Olympic Trials	Eugene, Oregon	1st	400 m hurdles	46.46	WL MR
2025	USATF Championships	Eugene, Oregon	1st	400 m hurdles	46.89	

- NCAA results from Track & Field Results Reporting System.

=== Seasonal bests ===
Year	400 m hurdles	400 m	200 m
2013	53.95	49.55	22.38
2014	51.86	47.17	20.88
2015	49.97	46.19	21.09
2016	49.82	47.57	21.17
2017	48.33	45.72	20.64
2018	47.02	44.74	19.99
2019	46.98	44.31	—
2020	—N/a		
2021	46.17	44.97	20.16
2022	46.89	—	20.01
2023	46.39	44.21	—
2024	46.64	44.42	—
2025	46.54	—	—

=== College career ===
Benjamin is a three-time NCAA Division I track champion. As a college student-athlete, Benjamin earned three Pac-12 conference titles, one Mountain Pacific Sports Federation title, and eight NCAA Division I All-America honors (five outdoor, three indoor).

Benjamin's All-America honors were for these accomplishments:

- 2016 indoor, as part of a seventh-place team finish in the indoors distance medley relay, with a time of 9:34.9.
- 2016 outdoor, for a sixth-place finish in the 400-meter hurdles in 49.82.
- 2017 outdoor, for a second-place finish in the 400-meter hurdles in 48.33, and as part of a team finish of 39.89 in the 4 × 100 m relay.
- 2018 indoor, for a third-place finish in the 200 m, and as part of a team that set a college indoor track record of 3:00.77 in the 4 × 400 m relay.
- 2018 outdoor, as part of a team that won the 4 × 400 m relay in 2:59.00, and for a college record time of 47.02 in the 400 m hurdles. His time equalled Edwin Moses's for the second fastest time in history.

Year	Mountain Pacific Sports Federation Indoor track and field	NCAA Indoor	Pac-12 Conference Outdoor	NCAA Division I Outdoor track and field
Representing the University of Southern California
2018		200 m 3rd 20.34	400 m hurdles 1st 48.46	400 m hurdles 1st 47.02 CR
2018	400 m 1st 45.94	4 × 400 m relay 1st 3:00.77 CR	4 × 100 m relay 1st 39.38	4 × 400 m relay 1st 2:59.00
2017	4 × 400 m relay 5th 3:12.50		4 × 400 m relay 4th 3:09.39	4 × 100 m relay 22nd 39.89
2017	400 6th 47.06		400 m hurdles 1st 49.52	400 m hurdles 2nd 48.33
2017	200 m 3rd 21.09			
Representing the University of California, Los Angeles
2016	400 m 7th 47.57		400 m hurdles 52.21	400 m hurdles 6th 49.82
2016		DMR 7th 9:34.39	4 × 100 m relay 4th 40.22	
