= Costa Rica at the 2011 World Championships in Athletics =

- WA code: CRC
- National federation: Federación Costarricense de Atletismo
- Website: www.fecoa.org

in Daegu
- Competitors: 2
- Medals: Gold 0 Silver 0 Bronze 0 Total 0

World Championships in Athletics appearances
- 1983; 1987; 1991; 1993; 1995; 1997; 1999; 2001; 2003; 2005; 2007; 2009; 2011; 2013; 2015; 2017; 2019; 2022; 2023

Costa Rica competed at the 2011 World Championships in Athletics from August 27 to September 4 in Daegu, South Korea. A team of 2 athletes was announced to represent the country in the event.

== Results ==
=== Men ===
Athlete	Event	Preliminaries		Heats		Semifinals		Final	
Athlete	Event	Time Width Height	Rank	Time Width Height	Rank	Time Width Height	Rank	Time Width Height	Rank
Nery Brenes	400 metres			45.47	17	45.93	17	Did not advance	

=== Women ===
Athlete	Event	Preliminaries		Heats		Semifinals		Final	
Athlete	Event	Time Width Height	Rank	Time Width Height	Rank	Time Width Height	Rank	Time Width Height	Rank
Sharolyn Scott	400 m hurdles			58.78	33	Did not advance			
