= Costa Rica at the 2009 World Championships in Athletics =

- WA code: CRC

in Berlin
- Competitors: 3 (2 men, 1 woman)
- Medals: Gold 0 Silver 0 Bronze 0 Total 0

World Championships in Athletics appearances
- 1983; 1987; 1991; 1993; 1995; 1997; 1999; 2001; 2003; 2005; 2007; 2009; 2011; 2013; 2015; 2017; 2019; 2022; 2023

Costa Rica competes at the 2009 World Championships in Athletics from 15 to 23 August in Berlin.

== Team selection ==
Event	Athletes	
Event	Men	Women
200 metres	Nery Brenes	
400 metres	Nery Brenes	Sharolyn Scott
20 km race walk	Allan Segura	

== Results ==
=== Men ===
Event	Athletes	Heats		Quarterfinal		Semifinal		Final	
Event	Athletes	Result	Rank	Result	Rank	Result	Rank	Result	Rank
200 m	Nery Brenes								
400 m	Nery Brenes	DNS	-	-		did not advance			
20 km walk	Allan Segura	-						1:29:52	41

=== Women ===
Event	Athletes	Heats		Semifinal		Final	
Event	Athletes	Result	Rank	Result	Rank	Result	Rank
400 m	Sharolyn Scott	55.63 PB	33	did not advance			
