= Lebanon at the 2022 World Athletics Championships =

- Flag of Lebanon
- WA code: LBN
- National federation: Lebanese Athletics Federation
- Website: www.flalbn.org

in Eugene, United States 15–24 July 2022
- Competitors: 1 (1 man) in 1 event
- Medals: Gold 0 Silver 0 Bronze 0 Total 0

World Athletics Championships appearances
- 1983; 1987; 1991; 1993; 1995; 1997; 1999; 2001; 2003; 2005; 2007; 2009; 2011; 2013; 2015; 2017; 2019; 2022; 2023

Lebanon competed at the 2022 World Athletics Championships in Eugene, Oregon from 15 to 24 July 2022. Lebanon had entered 1 athlete.

== Results ==
Key

- Q = Qualified for the next round
- q = Not qualified for the next round as a fastest loser or, in field events, by position without achieving the qualifying target
- NR = National record
- PB = Personal best
- SB = Season best
- N/A = Round not applicable for the event

=== Men ===
Track and road events

Athlete	Event	Preliminary		Heat		Semi-final		Final	
Athlete	Event	Result	Rank	Result	Rank	Result	Rank	Result	Rank
Noureddine Hadid	100 metres	10.68 SB	11 q	10.72	52	Did not advance			
