= Tyri Donovan =

British athlete (born 1998)

Personal information
- Nationality: British
- Born: 20 October 1998 (age 27)

Sport
- Sport: Athletics
- Event: 400m hurdles
- Club: Windsor, Slough, Eton & Hounslow AC

Achievements and titles
- Personal best(s): 400mH : 48.21 (Tokyo, 2025)

Tyri Donovan (born 20 October 1998) is a British hurdler. He won the national 400 metres hurdles title at the 2025 UK Athletics Championships.

== Career ==
He is a member of Windsor, Slough, Eton and Hounslow Athletic Club in Berkshire. He has a long-standing partnership with coach Marina Armstrong, since he was 16 years-old. He suffered back injuries between 2019 and 2023.

He represented England at the 2024 Loughborough International, winning the 400 metres hurdles in a time of 49.97 seconds. In June 2024, he set a new personal best of 49.23 seconds, which was also the fastest time ever in the British Athletics League, breaking the previous best of 49.40 set by Chris Rawlinson in 1999. He won the England Athletics Senior Championships over 400 metres hurdles in July 2024, in a time of 50.29 seconds.

In June 2025, he ran sub-49 seconds for the 400 metres hurdles for the first time, running 48.84 seconds in Geneva. The following month, he ran a new personal best of 48.46 seconds whilst competing in Derby in the British Athletics League. He equalled his personal best 48.46 seconds for the 400 metres hurdles at the 2025 London Athletics Meet on 19 July 2025. On 3 August, he became the British 400 metres hurdles champion after winning the title at the 2025 UK Athletics Championships in Birmingham.

He competed at the 2025 World Athletics Championships in the men's 400 metres hurdles in Tokyo, Japan, in September 2025, running a personal best 48.26 seconds to qualify for the semi-finals, before lowering it to 48.21 seconds in finishing fourth in his semi-final, although not advancing to the final.

== Personal life ==
His father, Dan Donovan, competed as a 400m runner and was a British Championships silver medallist. Tyri attended Blenheim High School in Epsom. He studied English Language and English Literature at Brunel University before studying translation at the University of Surrey with a focus on Mandarin and Japanese. He is a guitarist and songwriter.
